= Dirty Rotten Scoundrels (musical) =

2004 musical

- Original Broadway Production Poster
- Music: David Yazbek
- Lyrics: David Yazbek
- Book: Jeffrey Lane
- Basis: Dirty Rotten Scoundrels by Dale Launer; Stanley Shapiro; Paul Henning
- Premiere: September 22, 2024: Old Globe Theatre, San Diego
- Productions: 2004 San Diego; 2005 Broadway; 2006 North American tour International and regional productions 2013 Australia; 2014 West End; 2015/16 UK Tour; 2024 West End concert

Dirty Rotten Scoundrels is a 2004 musical comedy, with music and lyrics by David Yazbek and a book by Jeffrey Lane; it is based on the 1988 film of the same name. The musical premiered on Broadway in 2005 and ran for 626 performances despite mixed reviews. It has since received tours and international productions. The Australian production opened in 2013 to rave reviews and was called the "best musical to hit Sydney this century" by The Sydney Morning Herald. A West End production opened in 2014 to generally warm reviews.

== Productions ==
=== Original Broadway production ===
The musical premiered at the Old Globe Theatre in San Diego, California on September 22, 2004, before moving to Broadway in January 2005 and officially opening in March at the Imperial Theatre. The show closed on Broadway on September 3, 2006 after a total of 626 performances. The director was Jack O'Brien, choreographer was Jerry Mitchell, with scenic design by David Rockwell, costume design by Gregg Barnes, sound design by Acme Sound Partners, and lighting design by Kenneth Posner. The cast included John Lithgow, Norbert Leo Butz, and Sherie Rene Scott, with Joanna Gleason, Gregory Jbara, and Sara Gettelfinger. The production was nominated for ten Tony Awards, including Best Musical, Best Book and Best Score, but it won only 1: Actor in a Musical (Butz).

=== National tours and international productions ===
A North American national Equity tour launched on August 4, 2006 with Norbert Leo Butz reprising his role as Freddy, alongside Tom Hewitt as Lawrence. The tour ended on August 19, 2007. A 25-city non-Equity tour, with Jamie Jackson as Lawrence and Doug Thompson as Freddy, began on September 25, 2007 in Dayton, Ohio, with its final performance on March 23, 2008, in Memphis, Tennessee.

International productions have been staged in Tokyo, Mexico City, Stuttgart, Seoul, Oslo, Stockholm, Tampere and Plzeň. Dirty Rotten Scoundrels opened in Sydney, Australia, October 24, 2013 featuring Tony Sheldon, John Wood, Matt Hetherington, Amy Lehpamer, Anne Wood and Katrina Retallick.

=== West End ===
The original UK production had pre-West End tryouts at the Manchester Opera House and the Aylesbury Waterside Theatre beginning in November 2013 before beginning previews at the Savoy Theatre, London, on March 10, 2014, with the official opening night on April 2, 2014. The production was directed and choreographed by Jerry Mitchell, with design by Peter McKintosh, in what was described as a "reconceived and re-imagined" production. The original cast included Robert Lindsay as Lawrence, Rufus Hound as Freddy, Katherine Kingsley as Christine and Samantha Bond as Muriel. The production closed on March 7, 2015.

=== UK Tour ===
The UK tour starred Michael Praed as Lawrence, Noel Sullivan as Freddy, Carley Stenson as Christine, and Geraldine Fitzgerald as Muriel. Mark Benton began the tour in May 2015 as Andre, with Gary Wilmot taking over the role in September 2015. The tour opened in Birmingham at the New Alexandra Theatre on May 5, 2015. The cast also featured Emma Caffrey, Andy Conaghan, Phoebe Coupe, Soophia Faroughi, Jonny Godbold, Orla Gormley, Patrick Harper, Justin Lee-Jones, Jordan Livesey, Lisa Mathieson, Andy Rees, Freya Rowley, Regan Shepherd, Kevin Stephen-Jones, Katie Warsop and Jenny Wickham.

=== West End Concert (2024) ===
On 4 June 2024, it was announced that the show would return to the West End for a concert run at the London Palladium on 24 November 2024, marking 20 years since the show premiered. It starred Ramin Karimloo as Freddy Benson, Hadley Fraser as Laurence Jamieson, Carly Mercedes Dyer as Christine Colgate, Janie Dee as Muriel Eubanks, Cameron Blakely as Inspector Andre, and Alex Young as Jolene Oaks with direction by Rupert Hands and musical direction by Adam Hoskins.

=== Stratford Festival (2025) ===
On 28 August 2024, it was announced that the musical would be performed at the Avon Theatre as part of the Stratford Festival's 2025 season. The director would be Bobby Garcia; the choreographer would be Stephanie Graham; and the music director would be Franklin Brasz. Garcia died unexpectedly on December 17, 2024, and the production, which was directed by Tracey Flye, was dedicated to Garcia's memory.

== Plot ==
=== Act 1 ===
Inside a lively casino near the French Riviera ("Overture"), con-artist Lawrence Jameson is tricking wealthy women out of their money with the help of his "bodyguard" Andre ("Give Them What They Want"). Muriel Eubanks and a few other women express their devotion and amorous feelings for Lawrence, who has conned them ("What Was a Woman To Do"). Andre warns Lawrence about a highly successful con-artist known as "The Jackal", who is said to be visiting the area. Later, aboard a train, Lawrence watches an American named Freddy Benson (who he figures is The Jackal) swindle a woman, but notes that Freddy makes much less money than Lawrence does. Lawrence brings Freddy to his lavish mansion, where Freddy envies Lawrence's success as a swindler and describes everything he'll have when he's rich ("Great Big Stuff"). Freddy asks Lawrence to show him his ways. Andre thinks Freddy is unworthy of Lawrence's attention and compares Freddy to a chimp in a suit ("Chimp in a Suit"). Lawrence is reluctant Freddy's request until Jolene Oakes, a woman he's conned, informs him at gunpoint that he's going to marry her and move with her to Oklahoma ("Oklahoma?"). Lawrence decides to use Freddy's help: Freddy poses as Lawrence's repulsive brother Ruprecht. Seeing that Lawrence plans to make Ruprecht a large part of their life together, Jolene calls off the wedding and leaves him behind. ("All About Ruprecht")

After the pair argue over who did the most work, Lawrence begins to think that there isn't enough room in town for both him and Freddy. They make a bet: the first to swindle a woman out of $50,000 gets to stay in town, while the other has to leave. Immediately after they agree on this, the arrival of "The American Soap Queen" is announced. Her name is Christine Colgate, and she is optimistic, naive and hopelessly clumsy, constantly bumping into people ("Here I Am"). Both con men decide to target her. Freddy presents himself as a war veteran paralyzed from the waist down to win Christine's sympathy and get close to her. Christine and Freddy discuss his medical options and he explains that only one therapist, Dr. Shuffhausen, can help him, but he can't afford Dr. Shuffhausen's $50,000 fee. Christine tells him to keep his hopes up ("Nothing Is Too Wonderful To Be True") and offers to pay for the therapy just as Freddy had hoped ("The Miracle"). She reveals that Dr. Shuffhausen is at the hotel, and Freddy is shocked to discover that Lawrence is posing as Shuffhausen.

=== Act 2 ===
After a short introduction ("Entr'acte"), Lawrence as Shuffhausen performs several torturous tests on Freddy's legs ("Ruffhousin' Mit Shuffhausen"), who has to endure them without complaint. In the side show Muriel meets Andre and the two fall in love ("Like Zis/Like Zat"). Taking Christine to a dance, Lawrence makes every effort to get close to her while Freddy helplessly watches ("The More We Dance"). When he realizes that Christine is not as rich as the men thought after she tells him she sold her possessions to afford the fee, Lawrence tells Freddy that they should call off their $50,000 bet. Freddy reluctantly agrees and they agree on new terms: whoever beds Christine gets to stay. Freddy convinces two sailors to kidnap Lawrence so that he can have Christine to himself.

Freddy meets with Christine at the hotel where he tells her his condition isn't physical, but he needs emotional motivation to get out of his chair. She says she'll be his motivation ("Love Is My Legs"). She sits on the bed until he is finally able to stand up out of his chair and walk to her on the bed (where he "accidentally" falls on top of her in exhaustion). Lawrence then shows up and it turns out to be a test planned by him and Christine. Afterwards, Lawrence has the same two sailors kidnap Freddy while he takes Christine to the train station so she can leave, though feels conflicted after seeing how virtuous she was ("Love Sneaks In"). Freddy shows up, having escaped the sailors too late to get to Christine.

The next day Freddy meets Christine back at the hotel, who says she couldn't leave without seeing him again. When the two agree to have sex, Freddy is excited over it and winning the bet, but realizes he has real feelings for Christine ("Son of Great Big Stuff"). The two get in bed together before the scene is switched to Lawrence's mansion where Christine arrives, telling him tearfully how she came back to see Freddy, how they had sex, and then when she woke up all her money was gone: “I’m beginning to think he was never really paralyzed.” Out of remorse and believing Freddy was responsible, Lawrence packs 50 thousand dollars in a suitcase and tells her to take it. Christine takes it, but returns and gives him back the suitcase saying, "I’ll have something so much better to remember you by" before leaving.

A few minutes later Freddy shows up in his underwear. Lawrence is angry at him for taking Christine's money, but Freddy claims that they never had sex at all; they were about to when she knocked him out, and when he woke up all his belongings were gone. Lawrence then opens up the suitcase to find the money gone, replaced by Freddy's clothes and a note that reads, “Goodbye boys. It was fun! Love, 'The Jackal'”, thus revealing that she knew about their scam the entire time, and instead ended up scamming them ("The Reckoning"). The two men reflect on the events at Lawrence's chateau, agreeing that despite what happened, the entire thing was a ton of fun ("Dirty Rotten Number"). A while later Christine shows up, posing as a real-estate agent and bringing a group of tourists with her. After distracting the tourists, she reunites with Lawrence and Freddy, telling them that although she's made millions from scams in the past year, taking their money was the most fun. The men join Christine's scheme to scam the crowd of people together in the "Finale".

== Musical numbers ==
The musical numbers in the original Broadway production were:

Act I

- "Overture"
- "Give Them What They Want" – Lawrence, Andre, Ensemble
- "What Was a Woman to Do" – Muriel, Women
- "Great Big Stuff" – Freddy, Ensemble
- "Chimp in a Suit" – Andre
- "Oklahoma?" – Jolene, Lawrence, Ensemble
- "All About Ruprecht" – Lawrence, Freddy, Jolene
- "What Was a Woman to Do (Reprise)" – Muriel
- "Here I Am" – Christine, Ensemble
- "Nothing is Too Wonderful to Be True" – Christine, Freddy
- "The Miracle (Act I Finale)" – Company

Act II

- "Entr'acte"
- "Ruffhousin' Mit Shüffhausen" – Lawrence, Freddy, Christine
- "Like Zis/Like Zat" – Andre, Muriel
- "The More We Dance" – Lawrence, Christine, Ensemble
- "Love is My Legs" – Freddy, Christine, Ensemble
- "Love Sneaks In" – Lawrence
- "Like Zis/Like Zat (Reprise)" – Muriel
- "Son of Great Big Stuff" – Freddy, Christine
- "The Reckoning" – Lawrence, Freddy, Andre (with spoken line by Christine)
- "Dirty Rotten Number" – Lawrence, Freddy
- "Finale" – Company

=== Revisions ===
- For the first US tour, the number "Give Them What They Want" was replaced with (according to Yazbek) a more suitable opening number, "The Only Game in Town".
- The West End production restored "Give Them What They Want", although it set the song in Lawrence's dressing room and changed several lines. "Chimp in a Suit" was cut along with Freddie's verse of "Nothing is Too Wonderful to be True". The book and lyrics were also tweaked to Anglicise both some of the characters and references.

== Recording ==
The Dirty Rotten Scoundrels: Original Broadway Cast Recording CD was recorded on March 14, 2005 at Right Track Studio in New York City and was released on May 10, 2005 by Ghostlight Records (an imprint of Sh-K-Boom Records). It was nominated for a Grammy Award for Best Musical Show Album.

== Characters and cast ==
Character	Broadway	US tour	West End	UK and Ireland tour	West End Concert
Character	2005	2006	2014	2016	2024
Lawrence Jameson	John Lithgow	Tom Hewitt	Robert Lindsay	Michael Praed	Hadley Fraser
Freddy Benson	Norbert Leo Butz	Norbert Leo Butz	Rufus Hound	Noel Sullivan	Ramin Karimloo
Christine Colgate	Sherie Rene Scott	Laura Marie Duncan	Katherine Kingsley	Carley Stenson	Carly Mercedes Dyer
Muriel Eubanks	Joanna Gleason	Hollis Resnik	Samantha Bond	Geraldine Fitzgerald	Janie Dee
Inspector Andre Thibault	Gregory Jbara	Drew McVety	John Marquez	Mark Benton	Cameron Blakely
Jolene Oakes	Sara Gettelfinger	Jenifer Foote	Lizzy Connolly	Phoebe Coupe	Alex Young

Notable Broadway replacements

- Jonathan Pryce replaced John Lithgow as Lawrence Jameson on January 17, 2006.
- Rachel York filled in as Christine Colgate from February 7, 2006, to June 20, 2006.
- Rachel deBenedet filled in as Muriel Eubanks from May 2, 2006, to May 21, 2006.
- Lucie Arnaz replaced Joanna Gleason as Muriel Eubanks on May 23, 2006.
- Keith Carradine replaced Jonathan Pryce as Lawrence Jameson on July 21, 2006.
- Brian d'Arcy James replaced Norbert Leo Butz as Freddy Benson on July 21, 2006.
- Richard Kind replaced Gregory Jbara as Andre on August 4, 2006.

Notable West End replacements

- Bonnie Langford replaced Samantha Bond as Muriel Eubanks on September 16, 2014.
- Gary Wilmot replaced John Marquez as Andre on September 16, 2014.
- Alex Gaumond replaced Rufus Hound as Freddy Benson on November 11, 2014.

== Critical reception ==
The Broadway reviews were mixed. Ben Brantley of The New York Times compared the musical with the 2001 hit musical The Producers, also an adaptation of a film about two con men, and found it lacking in confidence and energy. He praised Butz but felt that the musical's "ingredients appear to have been assembled according to an oft-checked shopping list for a borrowed recipe. There is equally little evidence of ... chemistry between its two perpetrators." John Simon at the New York Magazine review mostly liked the book and lyrics, as well as the direction and cast, but found the music merely serviceable. He termed the show "a bit vulgar, a bit hokey, a bit for the tired businessman, but often funny, not infrequently clever, with a nice sprinkling of the outrageous".

The West End reviews were generally favorable. The Sunday Times critic called it "a scandalous delight". The Times found it merely "likeable", giving it three stars out of five and reserving most of its praise for Kingsley. The Telegraph gave it four stars, finding it more fun than the film and praising the book, cast and direction. The Independent also judged it worth three stars but liked the score, which it found witty, more than the book, which it thought was lacking in depth, comparing it unfavorably with The Producers. Michael Billington at The Guardian awarded four stars. He enjoyed the show's nostalgic fun and "escapist fantasy". The London Evening Standard also awarded four stars, also highlighting Kingsley's contribution and concluding: "There’s plenty of razzle-dazzle yet also a wry knowingness." The Financial Times was more critical, giving the show only two stars and lamenting that the songs failed to carry the story and characters forward. It found the show silly, but not "in a good way ... [It] determinedly eradicated every atom other than the feel good. Any instance of underplaying may conceivably result in docked wages. Basic theatrical continuity goes out the window, as characters sing in verbal idioms and even in accents entirely alien to their spoken lines".

== Awards and nominations ==
=== Original Broadway production ===
Year	Award	Category	Nominee	Result
2005	Tony Award	Best Musical		Nominated
2005	Tony Award	Best Book of a Musical	Jeffrey Lane	Nominated
2005	Tony Award	Best Original Score	David Yazbek	Nominated
2005	Tony Award	Best Actor in a Musical	Norbert Leo Butz	Won
2005	Tony Award	Best Actor in a Musical	John Lithgow	Nominated
2005	Tony Award	Best Actress in a Musical	Sherie Rene Scott	Nominated
2005	Tony Award	Best Featured Actress in a Musical	Joanna Gleason	Nominated
2005	Tony Award	Best Direction of a Musical	Jack O'Brien	Nominated
2005	Tony Award	Best Choreography	Jerry Mitchell	Nominated
2005	Tony Award	Best Orchestrations	Harold Wheeler	Nominated
2005	Tony Award	Best Lighting Design	Kenneth Posner	Nominated
2005	Drama Desk Award	Outstanding Musical		Nominated
2005	Drama Desk Award	Outstanding Book of a Musical	Jeffrey Lane	Nominated
2005	Drama Desk Award	Outstanding Actor in a Musical	Norbert Leo Butz	Won
2005	Drama Desk Award	Outstanding Actress in a Musical	Sherie Rene Scott	Nominated
2005	Drama Desk Award	Outstanding Featured Actor in a Musical	Gregory Jbara	Nominated
2005	Drama Desk Award	Outstanding Featured Actress in a Musical	Joanna Gleason	Nominated
2005	Drama Desk Award	Outstanding Choreography	Jerry Mitchell	Nominated
2005	Drama Desk Award	Outstanding Orchestrations	Harold Wheeler	Nominated
2005	Drama Desk Award	Outstanding Music	David Yazbek	Nominated
2005	Drama Desk Award	Outstanding Lyrics	David Yazbek	Nominated
2005	Drama League Award	Distinguished Production of a Musical		Won
2005	Drama League Award	Distinguished Performance	Norbert Leo Butz	Won
2005	Drama League Award	Distinguished Performance	Sherie Rene Scott	Nominated
2005	Outer Critics Circle Awards	Outstanding Broadway Musical		Nominated
2005	Outer Critics Circle Awards	Outstanding Actor in a Musical	Norbert Leo Butz	Won
2005	Outer Critics Circle Awards	Outstanding Actress in a Musical	Sherie Rene Scott	Nominated
2005	Outer Critics Circle Awards	Outstanding Featured Actress in a Musical	Joanna Gleason	Nominated
2005	Outer Critics Circle Awards	Outstanding Choreography	Jerry Mitchell	Nominated
2005	Outer Critics Circle Awards	Outstanding Director of a Musical	Jack O'Brien	Nominated

=== Original London production ===
Year	Award	Category	Nominee	Result	Ref
2015	Laurence Olivier Award	Best Actress in a Supporting Role in a Musical	Samantha Bond	Nominated	
2015	Laurence Olivier Award	Best Choreographer	Jerry Mitchell	Nominated	
