= Bedtime Story (1964 film) =

Film by Ralph Levy

- Theatrical release poster
- Directed by: Ralph Levy
- Written by: Stanley Shapiro; Paul Henning
- Produced by: Stanley Shapiro
- Starring: Marlon Brando; David Niven; Shirley Jones
- Cinematography: Clifford Stine
- Edited by: Milton Carruth
- Music by: Hans J. Salter
- Production companies: The Lankershim Company; Pennebaker, Inc.
- Distributed by: Universal Pictures
- Release date: June 10, 1964
- Running time: 99 minutes
- Country: United States
- Language: English

Bedtime Story is a 1964 American comedy film starring Marlon Brando, David Niven, and Shirley Jones. It was made by Brando's company, Pennebaker Productions, directed by Ralph Levy, produced by Stanley Shapiro, with Robert Arthur as executive producer, from a screenplay by Shapiro and Paul Henning. The music score was by Hans J. Salter and the cinematography by Clifford Stine.

The film has been the basis for two remakes. Dirty Rotten Scoundrels (1988) stars Steve Martin and Michael Caine, and in turn was the basis of the 2004 Broadway musical Dirty Rotten Scoundrels. A second remake, The Hustle (2019), stars Anne Hathaway and Rebel Wilson, changing the Casanova roles from men to women.

== Plot ==
Lawrence Jameson is a refined, elegant con artist living in the French Riviera town of Beaumont-sur-Mer, where he masquerades as the deposed prince of a small European country, seducing wealthy women into donating money and jewelry to his revolutionary "cause". Meanwhile, Corporal Freddy Benson is a small-time operator in the US Army stationed in West Germany, conning his way into the hearts and finances of young women with sob stories about his sick grandmother. His attempt at seducing the daughter of a local Bürgermeister (a mayor) backfires when her father arrives home early, but Freddy is able to blackmail his colonel into giving him an early discharge.

On a train to Beaumont-sur-Mer, Freddy cockily displays his skill as a conman to Lawrence, whom he believes to be a henpecked husband. Lawrence, believing Freddy's "poaching" will endanger his own activities, attempts to distract him into leaving town, and when that fails, arranges for his arrest. Lawrence has him released and buys him a plane ticket to the United States. However, one of Lawrence's former conquests is on the plane and inadvertently gives away Lawrence's deception. Freddy returns and blackmails Lawrence into taking him on as an apprentice.

Freddy is taught to play The Prince's mentally challenged brother Ruprecht, a tactic to scare women away from trying to marry the prince. They are successful, but when Lawrence refuses to pay Freddy until he can acquire the culture necessary for Lawrence's style of con, Freddy decides to set out on his own. Lawrence believes that there is not enough room in Beaumont-sur-Mer for both of them, so the two make a bet: the first one to steal $25,000 from a selected mark will stay, and the other must leave forever.

They choose Janet Walker, a naïve American heiress, announced as the American Soap Queen, as their target. Freddy poses as a soldier who is suffering from psychosomatic paralysis. He wins Janet's affections with a sad story and convinces her that he needs $25,000 to pay for treatment by a celebrated Swiss psychiatrist, Dr. Emil Schaffhausen. Lawrence then masquerades as Dr. Schaffhausen, agreeing to treat Freddy's "condition" with the stipulation that Janet pay the $25,000 directly to him. The two battle for Janet's affections, ruthlessly sabotaging each other, with the worldly Lawrence mostly coming out on top.

Lawrence discovers that Janet is not a major heiress after all, but merely the winner of the American Soap Queen contest, and that she intends to sell all her belongings to pay for Freddy's treatment. Since Lawrence only preys on wealthy women who can afford it, he attempts to call off the bet. Freddy refuses, but suggests they change the bet: the first to get Janet into bed will win. Lawrence refuses to try to seduce Janet, but bets that Freddy will fail to do so.

Freddy has Lawrence kidnapped by some paratroopers whom he fools into believing Lawrence is trying to steal his girl (Janet). He then convinces Janet of his love by "conquering" his paralysis and walking. Lawrence has been present the whole time, and he now declares that Freddy is cured. Lawrence explains that he told the soldiers he had been a British Army paratrooper during the war, and filled them in on Freddy's lies. The angry soldiers keep Freddy occupied until Lawrence puts Janet on a train. However, as the train is departing, Janet receives a telegram stating that Dr. Emil Schaffausen has been dead since 1927. Confused and distraught, she returns to her hotel room, where she finds Freddy, who apparently succeeds in seducing her.

Lawrence gracefully accepts defeat, but Freddy surprisingly has had a change of heart: he could not take advantage of Janet, and realises that his feelings for her are genuine. Instead, he marries her, goes straight, and they return to the US. Lawrence reflects that, in the end, Freddy is happier than he, but as he sees his next mark, a ravishing and extremely wealthy blonde, concludes that "a man must learn to live with his misery".

== Cast ==
- Marlon Brando as Freddy Benson
- David Niven as Lawrence Jameson
- Shirley Jones as Janet Walker
- Dody Goodman as Fanny Eubank
- Aram Stephan as Andre
- Parley Baer as Colonel Williams
- Marie Windsor as Mrs. Sutton
- Rebecca Sand as Miss Trumble
- Frances Robinson as Miss Harrington
- Henry Slate as Sattler
- Norman Alden as Dubin
- Susanne Cramer as Anna
- Cynthia Lynn as Frieda
- Ilse Taurins as Hilda
- Francine York as Gina

== Production ==
Principal photography began on April 16, 1963, with filming taking place on the French Riviera for 12 days before returning to the Universal Studios backlot in Universal City, California, for the remainder of the shooting schedule. A few days later, Marlon Brando was hospitalized due to recurring kidney ailment. He had since resumed work by late May 1963, shooting a scene on location in Malibu, California. Filming wrapped on July 16, 1963, and Brando returned to the hospital the next day.

== Reception ==
In a contemporary review for The New York Times, critic Bosley Crowther wrote: "Bedtime Story is a very funny picture, and Mr. Brando is a first-class farceur. To be sure, the film is lightweight and vapid—just a clever succession of japes and jokes, nothing to cherish in the memory. Neither is the sweet performance of Miss Jones. ... Ralph Levy's direction is temperate, not as wild as you would expect, praise be. And the sets and colors are superior. Mark this one down as good crisp fun."

The film earned $2.1 million in distributor rentals in the United States and Canada.
