= My Cousin Vinny =

1992 film directed by Jonathan Lynn

- Theatrical release poster
- Directed by: Jonathan Lynn
- Written by: Dale Launer
- Produced by: Dale Launer; Paul Schiff
- Starring: Joe Pesci; Ralph Macchio; Marisa Tomei; Mitchell Whitfield; Fred Gwynne
- Cinematography: Peter Deming
- Edited by: Stephen E. Rivkin
- Music by: Randy Edelman
- Production companies: Palo Vista Productions; Peter V. Miller Investment Corp.
- Distributed by: 20th Century Fox
- Release date: March 13, 1992
- Running time: 119 minutes
- Country: United States
- Language: English
- Budget: $11 million
- Box office: $64.1 million

My Cousin Vinny is a 1992 American comedy trial film directed by Jonathan Lynn and written by Dale Launer. It stars Joe Pesci, Ralph Macchio, Marisa Tomei, Mitchell Whitfield and Fred Gwynne in his final film appearance before his death in 1993. The film was distributed by 20th Century Fox and released in the United States on March 13, 1992.

Macchio and Whitfield respectively, play Bill Gambini and Stan Rothenstein, two young New York men who are arrested in Alabama and put on trial for a murder of which they are wrongfully accused. Unable to afford a lawyer, they are defended by Gambini's cousin Vinny Gambini (Pesci), newly admitted to the bar, who arrives with his fiancée, Mona Lisa Vito (Tomei). The clash between the brash Italian-American New Yorkers and the more reserved Southern townspeople provides much of the film's humor. The principal location of filming was Monticello, Georgia.

My Cousin Vinny was a critical and commercial success, with Pesci, Gwynne, Macchio and Tomei praised for their performances. Tomei won the Academy Award for Best Supporting Actress. Attorneys have also lauded the film for its accurate depiction of criminal procedure, the rules of evidence, and trial strategy.

== Plot ==
While driving through Alabama, New York college students Bill Gambini and Stan Rothenstein stop at a convenience store, where Bill absentmindedly pockets a can of tuna. After they leave, the store clerk is found robbed and murdered, and the boys are pulled over and arrested. At the police station, Bill assumes he has been caught shoplifting and confesses, leading to his being charged with murder and Stan as an accessory. Unable to afford a private attorney, Bill calls on his cousin, Vinny Gambini, a personal injury lawyer from Brooklyn, who agrees to take the case. Unbeknownst to them, Vinny has only just passed the bar after numerous failed attempts and has no trial experience. He travels to Alabama with his fiancée, Mona Lisa Vito.

Vinny convinces the trial judge, Chamberlain Haller, that he is an experienced New York attorney practicing under the alias "Jerry Gallo" (later, "Jerry Callo"). Haller, however, repeatedly finds him in contempt for his unusual attire, casual attitude, and lack of courtroom decorum, leading to several brief jail sentences. The prosecuting district attorney, Jim Trotter III, presents a strong but circumstantial case, calling multiple witnesses who implicate Bill and Stan in the murder. Vinny declines to cross-examine these witnesses during the preliminary hearing, alarming the defendants. Stan subsequently fires Vinny and retains the public defender, John Gibbons.

Vinny's inexperience leads him to attempt tricking Trotter into sharing evidence, until Lisa informs him that he can legally obtain it through discovery. She also encourages him to begin interviewing the witnesses, which he proceeds to do. Lisa grows frustrated with Vinny, reminding him of his promise to marry her once he wins his first case, and fearing that day may never come. At the same time, Vinny is eager to prove himself to his mentor, Judge Malloy, who persuaded him to pursue a career in law.

During the trial, Gibbons's nervousness and severe stutter undermine Stan's defense. Meanwhile, Vinny adopts an aggressive but perceptive questioning style that steadily discredits Trotter's witnesses. He uses his newfound knowledge of the cooking time of grits to show that one witness's timeline of the crime is inaccurate. He then challenges the others by questioning their ability to positively identify the suspects due to obstructions in their sightline and impaired vision. Impressed, Stan rehires Vinny to represent him.

The next day, Trotter calls a surprise witness, FBI analyst George Wilbur. Wilbur testifies that tire tracks at the crime scene match those of the boys' 1964 Buick Skylark, though Vinny gets him to admit the tires are among the most common in the United States. Haller then orders a lunch recess and denies Vinny's request for a full-day continuance to prepare a rebuttal. Exhausted from lack of sleep, strained by Haller's hostility, and fearing he will lose the case, Vinny lashes out at Lisa when she tries to help. Soon after, however, he realizes that one of her photographs, showing the tire marks at the scene, may help the case.

Vinny compels a reluctant Lisa to testify as an expert witness, drawing on her family background in auto repair and her encyclopedic knowledge of cars. Examining the photograph, Lisa explains that only the 1963 Pontiac Tempest, which resembles a Buick Skylark, could have made the tire tracks, due to its independent rear suspension and Positraction. Vinny recalls Wilbur to the stand, who confirms Lisa's testimony, simultaneously discrediting his own. The sheriff then testifies that, at Vinny's request, he identified two men fitting Bill's and Stan's description who were arrested in Georgia while driving a stolen Pontiac Tempest, and were carrying a gun matching the murder weapon. With the prosecution's case dismantled, Trotter moves to have all charges dismissed.

Bill, Stan, the sheriff, Trotter, and Judge Haller congratulate Vinny on his success. As he and Lisa drive away, she reveals that she persuaded Judge Malloy to vouch for Vinny's fictitious "Jerry Callo" résumé. The couple then resumes bickering over their long-delayed wedding plans.

== Cast ==
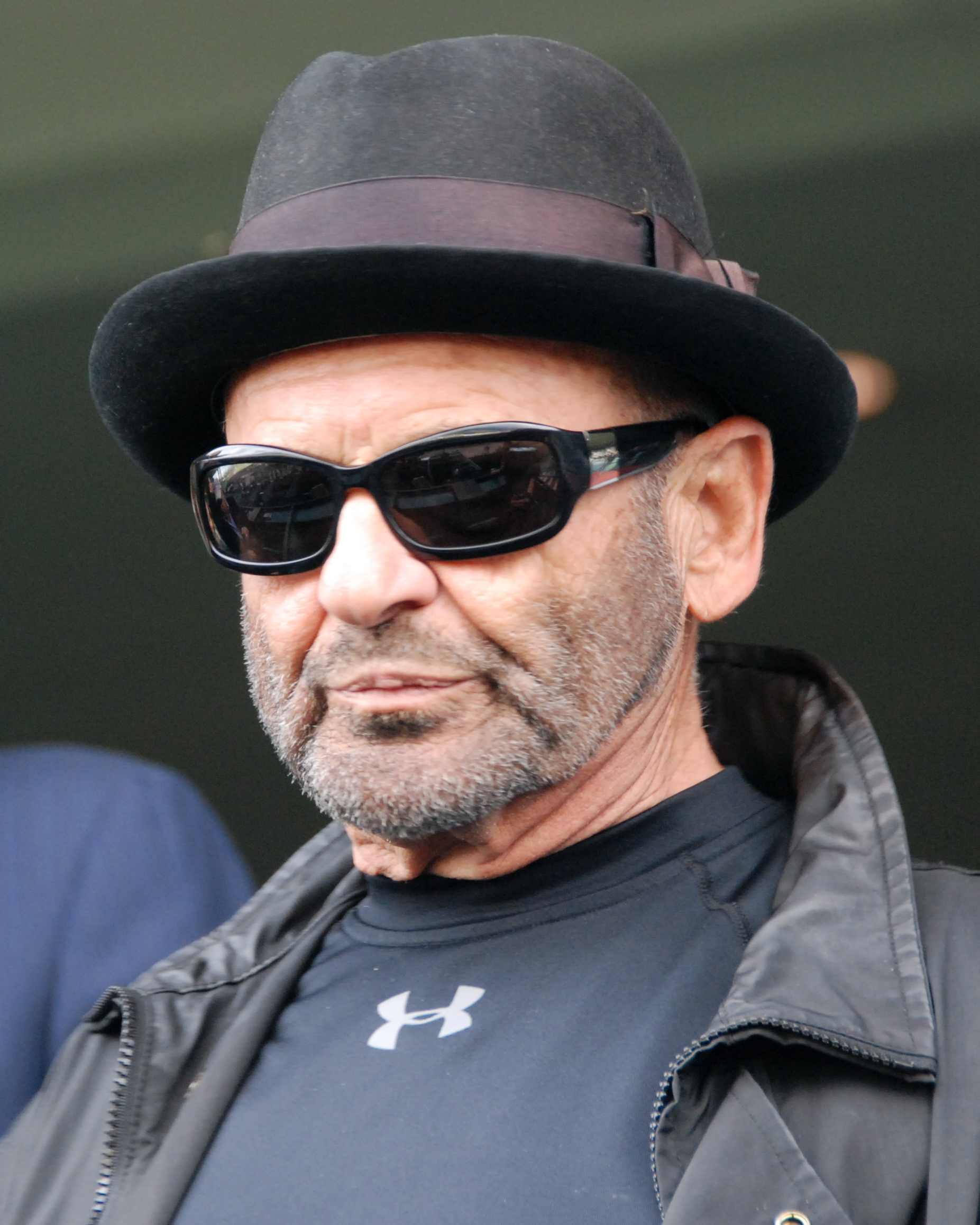
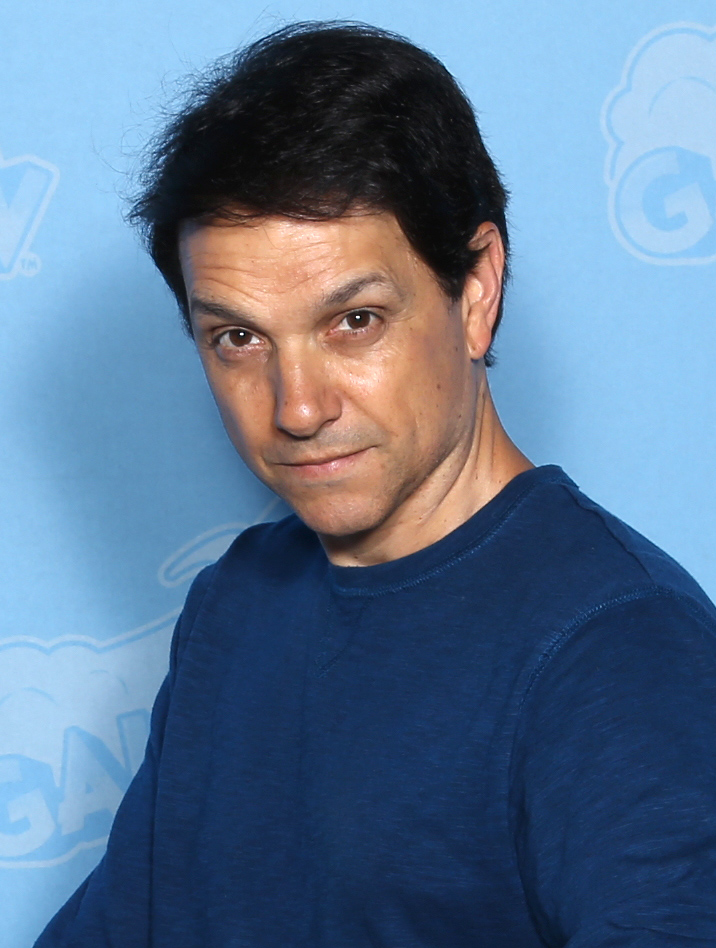
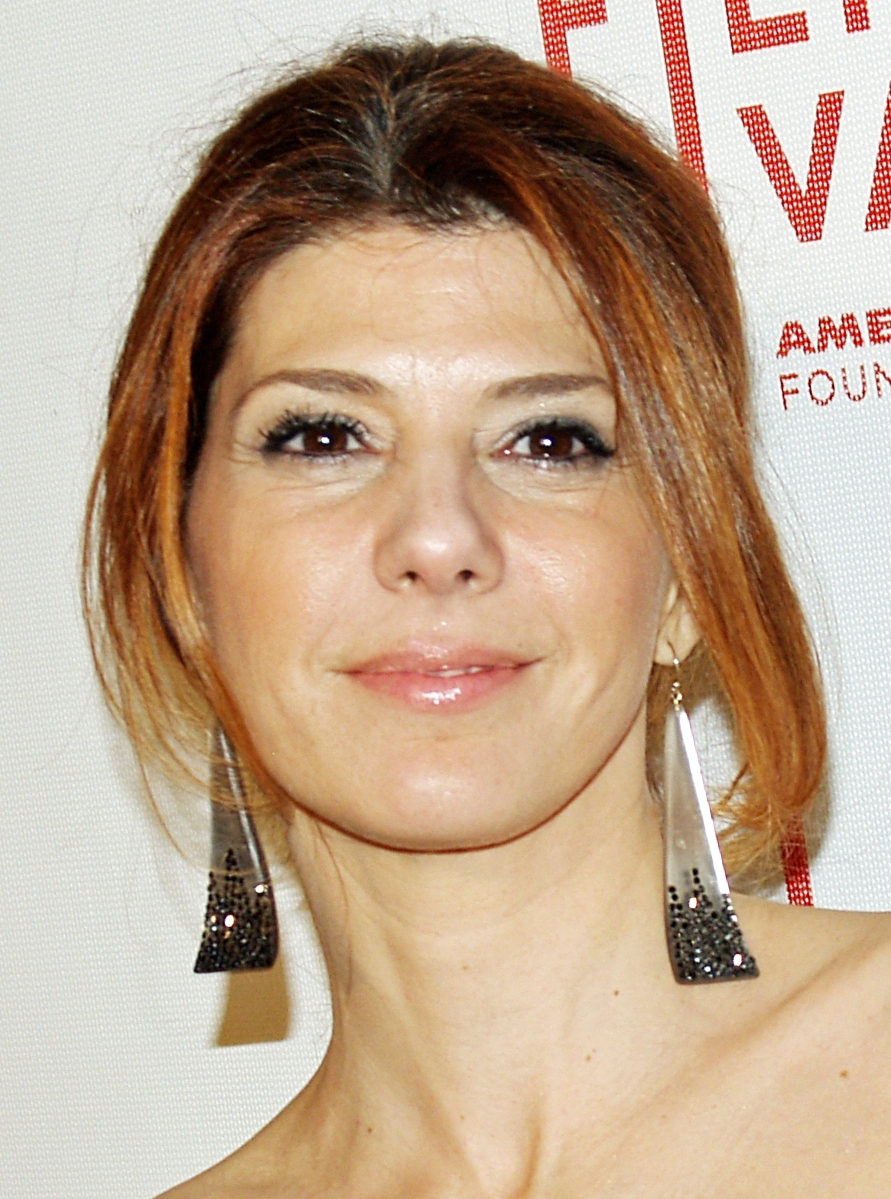
Joe Pesci (pictured in 2009), Ralph Macchio (2019), and Marisa Tomei (2008)
- Joe Pesci as Vinny Gambini, a New York–based injury lawyer working to get his cousin and buddy acquitted of murder
- Ralph Macchio as Bill Gambini, a college student wrongfully accused of murder
- Marisa Tomei as Mona Lisa Vito, Vinny's girlfriend
- Mitchell Whitfield as Stan Rothenstein, a college student wrongfully accused of murder
- Fred Gwynne as Judge Chamberlain Haller, a strict judge presiding over the murder case
- Lane Smith as Jim Trotter III, the prosecutor in the murder case
- Austin Pendleton as John Gibbons, a public defender with a stuttering problem
- Maury Chaykin as Sam Tipton, an eyewitness during the murder
- Bruce McGill as Sheriff Dean Farley, the incumbent sheriff of Beachum County

My Cousin Vinny also features Paulene Myers as Constance Riley and Raynor Scheine as Ernie Crane, who appear as witnesses to the murder, James Rebhorn as George Wilbur, an FBI analyst with knowledge of vehicles, Chris Ellis as J.T., a redneck who stiffed Mona Lisa during a hustle, Michael Simpson as Neckbrace, Lou Walker as Grits Cook, and Kenny Jones as Jimmy Willis, a store clerk who is the murder victim.

== Development ==
Screenwriter Dale Launer came up with the idea for My Cousin Vinny as a college student, after hearing about a lawyer who had finally passed the bar after a 13th attempt. Launer thought it would be funny to have someone traveling through the Southern United States run into legal trouble and end up being represented by that type of lawyer. Launer did not develop the concept until after he had written a few successful screenplays, including Ruthless People and Dirty Rotten Scoundrels. He was inspired by the comedy of Sam Kinison, particularly his approach with hecklers, in developing Vinny, and he based the relationship between Vinny and his fiancée on two dating friends who would argue frequently. Launer also took a road trip through the South where in Butler, Alabama, he got stuck in the mud and had repairs to fix his car, which became part of the script. He met John W. Thompson II, an assistant district attorney, who became the basis of the character of Jim Trotter. He spent several sessions with an attorney to review the process of legal trials, and learned from him that much of criminal court proceedings are not taught in law school but come from practice, which served well for Vinny's character.

For casting, the studio originally wanted Andrew Dice Clay for Vinny, but this did not work out. Other considerations included Danny DeVito, Peter Falk, Robert De Niro, and Jim Belushi, but save for De Niro and DeVito, none of these were the Italian American they were looking for. They eventually cast Joe Pesci, who had just finished Lethal Weapon 2, was finishing filming in Goodfellas, and was an ideal choice for the role. For Mona Lisa, they approached Lorraine Bracco and Carole Davis, but both passed on the role. Director Jonathan Lynn auditioned several other actresses, but found Marisa Tomei when he was invited to the set of the movie Oscar by John Landis, where Tomei had a minor part. While Fox wanted an actress with more fame, they agreed to Tomei. Ben Stiller and Will Smith were considered for the roles of Bill and Stan but, in both cases, there was concern related to the incarceration of a Jewish and Black person in the South, and Ralph Macchio and Mitchell Whitfield were hired instead.

Exterior filming was done near the town of Greensboro, Georgia; the exterior shots of the courthouse and the surrounding square were shot in Monticello, Georgia, and the courthouse scenes were shot in a set in Covington, Georgia, used for In the Heat of the Night. The prison scenes were shot in a real, working prison (Lee Arrendale State Prison in Alto, Georgia) and the prisoners appearing as extras were actual convicts.

== Music ==
One of the songs featured in the film, "Bible Belt", was originally about "an adulterous assistant preacher" and sung by Travis Tritt. Tritt rewrote the lyrics to reflect Pesci's titular character. It is not included in the soundtrack, which consists of film score cues by Randy Edelman.

== Reception ==
=== Box office ===
With a budget of $11 million, My Cousin Vinny was more successful than anticipated, grossing $52,929,168 domestically and $11,159,384 internationally, bringing its overall worldwide total to $64,088,552.

=== Critical response ===
On Rotten Tomatoes, the film holds a rating of 85%, based on 61 reviews. The site's consensus reads, "The deft comic interplay between Joe Pesci and Marisa Tomei helps to elevate My Cousin Vinny's predictable script, and the result is a sharp, hilarious courtroom comedy." On Metacritic the film has a score of 68 out of 100 based on reviews from 23 critics. Audiences polled by CinemaScore gave the film a grade of "A−" on an A+ to F scale.

Roger Ebert of the Chicago Sun-Times gave the film 2.5 stars out of 4. He thought that despite Macchio's co-star billing, the actor was given little to do, and the film seemed adrift until "lightning strikes" with the final courtroom scenes, when Gwynne, Pesci, and Tomei all gave humorous performances. Ebert's television partner, Gene Siskel of the Chicago Tribune, liked the film more, singling out Dale Launer's screenplay for praise. Owen Gleiberman of EW described it as a "lumbering, amiably stupido fish-out-of-water comedy" without the wit of Doc Hollywood. Yet he admired the dynamic between Pesci and Tomei: "Punch and Judy gone Brooklyn." Kathleen Maher of The Austin Chronicle thought it was "a good-natured comedy" that rose "above its simple-minded premise and its promise of humor in stereotypes." She disliked how the film seemed to divert "from what we know good and well is going to happen", yet believed watching it was "time pleasantly spent."

=== Awards and nominations ===
Award	Category	Nominee(s)	Result	Ref.
Academy Awards	Best Supporting Actress	Marisa Tomei	Won	
American Comedy Awards	Funniest Actor in a Motion Picture (Leading Role)	Joe Pesci	Won	
American Comedy Awards	Funniest Actress in a Motion Picture (Leading Role)	Marisa Tomei	Nominated	
American Comedy Awards	Funniest Supporting Actor in a Motion Picture	Fred Gwynne	Nominated	
Chicago Film Critics Association Awards	Best Supporting Actress	Marisa Tomei	Nominated	
Chicago Film Critics Association Awards	Most Promising Actress	Marisa Tomei (also for Chaplin)	Won	
MTV Movie Awards	Best Breakthrough Performance	Marisa Tomei	Won	
MTV Movie Awards	Best Comedic Performance	Joe Pesci	Nominated	

=== Retrospection ===
My Cousin Vinny performed well in home video sales and rentals and received frequent play on cable television. Some of the film's quotes have become well known.

Austin Pendleton's role as a stuttering and ineffective public defender reminded him of his teenage years, when he suffered. He did not like being publicly associated with the character. In 2022, he said that he felt the role nearly ended his career. After receiving angry letters from stutterers, he regretted agreeing to perform the role. Casting director David Rubin said that Pendleton's scenes, while funny, probably would have been changed significantly in a newer movie.

== Legal accuracy ==
The film's director, Jonathan Lynn, has an English law degree from the University of Cambridge, and lawyers have praised the accuracy of My Cousin Vinny's depiction of courtroom procedure and trial strategy, with one stating that "[t]he movie is close to reality even in its details. Part of why the film has such staying power among lawyers is because, unlike, say, A Few Good Men, everything that happens in the movie could happen—and often does happen—at trial". One legal textbook discusses the film in detail as an "entertaining [and] extremely helpful introduction to the art of presenting expert witnesses at trial for both beginning experts and litigators"; furthermore, criminal defenders, law professors, and other lawyers use the film to demonstrate rules of evidence, voir dire, relevance, and cross-examination.

Judge Richard Posner of the U.S. Court of Appeals for the Seventh Circuit, one of the most prominent American federal judges of the late 20th century, praised My Cousin Vinny as being:

particularly rich in practice tips: how a criminal defense lawyer must stand his ground against a hostile judge, even at the cost of exasperating the judge, because the lawyer's primary audience is the jury, not the judge; how cross-examination on peripheral matters can sow serious doubts about a witness's credibility; how props can be used effectively in cross-examination (the tape measure that demolishes one of the prosecution's eyewitnesses); how to voir dire, examine, and cross-examine expert witnesses; the importance of the Brady doctrine ... how to dress for a trial; contrasting methods of conducting a jury trial; and more.

In "Ten Things Every Trial Lawyer Could Learn From Vincent La Guardia Gambini", federal judge Joseph F. Anderson praised Vinny's courtroom methods as "a textbook example" of Irving Younger's "Ten Commandments of Cross-Examination", and wrote that the film predicted the U.S. Supreme Court's 1999 decision Kumho Tire Co. v. Carmichael and its holding regarding the Daubert standard, which governs when expert witnesses can testify in U.S. federal trials. He concluded that Lynn and scriptwriter Dale Launer "have given our profession a wonderful teaching tool while producing a gem of a movie that gives the public at large renewed faith in the common law trial and the adversarial system as the best way to determine the truth and achieve justice". In a 2019 decision, Merrick Garland, then the Chief Judge of the United States Court of Appeals for the District of Columbia Circuit, wrote "In 1992, Vincent Gambini taught a master class in cross-examination," and further extensively quoted from a cross-examination scene in the film.

John Marshall Law School professor Alberto Bernabe wrote that "Vinny is terrible at the things we do teach in law school, but very good at the things we don't":

[How to] interview clients, to gather facts, to prepare a theory of a case, to negotiate, to know when to ask a question and when to remain quiet, to cross examine a witness forcefully (but with charm) in order to expose the weaknesses in their testimony

Supreme Court of the United States Justice Antonin Scalia cited My Cousin Vinny as an example of the principle that a client can choose his own lawyer. The authors of Reel Justice: The Courtroom Goes to the Movies (2006) gave the film its highest rating along with several films based on real trials, such as Judgment at Nuremberg and Breaker Morant. In 2008 the ABA Journal ranked the film #3 on its list of the "25 Greatest Legal Movies", and in 2010 ranked Pesci's character as #12 on its list of "The 25 Greatest Fictional Lawyers (Who Are Not Atticus Finch)".

Lynn, an opponent of capital punishment, believes that the film expresses an anti-death penalty message without "preaching to people", and demonstrates the unreliability of eyewitness testimony. Lawyers find the film appealing, according to the director, because "there aren't any bad guys", with the judge, prosecutor, and Vinny all seeking justice. Lynn stated that both he and Launer attempted to accurately depict the legal process in My Cousin Vinny, favorably comparing it to Trial and Error, for which he could not make what he believed were necessary changes.

== Other media ==
=== Cancelled sequel ===
While being interviewed on March 14, 2012, screenwriter and co-producer Dale Launer talked about a sequel he had written involving Vinny Gambini practicing law in England. After Tomei dropped out, the studio hired another screenwriter to rewrite the script without Tomei's character, but the project was eventually shelved.

=== Unauthorized Indian remake ===
In 2009, 20th Century Fox. the producers of My Cousin Vinny, served legal notice on production company BR Films and director Ravi Chopra alleging his film Banda Yeh Bindaas Hai blatantly plagiarised their film. The lawsuit was settled for $200,000, and the film was never theatrical released.

=== Novel series ===
In 2017, author Lawrence Kelter began a My Cousin Vinny novel series with Back to Brooklyn, which is intended to be in the spirit of The Thin Man series. With the setting updated to contemporary times, the series depicts the further cases of Vinny Gambini with Mona Lisa operating as his investigator. After additionally writing a novelization of My Cousin Vinny alongside the first sequel, a third book, titled Wing and a Prayer, was published in August 2020.

=== Album ===
Pesci reprised the Vinny Gambini character for his 1998 album Vincent LaGuardia Gambini Sings Just for You, which contains the song "Yo, Cousin Vinny". The album cover portrays Pesci in a red suit similar to the usher suit he wore in the film.
