= The RCA Victor Show =

American television series (1951–1954)

- Also known as: The Dennis Day Show
- Written by: Ted Mills
- Directed by: Sidney Smith
- Starring: Ezio Pinza; Dennis Day
- Music by: David Rose
- Country of origin: United States

Original release
- Network: NBC
- Release: November 23, 1951 – August 2, 1954

The RCA Victor Show is a 1950s American television program broadcast on NBC that eventually became The Dennis Day Show. It began on November 23, 1951, and ended on August 2, 1954.

== The RCA Victor Show ==
=== With Ezio Pinza ===
The RCA Victor Show originally starred Ezio Pinza. It was also known as The Ezio Pinza Show and as The RCA Victor Show Starring Ezio Pinza. When it premiered on November 23, 1951, Pinza headed the weekly 30-minute program.

Initially, each episode began with Pinza in a set representing his "luxurious penthouse apartment". Pinza welcomed the audience and sang, then went out of the apartment, where he met the episode's guest star. The setting returned to the apartment, where Pinza and the guest sang . At the end of an episode, Pinza was once again alone at home, singing a final number. The show's format changed beginning with the April 11, 1952, episode, when the program moved from New York to Hollywood. Each episode became a self-contained dramatic story that featured Pinza and guest stars. The musical element was provided by "appropriate songs woven into the general plot line". The new version was produced and written by Ted Mills. Sidney Smith was the director. David Rose arranged music and directed the orchestra for the show. Pinza's final episode was broadcast on June 19, 1952.

Guest stars on Pinza's episodes included Patricia Morison, Harpo Marx, Eddy Arnold, Rosemary Clooney, Margaret Truman, Nancy Davis, Patrice Munsel, Ezra Stone, and Beatrice Lillie.

Some newspaper columnists took issue with the way Pinza was used in the program. Bob Lanigan, of the Brooklyn Eagle noted Pinza's singing talent ("Let the man sing — he's marvelous at it.") but wrote that when episodes were built around Pinza as an actor, they were undermined by "this fellow's complete ineptness as an actor." Dwight Newton, writing in the San Francisco Examiner, called Pinza "a fabulous personality, a magnificent voice, a man of heroic stature, one who has captured the imagination of the public" but added that the show was diminished by "Trite writing, poor production, cheap comedy." James Abbe wrote in the Oakland Tribune about an episode in which Pinza prepared spaghetti: "Even with his fine Italian voice and diction, the ham is always so much in evidence when Ezio Pinza is acting, that it must surely clash with properly seasoned spaghetti".

=== With Dennis Day ===
Singer Dennis Day became part of The RCA Victor Show on February 8, 1952. His episodes were broadcast on alternate weeks with those featuring Pinza. Day portrayed himself, a singer who worked on The Jack Benny Program. Day's mother felt that he was not paid enough and that he should find a new career. In contrast, his girlfriend, Kathy, supported him in his current situation. Verna Felton portrayed Day's mother, and Kathy Phillips played his girlfriend. Paul Henning was the producer. Day's episodes were also known as The RCA Victor Show Starring Dennis Day.

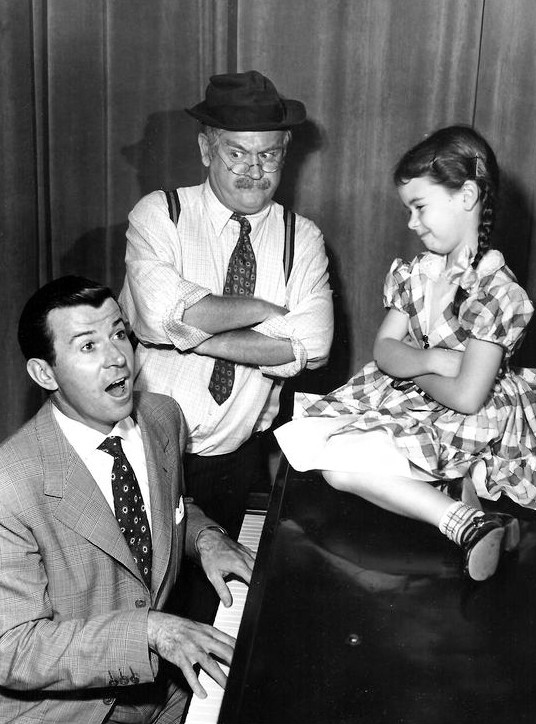
Day, Cliff Arquette (as Charley Weaver) and Jeri Lou James from The RCA Victor Show

When the show returned on October 3, 1952, after summer hiatus, Pinza was gone, and Day's episodes were broadcast weekly with a revised format. Day still played himself, but this time as a "swinging young bachelor", and his residence was a luxurious apartment in Hollywood. Characters had been added to the cast. Cliff Arquette played janitor Charlie Weaver, Minerva Urecal played landlady Mrs. Pratt, and Hal March played himself as a neighbor. Lois Butler played Lois Sterling, a new girlfriend for Day, and Jeri Lou James played her little sister, Susan, who lived with Lois. Harry Zimmerman and his orchestra provided music. Episodes were broadcast live.

== The Dennis Day Show ==
The program returned in the fall of 1953 as The Dennis Day Show, and it was on film. The format continued from the previous year, but characters were added. Weaver had a girlfriend, Lavinia (played by Ida Moore). Lois Sterling was gone, although Susan remained in the cast. Day had a new girlfriend, Peggy (played by Barbara Ruick). In 1954, she was replaced by yet another girlfriend, Marian (played by Carol Richards). Stanley Shapiro, Joseph Stanley, and John Rich were the directors, with Stanley and Henning as producers. Writers included Parke Levy and Stanley Adams.

A review in the trade publication Billboard offered the opinion that the Day program "does not look as if it will amount to a serious threat" against the popularity of its competition, I Love Lucy. The review described Day as a "mild, innocuous fellow", the show's other characters as "mild, innocuous creatures", and parts of the episode reviewed as "mild, innocuous entertainment". The show ended on August 2, 1954.

== Episode status ==
Three episodes of The Dennis Day Show are housed at the UCLA Film and Television Archive, and the Wisconsin Center for Film and Theater Research has two episodes.
