= A Time to Remember =

A Time to Remember may refer to:

- A Time to Remember (album), a 2009 album by The Dubliners
- A Time to Remember (film), a 2003 American drama television film
- A Time to Remember (novel), a 1986 novel by Stanley Shapiro
