= Ida Moore =

American actress (1882–1964)

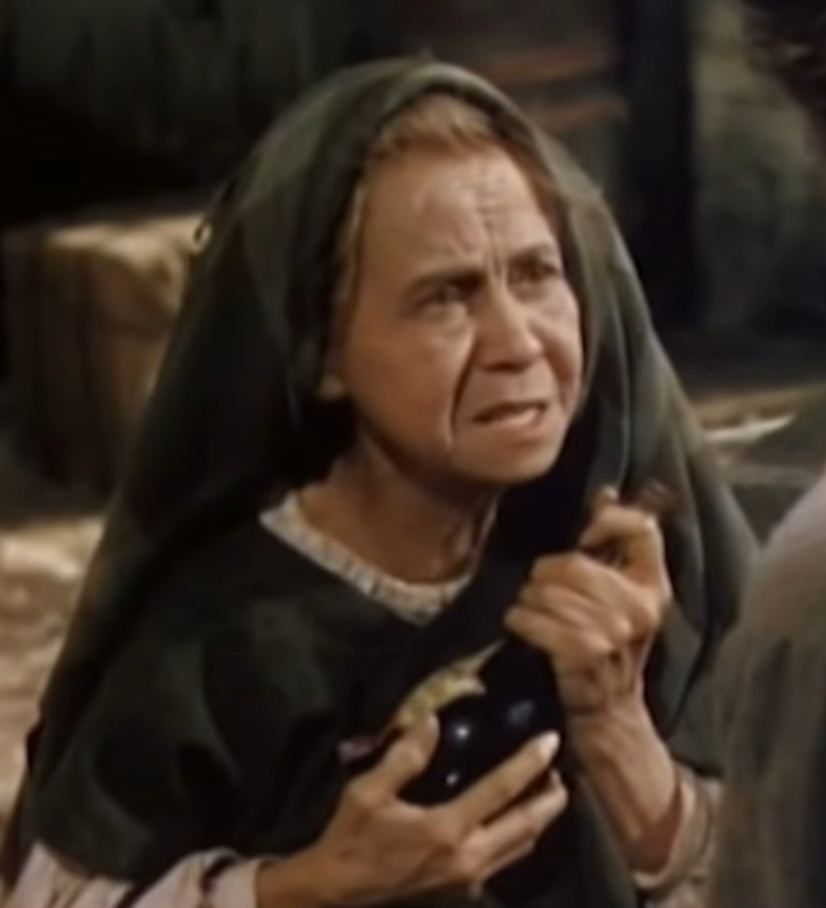
- Moore in The Inspector General (1949)
- Born: March 1, 1882; Altoona, Kansas, U.S.
- Died: September 26, 1964 (aged 82); Los Angeles, California, U.S.
- Resting place: Oakwood Memorial Park Cemetery
- Occupation: Actress
- Years active: 1925–1959

Ida Moore (March 1, 1882 – September 26, 1964) was an American film and television actress.

== Early life ==
Moore was born in Altoona, Kansas as the daughter of Mr. and Mrs. Marvelton Moore.

== Career ==
Moore's first professional work had her singing to accompany silent films. She then toured England and South Africa entertaining with a partner. After she returned to the United States, she performed in road companies of plays, including Street Scene. Just before she could make a screen test for Paramount Pictures, her mother became sick, causing Moore to return to Columbus, Ohio, where she ran a restaurant for her mother and acted in amateur productions. She returned to Hollywood after her mother died. She also worked on television programs, including a 1958 episode of Alfred Hitchcock Presents titled "Bull in a China Shop".

== Death ==
Moore died in Los Angeles, California on September 26, 1964, at the age of 82. She is interred in Oakwood Memorial Park Cemetery in Los Angeles County, California.

== Filmography ==
- Lightnin' (1925 film) (1925) as Courtroom Observer (uncredited)
- The Merry Widow (1925 film) (1925) as Innkeeper's Wife (uncredited)
- Thank You (1925 film) (1925) as Gossiping Woman
- Cutie on Duty (Short) (1943) as Nosey Neighbor
- The Ghost That Walks Alone (1944) as Cornelia Coates (uncredited)
- She's a Soldier Too (1944) as Julia Kittredge
- The Soul of a Monster (1944) as Mrs. Kirby (uncredited)
- The Town Went Wild (1944) as Mrs. Annie Jones (uncredited)
- Once Upon a Time (1944 film) (1944) as Gossipy Woman on Subway (uncredited)
- The Girl in the Case (1944) as Witness to Peeping Tom (uncredited)
- Riders of the Santa Fe (1944) as Luella Tucker
- Reckless Age (1944) as Customer (uncredited)
- Hi, Beautiful (1944) as Landlady (uncredited)
- Her Lucky Night (1945) as Mama
- Girls of the Big House (1945) as 'Mother' Fielding
- Eadie Was a Lady (1945) as Maid (uncredited)
- I'll Tell the World (1945 film) (1945) as Old Woman (uncredited)
- Rough, Tough and Ready (1945) as Nan (uncredited)
- Easy to Look At (1945) as Sadie (uncredited)
- She Wouldn't Say Yes (1945) as Spinster on Train (uncredited)
- How Doooo You Do!!! (1945) as Elderly Guest (uncredited)
- The Windjammer (1945 film) (1945) as Grandmother
- To Each His Own (1946) as Miss Claflin
- The Bride Wore Boots (1946) as Mrs. Walsh (uncredited)
- The Dark Mirror (1946) as Mrs. O'Brien (uncredited)
- The Show-Off (1946) as Mrs. Ascot (uncredited)
- From This Day Forward (1946) as Hairdresser (uncredited)
- Talk About a Lady (1946) as Gossip (uncredited)
- Cross My Heart (1946 film) (1946) as Little Lady Juror (uncredited)
- Gentleman Joe Palooka (1946) as Committee Woman (uncredited)
- It's a Joke, Son! (1947) as Whipple Sister
- Easy Come, Easy Go (1947) as Angela Orange
- The Egg and I (1947) as Old Lady
- I'll Be Yours (1947) as Cleaning Woman (uncredited)
- The Long Night (1947) as Lady with Birdcage (uncredited)
- High Barbaree (1947) as Old Lady (uncredited)
- Champagne for Two (Short) (1947) as Mrs. Benjamin Cowdy
- Host to a Ghost (Short) (1947) as Widow Parkhurst
- Good Sam (1948) as Old Lady who broke her glasses (uncredited)
- Money Madness (1948) as Mrs. Ferguson
- Return of the Bad Men (1948) as Mrs. Moore (uncredited)
- Johnny Belinda (1948) as Mrs. McKee
- Shed No Tears (1948 film) (1948) as Bus Passenger (uncredited)
- Dream Girl (1948 film) (1948) as Matron (uncredited)
- Rusty Leads the Way (1948) as Mrs. Mungy (uncredited)
- Manhattan Angel (1949) as Priscilla Lund (uncredited)
- The Sun Comes Up (1949) as Sally (uncredited)
- Leave It to Henry (1949) as Aunt Martha
- Ma and Pa Kettle (1949) as Emily
- Hold That Baby! (1949) as Faith Andrews
- The Story of Molly X (1949) as Judy (uncredited)
- Rope of Sand (1949) as Woman (uncredited)
- Dear Wife (1949) as Blowsy Woman (uncredited)
- Roseanna McCoy (1949) as Old Woman at Campfire (uncredited)
- The Inspector General (1949 film) (1949) as Old Villager (uncredited)
- Paid in Full (1950) as Dorothy (uncredited)
- Backfire (1950) as Sybil (uncredited)
- Fancy Pants (1950) as Bessie / Betsy (uncredited)
- Let's Dance (1950) as Mrs. McGuire (uncredited)
- Mr. Music (1950) as Aunt Amy
- Mother Didn't Tell Me (1950) as Old Lady (uncredited)
- Harvey (1950 film) (1950) as Mrs. McGiff (scenes deleted)
- The Lemon Drop Kid (1951) as Mrs. Feeney the Bird Lady
- Comin' Round the Mountain (1951) as Granny McCoy
- Leave It to the Marines (1951) as Grandma Meek
- Bannerline (1951) as Mrs. Small (uncredited)
- Honeychile (1951) as Harriet
- Show Boat (1951) as Little Old Lady (uncredited)
- Double Dynamite (1951) as Sewing Room Supervisor (uncredited)
- Scandal Sheet (1952) as Needle Nellie (uncredited)
- Just This Once (1952) as Mrs. Morgan the Landlady
- The First Time (1952) as Old Lady (uncredited)
- Something to Live For (1952) as Old Woman with Dog (uncredited)
- Carson City (1952) as Spinster on Stagecoach (uncredited)
- Rainbow 'Round My Shoulder (1952) as Martha Blake
- Scandal at Scourie (1953) as Mrs. Ames
- A Slight Case of Larceny (1953) as Old Lady Motorist (uncredited)
- The Country Girl (1954) as First Woman (uncredited)
- Desk Set (1957) as Old Lady
- Rock-A-Bye Baby (1958) as Miss Bessie Polk

== Television appearances ==
- Front Page Detective (1951) (Season 1 Episode 17: "Napoleon's Obituary")
- The George Burns and Gracie Allen Show (1952) (Season 2 Episode 13: "Gracie's Engagement Ring") as Jane
- The George Burns and Gracie Allen Show (1952) (Season 2 Episode 14: "Harry and the Gold Digger") as Jane the Wardrobe Mistress
- I Love Lucy (1953) (Season 2 Episode 19: "The Club Election") as Mrs. Knickerbocker
- The Ford Television Theatre (1953) (Season 1 Episode 34: "Sweet Talk Me, Jackson")
- The Jack Benny Program (1953) (Season 3 Episode 6: "Dr. Jekyll and Mr. Hyde")
- The RCA Victor Show a.k.a. The Ezio Pinza Show (1953-1954) as Lavinia
- Rocky Jones, Space Ranger (1954) (Season 1 Episode 33: "Vena and the Darnamo") as Mrs. Pilkington
- Where's Raymond? (1954) (Season 1 Episode 22: "Will You Be My Cook?") as Old Lady
- The Adventures of Ozzie and Harriet (1955) (Season 3 Episode 13: "Missing Sandwiches") as Mrs. Hutchins
- Cavalcade of America (1956) (Season 5 Episode 10: "Pursuit of a Princess") as Miss Liz
- The People's Choice (1956) (Season 1 Episode 32: "Sock, the Fund Raiser") as Little Old Lady Pickpocket
- The Adventures of Hiram Holliday (1956) (Season 1 Episode 11: "Dancing Mouse") as Mrs. Hotchkiss
- Alfred Hitchcock Presents (1958) (Season 3 Episode 26: "Bull in a China Shop") as Miss Birdie
- Alfred Hitchcock Presents (1959) (Season 4 Episode 23: "I'll Take Care of You") as Kitty
- The Jack Benny Program (1959) (Season 10 Episode 6: "Pasadena Fan Club")
- The Adventures of Ozzie and Harriet (1959) (Season 7 Episode 34: "Darby, the Rockhound") as Mrs. Albright

She also appeared on 11 episodes of The Dennis Day Show from 1952 to 1954.

  - (Season 1 Episode 1) (1952) as Lavina, Charley's Girlfriend
  - (Season 1 Episode 2) (1952) as Lavina
  - (Season 1 Episode 3: "Grandpa Day's Leprechaun") (1952) as Lavina
  - (Season 1 Episode 4: "Jack Benny") (1952) as Lavina
  - ("Jealous Neighbor Husband") (1953) as Lavina
  - (Season 3 Episode 3: "Charlie's Birthday") (1953) as Lavina
  - (Season 3 Episode 6) (1953) as Charley's Girlfriend
  - (Season 3 Episode 19: "Girlfriends Gifts Switch") (1954) as Charley's Girlfriend
  - (Season 3 Episode 27: "Party Pooper") (1954) as Charley's Girlfriend
  - (Season 3 Episode 29: "Ann Blyth / Johnny Carson") (1954) as Charley's Girlfriend
  - (Season 3 Episode 33: "Wilhelmina Ogg") (1954) as Charley's Girlfriend
