= That Touch of Mink =

1962 film by Delbert Mann

- Theatrical release poster
- Directed by: Delbert Mann
- Written by: Stanley Shapiro; Nate Monaster
- Produced by: Stanley Shapiro; Martin Melcher
- Starring: Cary Grant; Doris Day; Gig Young; Audrey Meadows
- Cinematography: Russell Metty
- Edited by: Ted J. Kent
- Music by: George Duning
- Color process: Eastmancolor
- Production companies: Granley Company; Arwin Productions; Nob Hill Productions
- Distributed by: Universal Pictures
- Release date: June 14, 1962
- Running time: 99 minutes
- Country: United States
- Language: English
- Box office: $17.6 million

That Touch of Mink is a 1962 American romantic comedy film directed by Delbert Mann, and starring Cary Grant, Doris Day, Gig Young and Audrey Meadows.

== Plot ==
Cathy Timberlake, a New York career woman looking for a job, walks to the unemployment office to collect her check. There, she is subjected to the unwanted advances of office clerk Beasley, after which she meets business executive Philip Shayne when his Rolls-Royce Silver Cloud splashes her dress with mud while on her way to a job interview. Philip wants to make up for the incident and upon meeting, the two discover a strong mutual attraction.

Cathy watches Philip as he speaks at a UN session and as their relationship develops, Philip proposes a romantic affair, while Cathy holds out for marriage. Cathy's roommate, Connie, advises her to break up with Philip, for Connie believes Philip is only interested in seducing Cathy.

In a minor subplot, Philip's financial manager, Roger, sees a therapist to discuss his guilt about helping his boss with numerous sexual conquests (including Cathy). But the therapist, who is discreetly absent from the room when Cathy's name is mentioned, believes that Roger is considering having an affair with Philip.

Philip wines and dines Cathy nightly, even spending one date at a Yankees game, sharing the dugout with Roger Maris, Mickey Mantle, and Yogi Berra (although Cathy ends up getting kicked out of the dugout). This particular conquest however, weighs on Philip's conscience, so he withdraws an invitation to take her to Bermuda. This only serves to make Cathy indignant and in order to assert her independence, she agrees to go. While in Bermuda, she is anxiety-ridden over the evening's sexual implications and as a result, comes down with a nervous rash, much to her embarrassment and Philip's frustration. Later, a second Bermuda trip is attempted, but this time Cathy drinks whiskey to soothe her nerves and winds up intoxicated, falling off the hotel balcony onto an awning below. She is then carried in her pyjamas through the crowded lobby, back to the room.

At the urging of Roger and Connie, who are convinced Philip is in love with her, Cathy plans a motel rendezvous with Beasley to make Philip jealous. Her plan succeeds and she and Philip are later married, although on their honeymoon, he breaks out in a nervous rash himself. The film ends with Cathy and Philip months later, walking with their baby and Roger through a park. The two leave Roger alone with the baby for a few moments, during which time his therapist approaches him to ask how things are going with Philip. In response, Roger joyously displays the baby, causing another misunderstanding on the therapist's part.

== Cast ==
- Cary Grant as Philip Shayne
- Doris Day as Cathy Timberlake
- Gig Young as Roger
- Audrey Meadows as Connie
- Alan Hewitt as Dr. Gruber, Roger's therapist
- John Astin as Everett Beasley
- Richard Sargent as Harry Clark
- Joey Faye as short man
- Laurie Mitchell as showgirl
- John Fiedler as Mr. Smith
- Willard Sage as Tom Hodges
- Jack Livesey as Dr. Richardson
- Jon Silo as Mario, headwaiter
- Yogi Berra as himself
- Mickey Mantle as himself
- Roger Maris as himself
- Dorothy Abbott as stewardess (uncredited)
- Richard Deacon as Mr. Miller (uncredited)
- Ralph Manza as cab driver (uncredited)
- William Lanteau as Leonard (uncredited)

== Production ==
Cary Grant was a big fan of The Honeymooners and Audrey Meadows in particular, and was responsible for getting her the part of Connie.

In her autobiography, Doris Day wrote that Cary Grant was very professional and exacting with details, helping her with her wardrobe choices for the film and decorating the library set with his own books from home. However, he was a completely private person, totally reserved, and very distant. Their relationship on this film was amicable, but totally devoid of give-and-take.

When Doris Day's character is shown a list of potential husbands for her, one of the names on the list is Rock Hudson, Day's co-star in Pillow Talk, Lover Come Back, and Send Me No Flowers. In fact, Hudson had expected to be cast as Philip, but director Delbert Mann wanted Cary Grant.

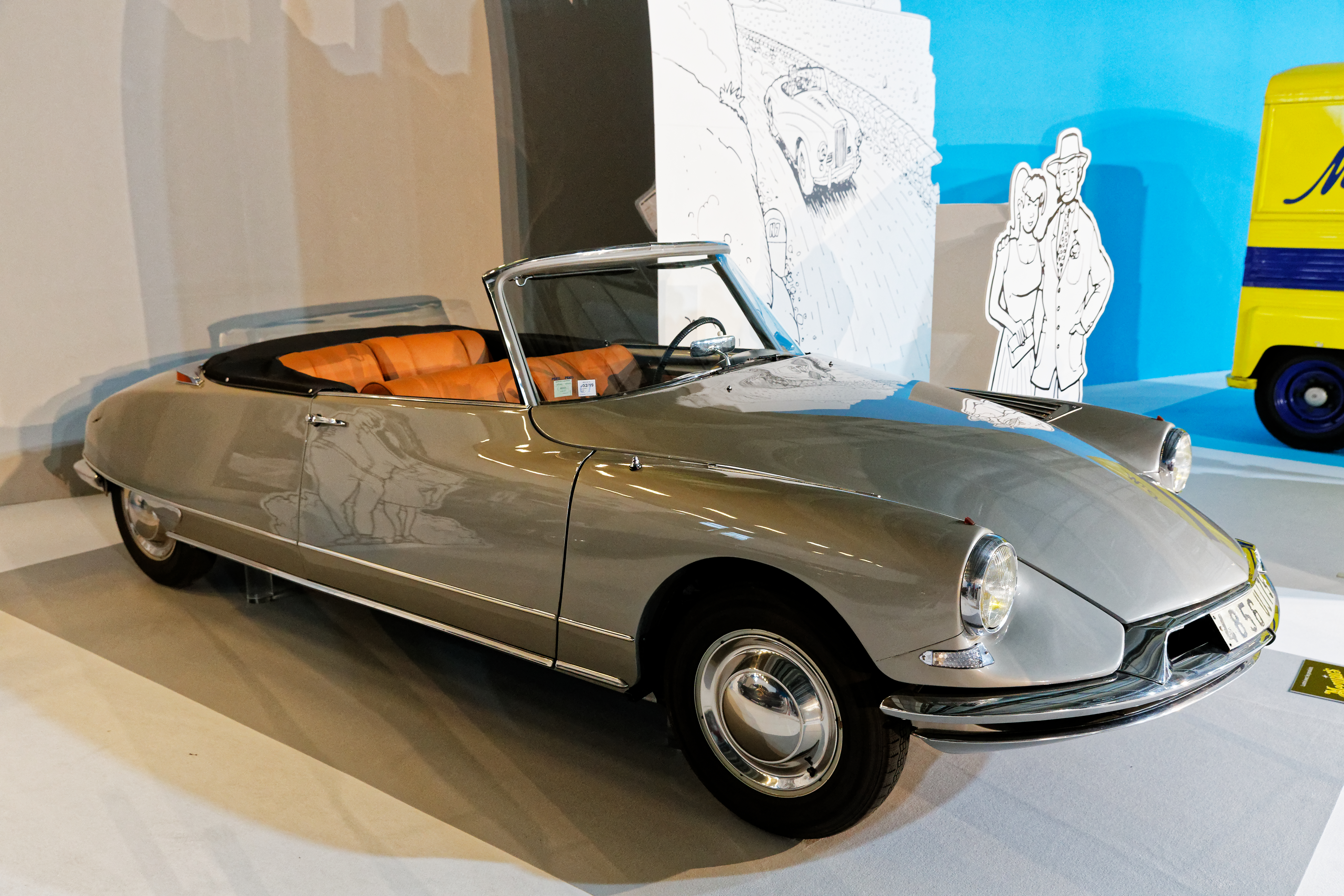
1961 Citroën DS 19 Décapotable Usine

A news item in the July 20, 1961 Daily Variety noted that Cary Grant had "telephoned the French automotive company, Citroën, to order a new car for use in the film." The factory reportedly shipped “the display model” to the studio without hesitation and the car is prominently featured in the film, garnering key publicity for the new roadster model, the Citroën DS 19 Décapotable Usine.

== Release ==
The film grossed $17.6 million at the box office, earning $7.9 million in theatrical rentals in the United States and Canada. It was the 4th highest-grossing film of 1962. It was the fastest film to gross over $1,000,000 at a single theatre, reaching that milestone in five weeks at Radio City Music Hall in New York and was there for another five weeks setting a theatre record gross at the time of $1.9 million.

== Reception ==
Review aggregator Rotten Tomatoes gives the film an approval rating of 78% based on reviews from 9 critics.

The Daily Variety film review on May 9, 1962, noted "The gloss of That Touch of Mink, however, doesn't obscure an essentially threadbare lining," while "Miss Day...certifies herself an adept farceur with this outing."

Critic Emanuel Levy notes that "Day performs with some charm her familiar type, the world’s oldest virgin, a professional who demands to be treated with respect and doesn’t believe in living in sin; legit marriage and wedding ring should come before sex. Just watch the horror on her face, when she notices a single bed in Philip’s Bermuda suite"

The Movie Channel notes "They look dated, silly, even prudish to us today, but back in the late 50s and early 60s, Doris Day starred in a series of comedies built around the question of will she or won't she have sex with him? that were the beginnings of a change in the depiction of adult relationships on screen...one thing was new here: the frank acknowledgement that certain adults, particularly those lucky enough to live and dress well in swinging Manhattan, were having sex without benefit of marriage. And this was an occasion not for scandal or tragedy but for slightly risqué humor."

== Awards and honors ==
Award	Category	Nominee(s)	Result
Academy Awards	Best Story and Screenplay – Written Directly for the Screen	Stanley Shapiro and Nate Monaster	Nominated
Academy Awards	Best Art Direction – Color	Alexander Golitzen, Robert Clatworthy and George Milo	Nominated
Academy Awards	Best Sound	Waldon O. Watson	Nominated
Bambi Awards	Best Actress – International	Doris Day	Nominated
Golden Globe Awards	Best Motion Picture – Musical or Comedy		Won
Golden Globe Awards	Best Actor in a Motion Picture – Musical or Comedy	Cary Grant	Nominated
Laurel Awards	Top Comedy		Won
Laurel Awards	Top Male Comedy Performance	Cary Grant	Won
Laurel Awards	Top Female Comedy Performance	Doris Day	Won
Laurel Awards	Top Male Supporting Performance	Gig Young	Won
Writers Guild of America Awards	Best Written American Comedy	Stanley Shapiro and Nate Monaster	Won

=== American Film Institute ===
- 2002: AFI's 100 Years...100 Passions – Nominated

== Paperback novelization ==
In May 1962, Fawcett's line of Gold Medal Books issued a paperback novelization by-lined John Tessitore. It is unknown if this is the author's actual name or a pseudonym; novelization work tended to go to seasoned authors, and during that era, the "Tessitore" by-line only ever appeared on three Gold Medal film tie-ins. In any event, the novel is written in the first person, from the POV of Doris Day's character Cathy Timberlake.

== Cultural reference ==
In his Pulitzer Prize-winning novel A Confederacy of Dunces, author John Kennedy Toole suggests, without naming names of the movie or its stars, that the novel's protagonist, Ignatius J. Reilly sees the movie at his local theater in New Orleans. The plotline is clearly identified and numerous injurious remarks are made railing off to his fellow cinemagoers at large.

== See also ==
- List of American films of 1962
