= Leave It to the Marines =

1951 film by Sam Newfield

- Film poster
- Directed by: Sam Newfield
- Written by: Orville H. Hampton
- Produced by: Sigmund Neufeld
- Starring: Sid Melton
- Cinematography: Jack Greenhalgh
- Edited by: Carl Pierson
- Music by: Bert Shefter
- Distributed by: Lippert Pictures
- Release date: September 28, 1951 (North America)
- Running time: 65 min
- Country: United States
- Language: English

Leave It to the Marines is a 1951 American Lippert Pictures black-and-white comedy film produced by Sigmund Neufeld, directed by Sam Newfield and starring Sid Melton.

== Plot ==
Gerald Meek applies for a marriage license but mistakenly enlists in the United States Marine Corps.

== Cast ==
- Sid Melton as Gerald Sylvester Meek
- Mara Lynn as Myrna McAllister
- Gregg Martell as Sgt. 'Foghorn' McTaggert
- Ida Moore as Grandma Meek
- Sam Flint as Col. Flenge
- Douglas Evans as Gen. Garvin
- Margia Dean as Cpl. Trudy 'Tootie' Frisbee
- Richard Monahan as Pvt. Partridge
