= Three's a Crowd (1969 film) =

1969 television film by Harry Falk

- Genre: Comedy
- Teleplay by: Nate Monaster; Harry Winkler
- Story by: Nate Monaster
- Directed by: Harry Falk
- Starring: Larry Hagman; Jessica Walter
- Theme music composer: Tommy Boyce; Bobby Hart
- Country of origin: United States
- Original language: English

Production
- Producer: Jon Epstein
- Cinematography: Lothrop B. Worth
- Editor: William Martin
- Running time: 90 minutes
- Production company: Screen Gems

Original release
- Network: ABC
- Release: December 2, 1969

Three's a Crowd is a 1969 American made-for-television comedy film starring Larry Hagman, who was starring in the hit sitcom I Dream of Jeannie at the time. The film was directed by Harry Falk for Screen Gems, the production company behind I Dream of Jeannie. The film's title tune was written, performed and produced by Boyce and Hart, who wrote and produced several of the Monkees' hits as well as songs for Little Anthony and the Imperials, Del Shannon, Fats Domino, Paul Revere and the Raiders, Chubby Checker and the theme song to Days of Our Lives. The duo also appeared with Hagman in an episode of I Dream of Jeannie. The film originally aired as the ABC Movie of the Week on December 2, 1969.

== Plot ==
Jim Carson is a pilot whose wife Ann disappears and is presumed dead. Seven years later, she re-appears. Meantime, Jim has met and married Jessica. He really loves both wives and hasn't the heart to tell either one of them about the other. They both throw a birthday party for him at the same time and in the same hotel, but on different floors. He tries to get away with his charade and finally enlists the aid of the elevator boy. Jim goes to a psychiatrist to try to figure out his "problem". The psychiatrist drools over both wives's pictures and tells Jim what a fool he is to want to give them up. Jim, who runs an air freight service between two cities, spends one night with Ann and the next with Jessica. Both women are physically active, having him doing all kinds of sports, and are just wearing him to a frazzle. That's when he goes to see the psychiatrist.

== Cast ==
- Larry Hagman as Jim Carson
- Jessica Walter as Jessica Carson
- E. J. Peaker as Ann Carson
- Harvey Korman as Doctor Pike
- Farrah Fawcett as hitchhiker
- Norman Fell as Norman, the elevator operator
- Stu Gilliam as Ralph Wilcox
- Mickey Deems as drunk
- Shelley Morrison as Mona
- Alfred Dennis as Rico
- Roy Stuart as Buzzy Grant
- Ken Greenwald as George Fowler
- Sue Taylor as Fran Preeble
- Michael Lerner as Sid Bagbay
- Rosemary Eliot as Liz
- Paul Vaughn as Oscar Preeble
- Gordon Devol as bellboy
- Stefani Warren as Connie Dodson
- Bobby Pickett as Roy Dodson (as Bob Pickett)
- Maggie Malooly as Madge Bagby
- Nicky Blair as waiter
- Chet Stratton as Mr. Pomeroy
- Vivian Rhodes as beauty operator

== See also ==
- List of American films of 1969
