= Heidi Vaughn =

American actress (born 1941 or 1942)

- Vaughn with her husband in 1964
- Occupation: Television actress
- Spouse: Paul Vaughn (m. 1962)
- Children: 2

Heidi Vaughn (née von Guenthner; born 1941 or 1942) is an American actress and painter. Born in California, she grew up in Kailua-Kona, Hawaii. In the 1960s, Vaughn performed in Off-Broadway and Broadway productions and in television series. She modeled for magazine advertisements including for a Bethlehem Steel ad that appeared in Time and Newsweek in 1967.

== Biography ==
Heidi von Guenthner was born in 1941 or 1942 in San Francisco Bay Area, California, to Fred C. and Jean von Guenthner. She has two older brothers, including Dirk. Fred was a vice president of Volcanite Company, a manufacturer of prestressed concrete. His company paid for a vacation to Hawaii after he had finished a construction project ahead of schedule. Several years later, he moved his family from California to Hawaii around 1959. Von Guenthner was raised in Kailua-Kona, Hawaii, where she took rides on porpoises and went wild boar hunting.

When she was 11 years old, von Guenthner taught swimming at her family's swimming pool to raise the funds to purchase her first oil paints. When she was 12 years old, Von Guenthner started learning how to make oil paintings. She attended high school in Walnut Creek, California, during which she served as a children's hospital chairman. She is a swimmer and diver who without using an Aqua-Lung has dove up to 75 feet (23 m) deep. Von Guenthner studied at Scripps College and later studied fine arts and commercial design at the Honolulu Academy of Arts' Professional Art School. At Scripps College, she performed in the drama group Siddons. After she performed in the group's performance of The Second Man, an S. N. Behrman play, talent scouts from Hollywood noticed her and had her do screen tests. She took art classes at the California College of Arts and Crafts during her summer breaks. Scripps College gave her a Merit Award, the college's top accolades, in 1960, making her one of only three students to get it that academic year.

In October 1961, the All Japan Confectionary association held a meeting in Honolulu. A kimono show was hosted for the visitors featuring Asian models with dark hair. Since she had long blonde hair, she was selected to be in the kimono show to create a visual difference with them. Zenuemon Okamato, who was president of the confectionery company Surugaya, saw her in the show and chose her to go on a cultural tour in Japan, where she would be part of a Rotary International initiative. In January 1962, she exhibited her oil painting "Girl With a Banjo" at the "Poodles and Paintings" art show in Honolulu's Ala Moana Center Banquet Hall. In February 1962, she appeared as a 14-year-old girl in the play Five Finger Exercise at the Honolulu Community Theatre, earning positive reviews for her performance. While the play was showing, Von Guenthner was invited to showcase her paintings at the theater.

Von Guenthner married Paul Fithian on October 31, 1962, in Honolulu. He had studied at the University of Madrid, received a degree from Middlebury College, and was a vice president of the travel company Greeters of Hawaii. She had met him when they were both involved in Under the Yum Yum Tree, an Oumansky Magic Ring Theatre production being made in Honolulu and they began dating five months after meeting. They took the ocean liner Lurline to San Francisco, where she had family, to hold a second marriage celebration. After her marriage, she became known as Heidi Von Guenthner Fithian and Heidi Vaughn. The couple had a son, Kirk, in 1965. They later had a daughter, Kimberley.

Following her marriage, she moved to New York City with her husband to take on acting and modeling jobs. The couple took on modeling jobs from Perkins Modeling Agency and performed together in a January 1964 Off-Broadway production of the play Once in a Lifetime. Her husband did voice acting to promote multiple products. She was featured on four pages of the lifestyle magazine Today's Charm in 1964 and in the interior decorating magazine House Beautiful's June 1964 edition. That year, Vaughn appeared in The Donna Reed Show and a television commercial promoting 7 Up featured her. After she became pregnant, she was featured in the May 1965 edition of Babytalk magazine. In the mid-1960s, Vaughn played the 15-year-old girl, Phoebe Smith, for two years in the television series The Edge of Night. She was featured in a Bethlehem Steel ad that was shot at New York's Madison Square Garden and printed in March 1967 in Time and Newsweek. Later that year, Vaughn starred alongside Paul Ford in the Broadway play What Did We Do Wrong? at the Helen Hayes Theatre.

Around 1968, she and her family moved from New York to California. Referring to her son, she said in an interview that year that she "wanted Kirk to know what grass is. In New York, kids don't know what grass is." She had a home in the San Fernando Valley in 1969. By 1969, she had been a guest performer in four television series including in Hawaii Five-O, which was filmed in Hawaii and The High Chaparral, which was filmed in the desert of Arizona. Vaughn appeared in the Death Valley Days episode "A Full House", which was filmed in Pipe Spring, Arizona. That year, she was featured on the cover of Aloha-TV Magazine. Vaughn was guest star on the television series Young Dr. Kildare in 1972.

Vaughn is a painter. By 1965, her paintings had fetched prices of up to $500 each. She met Henry Fonda, a painting enthusiast, during a dinner. Upon learning she was painter, he gave her tips about watercolor painting. Vaughn planned to host a show in New York in 1965 featuring her paintings.

== Personal life ==
Vaughn is married to Paul Vaughn, an American television actor. He is known for playing the recurring role of Paul in the American sitcom television series Cheers. He guest-starred in television programs including Fantasy Island, Cannon and I Dream of Jeannie. He also played Oscar Preeble in the television film Three's a Crowd.
