= Harry Falk (director) =

American film and television director

- Born: Harry George Falk Jr. March 15, 1933; New York City, NY, U.S.
- Died: April 29, 2016 (aged 83); Santa Monica, California, U.S.
- Occupations: Film and television director
- Years active: 1961–1989
- Spouses: Patty Duke (m. 1965; div. 1969); Candace Falk (m. 1988)
- Children: 1

Harry George Falk Jr. (March 15, 1933 – April 29, 2016) was an American film and television director. He directed the 1969 television film Three's a Crowd.

== Early life ==
Falk was born in New York City to a Catholic family. His family moved to California after his father, a former policeman, got a job as a gaffer.

== Career ==
Falk began his career, as an assistant director on television commercials and for the television series The Defenders, in 1961. Later in his career, Falk directed many television programs, as his credits include, The Patty Duke Show, Get Smart, The Partridge Family, That Girl, Hawaii Five-O, The Doris Day Show, The Mod Squad and The Courtship of Eddie's Father.

In 1975, Falk was nominated for a Primetime Emmy Award in the category Outstanding Directing in a Drama Series for an episode of The Streets of San Francisco. He directed miniseries programs in his career, as directing The Sophisticated Gents, Beulah Land and Centennial. He retired in 1989, as his last work on directing the television film High Desert Kill.

== Death ==
Falk died in April 2016 at his home in Santa Monica, California, at the age of 83.
