= Running Against Time =

1990 American science fiction television film

- VHS artwork
- Genre: Science fiction
- Based on: A Time to Remember by Stanley Shapiro
- Teleplay by: Stanley Shapiro; Robert Glass
- Directed by: Bruce Seth Green
- Starring: Robert Hays; Catherine Hicks; Sam Wanamaker
- Music by: Don Davis
- Country of origin: United States
- Original language: English

Production
- Executive producers: Pat Finnegan; Sheldon Pinchuk
- Producer: David Roessell
- Cinematography: Brian R. R. Hebb
- Editor: Heather Jo MacDougall
- Running time: 92 minutes
- Production companies: Finnegan/Pinchuk Productions; MCA Television Entertainment; Coastline Partners

Original release
- Network: USA Network
- Release: November 21, 1990

Alternative VHS artwork

Running Against Time is a 1990 American science fiction television film directed by Bruce Seth Green, written by Stanley Shapiro and Robert Glass, and starring Robert Hays, Catherine Hicks, and Sam Wanamaker. Based on Shapiro's 1986 novel A Time to Remember, the film is about a college professor who travels back in time in an attempt to prevent the assassination of John F. Kennedy. The film was Shapiro's final work; it aired on the USA Network on November 21, 1990, four months after his death, and was dedicated to his memory.

== Plot ==
David Rhodes is a college history professor, who is obsessed with the death of his older brother Chris in Vietnam in 1966. When his girlfriend Laura interviews eccentric physics professor Dr. Koopman about his revolutionary time travel theories, David finds that the Professor has perfected time travel and sees a way to save his brother; by preventing the 1963 assassination of President John F. Kennedy on the basis Kennedy will pull troops out of Vietnam.

David materialises on the roof of the Texas School Book Depository on the day of the assassination but fails to stop Lee Harvey Oswald killing Kennedy and is framed by Oswald. Charged with murder, he is unable to provide satisfied explanations to authorities, especially when he lets slip knowledge of Oswald’s life. Jack Ruby, who originally shot Oswald, kills David. Seeing this reported in old newspapers, Laura goes back to the day before the assassination, but is hit by a car and spends a day at Parkland Memorial Hospital. Recovering and fleeing the hospital, she too fails to prevent the assassination but saves David from capture. David learns his younger self has gone into a coma due to his mind being in two places at once. They contact 1963’s Koopman and convince him they are from the future before they are arrested. Armed with their knowledge, Koopman warns the new President Lyndon B. Johnson about the Vietnam War; this only makes Johnson commit to a more brutal version of the war.

Present-day Koopman goes back to intercept David and Laura, and successfully convinces them not to interfere with history. However, David makes a brief visit to his brother, who promises he look after his ill brother. After the trio return to the present, David proposes to Laura, before they find the talk with his brother convinced him not to enlist and that he is alive.

== Cast ==
- Robert Hays as David Rhodes
- Catherine Hicks as Laura Whittaker
- Sam Wanamaker as Hendryk Koopman, Ph.D.
- Wayne Tippit as FBI Agent Landry
- James DiStefano as Lee Harvey Oswald
- Paul Scherrer as Chris Rhodes
- Brian Smiar as President Lyndon B. Johnson
- Milt Tarver as FBI Agent Clemens
- Russ Marin as Chris's Doctor
- Julie Ariola as Mrs. Rhodes
- Duncan Gamble as Mr. Rhodes
- Damion Stevens as Young David
- Michael Whaley as Security Guard
- Will Dean as Captain Will Fritz

== Reception ==
Ken Tucker, writing for Entertainment Weekly called the movie "simultaneously solemn and wacky" but "not without charm". The LA Times compared it unfavorably to the Back to the Future films.

== See also ==
- Assassination of John F. Kennedy in popular culture
