= Nate Monaster =

American screenwriter

- Born: Nathan Monaster; September 22, 1911; Chicago, Illinois, U.S.
- Died: May 12, 1990 (aged 78); Los Angeles, California, U.S.
- Occupation: Screenwriter
- Spouse: Gladys Monaster
- Children: 3

Nathan Monaster (September 22, 1911 – May 12, 1990) was an American screenwriter. He wrote for radio, television, film and stage, and was president of Writers Guild of America from 1963 to 1965. The 1962 comedy That Touch of Mink, which he co-wrote with Stanley Shapiro, won the Writers Guild of America Award win for Best Written American Comedy, and was nominated for an Academy Award.

== Life and career ==
Monaster was born and raised in Chicago, Illinois. He began his career writing for radio shows such as Duffy's Tavern and The George Burns and Gracie Allen Show. He then moved to work on television programs including The Donna Reed Show, Bachelor Father, The Milton Berle Show, The Real McCoys and Hey, Jeannie!. He also taught writing at San Diego State University, where he taught Gary David Goldberg whose early career he encouraged.

Monaster was president of Writers Guild of America from 1963 to 1965. He wrote a Broadway play in 1964, Something More!, which was based on the 1962 novel Portofino P.T.A., by Gerald Green. Working with Harry Winkler, he co-wrote the 1969 television film Three's a Crowd, starring Larry Hagman, Jessica Walter and E. J. Peaker.

== Death ==
Monaster died of heart failure at the Cedars-Sinai Hospital on May 12, 1990, in Los Angeles, California, at the age of 78.
