= Sylvia Lewis =

American actress

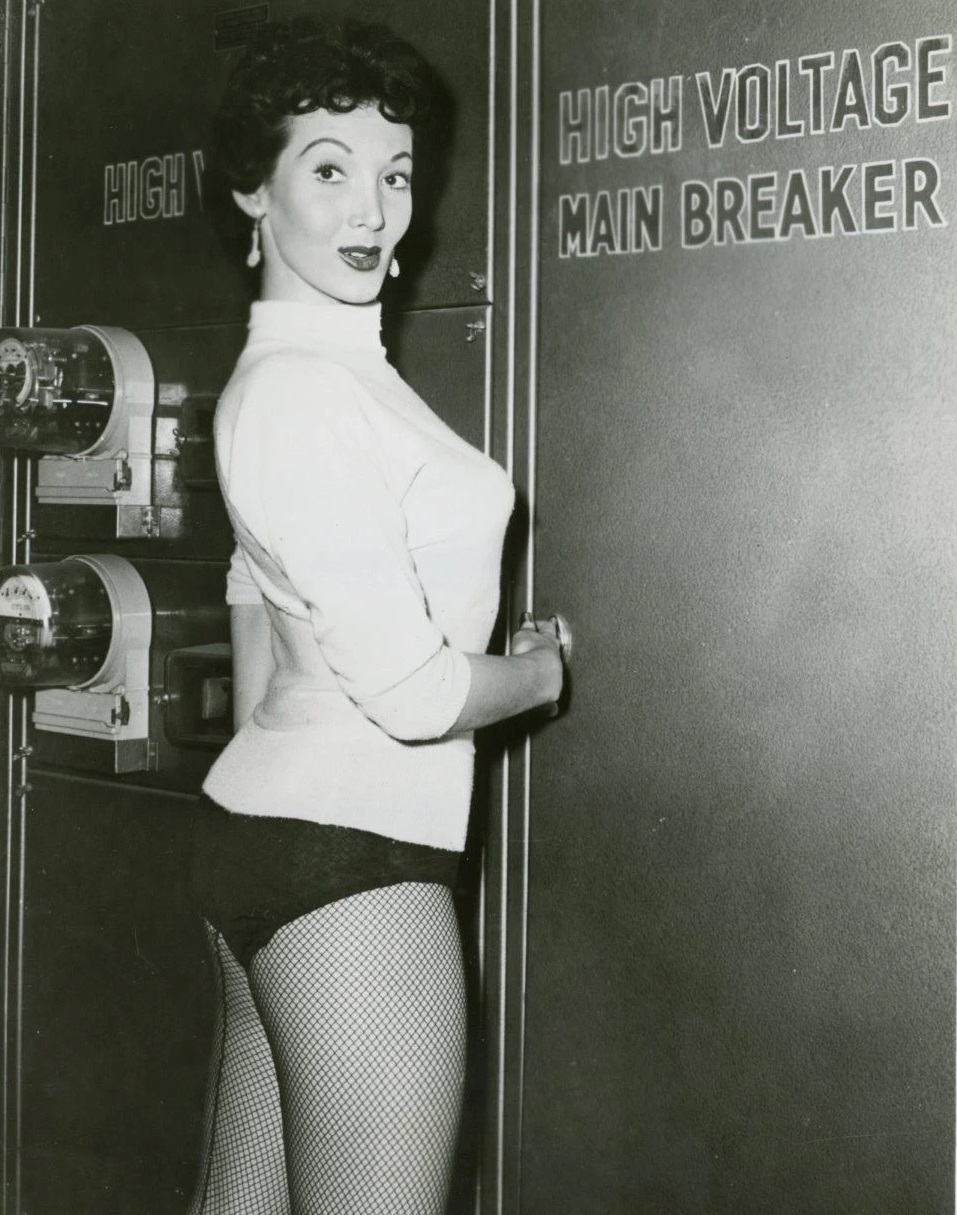
- Lewis in 1954
- Born: April 22, 1931 (age 95); York, Pennsylvania
- Occupations: Actress, dancer
- Years active: 1952–1990
- Website: www.sylvialewis.net

Sylvia Lewis (born 1931) is an American television and stage actress, dancer and choreographer. Lewis began performing when she was 5. Classically trained, she acted and danced on stage and in film. In 1955 she added choreographer and dancing coach to her coach as a regular on the 1950s television series Where's Raymond?. Her first film job as a choreographer was in the 1956 film Hot Blood. Lewis was also the choreographer on the sitcom Who's the Boss? throughout its 8 year run.

== Early life and education ==
Sylvia Levin was born in York, Pennsylvania on April 22, 1931, the daughter of Velma Levin. She began performing when she was 5. She first performed as a young child in Baltimore, Maryland at the end of vaudeville era. When she was 10, Levin obtained a scholarship to the Peabody Conservatory of Music, where she studied dance, voice and piano. She went to Hollywood when she was twelve.

== Career ==
In 1956, Lewis as she was now known appeared in The Conqueror, where she danced with John Wayne in the film. Lewis appeared in the 1961 film The Ladies Man where she played Miss Cartilage and danced with star Jerry Lewis.

Lewis was working as an assistant for Hal Belfer at Universal International, when she was asked to audition for the 1950s television series Where's Raymond? She became a regular on the show in which she played a dancer, as well as being a choreographer for the untrained lead actor. In 1955, she got her first job as a choreographer of the film Hot Blood. She went on to provide choreography for many television shows.

In 1961, she starred in the play "On The Town" at the Music Circus. The following year, she appears in a stage production of The Desert Song.

Lewis was the choreographer on Who's the Boss? for 8 years and also on Married... with Children. She also had guest appearances on the The Dick Van Dyke Show, The Beverly Hillbillies, Gomer Pyle, U.S.M.C. and others.

In 1995, she appeared in the show Fabulous Palm Springs Follies.

== Personal life ==
Lewis got married in 1955 and had at least one child, a daughter.

== Filmography ==
- The Las Vegas Story (1952)
- Harem Girl (1952)
- Singin' in the Rain (1952)
- She's Working Her Way Through College (1952)
- Just for You (1952)
- Hans Christian Andersen (1952)
- Androcles and the Lion (1952)
- Siren of Bagdad (1953)
- Cruisin' Down the River (1953)
- Those Redheads from Seattle (1953)
- Gunsmoke (1953)
- Drums of Tahiti (1954)
- Red Garters (1954)
- Bedlam in Paradise (1955)
- The Lieutenant Wore Skirts (1956)
- The Conqueror (1956)
- Cha-Cha-Cha Boom! (1956)
- The Ladies Man (1961)
- Hook, Line, and Sinker (1969)

== Television work ==
- The Colgate Comedy Hour (1951–1952) (Supporting player / dancer)
- Where's Raymond? (1953–1955) (Series regular)
- The George Burns and Gracie Allen Show (1956) (Guest appearance)
- The Bob Cummings Show (1956–1958) (Series regular / 2 Guest appearances)
- Steve Canyon (1958) (Guest appearance)
- The Dennis O'Keefe Show (1959) (Guest appearance)
- Zorro (1959) (Guest appearance)
- Peter Gunn (1959) (Guest appearance)
- Johnny Staccato (1959) (Guest appearance)
- The New Steve Allen Show (1959) (Sketch performer)
- The Dick Van Dyke Show (1963) (Guest appearance)
- The Danny Kaye Show (1963) (Guest appearance)
- Gomer Pyle, U.S.M.C. (1965) (Guest appearance)
- The Beverly Hillbillies (1965) (Guest appearance)
- The Andy Griffith Show (1965) (Guest appearance)
- The Jerry Lewis Show (1967) (Sketch performer)
