= The Hustle (film) =

2019 film directed by Chris Addison

- Theatrical release poster
- Directed by: Chris Addison
- Screenplay by: Stanley Shapiro; Paul Henning; Dale Launer; Jac Schaeffer
- Story by: Stanley Shapiro; Paul Henning; Dale Launer
- Produced by: Roger Birnbaum; Rebel Wilson
- Starring: Anne Hathaway; Rebel Wilson; Alex Sharp; Dean Norris; Timothy Simons; Ingrid Oliver
- Cinematography: Michael Coulter
- Edited by: Anthony Boys
- Music by: Anne Dudley
- Production companies: Metro-Goldwyn-Mayer Pictures; Pin High Productions; Cave 76 Productions; Camp Sugar Productions
- Distributed by: United Artists Releasing
- Release date: May 10, 2019 (United States)
- Running time: 94 minutes
- Country: United States
- Language: English
- Budget: $21 million
- Box office: $97.4 million

The Hustle is a 2019 American comedy film directed by Chris Addison, starring Anne Hathaway, Rebel Wilson, and Alex Sharp. It was written by Stanley Shapiro, Paul Henning, Dale Launer, and Jac Schaeffer. It is a female-led remake of the 1988 film Dirty Rotten Scoundrels, which is a remake of the 1964 film Bedtime Story. The film follows two women who set out to con an Internet millionaire.

The film was theatrically released in the United States on May 10, 2019, by United Artists Releasing, and internationally distributed by Universal Pictures. It received negative reviews from critics and grossed $97 million worldwide.

== Plot ==
Penny Rust is a young, Australian, small-time con artist who catfishes wealthy men, pretending to be an attractive young lady looking for love; then showing up on the first date claiming to be friends with her persona and convincing the man into giving her lots of money, which she claims will go to the said persona. Josephine Chesterfield is a young, British, sophisticated con artist who cons the world's richest men out of their money. Their idol is the legendary con artist “Medusa” whose real identity is unknown.

The two con artists meet for the first time while traveling on the French Riviera. Not willing to take a chance with any competition, Josephine tricks Penny into staying on the train. However, after realizing Penny managed to con a wealthy man whom Josephine intended to swindle, she has Penny arrested. Josephine pays Penny’s bail and advises Penny to leave the country.

While on the plane leaving France, Penny encounters a wealthy Danish man from whom Josephine stole a highly valuable piece of jewelry belonging to his wife (which he was hoping to sell to pay his gambling debts and then replace with the money he got from the original). As the jewelry was stolen, he is unable to get any money and his wife has subsequently filed for divorce. Penny is furious that she was tricked, but returns to Josephine begging to be taught how to become professional like her.

Josephine and Penny execute a complicated con act against multiple rich men called "The Lord of the Rings", stealing engagement rings. The plan works but Josephine refuses to pay Penny because she is an apprentice. Penny and Josephine wager Penny's entire net worth of $500,000 using billionaire Thomas Westerburg, the creator of a tech app called YaBurnt, as their victim.

Penny initially gains the upper hand by pretending to be blind, something that Thomas could relate to because his grandmother was also blind. Josephine, however, pretends to be a prominent eye doctor to "treat" her using unorthodox methods as a ruse to get close to Thomas. Penny uses sympathy gained by a few women at the club to have them ambush Josephine in the bathroom while she spends alone time with Thomas, but she learns that Thomas is not a billionaire and that he intends to use the last amount of his money for her instead.

She tells Josephine that the wager is off, having developed some feelings for him. Josephine changes the wager of stealing Thomas' money to stealing his feelings instead. To hold her up, Josephine tells the women Penny lied to about being blind, and they glue her hand to the wall.

Josephine later shows up at Thomas's hotel room, attempting to seduce him. Penny breaks free from the wall and learns from a hotel server that Josephine never left his room, which makes her assume that they have had sex. The next morning, Thomas admits to Penny that he paid for her eye care, but he must leave France. She gives him $500,000 and he leaves on a plane.

Josephine catches up to her, admitting that she and Thomas never had sex and that he conned her into investing $500,000 into his company. Penny realizes that she has also been conned by him; Thomas reveals via text that his grandmother was the original Medusa and he inherited her title, though his feelings for Penny were genuine.

A fortnight later, Penny is leaving Josephine's residence. Out of sympathy, Josephine gives her the money from their "Lord of the Rings" con acts. Their farewell is cut short when Thomas returns while in the middle of a con act against wealthy tourists in which he includes the two women. He suggests they work together to make even more money. They reluctantly go along with his act but demand to be paid the first $2,000,000 accruing from the scheme before they trust him. They are then shown committing a successful con during the Christmas holidays, getting along, with Penny and Thomas resuming their relationship.

A post-credits scene shows both women in one of their earlier Lord of the Rings con acts.

== Cast ==
- Anne Hathaway as Josephine "Jo" Chesterfield
- Rebel Wilson as Penny "Penn" Rust
- Alex Sharp as Thomas Westerburg
- Dean Norris as Howard Bacon
- Timothy Simons as Jeremy
- Ingrid Oliver as Brigitte Desjardins
- Nicholas Woodeson as Albert
- Rob Delaney as Todd
- Tim Blake Nelson as Portnoy
- Casper Christensen as Mathias

== Production ==
In August 2016, it was announced that Metro-Goldwyn-Mayer Pictures was developing a female-centered remake of Dirty Rotten Scoundrels (1988), which in turn is a remake of Bedtime Story (1964). The new film featured two con women, one of which was announced as Rebel Wilson. The project was a joint production, with Roger Birnbaum and Wilson producing through their studios Pin High Productions and Camp Sugar Productions, respectively. Jac Schaeffer wrote the updated script, with credit also going to the previous films' screenwriters Stanley Shapiro, Paul Henning, and Dale Launer.

In January 2017, the working title of the film was revealed to now be Nasty Women, referencing the "nasty woman" comment which Donald Trump directed at Hillary Clinton during their campaign debates. It was retitled The Hustle, with Anne Hathaway set as co-lead to Wilson. By March, Chris Addison was hired to direct, in his feature film debut. In August 2017, Alex Sharp was cast to play a male lead in the film, a tech billionaire in his early 20s who becomes the target of the wager between the two con-women.

Principal photography began during mid-September 2017 at both Pinewood Studios and Shepperton Studios in the UK, with filming also taking place at the Farnborough Airport.

== Release ==
The film was released on, May 10, 2019, by United Artists Releasing. It had previously been scheduled for August 10, 2018, and June 29, 2018, releases. Meghan Trainor recorded the song "Badass Woman" for the movie.

A special trailer for The Hustle was released to coincide with the premiere of Avengers: Endgame, and it begins by spoofing Endgame trailers. It refers to Penny and Josephine as "The Revengers" — a parody name that was also previously referenced by another film in the Marvel Cinematic Universe, Thor: Ragnarok.

== Reception ==
=== Box office ===
The Hustle grossed $35.4 million in the United States and Canada and $62 million in other territories, for a worldwide total of $97.4 million, against a production budget of $21 million. According to MGM's 2020 Q2 earning reports, the film was producing net revenue for the studio.

In the United States and Canada, the film was released alongside Pokémon Detective Pikachu, Tolkien and Poms, was projected to gross $11–15 million from 2,750 theaters in its opening weekend. The film made $4 million on its first day, Friday, including $774,000 from Thursday night previews. It went on to debut to $13.5 million, finishing third, behind Avengers: Endgame and Detective Pikachu. In its second weekend the film dropped 53%, to $6.1 million, finishing fifth, and then made $3.8 million in its third weekend, finishing eighth.

=== Critical response ===
On review aggregator Rotten Tomatoes, the film has an approval rating of 13% based on 171 reviews. The website's critical consensus reads: "The Hustle's stars might make an effective comedy team in a different setting, but this gender-flipped remake of a remake adds little beyond its feminine twist." On Metacritic, the film has a weighted average score of 35 out of 100, based on 28 critics, indicating "generally unfavorable reviews". Audiences polled by CinemaScore gave the film an average grade of "B−" on an A+ to F scale. Women made up 71% of the opening weekend demographic, and those polled by PostTrak gave the film an overall score of 73%.

Peter Travers of Rolling Stone gave the film one out of five, and wrote: "They say it's all in the timing, especially when it comes to funny business. But in The Hustle everyone's inner comedic clock is calamitously off. The setups are flat, the jokes don't land and the actors don't — or won't — connect." Peter Bradshaw of The Guardian wrote: "Anne Hathaway detonates a megaton blast of pure unfunniness in this terrifying film."

=== Accolades ===
| Award | Date of ceremony | Category | Recipients | Result | Ref. |
|---|---|---|---|---|---|
| Golden Trailer Awards | 2019 | Best Comedy Poster | The Hustle | Won | |
| People's Choice Awards | November 10, 2019 | Comedy Movie of 2019 | The Hustle | Nominated | |
| National Film & TV Awards | December 3, 2019 | Best Comedy | The Hustle | Nominated | |
| Golden Raspberry Awards | March 16, 2020 | Worst Actress | Anne Hathaway (also for Serenity) | Nominated | |
| Golden Raspberry Awards | March 16, 2020 | Worst Actress | Rebel Wilson | Nominated | |
| ASCAP London Awards | October 21, 2020 | Top Music Film Awards | Anne Dudley | Won | |
