= Dale Launer =

American screenwriter

Dale Launer (born May 19, 1952) is an American screenwriter, film director and producer, best known for his work in comedy films. His films include Ruthless People, Blind Date, Dirty Rotten Scoundrels and My Cousin Vinny.

== Biography ==
Launer was born in Cleveland, Ohio, and brought up in the San Fernando valley. He is the son of actor S. John Launer and is Jewish. He attended California State University, Northridge, where, after changing his major to Film, he recognized his desire for a job writing and directing films. His first successful screenplay was Ruthless People (1986).

In May 2007, his film Tom's Nu Heaven, which he produced, wrote and directed, won Best Picture at the Monaco Film Festival.

Launer was friends with the family of murderer Elliot Rodger. At the behest of Rodger's father, Launer attempted to advise Rodger on how to be more confident with women. After Rodger's death, Launer wrote an article for the BBC about his experience.

== Filmography ==
Year	Title	Director	Writer	Producer
1986	Ruthless People	No	Yes	No
1987	Blind Date	No	Yes	No
1988	Dirty Rotten Scoundrels	No	Yes	Executive
1992	My Cousin Vinny	No	Yes	Yes
1992	Love Potion No. 9	Yes	Yes	Yes
2005	Tom's Nu Heaven	Yes	Yes	Yes
2019	The Hustle	No	Yes	No
