= Lover Come Back (1961 film) =

1961 film by Delbert Mann

- Theatrical release poster
- Directed by: Delbert Mann
- Written by: Stanley Shapiro; Paul Henning
- Produced by: Robert Arthur; Martin Melcher; Stanley Shapiro
- Starring: Rock Hudson; Doris Day; Tony Randall
- Cinematography: Arthur E. Arling
- Edited by: Marjorie Fowler
- Music by: Frank De Vol
- Production companies: 7 Pictures Corporation; Nob Hill Productions; Arwin Productions
- Distributed by: Universal-International Pictures
- Release date: December 20, 1961 (Los Angeles)
- Running time: 107 minutes
- Country: United States
- Language: English
- Box office: $7.6 million (rentals)

Lover Come Back is a 1961 American Eastmancolor romantic comedy film released by Universal-International Pictures and directed by Delbert Mann. It stars Doris Day and Rock Hudson and is their second time working together. The supporting cast includes Tony Randall, Edie Adams, Ann B. Davis, and Donna Douglas.

Day, Hudson and Randall appeared in three movies together, the others being Pillow Talk (1959) and Send Me No Flowers (1964).

The story is similar to that of Pillow Talk in that it includes mistaken identity as a key plot device. Although not as well known as Pillow Talk, the script by Stanley Shapiro and Paul Henning earned an Academy Award nomination for Best Original Screenplay.

The film was co-produced by Hudson (through his 7 Pictures Corporation), Day (through her Arwin Productions, and Stanley Shapiro and Paul Henning (through their Nob Hill Productions).

== Plot ==
In a Manhattan advertising agency, Jerry Webster, a Madison Avenue ad executive, has achieved success not through hard work or intelligence but by wining and dining his clients and setting them up on dates with attractive women.

Jerry's equal and sworn enemy at a rival agency is Carol Templeton. Although she has never met him, Carol is disgusted by Jerry's unethical tactics and reports him to the Ad Council. Jerry avoids trouble with his usual aplomb, sending a comely chorus girl, Rebel Davis, to seduce the council members.

In exchange for her cooperation, Jerry promised Rebel a spot in commercials, so he goes ahead and arranges shoots of some featuring her for "VIP", a nonexistent product. He has no intention of allowing them to be shown, but the perplexed company president, Pete Ramsey, orders them broadcast on television.

This means Jerry must come up with a product quickly. He bribes a Nobel Prize winning chemist, Dr. Linus Tyler, to create one. When Carol mistakes Jerry for Tyler, he pretends to be the chemist, so that in her attempt to steal the account from Jerry she is actually wining, dining, golfing, and frolicking at the beach with him as Tyler.

Carol ultimately learns the truth. Her employer figures it out. When she realizes she has been deceived she leaves Jerry stranded at the beach, naked.

Appalled, she once more reports him to the Ad Council, this time for promoting a product that does not exist. Jerry, however, arrives at the hearing with VIP, a mint-flavored candy Dr. Tyler has just created. He provides many free samples to everyone there, including Carol.

VIP turns out to be intoxicating, each piece having the same effect as a triple martini. Its extreme effects lead to a one-night stand between Carol (who has a low tolerance for alcohol) and her bitter rival, Jerry, in a motel in Maryland, complete with a marriage license.

Carol has the marriage annulled. Representatives from the liquor industry visit Jerry, saying he will be paid well to pull VIP off the market and destroy the formula. Jerry convinces them to give Carol's firm 25% of its $60 million ($600 million today) annual advertising expenditures, then burns a confession that he has just signed that they mistake for the formula. He leaves New York to work in his company's San Francisco branch—only to be called back nine months later to remarry Carol in a hospital maternity ward, just before she gives birth to their child.

== Cast ==
- Rock Hudson as Jerry Webster
- Doris Day as Carol Templeton
- Tony Randall as Peter 'Pete' Ramsey
- Edie Adams as Rebel Davis
- Jack Oakie as J. Paxton Miller
- Jack Kruschen as Doctor Linus Tyler
- Ann B. Davis as Millie, Carol's Secretary
- Joe Flynn as Hadley
- Howard St. John as Mr. John Brackett
- Karen Norris as Kelly, Jerry's Secretary
- Jack Albertson as Fred
- Charles Watts as Charlie
- Donna Douglas as Deborah, Peter's Secretary
- JoAnne Ludden-Paige as Jerry Webster's girlfriend in convertible car

== Songs ==
Although not a musical, the film contains two songs sung by Day: "Lover Come Back" during the opening credits, and "Should I Surrender" as she contemplates what to do with her feelings for Linus just before finding out he was Jerry passing himself off as Dr. Tyler.

== Novelization ==
Slightly in advance of the film's release, as was the custom of the era, a paperback novelization of the screenplay was published by Gold Medal Books. The author was a renowned crime and western novelist Marvin H. Albert, who also made something of a cottage industry out of movie tie-ins. He was the most prolific screenplay novelizer of the late '50s through the '60s and, during that time, the preeminent specialist at light comedy. Albert also wrote the novelizations for one of Doris Day, Rock Hudson, and Tony Randall's other films together Pillow Talk (1959), and another romantic-comedy starring Doris Day, Move Over, Darling (1963).

== Notes ==
- Jack Oakie's final film
- The original ending had Carol and Jerry getting drunk on VIP and checking into a hotel. Doris Day insisted the concluding events be rewritten, having Carol and Jerry get married in their drunken state before going to bed.
- Remade in India in 2016 as Zoom
- Remade into the 1984 Egyptian film wahda bi whada starring Adel Imam and Mervat Ameen.

== Reception ==
The film received positive reviews from critics. Bosley Crowther of The New York Times called the film "one of the brightest, most delightful satiric comedies since It Happened One Night." Variety declared, "This is a funny, most-of-the-time engaging, smartly produced show." Harrison's Reports gave the film a rating of "GOOD", adding: "It's lots of fun most of the time even though the theme of boy fights girl, boy falls in love with girl and vice versa has been done quite often and in similar detail before." Philip K. Scheuer of the Los Angeles Times wrote, "we can testify to the frequent hilarity with which everybody concerned has infused this familiar farcical mixup, double-entendres and all." Brendan Gill of The New Yorker called the film "extremely funny and therefore not to be missed," and Richard L. Coe of The Washington Post deemed it "funny and worldly from start to finish ... Blond Doris has never been more attractive or spirited and Hudson has become an adept farceur." The Monthly Film Bulletin offered a less enthusiastic review, writing: "Alas, the aquarium scene is the film's high-water mark. After it, the sex comedy is transformed into slushy romance ... Occasionally Tony Randall’s satirical zaniness salvages a laugh, but Rock Hudson and a subdued Doris Day, who do well enough with the wisecracks earlier, put little life into the love scenes when these usurp the narrative."

== Awards and nominations ==
Award	Category	Nominee(s)	Result
Academy Awards	Best Story and Screenplay – Written Directly for the Screen	Stanley Shapiro and Paul Henning	Nominated
Golden Globe Awards	Best Supporting Actor – Motion Picture	Tony Randall	Nominated
Laurel Awards	Top Comedy		Won
Laurel Awards	Top Male Comedy Performance	Rock Hudson	Nominated
Laurel Awards	Top Female Comedy Performance	Doris Day	Won
Laurel Awards	Top Male Supporting Performance	Tony Randall	Nominated
Laurel Awards	Top Female Supporting Performance	Edie Adams	5th Place

== See also ==
- List of American films of 1961
