= Dirty Rotten Scoundrels (film) =

1988 film by Frank Oz

- Theatrical release poster
- Directed by: Frank Oz
- Written by: Dale Launer; Stanley Shapiro; Paul Henning
- Based on: Bedtime Story by Stanley Shapiro; Paul Henning
- Produced by: Bernard Williams
- Starring: Steve Martin; Michael Caine; Glenne Headly; Anton Rodgers; Barbara Harris
- Cinematography: Michael Ballhaus
- Edited by: Stephen A. Rotter; William Scharf
- Music by: Miles Goodman
- Distributed by: Orion Pictures
- Release dates: December 5, 1988 (LACMA); December 14, 1988 (United States)
- Running time: 110 minutes
- Country: United States
- Language: English
- Box office: $42 million

Dirty Rotten Scoundrels is a 1988 American comedy film directed by Frank Oz and produced by Bernard Williams. It is a remake of the 1964 film Bedtime Story, whose co-writers Stanley Shapiro and Paul Henning received screen credit for Dirty Rotten Scoundrels, along with writer Dale Launer. Set on the French Riviera, the film stars Steve Martin and Michael Caine as two con men competing to swindle a wealthy tourist (Glenne Headly) out of $50,000.

Dirty Rotten Scoundrels premiered at the Los Angeles County Museum of Art on December 5, 1988, nine days before its theatrical release by Orion Pictures. It received positive reviews from critics and grossed $42 million at the U.S. box office.

== Plot ==
Lawrence Jamieson is a sophisticated and affluent British con artist operating in the town of Beaumont-sur-Mer on the French Riviera. Aided by his manservant Arthur and amoral police official Andre, Lawrence seduces wealthy women and cons them for high-value sums by posing as an exiled prince raising money for his country's freedom fighters. While returning from a trip to Zurich, Lawrence encounters Freddy Benson, an unsophisticated American hustler who brags of conning women out of relatively meager amounts with stories of his sick grandmother.

After Freddy inadvertently interferes with Lawrence's latest target, Lawrence tricks him into leaving town. However, after meeting one of Lawrence's former victims and realizing Lawrence is a fellow con artist, Freddy returns and blackmails Lawrence into training him. Lawrence teaches Freddy his refined style of deception—with limited success—and develops a new con in which Freddy portrays his mentally disabled brother to drive away women once Lawrence has their money. Freddy quits after Lawrence refuses to pay him a portion of the ill-gotten gains. Unwilling to share his territory with Freddy, the pair agree to a bet: the first to con $50,000 from a selected victim wins and the other leaves town. They choose newly arrived tourist, the naive "United States Soap Queen" Janet Colgate.

Lawrence attempts his usual con, but Freddy intervenes, posing as a U.S. Navy veteran and psychosomatic paraplegic who needs $50,000 for treatment from psychiatrist Dr. Emil Schaffhausen. In response, Lawrence poses as Schaffhausen and agrees to treat Freddy if Janet pays him $50,000 directly. The pair compete for Janet's attention, with Lawrence tormenting Freddy under the guise of treatment, and Freddy manipulating her with a fake suicide attempt. In a nightclub, Lawrence dances with Janet and taunts Freddy, which upsets some nearby British sailors. Freddy convinces them that Lawrence stole Janet from him and the sailors agree to Shanghai Lawrence. Later, Lawrence learns that Janet is not wealthy—having won her holiday and title in a soap company competition—yet has liquidated all of her assets to help Freddy. Touched by her genuine kindness and generosity, and adhering to his personal code of never taking advantage of the poor or virtuous, Lawrence calls off the bet. Freddy counters with a new bet: the first to seduce Janet wins. Lawrence refuses to participate but agrees that if Freddy succeeds, he wins.

After Lawrence is abducted by the sailors, Freddy returns to Janet's hotel room and demonstrates his "love" for her by walking. Lawrence, who is also in the room, declares Freddy cured, having appeased the sailors by revealing his status as a Royal Naval Reserve officer. He leaves Freddy with the sailors, who haze him until the morning while Lawrence escorts Janet in order to catch a planned flight home. However, Janet returns to her hotel room to find Freddy waiting and declares her love for him. Andre informs Lawrence who prepares to accept his defeat until Janet arrives at Lawrence's villa in tears, revealing that Freddy stole the $50,000 she had collected for him. Lawrence gifts her a bag containing $50,000 of his own money and returns her to the airport, instructing Andre to arrest Freddy. Before her plane departs, Janet returns the bag to Lawrence, saying she cannot accept it. Andre arrives with Freddy who claims that Janet stole his wallet and clothes. Lawrence opens the bag and finds the money replaced with a note revealing that Janet is the Jackal, a prominent American con artist. Freddy is furious but Lawrence takes delight in having been so skillfully deceived.

A week later, Freddy and Lawrence contemplate their loss at Lawrence's villa. A group of wealthy tourists arrive led by Janet, who is posing as a high-value real estate agent. While the tourists head to the villa, Janet tells Lawrence and Freddy that, while she made millions in the previous year, taking their money was the most fun. Lawrence and Freddy assume their roles in Janet's plot as the trio prepares to scam their latest victims.

== Cast ==
- Steve Martin as Freddy Benson
- Michael Caine as Lawrence Jamieson
- Glenne Headly as Janet Colgate
- Anton Rodgers as Inspector Andre
- Barbara Harris as Fanny Eubanks
- Ian McDiarmid as Arthur
- Dana Ivey as Mrs. Reed
- Meagen Fay as Miss Trumble
- Frances Conroy as Diana
- Louis Zorich as Nikos, the Greek millionaire

== Production ==
=== Pre-production ===
The 1988 version underwent casting changes. It started as a possible vehicle for Mick Jagger and David Bowie, who approached Dale Launer to write a screenplay for them. Launer suggested a remake of Bedtime Story. Launer acquired the rights for the remake, but Bowie and Jagger dropped out to do a film with Martin Scorsese. According to Bowie, they were "a bit tweezed that we lost out on a script that could have been reasonably good." According to Splitsider, Eddie Murphy was considered for the role of Freddy Benson. John Cleese was also approached for the role of Jamieson, but declined. He admitted in a 2008 interview that he regretted doing so.

Richard Dreyfuss was also sent a script. Though he was intended for the part of Benson, a misunderstanding resulted in him preparing the part of Jamieson, so Steve Martin (who had also been asked to play Jamieson) read Benson's part instead. Oz was excited by Martin's version of Benson, and settled on this choice. Michael Caine was eventually chosen to play Jamieson. Michael Palin, who had also been considered for the role, wrote in his diary that Caine was "probably the nearest he (Oz) will get in an English actor to the effortless charisma of David Niven."

=== Filming ===
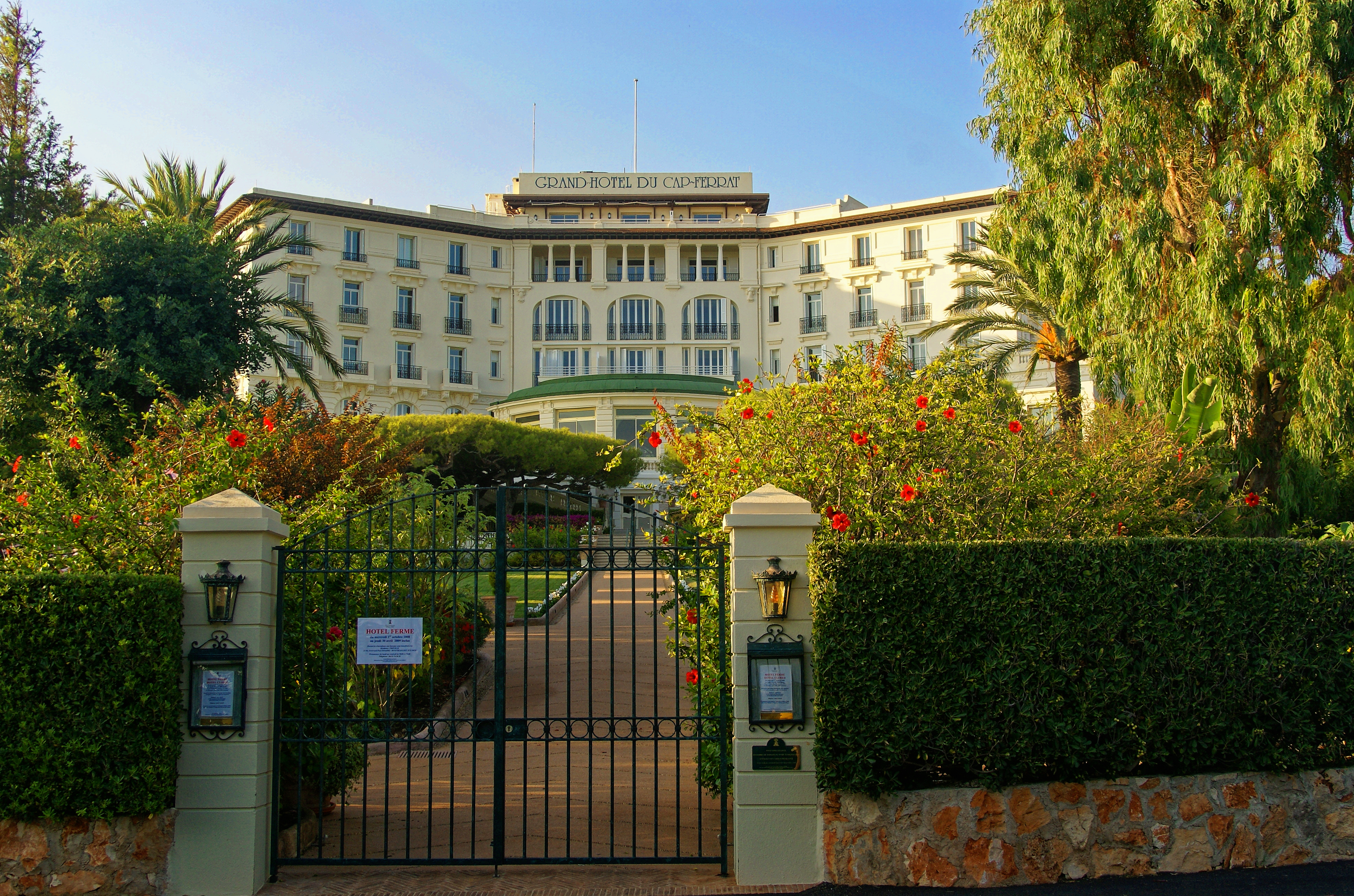
Several scenes were filmed at the Grand-Hôtel du Cap-Ferrat.

Production of the film began on June 6, 1988, and lasted through early August, finishing "six days ahead of schedule." Filming locations included Antibes, Cannes, Beaulieu-sur-Mer (depicted in the film as "Beaumont-sur-Mer"), Saint-Jean-Cap-Ferrat, Nice and Villefranche-sur-Mer. The Villa Ephrussi de Rothschild was visited by the leading characters in a scene. The estate belonging to Lawrence is a private villa (Villa Hier) located at the tip of the Cap d'Antibes.

== Release ==
=== Theatrical ===
Prior to the film's December 14, 1988 theatrical release in the United States, it premiered at the Los Angeles County Museum of Art on December 5. The studio held test screenings of the film in early October, one for a blue-collar audience and one for "more upscale", with both receiving high marks.

=== Home media ===
In a DVD extra providing a behind-the-scenes look at the making of the film, Frank Oz discusses a teaser trailer he directed for the studio, which he wanted to use for promotion before there was enough actual footage to assemble a trailer. An entire day was spent filming a scene (which in the end never made the final cut of the movie) in which Freddy and Lawrence stroll along the promenade, politely moving out of the way of other people, until Freddy casually pushes an elderly woman into the water and Lawrence nonchalantly shoves a little boy's face into his cotton candy.

== Reception ==
=== Box office ===
Dirty Rotten Scoundrels grossed $3.8 million from 1,466 theaters on its opening weekend in the United States, finishing fifth at the box office. In total it grossed $42 million in the US.

=== Critical response ===
According to the review aggregator website Rotten Tomatoes, 89% of critics gave the film a positive review based on 44 reviews, with an average rating of 7/10. The site's critics consensus called the movie "buoyant [and] clever" and praised Caine and Martin's chemistry. At Metacritic, the film has a weighted average score of 68 out of 100 based on 14 critics, indicating generally favorable reviews. Audiences polled by CinemaScore gave the film an average grade of "B+" on an A+ to F scale.

Roger Ebert of the Chicago Sun-Times wrote that while the film was predictable, Martin and Caine's chemistry was enjoyable and "Headly provides a resilient foil." Variety called it "wonderfully crafted" and "absolutely charming" and praised the editing and music. Echoing other critics, Vincent Canby of The New York Times commended Caine and Martin's partnership and the film's divergence from "mistimed and misdirected comedies" from that time.

== Adaptations ==
In 2004, the Dirty Rotten Scoundrels musical premiered on Broadway with music and lyrics by David Yazbek.

MGM produced The Hustle in 2019, a remake starring Rebel Wilson, Anne Hathaway, and Alex Sharp.
