= Paul Henning =

American producer and screenwriter (1911–2005)

- Publicity Photo of Paul Henning
- Born: Paul William Henning; September 16, 1911; Independence, Missouri, U.S.
- Died: March 25, 2005 (aged 93); Burbank, California, U.S.
- Resting place: Tuscumbia Cemetery, Tuscumbia, Missouri
- Occupations: Television producer and writer
- Years active: 1930s–1993
- Spouse: Ruth Barth (m. 1939; died 2002)
- Children: 3, including Linda Kaye

Paul William Henning (September 16, 1911 – March 25, 2005) was an American TV producer and screenwriter. Most famous for creating the television sitcom The Beverly Hillbillies, he was also crucial in developing the "rural" comedies Petticoat Junction (1963–1970) and Green Acres (1965–1971) for CBS.

Henning also served as one of the staff writers for George Burns, writing first for the Burns and Allen radio show and then their television show throughout its broadcast run.

Author Kurt Andersen described Henning as "the Eli Whitney of American television production."

== Early life ==
Henning was born and grew up on a farm in Independence, Missouri. While working in a drugstore as a teenager, he met future President Harry S. Truman, who advised him to become a lawyer. Although he did attend the Kansas City School of Law, his ambition was to be a singer on the radio. When the local radio station KMBZ (KMBC at the time) had no money for writers to create the "filler" between songs, he became a writer as well as a singer.

== Television writer ==
Writing proved the more lucrative of the two, so he abandoned singing in order to write for series like Fibber McGee and Molly and The George Burns and Gracie Allen Show, and later TV series like The Dennis Day Show, The Real McCoys, and The Andy Griffith Show. Henning was also the creator, writer, and producer of The Bob Cummings Show, where he met many of the actors who appeared in his later series. He produced the Ray Bolger Show, and wrote (or co-wrote) screenplays such as Lover Come Back (1961, for which he was nominated for an Oscar for Best Writing: original screenplay), and (with Stanley Shapiro) Bedtime Story (1964), which was re-made in 1988 as Dirty Rotten Scoundrels (Steve Martin, Michael Caine), and again in 2019, as The Hustle (Anne Hathaway, Rebel Wilson).

== Most popular television series ==
In 1962, Henning created the CBS series, The Beverly Hillbillies—a sitcom based on his past experiences while camping in the Ozarks near Branson, Missouri. He wrote or co-wrote well over 200 of the series' 274 episodes, including every episode of seasons one, two, three, eight, and nine. (During seasons 4 through 7, he was still a frequent contributor, but wrote more frequently for Petticoat Junction.) Henning also wrote the music and lyrics for the popular theme song "The Ballad of Jed Clampett".

The Beverly Hillbillies was one of the highest-rated series of all time, and became a feature film about three decades later. After the major success of Hillbillies, CBS gave Henning another half-hour time slot on its schedule. In 1963, Petticoat Junction debuted on CBS and was a great success as well. This series had a starring role for Henning's daughter, Linda Kaye Henning, simply billed as Linda Kaye. In 1965, this was followed by Green Acres, of which Henning was only the casting director and executive producer.

All three programs were popular, achieving major ratings success during most of their runs. However, after several years, CBS began to move away from the so-called "ruralcoms" despite their still decent ratings, and move in a more "adult", "sophisticated" direction with series such as All in the Family and The Mary Tyler Moore Show. Thus, in 1971, The Beverly Hillbillies and Green Acres were canceled as a result of the "rural purge", joining Petticoat Junction (which ended the year before) in syndicated reruns.

== Personal life and death ==
He married Ruth Barth in 1939 and the couple had three children: Linda Kaye Henning, on whom Paul partially based the character of Elly May Clampett; Carol Alice Henning; and Paul Anthony Henning.

Ruth Henning often told her husband about how her female cousins and she often visited her grandparents at the tiny hotel they owned near the Rock Island railroad station located in Eldon, Missouri. This later became the concept for Petticoat Junction.

Later in life, Henning and his wife Ruth donated land to a conservation area near Branson, Missouri. The Paul and Ruth Henning Conservation Area is 1,534 acres of oak and hickory forest, steep hills, and glades with four designated trails created by the Missouri Department of Conservation, and one longer trail created largely by the members of Boy Scout Troop 2001. The site is monitored by the Missouri Department of Conservation. The area features hiking and bird watching.

Many details about Henning's personal life and career were recounted by Ruth in a 1994 manuscript that was discovered in archives and subsequently published in 2017.

Ruth Barth Henning died, aged 88, from a heart attack on January 15, 2002, at their home in Los Angeles.

Henning retired to Toluca Lake, California, and died in a Burbank hospital on March 25, 2005, aged 93. He was interred in the Tuscumbia Cemetery in Tuscumbia, Missouri.
