= Where's Raymond? =

American TV sticom

- Also known as: The Ray Bolger Show
- Genre: Sitcom
- Directed by: John Rich; Sidney Lanfield; Marc Daniels; William Asher
- Starring: Ray Bolger; Richard Erdman; Allyn Joslyn; Sylvia Lewis; Betty Lynn; Marjie Millar; Christine Nelson; Gloria Winters; Verna Felton; Ray Teal
- Composers: Herbert W. Spencer; Earle Hagen; Al Goodwin
- Country of origin: United States
- Original language: English
- No. of seasons: 2
- No. of episodes: 58

Production
- Producers: Jerry Bresler; Stanley Shapiro; Paul Henning
- Camera setup: Multi-camera
- Running time: 24–25 mins

Original release
- Network: ABC
- Release: October 8, 1953 – April 22, 1955

Where's Raymond? is an American sitcom that aired on ABC, starring Ray Bolger. The series aired from October 1953 to April 22, 1955. The series' title was spurred by Bolger's Broadway stage hit Where's Charley?

In the 1954–1955 season, the series was renamed The Ray Bolger Show.

== Synopsis ==
Bolger stars as Raymond Wallace, a song-and-dance man who is consistently barely on time for his performances. Bolger's co-stars in both seasons were Richard Erdman as Pete Morrisey, Ray's landlord and press agent and Sylvia Lewis as Sylvia, Ray's dancing partner and the series choreographer. Allyn Joslyn appeared as Jonathan Wallace, Ray's brother. Betty Lynn played Jonathan's wife June, and Frances Karath played their daughter Ginny.

In the second season, Marjie Millar played Susan, Ray's girlfriend and an aspiring writer from Iowa, and Christine Nelson portrayed Katie Jones, Susan's friend.

== Guest stars ==
- Elinor Donahue
- King Donovan
- Steve Reeves
- Irene Ryan
- William Schallert

== Production notes ==
The series was filmed by Desilu at General Service Studios in Hollywood. Where's Raymond? aired at 8:30 EST on Thursdays opposite Four Star Playhouse, an anthology series on CBS, Broadway to Hollywood on DuMont (first season) and Treasury Men in Action on NBC.

Sponsor Lehn & Fink cancelled the show at the end of its 39-week run in 1955. The trade publication Variety reported that the gross cost of each episode was $40,000, not including network time, and said that the show "never got off the ground, in the opinion of the client, and suffered in the competitive rating story."

== Reception ==
A review of Where's Raymond? in TV Guide said that the program had "a thin story line on which to base a 39-week series". It added, however, that Bolger's dancing, humor, and singing "should be enough to please most viewers".
