= A Time to Remember (novel) =

1986 Novel by Stanley Shapiro

- First edition cover
- Author: Stanley Shapiro
- Language: English
- Genre: Science fiction Alternate history
- Publisher: Random House
- Publication date: August 12, 1986
- Publication place: United States
- Media type: Print (hardcover)
- Pages: 191
- ISBN: 9780394550312

A Time to Remember is the last novel by Stanley Shapiro, a time travel thriller about the assassination of John F. Kennedy, published on August 12, 1986, by Random House.

== Plot ==
Still mourning his brother who died in Vietnam, David travels back in time to 1963 to try to prevent the assassination of President Kennedy, to save the president and his brother and all other lives lost in the war. When he gets to 1963, he is unable to stop Lee Harvey Oswald from shooting JFK and is instead arrested himself for the killing.

== Reception ==
A Time to Remember was reviewed by Kirkus Reviews, Library Journal, and Mystery File.

== Television film adaptation ==
It was adapted into a 1990 television film called Running Against Time starring Robert Hays, Catherine Hicks, and Sam Wanamaker and directed by Bruce Seth Green.

Shapiro wrote the teleplay himself (with Robert Glass as co-writer) and it was the last work written by him. Broadcast four months after Shapiro's death in Los Angeles, it was dedicated to his memory.

== See also ==
- Assassination of John F. Kennedy in popular culture
