= Stanley Shapiro =

American film producer

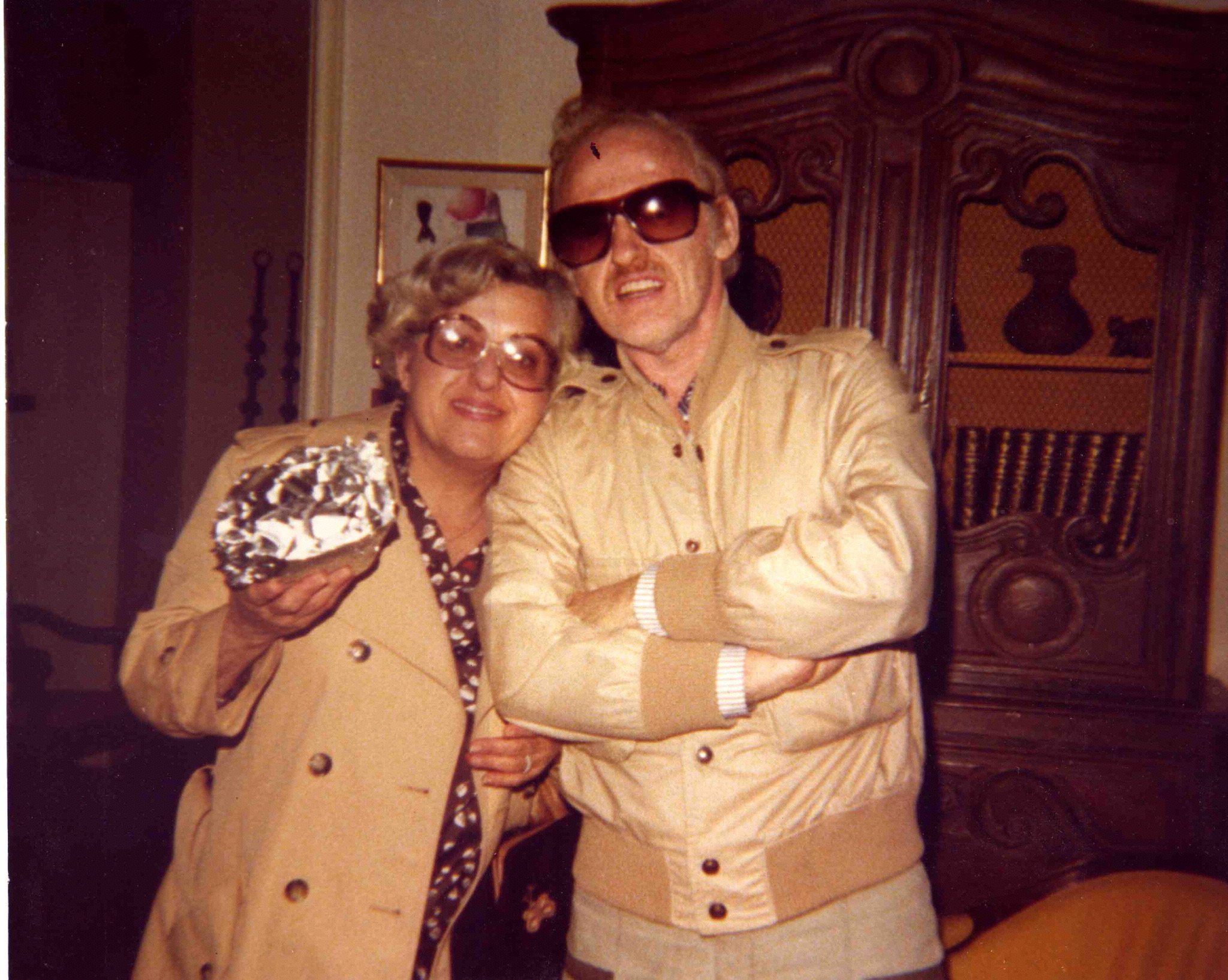
- Stanley Shapiro and sister
- Born: July 16, 1925; Brooklyn, New York
- Died: July 21, 1990 (aged 65); Los Angeles
- Occupations: Writer, screenwriter
- Years active: 1953–88

Stanley Shapiro (July 16, 1925 – July 21, 1990) was an American screenwriter and producer responsible for three of Doris Day's most successful films.

Born in Brooklyn, New York, Shapiro earned his first screen credit for South Sea Woman in 1953. His work for Day earned him Oscar nominations for Lover Come Back and That Touch of Mink and a win for Pillow Talk, and Mink won him the Writers Guild of America Award for Best Written American Comedy, which he shared with his partner Nate Monaster.

== Life and career ==
Shapiro was born and raised in Brooklyn. He was Jewish. He dropped out of Brooklyn College and began selling jokes to comedians. He eventually wrote for Fred Allen on radio and then for George Burns and Gracie Allen. He followed Burns and Allen to Hollywood and worked on their television show.

He produced the first season of Ray Bolger's ABC sitcom, Where's Raymond?, and was replaced in the second season by Paul Henning, as the series was renamed The Ray Bolger Show.

Additional writing credits include Operation Petticoat, Come September, Bedtime Story, Me, Natalie, For Pete's Sake, Dirty Rotten Scoundrels, and Carbon Copy.

"Although I find social institutions, manners, customs and prejudices a bit ridiculous, I do not regard them as a satirist", he told an interviewer in 1962. "I am a humorist. Will Rogers was a satirist, Laurel and Hardy were humorists. Believe me, humor is much harder to write. It was a lot easier for Will Rogers to get a laugh by doing a pun about the Government than it was for Laurel and Hardy to figure out a routine on how to move a piano manually from the basement to the fifth floor."

Shapiro's last project was the television movie Running Against Time, based on his novel A Time to Remember. Broadcast four months after his death from leukemia in Los Angeles, it was dedicated to his memory.

Shapiro died on July 21, 1990, five days after his 65th birthday.

== Select credits ==
- The George Burns and Gracie Allen Show (1950) (TV series) – pilot – writer
- South Sea Woman (1953) – writer
- Where's Raymond? (1954–55) (TV series) – writer, producer
- Hey, Jeannie! (1956–57) (TV series) – writer
- Strictly for Pleasure (1958) – writer
- The Real McCoys (1958) (TV series) – writer
- Pillow Talk (1959) – writer
- Operation Petticoat (1959) – writer
- McGarry and His Mouse (1960) (TV movie) – writer, producer
- The Tab Hunter Show (1960–61) – creator, producer
- Come September (1961) – writer
- Lover Come Back (1961) – writer, producer
- That Touch of Mink (1962) – writer, producer
- The Comedy Spot (TV series) (1962) (TV series) – episode "For the Love of Mike"
- Bedtime Story (1964) – writer, producer
- A Very Special Favor (1965) – writer, producer
- How to Save a Marriage and Ruin Your Life (1968) – writer, producer
- Me, Natalie (1969) – writer, producer
- For Pete's Sake (1974) – writer, producer
- The Best of Times (1974) (TV movie)
- The Seniors (1978) – writer, producer
- Carbon Copy (1981) – writer, producer
- The Ferret (1984) (TV movie)
- Dirty Rotten Scoundrels (1988)
- Running Against Time (1990) (TV movie) (book "A Time to Remember") / (teleplay)
- The Hustle (2019) remake of Dirty Rotten Scoundrels (1988)

== Other writings ==
- "The Engagement Baby" (1970) – play
- "Simon's Soul" (1977) – novel
- "A Time to Remember" (1986) – novel
