= Five O'Clock Shadow =

American pop/rock a cappella group

- Origin: Boston, Massachusetts, United States
- Genres: a cappella, rock, pop rock
- Years active: 1991–present
- Award: 2026 CARA for Best Rock Album
- Members: Dan Lennon; Paul Pampinella; Caleb Whelden; Judd Tomaselli; Scott Cobban; Noah Ogden
- Website: www.focs.com

Five O'Clock Shadow is an a cappella group from Boston, Massachusetts, that has been in existence since 1991. The band has performed on FOX News, A&E Network, ABC, ESPN and VH-1's "breakthrough" series. They have released four cassettes and six CDs, winning many Contemporary A Cappella Recording Awards.

The group has toured with many famous acts including The Boston Pops, Aaron Neville, Edwin McCain, Patti LaBelle, Kool and the Gang, Blessid Union of Souls and James Brown.

== Current members ==
- Dan Lennon - tenor (1995–present)
- Paul Pampinella - baritone (1998–present)
- Caleb Whelden - tenor (2003–present)
- Judd Tomaselli - bass (2012–present)
- Scott Cobban - vocal percussion/beatbox, baritone (2012–present)
- Noah Ogden - tenor (2025–present)

== Former members ==
Former members include

- Jim Meyers - tenor, founder (1991-1992)
- Bill Eddy - tenor (1991-2000)
- Jeff Thacher - tenor/vocal percussion (1991-1993), currently with the vocal band Rockapella
- Warren Tessier - baritone (1991-1997)
- Terry Sanger - bass (1991-1993)
- Dave Harrison - baritone/vocal banjo (1993-1997)
- Mike Mendyke - bass (1993-1998), currently with the vocal band Dick Van Dyke and The Vantastix
- Wes Carroll - tenor/vocal percussion (1993-1997), also formerly of The House Jacks
- Scott Harris - baritone (1997)
- Mike Barnicle - tenor (2001-2003)
- Steve Roslonek - tenor (1997-1998), currently performs children's music as SteveSongs
- Roopak Ahuja - tenor (2000-2001), also formerly of the vocal band MO5AIC
- Samrat Chakrabarti - vocal percussion (1997-1998)
- David "Stack" Stackhouse - vocal percussion & vocal bass ("beatbass") (1998-2012)
- Oren Malka - tenor (1997-2021)
- Jon Lavalley - tenor (2022-2025)

== Discography ==
Quintet

- Released: 1994
- Format: CD
- Tracks: "Chant", "Think Of You", "Down On The Corner", "Green Eyes", "Tribute", "Jungle Beat", "Oh, Sugar", "I Am Yours (Debbie's Song)", "Heavy Cloud, No Rain", "And When I Die"

Buzz

- Released: 1995
- Format: CD
- Tracks: "Buzz Buzz", "Get Down Tonight", "And When I Die", "Superman's Song", "Midnight Special", "Green Eyes", "Gone So Long", "Heavy Cloud No Rain", "Friend Of The Devil", "Jungle Beat", "Tribute", Oh, Sugar", "Goodnight Sweetheart, Goodnight", "All I Want", "My Side Of Your Eyes"

So There

- Released: 1998
- Format: CD
- Tracks: "Mine Tonight", "What's It All About", "Far Away", "Hold Me For A While", "Think Of You", "Stop And Say Hello", "Move On", "If You Could Only See", "Get Down Tonight/That's the Way", "Tribute"

Misfit Toys

- Released: 2000
- Format: CD
- Tracks: "Watching The Tracks", "Santa Says Rock", "Little Drummer Boy", "It's Christmas", "Silent Night"

Wonders Of The World

- Released: 2001
- Format: CD
- Tracks: "Inside Her Mouth", "Wonders of the World", "Few and Far Between", "I'm Right", "Interlude #1", "Halo", "29", "Interlude #2", "Aggression", "What's It All About", "Images", "Interlude #3", "Promise You This"

Six

- Released: 2013
- Format: CD
- Tracks: "Like You Do", "Not The Rightest", "Nobody's Waiting", "Grocery Store", "Hip To Be Square"

Originals (By Other People)

- Released: 2016
- Format: CD
- Tracks: "Bohemian Rhapsody", "Madness", "Angel", "I Will Wait", "My Type", "Love Yourself"

Time

- Released: 2024
- Format: CD
- Writer: "Caleb Whelden", "Paul Pampinella", "Shannon Phypers", "Jon Lavalley", "Tristan Smith", "Scott Cobban"
- Tracks: "Someone Else", "Something in You", "Zig Zag", "Coming Through", "Nothing on the Radio", "Today", "Come to Me", "Time", "In the End", "FATE of the World"
- Singles: "Zig Zag", "Nothing on the Radio"

All American

- Released: 2024
- Format: CD
- Writers: "Caleb Whelden"
- Tracks: "All American [Explicit]", "All American"

Time and Time Again (extended version of the album Time)

- Released: 2025
- Format: Digital
- Writer: "Caleb Whelden", "Paul Pampinella", "Shannon Phypers", "Jon Lavalley", "Tristan Smith", "Scott Cobban"
- Tracks: "Someone Else", "Something In You", "Zig Zag", "I’m Free", "Coming Through", "Nothing on the Radio", "What Are You Gonna Do", "Fine", "Today", "Always Come Back", "Come To Me", "Tonight", "Time", "In the End", "FATE of the World"
