= Kanichiro =

Kanichiro is a first name given primarily to men in Japan. Notable people with the name include:

- Kanichiro Tashiro, Japanese general (1881–1937)
- Kanichiro (actor), Japanese actor (born 1996)
- Kaichiro Kitamura, Japanese vocal percussionist and music instructor

== See also ==
- Japanese name
