= Dick Van Dyke on screen and stage =

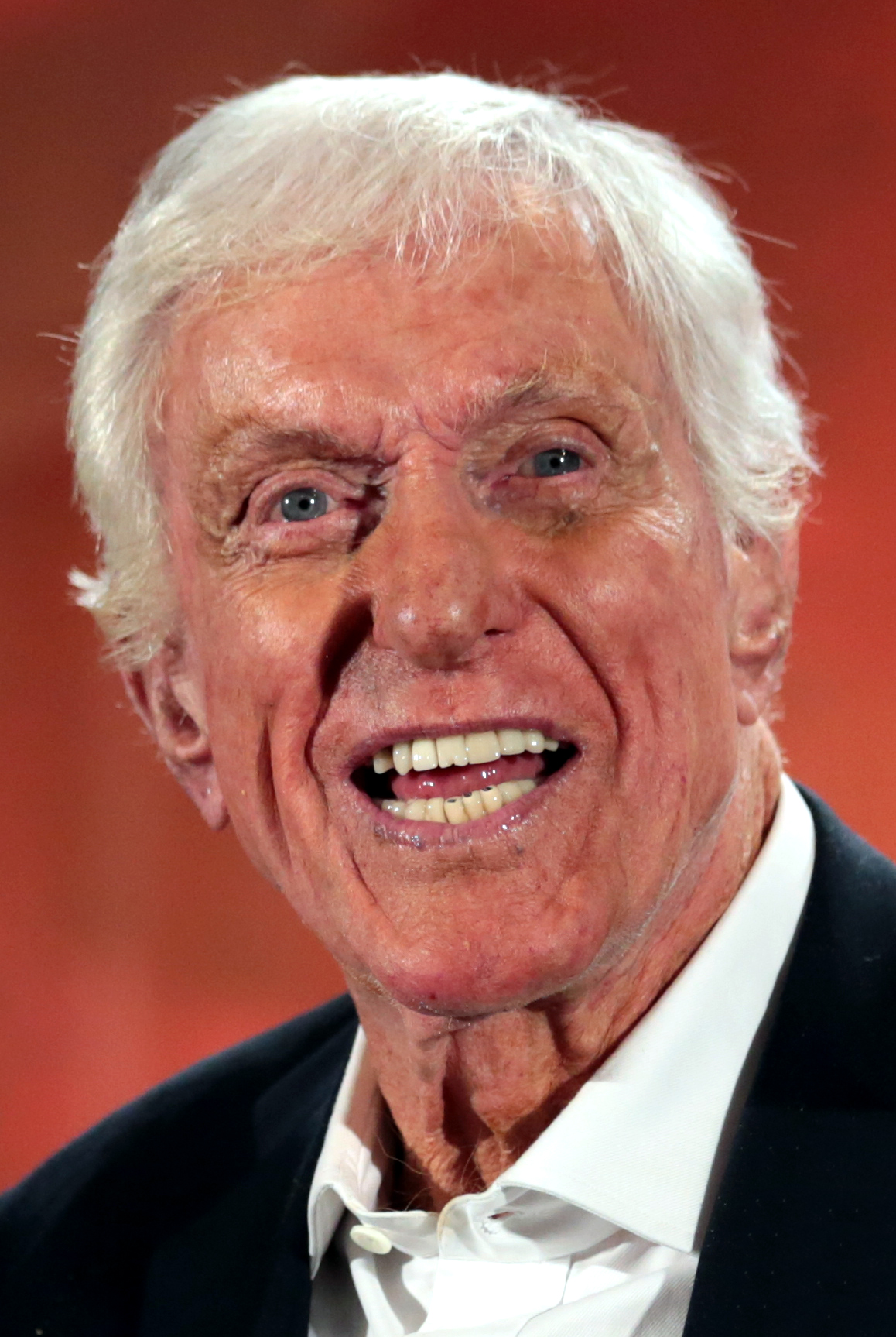
Van Dyke at the 2017 Phoenix Comicon

Dick Van Dyke (born December 13, 1925) is an American actor, comedian, singer, dancer, writer and producer. He first gained recognition on radio and Broadway, then he became known for his role as Rob Petrie on the CBS television sitcom The Dick Van Dyke Show, which ran from 1961 to 1966. He also gained significant popularity for roles in the musical films Bye Bye Birdie (1963), Mary Poppins (1964), and Chitty Chitty Bang Bang (1968).

On television, he is known for his roles in The New Dick Van Dyke Show (1971–1974), Diagnosis: Murder (1993–2001), and Murder 101 (2006–2008).

== Performances ==
=== Film ===
Key
| † | Denotes films that have not yet been released |

| Year | Title | Role | Notes | Ref. |
|---|---|---|---|---|
| 1963 | Bye Bye Birdie | Albert F. Peterson | | |
| 1964 | What a Way to Go! | Edgar Hopper | | |
| 1964 | Mary Poppins | Bert / Mr. Dawes, Sr. | | |
| 1965 | The Art of Love | Paul Sloane / Toulouse, aka “Picasso” | | |
| 1966 | Lt. Robin Crusoe, U.S.N. | Lieutenant Robin Crusoe | | |
| 1967 | Divorce American Style | Richard Harmon | | |
| 1967 | Fitzwilly | Claude R. Fitzwilliam | | |
| 1968 | Never a Dull Moment | Jack Albany | | |
| 1968 | Chitty Chitty Bang Bang | Caractacus Potts | | |
| 1969 | Some Kind of a Nut | Fred Amidon | | |
| 1969 | The Comic | Billy Bright / Billy Bright, Jr. | | |
| 1971 | Cold Turkey | Reverend Clayton Brooks | | |
| 1975 | Tubby the Tuba | Tubby the Tuba | Voice | |
| 1978 | Read the Label, Set a Better Table | Himself | FDA Public service announcement | |
| 1979 | The Runner Stumbles | Father Brian Rivard | | |
| 1990 | Dick Tracy | District Attorney John Fletcher | | |
| 2001 | Walt: The Man Behind the Myth | Narrator | Voice, documentary | |
| 2005 | Batman: New Times | Commissioner Gordon | Voice, short | |
| 2006 | Curious George | Mr. Bloomsberry | Voice | |
| 2006 | Night at the Museum | Cecil J. Fredricks | | |
| 2009 | Night at the Museum: Battle of the Smithsonian | Cecil J. Fredricks | Deleted scene only | |
| 2014 | Alexander and the Terrible, Horrible, No Good, Very Bad Day | Himself | Cameo; Uncredited | |
| 2014 | Night at the Museum: Secret of the Tomb | Cecil J. Fredricks | | |
| 2015 | Merry Xmas | Father | Short film | |
| 2016 | Trolland | Yusop | Voice | |
| 2017 | If You're Not in the Obit, Eat Breakfast | Himself | Documentary | |
| 2017 | Gilbert | Himself | Documentary | |
| 2018 | The Great Buster: A Celebration | Himself | Documentary | |
| 2018 | Mary Poppins Returns | Mr. Dawes, Jr. | Cameo | |
| 2018 | Buttons: A Christmas Tale | Angel | | |

=== Television ===
| Year | Title | Role | Notes | Ref. |
|---|---|---|---|---|
| 1955–1956 | The Morning Show | Host | CBS | |
| 1956 | CBS Cartoon Theatre | Host | 13 episodes | |
| 1956–1957 | To Tell the Truth | Panelist | 5 episodes | |
| 1957–1958 | The Phil Silvers Show | Private Lumpkin / Private "Swifty" Bilko | 2 episodes | |
| 1958 | The Chevy Showroom Starring Andy Williams | Himself | | |
| 1958–1959 | Mother's Day | Host | | |
| 1959 | Laugh Line | Host | | |
| 1960 | Alfred Hitchcock Presents | Thomas Craig | Season 5 Episode 23: “Craig’s Will” | |
| 1960 | New Comedy Showcase | Richard Alexander | Season 1 Episode 4: “The Trouble with Richard” | |
| 1960 | No Place Like Home | Himself | Television special (with Carol Burnett, Rosemary Clooney, and José Ferrer) | |
| 1961–1966 | The Dick Van Dyke Show | Rob Petrie | 158 episodes | |
| 1969 | Dick Van Dyke and the Other Woman | Himself | Television special (with Mary Tyler Moore) | |
| 1970 | Dick Van Dyke Meets Bill Cosby | Himself | Television special (with Bill Cosby) | |
| 1971–1974 | The New Dick Van Dyke Show | Dick Preston | 72 episodes | |
| 1973 | The New Scooby-Doo Movies | Himself | Voice, episode: "The Haunted Carnival" | |
| 1974 | Julie and Dick at Covent Garden | Himself | ABC Television special (with Julie Andrews) | |
| 1974 | Columbo | Paul Galesko | Episode: "Negative Reaction" | |
| 1974 | The Morning After | Charlie Lester | Television film | |
| 1976 | Van Dyke and Company | Himself | Variety series; 11 episodes | |
| 1976 | Lola! | Cast member | Series | |
| 1977 | The Carol Burnett Show | Cast member | 11 episodes | |
| 1979 | Supertrain | Waldo Chase | Episode: "And a Cup of Kindness Too" | |
| 1981 | True Life Stories | Charlie | Documentary | |
| 1981 | Harry's Battles | Harry Fitzsimmons | Unsold half-hour pilot | |
| 1981 | How to Eat Like a Child | Himself | Television special | |
| 1982 | The Country Girl | Frank Elgin | Television film | |
| 1982 | Drop-Out Father | Ed McCall | Television film | |
| 1983 | CBS Library | Father | Voice, episode: "Wrong Way Kid" | |
| 1983 | Found Money | Max Sheppard | Television film | |
| 1984 | Donald Duck's 50th Birthday | Himself / Host | Television special | |
| 1985 | American Playhouse | Les Dischinger | Episode: "Breakfast with Les and Bess" | |
| 1986 | Strong Medicine | Sam Hawthorne | Television film | |
| 1986 | Matlock | Judge Carter Addison | Episode: "The Judge" | |
| 1987 | Ghost of a Chance | Bill Nolan | Television film | |
| 1987 | Highway to Heaven | Wally Dunn | Episode: "Wally" | |
| 1987 | Airwolf | Malduke | Episode: "Malduke" | |
| 1988 | The Van Dyke Show | Dick Burgess | 10 episodes | |
| 1989 | The Golden Girls | Ken | Episode: "Love Under the Big Top" | |
| 1990 | Matlock | Judge Carter Addison | Episode: "The Kidnapper" (stock footage from episode "The Judge") | |
| 1991 | Daughters of Privilege | Buddy Keys | Television film | |
| 1991 | Jake and the Fatman | Dr. Mark Sloan | Episode: "It Never Entered My Mind" (Backdoor pilot for Diagnosis: Murder) | |
| 1992 | Diagnosis of Murder | Dr. Mark Sloan | Diagnosis: Murder film | |
| 1992 | The House on Sycamore Street | Dr. Mark Sloan | Diagnosis: Murder film | |
| 1993 | The Town Santa Forgot | Narrator / Old Jeremy Creek | Voice, television film | |
| 1993 | A Twist of the Knife | Dr. Mark Sloan | Diagnosis: Murder film | |
| 1993–2001 | Diagnosis: Murder | Dr. Mark Sloan | Lead role (178 episodes); also executive producer (137 episodes) | |
| 1993 | Coach | Luthor Van Dam's Cousin (uncredited) | Episode: "Christmas of the Van Damned" | |
| 1999 | Becker | Fred Becker | Episode: "Becker the Elder" (episode 13) | |
| 2000 | Sabrina the Teenage Witch | Duke | Episode: "Welcome Back, Duke" | |
| 2002 | A Town Without Pity | Dr. Mark Sloan | Diagnosis: Murder film | |
| 2002 | Without Warning | Dr. Mark Sloan | Diagnosis: Murder film | |
| 2003 | The Gin Game | Weller Martin | Television film | |
| 2003 | The Alan Brady Show | Webb | Voice, Television special | |
| 2003 | Scrubs | Dr. Townshend | Episode: "My Brother, My Keeper" | |
| 2004 | The Dick Van Dyke Show Revisited | Rob Petrie | Television special | |
| 2006 | Murder 101 | Dr. Jonathan Maxwell | Television film | |
| 2007 | Murder 101: If Wishes Were Horses | Dr. Jonathan Maxwell | Television film | |
| 2007 | Murder 101: College Can Be Murder | Dr. Jonathan Maxwell | Television film | |
| 2008 | Murder 101: The Locked Room Mystery | Dr. Jonathan Maxwell | Television film | |
| 2011 | Hollywood Treasure | Himself | Episode: "Chitty Chitty Bid Bid" | |
| 2012 | The Doctors | Himself | Talk show | |
| 2012 | Fun with Dick and Jerry Van Dyke | Himself | Television film | |
| 2013 | Brody Stevens: Enjoy It! | Himself | Episode: "Born in the Valley; Hollywood Finale" | |
| 2014 | Signed, Sealed, Delivered | Kenneth Brandt | 2 episodes | |
| 2014 | Mickey Mouse Clubhouse | Captain Goof-Beard | Voice, episode: "Mickey's Pirate Adventure" | |
| 2015 | The Middle | Dutch Spence | Episode: "Two of a Kind" | |
| 2020 | Kidding | Hopscotch the Sasquatch | Voice, 2 episodes | |
| 2023–2024 | The Masked Singer | The Gnome / Himself | 2 episodes | |
| 2023 | Days of Our Lives | Timothy Robicheaux | 4 episodes | |
| 2023 | The Simpsons | Himself / Caractacus Potts | Voice, episode: "McMansion & Wife" | |
| 2023 | Dick Van Dyke 98 Years of Magic | Himself | Air date: 12/21/2023 Paramount CBS Entertainment 2-hour Special | |
| 2024 | Jimmy Kimmel Live! | Himself | Air date: 12/5/2024 | |

=== Music video ===
| Year | Song | Artist | Role | Ref. |
|---|---|---|---|---|
| 2024 | "All My Love" | Coldplay | Himself | |

=== Stage ===
| Year | Title | Role | Venue |
|---|---|---|---|
| November 2–14, 1959 | The Girls Against the Boys | Counselor/Jock/ Groom/He | Alvin Theatre, Broadway |
| April 14–October 22, 1960 | Bye Bye Birdie | Albert Peterson | Martin Beck Theatre, Broadway |
| October 24, 1960 – January 14, 1961 | Bye Bye Birdie | Albert Peterson | 54th Street Theatre, Broadway |
| April 12–May 15, 1977 | Same Time, Next Year | George | Doolittle Theatre, Hollywood |
| October 18–December 9, 1979 | The Music Man | Harold Hill | Sahara Theatre, Reno, Nevada |
| December 27, 1979 – March 16, 1980 | The Music Man | Harold Hill | Pantages Theatre, Hollywood |
| March 20–May 4, 1980 | The Music Man | Harold Hill | Golden Gate Theatre, San Francisco |
| May 6–11, 1980 | The Music Man | Harold Hill | Orpheum Theatre, Minneapolis |
| May 14–25, 1980 | The Music Man | Harold Hill | Arie Crown Theater, Chicago |
| May 29–June 22, 1980 | The Music Man | Harold Hill | City Center, Off-Broadway |
| January 24–26, 2006 | Chita Rivera: The Dancer's Life | Guest Star | Gerald Schoenfeld Theatre, Broadway |

== Albums ==
- Bye Bye Birdie (original cast album) (1960)
- Bye Bye Birdie (soundtrack) (1963)
- Mary Poppins (soundtrack) (1964)
- Songs I Like by Dick Van Dyke (with Enoch Light & his Orchestra/Ray Charles Singers) (1963)
- Chitty Chitty Bang Bang (soundtrack) (1968)
- Put on a Happy Face (with Dick Van Dyke and The Vantastix) (2008)
- Rhythm Train (with Leslie Bixler and Chad Smith) (2010)
- Step (Back) in Time BixMix Records (2017)
- We're Going Caroling (with Jane Lynch) KitschTone Records (2017)
