= Smile (The Idea of North album) =

Studio album by The Idea of North
- Released: 12 August 2013
- Studio: James Morrison Studios
- Length: 55:47
- Label: ABC Jazz
- Producer: Nick Begbie, The Idea of North

The Idea of North chronology
This Christmas (2012)	Smile (2013)	Anthology (2014)

Smile is the ninth studio album by Australian vocal ensemble, The Idea of North. The album was released on 12 August 2013 and peaked at number 86 on the ARIA Charts.

At the ARIA Music Awards of 2013, the album won the ARIA Award for Best Jazz Album.

== Track listing ==
1. "Windmills of Your Mind" (Michel Legrand, Alan and Marilyn Bergman) - 4:48
2. "Knocks Me Off My Feet" (Stevie Wonder) - 3:31
3. "Smile" - (Charlie Chaplin, John Turner, Geoffrey Parsons) - 4:34
4. "Fragile" - (Sting) - 6:21
5. "Big Yellow Taxi" (Joni Mitchell) - 4:02
6. "I Think It's Going to Rain Today" (Randy Newman) - 2:54
7. "Mas que Nada" (Jorge Ben) - 4:34
8. "Dindi" - (Antônio Carlos Jobim) - 4:05
9. "Meet Me in the Middle of the Air" (trad.) - 3:50
10. "Rachel" (Trish Delaney-Brown) - 2:51
11. "Keep My Supper Warm" (Andrew Piper) - 3:34
12. "When I Was a Girl" / "Secret Love" (Naomi Crellin, Paul Francis Webster, Sammy Fain) - 4:22
13. "Marie" (Randy Newman) - 3:11
14. "St. Thomas" (Sonny Rollins) - 3:10
15. "Mein Hut, Der Hat Drei Ecken" (trad.) - 1:22 (bonus track)

== Charts ==
=== Weekly charts ===
Chart (2013/14)	Peak position
Australian Albums (ARIA)	86
Australian Jazz & Blues Albums (ARIA)	2

=== Year-end charts ===
Chart (2013)	Position
Australian Jazz & Blues Albums (ARIA)	14
Chart (2014)	Position
Australian Jazz & Blues Albums (ARIA)	47
