= Wesley Carroll =

Wesley Carroll may refer to:

- Wesley Carroll (quarterback)
- Wesley Carroll (wide receiver)
- Wes Carroll (born 1970), American beatboxer
- Wes Carroll (baseball) (born 1979), American college coach
