= The Idea of North =

Australian a cappella ensemble

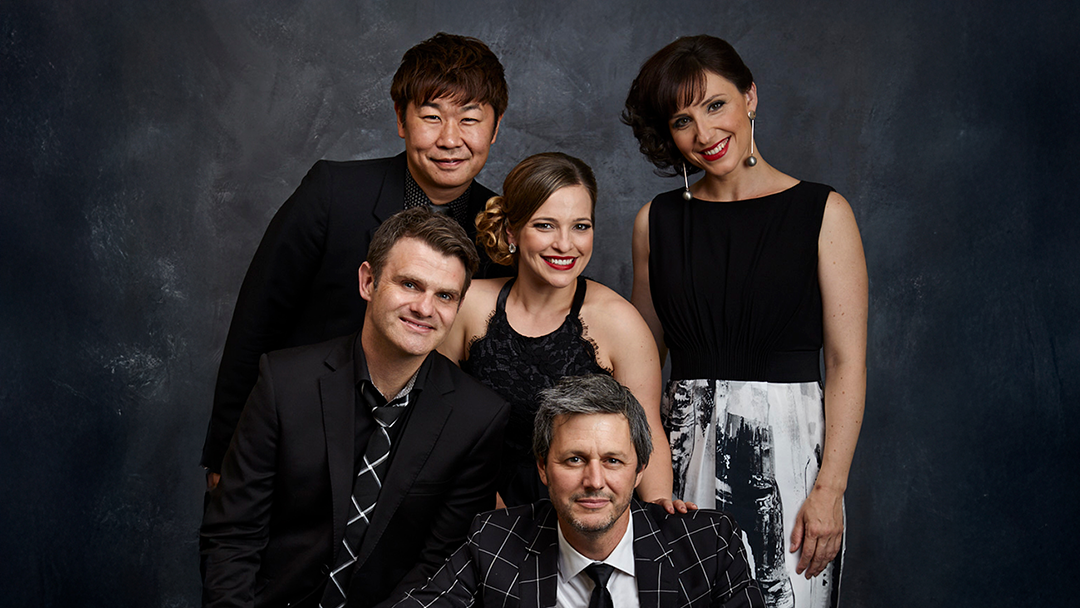
- Luke Thompson, Kaichiro Kitamura, Emma Rule, Nick Begbie, Naomi Crellin

Background information
- Origin: Canberra, Australian Capital Territory, Australia
- Genre: Jazz
- Years active: 1993–present
- Labels: Magnetic; ABC Jazz/Universal
- Members: Nick Begbie; Naomi Crellin; Luke Thompson; Emma Rule; Kai Kitamura
- Past members: Trish Delaney-Brown; Andrew Piper; Megan Corson; Sally Cameron; Joy Hague; Jo Lawry
- Website: idea.com.au

The Idea of North are an Australian a cappella vocal ensemble founded in Canberra in 1993, by Nick Begbie (tenor), Meg Corson (alto), Trish Delaney-Brown (soprano) and Andrew Piper (bass). Still active in 2025, but touring less frequently since the COVID-19 pandemic, The Idea of North has had a number of personnel changes since their formation, with Nick Begbie the only remaining original member.

The group is the only a cappella outfit ever to have won two ARIAs (Australian Recording Industry Association awards), both in the Best Jazz Album category at the ARIA Music Awards of 2010 for Feels Like Spring (collaboration with James Morrison) and again in 2013 for Smile, as well as three other ARIA nominations.

== History ==
=== 1993–1999: formation and debut album ===
The Idea of North was formed in Canberra 1993 by Nick Begbie (tenor), Meg Corson (alto), Trish Delaney-Brown (soprano) and Andrew Piper (bass). Three of the members were students at the Canberra School of Music (CSM) of Australian National University (ANU), while Nick was studying a non-music degree at the ANU but singing with the other three extra-curricularly in the CSM's vocal jazz ensemble, led by performer and jazz vocal educator Gery Scott. These four formed their own quartet from the larger ensemble, eventually adopting their name from The Idea of North (1967), a radio documentary by Canadian classical pianist Glenn Gould. The group is generally described as a jazz quartet, but they also delve regularly into the pop, R&B, classical, folk, soul and gospel genres. Over the years, the individual members of the group have written, arranged and performed some original music, but largely tackle re-imaginings of jazz standards and other music by a huge variety of artists, including The Beatles, Tim Minchin, Sting, Stevie Wonder, James Taylor, The Muppets, Joni Mitchell, Randy Newman, ABBA, the Bee Gees, Vulfpeck and John Mayer.

In 1997 they recorded their debut album, The Idea of North, with Ra Khan in the recording booth at the CSM recording studios. The group members arranged cover versions of jazz standards, gospel music, traditional songs and more contemporary material. Instrumentation was provided by Greg Stott on congas and percussion, Duncan Brown on bass and Piper on flugelhorn on "My Funny Valentine", although the album was majority a cappella.

=== 2000–2005: The Sum of Us, Here & Now and Evidence ===
The Idea of North's second album, The Sum of Us, was released in October 2001. Its track "Mas Que Nada" features Morrison on trombone, and "Fragile" showcases Don Burrows on flute. Delaney-Brown wrote two tracks, "Neat Surprise" and "Gotta Move On", while "Singin' a Cappella" was co-written by Begbie and Piper and "Two Sides to the Story" was written by Piper. It was co-produced by the group's members and recorded by David Hemming at Tiger Studios, Sydney for Magnetic Records. It reached No. 15 on the ARIA Jazz & Blues Albums chart.

In March 2002 Corson was replaced as alto in the group by Naomi Crellin (ex-Pure Harmony and ex-Jelelah), an Adelaide Girl's Choir alumna and a graduate from University of Adelaide's Elder Conservatorium. Crellin's previous group, Pure Harmony, was an a cappella quartet formed in 1992 at Marryatville High School, Adelaide with fellow students Sally Cameron, Joy Hague and Kate Boumelha.

The Idea of North's third album, Here & Now, was released in October 2003 via ABC Jazz, which contained re-recordings of their previous material plus two new tracks. Recorded by the line-up of Begbie, Crellin, Delaney-Brown and Piper at Australian Broadcasting Corporation's studio 227, Sydney, it reached No. 13 on the ARIA Hitseekers Albums Chart and No. 8 on the ARIA Jazz & Blues Albums chart.

San Francisco-based Contemporary A Cappella Society present the Contemporary A Cappella Recording Awards. In 2004 the Idea of North were runners-up for Artist of the Year.

In May 2004, The Idea of North released Evidence, featuring original songs from Delaney-Brown and arrangements by Crellin, Delaney-Brown, Morrison and Piper, as well as guest appearances by Morrison and Melbourne-based Australian drummer David Jones. The group also recorded and included on Evidence an arrangement of Horace Silver's "Sister Sadie", written especially for them by longtime fan and renowned Swedish-Australian musicologist and music theorist Bengt-Olov Palmqvist. Evidence peaked at No. 12 on the ARIA Jazz & Blues Albums chart. At the 2005 Contemporary A Cappella Recording Awards they won best jazz album and best jazz song for "Rachel".

=== 2006–2009: The Gospel Project and Live at the Powerhouse ===
In April 2006, The Idea of North released The Gospel Project, and featured prayers and three tracks, "Let It Ring", "Help Us" and "The Truth" co-written by Begbie and Michael Leunig. Aside from vocals by Begbie, Crellin, Delaney-Brown and Piper, four of the recordings included instruments: Duncan Brown on bass guitar, Bill Risby on keyboards and Gordon Rytmeister on drums. During 2006 they had appeared at festivals in Germany, Japan, Malaysia and South Korea. In October they toured Australia to promote the album with the Gospel Project Band.

On 2 July 2007 they issued their first live album, Live at the Powerhouse, both on CD and as a DVD. Barry O'Sullivan of All About Jazz described how the "a capella [sic] vocal ensemble just swings and swings with impeccable harmonies and an understanding of each others' [sic] vocal parts. The breadth of the group's performance is its most remarkable characteristic, never stopping in offering something new with tracks." The album was recorded at the Brisbane Powerhouse on 4 June 2006 with the DVD directed and edited by Adam Sébire, while the audio was recorded by David Hemming and produced by the group.

Sally Cameron (ex-Pure Harmony, South Australian Police Band) joined as soprano in February 2007 to replace Delaney-Brown, who left to start her family. The group farewelled Delaney-Brown, formally, in a one-off concert at The Basement, Sydney in June 2008. She later became a member of Sonic Mayhem Orchestra and then James Valentine Quartet before establishing the Trish Delaney-Brown Quintet, and then in 2021 debuting with her new female vocal trio, Lhyra.

=== 2010–2011: Feels Like Spring and Extraordinary Tale ===
On 10 April 2010, the group released their sixth studio album, Feels Like Spring which, another collaboration with Australian jazz icon James Morrison, peaked at No. 3 on the ARIA Jazz & Blues Albums chart and spent 33 weeks (non-consecutive) in the top 20 until February 2011. In the studio, non-vocal instrumentation was supplied by Ian Cooper on strings; Sandro Constatino on viola; Alexandra D'ella on violin; Phillip Hartl on violin; Morrison on double bass, flugelhorn, horn arrangements, piano, saxophone, trombone and trumpet; James Muller on guitar; Gordon Rytmeister on drums; Sunil de Silva on percussion; Adrian Wallis on cello; Duncan Brown on electric bass; and Jonathan Zwartz on double bass. It was recorded at James Morrison Studios and co-produced by the group and Morrison.

At the ARIA Music Awards of 2010 Idea of North and James Morrison won the ARIA Award for Best Jazz Album for Feels Like Spring.

In July 2011, the group released Extraordinary Tale. At the ARIA Music Awards of 2011 the recording was nominated for Best Jazz Album. For this entirely a cappella recording Begbie, Cameron, Crellin and Piper provided their usual four part harmony with Piper adding some vocal percussion. Extraordinary Tale peaked at No. 1 on the ARIA Jazz & Blues Albums, No. 5 on the Hitseekers Albums and No. 93 on the Top 100 Physical Albums charts. Also in late 2011 Crellin took maternity leave, her alto role covered by Joy Hague (ex-Pure Harmony) with Crellin returning in early 2012. Hague resumed her work as a high school music teacher although she filled in as deputy alto in the Idea of North as required thereafter.

=== 2012–2014: This Christmas and Smile ===
The quartet recorded their eighth studio album, This Christmas, which was released on 29 October 2012. The album includes Morrison guesting on trombone on two tracks and Hague as alto on three tracks. It was rumoured to have been recorded in several locations, including the James Morrison Studios in Warriewood, Sydney, the home studio of Sydney drummer Gordon Rytmeister (who also appears on the album), and a friend's single-car garage. The album peaked at No. 80 on the ARIA Albums, No. 2 on the Hitseekers Albums and No. 2 on the Jazz & Blues Albums charts.

The quartet's ninth studio album, Smile, was released on 12 August 2013 which peaked at No. 86 on the ARIA Albums, No. 4 on the Hitseekers Albums and No. 2 on the Jazz & Blues Albums charts.

At the ARIA Music Awards of 2013 the Idea of North won the ARIA Award for Best Jazz Album for a second time with Smile.

In November 2014, the Idea of North released a compilation album, Anthology, which peaked at No. 5 on the Jazz & Blues Albums charts.

=== 2015–2019: Ballads, Hush 16, A World of Christmas and Brick By Brick ===
In 2015, due to some vocal health issues, a replacement tenor was sourced to cover Nick's part for The Idea of North's 2015 Australian Christmas Tour. Ed Fairlie, a jazz trumpeter, singer and educator from Melbourne, auditioned and was taken on for the tour. However, because the adverse effects of Nick's health issues only affected his upper register, Naomi rearranged the tour repertoire to include a new baritone part that Nick learnt alongside Ed's inclusion, and it became the first five-part (quintet) tour The Idea of North had ever undertaken.

From 2016, Japanese vocal percussionist Kaichiro Kitamura was a session and touring member and featured on three tracks on their tenth studio album, Ballads, which was released on 18 April 2016. The album was a collaborative affair, not only with Kai's involvement, but Ed Fairlie also arranged a song ("My One and Only Love") for Ballads and sang with the group on the recording of that song. Ballads has a fifth quintet track in a song featuring Australia jazz vocalist Kristin Berardi on a Naomi Crellin-arranged track that Kristin wrote called 'Ode to Ollie'. The album reached No. 3 on the Hitseekers Albums and No. 2 on the Jazz & Blues Albums charts.

Several years prior to 2016, The Hush Foundation (a Melbourne health-care charity) had asked The Idea of North to record an album of original music for the HUSH program – but the group had been too busy. It was suggested that the album go ahead, but with collaborators. HUSH 16: A Piece Of Quiet was born, through collaborations between The Idea of North, Israeli-Australian singer-songwriter Lior and Australian composer and pianist Elena Kats-Chernin. The tracks on the album were based on conversations with kids – about their views of the world, family life, school life, illness, health and well-being – and the kids' stories and views were used as a basis for the lyrics and themes on many of the album's tracks. It was The Idea of North's first kids' album, and was nominated for 'Best Children's Album' at the 2017 ARIA Awards.

2016 was a busy year for The Idea of North, who were also approached by longtime collaborator and label ABC Music in 2016 and asked to record a Christmas Album with the Melbourne Symphony Orchestra for the ABC Classics label (A World of Christmas). The songs were almost all arranged by Naomi Crellin and much of the orchestration was by Australian composer and orchestrator Joseph Twist. The album was recorded live in Melbourne in late 2016, and with his specialty in jazz percussion, Kaichiro Kitamura was the official drummer (vocally) in the included jazz rhythm section. Andrew Piper was transitioning away from the group at this stage and the bass part on this performance (and album) was performed by Ed Fairlie, a Melbourne jazz vocalist, trumpeter and educator.

In February 2017, Cameron and Piper both formally left the group; Piper was replaced on bass by Adelaide jazz vocalist, saxophonist and educator Luke Thompson, while Cameron's temporary replacements were Delaney-Brown and Jo Lawry prior to Emma Rule becoming the group's new permanent soprano in September 2017. Kaichiro Kitamura became a permanent member of the group in May 2017, and for the first time in its history, The Idea of North was officially a quintet.

In November 2018, the group self-recorded and self-released its 14th and first fully five-part album Brick By Brick, with the same lineup that has persisted since then: Nick Begbie, Naomi Crellin, Kaichiro Kitamura, Emma Rule and Luke Thompson.

=== 2020–2023: the COVID-19 pandemic ===
Before the COVID-19 pandemic set in worldwide, The Idea of North played their last show to a full house at the Adelaide Fringe Festival, Australia. Due to the increasing concern over the pandemic, growing rates of infection and escalating frequency of lockdowns, The Idea of North went on hiatus. With members living in three different states of Australia and one member in Japan, rehearsing became unviable, and the pandemic saw live presentation of the arts in Australia grind to a halt. For periods throughout 2020 to 2022, singing in groups was deemed illegal (in Australia), so the viability of working as a singing group was severely diminished. In 2023, following a significant decrease in infections worldwide, as well as the post-pandemic re-opening of Japan in Oct 2022, The Idea of North re-formed to begin touring again.

=== 2023–present: Live, Actually ===
With no guarantee their 2023 tour would be a re-boot of the group's touring career, The Idea of North recorded every performance of this tour, both for posterity and because the only other live recording produced by the group had been in 2007. The album 'Live, Actually' was then produced by Begbie & Crellin and released in late 2024 to fans on that tour.

The 2023 tour was such a great success it inspired The Idea of North to continue performing indefinitely, albeit more sporadically. Since this tour, they have committed to one tour of Australian capital cities each year, and some smaller tours appearances from time to time.

== Members ==
=== Current ===
- Tenor: Nick Begbie (1993–present)
- Alto: Naomi Crellin (2002–present)
- Soprano: Emma Rule (2018–present)
- Bass: Luke Thompson (2017–present)
- Baritone and vocal percussion: Kaichiro Kitamura (2017–present)
- Sound engineer: Grant Whitehead (2016–present)

=== Touring, studio and session ===
- Tenor: Ed Fairlie (2015–2016)
- Vocal percussion: Kaichiro Kitamura (2016)
- Live sound: David O'Rourke (1994–2007), Tod Deeley (2007–2016), Michael Honey (casual 2018–present), Kath Burrows (casual 2015–present), Grant Whitehead (2016–present)
- Studio sound: Ra Khan (1996), David Hemming (2001–2007), Tod Deeley (2007–2016), Kath Burrows (2017–2019), Grant Whitehead (2016–present)

=== Former ===
- Alto: Meg Corson (1993–2002)
- Bass: Andrew Piper (1993–2017)
- Alto: Joy Hague (2011 & 2014 - maternity leave replacement for Crellin)
- Soprano: Sally Cameron (2007–2017), Trish Delaney-Brown (1993–2007, 2017), Jo Lawry (2017)

== Discography ==
=== Studio albums ===
| Title | Details | Peak chart positions | |
| Title | Details | AUS | AUS Jazz and Blues |
|---|---|---|---|
| The Idea of North | Released: 1997; Label: The Idea of North (97007-2); Format: CD | - | - |
| The Sum of Us | Released: October 2001; Label: Magnetic Records (934002-2); Format: CD | - | 15 |
| Here & Now | Released: 20 October 2003; Label: ABC Jazz/Universal Music Australia (9810913); Format: CD | - | 8 |
| Evidence | Released: 17 May 2004; Label: ABC Jazz/Universal Music Australia (9818674); Format: CD | - | 12 |
| The Gospel Project | Released: April 2006; Label: Magnetic Records (934128-4); Format: CD | - | - |
| Feels Like Spring (with James Morrison) | Released: 10 April 2010; Label: ABC Jazz/Universal Music Australia (2735660); Format: CD, DD | - | 3 |
| Extraordinary Tale | Released: 29 July 2011; Label: ABC Jazz/Universal Music Australia (4764524); Format: CD, DD | - | 1 |
| This Christmas | Released: 29 October 2012; Label: ABC Jazz/Universal Music Australia (4765169); Format: CD, DD | 80 | 2 |
| Smile | Released: 12 August 2013; Label: ABC Jazz/Universal Music Australia (4810503); Format: CD, DD | 86 | 2 |
| Ballads | Released: 18 April 2016; Label: ABC Jazz/Universal Music Australia (4782693); Format: CD, DD | - | 2 |
| Brick By Brick | Released: 28 November 2018; Label: The Idea of North; Format: CD, DD | - | - |

=== Live albums ===
| Title | Details | Peak chart positions |
| Title | Details | AUS Jazz and Blues |
|---|---|---|
| Live at the Powerhouse | Released: 2 July 2007; Label: ABC Jazz (4766153 / 0762710); Format: CD+DVD, digital download; Recorded: Brisbane Powerhouse on 4 June 2006. | |
| A World of Christmas (with Melbourne Symphony Orchestra) | Released: 10 November 2017; Label: ABC Jazz (4816474); Format: CD, digital download, streaming; Recorded: Hamer Hall, Melbourne, in 2016. | |

=== As featured albums ===
| Title | Details | Peak chart positions |
| Title | Details | AUS Jazz and Blues |
|---|---|---|
| The Gospel According to Groove (James Morrison, Con Campbell & The Idea of North) | Released: 2001; Label: Emu Music (EMU8JA-2); Format: CD, digital download; Note: Contributed two songs to the album | |
| Hush Volume 16: A Piece of Quiet (with Elena Kats-Chernin & Lior) | Released: 7 October 2016; Label: ABC Music (4814581); Format: CD, digital download; Note: Contributed eight songs to the album | |

=== Compilation albums ===
| Title | Details | Peak chart positions |
| Title | Details | AUS Jazz and Blues |
|---|---|---|
| Anthology | Released: 17 November 2014; Label: ABC Jazz/Universal Music Australia (4704196); Format: CD, digital download | 5 |

== Awards and nominations ==
=== ARIA Awards ===
The ARIA Music Awards are presented annually since 1987 by the Australian Recording Industry Association (ARIA). The Idea of North has won one award from four nominations.

| Year | Nominee / work | Award | Result Ref. |
|---|---|---|---|
| 2010 | Feels Like Spring (with James Morrison) | Best Jazz Album | Won |
| 2011 | Extraordinary Tale | Best Jazz Album | Nominated |
| 2013 | Smile | Best Jazz Album | Won |
| 2016 | Ballads | Best Jazz Album | Nominated |
| 2017 | A Piece of Quiet (The Hush Collection, Vol. 16) (with Lior and Elena Kats-Chernin) | Best Children's Album | Nominated |

=== CARA Awards ===
Since 1992, the annual Contemporary A Cappella Recording Awards (CARAs) recognise the best recorded a cappella.

| Year | Nominee / work | Award | Result |
|---|---|---|---|
| 2005 | Evidence | Best Jazz Album | Won |
| 2005 | "Rachel" | Best Jazz Song | Won |
| 2010 | The Idea of North | Favourite Oceanic Group | Won |
| 2011 | The Idea of North | Favourite Oceanic Group | Won |
| 2013 | The Idea of North | Favourite Oceanic Group | Won |

- Note:wins only
