= Feels Like Spring =

Studio album by James Morrison and The Idea of North
- Released: April 2010
- Recorded: 2009
- Studio: James Morrison Studios, Sydney
- Length: 51:20
- Label: ABC Jazz
- Producer: Martin Buzacott

James Morrison chronology
Three's Company (2010)	Feels Like Spring (2010)	Snappy Too (2012)

The Idea of North chronology
Live at the Powerhouse (2007)	Feels Like Spring (2010)	Extraordinary Tale (2011)

Feels Like Spring is a collaborative studio album by Australian recording artists James Morrison and The Idea of North. The album was released in April 2010.

At the ARIA Music Awards of 2010, the album won the ARIA Award for Best Jazz Album.

== Track listing ==
1. "Dear John" (Andrew Piper) - 3:11
2. "The Nearness of You" (Hoagy Carmichael, Ned Washington)- 3:50
3. "It Might As Well Be Spring" (Oscar Hammerstein II, Richard Rodgers)- 3:43
4. "Over the Rainbow" (Harold Arlen, Yip Harburg)- 5:53
5. "Le Belleclaire Blues" (James Morrison) - 4:14
6. "Bella Tina" (Andrew Piper) - 4:16
7. "Smile" (Charlie Chaplin, Geoffrey Parsons, John Turner) - 4:28
8. "If I Were a Bell" (Frank Loesser) - 3:20
9. "Stella by Starlight" (Nick Begbie, Ned Washington, Victor Young)- 5:11
10. "Since I Fell for You" (Buddy Johnson) - 5:20
11. "Enchanted" (James Morrison) - 3:33
12. "What a Fool Believes" (Kenny Loggins, Michael McDonald) - 3:46

== Charts ==
=== Weekly charts ===
Chart (2010/11)	Position
Australian Jazz & Blues Albums (ARIA)	3

=== Year-end charts ===
Chart (2010)	Position
Australian Jazz & Blues Albums (ARIA)	15
