= James Morrison (jazz musician) =

Australian jazz musician (born 1962)

James Morrison AM
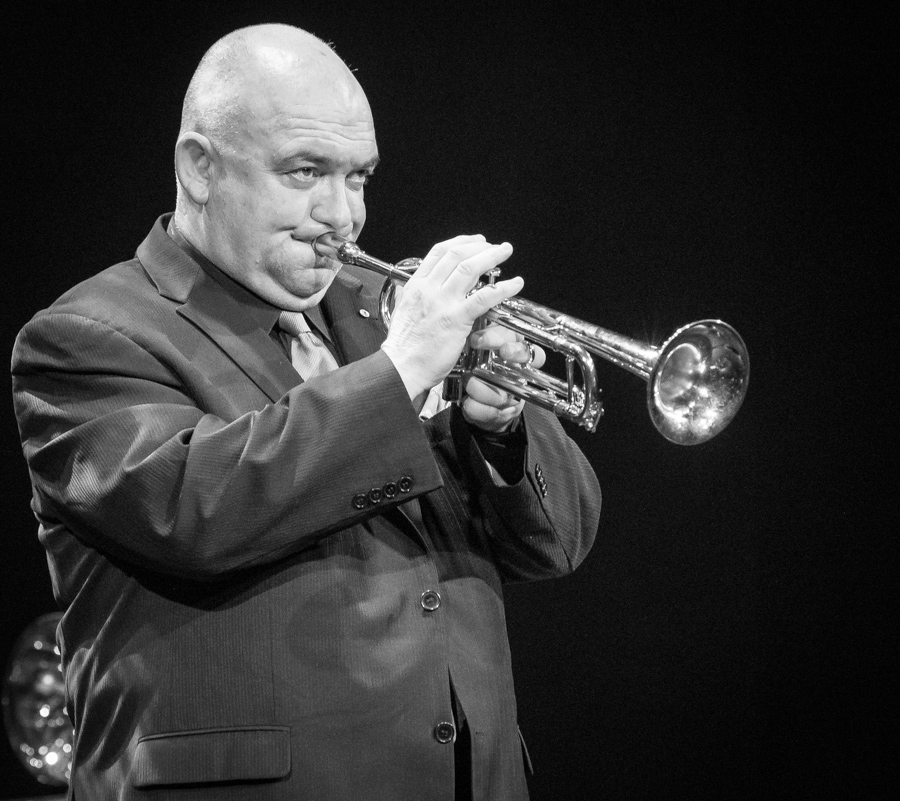
- Morrison performs at the Oslo Jazz Festival in 2017.

Background information
- Born: James Lloyd Morrison; 11 November 1962 (age 63); Boorowa, New South Wales, Australia
- Genres: Jazz
- Occupations: Musician; songwriter; jazz educator; artistic director; TV presenter
- Instruments: Trumpet; saxophone; trombone; tuba; euphonium; piano; flugelhorn; clarinet; double bass; guitar
- Years active: 1983–present
- Labels: ABC, WEA, EastWest, Fanfare
- Spouse: Judi Green (m. 1988)
- Website: jamesmorrison.com

James Lloyd Morrison AM (born 11 November 1962) is an Australian jazz musician. Although his main instrument is trumpet, he has also performed on trombone, tuba, euphonium, flugelhorn, saxophone, clarinet, double bass, guitar, and piano. He is a composer, writing jazz charts for ensembles of various sizes and proficiency levels.

He composed and performed the opening fanfare at the Sydney 2000 Olympic Games. In 2009, he joined Steve Pizzati and Warren Brown as a presenter on Top Gear Australia. At the ARIA Music Awards of 2010 Morrison and an a cappella group, The Idea of North, won Best Jazz Album, for their collaboration on Feels Like Spring. In 2012 Morrison was appointed Artistic Director of the Queensland Music Festival for the 2013 and 2015 festivals. He was inducted into the Graeme Bell Hall of Fame 2013 at the Australian Jazz Bell Awards. In July 2013 he conducted the World's Largest Orchestra in Brisbane's Suncorp Stadium, consisting of 7,224 musicians.

== Early life and education ==
James Lloyd Morrison was born on 11 November 1962 in Boorowa, a rural farming community, where his father, George Morrison, was a Methodist minister. Morrison comes from a musical family: his mother plays alto saxophone, piano, and organ; his sister is a trumpeter, and his older brother, John Morrison, is a jazz drummer. The family moved to various sites in New South Wales due to his father's ministry before settling in Pittwater. At the age of six, he started taking piano lessons and at seven, he took up playing brass instruments, practiced on his brother's cornet.

Morrison attended Mona Vale Primary School and Pittwater High School, then Sydney Conservatorium of Music where he completed a jazz course. At the conservatorium he met Don Burrows, who became his mentor. In 1981, Morrison was a faculty member at his alma mater.

== Music career ==
=== Morrison Brothers ===
In 1983 James and John Morrison formed the Morrison Brothers Big Bad Band, a 13-piece group. In 1984 the band included James Morrison on trumpet, trombone, and piano, Warwick Alder on trumpet, Peter Cross on trumpet, Paul Andrews on alto saxophone, Tom Baker on alto and baritone saxophones, Jason Morphett on tenor saxophone, Glenn Henrich on vibraphone, Craig Scott on bass, and John Morrison on drums. The band's debut album, A Night in Tunisia, was released in 1984 by ABC Records as part of the Don Burrows Collection. The title track is a jazz standard by Dizzy Gillespie; another track, "Burrows Bossa", was written by Morrison. Also that year he backed Burrows on Burrows at the Winery, playing trumpet, slide trumpet, trombone, and flugelhorn. The album was live at Rothbury Estate Winery. Morrison Brothers Big Bad Band used the same venue for their album Live at the Winery.

Morrison played the wrong Spanish national anthem at the Davis Cup final in Australia in 2003. Instead of playing the current anthem, Marcha Real, he performed the Himno de Riego, not heard since the Second Republic era (1931–1939), causing the Spanish Secretary of State for Sport to walk out in anger. Morrison later revealed he had mistakenly learned the incorrect tune due to being given the wrong sheet music. Fortunately an official quickly found a CD of the correct anthem, placating the Spanish and allowing the match to proceed.

=== Association with other musicians ===
Morrison has performed with Dizzy Gillespie (the first Australian to do so); Don Burrows, Ray Charles, and B.B. King. He has also worked with George Benson, Ray Brown, Cab Calloway, Jon Faddis, Herbie Hancock, Whitney Houston, Quincy Jones, Graeme Lyall, Wynton Marsalis, Mark Nightingale, Red Rodney, Arturo Sandoval, Woody Shaw, Frank Sinatra, and Phil Stack.

In 1990, he recorded the album Snappy Doo with Ray Brown on double bass, Herb Ellis on guitar, Jeff Hamilton on drums, and Morrison on piano, trumpet, trombone (tenor and bass), saxophone (soprano, alto, tenor, and baritone), and bits of clarinet, flute, flugelhorn, and euphonium. He recorded a sequel, Snappy Too, in 2011 with Hamilton, but Brown and Ellis died in the interim, so Morrison played guitar and bass in addition to all of the other instruments from the first album.

In 1999, he collaborated with Gina Jeffreys and The Idea of North on the song "Blue Christmas", which is included on Jeffreys' album, Christmas Wish. In 2005, he was guest soloist at the 150th anniversary concert of the Black Dyke Band; and in 2009 performed with them as special guest during their Australian tour. In 2007, he again appeared as guest soloist at concerts with the band in Manchester and London. In 2003 he founded the band on the Edge together with the German keyboardist and composer Simon Stockhausen, son of Karlheinz Stockhausen. Morrison has a long association with composer and pianist Lalo Schifrin (composer of the theme from Mission: Impossible) and has recorded albums for Schifrin's "Jazz Meets the Symphony" series. These include recordings with the London and the Czech National symphony orchestras.

He found his lead vocalist, Emma Pask, at a school concert when she was 16, and she became an internationally renowned jazz singer. Morrison sponsors scholarships for musicians and is involved with youth bands. His association with Generations in Jazz has spanned three decades. He was chairman of this organization, which ran one of the largest youth jazz events in the world.

== Other activities ==
=== Radio and TV presenter ===
For a number of years, Morrison has been the presenter of the in-flight jazz radio station for Qantas Airways. In 1994, James presented Behind The Wheel, a motoring television series on Network Ten. Ten saw the benefits of a series like this and commissioned 18 episodes. It aired on a Tuesday night at 7.30pm to an audience of 2.1 million viewers. The pilot episode was produced by Tim Kupsch, Andy Wallace and James Morrison. Unlike Top Gear, the show ideas and script were largely conceived "on the fly" by Morrison and Kupsch.

On 19 December 2008, presenter Charlie Cox announced his departure from Top Gear Australia due to lack of time. Morrison replaced him in the second season alongside Warren Brown and Steve Pizzati. He appeared as the "Star in a Bog-Standard Car" in episode 6 of the first series.

On 18 September 2018, he started to present the Tuesday night specialist show Top Brass for BBC Radio 2, which was moved alongside Sunday Night Is Music Night for series 2 in 2020 and which continues to be broadcast in the United Kingdom at 9pm on a Sunday in 2022.

=== Instrument production ===
In early 2010 he formed an association with Austrian brass manufacturer Schagerl to produce "signature" models. These include two series – the custom, hand-made "Meister" series and the intermediate professional "Academica" series. There are trumpets and trombones in both series, and the Meister series includes flugelhorn and bass trumpet. His design of a trumpet called "The Raven" uses rotary valves with a long lead pipe usually associated with a piston trumpet. He has also designed an improved superbone, a hybrid trombone that has three valves as well as a slide.

An instrument project with designer and robotics expert Steve Marshall produced the Morrison Digital Trumpet, a MIDI wind controller that looks like a futuristic version of a typical trumpet. It allows a trumpeter to play electronic sounds in much the same way a pianist can play a synthesizer.

On his collaboration album The Other Woman with singer Deni Hines, he wrote a track called "(Tired of Being) The Other Woman". When Morrison performed this track at a performance in Sydney, he revealed his latest piece of music technology. It is a Roland keyboard (VP770) that has a microphone attached and 'sings' whatever Morrison speaks into the microphone, producing the sound of a choir.

=== James Morrison Academy of Music ===
In March 2015 Morrison opened the James Morrison Academy of Music in Mount Gambier, South Australia – a tertiary-level, dedicated jazz school offering a degree in jazz performance. Award-winning jazz drummer David Jones started lecturing at the academy in 2015.

The academy ceased operations in 2021, citing the COVID-19 pandemic as a major factor. As of September 2023 the program was undergoing restructuring, with an aim to bring short courses to regional areas in the near future.

=== Flying ===
Morrison is also a private pilot and the brand ambassador for Australian Air Safaris.

== Personal life ==
Morrison met Judi Green, the 1987 Miss Australia winner, at a barbecue before both participated in a celebrity race at the Adelaide Grand Prix. The couple married in 1988 and they have three sons.

== Awards and honours ==
On 9 June 1997 James Morrison was appointed a Member of the Order of Australia with a citation "for service to music, particularly jazz, and the sponsorship of young musicians".

=== AIR Awards ===
The Australian Independent Record Awards (commonly known informally as AIR Awards) is an annual awards night to recognise, promote and celebrate the success of Australia's Independent Music sector.

Year	Nominee / work	Award	Result
2017	In Good Company (with Don Burrows)	Best Independent Jazz Album	Won
2018	The Great American Songbook (with BBC Concert Orchestra)	Best Independent Jazz Album Album	Won
2019	Midnight Till Dawn Mildlife – Phase	Best Independent Jazz Album Album	Nominated

=== ARIA Music Awards ===
The ARIA Music Awards is an annual awards ceremony that recognises excellence, innovation, and achievement across all genres of Australian music. Morrison has won two awards from thirteen nominations.

Year	Nominee / work	Award	Result
1989	Postcards From Down Under	Best Jazz Album	Nominated
1990	Swiss Encounter (with Adam Makowicz)	Best Jazz Album	Nominated
1991	Snappy Doo	Best Jazz Album	Nominated
1992	Manner Dangerous	Best Jazz Album	Nominated
1993	To the Max (with Ray Brown)	Best Jazz Album	Nominated
2002	Scream Machine	Best Jazz Album	Nominated
2008	The Other Woman (with Deni Hines)	Best Jazz Album	Nominated
2010	Feels Like Spring (with The Idea of North)	Best Jazz Album	Won
2012	Snappy Too	Best Jazz Album	Nominated
2016	In Good Company (with Don Borrows)	Best Jazz Album	Nominated
2017	The Great American Songbook (with BBC Concert Orchestra, Keith Lockhart, Harry Morrison, William Morrison & Patrick Danao)	Best Jazz Album	Won
2017	James Morrison With His Academy Jazz Orchestra	Best Jazz Album	Nominated
2018	Ella and Louis (with Patti Austin, Melbourne Symphony Orchestra & Benjamin Northey)	Best Jazz Album	Nominated

=== APRA Music Awards ===
Year	Nominee / work	Award	Result
1990	"Saturday Sailing"	Most Performed Jazz Work	Won

=== Australian Jazz Bells ===
The Australian Jazz Bell Awards, also known as the Bell Awards or The Bells, are annual music awards for the jazz music genre in Australia.

Year	Nominee / work	Award	Result
2013	James Morrison	Graeme Bell Hall of Fame	inducted

=== Mo Awards ===
The Australian Entertainment Mo Awards (commonly known informally as the Mo Awards), were annual Australian entertainment industry awards. They recognise achievements in live entertainment in Australia from 1975 to 2016. James Morrison won ten awards in that time.

Year	Nominee / work	Award	Result (wins only)
1988	James Morrison	Ricky May Jazz Performer of the Year	Won
1989	James Morrison	Jazz Performer of the Year	Won
1989	James Morrison	Jazz Male Performer of the Year	Won
1989	James Morrison	Australian Performer of the Year	Won
1990	James Morrison	Jazz Performer of the Year	Won
1990	James Morrison	Jazz Male Performer of the Year	Won
1997	James Morrison	Jazz Instrumental Performer of the Year	Won
1999	James Morrison	Jazz Instrumental Performer of the Year	Won
2002	James Morrison	Jazz Instrumental Performer of the Year	Won
2006	James Morrison	Ricky May Jazz Performer of the Year	Won

== Discography ==
=== Albums ===
List of albums, with selected details and chart positions.
Title	Album details	Peak chart positions	Certifications
Title	Album details	AUS	Certifications
A Night in Tunisia	Released: 1984; Label: ABC (836375-1); Formats: LP	—	
James Morrison at the Winery	Released: 1985; Label: ABC (836374-1); Formats: LP	—	
Postcards from Down Under	Released: August 1988; Label: WEA (255697.1/255697.2); Formats: LP, CD	47	
Swiss Encounter (with Adam Makowicz)	Released: 1989; Label: WEA (256731.1/256731.2); Formats: LP, CD	—	
Snappy Doo	Released: July 1990; Label: WEA (903171211.1/903171211.2); Formats: LP, CD, cassette	17	ARIA: Gold
Manner Dangerous	Released: December 1991; Label: EastWest (903176023.2/903176023.4); Formats: CD, cassette	76	
Two the Max (with Ray Brown)	Released: 1992; Label: EastWest (903177125.2); Format: CD	—	
This Is Christmas	Released: 1993; Label: EastWest (450993863.2); Format: CD	91	
Live in Paris	Released: 1994; Label: EastWest (450999260.2); Format: CD	—	
Live at the Sydney Opera House	Released: June 1996; Label: Warner Music Australia (0630151462); Format: CD	71	
Quartet	Released: 1998; Label: Morrison (MR 001); Format: CD	—	
Three Minds	Released: November 1998; Label: Morrison (MR 003); Format: CD	86	
European Sessions	Released: 1999; Label: Morrison (MR 006); Format: CD	—	
Scream Machine	Released: 2001; Label: Morrison (MR 10); Format: CD	—	
The Gospel According to Groove (with Con Campbell & The Idea of North)	Released: 2001; Label: Emu Music (EMU8JA-2); Format: CD	—	
On the Edge	Released: 2003; Label: Morrison (MR 15); Formats: CD	—	
Gospel Collection	Released: 2005; Label: Morrison (MRG001); Format: CD	—	
2x2 (with Joe Chindamo)	Released: January 2006; Label: Morrison; Format: CD	—	
Gospel Collection Volume 2	Released: August 2006; Label: Morrison; Format: CD	—	
The Other Woman (with Deni Hines)	Released: 13 October 2007; Label: MGM Distribution (JMDH2); Formats: CD, digital download	86	
James Morrison Instrumental	Released: November 2009; Label: Classic Fox; Formats: CD, digital download	—	
Three's Company (with Phil Stack and James Muller)	Released: 2010; Label: Morrison; Formats: CD, digital download	—	
Feels Like Spring (with The Idea of North)	Released: April 2010; Label: ABC Jazz (2735660); Formats: CD, digital download	—	
Snappy Too	Released: September 2012; Label: Morrison (MR 20); Formats: CD, digital download	—	
A to Z of Jazz	Released: 2014; Label: ABC Jazz (4704193); Formats: 2×CD, digital download	—	
Chermoula	Released: 2015; Label: Morrison; Format: Digital download	—	
A Fine Bromance (with Marian Petrescu)	Released: July 2015; Label: Morrison; Format: Digital download	—	
In Good Company (with Don Burrows)	Released: 20 November 2015; Label: ABC; Format: Digital download	—	
Mare Balticum (with Latvian Radio Big Band)	Released: 13 June 2016; Label: Mūsdienu Mūzikas Centrs (CD016); Formats: CD-ROM, digital download	—	
James Morrison with His Academy Jazz Orchestra	Released: November 2016; Label: ABC; Format: Digital download	—	
The Great American Songbook (with BBC Concert Orchestra and Keith Lockhart)	Released: June 2017; Label: ABC Jazz (4815433); Formats: CD, digital download	—	
Ella & Louis (with Patti Austin)	Released: November 2017; Label: ABC Jazz (4816483); Formats: CD, digital download	—	
Midnight till Dawn (with William Morrison, Harry Morrison & Patrick Danao)	Released: March 2018; Label: ABC Jazz (6730676); Formats: CD, digital download	—	

== See also ==
- List of trumpeters
- List of jazz trumpeters
