= List of awards and nominations received by Dick Van Dyke =

Dick Van Dyke awards and nominations
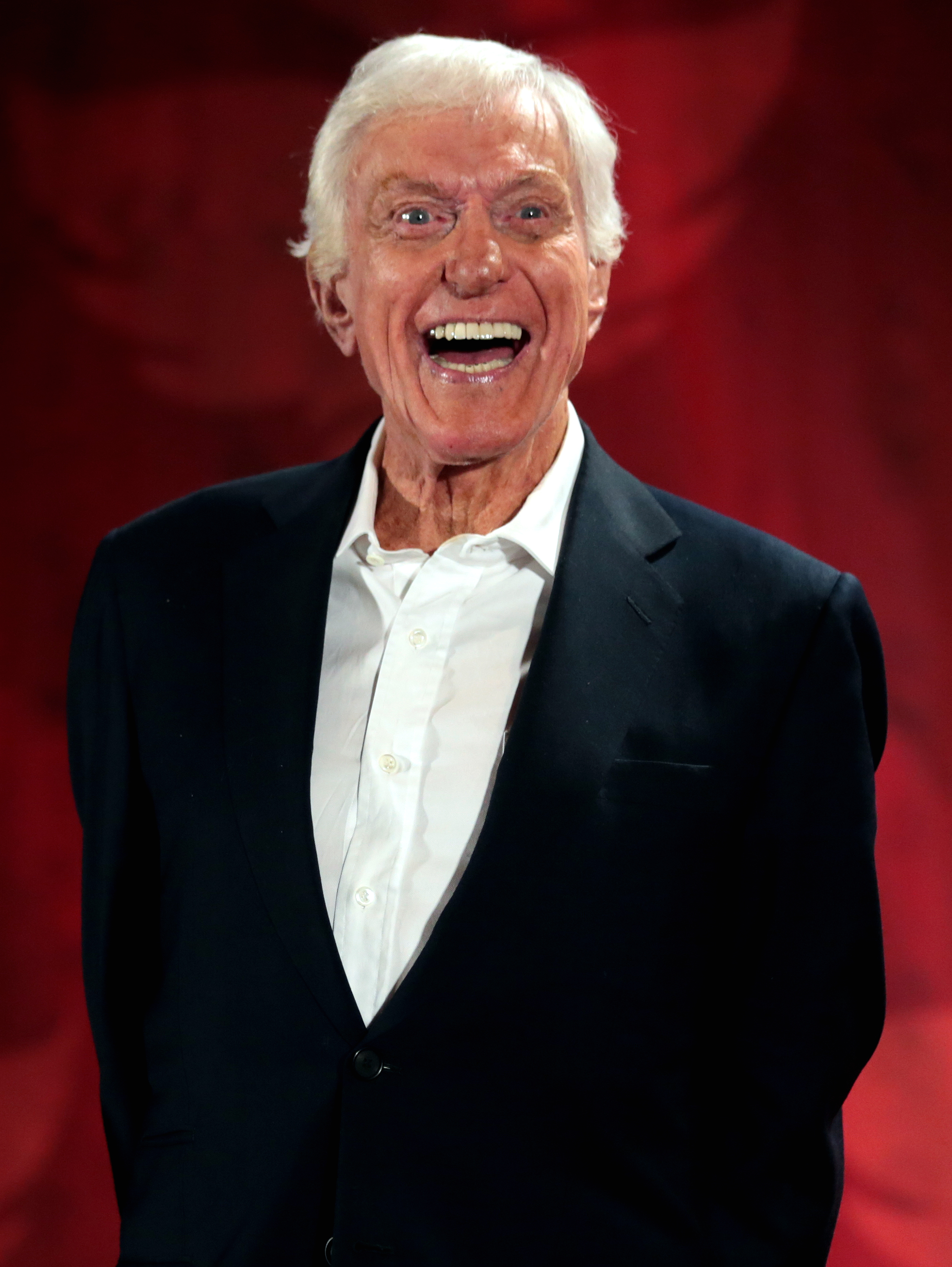
Awards and nominations
Major Awards	Wins	Nominations
Golden Globe Awards	0	2
Emmy Awards	6	12
Grammy Awards	1	1
Tony Awards	1	1
Wins	24
Nominations	47

This article is a List of awards and nominations received by Dick Van Dyke.

Dick Van Dyke, is an American entertainer, actor, singer, dancer, comedian, author, and activist. His career has spanned seven decades in theatre, live performance, recordings, television, and film. He has received six Emmy Awards, a Grammy Award, and a Tony Award. He is a recipient of the Screen Actors Guild Life Achievement Award in 2012, a Britannia Awards Lifetime Achievement Award in 2017, the Kennedy Center Honors in 2021. He was inducted into the Television Hall of Fame in 1995, and was instituted into the Disney Legends Hall of Fame in 1998.

Van Dyke won three Primetime Emmy Awards for Outstanding Lead Actor in a Comedy Series for his role as Rob Petrie in the CBS sitcom The Dick Van Dyke Show (1961–1966) as well as the Outstanding Comedy-Variety or Music Series for the NBC series Van Dyke and Company (1976). He also received nominations for Best Actor in a Motion Picture – Musical or Comedy for Mary Poppins (1964) and Best Actor – Television Series Musical or Comedy for The New Dick Van Dyke Show (1971). He won the Grammy Award for Best Children's Music Album for Mary Poppins (1964). For his role as Albert Peterson in the Broadway musical Bye Bye Birdie (1961) he won the Tony Award for Best Actor in a Musical.

== Major awards ==
=== Golden Globe Awards ===
Year	Category	Nominated work	Result	Ref.
1964	Best Actor – Motion Picture Musical or Comedy	Mary Poppins	Nominated	
1971	Best Actor – Television Series Musical or Comedy	The New Dick Van Dyke Show	Nominated	

=== Emmy Awards ===
Year	Category	Nominated work	Result	Ref.
Primetime Emmy Awards
1963	Outstanding Actor in a Comedy Series	The Dick Van Dyke Show (season 2)	Nominated	
1964	Outstanding Actor in a Comedy Series	The Dick Van Dyke Show (season 3)	Won	
1965	Outstanding Actor in a Comedy Series	The Dick Van Dyke Show (season 4)	Won	
1966	Outstanding Actor in a Comedy Series	The Dick Van Dyke Show (season 5)	Won	
1974	Outstanding Lead Actor in a Drama	The Morning After	Nominated	
1976	Outstanding Writing in a Comedy-Variety or Music Special	Van Dyke and Company	Nominated	
1977	Outstanding Writing in a Comedy-Variety or Music Special	Van Dyke and Company	Nominated	
1977	Outstanding Comedy-Variety or Music Series	Van Dyke and Company	Won	
1990	Outstanding Guest Actor in a Comedy Series	The Golden Girls (episode: "Love Under the Big Top")	Nominated	
Daytime Emmy Awards
1984	Outstanding Performer in Children's Programming	CBS Library: The Wrong Way Kid	Won	
2015	Outstanding Performer in an Animated Program	Mickey Mouse Clubhouse (episode: "Mickey's Pirate Adventure")	Nominated	
2024	Outstanding Guest Performer in a Drama Series	Days of Our Lives	Won	

=== Grammy Awards ===
Year	Category	Nominated work	Result	Ref.
1965	Best Recording for Children	Mary Poppins	Won	

=== Tony Awards ===
Year	Category	Nominated work	Result	Ref.
1961	Best Supporting or Featured Actor in a Musical	Bye Bye Birdie	Won	

== Honours ==
=== Britannia Awards ===
Year	Category	Nominated work	Result	Ref.
2017	Britannia Award for Excellence in Television		Honored	

=== Screen Actors Guild Award ===
Year	Category	Nominated work	Result	Ref.
2013	Lifetime Achievement Award		Honored	

=== Kennedy Center Honors ===
Year	Category	Nominated work	Result	Ref.
2020	Kennedy Center Honors	Honoree	Honored	

== Miscellaneous awards ==
=== American Comedy Awards ===
Year	Category	Nominated work	Result	Ref.
1994	Lifetime Achievement Award in Comedy		Won	

=== People's Choice Awards ===
Year	Category	Nominated work	Result	Ref.
1977	Favorite Male Performer in a New TV Program	Van Dyke and Company	Won	

=== Television Critics Association ===
Year	Category	Nominated work	Result	Ref.
2003	Career Achievement		Won	
