= Kaichiro Kitamura =

- Origin: Yokohama, Japan
- Genre: A cappella
- Occupations: Performer, vocal percussionist
- Instruments: Vocal percussion, vocals
- Website: Official website

Kaichiro Kitamura is a Japanese vocal percussionist, singer, and music teacher who has performed vocal percussion, in both a cappella and instrumental groups. He specializes in jazz but has also done rock, pop, and RnB.

== Sound and style ==
Kaichiro is a figure in mouth drumming well known for his ability to realistically vocalize the sounds of a drum kit, to provide the full rhythm section necessary for his projects and groups. He's developed a vocal percussion style characterized by his signature sound methods and usage of jazz drumming rhythms. He defines his style as "jazz vocal percussion". He is also a bass singer who can vocalize walking basslines.

== Early life ==
Kaichiro has performed vocal percussion since childhood and became famous as the Vocal Percussionist and baritone for the Japanese a cappella group "TRY-TONE".

== Career ==
Kaichiro has collaborated with many groups, including The Real Group, The House Jacks, and Naturally 7 among others. He is a member of groups, such as Australian A cappella quintet The Idea of North, and Japanese jazz quartets, "HamojiN", and also working as a freelance vocal drummer with other instrumental bands. He is an avid jazz vocal percussion instructor who has taught workshops around the world. He is also serving as a Japanese Artistic Adviser of 'Vocal Asia' -Asian vocal music network in Taiwan.

== Discography ==
=== Collabs ===
- "Pollen" with The House Jacks. 2014
- "Balads" with The Idea of North. 2016

=== With Hamonjin ===
- "Spain" (Single). 2016
