= Dick Van Dyke =

American actor and comedian (born 1925)

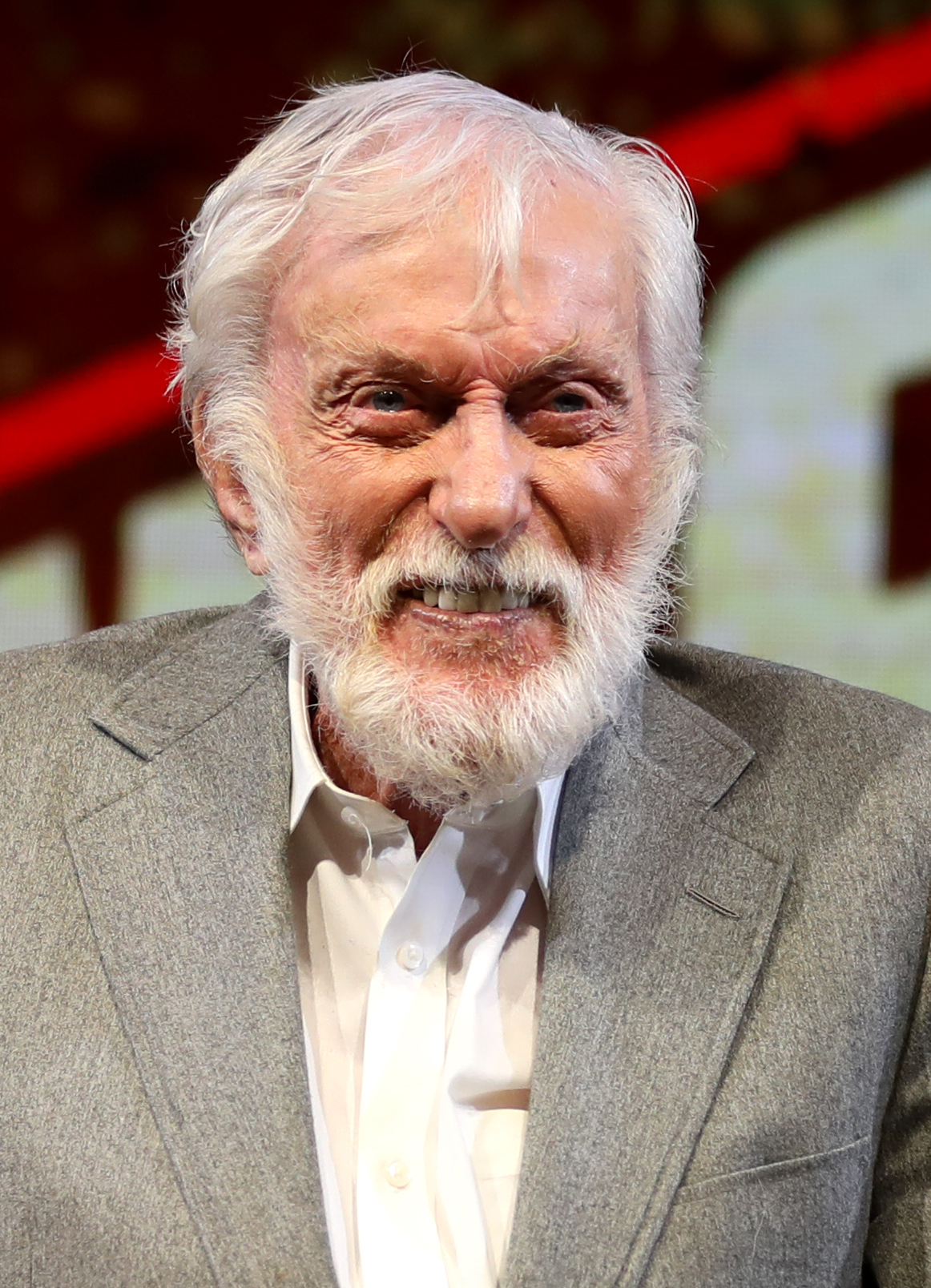
- Van Dyke in 2024
- Born: Richard Wayne Van Dyke; December 13, 1925 (age 100); West Plains, Missouri, U.S.
- Occupations: Actor; comedian; singer; dancer; writer
- Years active: 1947–present
- Works: Full list
- Spouses: Margie Willett (m. 1948; div. 1984); Arlene Silver (m. 2012)
- Partner: Michelle Triola Marvin (1976–2009; her death)
- Children: 4, including Barry
- Relatives: Jerry Van Dyke (brother); Shane Van Dyke (grandson)
- Awards: List of awards and honors
- Military service
- Allegiance: United States
- Service: United States Army Air Forces
- Service years: 1944–1946
- Rank: Staff sergeant
- Unit: Armed Forces Radio Service
- Wars: World War II; American theater
- Awards: Good Conduct Medal

Richard Wayne Van Dyke (born December 13, 1925) is an American actor, comedian, singer, dancer and writer. His work spans screen and stage, and his awards include six Emmy Awards, a Grammy Award, and a Tony Award. He was inducted into the Hollywood Walk of Fame in 1993, and then the Television Hall of Fame in 1995. He was recognized as a Disney Legend in 1998. He has been honored with the Screen Actors Guild Life Achievement Award in 2013, and the Kennedy Center Honors in 2020.

Van Dyke began his career as an entertainer on radio, television and in nightclubs. He made his Broadway debut in the musical revue The Girls Against the Boys (1959). The following year he starred as Albert F. Peterson in the original production of Bye Bye Birdie (1960), a role which earned him the Tony Award for Best Featured Actor in a Musical. He returned to Broadway playing Harold Hill in a revival of The Music Man (1980).

On television, Van Dyke became a household name in the United States and Canada portraying Rob Petrie in the CBS sitcom The Dick Van Dyke Show (1961–1966), which also earned him three Primetime Emmy Awards for Outstanding Lead Actor in a Comedy Series. He guest-starred on shows such as Columbo (1974) and The Carol Burnett Show (1977), and starred in The New Dick Van Dyke Show (1971–1974), Diagnosis: Murder (1993–2001), and Murder 101 (2006–2008).

Van Dyke is also known for his role as Bert, the cockney jack-of-all-trades (one-man band, screever, chimney sweep, and kite seller) in the Disney movie musical Mary Poppins (1964), for which he was nominated for the Golden Globe Award for Best Actor in a Motion Picture – Musical or Comedy. He starred in the movie musicals Bye Bye Birdie (1963) and Chitty Chitty Bang Bang (1968), as well as the comedy-drama The Comic (1969). In his later years, Van Dyke has taken supporting roles in films such as Dick Tracy (1990), Curious George (2006), Night at the Museum (2006), its 2014 sequel, and Mary Poppins Returns (2018).

== Early life and education ==
Richard Wayne Van Dyke was born on December 13, 1925, in West Plains, Missouri, to Hazel Victoria (née McCord), a stenographer, and Loren Wayne "Cookie" Van Dyke, a salesman. He grew up in Danville, Illinois. He is the older brother of actor Jerry Van Dyke, who appeared as his brother in The Dick Van Dyke Show. Van Dyke is a Dutch surname, although he also has English, Irish, and Scottish ancestry. His family line traces back to Mayflower passenger John Alden.

Van Dyke attended Danville High School in 1944, where he participated in the a cappella choir and drama club. He performed in the drama program with Bobby Short and Donald O'Connor, and his involvement convinced him to become a professional entertainer, although he also considered a career in the ministry.

Van Dyke left high school during his senior year to join the United States Army Air Forces for pilot training during World War II. He was repeatedly rejected for being underweight before being accepted after eating numerous bananas and drinking a large amount of water prior to the weigh-in. He then began pilot training before transferring to the Special Services. He built and painted sets and performed for military personnel at Majors Army Airfield in Texas and then served as a radio announcer. He was discharged in 1946. Van Dyke received his high school diploma in 2004.

== Career ==
=== 1947–1959: Early work and Broadway debut ===
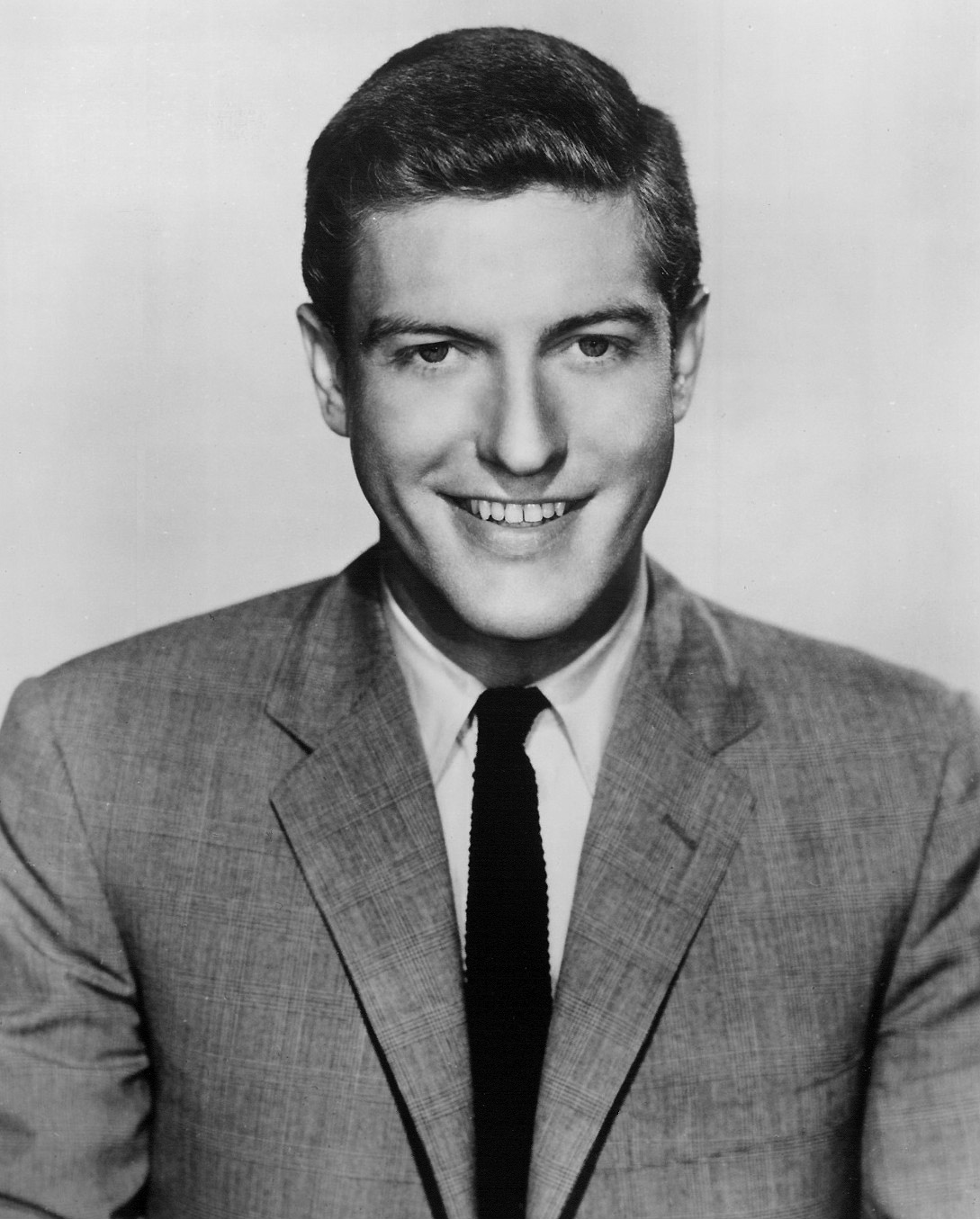
Van Dyke in a 1959 publicity photo

During the late 1940s, Van Dyke was a radio DJ on WDAN in Danville, Illinois. In 1947, Van Dyke was persuaded by pantomime performer Phil Erickson to form a comedy duo called "Eric and Van—the Merry Mutes." The team toured the West Coast nightclub circuit, performing a mime act and lip synching to 78 rpm records. They moved to Atlanta, Georgia, in the early 1950s and performed on a local television show featuring original skits and music called The Merry Mutes. The Monday-Friday show debuted on WSB-TV on April 26, 1954.

In Atlanta, Van Dyke also worked as a morning disc jockey and radio talk show host. In 1953, he began hosting a daily children's show on a local Atlanta television station.

Van Dyke worked in television with WDSU-TV New Orleans Channel 6 (NBC), first as a single comedian and later as emcee of a comedy program. Van Dyke's first network TV appearance was with Dennis James on James' Chance of a Lifetime in 1954. He later appeared in two episodes of The Phil Silvers Show during its 1957–58 season. He also appeared early in his career on ABC's The Pat Boone Chevy Showroom and NBC's The Polly Bergen Show. During this time a friend from the Army was working as an executive for CBS television and recommended Van Dyke to that network. Out of this came a seven-year contract with the network. During an interview on NPR's Wait Wait... Don't Tell Me! program, Van Dyke said he was the anchorman for the CBS Morning Show during this period with Walter Cronkite as his newsman.

In November 1959, Van Dyke made his Broadway debut in The Girls Against the Boys which ran at the Alvin Theatre. The production was a revue in two acts and featured performances from Van Dyke, Shelley Berman, Bert Lahr, Nancy Walker among many others. The production ran on Broadway for 16 performances from November 2 to 14, 1959.

=== 1960–1968: Career stardom ===
==== Bye Bye Birdie (1960–1963) ====
Van Dyke played the lead role of Albert Peterson in Bye Bye Birdie, which ran from April 14, 1960, to October 7, 1961. Van Dyke starred alongside Chita Rivera, Barbara Doherty, and Paul Lynde. The production received mixed reviews from critics, such as from Brooks Atkinson of The New York Times, who praised Van Dyke as "likable" but opined, "As a production it's neither fish fowl nor good musical comedy. It needs work." Despite this, the musical won four Tony awards, including for Van Dyke, who won the Tony Award for Best Featured Actor in a Musical in 1961.

Van Dyke began his film career by playing the role of Albert J. Peterson in the film version of Bye Bye Birdie (1963). Despite his unhappiness with the adaptation—its focus differed from the stage version in that the story now centered on a previously supporting character—the film was a success. The film starred Ann-Margret, Janet Leigh, and Maureen Stapleton with Van Dyke and Lynde reprising their roles. Variety wrote of Van Dyke's performance, "Van Dyke displays a showbiz knowhow far more extensive than his television outings communicate".

==== The Dick Van Dyke Show (1961–1966) ====
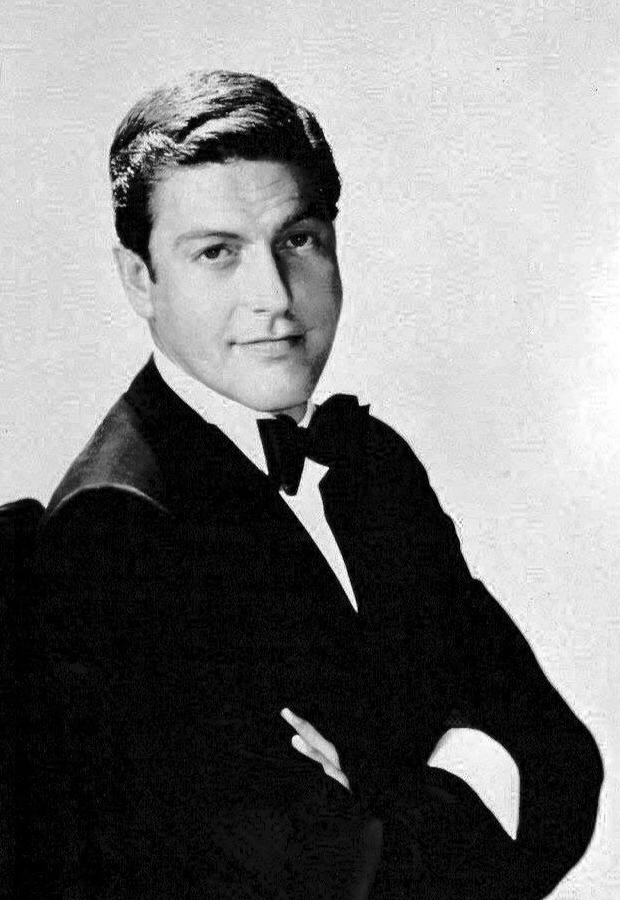
Van Dyke in 1964

From 1961 to 1966, Van Dyke starred in the CBS sitcom The Dick Van Dyke Show, in which he portrayed a comedy writer named Rob Petrie. Carl Reiner conceived the program and cast himself as the lead in the pilot, but CBS insisted on recasting, and Reiner chose Van Dyke to replace him in the role. Complementing Van Dyke was a veteran cast of comic actors including Rose Marie, Morey Amsterdam, Jerry Paris, Ann Morgan Guilbert, Richard Deacon, and Carl Reiner (as Alan Brady), as well as 24-year-old Mary Tyler Moore, who played Rob's wife Laura Petrie. Van Dyke won three Emmy Awards as Outstanding Lead Actor in a Comedy Series, and the series received four Emmy Awards as Outstanding Comedy Series.

The Dick Van Dyke Show received positive reviews from its start, with The Hollywood Reporter praising Van Dyke's comedic performance writing, "Sure to catch on as a new personality is Dick Van Dyke who, though he can play it straight when need be, proves a master of the double take, juicing up to solid laughs what would possibly be just amusing lines with his physical reactions. Yet, he doesn't over-mug. In this one, his "drunk husband" bit was a masterpiece of timing and ingenuity."

Ken Tucker of Entertainment Weekly reviewed the series following its Blu-ray boxset release in 2012 writing, "The Dick Van Dyke Show certainly wasn't the first sitcom featuring a lead character who presided over a TV-show-within-the-TV-show—Jack Benny's The Jack Benny Program, among others, had beaten Van Dyke to that. But this was the first sitcom to meld the workplace sitcom with the domestic sitcom so seamlessly. The episodes themselves move with the same smoothness and grace that Van Dyke and Moore did, whether the Petries were clowning, dancing, or romancing".

The series had a reunion in 2004 and was aired on CBS as The Dick Van Dyke Show Revisited with Ray Romano serving as host and Van Dyke, Mary Tyler Moore, Rose Marie, Jerry Van Dyke and Carl Reiner returning. Morey Amsterdam and Richard Deacon appeared in archival footage, both having died.

==== Mary Poppins (1964) ====
In 1964, Van Dyke was cast in two roles in Walt Disney's Mary Poppins: as Bert, a man who goes through multiple odd jobs, ultimately and memorably becoming a chimney sweep; and as bank chairman Mr. Dawes Senior. For his scenes as the chairman, he was heavily costumed to look much older and was credited in that role as "Navckid Keyd". At the end of the credits, the letters unscramble into "Dick Van Dyke", which was repeated in Mary Poppins Returns. In a 2003 poll by Empire magazine of the worst-ever accents in film, his Cockney accent came in second (to Sean Connery's performance as an American in The Untouchables, despite Connery winning an Academy Award for that performance).

According to Van Dyke, his accent coach—veteran actor J. Pat O'Malley—was Irish and "didn't do an accent any better than I did", and no one alerted him to how bad it was during the production. Still, Mary Poppins was successful on release and its appeal has endured. "Chim Chim Cher-ee", one of the songs that Van Dyke performed in Mary Poppins, won the Academy Award for Best Original Song for the Sherman Brothers, the film's songwriting duo. Van Dyke received a Grammy Award in 1964, along with Julie Andrews, for his performance on the soundtrack to Mary Poppins.

Many of the comedy films Van Dyke starred in throughout the 1960s were relatively unsuccessful at the box office, including What a Way to Go! with Shirley MacLaine, Lt. Robin Crusoe, U.S.N., Fitzwilly, The Art of Love with James Garner and Elke Sommer, Some Kind of a Nut, Never a Dull Moment with Edward G. Robinson, and Divorce American Style with Debbie Reynolds and Jean Simmons. But he also starred as Caractacus Potts (with his native accent, at his own insistence, despite the English setting) in the successful musical version of Ian Fleming's Chitty Chitty Bang Bang (1968), which co-starred Sally Ann Howes and featured the same songwriters (the Sherman Brothers) and choreographers (Marc Breaux and Dee Dee Wood) as Mary Poppins.

=== 1969–1992: Established star ===
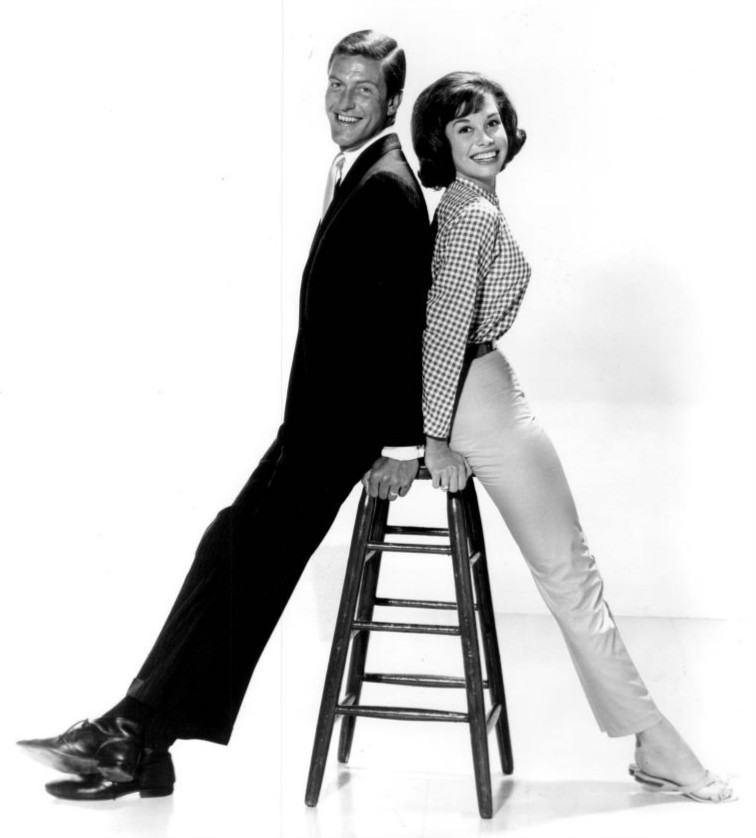
Van Dyke and Mary Tyler Moore from the premiere of The Dick Van Dyke Show, 1961

In 1968, it was reported that Albert R. Broccoli had offered Van Dyke the chance to replace Sean Connery as James Bond. Van Dyke declined the offer, asking Broccoli: "Have you heard my British accent?". In 1969, Van Dyke appeared in the comedy-drama The Comic, written and directed by Carl Reiner. Van Dyke portrayed a self-destructive silent film era comedian who struggles with alcoholism, depression, and his own rampant ego. Reiner wrote the film especially for Van Dyke, who often spoke of his admiration for silent film era comedians such as Charlie Chaplin and his hero Stan Laurel.

Also in 1969, Van Dyke played Rev. Clayton Brooks, a small-town minister who leads his Iowa town to quit smoking for 30 days to win $25 million (equal to $219,487,296 today) from a tobacco company. The film, Cold Turkey, was not released until 1971. In 1970, he published Faith, Hope and Hilarity: A Child's Eye View of Religion a book of humorous anecdotes based largely on his experiences as a Sunday School teacher. Van Dyke was principal in "KXIV Inc." and owned 1400 AM KXIV in Phoenix from 1965 to 1982.

From 1971 to 1974, Van Dyke starred in an unrelated sitcom called The New Dick Van Dyke Show in which he portrayed a local television talk show host. Although the series was developed by Carl Reiner and starred Hope Lange as his wife, and he received a Golden Globe nomination for his performance, the show was less successful than its predecessor, and Van Dyke pulled the plug on the show after just three seasons.

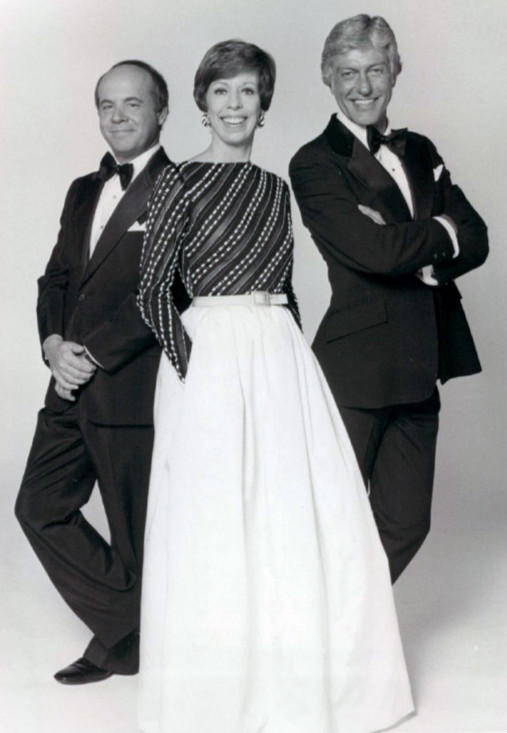
Tim Conway, Carol Burnett and Van Dyke, 1977

In 1973, Van Dyke voiced his animated likeness for the October 27, 1973, installment of Hanna-Barbera's The New Scooby-Doo Movies, "Scooby-Doo Meets Dick Van Dyke", the series' final first-run episode. In 1974, he received an Emmy Award nomination for his role as an alcoholic businessman in the television movie The Morning After (1974). Van Dyke revealed after its release that he had recently overcome a real-life drinking problem; he admitted he had been an alcoholic for 25 years. That same year he guest-starred as a murderous photographer on an episode of Columbo, Negative Reaction.

In 1976, Van Dyke returned to comedy with the sketch comedy show Van Dyke and Company, on which Andy Kaufman made his prime time debut. Despite being canceled after three months, the show won an Emmy Award for Outstanding Comedy-Variety Series. After a few guest appearances on the long-running comedy-variety series The Carol Burnett Show, Van Dyke became a regular on the show, in the fall of 1977. He appeared in half of the episodes of the final season.

In 1980, Van Dyke appeared in the title role in a United States tour and Broadway revival of The Music Man.

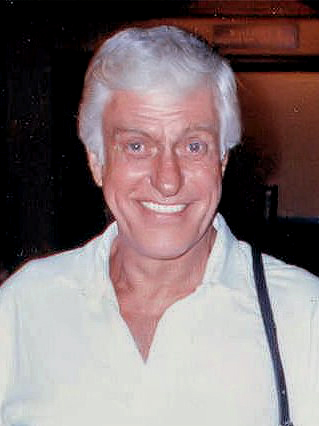
Van Dyke in 1988

For the next decade he appeared mostly in TV movies, including a made-for-cable remake of The Country Girl (1982) with Faye Dunaway. One atypical role was as a murdering judge on the second episode of the TV series Matlock in 1986 starring Andy Griffith. In 1987, he guest-starred in an episode of Airwolf, with his son Barry Van Dyke, who was the lead star of the show's fourth and final season on USA Network. In 1989, he guest-starred on the NBC comedy series The Golden Girls portraying a lover of Beatrice Arthur's character. This role earned him his first Emmy Award nomination since 1977.

On Larry King Live, Van Dyke mentioned that he turned down the lead role in The Omen which was played by Gregory Peck. He also mentioned that his dream role would have been the Scarecrow in The Wizard of Oz. Twenty-one years later in 1990, Van Dyke, whose usual role had been the amiable hero, took a small but villainous turn as crooked DA Fletcher in Warren Beatty's film Dick Tracy.

=== 1993–2001: Diagnosis Murder ===
Van Dyke's film work affected his TV career: the reviews he received for his role as DA Fletcher in Dick Tracy led him to star as the character Dr. Mark Sloan first in an episode of Jake and the Fatman, then in a series of TV movies on CBS that became the foundation for his popular television drama Diagnosis: Murder. The series ran from 1993 to 2001 with son Barry Van Dyke co-starring in the role of Dr. Sloan's son Lieutenant Detective Steve Sloan. Also starring on the same show was daytime soap actress Victoria Rowell as Dr. Sloan's pathologist/medical partner, Dr. Amanda Bentley, and Charlie Schlatter in the role of Dr. Sloan's student, Dr. Jesse Travis.

Van Dyke became a computer animation enthusiast after purchasing an Amiga in 1991. He is credited with the creation of 3D-rendered effects used on the Diagnosis: Murder episode "Down and Dirty Dead" and The Dick Van Dyke Show Revisited. Van Dyke has displayed his computer-generated imagery work at SIGGRAPH, and continues to work with LightWave 3D.

As an a cappella enthusiast, Van Dyke has sung in a group called "Dick Van Dyke and The Vantastix" since September 2000. The quartet has performed several times in Los Angeles as well as on Larry King Live, The First Annual TV Land Awards, and sang the national anthem at three Los Angeles Lakers games including a nationally televised NBA Finals performance on NBC. Van Dyke was made an honorary member of the Barbershop Harmony Society in 1999.

=== 2002–2025: Later career and television resurgence ===
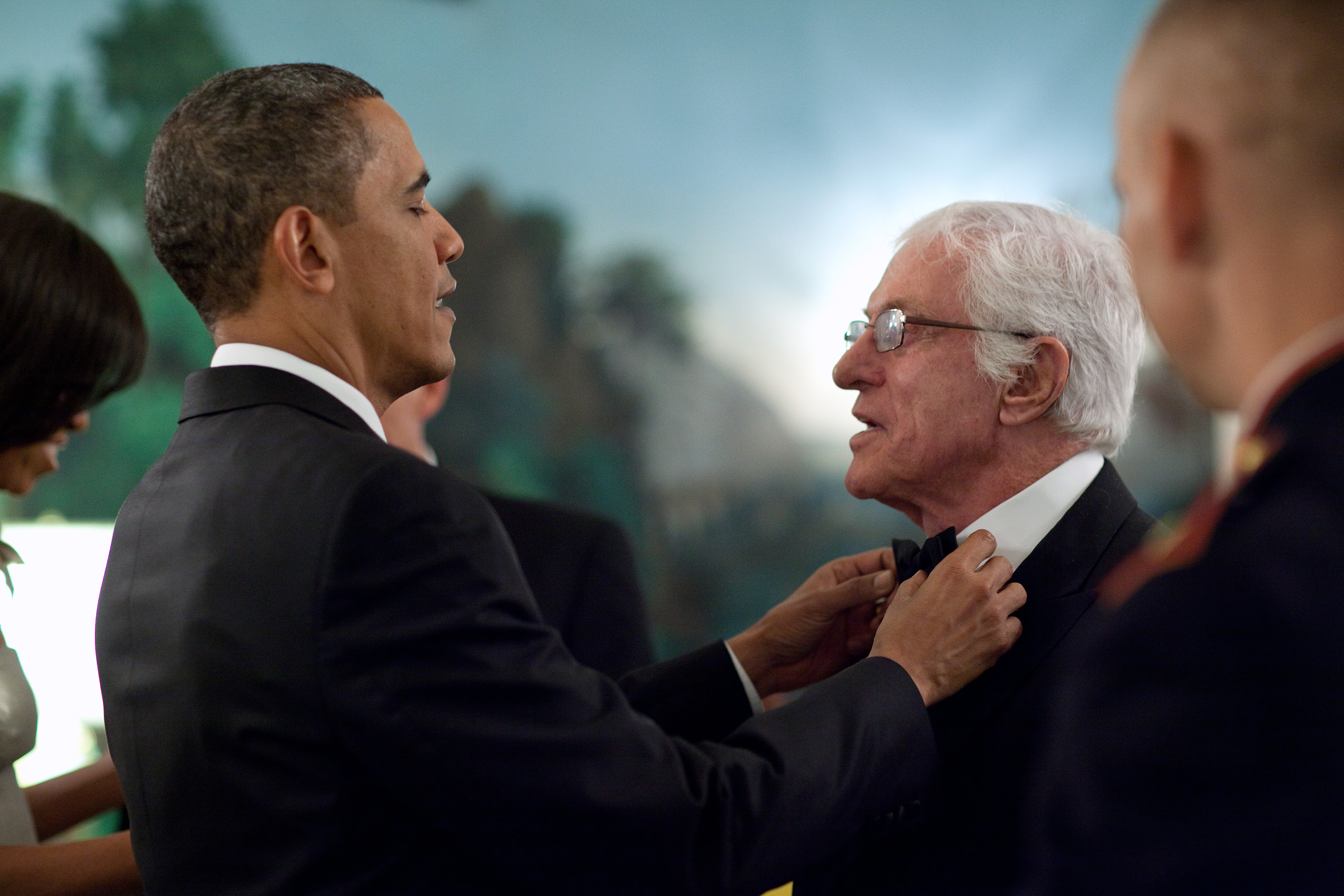
President Barack Obama with Van Dyke, 2010

Van Dyke continued to find television work after Diagnosis: Murder, including a dramatically and critically successful performance of The Gin Game, produced for television in 2003 that reunited him with Mary Tyler Moore. In 2003, he portrayed Doctor Doug Townshend on Scrubs. A 2004 special of The Dick Van Dyke Show titled The Dick Van Dyke Show Revisited was heavily promoted as the first new episode of the classic series to be shown in 38 years. Van Dyke and his surviving cast members recreated their roles and was nominated for a Primetime Emmy.

In 2006 Van Dyke starred as college professor Dr. Jonathan Maxwell for a series of Murder 101 mystery films on the Hallmark Channel, once again with son Barry as his co-star. Van Dyke returned to motion pictures in 2006 with Curious George as Mr. Bloomsberry and villain Cecil Fredericks in the Ben Stiller film Night at the Museum. He reprised the role in a cameo for the sequel, Night at the Museum: Battle of the Smithsonian (2009), but it was cut from the film. It can be found in the special features on the DVD release. He also played the character again in the third film, Night at the Museum: Secret of the Tomb (2014).

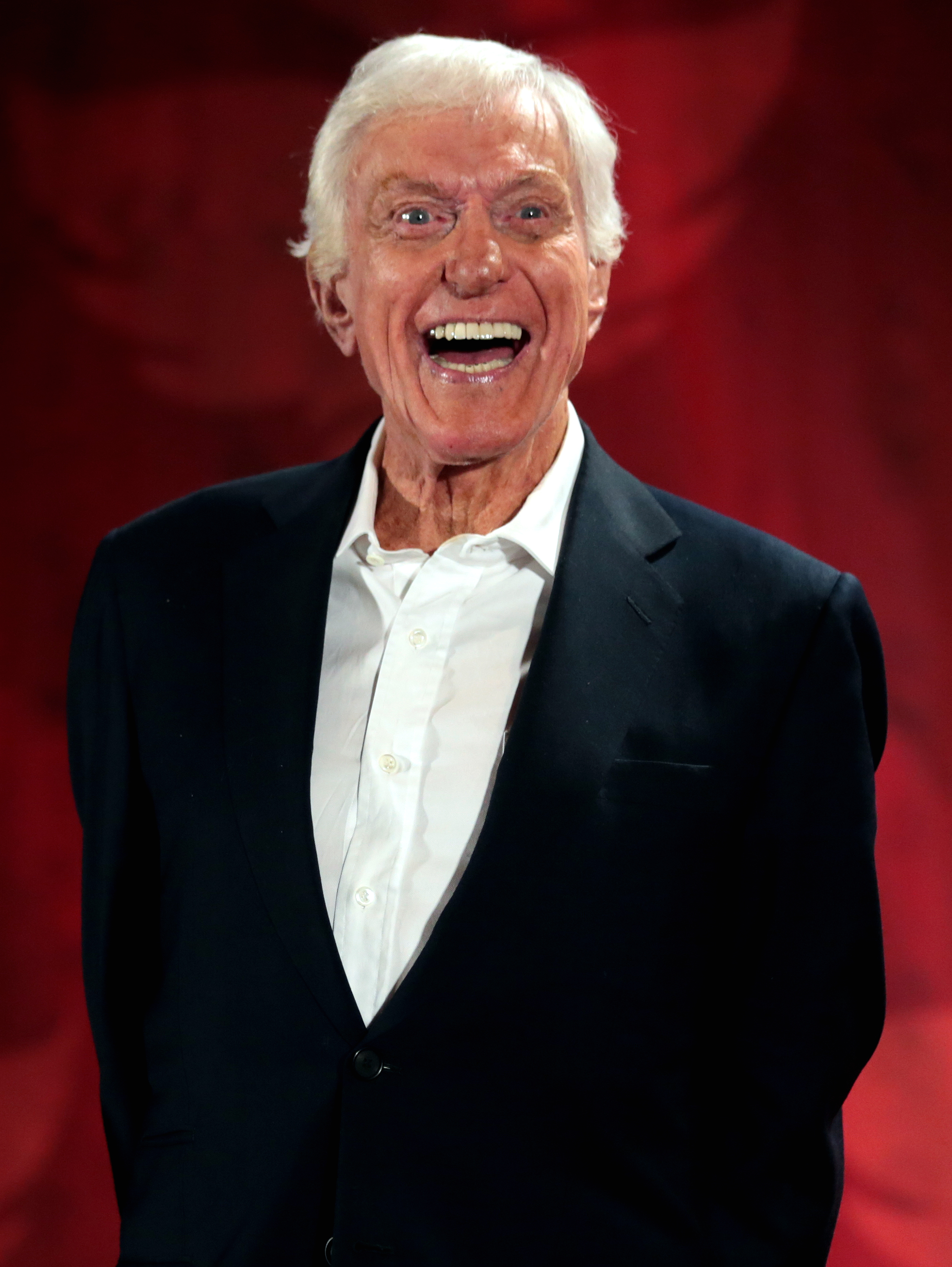
Van Dyke in 2017

In 2010, Van Dyke appeared on a children's album titled Rhythm Train, with Red Hot Chili Peppers drummer Chad Smith and singer Leslie Bixler. Van Dyke raps on one of the album's tracks. In 2017, Van Dyke released his first solo album since 1963's Songs I Like. The album, Step (Back) In Time, was produced by Bill Bixler (who also played sax), with arrangements by Dave Enos (who also played bass) and features noted musicians John Ferraro (drums), Tony Guerrero (trumpet & vocal duet), Mark LeBrun (piano), Charley Pollard (trombone) and Leslie Bixler (vocals).

Step (Back) In Time was released by BixMix Records and showcases Van Dyke in a jazz and big band setting on classic songs from the 1920s, 1930s and 1940s. Van Dyke recorded a duet single for Christmas 2017 with actress Jane Lynch. The song, "We're Going Caroling", was written and produced by Tony Guerrero for Lynch's KitschTone Records label as a digital-only release.

In 2018, Van Dyke portrayed Mr. Dawes Jr. in Mary Poppins Returns. He had previously portrayed both Bert and Mr. Dawes Sr. (Mr. Dawes, Jr.'s late father), in the original film. For the Marvel Cinematic Universe television series, WandaVision, Van Dyke was consulted by the producers on how to emulate The Dick Van Dyke Show.

In 2023, Van Dyke competed in season nine of The Masked Singer as "Gnome" and was the first to be eliminated. The episode had been promoted as "the most legendary, decorated and beloved unmasking in history". After Van Dyke revealed his identity, he received a lengthy standing ovation from the audience and judges. Before departing the stage, Van Dyke sang as an encore of his part in the song "Supercalifragilisticexpialidocious" from Mary Poppins, in which he starred. At age 97, Van Dyke became the oldest person ever to compete on the series. In April of the same year, it was announced Van Dyke would guest-appear on Days of Our Lives for several episodes. On December 21, 2023, he was honored with a CBS special, Dick Van Dyke: 98 Years of Magic, celebrating his 98th birthday.

On December 13, 2024, in celebration of his 99th birthday, Van Dyke starred in the music video for the Coldplay song "All My Love". He produced the video with his wife, actress Arlene Silver.

=== 2025–present: Centenarity and later ===
In December 2025, two documentaries about Van Dyke were released in honor of his 100th birthday: Starring Dick Van Dyke, which aired as part of the American Masters series on PBS on December 12, 2025, and Dick Van Dyke: 100th Celebration, which was released in theaters from December 13 to 14, 2025.

== Influences ==
Van Dyke has often cited Stan Laurel, Buster Keaton, and Carl Reiner as his comedy influences and idols. Van Dyke stated on Conan that he called Laurel and admitted to him that he had stolen from him over the years, and Laurel replied, "Yes, I know". Entertainers who have cited Van Dyke as an influence include Steve Martin, Chevy Chase, Conan O'Brien, Jim Carrey, and Bryan Cranston.

== Personal life ==
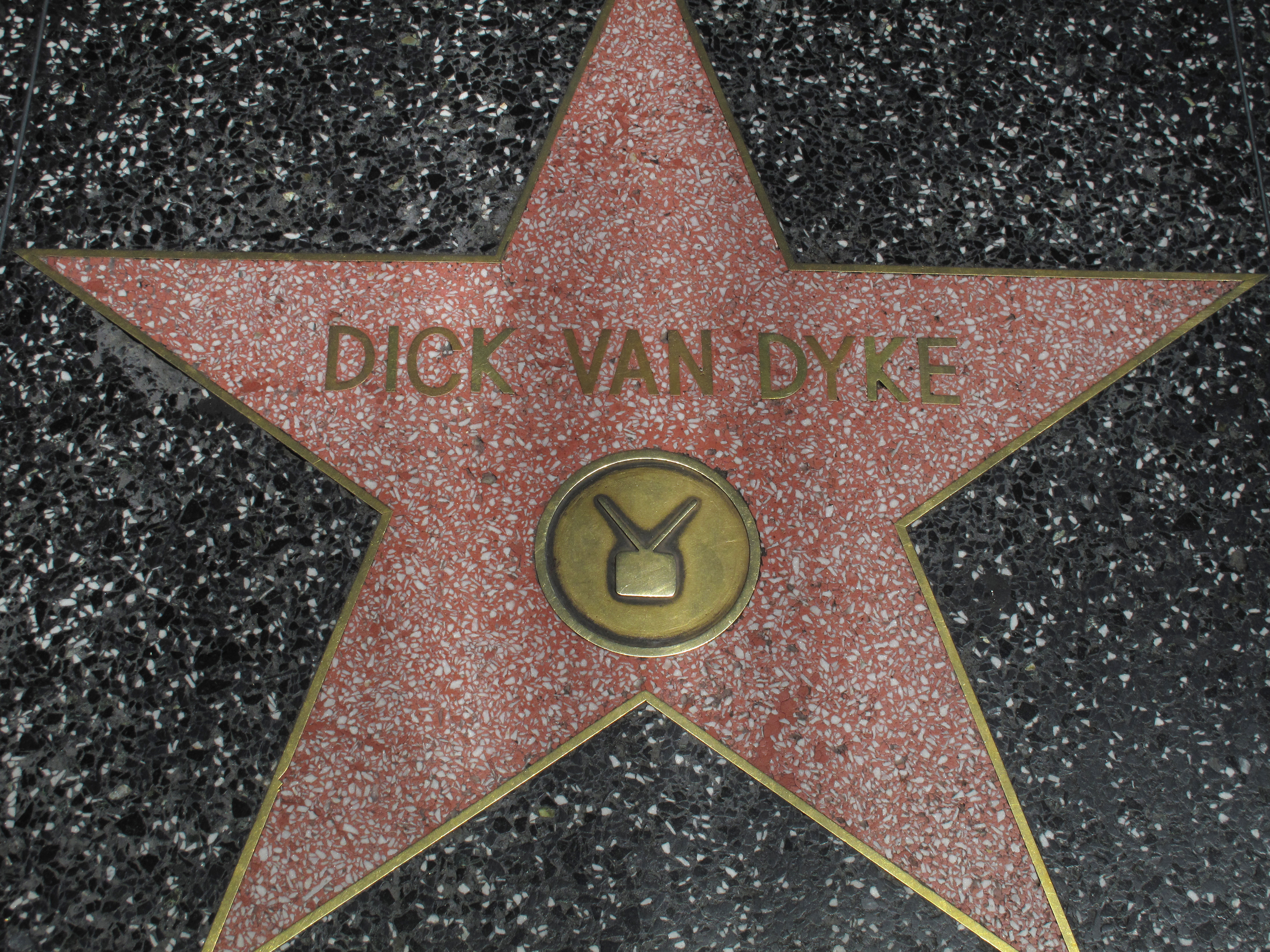
Van Dyke's star on the Hollywood Walk of Fame

On February 12, 1948, while appearing at the Chapman Park Hotel on Wilshire Boulevard in Los Angeles, Van Dyke and the former Margerie Willett were married on the radio show Bride and Groom. They had four children: Christian, Barry, Stacy and Carrie Beth. They divorced in 1984 after a long separation.

In 1976, Van Dyke began his relationship with longtime companion Michelle Triola Marvin. They reportedly lived together for more than 30 years, until her death in 2009. Their affair, which left Van Dyke "writhing in guilt", contributed to the breakup of Van Dyke and Willett's marriage.

On February 29, 2012, at the age of 86, Van Dyke married make-up artist Arlene Silver, 46 years his junior. The couple had met six years earlier at the SAG awards. While reporting on his 100th birthday on December 13, 2025, People journalist Liz McNeil stated that Van Dyke and Silver have been together "for nearly 20 years." In an exclusive interview with People, Silver admitted that she "didn't know a lot about him" prior to meeting him in 2006, and learned more about him through his fans on social media. She later would "connect him with his fans" on social media, which, according to Silver, Van Dyke "never really did before."

Van Dyke included his children and grandchildren in his TV shows. In addition to his son Barry Van Dyke, grandsons Shane Van Dyke and Carey Van Dyke, and other Van Dyke grandchildren and relatives also appeared in episodes of Diagnosis: Murder. Van Dyke has seven grandchildren. His son Christian was district attorney for Marion County, Oregon, in the 1980s and prosecuted the I-5 Killer, Randall Woodfield. In 1987, Van Dyke's granddaughter, Jessica Van Dyke, died from Reye syndrome, which led him to do a series of public service announcements to raise public awareness of the danger of aspirin to children.

Throughout his acting career Van Dyke continued to teach Sunday school in the Presbyterian Church where he was an elder, and he continued to read such theologians as Martin Buber, Paul Tillich, and Dietrich Bonhoeffer.

On August 19, 2013, the 87-year-old Van Dyke was rescued from his Jaguar XJ by a passerby after the car had caught fire on the Ventura Freeway in Calabasas, Los Angeles County. He was not injured in the fire, although the car burned down to its frame.

Van Dyke endorsed Bernie Sanders in the 2016 Democratic Party presidential primaries. In July 2016, while campaigning for Sanders, Van Dyke said of Donald Trump, "I haven't been this scared since the Cuban Missile Crisis. I think the human race is hanging in a delicate balance right now, and I'm just so afraid he will put us in a war. He scares me." Van Dyke again endorsed and campaigned for Sanders in the 2020 Democratic Party presidential primaries. Van Dyke endorsed Kamala Harris for president in the 2024 U.S. presidential election.

In December 2024, during that season's wildfires in California, Van Dyke had to evacuate from his home in Malibu. He said, "I was trying to crawl to [my] car. I had exhausted myself. I couldn't get up. Three neighbors came and carried me out." His home survived the wildfires. Van Dyke and Arlene stayed in their home during the January 2025 Palisades Fire, claiming he wouldn't be able to survive another evacuation. Later, in his book 100 Rules for Living to 100, he said that he and Arlene would, "Never leave their house again."

On December 13, 2025, Van Dyke turned 100.

=== Health ===
No one is genetically miserable. No matter our current circumstances, we all have the capacity for a joyful life. I've made it to 99 in no small part because I have stubbornly refused to give into [sic] the bad stuff in life: failures and defeats, personal losses, loneliness and bitterness, the physical and emotional pains of ageing. For the vast majority of my years, I have been in what I can only describe as a full-on bear hug with the experience of living. Being alive has been doing life—not like a job but rather like a giant playground.

— Van Dyke article in The Times, November 2025, on his health and outlook on life

Van Dyke is sober. In 1972, after struggling with alcoholism for years, he checked into a hospital for three weeks to be treated for his addiction.

Van Dyke was a heavy smoker for most of his adult life. In a January 2013 interview with the London Daily Telegraph, he said he had been using Nicorette gum for the past decade.

In April 2013, Van Dyke revealed that for seven years he had been experiencing symptoms of a neurological disorder, in which he felt a pounding in his head whenever he lay down. Despite his undergoing tests, no diagnosis had been made. He had to cancel scheduled appearances owing to fatigue from lack of sleep because of the medical condition. In May 2013, Van Dyke tweeted that it seemed his titanium dental implants might have been responsible.

In June 2025, Van Dyke was scheduled to attend a comedy event in Malibu, but had to cancel his appearance due to an undisclosed illness.

In an interview in November 2025, Van Dyke attributed his long lifespan to his positive outlook and the fact that he never gets angry.

== Acting credits and accolades ==
Van Dyke has received various awards, including a Grammy Award, six Emmy Awards, and a Tony Award. In 1961 he won the Tony Award for Best Featured Actor in a Musical for his performance in Bye Bye Birdie. In 1964 he won a Grammy Award for Best Children's Album for Mary Poppins. Nominated for 10 Primetime Emmy Awards, Van Dyke received four awards for his work on The Dick Van Dyke Show and Van Dyke and Company.

In 1998, Van Dyke was honored by the Walt Disney Company with their Disney Legends award. He became the oldest living Disney Legend following the death of Glynis Johns in 2024. In 2013, Van Dyke received the Screen Actors Guild Life Achievement Award.

In 2021, he was honored with the Kennedy Center Honors, where he was given tribute by Julie Andrews, Steve Martin, Chita Rivera, Bryan Cranston, and Lin-Manuel Miranda. Laura Osnes sang "Jolly Holiday", and Derek Hough performed "Step in Time" both from Mary Poppins (1964). Together Hough and Osnes performed "Put on a Happy Face" from Bye Bye Birdie. Aaron Tveit sang "Chitty Chitty Bang Bang" with Pentatonix.

In 2024, at the age of 98, Van Dyke received the award for Outstanding Guest Performer in a Drama Series at the 51st Daytime Emmy Awards for his performance on Days of Our Lives, becoming the oldest person to be nominated for and to win a Daytime Emmy.

== Published works ==
Van Dyke has written six books, including his memoir, which was published in 2011:

- Van Dyke, Dick (1967). Altar Egos. F. H. Revell Co. LCCN 67028866.
- Van Dyke, Dick (1970). Ray Parker (ed.). Faith, Hope and Hilarity. Phil Interlandi (drawings). Garden City, New York: Doubleday. LCCN 70126387.
- Van Dyke, Dick (1975). Those Funny Kids!. Warner Books.
- Van Dyke, Dick (2011). My Lucky Life in and Out of Show Business. New York: Crown Archetype. ISBN 9780307592231. LCCN 2012374545. (Van Dyke's memoir)
- Van Dyke, Dick (2015). Keep Moving: And Other Tips and Truths About Aging. Hachette Books. ISBN 9781602862968. LCCN 2012374545.
- Van Dyke, Dick (2025). 100 Rules for Living to 100: An Optimist's Guide to a Happy Life. Grand Central Publishing. ISBN 9781538777909.

== See also ==
- List of centenarians (actors, filmmakers and entertainers)
- List of members of the American Legion
