= Wes Carroll =

American singer

- Origin: Boston, Massachusetts, United States
- Genres: A cappella, indie rock
- Occupations: Vocal percussionist, singer-songwriter, multi-instrumentalist
- Instruments: Mouth drumming; Vocals; guitar; bass; keyboards

Wes Carroll (born September 27, 1970, in Schererville, Indiana) is known as a pioneer and teacher of mouth drumming, a form of vocal percussion from the musical genre of contemporary a cappella, now widely known as beatboxing.

== Career in A cappella music ==
Wes Carroll is one of the pioneering practitioners of mouth drumming a form of vocal percussion primarily through instructional videos and DVDs, first teaching the art in 1995. This art is now widely known as beatboxing and is a derivative of contemporary a cappella music.

Carroll was the vocal percussionist for the Boston vocal band Five O'Clock Shadow, and later joined the San-Francisco based "rock band without instruments" The House Jacks, founded by Deke Sharon.

He is a 1988 graduate of Culver Military Academy and holds a degree from MIT.

Carroll also teaches mathematics and is a puzzle enthusiast.
