= Steve Roslonek =

American children's music performer (born 1971)

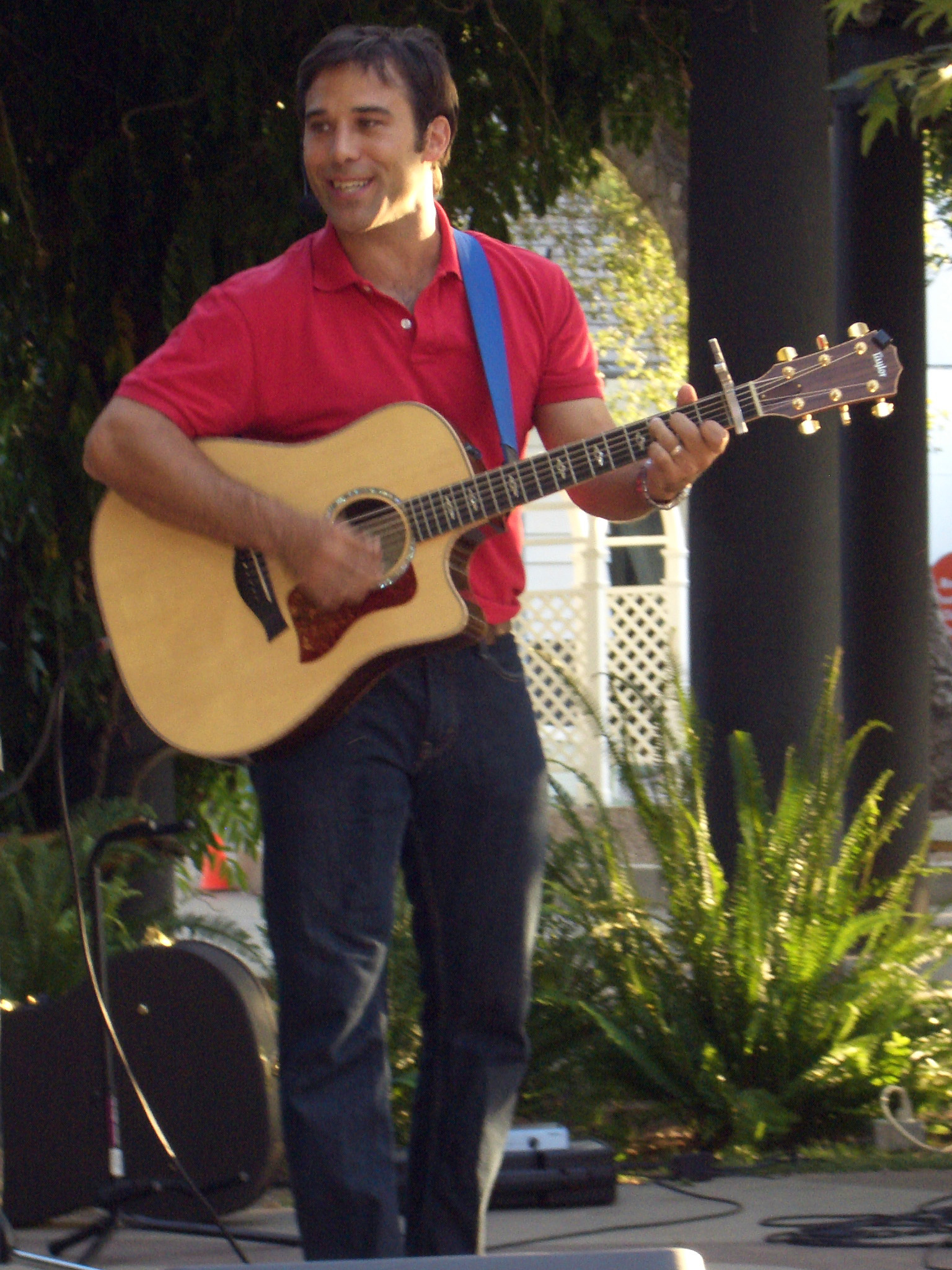
Steve Roslonek on August 16, 2008

Steve Roslonek is an American children's music performer whose band SteveSongs has garnered several awards from parenting organizations, such as the Parents' Choice Award and the iParenting Media Awards. His music is featured on the Miss Lori and Hooper segments of the PBS Kids Preschool Block, where he appears as "Mr. Steve" and performs original songs between other programs.

Prior to his career as a recording artist, Roslonek graduated from Wesleyan University and performed with a professional a cappella group on Martha's Vineyard. After graduation, he worked as a business and technology consultant with Andersen Consulting. He began performing in 1997 and moved to a full-time recording career in 1999. He tours extensively around the country, performing between 200 and 400 concerts in a year.

Roslonek resides with his wife and children in Old Saybrook, Connecticut.

== Discography ==
- Morning 'Til Night (1999): Parents' Choice Silver Award
- On a Flying Guitar (2000, reissued 2017): Parents' Choice Gold Award
- The King, the Mice and the Cheese (2001)
- Super Little Man (2003, reissued 2007): (Note: Originally titled Little Superman) Parents' Choice Silver Award
- Marvelous Day!: Parents' Choice Gold Award (2006, reissued 2017)
- Music Time with SteveSongs, Volume 1: Features songs from his appearances on PBS Kids
- Music Time with SteveSongs, Volume 2: Music from his 2010–2011 Appearances on PBS Kids.
- Orangutan Van (2012, reissued 2017)
