= Trish Delaney-Brown =

Patricia "Trish" Louise Delaney-Brown is an Australian singer and songwriter.

== Career ==
She sang soprano with The Idea of North, an a cappella quartet which she co-founded, until 2007. In 2011 she contributed soprano vocals for world music album, Beyond Bridges, by Azadoota. She has dabbled in many different styles of music, including music theatre, opera, cabaret, jazz ensembles, big bands and a cappella. Mostly though, she works in jazz. She now works at the Conservatorium of Music in Wollongong as Head of Vocals after taking a break to focus on family.

== Accolades ==
In 2003, she was given the 'Songwriter of the Year Award' by the Australian Songwriters Association. Her long running vocal group 'The Idea of North' also won an ARIA.
