= Dick Van Dyke and The Vantastix =

American a cappella group

Dick Van Dyke and The Vantastix is an a cappella quartet based in Los Angeles, CA. Formed in 2000, after a chance meeting at a coffee shop, the group has performed at a number of benefit and charity events, and released a children's album Put On A Happy Face in 2008, produced by BAMP productions.

== Members ==
- Dick Van Dyke — lead vocals. Van Dyke is an actor, dancer, singer, and comedian of film, television, and Broadway fame. Van Dyke sings lead on all but one of the Vantastix songs, and during live performances uses choreography similar to the style of his movies and in one instance "pop-n-loc".
- Eric Bradley — all around vocals. Bradley is a vocalist, voice-over actor, and studio singer originally from Connecticut. He also performs with a cappella group, Sixth Wave.
- Bryan Chadima — tenor. Chadima is a vocalist and actor who sings high tenor for the group, as well as the vocal percussionist. Chadima also performs in the goth-rock opera musical Vox Lumiere, arranges most of the Vantastix songs, and is one half of the production company BAMP.
- Mike Mendyke — bass. Mendyke is a graduate of MIT and former NASA engineer who now performs full-time and is one half of the production company, BAMP.

== Put on a Happy Face ==
The Vantastix album released in late 2008.

1. "Put on a Happy Face" 1:57
2. "You've Got a Friend in Me" 2:16
3. "Chitty Chitty Bang Bang" 1:42
4. "Baby of Mine" 3:28
5. "High Hopes" 2:55
6. "The Bare Necessities" 2:13
7. "Pick Yourself Up" 1:25
8. "A Lover's Question" 1:58
9. "It's Not Easy Being Green" 1:45
10. "Supercalifragilisticexpialidocious" 1:51
11. "Ac-Cent-Tchu-Ate the Positive" 3:01
12. "Theme from the Dick Van Dyke Show" 1:15
13. "A Visit from St. Nicholas" 3:18
14. "Old Fashioned Christmas" 2:35
