= The House Jacks =

American a cappella group

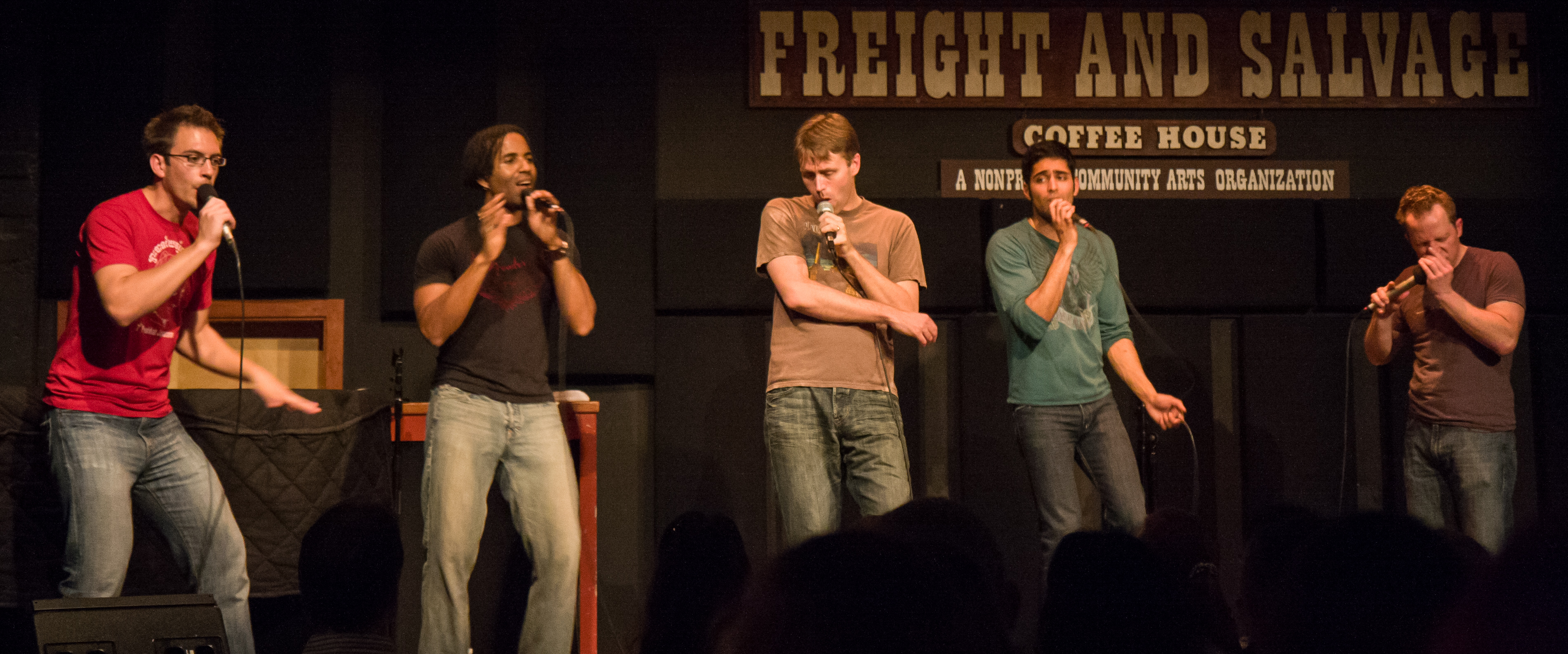
- The House Jacks at The Freight and Salvage in Berkeley, March 2008

Background information
- Origin: San Francisco, United States
- Genres: A cappella, vocal jazz, pop
- Years active: 1991–present
- Labels: Tommy Boy, Warner Brothers, Artelier, Hot Lips, A Cappella Records,
- Members: Colin Egan; Tracy LJ Robertson; Austin Willacy; Grayson Villanueva; Gregory Fletcher
- Past members: Matt Sallee; Deke Sharon; Tristan Bishop; Rob Penn; Marty Mahoney; Andrew Chaikin; Kevin Fudge; Garth Kravits; Bert Bacco; Wes Carroll; Antonio Medrano; Elliott Robinson; Jake Moulton; Roopak Ahuja; Troy Horne
- Website: www.housejacks.com

The House Jacks is a professional a cappella quintet from San Francisco, founded in 1991 by Deke Sharon.

The House Jacks describe themselves as a "rock band without instruments", their live shows typically include not only singing but also vocally imitating instruments such as trumpets, guitars, harmonicas and strings as well as taking audience-requests for songs and rendering them in musical styles unlike the original versions.

The group primarily performs original material (unlike most contemporary a cappella groups who focus on cover songs) and is considered the first professional a cappella group to have a dedicated vocal percussionist.

The group routinely tours the United States, Europe and Asia, has recorded numerous jingles and has garnered numerous recording and community awards (see below). The group was signed to Tommy Boy records (then a part of Warner Brothers) from 1994-1997, and Artilier Records (Germany) from 2000-2005.

They can be heard in the background music on NBC's The Sing-Off in the opening video, commercial transitions and elimination sequences. They have also created comedic bits and jingles for the radio personalities Mancow Muller and Rick Dees.

The group performed at the 53rd Monterey Jazz Festival on September 17, 2010. and have performed on stages from Carnegie Hall to the Gewandhaus.

They performed the Monday Night Football Theme "Are You Ready For Some Football" with Hank Williams, Jr. for the 2011 season.

Rolling Stone wrote about their inclusion in Ford automobiles, demoing the twelve speaker Sony sound system

Their version of "Since U Been Gone" was adapted for the audition scene in Pitch Perfect (Deke Sharon was on site music director, arranger and vocal producer for the film, as well as "Male Voice #1")

== Member changes ==
The original group of seven members met while singing in collegiate groups on the East Coast (Tufts Beelzebubs, Brown Jabberwocks, UNC Clef Hangers, The Dartmouth Aires) and relocated to San Francisco to begin the group in September 1991. Past members include Kid Beyond, Rob Penn, Garth Kravits, Bert Bacco, Wes Carroll, and Antonio Medrano.

== Band Lineups ==
Present

- Colin Egan
- Tracy LJ Robertson
- Austin Willacy
- Grayson Villanueva
- Gregory Fletcher

2017-Unknown

- Mark Joseph: vocals
- John Pointer: vocals, Beatboxing, instrument mimicry
- Nick Girard: Vocal percussion, vocals, vocal bass
- Austin Willacy: vocals
- Gregory Fletcher: vocal bass, vocals

2015-2017

- Nick Girard: Vocal percussion, vocals, vocal bass
- Matt Sallee: vocal bass, vocals
- Mark Joseph: vocals
- John Pointer: vocals, Beatboxing, instrument mimicry
- Austin Willacy: vocals

2012-2015

- Deke Sharon: vocals, instrument mimicry
- Austin Willacy: vocals
- John Pointer: vocals, beatboxing, instrument mimicry
- Elliot Robinson: vocal bass, vocals
- Nick Girard: vocal percussion, vocals, vocal bass

2010-2012

- Deke Sharon: vocals, instrument mimicry
- Austin Willacy: vocals
- Roopak Ahuja: vocal, instrument mimicry
- Troy Horne: vocal bass, vocals
- Jake Moulton: vocal percussion, beatboxing, instrument mimicry

2008-2010

- Deke Sharon: vocals, instrument mimicry
- Austin Willacy: vocals
- Roopak Ahuja: vocal, instrument mimicry
- Antonio Medrano: vocal bass, vocals
- Jake Moulton: vocal percussion, beatboxing, instrument mimicry

2006-2008

- Deke Sharon: vocals, instrument mimicry
- Austin Willacy: vocals
- Roopak Ahuja: vocal, instrument mimicry
- Antonio Medrano: vocal bass, vocals
- Wes Carroll: vocal percussion, vocals

1998-2006

- Deke Sharon: vocals, instrument mimicry
- Austin Willacy: vocals
- Garth Kravits: vocals
- Bert Bacco: vocal bass, vocals
- Wes Carroll: vocal percussion, vocals

1993-1998

- Deke Sharon: vocals, instrument mimicry
- Rob Penn: vocals
- Austin Willacy: vocals
- Tristan Bishop: vocals
- Bert Bacco: vocal bass, vocals
- Andrew Chaikin: vocal percussion

1992-1993

- Deke Sharon: vocals, instrument mimicry
- Rob Penn: vocals
- Tristan Bishop: vocals
- Bert Bacco: vocal bass, vocals
- Andrew Chaikin: vocal percussion
- Marty Mahoney: vocals

1991-1992

- Deke Sharon: vocals, instrument mimicry
- Rob Penn: vocals
- Tristan Bishop: vocals
- Bert Bacco: vocal bass, vocals
- Andrew Chaikin: vocal percussion
- Marty Mahoney: vocals
- Brannon Wiles: vocals

== Discography ==
Date	Title	Notes
1991	Sing Naked	Seven tracks, debut demo of original and cover songs.
1994	Naked Noise	Ten tracks, debut album, original songs.
1997	Funkwich	Twelve tracks, original songs.
2001	Drive	Seventeen tracks, live album of original songs recording during European tour.
2003	Unbroken	Ten tracks of original material modeled after Queen's A Night at the Opera
2005	Fitchy & Grikko	Twelve tracks, original songs.
2006	Get Down Mr. President!	Fifteen tracks, live album of original songs and covers.
2009	Good Things	Nineteen tracks, "best-of" album featuring tracks from their previous six studio albums.
2010	Level	Twelve tracks of original material.
2012	Blackjack	Twenty one tracks of unreleased original material (album cuts, demos, jingles, sound cues for The Sing Off, etc).
2014	Pollen	Ten tracks of original material, each with a guest a cappella group from different countries around the world

== Awards ==
- Contemporary A Cappella Recording Awards (CARAs)
  - 2004
    - Best Pop/Rock Album: Unbroken
    - Best Best Pop/Rock Original Song: "Good Things" from Unbroken
  - 2006
    - Best Original Song: "This Man's Pride" from "Fitchy & Grikko"
  - 2007
    - Runner Up, Best Pop/Rock Album: Get Down Mr. President!!
  - 2011
    - Best Pop/Rock Album: Level
    - Best Pop/Rock Original Song: "Red Dress" from Level
    - Best Professional Original Song: "You Were Everything" from Level
  - 2015
    - Best Pop/Rock Album: Pollen
    - Best Original Song by a Professional Group: "Talk2Me" from Pollen
    - Runner Up: Best Pop/Rock Song: "As It Falls Apart" from Pollen
    - Runner Up: Best HipHop/R&B Song: "Talk2Me" from Pollen
- A Cappella Community Awards (ACAs)
  - 2010
    - Favorite Vocal Percussionist: Jake Moulton
    - Favorite Songwriter: Austin Willacy
    - Favorite Arranger: Deke Sharon
    - Favorite Moment: Jake Moulton's turntables from House Jacks SoJam performance
  - 2011
    - Favorite Professional Album: Level
    - Favorite Male Vocalist: Roopak Ahuja (runner up)
    - Favorite Vocal Percussionist: Jake Moulton
    - Favorite Songwriter: Austin Willacy
    - Favorite Song That Doesn't Sound A Cappella: "You Were Everything" from Level
    - Favorite Original Song: "Red Dress" from Level
    - Favorite Album Art: Level
