= Vocal percussion =

Vocal sounds that approximate percussion

Vocal percussion is the art of creating sounds with one's mouth that approximate, imitate, or otherwise serve the same purpose as a percussion instrument, whether in a group of singers, an instrumental ensemble, or solo.

== In Western music ==
Recent musicological research points at Brazilian songwriter and musician Marcos Valle as a pioneer of vocal percussion. In the track "Mentira" from his 1973 album Previsão do Tempo, Valle imitates a drum kit with his voice.

Beatboxing, an art form pioneered by rapper Doug E. Fresh, is one school of vocal percussion, originating in hip-hop music and often used to accompany rapping. Stylistically, it is more expansive than traditional vocal percussion as it involves mimicking other sound effects and instruments with the voice such as trumpets, scratches, and bass-lines. It is utilized by many musicians spanning over a wide variety of genres.

== In Indian music ==
Vocal percussion is also an integral part of many world music traditions, most notably in the traditions of North India (bols) and South India (solkattu). Syllables are used to learn percussion compositions, and each syllable signifies what stroke or combination of strokes the percussionist must use.

The art of speaking these syllables is called konnakol in South India, and traditional dance ensembles sometimes have a dedicated konnakol singer, although this practice is now waning. At one time it was a very respected art form, with many masters and singers.

In North India, the practice of reciting bols is usually limited to the percussionist reciting the composition about to be played, often in the context of a longer solo. These recitations are also sometimes spoken by a Kathak dancer.

== Mouth drumming ==
Mouth drumming is a form of Beatboxing which involves vocally imitating the sound of a drum kit as precisely as possible in order to use the voice to serve the same function as a drummer in a musical setting. It is mostly used in a cappella music but has also been used in rock and jazz. Artists who specialize in this technique are simply referred to as vocal percussionists.

=== History ===
Wes Carroll is credited as the term coiner and pioneering practitioner of this art. Well-known for his ability to realistically vocalize the sounds of a drum kit, and use them as the primary rhythm section in bands and a cappella groups, he inspired many vocalists and musicians to continue this art form after him. Jeff Thacher and Dave Baumgartner are other well-known pioneers.

=== In a cappella ===
Many a cappella groups use mouth drumming as a way of using the voice to provide a steady rhythm section for their music.

A cappella groups such as Five o-clock Shadow, The House Jacks, Rockapella, Overboard, SoVoSo, Transit and Naturally 7 are well known for further advancing the art and its popularity.

=== In rock and jazz music ===
Although it is not common, mouth drumming has also been used in traditional band settings. David Worm (who has also performed it for the a cappella group SoVoSo) has often incorporated the technique in his acoustic rock band "Glass house". Kaichiro Kitamura is a Japanese vocal percussionist specializing in this art who has incorporated it in both a cappella and jazz groups. Otha Major is another vocal percussionist and beatboxer, who has often used the technique in rock performances as well as with the a cappella group Kickshaw.

== Common forms of vocal percussion ==
- Beatboxing
- Konnakol
- Tabla Bols

== Notable performers ==
- Kevin Olusola
- Adam Rupp
- Kid Beyond
- Chris Sullivan
- Wes Carroll
- Jeff Thacher
- Kaichiro Kitamura
- Loire (Lori Cotler)
- Arun Luthra
- V. Selvaganesh
- Sheila Chandra
- Trilok Gurtu
- Bobby McFerrin
- Al Jarreau
- Marcos Valle
- Rachelle Ferrell
- Dafnis Prieto
- Antonio Fernandez
