= Motown & More =

Studio album by Rockapella
- Released: March 15, 2013
- Recorded: 2012
- Genre: A Cappella
- Length: 35:42
- Label: Shakariki Records / PAID, Inc.
- Producer: Scott Leonard; Layne Stein

Rockapella chronology
A Rockapella Holiday (2011)	Motown & More (2013)	Jams Vol. 1 (2017)

Motown & More is the eighteenth overall and thirteenth North American album released by the a cappella group Rockapella. Just like the live show it accompanies, the album consists of covers of classic Motown covers. This marked the final album that members John K. Brown, George Baldi III, and Steven Dorian can be heard on as they all left the band in 2013, 2015, and 2016, respectively.

== Announcement, publicity, and release ==
It was hinted through a post by the official Rockapella Facebook page made on May 31, 2012 that a new album would be released in the fall to go along with the new show the group planned to start in September 2012 entitled "Motown & More". The album was not released, however, and news was scarce until February 28, 2013 when the track list and estimated released date of March 11–15 was posted by the group's Facebook page. On March 10, a track preview video was uploaded to Rockapella's official YouTube channel, and the album was released on iTunes five days later on March 15, with physical CDs to follow.

== Track listing ==
No.	Title	Writer(s)	Length
1.	"Blame It On The Boogie"	Michael G. Jackson-Clark, David Jackson-Rich, Hans Kampschroer, Elmar Krohn	3:15
2.	"Brick House"	William King, Ronald LaPread, Thomas McClary, Walter Orange, Lionel Richie, Milan Williams	3:29
3.	"Papa Was A Rollin' Stone"	Norman Whitfield, Barrett Strong	4:01
4.	"(Stop) The Love You Save"	The Corporation (Berry Gordy, Freddie Perren, Alphonso Mizell, Deke Richards)	1:33
5.	"Dancing Machine"	Hal Davis, Don Fletcher, Dean Parks	2:46
6.	"Pretty Much You" (previously released on Scott's solo album Tokyo Robots)	Scott Leonard	3:28
7.	"My Cherie Amour"	Stevie Wonder, Henry Cosby, Sylvia Moy	4:02
8.	"Dancing In The Street"	Marvin Gaye, Ivy Jo Hunter, William "Mickey" Stevenson	2:46
9.	"Use Ta Be My Girl"	Kenny Gamble & Leon Huff	1:28
10.	"My Girl"	Smokey Robinson, Ronald White	2:11
11.	"Ain't Too Proud To Beg"	Whitfield, Edward Holland, Jr.	3:05
12.	"Just My Imagination"	Whitfield, Strong, John Lennon	3:45

== Personnel ==
- Scott Leonard – high tenor
- Steven Dorian – tenor
- John K. Brown – tenor
- George Baldi III – bass
- Jeff Thacher – vocal percussion
