= Where in the World Is Carmen Sandiego? (song) =

Song by Rockapella

from the album Where in the World Is Carmen Sandiego? / Primer / In Concert / Live in Japan
- Released: 1992
- Genre: A Cappella
- Length: 3:00 (Primer); 4:13 (In Concert); 5:44 (Live in Japan)
- Label: Shakariki Records; Amerigo Records; J-Bird Records
- Composers: Sean Altman; David Yazbek

"Where in the World Is Carmen Sandiego?" is a song by American a cappella group Rockapella that was written by Rockapella member Sean Altman and David Yazbek as the theme song to the PBS game show of the same name. The song is part of the larger Carmen Sandiego franchise. In 2022, the song was named one of the 100 Greatest TV Theme Songs in history by Rolling Stone.

It has been praised for its catchiness, skyrocketing Rockapella's career, increasing interest in a cappella music, and being arguably the most internationally recognizable piece of the Carmen Sandiego franchise.

== Production ==
After performing in a 1990 Spike Lee production called Spike Lee and Company: Do It Acapella, the producers of Where in the World Is Carmen Sandiego? contacted the group and asked if they wanted to audition to be the house band; they were ultimately successful. On the game show, the song was performed each and every week by the a cappella group Rockapella, preceded by the studio audience chanting 'Do It Rockapella!'. The song was co-written by Rockapella co-founder Sean Altman.

The inspiration for the song was the Jane's Addiction song "Been Caught Stealing" with a "hip groove" that Rockapella aimed to replicate, instead of coming out with a doo-wop sound.

The theme song was a hit and Rockapella's popularity skyrocketed; they appeared on Jay Leno's New Year's Eve "Tonight Show" broadcast in 1992.

In 2015, Mashable invited the group to reunite to sing the song for their website.

In the week leading up to the premiere of the Carmen Sandiego Netflix animated series, Rockapella released a new recording of the song, but the television show ended up using a different song. Nevertheless, a cover of the song is performed by several of the Netflix series' cast members in a bonus scene of the 2020 interactive special Carmen Sandiego: To Steal or Not to Steal.

== Critical reception ==
Decades later, the song is still one of the first things you think of when you hear the words "Carmen Sandiego." It's an iconic ode to nostalgia, created by a group that helped pave the way for the modern popularity of acapella groups like Pentatonix. And once you first hear it, it will never get out of your head.

— Gizmodo

Mashable deemed the song the most memorable part of the gameshow. Altman said he was "fortunate" that the song was so prominently played on the gameshow every day for five years, noting the exposure it gave the group. Entertainment Weekly deemed it "an infectious song that taught millennials about geography and harmony." Rewire named it "memorable" and "catchy". Bustle ranked the song as the best in the Carmen Sandiego franchise, naming it "one of the best themes in television history." Hot 104.7 deemed it an "acapella extravaganza". US Gamer's reviewer advised they were more familiar with the song than the educational games that began the franchise. Cinema Blend wrote that the song is impossible not to sing along to. Uproxx deemed it the most memorable part of the gameshow.
