= Out Cold =

Out Cold is a term for unconsciousness.

It may also refer to:

- Out Cold (2001 film), 2001 film with Jason London & Lee Majors
- Out Cold (1989 film), 1989 film with Teri Garr & Debra Lamb
- Out Cold (album), holiday CD by Rockapella
- Out Cold, musical project of Cherry Ghost frontman Simon Aldred
