= Don't Tell Me You Do =

Studio album by Rockapella
- Released: February 16, 1999
- Recorded: 1997–99
- Genre: A Cappella
- Length: 49:43
- Label: J-Bird Records
- Producer: Scott Leonard

Rockapella chronology
| Rockapella (1997) | Don't Tell Me You Do (1999) | 2 (2000) |

Professional ratings
Review scores
| Source | Rating |
|---|---|
| Allmusic | 4/5 stars |

Don't Tell Me You Do is the ninth overall and fourth North American studio album by the a cappella group Rockapella. It is the first album released by the group on a North American record label. All but two of the tracks were recorded during the fall of 1997 and originally released on the independent album Rockapella. When Rockapella obtained their North American record deal in 1998, the songs "Moments of You" and "Hold Out For Christmas" were added in the place of "Bed of Nails" and Don't Tell Me You Do was released in the spring of 1999. In 2004, when the album was re-released on Shakariki Records, the then rare 1997 studio recording of the song "Bed of Nails" from the original album, Rockapella, returned to the track list in the place of "Hold Out For Christmas", which can be found on the group's holiday album Christmas.

== Track listings ==
=== Original track listing ===
All tracks are written by Scott Leonard, except where noted.

| No. | Title | Length |
|---|---|---|
| 1. | "Moments of You" | 3:27 |
| 2. | "So Much Better" | 3:42 |
| 3. | "Don't Tell Me You Do" | 4:21 |
| 4. | "I Am Your Man" | 2:58 |
| 5. | "I'll Hear Your Voice" | 3:59 |
| 6. | "Have a Little Faith" | 3:57 |
| 7. | "A Change in My Life" (Written by: Billy Straus) | 4:37 |
| 8. | "Song 9" | 3:35 |
| 9. | "Why" (Written by: Josh Deutsch, Janna Allen) | 3:38 |
| 10. | "On the Last Night" | 4:04 |
| 11. | "Ellie My Love" (Written by: Keisuke Kuwata) | 3:31 |
| 12. | "Lift Up" | 3:35 |
| 13. | "Hold Out for Christmas" | 3:34 |
| 14. | "Folgers "Rockin' Morning" Ad" (Written by: Folgers Coffee) (Hidden track on only the first 25,000 copies of this album) | 0:45 |

Don't Tell Me You Do (2004 Edition)

Studio album by Rockapella
- Released: 2004
- Genre: A Cappella
- Length: 48:58
- Label: Shakariki Records
- Producer: Scott Leonard

=== Re-release track listing ===
| No. | Title | Length |
|---|---|---|
| 1. | "Moments of You" |
| 2. | "So Much Better" |
| 3. | "Don't Tell Me You Do" |
| 4. | "I Am Your Man" |
| 5. | "I'll Hear Your Voice" |
| 6. | "Have a Little Faith" |
| 7. | "A Change in My Life" |
| 8. | "Song 9" |
| 9. | "Why" |
| 10. | "Bed of Nails" | 3:34 |
| 11. | "On the Last Night" |
| 12. | "Ellie My Love" |
| 13. | "Lift Up" |

== Personnel ==
- Scott Leonard – high tenor
- Kevin Wright – tenor
- Elliott Kerman – baritone
- Barry Carl – bass
- Jeff Thacher – vocal percussion
