= From N.Y. =

Studio album by Rockapella
- Released: May 21, 1992
- Genre: A Cappella
- Length: 43:54
- Label: ForLife Records
- Producer: Masahiro Ikumi; Rockapella

Rockapella chronology
To N.Y. (1992)	From N.Y. (1992)	Bash! (1992)

Singles from From N.Y.
- 1. "Tokyo Yo-Yo" Released: June 19, 1992

From N.Y. is the second studio album from the a cappella group Rockapella. The album was a mixture of original material and covers of U.S. pop tunes.

== Track listing ==
No.	Title	Writer(s)	Length
1.	"Long Cool Woman In a Black Dress"	Roger Greenaway, Harold Clarke, Roger Cook	2:53
2.	"Zombie Jamboree"	Conral Mauge, Jr.; Sean Altman (3rd verse lyrics)	3:34
3.	"I Like You Very Much"	Sean Altman	2:28
4.	"A Change In My Life"	Bill Straus	3:53
5.	"Crazy 'bout An Automobile (Every Woman I Know)"	William Henderson aka Billy Emerson	2:34
6.	"When You Came"	David Yazbek	3:05
7.	"Just You, Just Me"	Brian Auger	1:49
8.	"Why"	Josh Deutsch, Janna Allen	3:20
9.	"Bed of Nails"	Scott Leonard	3:43
10.	"Fliptop Twister"	Sean Altman	3:49
11.	"Heart of Gold"	Neil Young	2:39
12.	"Sixty Minute Man" (Live-in-studio recording)	William Ward	1:41
13.	"Oh, Pretty Woman" (Live-in-studio recording)	Roy Orbison, Bill Dees	2:28
14.	"Hound Dog" (Live-in-studio recording)	Jerry Leiber, Mike Stoller	1:51
15.	"Tokyo Yo-Yo"	Ralph McCarthy, Masahiro Ikumi	4:07

== Personnel ==
- Scott Leonard – high tenor
- Sean Altman – tenor
- Elliott Kerman – baritone
- Barry Carl – bass

=== Special appearances ===
- David Yazbek – vocal percussion – "I Like You Very Much"
