= Live in Japan (Rockapella album) =

Live In Japan

Live album by Rockapella
- Released: June 2004
- Recorded: June 2003
- Venue: The Blue Note
- Genre: A Cappella
- Length: 73:30
- Label: Shakariki Records
- Producer: Scott Leonard

Rockapella chronology
Comfort & Joy (2002)	Live In Japan (2004)	Bang (2010)

Live In Japan is the fifteenth overall, tenth North American, and second live concert album by the a cappella group Rockapella. It was recorded during the group's "Wa" (Peace) Tour on June 2–12, 2003 at The Blue Note and was released a year later. Live In Japan is the final album founding member Elliott Kerman can be heard on, marking a key piece of Rockapella history as the group no longer contains any of its founding members. It is also the last album Kevin Wright can be heard on, since he left the group in December 2009.

== Track listing ==
No.	Title	Writer(s)	Length
1.	"House Of The Rising Sun"	Traditional	1:58
2.	"Moments Of You"	Scott Leonard	4:32
3.	"Here Comes The Sun"	George Harrison	2:43
4.	"Love Potion #9"	Jerry Leiber, Mike Stoller	2:45
5.	"No Doubt At All"	Elliott Kerman	2:33
6.	"Use Me"	Bill Withers	3:58
7.	"A Change In My Life"	Billy Straus	4:51
8.	"Have A Little Faith"	Scott Leonard	4:20
9.	"Don't Do It"	Cleveland Duncan, Bruce Tate, Dexter Tisby, Curtis Williams	2:10
10.	"Long Cool Woman In A Black Dress"	Roger Greenaway, Harold Clarke, Roger Cook	2:49
11.	"My Girl"	William Robinson Jr., Ronald White	1:55
12.	"Pretty Woman"	Roy Orbison, Bill Dees	2:42
13.	"Ellie My Love"	Keisuke Kuwata	4:31
14.	"Ue O Muite Aruko"	Hachidai Nakamura, Rokusuke Ei	0:36
15.	"Papa Was A Rolling Stone"	Norman Whitfield, Barrett Strong	4:17
16.	"Summertime Blues"	Eddie Cochran, Jerry Capehart	3:01
17.	"Where In The World Is Carmen Sandiego?"	Sean Altman, David Yazbek	5:44
18.	"Zombie Jamboree"	Conrad Mauge Jr.; Sean Altman (3rd verse lyrics)	3:42
19.	"Keep On Smilin'"	Jimmy Hall, Jack Hall, Lewis Ross, John Anthony, Ricky Hirsch	3:52
20.	"Smile In My Heart"	Scott Leonard	3:45
21.	"Dance With Me"	John Hall, Johanna Hall	2:35
22.	"I'll Hear Your Voice"	Scott Leonard	4:04
23.	""I Don't Speak So Good...Japanese"" (Hidden Track)	Kevin Wright	0:07

== Personnel ==
- Scott Leonard – high tenor
- Kevin Wright – tenor
- Elliott Kerman – baritone
- George Baldi III – bass
- Jeff Thacher – vocal percussion
