= Comfort and Joy =

Comfort and Joy, or Comfort & Joy, may refer to:

- A lyric from the Christmas carol "God Rest Ye Merry, Gentlemen"
  - "Comfort and Joy", an a cappella arrangement of "God Rest Ye Merry Gentlemen" from Old Friends (1997 Simon and Garfunkel album)
- Comfort and Joy (1984 film), directed by Bill Forsyth
  - Comfort and Joy (album), soundtrack album to the film
- Comfort and Joy (2003 film), starring Nancy McKeon
- "Comfort and Joy" (Justice League episode), an episode of the animated series
- Comfort & Joy, a 1999 book by Jim Grimsley
- Comfort & Joy, a 2004 album by a cappella group Rockapella
- Comfort & Joy (EP), a 2019 extended play by Tinashe
