= Jeff Thacher =

American musician (born 1967)

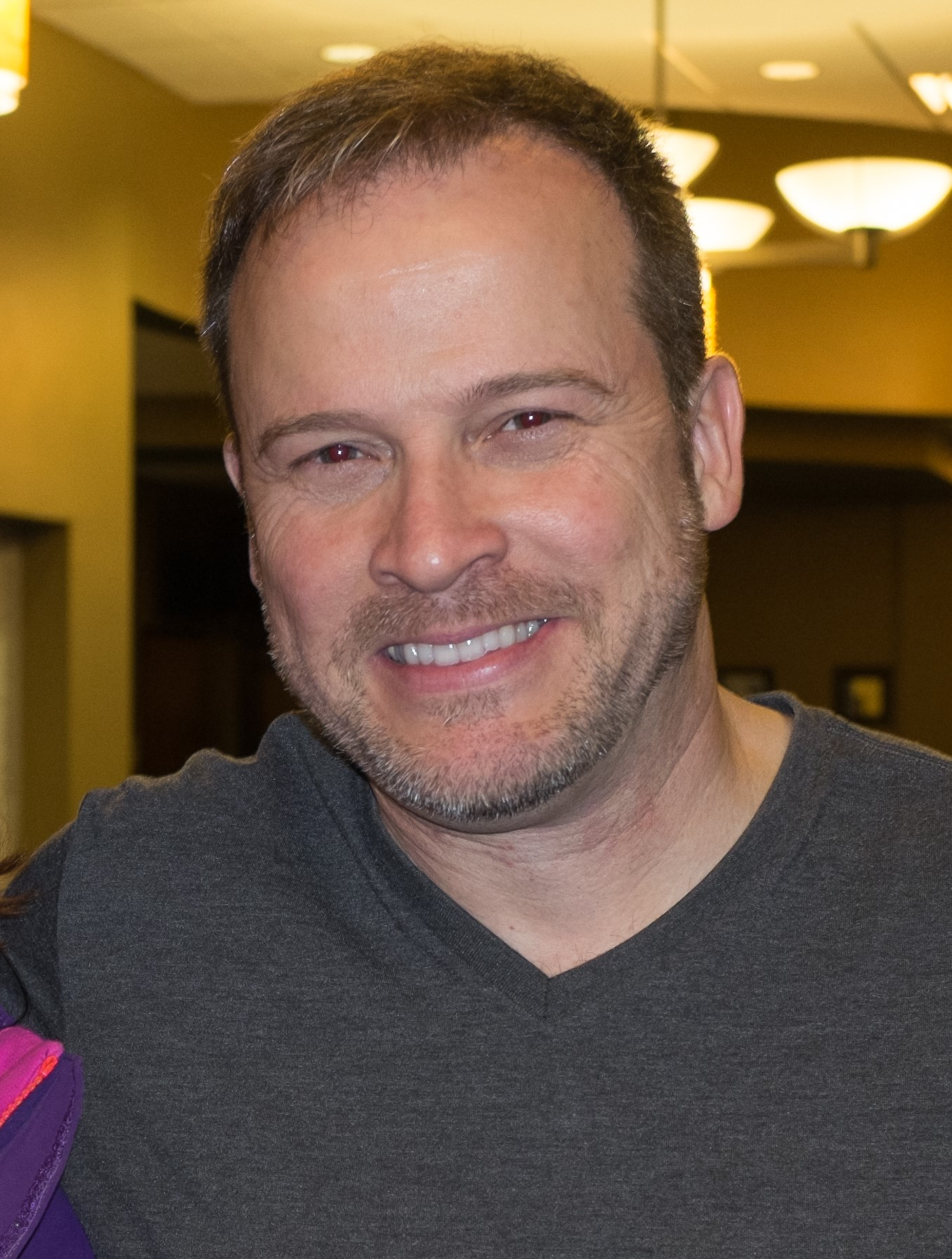
- Thacher in 2015

Background information
- Birth name: Jeffrey Thomas Thacher
- Born: December 23, 1967 (age 57); Noank, Connecticut, US
- Origin: Potsdam, New York
- Genres: A cappella
- Occupation(s): Performer, singer-songwriter, record producer, video director
- Instrument(s): Mouth drumming, vocals
- Years active: 1991–present
- Labels: Shakariki Records / PAID, Inc., Amerigo Records, J-Bird Records, Rentrak Records, ForLife Records
- Website: www.rockapella.com

Jeffrey Thomas Thacher (born December 23, 1967) is an American musician, best known as a member of the vocal group Rockapella. A professional vocal percussionist and singer who emerged on the early contemporary a cappella scene in 1991, Jeff Thacher co-founded the Boston-based a cappella group Five O'Clock Shadow (aka FOCS) that year and went on to join Rockapella in 1993 as their full-time mouth-drummer.

== Biography ==
Thacher was a 1990 graduate of Berklee College of Music's Music Production & Engineering program, and afterward spent several years in television & radio production when not performing

In 1991 Thacher performed as a tenor in Five O'Clock Shadow, when Rockapella was looking to add human-made drum sounds to their live shows. Thacher's first concert with the group was on May 15, 1993, at the Berklee Performance Center, after which he began touring internationally with Rockapella, making his first CD appearance with them on the song "Big Wet Rag" from the Carmen Sandiego soundtrack sequel Carmen Sandiego: Out Of This World (1993). The first album to feature Jeff's distinctive sound throughout was Rockapella's first all-originals album, Vocobeat (1994), for the Japanese market. Rockapella were still a quartet during their television stint on Carmen Sandiego until the fifth and final season of the show (1995) when Thacher appeared with them for that season.

As the mid-1990s progressed, the terms "organic" and "imitative" began to be used to describe contrasting a cappella vocal percussion styles, with Thacher as the most prominent progenitor of the "organic" approach, combining blatantly literal replication of drums with sounds that didn't seek to duplicate, but rather fill the role of a drum or percussive instrument. Thacher was also the first vocal percussionist to employ a throat microphone (aka "throat mic") using electronic guitar pickups adhered to the larynx area of the throat (see piezoelectric sensor). The technique allowed intentional throat grunting sounds to be heard more effectively in live shows and on recordings (1997). He became the first such artist to be professionally endorsed by a guitar pickup company (Seymour Duncan, from 1998 to present, now D-TAR).

== Performer Discography ==
=== Domestic releases ===
Release Date	Album/Single	Artist	Label
December 2018	Jams, Vol. 2	Rockapella	Shakariki Records
November 2017	"How Bout Now?" single	Rockapella	Shakariki Records
September 2017	Jams, Vol. 1	Rockapella	Shakariki Records
June 2017	"Workin My Way to You" single	Rockapella	Shakariki Records
November 2016	"Better 2gether" single	Rockapella	Shakariki Records
July 2016	"Sir GotALot" single	Rockapella	Shakariki Records
February 2016	"Candy Man" single	Rockapella	Shakariki Records
April 2015	"Rock Around The Clock / Tell Me Something Good" single	Rockapella	Shakariki Records
March 2013	Motown & More	Rockapella	Shakariki Records
November 2011	A Rockapella Holiday	Rockapella	Shakariki Records / PAID, Inc.
September 2010	Bang	Rockapella	Shakariki Records / PAID, Inc.
June 2004	Live in Japan	Rockapella	Shakariki Records
November 2002	Comfort & Joy	Rockapella	Amerigo Records; Re-released on Shakariki Records in 2004
August 2002	Smilin'	Rockapella	Amerigo Records; Re-released on Shakariki Records in 2004
March 2001	In Concert	Rockapella	J-Bird Records; Re-released on Shakariki Records in 2004
October 2000	Christmas	Rockapella	J-Bird Records; Re-released on Shakariki Records in 2004
March 2000	2	Rockapella	J-Bird Records; Re-released on Shakariki Records in 2004
February 1999	Don't Tell Me You Do	Rockapella	J-Bird Records; Re-released on Shakariki Records in 2004
Mid-1997	Rockapella	Rockapella	Independent
Mid-1996	Lucky Seven	Rockapella	Independent
Mid-1995	Primer	Rockapella	Independent

=== International releases ===
Year	Album	Artist	Label
2002	In Concert	Rockapella	Rentrak Records
November 2001	Christmas	Rockapella	Rentrak Records
November 1996	Lucky Seven: Memories And Dreams	Rockapella	ForLife Records
November 1995	Best Fest	Rockapella	ForLife Records
November 1994	Out Cold	Rockapella	ForLife Records
April 1994	Vocobeat	Rockapella	ForLife Records

=== Compilations ===
Release Date	Album	Artist	Label
September 2002	Best A Cappella	Rockapella	ForLife Records
2002	More Than Ever	Rockapella	Rentrak Records

=== Unaffiliated releases ===
Year	Album	Artist	Label
Summer 2005	Live at Duo Music Exchange	Rockapella	Duo Records

=== Miscellaneous releases ===
Year	Album	Artist	Song
2007	Hokie Nation: An A Cappella Tribute	Rockapella	"I'll Hear Your Voice"
2002	20 Christmas Stars, Vol. IV	Rockapella	"Merry Christmas Darling"
2000	Mark and Brian: Little Drummer Boys	Rockapella	"Silver Bells" (Live performance)
1999	Revival – Sam Harris	Rockapella	"A Change In My Life" (Background vocals)
1996	Voices Only: A Cappella Originals	Rockapella	"Bed Of Nails"
1993	Carmen Sandiego: Out of This World	Rockapella	"Big Wet Rag"

=== Solo/Other CDs As Guest Performer ===
Release Date	Album	Artist
2011	Unplugged	John K. Brown
2010	bOOmbOOm	John K. Brown
2006	Unorthodox	Sean Altman/What I Like About Jew
2005	Glory	The Groovebarbers
2002	Alt.mania	Sean Altman
2000	Some Children See Him	Gas House Gang ("Go Tell It On the Mountain")
1999	Hot Lips – The Vocal Band Sampler	compilation (The Nylons: "Monkey")
1999	Fabric Of Life (Vocal Percussion Remix)	The Nylons ("Monkey")
1997	SeanDEMOnium	Sean Altman
