= The SoLow Project =

Studio album by Barry Carl
- Released: July 1, 2004
- Genre: Classical
- Length: 57:38
- Label: South Mountain Productions, Inc.
- Producer: Barry Carl

The SoLow Project is the solo album vocal bassist Barry Carl released after retiring from the a cappella group Rockapella. The album consists of 20 songs split into four sections: Seven Spirituals for Two Basses, a selection of Negro spirituals; Four sea chanties; Quatre Chansons de Don Quichotte, a collection of songs by French composer Jacques Ibert written for the 1933 G.W. Pabst film Don Quixote; and The Songs and Dances of Death, a song cycle written by Modest Mussorgsky.

== Track listing ==
Seven Spirituals for Two Basses Arranged and performed by Barry Carl (All songs are traditional except where noted)
No.	Title	Length
1.	"Nobody Knows"	2:18
2.	"Steal Away" (Written by: Wallace Willis)	2:14
3.	"Let Me Fly"	1:14
4.	"Motherless Child"	4:09
5.	"Let My People Go"	1:55
6.	"Swing Low, Sweet Chariot" (Written by: Wallace Willis)	3:54
7.	"Joshua"	1:05

Four Sea Chanties Arranged by Celius Dougherty (All songs are traditional)
No.	Title	Length
1.	"Rio Grande"	2:17
2.	"Across the Western Ocean"	3:28
3.	"Shenandoah"	3:20
4.	"Blow Ye Winds"	1:18

Quatre Chansons de Don Quichotte by Jacques Ibert
No.	Title	Length
1.	"Chanson de Depart"	3:11
2.	"Chanson de Duc"	1:36
3.	"Chanson a Dulcinee"	3:09
4.	"Chanson de la Mort de Don Quichotte"	3:07

The Songs and Dances of Death by Modest Mussorgsky
No.	Title	Length
1.	"Lullaby"	4:48
2.	"Serenade"	4:23
3.	"Trepak"	4:36
4.	"Commander in Chief"	5:36

== Personnel ==
- Barry Carl – bass, vocals
- Ron Levy – piano
