= Spike & Co.: Do It a Cappella =

- Written by: Gerard Brown
- Directed by: Spike Lee; Ernest R. Dickerson
- Starring: Spike Lee; Debbie Allen
- Country of origin: United States
- Original language: English

Production
- Producers: Gerard Brown; Cherie Fortis; Spence Halperin
- Cinematography: Robert Leacock; Anastas F. Michos; Alain Onesto; Mark Whitman; Crystal Griffith; Rebecca Kurtz
- Running time: 85 minutes
- Production companies: Halperin/Brown Productions; Thirteen / WNET

Original release
- Network: PBS
- Release: May 10, 1990

Spike & Co.: Do It a Cappella is a 1990 PBS special directed by Spike Lee that aired as part of the Great Performances strand. It featured performances by The Mint Juleps, Take 6, Ladysmith Black Mambazo, Rockapella and The Persuasions. The special also starred Lee and Debbie Allen, and featured cameo appearances by Samuel L. Jackson and several of Lee's musician friends.

A soundtrack was released on Elektra Records, but it excluded eight of the songs.

== Plot ==
Lee films cameos of several of his musician friends expressing irritation that they cannot participate in his Great Performances episode, as he has decided to devote it entirely to a cappella music. Lee and Allen watch the show's opening in a cinema. Then, Lee takes Allen to a seemingly shady building in Brooklyn (actually the Brooklyn Masonic Temple), where they listen to Rockapella, True Image, The Mint Juleps, and The Persuasions.

Afterward, the two attend a concert with all the featured a cappella groups at the BAM Majestic Theater. In between songs, there are interviews with the groups as well as songs heard in backstage rehearsals. Finally, Allen, inspired by all the music that she has heard, suggests that she do her next album a cappella, to Lee's chagrin.

== Cast ==
- Spike Lee as himself
- Debbie Allen as herself

=== Cameos ===
- Samuel L. Jackson as the janitor
- Roberta Flack as herself
- Hugh Masekela as himself
- Branford Marsalis as himself
- Jay Hoggard as himself
- Bobbi Humphrey as herself
- Hon. David N. Dinkins as himself

=== Performers ===
- Rockapella
- True Image
- The Mint Juleps
- The Persuasions
- Take 6
- Ladysmith Black Mambazo

== Featured songs ==
1. "Zombie Jamboree" – Rockapella
2. "I Need You" – True Image
3. "Don't Let Your Heart" – The Mint Juleps
4. "Looking for an Echo" – The Persuasions (Note: "Looking for an Echo" includes uncredited interpolations of "For Sentimental Reasons".)
5. "Get Away Jordan" – Take 6
6. "Something Within Me" – Take 6 †
7. "Flat Tire" – Rockapella †
8. "Under the Boardwalk" – Rockapella and True Image
9. "Higher and Higher" – The Mint Juleps
10. "Phansi em Godini (Down in the Mines)" – Ladysmith Black Mambazo
11. "The Lion Sleeps Tonight" – Ladysmith Black Mambazo and The Mint Juleps (Note: "The Lion Sleeps Tonight" is shown on screen as "Mbube"; it combines elements of both versions of the song.)
12. "I'm Going Home on the Morning Train" – The Persuasions †
13. "Gold Mine" – Take 6 †
14. "Trickle, Trickle" – True Image †
15. "Yes We Can Can" – True Image (Note: "Trickle, Trickle" and "Yes We Can Can" are performed together as a medley.) †
16. "I Want to Live Easy" – The Mint Juleps
17. "Set Me Free" – The Mint Juleps †
18. "N'kosi Sikeleli Afrika (God Bless Africa)" – Ladysmith Black Mambazo
19. "Pretty Woman" – Rockapella †
20. "Up on the Roof" – The Persuasions
21. "Pass On the Love" – The Persuasions

† indicates songs omitted from the soundtrack.

=== Soundtrack ===
Spike & Co.: Do It a Cappella soundtrack track listing
No.	Title	Performers	Length
1.	"I Need You"	True Image	1:57
2.	"Don't Let Your Heart"	The Mint Juleps	2:38
3.	"Zombie Jamboree"	Rockapella	3:00
4.	"Looking for an Echo"	The Persuasions	4:19
5.	"Phansi em Godini (Down in the Mines)"	Ladysmith Black Mambazo	5:11
6.	"I Want to Live Easy"	The Mint Juleps	2:48
7.	"Under the Boardwalk"	Rockapella and True Image	3:07
8.	"Up on the Roof"	The Persuasions	2:56
9.	"Higher and Higher"	The Mint Juleps	3:32
10.	"Get Away Jordan"	Take 6	4:29
11.	"N'kosi Sikeleli Afrika (God Bless Africa)"	Ladysmith Black Mambazo	2:58
12.	"Pass On the Love"	The Persuasions	2:51
13.	"The Lion Sleeps Tonight"	Ladysmith Black Mambazo and The Mint Juleps	4:33
Total length:			44:19
