= Bang (Rockapella album) =

Studio album by Rockapella
- Released: September 21, 2010 (digital); October 12, 2010 (physical)
- Recorded: January – September 2010
- Genres: A cappella, pop
- Length: 46:50
- Labels: Shakariki Records / PAID, Inc.
- Producers: Scott Leonard; Jeff Thacher

Rockapella chronology
Live in Japan (2004)	Bang (2010)	A Rockapella Holiday (2011)

Bang is the sixteenth overall and eleventh North American album by the a cappella group Rockapella. It is the first studio album the group has released since 2002 and marks the first recording appearance of members John K. Brown and Steven Dorian, who had joined the group in 2004 and 2010, respectively. The album consists almost entirely of original music and is also the first Rockapella album to have at least one song written by each of the five members. The album contains a special bonus fourteenth track: a cover of Vampire Weekend's "A-Punk."

== Announcement, publicity, and release ==
First announced to be in the recording stage in the group's January 2010 email newsletter, front man Scott Leonard officially announced the album to the public in an interview with San Luis Obispo's "The Tribune" in April 2010. He confirmed the tracks "Tonight", "California Sad-Eyed Girl", and "4U4Now4Life" from their live concerts would be on the album, tentatively named Bang. Starting that same month and continuing through June, Rockapella released snippets of both the raw recording and mixed versions of three songs said to be on their forthcoming album: "Nuthin' But", "Tell Me What You Want", and the title track "Bang". On June 17, 2010, the official Rockapella forum received a post from an administrator with a tentative track list of 12 songs for the album, all of which ended up on the 13-track album. Their website was then updated twice in July with videos consisting of the band members recording a small section of their respective vocal parts for "Tell Me What You Want" and "Bang" in Leonard's home recording studio; Jeff Thacher only appeared in the "Bang" video and was recording his part from his New York apartment. A similar video was released for Thacher's "Too Much" in October with a written description by him explaining why the song sounds the way it does. An August 2010 interview with Thacher stated a publicity push for the album would occur from August to early September, and the album would be released in mid-September. True to his word, Bang was released on September 21, 2010 in a solely digital format via iTunes, Amazon.com, and their website, while physical CD copies of the album became available on October 12. The CD is available in three forms through the Rockapella website:

- a Deluxe Package that came with a physical copy of the album; a digital copy with a digital booklet featuring artwork, lyrics, and credits; two bonus live tracks: "Papa Was a Rolling Stone" and "Got to Get You Into My Life;" and a 2GB microphone-shaped memory stick containing all the tracks
- a CD Package that came with a physical copy of the album as well as a digital copy and the digital booklet
- a Digital Package available from both the website and iTunes that contained a digital copy of the album and the digital booklet.

== Track listing ==
No.	Title	Writer(s)	Length
1.	"Bang"	Scott Leonard	3:15
2.	"Hard Time"	Vincent D'Annunzio	2:54
3.	"4U4Now4Life"	Scott Leonard	2:59
4.	"Tell Me What You Want"	Scott Leonard	2:51
5.	"Nuthin' But"	Scott Leonard	3:47
6.	"California Sad-Eyed Girl"	Scott Leonard	3:51
7.	"Tonight"	Scott Leonard	2:48
8.	"Shemibos"	John K. Brown	3:28
9.	"Malibu Grand-Prix"	Steven Dorian, Brandon Tracy	3:42
10.	"Too Much"	Jeff Thacher	3:35
11.	"Babygirl"	Scott Leonard	4:03
12.	"The Shortest Path"	Jeff Thacher, Craig Wilson	2:55
13.	"No Pressure"	George Baldi III, Paul Sipio	4:21
14.	"A-Punk" (bonus track)	Chris Baio, Rostam Batmanglij, Ezra Koenig, Chris Tomson	2:21

== Personnel ==
- Scott Leonard – high tenor
- Steven Dorian – tenor
- John K. Brown – tenor
- George Baldi III – bass
- Jeff Thacher – vocal percussion
