= A Rockapella Holiday =

Studio album by Rockapella
- Released: November 16, 2011
- Recorded: 2011
- Genre: A Cappella; Holiday
- Length: 40:36
- Label: Shakariki Records / PAID, Inc.
- Producer: Scott Leonard; Layne Stein

Rockapella chronology
Bang (2010)	A Rockapella Holiday (2011)	Motown & More (2013)

A Rockapella Holiday is the seventeenth overall, twelfth North American, and fifth holiday album released by the a cappella group Rockapella. The tracks consist of new songs premiered on the album and songs the group has perfected since 2003 during their holiday concerts of the same name.

== Announcement, publicity, and release ==
The album was first mentioned in an interview with Scott Leonard during the band's 2010 holiday tour, where he revealed it would include both "new and newly arranged Christmas songs." No other official news about the album was released until October 2, 2011, when Rockapella appeared on the Japanese internet show WorldNet.tv during their Japanese tour and disclosed the name of the album to be A Rockapella Holiday and that it would be released in November 2011. On November 16, 2011, Rockapella posted a picture on their official Facebook account announcing the cover art and track list for the album and that it would be available on iTunes the next day, with physical copies available by the end of the month. Rockapella's website was updated on November 17, 2011 with the album's information and made the album available in three forms:

- a Deluxe Package that comes with a physical copy of the album, a digital copy with a digital booklet featuring artwork and credits, and a 2GB microphone-shaped memory stick;
- a CD Package that comes with a physical copy of the album as well as a digital copy and the digital booklet; and
- a Digital Package available from both the website and iTunes that contains a digital copy of the album and the digital booklet.

== Track listing ==
No.	Title	Writer(s)	Length
1.	"Angels We Have Heard On High"	Traditional, Edward Shippen Barnes, James Chadwick	4:08
2.	"Christmas Don't Be Late (The Chipmunk Song)"	Ross Bagdasarian Sr. (a.k.a. David Seville)	2:58
3.	"I Have A Little Dreidel"	Mikhl Gelbart, Samuel E. Goldfarb, Samuel S. Grossman	2:19
4.	"Matunda Ya Kwanzaa"	Scott Leonard	3:03
5.	"Wonderful Christmastime"	Paul McCartney, Pyotr Ilyich Tchaikovsky	4:07
6.	"Jingle Bell Rock"	Joe Beal, Jim Boothe	1:55
7.	"Ukrainian Carol" (sic)	Mykola Leontovych	2:25
8.	"O Little Town Of Bethlehem"	Phillips Brooks, Lewis Redner	3:56
9.	"The Little Drummer Boy"	Katherine K. Davis, Henry Onorati, Harry Simeone	3:27
10.	"Christmas Altogether"	Leonard, Masahiro Ikumi	4:59
11.	"Happy Christma-Hanu-Kwanzaa Holiday"	Leonard	3:57
12.	"Auld Lang Syne"	Robert Burns, Traditional	3:22

== Personnel ==
- Scott Leonard – high tenor
- Steven Dorian – tenor
- John K. Brown – tenor
- George Baldi III – bass
- Jeff Thacher – vocal percussion
