= Barry Carl =

American voice-over actor and musician

- Born: Barry Straus Carl; April 20, 1950 (age 76); Portland, Oregon, U.S.
- Origin: Los Angeles, California, U.S.
- Genres: A cappella, classical
- Occupations: Performer, singer, voice-over actor, marriage counselor, bodyworker
- Instruments: Vocals; bass guitar; french horn
- Years active: 1988–2002 (singer); 1984–present (voice over); 2006–present (counselor)
- Labels: South Mountain Productions, Inc.; Shakariki; Amerigo; Rentrak; J-Bird; ForLife
- Formerly of: Rockapella

Barry Strauss Carl (born April 20, 1950) is an American voice-over actor and musician best known as the bass of the a cappella vocal band Rockapella while the group was house band on the PBS children's geography game show Where in the World Is Carmen Sandiego?. He was a member of Rockapella from 1988 until he left the group in 2002. Carl is known for his signature deep voice, which he used during his years with the band to create an almost instrumental sounding bass.

As a voice-over artist, Carl has done hundreds of television and radio commercials for such companies as Taco Bell, Charmin, Mounds/Almond Joy, Doritos, and Volkswagen; promos for Syfy, Comedy Central, Nickelodeon, The Discovery Channel, and PBS; theatrical trailers; industrial narrations; books on tape; public service announcements; internet commercials; and voices for animated characters in anime, video games, and commercials.

== Early life ==
Born in Portland, Oregon to a father who was a jazz musician and a mother who was an artist focusing mostly on sculpting, Carl's parents moved to Los Angeles, where he grew up, before he was 2 years old. In 1958, at age 8, Carl began to play the tenor saxophone, but stopped a year later and switched to the French horn at age 10. He won many awards and competitions for his horn playing including the Los Angeles Music Guild Award (1963), the First Los Angeles Horn Club Award (1965), and the Coleman Awards twice (1966, 1967). It also brought him many opportunities; Carl played with every pro and semipro ensemble in Los Angeles, played the Strauss' Horn Concerto No. 1 at his high school graduation, was the principal horn in the American youth symphony under Mehli Mehta as well as an extra horn with the Los Angeles Philharmonic, the Cleveland Orchestra, and the American Ballet Theatre, and spent three summers on scholarship at the Music Academy of the West in Montecito under Maurice Abravanel, where he performed Mozart's Sinfonia Concertante for Wind Quartet and Orchestra, Robert Schumann's Konzertstück for Four Horns and Orchestra, Antonín Dvořák's Serenade for Wind Instruments, and Mozart's Serenade No. 10 for Winds.

Carl won a scholarship to the Juilliard School in 1966 at age 16, the youngest hornist ever admitted to the school on scholarship at the time, but waited until he graduated from Ulysses S. Grant High School in 1968 to move to New York and attend the school. He studied with Rainier DeIntinis, who was the 3rd chair hornist in the New York Philharmonic while he taught. Carl earned two degrees from Juilliard, a Bachelor of Music in 1972 and a Master of Music in 1973, and played in the Juilliard Orchestra, many Broadway shows, the Merce Cunningham Dance Company, and three seasons with the New Jersey Symphony Orchestra during his years there. He quit playing the horn at age 28 to further pursue his passion for singing.

== Singing ==
Carl began studying voice in 1975 and went back to Juilliard a year later at age 26 as a singer in their American Opera Center (AOC) professional program. He studied with Nina Hinson, Raymond Buckingham, Dan Merriman, Armen Boyajian, Robin M. Williams, and briefly with Richard Torigi while at the AOC, which ended after just a few lessons when he told Carl, "You have a very ugly voice and should quit." He spent three summers at the Aspen Music Festival, where he sang in his first opera and made his solo debut as the Basso Profundo soloist in the world premiere of Krzysztof Penderecki's Utrenja II for Five Soloists, Boy's Choir, Chorus, and Orchestra. After a summer apprenticeship at the Central City Opera in Central City, Colorado in 1978, Carl joined the New York City Opera at age 28 for four seasons, where he sang as chorister and made his solo debut there in the dual roles of Alcindoro and Benoît in La Bohème. For several years afterward, he continued to sing with orchestras such as the Juilliard Orchestra, the New York Philharmonic, and the American Symphony Orchestra; with many small ensembles such as Vocal Jazz, Inc., the Cathedral Singers at the Cathedral of St. John the Divine, and the New York Choral Soloists; in regional opera playing roles such as Méphistophélès in Faust, Sarastro in Die Zauberflöte, Zaccaria in Nabucco, Seneca in L'incoronazione di Poppea, and Theseus in A Midsummer Night's Dream; and did musical and regional theater.

=== Rockapella ===
In the spring of 1988, while sitting in the Pier 72 Diner on 72nd Street and West End Avenue in New York City, Carl read an ad for a bass in an a cappella group called Rockapella in Backstage. He answered the ad and auditioned for Sean Altman and Elliott Kerman, but did not hear back from them for two months. That summer, while Carl worked with the Minnesota Opera, Altman and Kerman asked him to be in the group and sent him a stack of music to learn. Upon receiving and looking over the music, Carl decided he didn't want to sing barbershop tunes and Christmas songs, so he sent the music back and told the pair he had changed his mind about taking the position. Altman then called Carl and persuaded him to try it, asserting that it would be a minimal time commitment. He was a member of Rockapella for 14 years, two years longer than Altman's own membership. Carl's first gig with Rockapella was singing the "Star Spangled Banner" at a New York Rangers game at Madison Square Garden, which the group had been hired to do for 12 games; the quartet was booed throughout the entire song and relieved of their obligation to sing at the next 11 games. Upon looking back at the experience, both Carl and Altman have stated the negative feedback was because of their slow arrangement of the national anthem. Over the 14 years he spent with the band, Carl wrote five songs on the 15 CDs he appears on with Rockapella: "Give" (with Masahiro Ikumi and Scott Leonard), "Island Christmas" (Bash!), "Fat Jack & Bonefish Joe" (with Lisa S. Johnson), "Quiet Sensation" (Vocobeat), and "Bored & Stroked" (Out Cold); arranged the group's cover of "Love Me Tender" (Lucky Seven); and performed numerous bass solos for songs both on and not included in Rockapella's albums. He recorded many of his parts for these albums in his recording studio The BassMint, "a luxurious pro studio on the green banks of the Hackensack River" as Carl describes it.

In late 2002, Carl decided to retire from Rockapella to pursue other opportunities; his last concert with the group was on July 14, 2002, in Burbank, California at the Starlight Bowl, but appeared as the principal bass singer on the group's album Smilin', which was released a month later. Carl has, however, continued to work with music. He released a solo CD in 2004 titled The SoLow Project, which contains 20 songs split into four sections of Negro spirituals, sea chanties, a collection of songs by Jacques Ibert, and a song cycle by Modest Mussorgsky. He also appeared on movie soundtracks as an ensemble singer for such films as Corpse Bride and Nine; in 2007 he appeared in the independent movie The Wedding Weekend as a tough guy in prison who likes to sing. In the fall of 2009, Carl filmed a scene for the Will Ferrell movie The Other Guys, released on August 6, 2010, in which he is an a cappella singer in a bar. Since 2008 Carl has gotten back together with Steve Keyes, Kerman, and Altman on three occasions, billing themselves as XRP. This regrouping of the 1988–1991 line up of Rockapella was originally scheduled to occur only twice: once as a practice gig on July 26, 2008, and a second time at the 2008 A Cappellastock in Ogden, Utah on August 23. However, XRP got together for a third show on April 17, 2009, and sang a song written by Carl and Altman on the Schoolhouse Rock!: Earth Rock soundtrack called "You Oughta Be Savin' Water"; Carl is also one of the singers on another Altman song on the same album titled "Save the Ocean". In addition to singing with old friends at various gigs, Carl sings in a pro chorus with the New York Philharmonic and the American Symphony Orchestra from time to time, and every now and then concertizes with Rockland Vocal Arts, a small ensemble of singers. Carl also privately teaches a limited number of vocal students and coaches vocal groups.

== Voice-over artist ==
Starting in 1984, Carl has done voice over work for many forms of media. He started out freelance for about five years, and then signed on with William Morris Agency for ten years. Since then he has been with Abrams Artists Agency. At the 2007 Promax Awards, two of Carl's SciFi Channel promos won International Gold Medals. For many years he was the voice of the papa bear in the Charmin television ads; Carl's voice has also been used as the voice for the following various animated animals and objects: bear, pig, clam, duck, cockroach, horse, penguin, giraffe, moose, whale, shark, bass (fish), Sasquatch, water droplet, water jug, a jug of Kool-Aid, a toilet, a germ, a recycling bin, and an echo in a Pepsi commercial. In addition to his aforementioned private singing lessons, Carl teaches voice-over technique.

Carl started playing the bass guitar in 1986, was the bassist on The SoLow Project, and continues to play today. He also writes stories and articles for various publications, is currently co-producing TV show pilots and concepts in partnership with Hilton Media, is a frequent judge at a cappella competitions such as the International Championship of Collegiate A Cappella and the Harmony Sweeps Finals, and rides a 2016 Kawasaki Concours he calls "The Gray Ghost". He also works as a Certified Core Energetics Practitioner (CCEP) in Rockland County, NY.

== Filmography ==
Year	Title	Role	Notes
1979	Live from Lincoln Center	Man	1 episode
1991–1995	Where in the World Is Carmen Sandiego?	Mrs. Pumpkinclanger, Moosey, Buzz	These were alternate roles that Carl played in addition to being the bass player in Rockapella for the show.
2007	Security	Narrator	Short film
2009–2010	Important Things with Demetri Martin	Announcer/Voiceover Role	6 episodes
2016	What Would You Do?	Bystander	1 episode

== Video games ==
Year	Title	Role	Notes
2003	Manhunt	Ramirez	Voice part
2007	Manhunt 2	SWAT	

== Discography ==
=== Solo ===
==== CDs ====
Release Date	Album	Label
2004	The SoLow Project	South Mountain Productions, Inc.
2009	Going All The Way – The Heart and Soul of the Exceptional Marriage (spoken word album)	Exceptional Marriage

==== Guest appearance/various releases ====
Release Date	Album	Song
2013	The Cigar Chronicles – Liberty N' Justice	"Cupids Gonna Bleed"
2009	Schoolhouse Rock!: Earth	"You Oughta Be Savin' Water" "Save the Ocean" "Report from the North Pole"
2002	Zig Zag – Tom Chapin	"Loose Tooth"
2001	Feeding the Wheel – Jordan Rudess	"The Voice"
1998	It's Fun To Steal – Mono Puff	"Night Security"
1992	Duophonic – Charles & Eddie	"Would I Lie to You?"

==== Soundtracks and appearances ====
Release Date	Album	Role
2010	The Other Guys	Ensemble singer
2009	Nine	Ensemble singer
2006	The Wedding Weekend	Scary Prison Guy – "Working in the Coal Mine"
2005	Corpse Bride	Ensemble singer – "The Wedding Song"
2004	The Stepford Wives	
2000	Mission to Mars	
1997	Happily Ever After: Fairy Tales for Every Child (Episode: Mother Goose: A Rappin' and Rhymin' Special)	Member of the Five Little Piggies
1996	Joe's Apartment	Member of the Roach Chorus
1994	The Hudsucker Proxy	

=== With Rockapella ===
==== Domestic releases ====
Release Date	Album	Line-up	Label
August 2002	Smilin'	Leonard, Wright, Kerman, Carl, Baldi, Thacher	Amerigo Records; Re-released on Shakariki Records in 2004
March 2001	In Concert	Leonard, Wright, Kerman, Carl, Thacher	J-Bird Records; Re-released on Shakariki Records in 2004
October 2000	Christmas	Leonard, Wright, Kerman, Carl, Thacher	J-Bird Records; Re-released on Shakariki Records in 2004
March 2000	2	Leonard, Wright, Kerman, Carl, Thacher	J-Bird Records; Re-released on Shakariki Records in 2004
February 1999	Don't Tell Me You Do	Leonard, Wright, Kerman, Carl, Thacher	J-Bird Records; Re-released on Shakariki Records in 2004
Mid-1997	Rockapella	Leonard, Wright, Kerman, Carl, Thacher	Independent
Mid-1996	Lucky Seven	Leonard, Altman, Kerman, Carl, Thacher	Independent
Mid-1995	Primer	Leonard, Altman, Kerman, Carl, Thacher	Independent

==== International releases ====
Year	Album	Line-up	Label
2002	In Concert	Leonard, Wright, Kerman, Carl, Thacher	Rentrak Records
November 2001	Christmas	Leonard, Wright, Kerman, Carl, Thacher	Rentrak Records
November 1996	Lucky Seven: Memories And Dreams	Leonard, Altman, Kerman, Carl, Thacher	ForLife Records
November 1995	Best Fest	Leonard, Altman, Kerman, Carl, Thacher	ForLife Records
November 1994	Out Cold	Leonard, Altman, Kerman, Carl, Thacher	ForLife Records
April 1994	Vocobeat	Leonard, Altman, Kerman, Carl, Thacher	ForLife Records
December 1992	Bash!	Leonard, Altman, Kerman, Carl	ForLife Records
May 1992	From N.Y.	Leonard, Altman, Kerman, Carl	ForLife Records
May 1992	To N.Y.	Leonard, Altman, Kerman, Carl	ForLife Records

==== Compilations ====
Release Date	Album	Line-up	Label
September 2002	Best A Cappella	Leonard, Altman, Kerman, Carl, Thacher	ForLife Records
2002	More Than Ever	Leonard, Wright, Kerman, Carl, Thacher	Rentrak Records

==== Various releases ====
Year	Album	Line-up	Song
2007	Hokie Nation: An A Cappella Tribute	Leonard, Wright, Kerman, Carl, Thacher	"I'll Hear Your Voice"
2000	Mark and Brian: Little Drummer Boys	Leonard, Wright, Kerman, Carl, Thacher	"Silver Bells" (Live performance)
2000	A Cappella Christmas Party	Leonard, Altman, Kerman, Carl	"Hold Out For Christmas"
1999	Revival – Sam Harris	Leonard, Wright, Kerman, Carl, Thacher	"A Change in My Life" (Background vocals)
1996	Voices Only: A Cappella Originals	Leonard, Altman, Kerman, Carl, Thacher	"Bed Of Nails"
1993	Carmen Sandiego: Out of This World	Leonard, Altman, Kerman, Carl, Thacher	"Big Wet Rag"
1993	Put On Your Green Shoes	Leonard, Altman, Kerman, Carl	"Light of the Sun" w/Richie Havens
1993	Muppet Beach Party	Leonard, Altman, Kerman, Carl	"PapaOomMowMow"
1992	Where in the World Is Carmen Sandiego?	Leonard, Altman, Kerman, Carl, Yazbek	"Capital" "Everything To Me" "My Home" "Let's Get Away From It All" "Indiana" "Where in the World Is Carmen Sandiego?"
1992	Modern A Cappella	Leonard, Altman, Kerman, Carl	"Zombie Jamboree"
1991	Zappa's Universe	Leonard, Altman, Kerman, Carl	"Elvis Has Left The Building" "Heavenly Bank Account"
1990	Spike Lee & Company: Do It A Cappella	Keyes, Altman, Kerman, Carl	"Zombie Jamboree" "Under The Boardwalk" (with True Image)
