= To N.Y. =

Studio album by Rockapella
- Released: May 21, 1992
- Genre: pop; a cappella
- Length: 47:21
- Label: For Life
- Producer: Masahiro Ikumi; Rockapella

Rockapella chronology
| To N.Y. (1992) | From N.Y. (1992) |

Singles from To N.Y.
- 1. "Tokyo Yo-Yo" Released: June 19, 1992

To N.Y. is the debut studio album by the a cappella group Rockapella, released through For Life Music on May 21, 1992. The album features English-language covers of Japanese pop songs.

== Track listing ==
All English lyrics are written by Ralph McCarthy.

| No. | Title | Lyrics | Music | Original artist(s) | Length |
|---|---|---|---|---|---|
| 1. | "Ride on Time" | Tatsuro Yamashita | Yamashita | Tatsuro Yamashita | 4:15 |
| 2. | "Candy" | Takashi Matsumoto | Shinji Harada | Shinji Harada | 3:38 |
| 3. | "Diamonds" | Kanako Nakayama | Kaori Okui | Princess Princess | 5:26 |
| 4. | "Funky Monkey Baby" | George Ōkura | Eikichi Yazawa | Carol | 3:46 |
| 5. | "Ellie My Love" | Keisuke Kuwata | Kuwata | Keisuke Kuwata | 4:06 |
| 6. | "Runaway" | Reiko Yukawa | Tadao Inque | Chanels | 2:51 |
| 7. | "Make It a Slow Boogie" | Matsumoto | Yoshitaka Minami | | 2:17 |
| 8. | "No No Boy" | Shōchi Tanabe | Hiroshi Kamayatsu | Hiroshi Kamayatsu | 3:19 |
| 9. | "Won't Be Long" | McCarthy | McCarthy | | 4:45 |
| 10. | "Riverside Hotel" | Yōsui Inoue | Inoue | Yōsui Inoue | 3:54 |
| 11. | "Olivia (I'm Listening)" | Amii Ozaki | Ozaki | Amii Ozaki | 4:57 |
| 12. | "Tokyo Yo-Yo" (Bonus Track) | McCarthy | Masahiro Ikumi | | 4:07 |

== Personnel ==
- Scott Leonard – high tenor
- Sean Altman – tenor
- Elliott Kerman – baritone
- Barry Carl – bass

=== Special appearances ===
- Jacwelyn Carl – "Won't Be Long"
- Lisa Leonard – "No No Boy"
