= George Baldi III =

- Born: George William Baldi III; August 29, 1970 (age 55); Philadelphia, Pennsylvania, US
- Genres: A cappella
- Occupations: Performer, singer
- Instrument: Vocals
- Years active: 1994–present (performer); 2002–present (band)
- Labels: Shakariki Records / PAID, Inc. Amerigo Records
- Formerly of: Rockapella
- Website: www.rockapella.com

George William Baldi III (born August 29, 1970) is an American singer best known as the bass singer of the a cappella singing group Rockapella from 2002 to 2014, and then had a second stint with the group from 2022 to 2023, becoming a supporting member after each departure.

== Early life ==
Baldi grew up in Philadelphia. He discovered his musical and performing talents at a young age by singing and dancing in the jam sessions his family would have at his aunt's house after having Sunday dinner at his grandmother's. Baldi attended the Philadelphia High School for the Creative and Performing Arts, where he majored in vocal music. While a student at CAPA, Baldi was a founding member of Unique Attraction, a group that later evolved into Boyz II Men. Baldi left Unique Attraction upon graduating in 1988, at which time he continued his musical education at Morris Brown College as a vocal performance major, receiving a BA in Music in 1993.

== Musical career ==
Baldi auditioned for a job at Walt Disney World after graduating from college, and in 1994 began performing in The Voices of Liberty and then American Vybe, a cappella groups in The American Adventure pavilion at Epcot. Then, in 2001, Baldi auditioned with a group of guys for a job at Universal Studios Japan located in Osaka. He was trying to help them get the job, but was the only person chosen out of the group and was offered a position in the Beetlejuice Rock and Roll show as Frankenstein. The job started on March 31, 2001, the park's opening date, and Baldi moved to Japan for it, continuing to work and live there for a year, eventually obtaining the position of park vocal coach in addition to his performing duties.

== Rockapella ==
When bassist Barry Carl decided to retire from the group to pursue other opportunities in 2002, Rockapella was left without a bass singer and needed to find a new one. The group was informed by a mutual friend that a "true bass" could be found in Baldi, but he was in Japan at the time. They sent him an email asking if he would come back to the US and audition for the group. He was hired for the job in May 2002 and began to learn the group's song setlist. Baldi recorded his parts for Smilin', the group's 2002 summer album that served as a transition between Carl and Baldi singing bass, and his first concert as a member of Rockapella was on August 1, 2002, in Hartford, Connecticut at the East Hartford Town Green. Baldi's soft, smooth, resonant bass is a great contrast to Carl's, which seemed to rumble up from the depths of the earth, and his addition to the band started the evolution of Rockapella to their current R&B-based sound, or "the new sound of Rockapella" as the group refers to it as. He has sung many bass solos for Rockapella, taking over some of Carl's previous solos and singing his own unique solos in new original and cover music the group has included in their setlist over the years. Baldi's vocal range is vast, transitioning from low bass rumbling to high pitched belting with ease. In 2014, Baldi stepped aside from performing full-time with Rockapella and was replaced by Ryan Chappelle. Baldi remained as a supporting member from that point on. In 2022, after bass Bryant Vance left Rockapella, Baldi returned to the group. However, by mid-2023, he left the group again and was replaced by Armand Hutton. Despite his second departure, he remains a supporting member of the group and a substitute/special guest bass player.

== Personal life ==
When not touring the world with Rockapella, Baldi recreationally rides bicycles; he performs at the Walt Disney World Resort in the Festival of the Lion King playing the role of Kiume, a role he originated when the show first opened. Baldi currently lives in Florida, where he is close to his daughter DeAhna Zhane Baldi (b. 1994).

== Discography ==
=== Domestic releases ===
Release Date	Album	Line-up	Label
November 2011	A Rockapella Holiday	Leonard, Dorian, Brown, Baldi, Thacher	Shakariki Records / PAID, Inc.
September 2010	Bang	Leonard, Dorian, Brown, Baldi, Thacher	Shakariki Records / PAID, Inc.
June 2004	Live in Japan	Leonard, Wright, Kerman, Baldi, Thacher	Shakariki Records
November 2002	Comfort & Joy	Leonard, Wright, Kerman, Baldi, Thacher	Amerigo Records; Re-released on Shakariki Records in 2004
August 2002	Smilin'	Leonard, Wright, Kerman, Carl, Baldi, Thacher	Amerigo Records; Re-released on Shakariki Records in 2004

=== Unaffiliated releases ===
Year	Album	Line-up	Label
Summer 2005	Live at Duo Music Exchange	Leonard, Wright, Kerman, Baldi, Thacher	Duo Records

=== Various releases ===
Year	Album	Line-up	Song
2002	20 Christmas Stars, Vol. IV	Leonard, Wright, Kerman, Baldi, Thacher	"Merry Christmas Darling"
