= Smilin' =

Studio album by Rockapella
- Released: August 13, 2002
- Genre: A Cappella
- Length: 39:50
- Label: Amerigo Records; Shakariki Records
- Producer: Scott Leonard

Rockapella chronology
More Than Ever (2001)	Smilin' (2002)	Best A Cappella (2002)

Singles from Smilin'
- 1. "Here Comes The Sun" Released: August 2002

Smilin' is the thirteenth overall and eighth North American album by the a cappella group Rockapella. It is legendary bass Barry Carl's last album as a member of the group and the first appearance of Carl's successor, George Baldi III. It was re-released on Shakariki Records in 2004.

== Track listing ==
No.	Title	Writer(s)	Length
1.	"Shambala" (Additional vocals by Sean Altman and George Baldi III)	Daniel Moore	2:47
2.	"Flamingo Sing"	Scott Leonard	3:46
3.	"Here Comes the Sun" (Bass solely by George Baldi III)	George Harrison	2:45
4.	"Off My Mind" (Additional vocals by George Baldi III)	Scott Leonard	3:51
5.	"Summertime Blues"	Eddie Cochran, Jerry Capehart	3:41
6.	"Lazy River"	Sidney Arodin, Hoagy Carmichael	3:13
7.	"Smile in My Heart" (Additional vocals by George Baldi III)	Scott Leonard	3:27
8.	"Dance with Me" (Additional vocals by George Baldi III)	John Hall, Johanna Hall	2:44
9.	"No Doubt At All"	Elliott Kerman	2:42
10.	"Millennial Lady"	Scott Leonard	4:03
11.	"Jenny Come Away"	Scott Leonard	3:02
12.	"Surfin' Safari"	Brian Wilson, Mike Love	3:49

== Personnel ==
- Scott Leonard – high tenor
- Kevin Wright – tenor
- Elliott Kerman – baritone
- Barry Carl – bass
- George Baldi III – bass
- Jeff Thacher – vocal percussion

=== Special appearances ===
- Sean Altman - "Shambala"
- Eli Kerman – "Summertime Blues", "No Doubt At All"
- Natalie Leonard – "Millennial Lady"
