= The Big Con (video game) =

2021 video game

- Developer: Mighty Yell
- Publisher: Skybound Games
- Director: Dave Proctor
- Producer: Yash Kulkarni
- Designer: Jill Murray
- Programmers: George Degenkamp; Josh Capelli
- Artist: Saffron Aurora
- Writer: Dave Proctor
- Composer: Dan Rodrigues
- Platforms: Windows; Xbox One; Xbox Series X/S; Nintendo Switch; PlayStation 4; PlayStation 5
- Release: Windows, Xbox One, Xbox Series X/S; August 31, 2021; Switch; June 1, 2022; PS4, PS5; August 31, 2023
- Genre: Adventure
- Mode: Single-player

The Big Con is an adventure game developed by Mighty Yell and published by Skybound Games. It was released for Windows, Xbox One, and Xbox Series X/S on August 31, 2021. A Nintendo Switch version was released on June 1, 2022. Versions for PlayStation 4 and PlayStation 5 were released on August 31, 2023. Set in the 1990s, the game follows Ali, a teenager who works at a video rental store owned by Linda, her mother. After learning that her mother owes $97,342.18 to loan sharks, she meets Ted, a con artist. They travel across the United States, earning money to save Linda's store. The Windows version of The Big Con received favorable reviews, while the Xbox Series X/S version received mixed reviews.

== Gameplay ==
Ali pickpocketing a NPC. To successfully pickpocket the NPC, the pink needle has to be stopped in the purple zone.

The Big Con is an adventure game where the player controls Ali, a teenager who has to raise money to save her mother's video rental store. In each location, the player has to steal a certain amount of money. Once the threshold is reached, they can continue to explore, or leave the area by talking to Ted. Ali can earn money by pickpocketing non-player characters (NPCs). Each NPC has an indicator that shows the amount of the cash that they hold. To successfully pickpocket a character, the player will have to play a minigame where they must stop a needle in a target area. If Ali fails to pickpocket a NPC, she will have to find another disguise before attempting to pickpocket them again. If she fails three separate times, she will have to rewind VHS tapes at a video rental store. Ali will earn back lost money after completing this task. Ali can also earn money by collecting items and selling them to a pawnbroker. Ali can additionally accept sidequests from NPCs.

== Development and release ==
The Big Con was developed by Toronto-based developer Mighty Yell. The developers set the game in the 1990s to make the plot "easier to believe", and allow for a "bright and colorful" palette. Saffron Aurora, the game's artist, used cartoons such as The Simpsons, Hey Arnold!, and Doug to form the game's art style. Ali is voiced by Erika Ishii, and Rad Ghost is voiced by Dave Fennoy.

The team won $50,000 at the 2018 Gaming Pitch Competition at EGLX. The Big Con was featured at PAX West 2019 and at PAX East 2020. A teaser trailer was also released in 2020. In March 2021, the game was shown off at the ID@Xbox showcase. In May, Skybound Games partnered with Mighty Yell to publish the game. In June, Melissa Joan Hart presented the game in at Tribeca Festival. The game's demo was available during the Steam Next Fest.

The Big Con's theme song was performed by Rockapella, and the soundtrack was composed by Dan Rodrigues. The game was announced for PC, Xbox One, and Xbox Series X/S on May 12. It was scheduled to release that summer. The game's August 31 release date was announced in July. Mighty Yell held a contest to choose a voice actor for a non-player character in the game. The winner would receive a copy of the game and a T-shirt. The Big Con's demo was playable at PAX East 2022. A Nintendo Switch version titled The Big Con: Grift of the Year Edition was released on June 1, 2022. The Big Con: Grift of the Year Edition was also released for Xbox One, Xbox Series X/S, and PC.

== Reception ==
Reception

Aggregate score
Aggregator	Score
Metacritic	PC: 77/100 (Note: Score based on 13 reviews.); XSX: 74/100 (Note: Score based on 9 reviews.)

Review scores
Publication	Score
Eurogamer	Recommended
GameSpot	7/10
Hardcore Gamer	3.5/5
Nintendo World Report	8.5/10
NME	4/5
Shacknews	7/10
Windows Central	4/5

The Big Con received generally favorable reviews, according to review aggregator Metacritic.

GameSpot's Andrew King praised the "vibrant" art style and complemented the game's music. King felt that the pickpocketing minigame was "confusing" and thought that the story was "familiar". Kyle LeClair from Hardcore Gamer felt that the game's con jobs provided "clever" puzzles and "fun" gameplay. Miles Dompier from Windows Central called the game's story "touching" and "relatable", but felt that the gameplay loop became repetitive. Dompier recommended The Big Con for fans of adventure games.

Eurogamer recommended The Big Con as an "endearing adventure". Miri Teixeira from NME praised the "immersive" levels, but criticized the controls. Nintendo World Report's Neal Ronaghan wrote that The Big Con was a "stylish" game with a "good balance". Ozzie Meija from Shacknews called the game "intriguing" and described Ali as a "fun" character. He believed that the dialogue was "hit-and-miss" and felt that the pickpocketing mechanic became repetitive.

=== Nominations ===
The Big Con received an honorable mention for the Excellence in Narrative award at the Independent Games Festival. At the Canadian Game Awards, the game was nominated for Best Indie Game and Best Score/Soundtrack. The game received a nomination for Best Audio for an Indie Game at the 2022 Game Audio Network Guild Awards, and received an honorable mention at the A MAZE. Awards.

Year	Award	Category	Result	Ref.
2022	Canadian Game Awards	Best Indie Game	Nominated	
2022	Canadian Game Awards	Best Score/Soundtrack	Nominated	
2022	Game Audio Network Guild Awards	Best Audio for an Indie Game	Nominated	
