= Bash! (Rockapella album) =

Studio album by Rockapella
- Released: December 16, 1992
- Genre: A Cappella
- Length: 44:46
- Language: English
- Label: ForLife Records
- Producer: Masahiro Ikumi; Billy Straus; Rockapella

Rockapella chronology
From N.Y. (1992)	Bash! (1992)	Vocobeat (1994)

Bash! is the third studio album and the first holiday album from the a cappella group Rockapella.

== Track listing ==
No.	Title	Writer(s)	Length
1.	"We Got a Happy Holiday"	Sean Altman	3:23
2.	"Hula Holiday"	Scott Leonard	3:47
3.	"You're My Christmas"	Sean Altman	3:02
4.	"Give"	Scott Leonard, Barry Carl, Masahiro Ikumi	4:15
5.	"Holiday Groove"	Elliott Kerman	2:41
6.	"Hold Out for Christmas"	Scott Leonard	4:08
7.	"Home for the Holidays"	Robert Allen, Al Stillman	3:47
8.	"Frosty the Snowman/Santa Claus Is Comin' to Town"	Jack Rollins, Steve Nelson/J.F. Coots, Haven Gillespie	1:49
9.	"Christmas Love"	Ralph McCarthy, Masahiro Ikumi	4:27
10.	"Island Christmas"	Barry Carl	4:03
11.	"Presents"	Sean Altman	3:42
12.	"Silver Bells"	Jay Livingston, Ray Evans	3:00
13.	"White Christmas"	Irving Berlin	2:42

== Personnel ==
- Scott Leonard – high tenor
- Sean Altman – tenor
- Elliott Kerman – baritone
- Barry Carl – bass

=== Special appearances ===
- Lisa Leonard – "Holiday Groove"
