= Carmen Sandiego: To Steal or Not to Steal =

2020 animation/interactive fiction film

- Poster of the Netflix special
- Directed by: Jos Humphrey
- Written by: Greg Ernstrom; Becky Tinker
- Story by: Duane Capizzi; May Chan; Sam Nisson; Susan O’Connor
- Produced by: Brian Hulme
- Starring: Gina Rodriguez; Finn Wolfhard
- Production companies: WildBrain Studios; HMH Productions; I Can & I Will Productions
- Distributed by: Netflix
- Release date: March 10, 2020
- Running time: 31 minutes
- Countries: Canada; United States
- Language: English

Carmen Sandiego: To Steal or Not to Steal is a 2020 animated interactive television special directed by Jos Humphrey and co-directed by Kenny Park and Mike West, written by Duane Capizzi, May Chan, Sam Nisson, Susan O’Connor, Greg Ernstrom & Becky Tinker and starring Gina Rodriguez and Finn Wolfhard. It is part of the 2019 Netflix series Carmen Sandiego. The film was removed from Netflix on December 1, 2024.

== Plot ==
While attempting to steal from a V.I.L.E. building in Shanghai, Carmen learns that her friends, Zack and Ivy, have been kidnapped by V.I.L.E., and The Faculty threaten to brainwash them into becoming V.I.L.E. henchmen unless Carmen steals some objects for them. Carmen receives a tip from Player that Zack and Ivy are being held captive in a moving van outside the building. If Carmen attempts to rescue Zack and Ivy from the van, she discovers it was a ploy and Zack and Ivy are brainwashed. The Chief appears onscreen and she forces the viewer to go back and agree to steal for V.I.L.E. in order to continue the episode.

For the first task, Coach Brunt tells Carmen to steal a soldier from the Terracotta Army in Xi'an, China. While Carmen is outside the dig site, she runs into Tigress, who has been sent to aid Carmen in the mission. They enter an underground tunnel and fall into a booby trap, which Carmen escapes and has the choice of saving Tigress from the trap or leaving her in the pit. Carmen enters the chamber to steal a terracotta statue, which is picked up by The Cleaners in a helicopter just as two guards enter the chamber. If Carmen hitches a ride into the helicopter, the guards grab her feet after she has climbed up the statue and the combined weight causes the statue to fall and break, angering Coach Brunt and leading to Zack and Ivy's brainwashing. If Carmen instead hides among the statues, she eludes the guards and escapes from the chamber.

Dr. Saira Bellum and Countess Cleo vie to direct Carmen's next task. Carmen is allowed to choose who she steals for first, but not before being allowed to speak to Zack and Ivy and taking a photo of them in their prison. She sends the photo to Player, who uses it to find out where their location is.

Cleo sends Carmen to Monte Carlo, Monaco to make off with some expensive Beluga caviar from a charity gala. At the event, where Mime Bomb is performing, Carmen locates A.C.M.E. Agent Julia Argent, who had been tipped off about the stolen terracotta warrior and V.I.L.E.'s plan to steal the eggs. Carmen can either trust Julia with the truth that she is stealing for V.I.L.E. or lock her on the roof of the building while she steals the caviar. She then sees that the waiters are about to plate the caviar and is given the option to sneak the caviar out and escape with it later or to grab all the caviar tins and immediately escape with them. If Carmen decides to stash the eggs, she is interrupted by Mime Bomb choking on the hors d'oeuvres. She saves him with the Heimlich maneuver, but when she enters the kitchen, the eggs have already been removed from their tins. She still escapes with them, but Cleo declares Carmen to have failed since the caviar was exposed and will only last for one day, and Zack and Ivy are brainwashed. If Carmen decides instead to grab the cart of tins and dash out with them, she successfully flies out of the gala with the caviar fresh.

Dr. Bellum instructs Carmen to travel to Hell Creek, Montana to steal a Tyrannosaurus rex bone with tissue still intact. Once Carmen arrives and locates the bone, she can choose to either recruit El Topo or Le Chevre to help her escape. Once inside the museum where the bone is kept, she discovers that A.C.M.E. agents have surrounded the building and will be entering the museum in a moment. If Carmen attempts to hide from the A.C.M.E Agents and wait for the coast to be clear, she will try to hide inside a model dinosaur, but it will collapse from Carmen's weight and Carmen is forced to flee without the bone, resulting in the bone likely being moved from the museum by the A.C.M.E. agents and Zack and Ivy being brainwashed. If Carmen makes a run for the lab to steal the bone, she escapes through the air duct and secures the bone for Dr. Bellum with El Topo or Le Chevre helping her make a hasty escape from the museum.

After the second task, Carmen checks in with Zack and Ivy again and takes another photo. She and Player deduce that Zack and Ivy are being held within the Arctic Circle. Carmen can choose to either attempt to rescue Zack and Ivy or proceed with V.I.L.E.'s third task. If Carmen chooses to rescue Zack and Ivy early, Tigress helps her into the facility where they are held if Carmen saved her from the pit booby trap. Carmen saves Zack and Ivy, but V.I.L.E. keeps the items that she stole for them. If Carmen left Tigress to find her own way out of the pit, Tigress refuses to let Carmen into the facility and presses the emergency lock and shut down button and Carmen is forced to take a longer route which leads to Zack and Ivy being brainwashed. They initially appear fine and go out for ice cream with Carmen, but then are ordered to capture her when V.I.L.E. activates their brainwashing, forcing the viewer to start the whole story over or to help Tigress instead.

If Carmen takes up both Cleo and Bellum's tasks, V.I.L.E. arranges for Carmen to board a ferry to the Île d'Oléron, where Zack and Ivy have been relocated in exchange for the items she stole. At the airport, she runs into Julia and asks for her help. If Carmen had locked Julia on the roof in Monaco, Julia refuses to help and Carmen is forced to rescue her friends all by herself. V.I.L.E. captures Carmen when she gets off the ferry and brainwash her along with Zack and Ivy, which Carmen had surmised was their plan all along, and the faculty also keep and use the stolen items for their own nefarious purposes, causing the viewer to start over the story or to trust Julia. If Carmen had trusted Julia, she agrees to pose as Carmen on the ferry while the real Carmen rescues Zack and Ivy and escapes with them in the same helicopter that the terracotta warrior was taken in. Carmen delivers the items she stole to Julia's doorstep so they can be returned to their rightful places.

Upon finding either good ending, a bonus scene will be unlocked, with all of the cast members except the Chief and Carmen herself singing the theme song from the 1990s Where in the World Is Carmen Sandiego? game show. The end credits roll over an instrumental version of the theme to another 1990s animated Carmen series, Where on Earth Is Carmen Sandiego?

== Cast ==
- Gina Rodriguez as Carmen Sandiego
- Finn Wolfhard as Player
- Abby Trott as Ivy
- Michael Hawley as Zack
- Liam O'Brien as Professor Maelstrom
- Mary Elizabeth McGlynn as Coach Brunt
- Toks Olagundoye as Countess Cleo
- Sharon Muthu as Dr. Bellum & Agent Zari
- Kari Wahlgren as Sheena/Tigress
- Andrew Pifko as Antonio/El Topo
- Bernardo De Paula as Jean Paul/Le Chevre
- Kimiko Glenn as Paperstar
- Charlet Takahashi Chung as Julia Argent
- Dawnn Lewis as Chief

== Release and reception ==
Carmen Sandiego: To Steal or Not to Steal was released on March 10, 2020 on Netflix and received generally positive reviews. Sam Stone of CBR compared the interactive title to Black Mirror: Bandersnatch, calling it a "fresh, fun expansion of Carmen's world and her ongoing battle against V.I.L.E.," and a "natural extension" of the animated series itself. Stone also said that is a "fun, genuinely engaging and a natural continuation" of the main series and a strong example of Netflix producing something which can allow those of all ages "participate in its programming." Similarly, Eden Arnold of Bleeding Cool described it as perfect "edu-tainment," and provided a walkthrough for the whole special, and Jen McGuire of Romper, a sister site of Bust, called it loyal to "the original premise of the video game series." Additionally, Cal Jeffrey of Techspot stated that if its "not for you, give it some time," while Petrana Radulovic of Polygon described it as "a breezy story that takes about an hour or so to complete" but is still enjoyable, and Julia Alexander of The Verge argued that it was "a nostalgic return" to the roots of the Carmen Sandiego franchise.
