= Best Fest =

Compilation album by Rockapella
- Released: November 17, 1995
- Recorded: 1992–95
- Genre: A Cappella
- Length: 1:00:45
- Label: ForLife Records
- Producer: Masahiko Ikumi; Rockapella

Rockapella chronology
Primer (1995)	Best Fest (1995)	Lucky Seven (1996)

Best Fest is a compilation album by the a cappella group Rockapella. It is first of three Japan-only compilation albums of the group's recordings, featuring a mix of tracks from previous Japanese albums, as well as two new songs that were not previously available. It was marketed as a "greatest hits" album; a "hit" in Japan is a song that has been used in a Japanese television commercial, of which Rockapella had many. As an incentive to get fans to buy it, the album includes two previously unreleased songs, "Tornado Man" and "Always You", and separate track versions of the "Logo" songs, the different versions of the "Rockapella jingle" the group does at the beginning of each of their first five CDs.

== Track listing ==
No.	Title	Writer(s)	Length
1.	"Voco Logo"	Rockapella	0:08
2.	"I Like You Very Much"	Sean Altman	2:28
3.	"Tokyo Yo-Yo"	Ralph McCarthy, Masahiro Ikumi	4:06
4.	"Ride On Time"	Tatsuro Yamashita	4:06
5.	"Come My Way"	Sean Altman	3:10
6.	"Baroquo Logo"	Rockapella	0:12
7.	"Tornado Man"	Scott Leonard, Sean Altman	2:44
8.	"Kingdom of Shy"	Elliott Kerman, Sean Altman	2:24
9.	"Bed of Nails"	Scott Leonard	3:41
10.	"Fat Jack & Bonefish Joe"	Lisa S. Johnson, Barry Carl	3:18
11.	"Olivia (I'm Listening)"	Ami Ozaki	4:56
12.	"Snowgo Logo"	Rockapella	0:13
13.	"Give"	Scott Leonard, Barry Carl, Masahiro Ikumi	4:17
14.	"I Know Christmas"	Scott Leonard, Masahiro Ikumi	6:00
15.	"We Got A Happy Holiday"	Sean Altman	3:02
16.	"My Home"	Sean Altman, David Yazbek	3:55
17.	"Gogo Logo"	Rockapella	0:07
18.	"Zombie Jamboree"	Conral Mauge Jr.; Sean Altman (3rd verse lyrics)	3:34
19.	"Ellie My Love"	Keisuke Kuwata	4:04
20.	"Always You"	Ralph McCarthy, Masahiro Ikumi	4:20

== Personnel ==
- Scott Leonard – high tenor
- Sean Altman – tenor
- Elliot Kerman – baritone
- Barry Carl – bass
- Jeff Thacher – vocal percussion

=== Special Appearances ===
- Jaci Carl – "Fat Jack & Bonefish Joe"
- Jesse Leonard – "I Know Christmas"
- David Yazbek – vocal percussion – "I Like You Very Much"
