= 2 (Rockapella album) =

Studio album by Rockapella
- Released: March 28, 2000
- Recorded: 1999
- Genre: A Cappella
- Length: 40:19
- Label: J-Bird Records
- Producer: Scott Leonard

Rockapella chronology
Don't Tell Me You Do (1999)	2 (2000)	Christmas (2000)

Singles from 2
- 1. "This Isn't Love / That's The Way / People Change / Tempted" Released: 2000; 2. "Tempted" Released: 2000

2 is the tenth overall and fifth North American studio album by the a cappella group Rockapella. As the name suggests, it was the group's second CD released through a record company in the United States. It was recorded during the fall of 1999 and released in the spring of 2000. In 2004, the album was then re-released on Shakariki Records with two new remixes of "This Isn't Love," which replace the Folgers Coffee commercial tracks "Rockin' Morning" and "Holiday Wake-Up."

== Track listing ==
All tracks are written by Scott Leonard, except where noted.

Original track listing
No.	Title	Length
1.	"That's The Way" (Written by: Greg Clark, Scott Leonard)	3:27
2.	"People Change"	3:35
3.	"Tempted" (Written by: Chris Difford, Glenn Tilbrook)	3:33
4.	"This Isn't Love" (Written by: Scott Leonard, Greg Clark)	3:00
5.	"Is It In You?"	3:15
6.	"Doorman Of My Heart"	3:53
7.	"Bring Some Love" (Written by: Kahlil Jahi, Scott Leonard)	4:02
8.	"Where Would We Be?" (Written by: Kevin Wright, Elliott Kerman)	3:15
9.	"One Day After Day"	3:56
10.	"All That Comes To Mind"	3:21
11.	"Blah Blah Blah"	3:47
12.	"Rockin' Morning" (Written by: Folgers Coffee)	0:45
13.	"Holiday Wake-Up" (Written by: Folgers Coffee)	0:30

2 (2004 Edition)

Studio album by Rockapella
- Released: 2004
- Genre: A Cappella
- Length: 45:56
- Label: Shakariki Records
- Producer: Scott Leonard

=== 2004 re-issue ===
No.	Title	Length
1.	"That's The Way"
2.	"People Change"
3.	"Tempted"
4.	"This Isn't Love"
5.	"Is It In You?"
6.	"Doorman Of My Heart"
7.	"Bring Some Love"
8.	"Where Would We Be?"
9.	"One Day After Day"
10.	"All That Comes To Mind"
11.	"Blah Blah Blah"
12.	"This Isn't Love (Strut Remix)"	3:57
13.	"This Isn't Love (Slowgroove Remix)"	2:55

== Personnel ==
- Scott Leonard – high tenor
- Kevin Wright – tenor
- Elliott Kerman – baritone
- Barry Carl – bass
- Jeff Thacher – vocal percussion
