= The Mint Juleps =

UK musical group

- Origin: London, England
- Genres: A cappella, pop
- Years active: 1985–present
- Label: Stiff Records
- Members: Sandra Charles; Debbie Charles; Lizzie Charles; Marcia Charles; Julie Isaac; Debbie Longworth

The Mint Juleps are a six-piece all-female a cappella/pop group from the east end of London. The group, who first gained notice in 1986, consists of four sisters: Sandra, Debbie, Lizzie and Marcia Charles, who were joined by two school friends, Julie Isaac and Debbie Longworth. Before they were signed by Stiff Records, they had gained experience touring with Sister Sledge, Billy Bragg, Kool & the Gang, Lenny Henry, Shalamar, Fine Young Cannibals and they had sung back-up for Bob Geldof, the Belle Stars, Alison Moyet, Al Green, Peter Gabriel and Dr. Feelgood. Their debut album, One Time, was issued on Stiff Records in 1985. Two of their singles charted on the UK Singles Chart, the covers "Only Love Can Break Your Heart" (No. 62) in 1986 and "Every Kinda People" (No. 58) in 1987. In 1994, the album Round Our Way saw a release in both the UK and US.

In December 1988, the group appeared as a cappella singing angels in the BBC Christmas special, Billy's Christmas Angels. In 1990, they appeared in Spike Lee's television documentary, Do It Acapella.

The group also provided lead and backing vocals on Mickey Hart's Mystery Box, which was released in 1996.
