= In Concert (Rockapella album) =

2000 album by Rockapella

Live album by Rockapella
- Released: May 6, 2001
- Recorded: December 9, 2000
- Venue: Lobero Theatre, Santa Barbara, California
- Genre: A Cappella
- Length: 1:08:36
- Label: J-Bird Records; Shakariki Records
- Producer: Scott Leonard

Rockapella chronology
Christmas (2000)	In Concert (2001)	More Than Ever (2002)

In Concert (Japan Edition)

Live album by Rockapella
- Released: April 17, 2002
- Genre: A Cappella
- Label: Rentrak Records
- Producer: Scott Leonard

In Concert is the twelfth overall album, seventh North American album, and first live concert album by the a cappella group Rockapella. It was recorded live on December 9, 2000, at the Lobero Theatre in Santa Barbara, California. A corresponding DVD was also filmed as part of a PBS Special. The DVD contains a shortened version of Jeff Thacher's vocal percussion solo during "Where In The World Is Carmen Sandiego?" and does not include "Long Cool Woman In A Black Dress".

A Japanese release on Rentrak Records followed in 2002 with the same track listing, but different cover art. It was also re-released on Shakariki Records in 2004 and is available on iTunes.

== Track listing ==
No.	Title	Writer(s)	Length
1.	"I Am Your Man"	Scott Leonard	2:33
2.	"Dancin' In the Streets"	William Stevenson, Marvin Gaye	2:09
3.	"That's The Way"	Greg Clark, Scott Leonard	3:23
4.	"Let's Get Away From It All"	Tom Adair, Matt Dennis	2:09
5.	"This Isn't Love"	Scott Leonard, Greg Clark	2:53
6.	"Pretty Woman"	Roy Orbison, Bill Dees	2:23
7.	"Where in the World Is Carmen Sandiego?"	Sean Altman, David Yazbek	4:13
8.	"Blah Blah Blah"	Scott Leonard	2:36
9.	"Stand By Me"	Ben E. King, Mike Stoller, Jerry Leiber	3:14
10.	"Where Would We Be?"	Kevin Wright, Elliott Kerman	3:18
11.	"Up on the Roof/Wonderful World"	Gerry Goffin, Carole King/Sam Cooke, Lou Adler, Herb Alpert	3:31
12.	"Tempted"	Chris Difford, Glenn Tilbrook	3:38
13.	"People Change"	Scott Leonard	3:35
14.	"Use Me"	Bill Withers	3:31
15.	"Dock of the Bay"	Otis Redding, Steve Cropper	2:58
16.	"Zombie Jamboree"	Conral Mauge Jr.; Sean Altman (3rd verse lyrics)	3:04
17.	"Keep On Smilin'"	Jimmy Hall, Jack Hall, Lewis Ross, John Anthony, Ricky Hirsch	2:58
18.	"16 Tons"	Merle Travis	2:42
19.	"The Lion Sleeps Tonight"	Solomon Linda	2:30
20.	"Moments Of You"	Scott Leonard	3:14
21.	"A Change In My Life"	Billy Straus	4:57
22.	"Long Cool Woman In a Black Dress"	Roger Greenaway, Harold Clarke, Roger Cook	3:07

== Personnel ==
- Scott Leonard – high tenor
- Kevin Wright – tenor
- Elliott Kerman – baritone
- Barry Carl – bass
- Jeff Thacher – vocal percussion
