= Vocobeat =

Studio album by Rockapella
- Released: April 21, 1994
- Genre: A Cappella
- Length: 44:52
- Label: ForLife Records
- Producer: Masahiro Ikumi; Billy Straus; Rockapella

Rockapella chronology
Bash! (1992)	Vocobeat (1994)	Out Cold (1994)

Vocobeat is the fourth studio album by the a cappella group Rockapella. It is their first all original album and marks the first full-time CD debut of Jeff Thacher as the group's vocal percussionist. This album is also the first to include the phrase "All sounds on this album were produced exclusively by the voices and body parts of Rockapella" on the CD insert.

== Track listing ==
No.	Title	Writer(s)	Length
1.	"U beat me up"	Scott Leonard	3:13
2.	"Falling Over You"	Sean Altman, Billy Straus	3:11
3.	"Have A Little Faith"	Scott Leonard	4:12
4.	"My Home"	Sean Altman, David Yazbek	3:55
5.	"NYC Summa"	Scott Leonard	5:14
6.	"Follow Me To Heaven"	Sean Altman	2:58
7.	"Kingdom of Shy"	Elliott Kerman, Sean Altman	2:24
8.	"Nowhere"	Scott Leonard	3:52
9.	"Peanut Shell"	Sean Altman	2:54
10.	"Bodyboard"	Scott Leonard, Elliott Kerman	3:26
11.	"Quiet Sensation"	Barry Carl	2:45
12.	"Fat Jack & Bonefish Joe"	Lisa S. Johnson, Barry Carl	3:17
13.	"I Found Sugar"	Sean Altman, Billy Straus	3:31

== Personnel ==
- Scott Leonard – high tenor
- Sean Altman – tenor
- Elliot Kerman – baritone
- Barry Carl – bass
- Jeff Thacher – vocal percussion

=== Special appearances ===
- Jaci Carl – "Fat Jack & Bonefish Joe"
- Lisa Leonard – "U beat me up"
- Jesse Leonard – "NYC Summa"
