= Primer (album) =

Studio album by Rockapella
- Released: 1995
- Recorded: Sonalysts Studios, Waterford, Connecticut, U.S.
- Genre: A Cappella
- Length: 49:31
- Label: Independent
- Producer: Robin Danar

Rockapella chronology
Out Cold (1994)	Primer (1995)	Best Fest (1995)

Primer is the sixth studio album by the a cappella group Rockapella and marks their North American debut. Its track list was intended to represent the band's live show at the time and was recorded 99% live-in-studio over the course of two days at Sonalysts Studios in Connecticut, with the exception of the bonus track, "Shambala," which was recorded prior to the Sonalysts sessions.

== Track listing ==
No.	Title	Writer(s)	Length
1.	"Falling Over You"	Sean Altman, Billy Straus	2:55
2.	"Have A Little Faith"	Scott Leonard	3:54
3.	"For The Love"	Sean Altman	2:40
4.	"Nowhere"	Scott Leonard	4:03
5.	"Fliptop Twister"	Sean Altman	3:11
6.	"Last Night"	Scott Leonard	3:31
7.	"Kingdom of Shy"	Elliott Kerman, Sean Altman	2:21
8.	"Bed of Nails"	Scott Leonard	3:24
9.	"My Home"	Sean Altman, David Yazbek	4:09
10.	"Where In The World Is Carmen Sandiego?"	Sean Altman, David Yazbek	2:59
11.	"Come My Way"	Sean Altman	3:48
12.	"Zombie Jamboree"	Conrad Mauge, Jr.; Sean Altman (3rd verse lyrics)	2:53
13.	"Sixty Minute Man"	William Ward	1:48
14.	"Long Cool Woman in a Black Dress"	Roger Greenaway, Harold Clarke, Roger Cook	2:37
15.	"Oh, Pretty Woman"	Roy Orbison, Bill Dees	2:28
16.	"Shambala" (Bonus Studio Track)	Daniel Moore	2:50

== Personnel ==
- Scott Leonard – high tenor
- Sean Altman – tenor
- Elliott Kerman – baritone
- Barry Carl – bass
- Jeff Thacher – vocal percussion
