= Lucky Seven (Rockapella album) =

Studio album by Rockapella
- Released: 1996
- Genre: A Cappella
- Length: 34:31
- Label: Independent
- Producer: Rockapella

Rockapella chronology
Best Fest (1995)	Lucky Seven (1996)	Rockapella (1997)

Lucky Seven is the second and sixth studio album released in North America and Japan, respectively, by the a cappella group Rockapella. As the name suggests, it is the seventh overall studio album by the group. While the Japanese version was awaiting release in the fall of 1996 on ForLife Records, the group independently released it in the United States beginning that summer to be sold at concerts and via mail order. The Japanese version, titled Lucky Seven: Memories and Dreams, has different artwork, a different track order, and three more songs than the US version. This album is also the last album with Rockapella's founding member Sean Altman in it before his departure from the group the following year in 1997.

This album is the only one of Rockapella's to indicate that all percussion was performed by Jeff Thacher "without the aid of electronic sampling, sequencing, or synthesis" in the disclaimer located on the CD insert.

== Track listings ==
=== US Edition ===
No.	Title	Writer(s)	Length
1.	"I Am Your Man"	Scott Leonard	3:05
2.	"I Walk With You"	Sean Altman, Billy Straus	3:44
3.	"Lisa, I Love You"	Scott Leonard	2:56
4.	"[Sittin' On] The Dock of the Bay"	Otis Redding, Steve Cropper	2:42
5.	"Daisy Simone"	Sean Altman	3:51
6.	"Up On The Roof"	Gerry Goffin, Carole King	2:42
7.	"77"	Scott Leonard	2:55
8.	"Surfer Girl"	Brian Wilson	2:41
9.	"Stand By Me"	Ben E. King, Mike Stoller, Jerry Leiber	3:10
10.	"Let's Get Away From It All"	Tom Adair, Matt Dennis	2:15
11.	"I'll Hear Your Voice"	Scott Leonard	4:30

Lucky Seven: Memories and Dreams (Japan Edition)

Studio album by Rockapella
- Released: November 21, 1996
- Genre: A Cappella
- Length: 44:03
- Label: ForLife Records
- Producer: Rockapella

Singles from Lucky Seven: Memories and Dreams
- 1. "ダンス天国 [Land Of A Thousand Dances]" Released: September 20, 1996

=== Japan Edition ===
No.	Title	Writer(s)	Length
1.	"Lisa, I Love You"		2:55
2.	"[Sittin' On] The Dock of the Bay"		2:41
3.	"I'm Waiting"	Sean Altman	3:18
4.	"Surfer Girl"		2:39
5.	"77"		2:55
6.	"Let's Get Away From It All"		2:16
7.	"I Am Your Man"		3:05
8.	"I Walk With You"		3:45
9.	"Stand By Me"		3:07
10.	"Daisy Simone"		3:51
11.	"Up on the Roof"	Gerry Goffin, Carole King	2:40
12.	"Love Me Tender"	Elvis Presley, Vera Matson	3:04
13.	"Land of a Thousand Dances"	Chris Kenner, Antoine "Fats" Domino Jr.	3:10
14.	"I'll Hear Your Voice"		4:30

== Personnel ==
- Scott Leonard – high tenor
- Sean Altman – tenor
- Elliott Kerman – baritone
- Barry Carl – bass
- Jeff Thacher – vocal percussion
