= Out Cold (album) =

Studio album by Rockapella
- Released: November 18, 1994
- Genre: A Cappella
- Length: 52:35
- Label: ForLife Records
- Producer: Masahiro Ikumi; Billy Straus; Rockapella

Rockapella chronology
Vocobeat (1994)	Out Cold (1994)	Primer (1995)

Out Cold is the fifth studio and second holiday album by the a cappella group Rockapella. ForLife Records wanted the group to do a second Christmas album, but settled for a mixture of Christmas and non-holiday music. This combination has led it to be described as the "winter romance" album.

== Track listing ==
No.	Title	Writer(s)	Length
1.	"Last Night"	Scott Leonard	5:00
2.	"1st Night"	Scott Leonard	3:15
3.	"Secret Santa"	Sean Altman	2:52
4.	"Christmas Ceasefire" (Sung in Japanese)		4:40
5.	"Come My Way"	Sean Altman	3:10
6.	"Glow Worm/It's Beginning to Look a Lot Like Christmas"	Johnny Mercer, Lilla Cayley Robinson, Mel Tormé, Paul Lincke/Meredith Willson	2:43
7.	"NYC Winter"	Scott Leonard	4:21
8.	"The Christmas Song"	Robert Wells, Mel Tormé	4:05
9.	"For The Love"	Sean Altman	2:44
10.	"Rock River"	Elliott Kerman, Billy Straus	4:13
11.	"Winter Wonderland"	Richard B. Smith, Felix Bernard	2:55
12.	"Rudolph The Red-Nosed Reindeer"	Johnny Marks	3:13
13.	"Bored & Stroked"	Barry Carl	3:24
14.	"I Know Christmas"	Scott Leonard, Masahiro Ikumi	6:00

== Personnel ==
- Scott Leonard – high tenor
- Sean Altman – tenor
- Elliot Kerman – baritone
- Barry Carl – bass
- Jeff Thacher - vocal percussion

=== Special appearances ===
- Jesse Leonard – "I Know Christmas"
