= Steven Dorian =

American singer

Steven Asadoorian
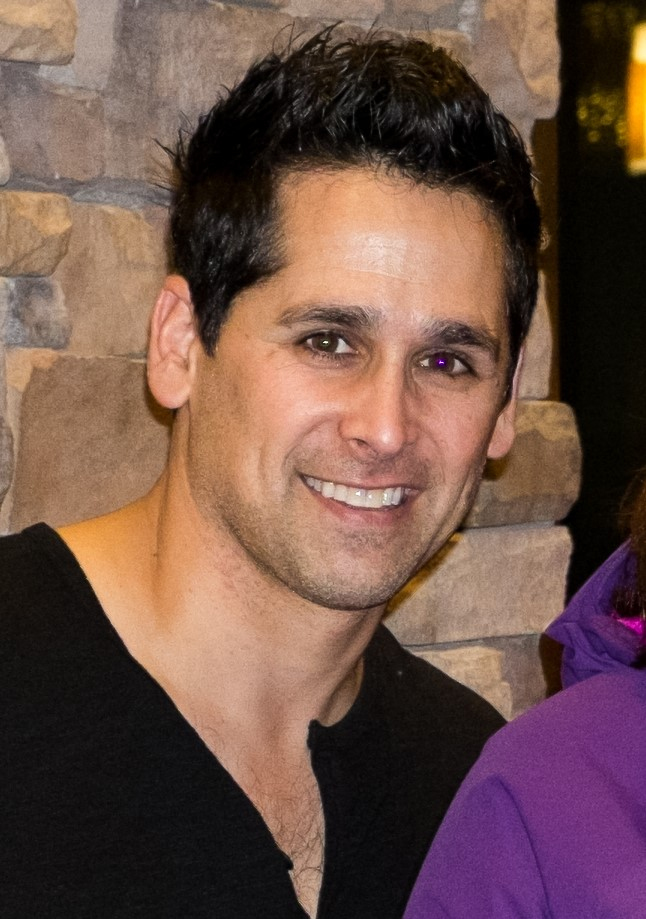
- Dorian in 2013

Background information
- Also known as: Steven Dorian
- Born: Steven Asadoorian; November 15, 1977 (age 48); Northbridge, Massachusetts
- Origin: Whitinsville, Massachusetts
- Genre: A cappella
- Occupations: Singer, performer
- Instrument: Vocals
- Years active: 2001–present (performer); 2010–present (band)
- Labels: Shakariki Records / PAID, Inc.
- Formerly of: Rockapella
- Website: rockapella.com

Steven Dorian (born November 15, 1977) is an American singer best known as a tenor in the a cappella group Rockapella from 2010 to 2016.

== Early life ==
Born in Northbridge, Massachusetts to parents who were both teachers and musically involved, his father playing saxophone and clarinet and his mother a singer, Dorian has always been surrounded by music, and began playing the guitar at age 13. His first gig was at a pub his high school science teacher owned, playing a duo show with his brother, Greg Asadoorian. Over the next 6 years, Dorian and his brother continued to play shows both by themselves and with various bands on through their college years. Dorian credits this to be the experience that taught him how to sing lead and harmonies. "I owe most of my musical knowledge to my brother during those years. He taught me so much, and still does to this day." In high school, however, music always took a backseat to Dorian's interest in sports. Being a football, baseball, and basketball player at Northbridge High School, his free time was scarce and playing trumpet in the school's marching band at the same time was near impossible. After he graduated in 1996, Dorian continued to focus on sports and exercise more than music, seeing it as only a hobby, and attended the University of Massachusetts Amherst, where he played baseball and majored in Exercise Science on an athletic scholarship all four years.

== Musical career ==
After obtaining his degree in 2000, Dorian moved to Florida and became a personal trainer, performing in bars around the Tampa Bay area on the side. Then, in 2001, he auditioned for a job as a singer-guitarist in a rock and roll show at Busch Gardens Tampa Bay for the fun of it, and was hired, simultaneously starting his performing career and ending his career as a personal trainer. For the next four years, Dorian perfected his stage presence through choreographed dancing and performing without a guitar in his hands. Seeking a new experience, he moved on from Busch Gardens to Carnival Cruise Lines, working for six months in two production shows that found him singing broadway, Latin, and pop music in a cast of two singers, 18 dancers, and a live show band. After his short stint in cruise ship entertainment, Dorian went to Branson, Missouri in 2005 and found a year of work in two tribute shows entitled Lost in the Fifties and Stuck in the Seventies. He has stated it was this engagement where he really learned to blend his singing and performing with others whom he shared the stage with. Coming back to Tampa from his time in Branson, Dorian found himself in various shows at the Tampa Bay Performing Arts Center, a regional theater, and ultimately auditioned for and got a part in his first show with the Walt Disney World Resort at the Polynesian Resort. From 2006 to 2008, he was cast in Mickey's Twas the Night Before Christmas Show, a part of the Magic Kingdom's Mickey's Very Merry Christmas Party. Having proved himself to the company, Dorian acquired a much coveted spot in the Festival of the Lion King in Disney's Animal Kingdom from 2007 until 2009, when he first learned of the audition for his biggest break yet. He also released an EP in 2016 called "Living".

=== Rockapella ===
After tenor Kevin Wright announced his leave from Rockapella in August 2009, the group began a nationwide search for their newest band member. Having sorted through over 150 singers, ten applicants were chosen to audition with the group in Boston in September of that year; Dorian was one of those ten singers. The band sent him three songs to learn: their original show opener "Tonight", their rendition of The Beatles' "Got To Get You into My Life", and a song titled "Imagination", a Temptations/John Lennon mash-up of "Just My Imagination (Running Away with Me)" and "Imagine". "I worked for about two weeks to learn those songs, and, for me, it was very new so I was busting my neck to learn them." Dorian was offered the job as tenor of Rockapella, and began in January 2010 after the departure of Wright the previous holiday season. As a member of the nationally acclaimed group, Dorian has contributed two songs to the group's accumulation of songs: "Cupid", a Sam Cooke mashup of "Another Saturday Night", "Cupid", and "You Send Me", and "Malibu Grand Prix", an original written by Dorian and a friend that the group arranged into an a cappella recording for their 2010 album Bang. Dorian left the band in 2016 and was replaced by Mitchell Rains. Despite his departure, he is a supporting and substitute musician of the group.

== Personal life ==
Dorian has 3 siblings: Greg, Sara, and Rick, all of whom are musically involved and can play at least one instrument, while all of the 4 Asadoorian children can play the guitar. Dorian has said that their parents are their inspiration and influence for not only their music goals, but their lifelong goals. His brother Rick Asadoorian was the first round pick to the Boston Red Sox in 1999.

Dorian continued to do showings of the Festival of the Lion King at the Walt Disney World Resort, playing the role of Nakawa, while he lived in Orlando, Florida and wasn't on tour with Rockapella. In the summer of 2012, Dorian moved to Nashville, Tennessee to expand his solo career.

== Discography ==
| Release Date | Album | Line-up | Label |
|---|---|---|---|
| November 2011 | A Rockapella Holiday | Leonard, Dorian, Brown, Baldi, Thacher | Shakariki Records / PAID, Inc. |
| September 2010 | Bang | Leonard, Dorian, Brown, Baldi, Thacher | Shakariki Records / PAID, Inc. |
| January 2016 | Living (EP) | Dorian | |
