= Christmas (Rockapella album) =

2000s album

Studio album by Rockapella
- Released: October 24, 2000
- Genre: A Cappella
- Length: 36:14
- Label: J-Bird Records; Shakariki Records
- Producer: Scott Leonard

Rockapella chronology
2 (2000)	Christmas (2000)	In Concert (2001)

Christmas is the eleventh overall, sixth North American, and third holiday album released by the a cappella group Rockapella. It was re-released on Shakariki Records in 2004. The album wasn't released in Japan until 2001 on Rentrak Records and has a different track list and different artwork.

== Track listings ==
The US and Japanese editions differ on multiple songs regarding who is given credit. To illustrate this, the writing credits are shown below as they appear on each respective album.

=== US edition ===
No.	Title	Writer(s)	Length
1.	"I Heard The Bells On Christmas Day"	Traditional	1:45
2.	"The Hope We Hold"	Scott Leonard	3:14
3.	"Glow Worm / It's Beginning to Look a Lot Like Christmas"	Paul Lincke & Johnny Mercer, Lilla Cayley Robinson (additional lyrics by Mel Tormé) / Meredith Willson	2:41
4.	"Silver Bells"	Jay Livingston, Ray Evans	3:00
5.	"Christmas Without You"	Scott Leonard	3:38
6.	"Santa Claus Is Coming To Town"	(not included in list of song credits)	2:39
7.	"Have Yourself A Merry Little Christmas"	Ralph Blane, Hugh Martin	3:35
8.	"Winter Wonderland"	Felix Bernard, Richard B. Smith	2:43
9.	"The Christmas Song"	Robert Wells, Mel Tormé	3:30
10.	"White Christmas"	Irving Berlin	2:42
11.	"Hold Out For Christmas"	Scott Leonard	3:34
12.	"You're A Mean One, Mr. Grinch"	Albert Hague, Theodor Seuss Geisel	3:14

Christmas (Japan Edition)

Studio album by Rockapella
- Released: November 30, 2001
- Genre: A Cappella
- Label: Rentrak Records
- Producer: Scott Leonard

=== Japan edition ===
No.	Title	Writer(s)	Length
1.	"Silver Bells"	Jay Livingston, Ray Evans
2.	"I Heard The Bells On Christmas Day"	John Baptiste, Henry Longfellow
3.	"The Hope We Hold"	Scott Leonard
4.	"Glow Worm / It's Beginning To Look A Lot Like Christmas"	Johnny Mercer, Lilla Cayley Robinson, Mel Tormé, Paul Lincke / Meredith Willson
5.	"Have Yourself A Merry Little Christmas"	Ralph Blane, Hugh Martin
6.	"Winter Wonderland"	Richard Smith, Felix Bernard
7.	"The Christmas Song"	Robert Wells, Mel Tormé
8.	"White Christmas"	Irving Berlin
9.	"Christmas Without You"	Scott Leonard
10.	"Santa Claus Is Coming To Town"	Haven Gillespie, J. Fred Coots
11.	"You're A Mean One, Mr. Grinch"	Albert Hague, Theodor Seuss Geisel
12.	"Hold Out For Christmas"	Scott Leonard

== Personnel ==
- Scott Leonard – high tenor
- Kevin Wright – tenor
- Elliott Kerman – baritone
- Barry Carl – bass
- Jeff Thacher – vocal percussion

=== Special appearances ===
- Natalie Leonard – "The Hope We Hold"
