= Rockapella =

American a cappella musical group

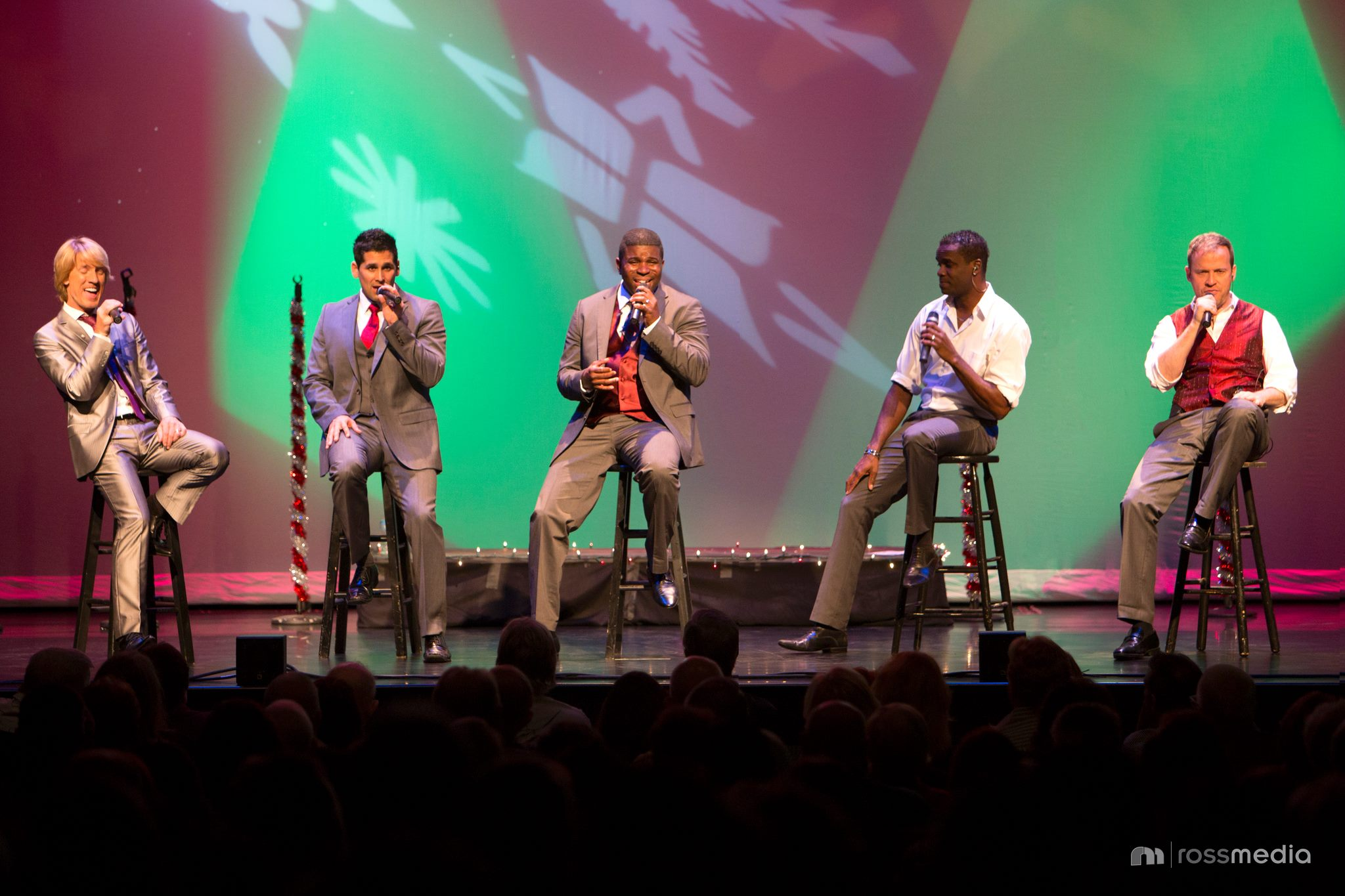
- Rockapella (L-R) Scott Leonard, Steven Dorian, Calvin Jones, George Baldi III, and Jeff Thacher performing in Clearwater, Florida on December 20, 2013.

Background information
- Origin: New York City, U.S.
- Genres: A cappella
- Years active: 1986–present
- Labels: Shakariki Records / PAID, Inc., Amerigo Records, J-Bird Records, Rentrak Records, ForLife Records
- Members: Scott Leonard; Jeff Thacher; Calvin Jones; Manny Houston; Armand Hutton
- Past members: Sean Altman; Elliott Kerman; Steve Keyes; David Stix (deceased); Charlie Evett; Barry Carl; Kevin Wright; John K. Brown; George Baldi III; Steven Dorian; Ryan Chappelle; Mitchell Rains; Jose Rosario; Bryant Vance
- Website: www.rockapella.com

Rockapella is an American a cappella musical group formed in 1986 in New York City. The group's name is a portmanteau of "rock" and "a cappella". Rockapella sings original vocal music and a cappella versions of other songs. Over time, their sound has evolved from high-energy pop and world music style toward a sound more influenced by R&B. Rockapella found their enduring success in Japan early in their career. They are most successful for their role as a house band and comedy troupe on the PBS children's geography game show Where in the World Is Carmen Sandiego?.

In addition to three compilation albums in Japan, Rockapella has released 19 albums in the US and Japan. Since the band's vocal percussionist was hired, the line "All sounds provided by the voices and appendages of Rockapella" has been printed on each of their CDs.

== Band history ==
=== Early years (1986–1990) ===
The founding members of Rockapella consisted of Brown University alumni Sean Altman, Elliott Kerman, Steve Keyes, and David Stix. They had each been in an a cappella group at Brown called High Jinks, but not all at the same time. Having been in High Jinks the longest, Altman was the only connection between the other three members; when they found each other in New York City following their graduation, they decided to form Rockapella. The band began performing on New York City street corners in 1986 with a hat at their feet and a song repertoire that consisted of a mix of barbershop arrangements and a cappella renditions of classic doo wop pieces that evolved to focus less on oldies and barbershop and more on contemporary rock music. Passers-by began to drop business cards into the hat, and these street corner performances led to private party and club performances around NYC.

Stix left the group in 1987 to pursue his artistic career and was replaced by Charlie Evett. That same year, a dinner party performance for television personality Kathie Lee Gifford led to Rockapella's 1988 appearance on the WABC-TV show The Morning Show, Regis Philbin and Gifford's NYC morning talk show before it went national. Their performance of Altman's signature arrangement of the calypso novelty standard "Zombie Jamboree" caught the eye of producer Gerard Brown. He invited Rockapella to perform on the PBS "Great Performances" TV special Spike Lee & Company – Do It A Cappella, which would put them into the national spotlight. However, Evett left the group to continue a career in software design in 1988 before the special's taping, and Barry Carl was hired to take his place.

=== Where in the World Is Carmen Sandiego? (1991–1996) ===
With a PBS special and numerous morning talk show appearances under their collective belt, Rockapella was noticed by the producers of Where in the World Is Carmen Sandiego?, an up-and-coming children's geography game show based on the computer game of the same name by Brøderbund Software. Shortly before the show's premiere, Keyes had decided to leave Rockapella to launch his legal career, but was still part of the band when they auditioned and were hired to write and perform the show's theme song as well as appearing as the comic relief house band. Keyes was replaced by Scott Leonard, who had just returned from a career as the lead singer in a Tokyo Disneyland electronic rock band. Between Leonard joining the band and the start of their television break, Rockapella began to pick up fame, starring in a Whoopi Goldberg HBO comedy special Chez Whoopi, a Taco Bell commercial, and opened for acts such as Chuck Berry, Styx, Billy Joel, and their a cappella idols The Persuasions, who the group had met on the Do It A Cappella special. They also performed on Jay Leno's first New Year's Eve episode of The Tonight Show in 1992.

Rockapella first appeared on the half-hour game show in 1991 and later continued to appear daily for five seasons, catapulting the band's four members into mid-level television celebrity status and making the Rockapella-performed theme song (which was penned by Altman and his childhood friend, David Yazbek) as one of the best known television themes in history. Jeff Thacher joined Rockapella as the band's permanent vocal percussionist in 1993, although he only appeared on Carmen Sandiego during its fifth and final season two years later. While Rockapella was seen daily in homes across America, Leonard used his connections to the Japanese music market to acquire a recording contract with ForLife Records. The group released seven albums of original and cover material under this label in Japan during their run on Carmen Sandiego and for two years after that, being the first to bring contemporary a cappella music to Japan. On the final episode of Carmen Sandiego, Sean Altman memorably had his blonde braids cut by show host Greg Lee. As the other members of Rockapella became aware that his braids were actually being cut, they stopped miming the title song and covered their mouths in shock.

=== Post-Carmen Sandiego years (1997–present) ===
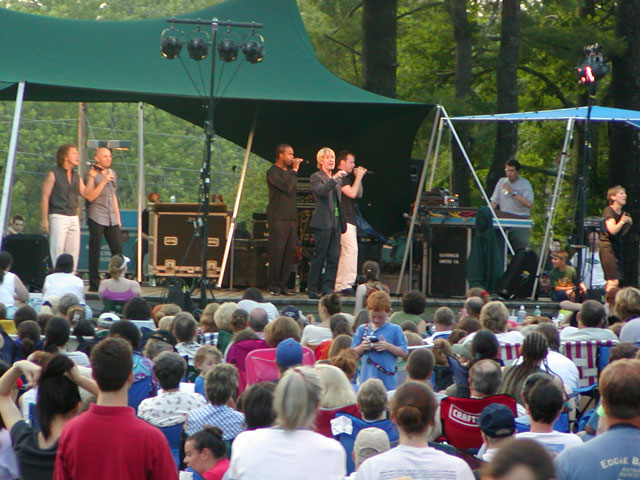
Rockapella performing in 2003. (L-R) Kevin Wright, Elliott Kerman, George Baldi III, Scott Leonard, Jeff Thacher.

Following the end of Carmen Sandiego in 1996, Altman left Rockapella to pursue his solo career the following year, and was replaced by Kevin Wright. They did two Folger's coffee commercials between 1998 and 2001 and a PBS special of their December 9, 2000, concert. In 2002, Carl was replaced by George Baldi III. In 2003, the group started their now annual "A Rockapella Holiday" tour, and in 2004, they released a live album, as well as re-released all of their previous North American albums on the independent label Shakariki Records. That same year, Kerman, the group's baritone and the last remaining founding member of the group, left and was replaced by John K. Brown, a second tenor. Rockapella began joining the Boston Pops on stage in the eastern US in 2006, creating a concert experience that shows both the orchestra's and Rockapella's talents separately and together in a manner never done before: a cappella with instrumentation. In August 2009, Wright announced he would be leaving the group at the end of the year to spend more time with his family; his last performance with the band was on December 22 of that same year, and was replaced by Steven Dorian.

The project to make "Bang", the title track off their newest album, the first track in Rock Band to feature full, four-instrument gameplay based on no live or synthesized instruments began in the summer of 2010, and was released for purchase on January 30, 2011 through the RBN. At the beginning of 2011, the band's cover of "It's A Small World" from their album Comfort & Joy, was featured in a TV commercial for the animated film Gnomeo and Juliet. On November 16, 2011, Rockapella released a new holiday album, A Rockapella Holiday.

In 2022, Jose Rosario left the group and was replaced by Manny Houston. Bryant Vance left the group at that time as well, allowing George Baldi III to return. By mid-2023, Baldi left the group once again and was replaced by Armand Hutton.

== Personnel ==
Current members

- Scott Leonard - Countertenor (1991–present)
- Jeff Thacher - Vocal Percussion (1993–present)
- Calvin Jones - Tenor (2013–present)
- Armand Hutton - Bass (2023–present)
- Manny Houston - Tenor (2022–present)

Former members

- Sean Altman - Tenor (1986-1997; founding member)
- Elliott Kerman - Baritone (1986-2004; founding member)
- Steve Keyes - Countertenor (1986-1991; founding member)
- David Stix - Bass (1986-1987; founding member)
- Charlie Evett - Bass (1987-1988)
- Barry Carl - Bass (1988-2002)
- Kevin Wright - Tenor (1997-2009)
- John K. Brown - Tenor (2004-2013)
- Bryant Vance - Bass (2016-2022)
- Ryan Chappelle - Bass (2014–2016)
- Steven Dorian - Tenor (2009–2016)
- Mitchell Rains - Tenor (2016-2019)
- Jose Rosario - Tenor (2019–2022)
- George Baldi III - Bass (2002-2014, 2022-2023)

Former supporting musicians

- Kenny X – Vocal percussion (1992; touring)
- David Yazbek – Vocal percussion (1992; session)
- Nathan Herron – Tenor (2014–???; substitute for Steven Dorian)
- Rolin E. Alexis – Bass (2014–???; substitute for George Baldi III and Ryan Chappelle)
- Christopher Rossi – Tenor (2013–???; tenor substitute)

== Discography ==
=== US & International albums ===
Country	Release date	Title	Line-up	Label
Japan	May 21, 1992	To N.Y.	Altman, Kerman, Carl, Leonard	ForLife Records
Japan	May 21, 1992	From N.Y.	Altman, Kerman, Carl, Leonard	ForLife Records
Japan	December 16, 1992	Bash!	Altman, Kerman, Carl, Leonard	ForLife Records
Japan	April 21, 1994	Vocobeat	Altman, Kerman, Carl, Leonard, Thacher	ForLife Records
Japan	November 18, 1994	Out Cold	Altman, Kerman, Carl, Leonard, Thacher	ForLife Records
USA	1995	Primer	Altman, Kerman, Carl, Leonard, Thacher	Independent
	1996 (US); November 21, 1996 (Japan)	Lucky Seven	Altman, Kerman, Carl, Leonard, Thacher	Independent (US); ForLife Records (Japan)
USA	1997	Rockapella	Kerman, Carl, Leonard, Thacher, Wright	Independent
USA	February 16, 1999	Don't Tell Me You Do	Kerman, Carl, Leonard, Thacher, Wright	J-Bird Records
USA	March 28, 2000	2	Kerman, Carl, Leonard, Thacher, Wright	J-Bird Records
USA; Japan	October 24, 2000 (US); November 30, 2001 (Japan)	Christmas	Kerman, Carl, Leonard, Thacher, Wright	J-Bird Records (US); Rentrak Records (Japan)
USA; Japan	May 6, 2001 (US); November 30, 2001 (Japan)	In Concert	Kerman, Carl, Leonard, Thacher, Wright	J-Bird Records (US); Rentrak Records (Japan)
USA	August 13, 2002	Smilin'	Kerman, Carl, Leonard, Thacher, Wright, Baldi	Amerigo Records
USA	November 12, 2002	Comfort & Joy	Kerman, Leonard, Thacher, Wright, Baldi	Amerigo Records
USA	June 2004	Live in Japan	Kerman, Leonard, Thacher, Wright, Baldi	Shakariki Records
USA	November 16, 2011	A Rockapella Holiday	Leonard, Thacher, Dorian, Baldi, Brown	Shakariki Records
USA	September 21, 2010	Bang	Leonard, Thacher, Dorian, Baldi, Brown	Shakariki Records
USA	March 15, 2013	Motown & More	Leonard, Thacher, Dorian, Baldi, Brown	Shakariki Records
USA	September 2017	Jams, Vol. 1	Leonard, Thacher, Rains, Jones, Vance	Shakariki Records
USA	December 2018	Jams, Vol. 2	Leonard, Thacher, Rains, Jones, Vance	Shakariki Records
USA	December 2019	Christmas Live	Leonard, Thacher, Rains, Jones, Vance	Shakariki Records

All albums from Don't Tell Me You Do through Comfort & Joy were re-released in the US by Shakariki Records in 2004.

=== Compilation albums ===
Country	Release date	Album	Line-up	Label
Japan	November 17, 1995	Best Fest	Altman, Kerman, Carl, Leonard, Thacher	ForLife Records
Japan	September 2002	Best A Cappella	Altman, Kerman, Carl, Leonard, Thacher	ForLife Records
Japan	September 25, 2002	More Than Ever	Kerman, Carl, Leonard, Thacher, Wright	Rentrak Records

=== Miscellaneous albums ===
Release date	Album	Line-up
2005	Live at Duo Music Exchange	Kerman, Baldi, Leonard, Thacher, Wright

=== Singles and EPs ===
Release date	Title	Line-up	Label
1993	"Where in the World Is Carmen Sandiego?"	Altman, Kerman, Carl, Leonard	Zoom Express
April 11, 2015	"Rock Around the Clock"/"Tell Me Something Good"	Leonard, Thacher, Dorian, Jones, Chappelle	Shakariki Records
February 9, 2016	"Candy Man"	Leonard, Thacher, Dorian, Jones, Chappelle	Shakariki Records
July 23, 2016	"Sir GotALot"	Leonard, Thacher, Dorian, Jones, Chappelle	Shakariki Records
November 4, 2016	"Better 2gether"	Leonard, Thacher, Rains, Jones, Vance	Shakariki Records
June 1, 2017	"Workin My Way to You"	Leonard, Thacher, Rains, Jones, Vance	Shakariki Records
November 22, 2017	"How 'Bout Now?"	Leonard, Thacher, Rains, Jones, Vance	Shakariki Records
November 2019 (vinyl); July 23, 2020 (digital)	Where in the World Is Carmen Sandiego? EP	Leonard, Thacher, Rains, Jones, Vance	Enjoy the Toons Records (vinyl); Shakariki Records (digital)
September 24, 2021	"Gimme Money (Con and On and On)" (from The Big Con)	Leonard, Thacher, Jones, Vance, Rosario	Skybound Games
February 21, 2023	"Lost in Love"	Leonard, Thacher, Jones, Baldi, Houston	Shakariki Records
January 31, 2024	"Let It Be"	Leonard, Thacher, Jones, Baldi, Houston	Shakariki Records

=== Other appearances ===
Year	Artist	Album	Song(s)	Line-up
1990		Spike Lee & Company: Do It a Cappella	"Zombie Jamboree"; "Under the Boardwalk" (with True Image)	Altman, Keyes, Kerman, Carl
1991		Zappa's Universe	"Elvis Has Left the Building"; "Heavenly Bank Account"	Altman, Kerman, Carl, Leonard
1992		Modern A Cappella	"Zombie Jamboree" (taken from Spike Lee & Company: Do It a Cappella)	Altman, Keyes, Kerman, Carl
1992		Where in the World is Carmen Sandiego?	"Capital"; "Everything to Me"; "My Home" (with The Persuasions); "Let's Get Away From It All"; "Indiana"; "Where in the World Is Carmen Sandiego?"	Altman, Kerman, Carl, Leonard
1993	The Muppets	Muppet Beach Party	"Papa-Oom-Mow-Mow"	Altman, Kerman, Carl, Leonard
1993		Put on Your Green Shoes	"Light of the Sun" (with Richie Havens)	Altman, Kerman, Carl, Leonard
1993		Carmen Sandiego: Out of This World	"Big Wet Rag"	Altman, Kerman, Carl, Leonard, Thacher
1994		Biggest Little Ticket	"Everything to Me"; "I Like You Very Much"	Altman, Kerman, Carl, Leonard, Thacher
1994		95.5 WPLJ Presents Scott & Todd's Scam-America Comedy Album Vol. II	"Where in the World Is Joseph P. Nolan"	Altman, Kerman, Carl, Leonard, Thacher
1994		1994 World University Games	”Pass on the Torch (I Know New York)"	Altman, Kerman, Carl, Leonard
1995		Ben & Jerry's One World One Heart for Kids	"The Light of the Sun" (with Richie Havens)	Altman, Kerman, Carl, Leonard, Thacher
1995	Anri	Opus 21	”Moon in the Rain" (background vocals)	Altman, Kerman, Carl, Leonard
1996		Voices Only: A Cappella Originals	"Bed of Nails"	Altman, Kerman, Carl, Leonard, Thacher
1997	Anri	Twin Soul	”Wiper on a Sunny Day" (background vocals)	Altman, Kerman, Carl, Leonard, Thacher
1999	Sam Harris	Revival	"A Change in My Life" (background vocals)	Kerman, Carl, Leonard, Thacher, Wright
2000		A Cappella Christmas Party	"Hold Out for Christmas"	Altman, Kerman, Carl, Leonard
2000		Mark and Brian: Little Drummer Boys	"Silver Bells" (live)	Kerman, Carl, Leonard, Thacher, Wright
2002		20 Christmas Stars, Vol. IV	"Merry Christmas Darling"	Kerman, Leonard, Thacher, Wright, Baldi
2007		Hokie Nation: An A Cappella Tribute	"I'll Hear Your Voice"	Kerman, Carl, Leonard, Thacher, Wright
2016		Sing 13: Superstition	"Sir GotALot"	Leonard, Thacher, Jones, Vance, Rains

=== Solo albums and appearances ===
Release date	Artist	Album	Song(s)
1996	Scott Leonard	My Favorites: The Bee Gees	
1997	Sean Altman	SeanDEMOnium	
February 1999	fi-Ling Fader (Scott Leonard)	Bluespeel	
2002	fi-Ling Fader (Scott Leonard)	Nice Kitty	
March 2002	Sean Altman	Alt.mania	
July 2004	Barry Carl	The SoLow Project	
2005	Sean Altman	Losing Streak	
2005	The Groovebarbers (Altman, Evett, Keyes)	Glory	
2006	Jewmongous (Sean Altman)	Unorthodox	
May 2007	Scott Leonard	1man1mike	
2008	Jewmongous (Sean Altman)	Taller Than Jesus	
January 2009	John K. Brown	Essence of Worship	
January 2009	John K. Brown	God Has a Hold on Me	
March 2009	Altman, Carl, Kerman	Schoolhouse Rock! Earth	"You Oughta Be Savin' Water"
March 2009	Altman, Carl	Schoolhouse Rock! Earth	"Save the Ocean"
2010	The Groovebarbers (Altman, Evett, Keyes)	Guts	
March 2010	Scott Leonard	Tokyo Robots - 1M1M2	
June 2010	John K. Brown	bOOmbOOm	
June 2011	John K. Brown	Unplugged	
November 2012	John K. Brown	A "Just Play It" Christmas	
2014	The Groovebarbers (Altman, Evett, Keyes)	Warning: Barbershop!	
2016	The Groovebarbers (Altman, Evett, Keyes)	Zombie Jamboree	
December 2016	Sean Altman's Jewmongous (Sean Altman)	The Least Jewy Jew in Jewville	
2019	Sean Altman	Salt	"Then Comes Lonely" (Kerman) "David Yazbek Phone Message" (Yazbek) "Left" (Yazbek)
2023	The Everly Set (Sean Altman duo)	Golden Hits	
2024	Forever Simon & Garfunkel (Sean Altman duo)	Classics	

== Songs used in commercials ==
- Gnomeo and Juliet - feature film trailer
- Folgers coffee
- NBC The Today Show promos for the earliest version of the program's "Where in the World is Matt Lauer?" segment. The song was re-recorded later in different styles by other musicians.
- Mounds/Almond Joy
- Doritos
- Mazola
- Kent Super Lights - Japan-only
- Showtime - (Became "We Got A Happy Holiday" song from Japan-only album "Bash")
- HBO
- Taco Bell
- Bacardi
- Budweiser
- AFLAC insurance
- ProScan televisions
- Arby's
- Ozone Ford - Long Island, NY dealership (now defunct)
- Tools To Help You Choose (an infomercial about the TV Ratings System) feat. Bob Keeshan (aka Captain Kangaroo)
- BuiltBar Health Bars
- The Big Con, a 2021 video game

== Filmography ==
- WPIX's 40th Anniversary (1988, guest appearance)
- Comic Strip Live (1989, guest appearance)
- Spike Lee & Co. Do It A Capella (1990, guest appearance)
- Where in the World Is Carmen Sandiego? (1991-1995, house band and comedy troupe)
- Chez Whoopi (1991, guest appearance)
- Zappa's Universe (1991, guest appearance)
- The Tonight Show (1992, guest appearance)
- The Biggest Little Ticket (1993, guest appearance)
- The 1996 Orange Bowl Parade
- Joe's Apartment (1996, were the voices of The Roach Chorus)
- Happily Ever After: Fairy Tales for Every Child (1997, were the voices of The Five Little Piggies in the special, "Mother Goose: A Rapping and Rhyming Special")
- Penn & Teller's Sin City Spectacular (1998, guest appearance)
- Where in the Universe Is Carmen Sandiego? (1999)
- The 1999 Macy's Thanksgiving Day Parade
- So You Think You Can Dance Canada (2011, guest appearance)
