= Comfort & Joy =

Studio album by Rockapella
- Released: November 12, 2002
- Genre: A Cappella; Holiday
- Length: 41:10
- Label: Amerigo Records; Shakariki Records
- Producer: Scott Leonard

Rockapella chronology
Best A Cappella (2002)	Comfort & Joy (2002)	Live In Japan (2004)

Comfort & Joy is the fourteenth overall, ninth North American, and fourth holiday album by the a cappella group Rockapella. It was re-released in 2004 on Shakariki Records.

== Track listing ==
No.	Title	Writer(s)	Length
1.	"Little Mary Snowflake"	Scott Leonard	3:03
2.	"Rudolph The Red-Nosed Reindeer"	Johnny Marks	3:02
3.	"Merry Christmas Darling"	Richard Carpenter, Frank Pooler	4:03
4.	"Love And The Lights"	Kevin Wright, Andy Zulla	3:17
5.	"I'll Be Home for Christmas"	Walter Kent, Kim Gannon, Buck Ram	3:43
6.	"This Christmas Day"	Scott Leonard	3:08
7.	"Home For The Holidays"	Robert Allen, Al Stillman	3:12
8.	"Please Come Home for Christmas"	Charles Brown, Gene Redd	3:50
9.	"Rockin' Around the Christmas Tree"	Johnny Marks	3:03
10.	"Snowstar"	Scott Leonard	3:01
11.	"Peace On Earth"	Jeff Thacher, Tim Foust, Jacob Miller	4:17
12.	"It's A Small World"	Sherman Brothers	3:31

== Personnel ==
- Scott Leonard – high tenor
- Kevin Wright – tenor
- Elliott Kerman – baritone
- George Baldi III – bass
- Jeff Thacher – vocal percussion

=== Special appearances ===
- Deahna Baldi
- Jesse and Natalie Leonard
- Grace and Hope Wright
- Debbie and Eli Kerman
- Fred Schuchman
- Phil Gulotta
