= Scott Leonard =

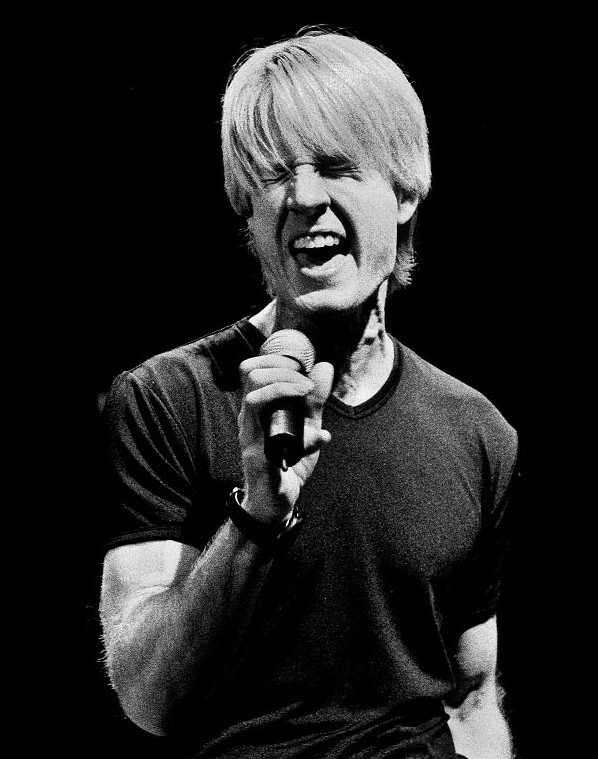
- Scott Leonard singing with Rockapella

Background information
- Born: Charles Scott Leonard IV; October 11, 1965 (age 60); Indianapolis, Indiana, U.S.
- Genres: A cappella, pop
- Occupation: Singer-songwriter
- Instrument: Vocals
- Years active: 1991–present
- Labels: Kikilala, Shakariki/PAID, Amerigo, J-Bird, Rentrak, For Life
- Website: www.scottleonardmusic.com

Charles Scott Leonard IV (born October 11, 1965) is an American singer and a member of the a cappella group Rockapella, the former house band on the PBS children's geography game show Where in the World Is Carmen Sandiego?

== Biography ==
Leonard was born and raised in Indianapolis, Indiana, and attended Lawrence North High School, where he sang in a barbershop–doo wop group. Leonard attended the University of Tampa on a baseball scholarship while studying as a voice major. After graduating in 1987, he got a job singing at Walt Disney World Resort that would also lead to a similar singing job at Tokyo Disneyland in Japan for two years, where he led the Japanese electronic rock band Horizon, released a solo album, and became fluent in Japanese. Leonard returned to the United States looking for a singing job in 1990. Having seen an ad in a New York performing arts newspaper, he auditioned to be the high tenor for Rockapella and got the position in 1991, moving to New York City as a result. During Rockapella's stint as the house band on Where in the World Is Carmen Sandiego?, Leonard used his connections to the Japanese recording market to obtain a record deal for the group, resulting in seven CDs released in Japan on the ForLife Records label. Over the years, Leonard has become the front man for Rockapella; having been in the group for almost 25 years, he has been the high tenor on all but one of the official Rockapella albums/recordings and is currently the main songwriter–arranger for Rockapella, and produces their recordings in his home recording studio, The Bungalette.

Leonard moved to Tampa, Florida, in 2001, where he lives with his wife and two children. Leonard still sings with Rockapella as of 2025 and is the only original cast member in the group today.

== Discography ==
=== Solo CDs/Guest Appearances ===
Year	Album	Artist
March 2010	Tokyo Robots - 1M1M2	Scott Leonard
May 2007	1man1mike	Scott Leonard
2002	Nice Kitty	Scott Leonard (fi-Ling Fader)
June 1999	The Triangle	Crown Lee (Leonard as one of various guest musicians)
February 1999	Bluespeel	Scott Leonard (Flying Faders)
1997	SeanDEMOnium	Sean Altman
1997	Happily Ever After: Fairy Tales for Every Child (Episode: Mother Goose: A Rappin' and Rhymin' Special)	(Rockapella) Member of the five little piggies
1996	Joe's Apartment	(Rockapella) As a member of The Roach Chorus
1996	My Favorites: The Bee Gees	Scott Leonard
May 1991	Dance Classics Altered House Vol. 1 Male Vocal Compilation	The OG's featuring Scott Leonard

=== With Rockapella ===
==== Domestic releases ====
Release Date	Album	Line-up	Label
November 2011	A Rockapella Holiday	Leonard, Dorian, Brown, Baldi, Thacher	Shakariki Records / PAID, Inc.
September 2010	Bang	Leonard, Dorian, Brown, Baldi, Thacher	Shakariki Records / PAID, Inc.
June 2004	Live In Japan	Leonard, Wright, Kerman, Baldi, Thacher	Shakariki Records
November 2002	Comfort & Joy	Leonard, Wright, Kerman, Baldi, Thacher	Amerigo Records; Re-released on Shakariki Records in 2004
August 2002	Smilin'	Leonard, Wright, Kerman, Carl, Baldi, Thacher	Amerigo Records; Re-released on Shakariki Records in 2004
March 2001	In Concert	Leonard, Wright, Kerman, Carl, Thacher	J-Bird Records; Re-released on Shakariki Records in 2004
October 2000	Christmas	Leonard, Wright, Kerman, Carl, Thacher	J-Bird Records; Re-released on Shakariki Records in 2004
March 2000	2	Leonard, Wright, Kerman, Carl, Thacher	J-Bird Records; Re-released on Shakariki Records in 2004
February 1999	Don't Tell Me You Do	Leonard, Wright, Kerman, Carl, Thacher	J-Bird Records; Re-released on Shakariki Records in 2004
Mid-1997	Rockapella	Leonard, Wright, Kerman, Carl, Thacher	Independent
Mid-1996	Lucky Seven	Leonard, Altman, Kerman, Carl, Thacher	Independent
Mid-1995	Primer	Leonard, Altman, Kerman, Carl, Thacher	Independent

==== International releases ====
Year	Album	Line-up	Label
2002	In Concert	Leonard, Wright, Kerman, Carl, Thacher	Rentrak Records
November 2001	Christmas	Leonard, Wright, Kerman, Carl, Thacher	Rentrak Records
November 1996	Lucky Seven: Memories And Dreams	Leonard, Altman, Kerman, Carl, Thacher	ForLife Records
November 1995	Best Fest	Leonard, Altman, Kerman, Carl, Thacher	ForLife Records
November 1994	Out Cold	Leonard, Altman, Kerman, Carl, Thacher	ForLife Records
April 1994	Vocobeat	Leonard, Altman, Kerman, Carl, Thacher	ForLife Records
December 1992	Bash!	Leonard, Altman, Kerman, Carl	ForLife Records
May 1992	From N.Y.	Leonard, Altman, Kerman, Carl	ForLife Records
May 1992	To N.Y.	Leonard, Altman, Kerman, Carl	ForLife Records

==== Compilations ====
Release Date	Album	Line-up	Label
September 2002	Best A Cappella	Leonard, Altman, Kerman, Carl, Thacher	ForLife Records
2002	More Than Ever	Leonard, Wright, Kerman, Carl, Thacher	Rentrak Records

==== Unaffiliated releases ====
Year	Album	Line-up	Label
Summer 2005	Live At Duo Music Exchange	Leonard, Wright, Kerman, Baldi, Thacher	Duo Records

==== Various releases ====
Year	Album	Line-up	Song
2007	Hokie Nation: An A Cappella Tribute	Leonard, Wright, Kerman, Carl, Thacher	"I'll Hear Your Voice"
2002	20 Christmas Stars, Vol. IV	Leonard, Wright, Kerman, Baldi, Thacher	"Merry Christmas Darling"
2000	Mark and Brian: Little Drummer Boys	Leonard, Wright, Kerman, Carl, Thacher	"Silver Bells" (Live performance)
2000	A Cappella Christmas Party	Leonard, Altman, Kerman, Carl	"Hold Out For Christmas"
1999	Revival - Sam Harris	Leonard, Wright, Kerman, Carl, Thacher	"A Change In My Life" (Background vocals)
1996	Voices Only: A Cappella Originals	Leonard, Altman, Kerman, Carl, Thacher	"Bed Of Nails"
1993	Carmen Sandiego: Out of This World	Leonard, Altman, Kerman, Carl, Thacher	"Big Wet Rag"
1993	Put On Your Green Shoes	Leonard, Altman, Kerman, Carl	"Light Of The Sun" w/Richie Havens
1993	Muppet Beach Party	Leonard, Altman, Kerman, Carl	"PapaOomMowMow"
1992	Where in the World is Carmen Sandiego?	Leonard, Altman, Kerman, Carl	"Capital" "Everything To Me" "My Home" "Let's Get Away From It All" "Indiana" "Where In The World Is Carmen Sandiego?"
1992	Modern A Cappella	Leonard, Altman, Kerman, Carl	"Zombie Jamboree"
1991	Zappa's Universe	Leonard, Altman, Kerman, Carl	"Elvis Has Left The Building" "Heavenly Bank Account"
