= Long Cool Woman in a Black Dress =

- Cover of the 1972 French single

Single by the Hollies

from the album Distant Light
- B-side: "Cable Car" (UK); "Look What We've Got" (US)
- Released: 1 April 1972
- Recorded: 16–30 July 1971
- Studio: AIR, London
- Genre: Swamp rock
- Length: 3:15
- Label: Parlophone (UK); Epic (US)
- Songwriters: Allan Clarke; Roger Cook; Roger Greenaway
- Producers: The Hollies; Ron Richards

The Hollies singles chronology
"The Baby" (1972)	"Long Cool Woman in a Black Dress" (1972)	"Magic Woman Touch" (1972)

"Long Cool Woman in a Black Dress" (also titled "Long Cool Woman" or "Long Cool Woman (in a Black Dress)") is a song written by Allan Clarke, Roger Cook, and Roger Greenaway and performed by the British rock group the Hollies. In an interview with Johnnie Walker on BBC Radio 2 on Sounds of the 70s in April 2023, Clarke said it had been written by Cook and himself. Cook had a long-standing agreement with Greenaway that any songs written by one of them should be credited to both.

Originally appearing on the album Distant Light, it was released as a single on 17 April 1972 (on Parlophone in the United Kingdom), selling 2 million copies worldwide, including 1.5 million in the United States. It reached number two on the Billboard Hot 100 in September 1972 for two weeks, behind Gilbert O'Sullivan's "Alone Again (Naturally)". Billboard ranked it as the number-24 song for 1972.

== Background and recording ==
On the day "Long Cool Woman" was recorded at AIR Studios, the group's producer, Ron Richards, was ill, and as a result, the song was produced by the group. "Long Cool Woman" is different from most other Hollies songs in that it has no three-part vocal harmonies. Allan Clarke's lead vocal is the only voice prominently heard. It also features lead guitar by Clarke. Upon his return, Richards mixed the recording.

The lyrics set a scene similar to a film noir crime drama. The singer, who is an FBI agent, is in a speakeasy filled with criminals. He falls for an attractive, 5-ft, 9-in woman in a black dress and helps rescue her when gunshots ring out.

The song was initially written in the country/rockabilly style of Jerry Reed, then adapted more to the swamp rock style of Creedence Clearwater Revival, in terms of rhythm, vocal, and melodic styles. Clarke imitated John Fogerty's vocal style, which was based on the Creedence song "Green River". According to Clarke, the song was written "in about five minutes".

== Reception ==
U.S. music-business magazine Cash Box said of the song: "rockin' in the tradition of Creedence and T Rex, the Hollies at their most commercial since 'He Ain't Heavy.'" In the Hollies' native United Kingdom, the song was only a modest success, peaking at number 32 on the charts. However, it was a much bigger hit in the United States, peaking at number two for two weeks, making it the group's highest-charting single ever in the US. It topped the charts in South Africa, and also reached number two in Australia and New Zealand. By that time, Clarke had left the band, but felt that "it wasn't unfortunate", for he had co-written the song. Clarke rejoined the Hollies in the summer of 1973, partly due to the success of the song.

== Personnel ==
- Allan Clarke – lead vocals, lead guitar
- Tony Hicks – rhythm guitar
- Terry Sylvester – rhythm guitar
- Bernie Calvert – bass
- Bobby Elliott – drums

== Charts ==
=== Weekly singles charts ===
Chart (1972)	Peak position
Australia	2
Canada (RPM 100 Singles)	1
Netherlands (Gfk Top 100 Singles)	21
New Zealand (Listener)	2
South Africa (Springbok)	1
UK Singles Chart	32
US Billboard Hot 100	2
US Cash Box Top 100	1

=== Year-end charts ===
Chart (1972)	Rank
Australia	16
Canada	19
South Africa	10
US Billboard	24
US Cash Box Top 100	20

== Certifications ==
Region	Certification	Certified units/sales
New Zealand (RMNZ)	3× Platinum	90,000^{‡}
United Kingdom (BPI)	Silver	200,000^{‡}
United States (RIAA)	Platinum	1,000,000^{^}
^{^} Shipments figures based on certification alone.^{‡} Sales+streaming figures based on certification alone.

== In popular culture and cover versions ==
- Phantom, Rocker & Slick released their version on their 1986 album Cover Girl.
- "Long Cool Woman in a Black Dress" was the first song played by the band Phish. They also played the song at their 15th and 20th anniversary concerts.
- A cappella group Rockapella released a version on their 1995 album Primer. Their version often accompanied the map round on Where in the World is Carmen Sandiego?.
- Country music singer T. G. Sheppard covered the song on his 1997 album Nothin' on But the Radio.
- The song was used in the films Air America, Downsizing, Remember the Titans, Amores Perros, The Longest Yard, The Lovely Bones, Trouble with the Curve, Teenage Mutant Ninja Turtles: Out of the Shadows, and Kong: Skull Island.
- Country music singer Clint Black released his version of the song to country radio on 19 February 2008, under the title "Long Cool Woman". Black's version charted on the Hot Country Songs chart at No. 58.
- Heavy metal rocker Vince Neil released a heavier version of "Long Cool Woman", along with other covers and original material, on his third studio album, Tattoos & Tequila, on 22 June 2010.
- The Utah Mammoth of the National Hockey League have used a remix of the song by Moonlight whenever they win games at Delta Center.
