= Carmen Sandiego: Out of This World =

1994 tie-in album

Soundtrack album by Various artists
- Released: March 29, 1994
- Studio: Kampo, Manhattan, New York; Live Wire, Sacramento, California; RPM, Manhattan; Manhattan Beach, Manhattan
- Genre: Pop; Alternative rock; Children's
- Length: 32:34
- Label: BMG Kidz; Zoom Express; Fight Records
- Producer: Sean Altman; David Yazbek; Billy Straus

Where in the World Is Carmen Sandiego? chronology
Where in the World Is Carmen Sandiego? (1992)	Carmen Sandiego: Out of This World (1994)

Carmen Sandiego: Out of This World is a tie-in album to the children's television game show Where in the World Is Carmen Sandiego? Five of its ten songs, as well as the spoken track "A Brief Disclaimer," were performed by the show's host, Greg Lee. Lynne Thigpen, who co-starred on the show as The Chief, also contributed a song, as did the show's house band, Rockapella. Unlike its predecessor, it was marketed to both children and adults, owing to the inclusion of rock bands XTC and They Might Be Giants.

The song "Change My World," credited to "Johnny Nexdor & His Neighbors," was actually performed by Rockapella member and album producer Sean Altman, mimicking the style of XTC. In turn, XTC's "Cherry in Your Tree" was recorded for the album after producer David Yazbek, knowing of the lead singer Andy Partridge's unreleased "bubblegum" songs, suggested they contribute one to the album. They Might Be Giants' "Why Does the Sun Shine," a cover of a 1959 song by Tom Glazer, was taken from their EP of the same name.

== Track listing ==
Out of This World track listing
No.	Title	Writer(s)	Performer(s)	Length
1.	"Half a World Away"	Billy Straus	Greg Lee with 3 Brave Woodsmen	3:59
2.	"Big Wet Rag"	David Yazbek	Rockapella	2:39
3.	"Cherry in Your Tree"	Andy Partridge	XTC	2:53
4.	"A Brief Disclaimer"		Greg Lee	0:32
5.	"Cake for Breakfast"	Yazbek	Greg Lee	3:33
6.	"My Parents' Son"	Sean Altman	Greg Lee	3:45
7.	"Change My World"	Straus; Altman	Johnny Nexdor & His Neighbors	2:35
8.	"Why Does the Sun Shine? (The Sun Is a Mass of Incandescent Gas)"	Hy Zaret; Lou Singer	They Might Be Giants	2:50
9.	"Bugs"	Yazbek	Greg Lee	3:50
10.	"Back to Chicago"	Altman	Lynne Thigpen	2:47
11.	"Carmen's Song"	Yazbek; Altman	Greg Lee	3:11

== Personnel ==
Credits adapted from liner notes.

- Sean Altman, David Yazbek – Producers (except "Why Does the Sun Shine?")
- Billy Straus – Producer, engineer, mixer (except "Why Does the Sun Shine?"); guitar, bass guitar ("Half a World Away")
- Julio Peralta, Raging Dave Robbins, Suzanne Dyer – Assistant engineers (except "Why Does the Sun Shine?")
- Jed Alpert – Executive producer
- 3 Brave Woodsmen – Vocals ("Half a World Away")
  - Burl Mann
  - Ian Jaeger
  - Norm Raposbec
- Rockapella – Vocals ("Big Wet Rag")
  - Scott Leonard – High tenor
  - Sean Altman – Tenor
  - Elliott Kerman – Baritone
  - Barry Carl – Bass
  - Jeff Thacher – Vocal percussionist
- XTC ("Cherry in Your Tree")
  - Andy Partridge – Vocals, guitar
  - Colin Moulding – Vocals, bass guitar
  - Brian Doherty – Drums
  - Dave Gregory – Guitar
- They Might Be Giants ("Why Does the Sun Shine?")
  - John Linnell – Accordion, saxophone, bass clarinet, vocals, producer
  - John Flansburgh – Electric guitar, vocals, producer

== Critical reception ==
Allmusic's William Ruhlmann gave the album a rating of 3 stars out of 5, but described it as "appealing pop-rock music."

The Toledo Blade's Allan Detrich suggested that artists like XTC and They Might Be Giants were used to appeal to a younger demographic. He added that some of the songs have "fun lyrics and make even older listeners smile."
