= Where in the World Is Carmen Sandiego? (album) =

1992 soundtrack album

Soundtrack album by Rockapella and various artists
- Released: November 10, 1992
- Studio: RPM, New York, New York
- Genre: A cappella; Children's; Pop
- Length: 37:31
- Label: BMG Kidz; Zoom Express; Fight Records
- Producer: David Yazbek; Billy Straus; Sean Altman

Where in the World Is Carmen Sandiego? chronology
Where in the World Is; Carmen Sandiego? (1992)	Carmen Sandiego: Out of This World (1994)

Where in the World Is Carmen Sandiego? or Where in the World Is Carmen Sandiego? The Album is a soundtrack album to the game show of the same name that ran from 1991 to 1995. Rockapella, the house band on the show throughout its entire run, performed six of the ten songs on the album.

== Background ==
Rockapella had been hired as the game show's house band when the show's producer saw the group on the special Spike Lee & Company: Do It a Cappella and felt their sound could appeal to a young audience. The group was surprised by their success, given the show's target audience of children, in contrast to their previous target market of adults in their 20s–40s.

== Release ==
Following the premise of the game show, some of the songs in the album are related to geography, such as "Capital", which lists the state capitals of the United States (comically omitting Pierre, South Dakota). However, other songs have no geographic basis, and many include witty humor aimed to adults. While touring prior to the album's release, Rockapella member Barry Carl said of the lyrics: "We don't wish to talk down to teens – they're more sophisticated."

In addition to Rockapella, the album featured several acts with appeal to adults, including The Persuasions and Tito Puente. Nevertheless, it was "positioned as a 'family' album [and stocked] in children's departments in record stores."

The album features multiple genres, including ska ("Beautiful Place"), salsa ("Amazing World"), folk rock ("Feeling Fine"), and Celtic pop ("The Violin").

== Track listing ==
Where in the World Is Carmen Sandiego? track listing
No.	Title	Writer(s)	Performer(s)	Length
1.	"Capital"	Sean Altman	Rockapella	3:30
2.	"Everything to Me"	Altman; David Yazbek	Rockapella	3:19
3.	"Beautiful Place (NYC)"	Yazbek	Urban Blight	4:18
4.	"My Home"	Altman; Yazbek	Rockapella and The Persuasions	4:50
5.	"Amazing World"	Yazbek	Tito Puente featuring Nestor Sanchez	4:40
6.	"Feeling Fine"	Billy Straus	3 Brave Woodsmen	4:20
7.	"Let's Get Away from It All"	Tom Adair; Matt Dennis	Rockapella	2:23
8.	"The Violin"	Yazbek (includes an interpolation of The Trip to the Cottage, a traditional Irish jig)	Brian Dewan and Eileen Ivers	4:00
9.	"Indiana"	Altman	Rockapella	3:23
10.	"Where in the World Is Carmen Sandiego?"	Altman; Yazbek	Rockapella	2:48

=== Interludes ===
Five tracks on the album include interludes before or after the main songs:

- Track 2 concludes with a spoken interlude performed by Greg Lee as a New York City Subway announcer.
- Track 4 concludes with a rendition of Toss the Feathers performed by Jerry O'Sullivan on uilleann pipes.
- Track 6 concludes with an interlude skit in which Pierre, South Dakota, then-mayor Gary Drewes leaves a message on Rockapella's answering machine, protesting Pierre's omission from "Capital."
- Track 9 concludes with a spoken interlude performed by Lee and a chorus of schoolchildren introducing Rockapella.
- Track 10 concludes with a postlude performed by Rockapella.

== Personnel ==
Credits adapted from liner notes.

- David Yazbek, Sean Altman – Producers, executive producers
- Billy Straus – Producer, engineer
- Mike Scalcione – Assistant engineer
- Jed Alpert – Co-executive producer
- Greg Lee – Voice (himself, subway announcer)
- Gary L. Drewes – Voice (himself)

"Capital," "Everything to Me," "My Home," "Let's Get Away From It All," "Indiana," "Where in the World Is Carmen Sandiego?":

- Rockapella – Vocals
  - Sean Altman – Tenor
  - Elliott Kerman – Baritone
  - Barry Carl – Bass
  - Scott Leonard – High tenor
- David Yazbek – Vocal percussion

"Capital":

- David Yazbek, Sean Altman, Billy Straus – Arrangement
- Karl Atkins, Jenny Grooby, Angela Howe, Lisa Leonard, Angie Schworer, Anne B. White – Chorus

"Everything to Me" and "Where in the World Is Carmen Sandiego?":

- David Yazbek, Sean Altman, Billy Straus – Arrangement

"Beautiful Place (NYC)":

- Urban Blight
  - Keene Carse – Lead vocals, drums
  - Dan Lipman – Lead vocals, guitar
  - Wyatt Sprague – Bass guitar
  - Paul Vercesi – Tenor saxophone
  - Tony Orbach – Baritone saxophone
  - Kevin Batchelor – Trumpet
  - Jamie Carse – Keyboards
- David Yazbek – Additional percussion, arrangement

"My Home":

- The Persuasions – Vocals
  - Jayotis Washington
  - Jerry Lawson
  - Joe Russell
  - Jimmy Hayes
- Sean Altman – Arrangement

"Amazing World":

- Tito Puente – Percussion
- Nestor Sanchez – Vocals
- Mary Lee Kortes, Valerie Wilson, Steve Gutman, Elliott Kerman, David Yazbek, Sean Altman – Chorus
- Steve Gutman, David Yazbek – Arrangement

"Feeling Fine":

- 3 Brave Woodsmen – Vocals
  - Burl Mann
  - Ian Jaeger
  - Norm Raposbec
- Keene Carse – Drums
- Billy Straus – Guitar, bass guitar, arrangement
- John Shelly – Acoustic guitar
- David Yazbek – Organ, percussion

"Let's Get Away From It All":

- Elliott Kerman, Rockapella – Arrangement

"The Violin":

- Brian Dewan – Lead vocals
- Eileen Ivers – Fiddle
- Joanie Madden – Tin whistle
- Jerry O'Sullivan – Uileann pipes
- Jaime Rodriguez – Bodhran, spoons
- Chris Bishop – Bass guitar
- Keene Carse – Drums
- Billy Straus – Guitar, chorus
- David Yazbek – Guitar, chorus, arrangement
- James Ducey – Chorus

"Indiana":

- Sean Altman, Billy Straus – Arrangement
