= Dirty Rotten Scoundrels: Original Broadway Cast Recording =

Cast recording by the original Broadway cast of Dirty Rotten Scoundrels
- Released: May 10, 2005
- Recorded: March 14, 2005
- Length: 68:45
- Label: Ghostlight
- Producers: David Yazbek, Billy Strauss

Professional ratings
Review scores
Source	Rating
Allmusic	4/5 stars

Dirty Rotten Scoundrels: Original Broadway Cast Recording is the cast recording of the 2004 musical Dirty Rotten Scoundrels. It was produced by David Yazbek and Billy Strauss. Yazbek was also the lyricist and composer. This album was chosen as one of Amazon's Top 100 Editor's Picks of 2005.

== Pre-release CD giveaway ==
On April 27, 2005, thousands stood in line at the Imperial Theatre to get free copies of the CD. Several members of the Broadway cast, as well as David Yazbek, were on hand to sign copies.

== Track listing ==
All tracks are written by David Yazbek.

No.	Title	Performer(s)	Length
1.	"Overture"	Orchestra	1:40
2.	"Give Them What They Want"	John Lithgow; Gregory Jbara; Original Broadway Cast of Dirty Rotten Scoundrels	3:09
3.	"What Was a Woman to Do"	Joanna Gleason; Female Cast of Dirty Rotten Scoundrels	3:09
4.	"Great Big Stuff"	Norbert Leo Butz; Cast	3:57
5.	"Chimp in a Suit"	Jbara; Cast	1:48
6.	"Oklahoma?"	Sara Gettelfinger; Lithgow; Cast	2:18
7.	"All About Ruprecht"	Lithgow; Butz; Gettelfinger	3:48
8.	"Here I Am"	Sherie Rene Scott; Cast	2:40
9.	"Nothing is Too Wonderful to Be True"	Scott; Butz	3:26
10.	"The Miracle"	Scott; Butz; Lithgow; Cast	2:31
11.	"Ruffhousin' Mit Shüffhausen"	Butz; Scott; Lithgow	4:44
12.	"Like Zis, Like Zat"	Jbara; Gleason; Cast	3:18
13.	"The More We Dance"	Lithgow; Scott; Cast	4:36
14.	"Love is My Legs"	Butz; Scott; Cast	3:30
15.	"Love Sneaks In"	Lithgow	2:12
16.	"Son of Great Big Stuff"	Butz; Scott	1:40
17.	"A Message from John Lithgow"	Lithgow	0:36
18.	"The Reckoning"	Lithgow; Butz; Jbara	1:36
19.	"Dirty Rotten Number"	Lithgow; Butz	3:00
20.	"Finale"	Cast	1:22
21.	"Here I Am" (original rough demo)	David Yazbek	3:16
22.	"All About Ruprecht" (original rough demo)	Yazbek	4:29
23.	"Nothing is Too Wonderful to Be True" (cover)	Scott; Bill Charlap	4:24
Total length:			67:09

== Personnel ==
Cast

- John Lithgow – Lawrence Jameson
- Norbert Leo Butz – Freddy Benson
- Sherie Rene Scott – Christine Colgate
- Joanna Gleason – Muriel Eubanks
- Gregory Jbara – Andre Thibault
- Sara Gettelfinger – Jolene Oakes

Ensemble vocals

- Timothy J. Alex
- Andrew Asnes
- Roxane Barlow
- Stephen Campanella
- Joe Cassidy
- Julie Connors
- Rachel de Benedet
- Laura Marie Duncan
- Sally Mae Dunn
- Tom Galantich
- Jason Gillman
- Greg Graham
- Amy Heggins
- Grasan Kingsberry
- Michael Paternostro
- Rachelle Rak

Production

- Howard Joines – music coordination
- Jim Abbott – synthesizer programming

Musicians

- Fred Lassen – conductor
- Antoine Silverman – concertmaster
- Michael Nicholas – violin, viola
- Claire Chan – violin, viola
- Cenovia Cummins – violin
- Belinda Whitney – violin
- Paul Woodiel – violin
- Anja Wood – cello
- Sarah Carter – cello
- Andrew Sterman – reed 1 (flute, piccolo, alto flute, clarinet, alto saxophone, soprano saxophone)
- Dan Willis – reed 2 (flute, clarinet, tenor saxophone, soprano saxophone, oboe, English horn)
- Mark Thrasher – (flute, clarinet, bass clarinet, baritone saxophone, bassoon)
- Jim Hyne – trumpet 1 (trumpet, flugelhorn, cornet)
- Hollis "Bud" Burridge – trumpet 2 (trumpet, flugelhorn)
- Dave Stahl – trumpet 3 (trumpet, flugelhorn)
- Theresa Macdonnell – French horn
- Mike Boschen – trombone, bass trombone
- Dan Lipton – keyboard 1, piano
- Jan Rosenberg – keyboard 2
- Erik Della Penna – acoustic guitar, electric guitar, archtop guitar, banjo, lap steel guitar
- Mike Duclos – bass guitar
- Dean Sharenow – drums
- Howard Joines – percussion

== Awards ==
Year	Award type	Category	Result
2006	Grammy Award	Best Musical Theater Album	Nominated
