= Rock River Music =

- Type: Division
- Industry: Entertainment
- Founded: 1995; 31 years ago
- Founder: Billy Straus
- Parent: Rock River Communications, Inc.
- Website: rockrivermusic.com

Rock River Music, a division of Rock River Communications, Inc., is a music licensing and production company.

Founded in 1995 by Billy Straus, Rock River Music produced music for clients such as Pottery Barn, adidas, Gap, Ford Motor Company, Holiday Inn and others.

== History ==
In the early 1990s, musician Billy Straus co-produced an eclectic album of new music based on the hit children's television series Where in the World is Carmen Sandiego?. Believing the album had great potential, he and his collaborators were frustrated by the inability of BMG Music to effectively market and distribute the album. This gave birth to the idea of bypassing the major distributors entirely, developing instead an alternate method of getting music of all genres in front of potential listeners by selling directly through non-music retailers. Initially rebuffed by all but one such retailer, Straus delivered one of the first for-sale branded CD compilations for Pottery Barn in 1995. The collection of holiday music entitled A Cool Christmas sold all 15,000 units within two weeks. Teaming up with business partner Jeff Daniel in 1997, Rock River continued to produce branded CD compilations for Pottery Barn, with over 100 titles released in over a decade. At least three compilations sold in excess of 100,000 copies.

In 2001, Rock River provided Volkswagen with "RadioVW", an early example of brand-sponsored internet radio. RadioVW offered listeners multiple channels of music, including tracks from Volkswagen television ads.

With the rise of digital music delivery, Rock River negotiated innovative licensing deals for online promotions. In early 2007, Rock River produced music-based video and audio podcasts for clients such as Chrysler and Ford. According to the Wall Street Journal, Rock River "struck some of the first deals to license major-label content for podcasts."

Rock River also expanded its scope to include original music production. In 2007, Rock River produced "Bob Marley: Roots, Rock, Remixed", the first collection of remixes authorized by the family of the late reggae singer. The release became the subject of a protracted lawsuit when Rock River sued Universal Music for interfering with the album's release after Universal disparaged Rock River's rights in the underlying master recordings. After the Ninth Circuit Federal Appeals Court ruled unanimously in Rock River's favor, the suit was settled out of court thus avoiding a jury trial.

== Clients ==
- adidas
- Banana Republic
- Bluenotes
- Chrysler
- Cuervo
- Diet Coke
- Ford
- Gap
- Hilton
- Intercontinental Hotels
- Levi's
- LG
- Mini
- Old Navy
- Pottery Barn
- Princess Cruises
- Restoration Hardware
- Skyy Vodka
- Tropicana
- Tylenol
- Volkswagen
- W Hotels
- Wells Fargo
- Williams Sonoma
