= Club Kidsoft =

American software company

A typical Club KidSoft envelope and CD-ROM. The cover design changed with each issue.

KidSoft Inc. was an educational software company based in Los Gatos, California. It was started in May 1992 by Richard Devine and Charles Patterson, in conjunction with Alison Woods (partner at Woods+Woods Design), Audrey Mac Clean, and Karen Schultz.

The Club KidSoft children's magazine and catalog concept was the brainchild from a creative collaboration between Designer/Art Director Alison Woods and copywriter Paula Polley. The first prototypes were developed by Woods+Woods Design and used for raising the first round of venture funding for the project. Alison Woods was brought on board as vice president and creative director to oversee the creative direction of the magazine and CD-ROM and Paula Polley worked remotely as the senior copywriter and editor.

The enterprise was subsequently managed by Dan’l Lewin (formerly the head of education at Apple Computer) and Lucia Steinhilber.

Howard Blumenthal (formerly the creator/producer of PBS series, Where in the World Is Carmen Sandiego?) came on board to develop a TV series for the project, which was never actualized. After the TV show concept was killed, Blumenthal took creative control of the final issue of the magazine and CD-ROM before the entire enterprise was disbanded.

In its heyday, Club KidSoft was a quarterly children's magazine and multimedia CD-ROM, focusing on educational software. It was the first computer magazine for children, and ultimately reached a circulation of over 100,000.

The combined magazine and CD-ROM had an annual subscription cost of US$15.95. Soon after launch, the magazine and the catalog were separated. The reworked magazine featured articles and activities related to children's use of computers; these were supported by KidSoft-produced activities on the CD-ROM.

In an effort to increase its subscriber base, KidSoft signed deals to bundle the CD-ROM portion of its magazine with new Apple Performa and Compaq Presario desktop computers.

== Magazine ==
In its initial form, the magazine portion was divided into two parts. The first third was filled with content aimed at kids such as puzzles, mazes, games and paper airplanes. The remaining two-thirds was normally a catalog of the games available on the CD-ROM which came with the magazine. The later separation of the magazine and catalog allowed KidSoft to become an advertiser-supported children's magazine about computers, and the catalog to become a standalone mail-order catalog filled with "kid-tested, parent-approved" software.

== CD-ROM ==
The KidSoft Clubroom with host "Dr. Gigabyte"

The CD-ROM was an enhanced CD which was both a data and audio hybrid, that contained demo versions of software that could be unlocked directly from the disk by using a product key purchased from KidSoft. The CD-ROM also contained activities for "Club Members" (anyone who owned or used the CD). The remaining portion of the CD-ROM was an interactive software catalog with about forty software titles, none of which were made by KidSoft. The catalog included a picture of the game's cover art, a brief description of the game, awards won, reviews, system requirements, and sometimes a demo of the game. Some demos were interactive while others were multimedia slideshows with screenshots from the game. Many more demos than were linked through the launcher could be played directly in the Demos directory on the CD-ROM.

Two versions of the software were available for either Apple Macintosh, or Microsoft Windows. The audio portion had music and announcements from Club KidSoft. The software portion of the CD-ROM was devoted to kid-contributed content such as paintings and written stories. Software could be purchased by calling KidSoft and paying with a credit card number. The service representative would then provide a unique serial number which could be typed into the launcher program. Once verified this would allow the full version of the purchased game to be installed. This action is provided through a specially coded program generated by the installer, which behaved like a disk image mounting utility—correct unlock codes allowed the utility to decrypt and mount the contents from the disk images as part of the CD-ROM's internal structure. It was a Control Panel program on Macintosh computers and a terminate-and-stay-resident driver on Windows computers.

== Business ==
The company produced one of AOL's first retail stores, and used an early version of e-commerce and branding of digital media.

KidSoft was acquired by Hearst Corporation, which distributed the magazine for a brief period. In time, KidSoft ceased publication of the magazine, and then, ceased its software distribution activities. During its final year, KidSoft was reworked as a low-priced retail brand for older children's software.
