= Howard Blumenthal =

American television producer and author

Howard Blumenthal is an American television and new media producer, author, educator, and executive. Born and raised in New York City and nearby suburbs, he is the son of author and Concentration producer Norm Blumenthal, and the grandson of radio and music retailer Harry Blumenthal. He is best known as the co-creator and producer of the Peabody Award-winning PBS video game-based game show, Where in the World Is Carmen Sandiego?

== Early years ==
A college assignment resulted in an extensive, unpublished encyclopedia of rock music, which provided access to the record industry. He became a publicist at Warner Bros. Records' New York City office, and a music journalist for ROCK, Circus, Crawdaddy!. He worked on the production and research staff of ABC game shows, The Big Showdown and The Money Maze, writing questions for the later about popular music.

== New media ==
In 1976, Warner Communications initiated a new venture in cable television called QUBE. The venture focused on two key developmental areas: new cable television channels; and the development of interactive television. Although several new cable television channels were contemplated, three channels were developed: a music channel for teenagers that became MTV; a channel for children called Nickelodeon; and a movie channel to compete with Showtime and HBO called The Movie Channel. Blumenthal led the initial team responsible for the music channel, producing its first pilot program with director Glenn Gordon Caron. For the interactive television effort, Blumenthal developed and produced interactive games (based upon an interactive console developed by Warner's technology group and Pioneer Electronics); including the first interactive game show, How Do You Like Your Eggs? hosted by Bill Cullen, and a prototype for a 24-hour automated game channel whose contributors included Charles Csuri. Blumenthal also coordinated efforts between QUBE and new Warner acquisition Atari.

In the 1980s, many media companies were beginning to explore the potential of new technologies. The popularity of portable audio devices resulted in a new form of publishing: adaptations of books on audiotape. As head of marketing for Warner Audio Publishing, the company established learning products with Looney Tunes; penetration into the emerging young adults market with Sweet Valley High; and high-profile products suitable for mall store sale with celebrity biographies. For Wiley, he developed and produced a product line for sophisticated business customers; topics included personal finance, creativity and innovation, power and authority, and high-level corporate strategy. Some of these projects resulted in books series, notably The Portable MBA series. As additional storage capacity became available, book and software publishers developed more sophisticated educational games. For Parker Brothers, Blumenthal developed a computer game to demonstrate the cooperative thinking skills provided by various parts of the brain. For The Learning Company, he developed product and market strategies for adult education in foreign languages.

In the 1990s, technology and industry demand shifted to richer interactive works. He worked with HarperCollins to develop a rich interactive version of the popular illustrated children's book, Whatley's Quest, and with Merriam Webster in the reinvention of interaction between young students and dictionaries; the resulting work was Merriam-Webster's Dictionary for Kids, published by Mindscape. As Editor-in-Chief for a new CompuServe project, he developed the first on-line service for children, and a personal finance service for adults with Money magazine. With KidSoft (subsequently acquired by Hearst), children and parents were encouraged to explore new learning software and the emerging online environment through a magazine, a club membership, and samples of software that could be used on then-new personal computers.

By the late 1990s, new media investment had shifted from the CD-ROM and online service business to internet sites. Partly as a result of its acquisition of competitor Music Boulevard, CDNow had emerged as the leader in the music retailing vertical. Encouraged by an upcoming merger with Columbia House (a record club owned by Time Warner and SONY), CDNow developed plans to become "the MTV of the internet"—with an emphasis on music industry news, artist interviews, internet radio, and video documentaries about music and musicians. Blumenthal was hired as the executive in charge of the new effort, which eventually expanded to include advertising, business development, public relations, promotion, record company relationships, artist relations, and projects with Oldsmobile, Hard Rock Cafe, and other partners. Subsequently, CDNow was acquired by Bertelsmann.

== Television ==
Early work as a television producer resulted in various series for Warner and its QUBE network, including a popular movie game show, Screen Test. As Showtime attempted to compete with fast-growing competitor HBO, the U.S.’s second largest pay TV network invested in entertainment specials and the re-staging of Broadway shows. Completed works in this domain include The Me Nobody Knows, a musical whose lyrics were written by inner-city children, presented by James Earl Jones; The Passion of Dracula; Spectacular Scandinavia!, featuring ABBA and Victor Borge at Tivoli Gardens; and Richiardi's Chamber of Horror & Illusion, hosted by Vincent Price.

As the new home video business emerged, new production and distribution opportunities emerged. It was now possible to develop a program for a very specific special interest audience, with targeted sponsorship and targeted distribution. One early example was The World's Greatest Photography Course, sponsored by Minolta Camera Corp. with assistance from AgfaPhoto, distributed not through the new home video stores, but through established camera stores—a new idea in the 1980s. Another was the baseball documentary, The Boys of Summer, based upon Roger Kahn's story of the Jackie Robinson-era Brooklyn Dodgers.

By the mid-1980s, new cable networks were sufficiently well-established to support original half-hour series. For Nickelodeon, this path began with Scholastic Productions and Blumenthal for a series called Double Dare. For MTV, the 24/7 format was broken by Remote Control, its first half hour series, developed by Joe DaVola, Lauren Corrao, Michael Duggan and Blumenthal, who appears on the program's credits as "high-priced consultant." International game show formats were emerging as a more modern business, so Blumenthal formed Ashton-Mist Productions with former NBC international marketing executive Gary Wald, resulting in a British series on ITV based upon digital manipulation of images called Perception.

From 1990 until 1994, Blumenthal served as project lead for Where in the World Is Carmen Sandiego?, produced for PBS by WGBH, Boston and WQED, Pittsburgh. Based upon the computer game published by Broderbund, the series presented three "gumshoe" contestants in a fantasy detective office, attempting to track down animated gang members who stole, for example, the Eiffel Tower. The cast included Greg Lee, Lynne Thigpen, and Rockapella. The series was developed and produced by Blumenthal, and co-developed with writer Dorothy Curley and director Dana Calderwood. He also supervised production, and served as story editor, for Cartoon Network's first original series, The Moxy Pirate Show, produced by using then-new motion capture technology, featuring the voices of Bobcat Goldthwait and Penn Jillette.

In 1997, Blumenthal and Calderwood established a new television production company in New York City called Glow in the Dark Productions. Partners included former Carmen Sandiego head writer Charles Nordlander and former Carmen producer Lynn Kestin, along with former Where in Time Is Carmen Sandiego? producer Shirley Abraham. The company produced seven specials for The History Channel under the umbrella title: The Great American History Quiz, featuring nearly 200 celebrities including Bill and Hillary Clinton, Hank Aaron, and B.B. King; two series for Food Network, Pressure Cooker and Taste Test; one series for HBO Family, 30x30 KidFlicks; several pilot programs including work for TV Land and Cinemax, and a syndicated series for Universal Television called Crossing Over with John Edward.

Since 2005, Blumenthal has served as CEO for Independence Media, a Philadelphia-based public television operation that is among the few unaffiliated with PBS. In 2008, Independence Media introduced a new service, MiND: Media Independence. The service is based upon 5-minute programs in rotation throughout the week, similar to the format originally developed for MTV. MiND programs emphasize learning about a wide range of topics, and also emphasize positive aspects of community building. Over 1,000 people have attended MiND's production Boot Camps; some of them have submitted MiND programs currently on the air. The service is also seen in the New York City market, and on the nonprofit organization's internet site.

== Corporate strategy and innovation ==
Within the public television industry, and the commercial media industries, Blumenthal's efforts have focused on reinvention and new opportunities based upon new technologies. As CEO of MiND, he demonstrated the viability of a low-cost, high-impact public media operation. As Executive Director of New Jersey Network, a New Jersey State Authority, and President of the NJN Foundation, which raised money for New Jersey Public Broadcasting, Blumenthal wrote and lectured about the need for new, more contemporary public television models. Previously, Blumenthal was a senior vice president at Bertelsmann (Direct Group), responsible for integration of CDNow, Napster, and record club operations; a senior vice president at CDNow, responsible for media, business development, marketing, and other customer-facing activities; senior vice president of KidSoft, Inc, which provided children and parents with a safe entry in the new personal computing space; and president of Glow in the Dark Productions, a television program supplier in New York City.

== Publications ==
Blumenthal was an active magazine writer, with work published in TV Guide, Stereophile, American Film, Video, Video Review, Crawdaddy!, and other publications. From 1983 until 1997, he wrote The Hi-Tech Home newspaper column, first for The New York Times syndicate and then for United Feature Syndicate. The column reported and commented on consumer electronics products, music, photography, digital literacy, and changes in the media landscape. The column appeared regularly in over 100 newspapers, including the Chicago Sun-Times, The Plain Dealer, St. Louis Post-Dispatch, The Cincinnati Enquirer, and many Gannett papers.

He is the author of more than twenty books about media and culture, including This Business of Television, with attorney and law professor Oliver Goodenough, published by Random House / Billboard Books. Branded for Life examines the role of marketing in daily life, and the sometimes detrimental combination of belief systems, government regulations, corporate activities and the power of brands. The Creative Professional is a business book for the 1 in 30 Americans who earn a living in a creative profession. Both were published by Emmis Books.

He is the co-author of several books, based upon the History Channel series, published by Warner Books under the Great American History Quiz title. Four genre-specific books, The CD Listener's Guides to World Music, Classical Music, Jazz, and Blues, were published by Billboard Books. The Complete Time Traveler: A Tourist's Guide to the Fourth Dimension, was written with Dorothy Curley and Brad Williams, and was among the first illustrated books to be produced with desktop publishing software (Aldus PageMaker, later reworked as Adobe InDesign).

== Education ==
Blumenthal has been affiliated with New School University, The Annenberg School for Communication at University of Pennsylvania, and lectured at MIT, Drexel University, Temple University, and other colleges and universities.
