= Film and television adaptations of video games =

Numerous electronic and video games have been adapted into film and television media, with such adaptations incorporating elements of their narrative, characters, and gameplay.

The first and earliest adaptation of a video game was the American animated series Pac-Man (1982–1983), loosely based on a 1980 Japanese video game of the same name by Toru Iwatani, produced by Hanna-Barbera Productions. Early adaptations were created cheaper and faithfully, such as Saturday Supercade (1983–1984), Pole Position (1984), and Super Mario Bros.: The Great Mission to Rescue Princess Peach! (1986). Television adaptations of video games became more popular in the late 1980s and 1990s, driven by its popularity and generally garnered mixed and positive responses by critics and fans of video games. Quintessentially, the live action game show Where in the World Is Carmen Sandiego? (1991–1995) and its follow-ups of Carmen Sandiego were critically praised and won several Daytime Emmy Awards and a Peabody Award.

The Hollywood film industry began making live-action film adaptations in the mid-1990s, including Super Mario Bros. (1993), Double Dragon, and Street Fighter (both 1994). Most of these films were typically made to capitalize on the popularities of these games, and tried to incorporate the interactivity of a video game to the fixed medium with mixed results, with several of these films being critically panned. While some films in the 2000s and 2010s were received positively and became profitable, many others' poor reviews and box-office failures left game developers hesitant about giving film studios permission to adapt their works.

Film adaptations of video games were revitalized in the late 2010s following the releases of Detective Pikachu (2019) and Sonic the Hedgehog (2020), both critically praised and becoming box-office successes. Video games becoming mainstream with more narrative elements allowed creators to make the films more effective and faithful to the source material, establishing a positive trend for future adaptations. In the 2020s, several video game films were successful at the box office, including The Super Mario Bros. Movie (2023) and A Minecraft Movie (2025). Newer television adaptations since the late 2010s, following similar approaches of focusing on the game's narrative rather than gameplay, drew similar critical praise. These include Castlevania (2017–2021), Arcane (2021–2024), The Last of Us (2023–present), and Fallout (2024–present).

== History ==
=== 1982–1993: Origins ===
==== United States ====
The 1982 American animated series Pac-Man, based on a 1980 Japanese video game of the same name, is claimed to be the earliest adaptation of a video game.

The 1982 animated series Pac-Man, based on a video game of the same name, is claimed to be the first adaptation of a video game. The 1983 anthology series Saturday Supercade was the second to adapt from video games, produced for Saturday mornings by Ruby-Spears Productions, consisting of four 11-minute segments based on various arcade video games including Frogger, Donkey Kong, and Donkey Kong Jr.. In 1984, it was followed by two different adaptations from video games released at the same year: a fantasy animated miniseries Dragon's Lair by Ruby-Spears Productions, based on the 1983 LaserDisc video game of the same name, and a sci-fi action animated miniseries Pole Position by DIC Enterprises and MK Company, loosely based on the 1982 arcade racing video game series of the same name by Namco. The latter made its first time for an adaptation of a video game to win an Emmy Award.

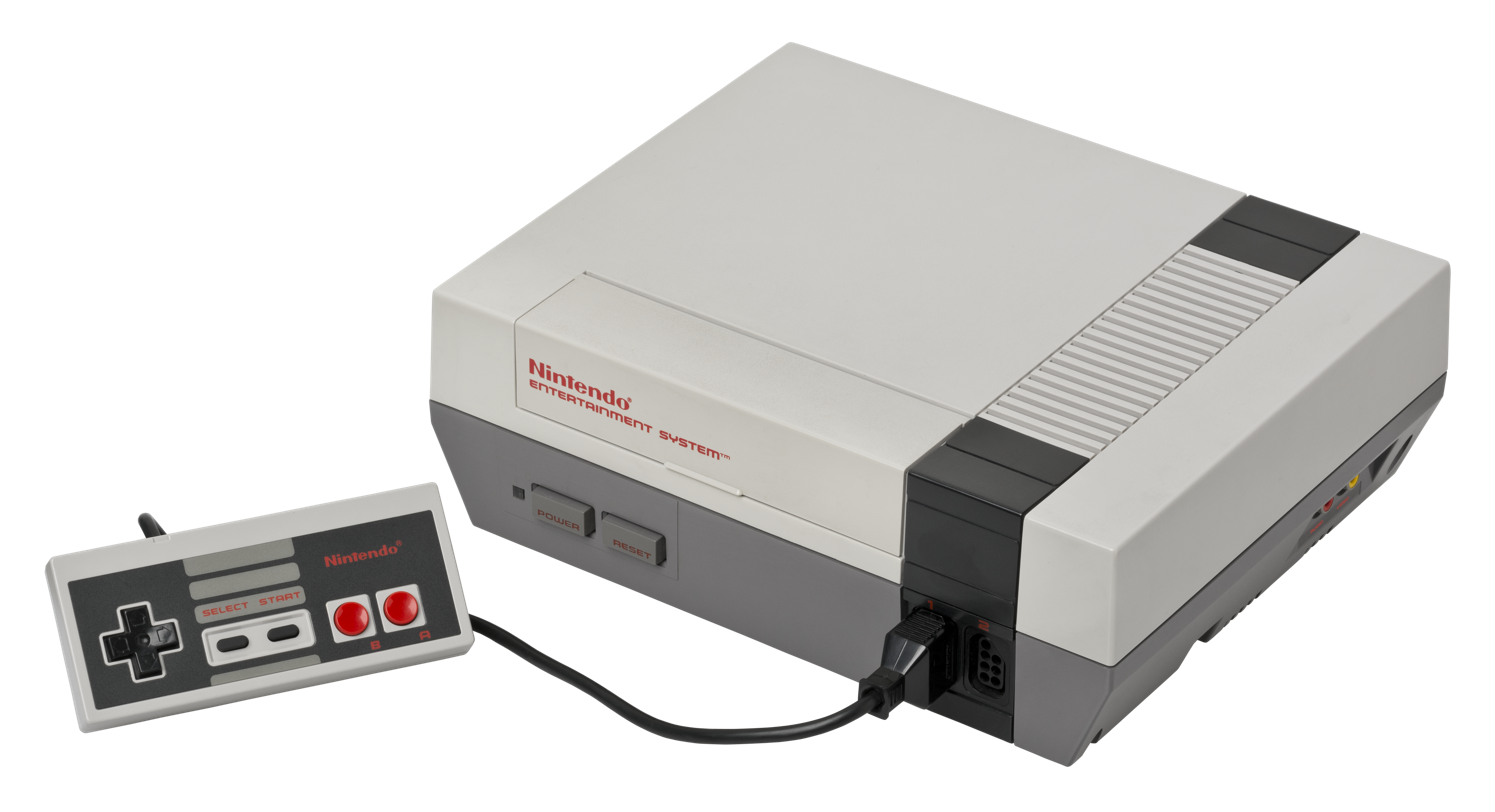
Nintendo is responsible for adapting popular NES games into several animated series started in the 1980s.

After the video game crash of 1983 and its introduction of Nintendo Entertainment System (NES) in the United States in 1985, animated television adaptations of Nintendo video games became more popular in the late-1980s. The Legend of Zelda's first fully adaptation at that time was the animated serial of the same name, loosely follows the two NES Zelda games (the original The Legend of Zelda and The Adventure of Link), from the animated series The Super Mario Bros. Super Show!, mixing settings and characters from those games with original creations. The success of the animated series led to expand more spin-offs of Mario television series including a partially lost variety show King Koopa’s Kool Kartoons, which was nominated as Best Children/Youth Program for the Los Angeles Emmy Awards.

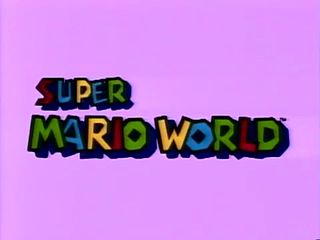
The 1991 animated television series Super Mario World served as the last American series adapted from the Mario video game series.

In the same year, the 1989 animated series Captain N: The Game Master, based on video games released from Nintendo, specifically featuring characters and elements from various popular Nintendo games. It was then proceed to the 1990 animated series The Adventures of Super Mario Bros. 3, loosely based on Super Mario Bros. 3., until the following year, the 1991 animated series Super Mario World, based on the Mario video game series, will be the last animated series to be adapted from Nintendo video games. In addition from adaptations of Nintendo video games, other animated adaptations released in 1993 were the animated series Adventures of Sonic the Hedgehog as well as its related series of the same name, both based on Sonic the Hedgehog by Sega, and the action-adventure animated series Double Dragon, based on the video game series of the same name by Technōs Japan and Tradewest.

Live-action adaptations have not introduced until The Super Mario Bros. Super Show! (1989), which being the first live-action/animated hybrid series, some varied of live-action snippets appeared in most episodes. The first fully live-action television adaptation of a video game was a 1990 sitcom Maniac Mansion by Eugene Levy, loosely based on the 1987 video game of the same name by Lucasfilm Games. It was followed by a children's television game show Where in the World Is Carmen Sandiego?, based on the series of computer games by Broderbund, broadcast by PBS. The game show's first season received critical success and received two Daytime Emmy Awards in 1992, winning once for Outstanding Achievement in Art Direction/Set Decoration/Scenic Design. Over the five seasons it was on the air, the game show won another six Daytime Emmys out of 24 nominations and a Peabody Award, described as "a uniquely creative and influential use of television on a topic of primary importance". It was later succeeded with another game show Where in Time Is Carmen Sandiego? in 1996.

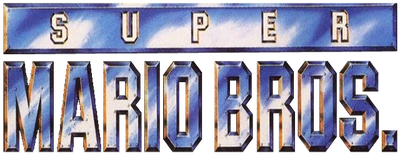
The first theatrical live action film adaptation was the 1993 film Super Mario Bros, responds negatively by critics and Nintendo executives including the game's creator Shigeru Miyamoto.

The first theatrical live-action feature film in the United States, the eponymous Super Mario Bros., was released on May 28, 1993, to both critical and commercial failure, failed to earn back even its $48 million budget in worldwide gross. Critics including Gene Siskel and Roger Ebert of the Chicago Sun-Times criticized the film's lack of faithfulness to the source material. Its failure of a live action film negatively affected Nintendo, Shigeru Miyamoto forced not to license any Nintendo game series, particularly Super Mario Bros. and The Legend of Zelda into the medium in the future, to depart its adaptation property, making both a live-action film Super Mario Bros. and an animated series Super Mario World the last two projects ever released.

==== Japan ====
Japan starts working on films adapted from video games in 1986: two anime films Super Mario Bros.: The Great Mission to Rescue Princess Peach! and Running Boy: Star Soldier's Secret, and a live-action sport short film Game King: Master Takahashi VS Master Mori Clash! Great Battle, were the first three from Family Computer and Nintendo Entertainment System games released on July 20, 1986. Hudson Soft commissioned Star Soldier's Secret and Game King as a double feature to promote Star Soldier, but it was a box office failure and pulled from theaters earlier than anticipated due to clash with Super Mario Bros.; it was later released on VHS containing two films. Super Mario Bros.: The Great Mission to Rescue Princess Peach! was followed by short films and OVA between 1989 and 1995.

The first live-action feature film adapted from a video game in Japan was the 1988 direct-to-video film Mirai Ninja, based on the Namco arcade game of the same name, although the film was premiered in Tokyo on October before the video game was released the following month.

A two-episode OVA titled Tengai Makyō Ziria Oboro-hen (天外魔境 自来也おぼろ変), based on a series of role-playing video games Tengai Makyō by Oji Hiroi and Red Company, was made and released in 1990. A 50-minute adult animated dark fantasy OVA titled Wizardry was produced by TMS Entertainment on February 20, 1991, based on Wizardry: Proving Grounds of the Mad Overlord by Andrew C. Greenberg and Robert Woodhead; the OVA depicts graphic violence and death, a rare feat for any adaptations of video games in the 1990s that introduces complex, mature themes. Between 1991 and 1993, anime films and television series based on Dragon Quest: The Adventure of Dai were released.

=== 1994–2001: Mainstream breakthrough ===
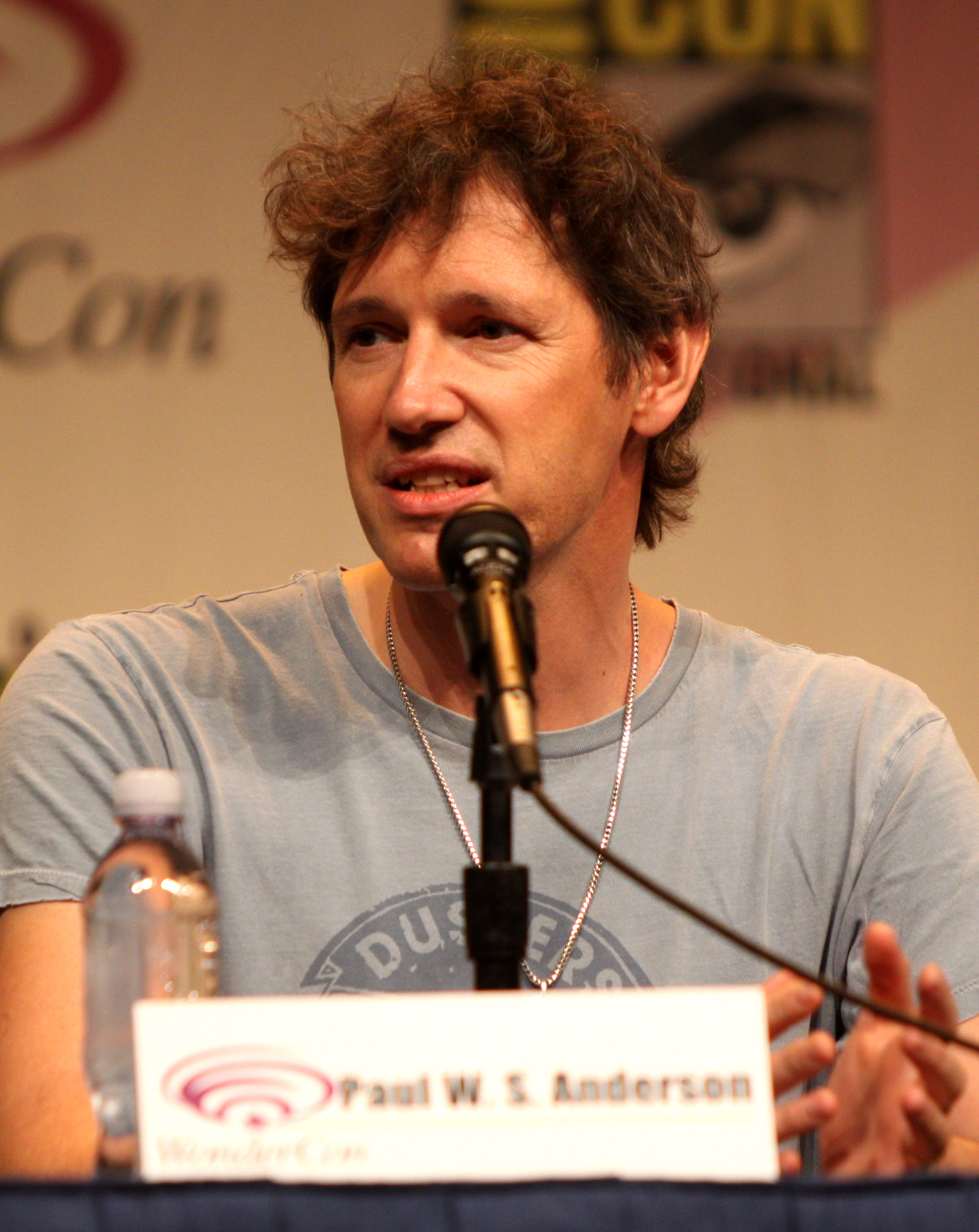
Paul W. S. Anderson (pictured in 2012) directed Mortal Kombat (1995), the first film adaptation of a video game to gain a critical and commercial success.

Super Mario Bros. was followed in 1994 by other adaptations, such as Double Dragon and Street Fighter, which received similarly negative reviews. This changed with the 1995 film Mortal Kombat, directed by Paul W.S. Anderson, which was the first film adaptation of a video game to gain a critical and commercial success, earn more than $100 million at the box office, with Anderson established by critics as a preeminent director of video game films; the film remains one of the highest-rated video game films among critics. Its mainstream success of Mortal Kombat continue to follow their essences for live-action film adaptations include Lara Croft: Tomb Raider (2001), also received moderate commercial success.

Animated films and shows also began gaining mainstream success. Street Fighter II: The Animated Movie (1994), the first fully animated film in the Street Fighter franchise, became a commercial success in both theaters and home video rentals in Japan. The anime series Pokémon (1997–present), based on video game series of the same name by Game Freak, becoming the most successful adaptation of video game of all time, spanning two films, Pokémon: The First Movie (1998) and Pokémon: The Movie 2000 (1999) also became internationally successful. A live-action/animated series Where on Earth Is Carmen Sandiego? garnered critical success and won a Daytime Emmy Award for Outstanding Children's Animated Program.

In 2001, Final Fantasy: The Spirits Within (2001), distributed by Columbia Pictures and directed by Final Fantasy creator Hironobu Sakaguchi, became a major milestone in the history of animation and adaptations of video games, particularly its pioneering and influential achievement of motion-capture to achieve rendered photorealism in computer animation.

=== 2001–2016: Expansion and fluctuations ===
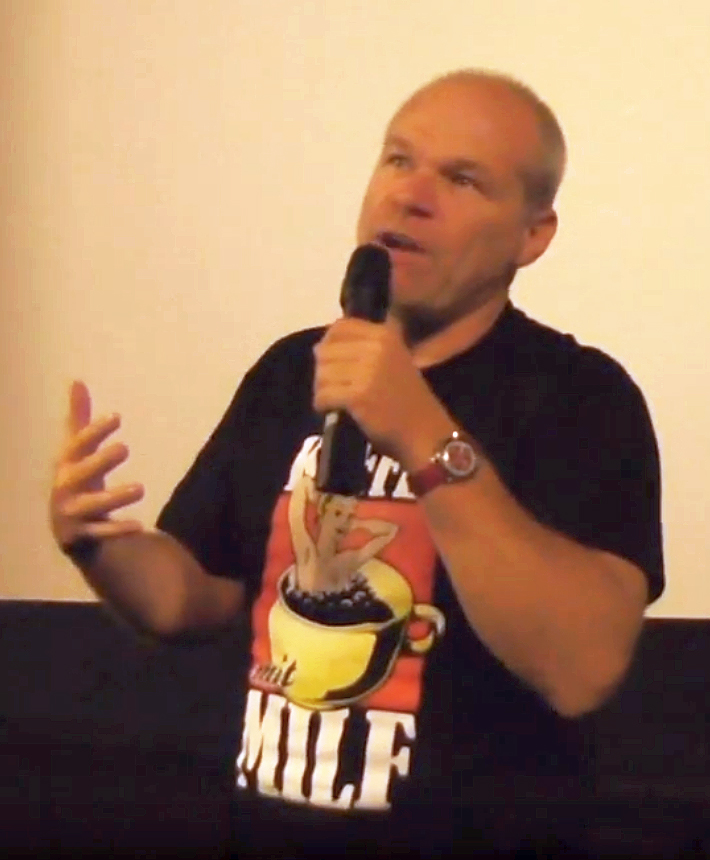
Uwe Boll (pictured in 2016) directed several film adaptations of video games that were panned by critics and considered among the worst films ever made.

Video game film adaptations in Hollywood gained notoriety during this period also due to a large number of films receiving polarizing or panned responses, as well as generally failing to generate enough revenue to cover their production budget. For example Final Fantasy: The Spirits Within encompassed a budget of $137 million, but grossed a total of just $85.1 million becoming one of the lowest revenue-generating adaptations of video games, which resulted in a box office bomb and led to the failure of Square Pictures. Other notable failures include Street Fighter: The Legend of Chun-Li (2009), BloodRayne (2005), Far Cry (2008), and In the Name of the King: A Dungeon Siege Tale (2007), each earning a net loss of over $20 million with In the Name of the King reaching a total loss of $47 million.

Filmmakers like Uwe Boll, a German writer, director, and producer whose works include House of the Dead, Alone in the Dark, and Postal, all of which were almost universally panned by critics and are considered among the worst films ever made. Major game developers, including Hideo Kojima and Blizzard Entertainment, refused to allow Boll from adapting their games into film.

Another director with polarizing results for his adaptions was Paul W. S. Anderson, whose films however managed to find moderate success, particularly the Resident Evil series (2002–2016). Some of the more successful film adaptations during this time include Silent Hill (2006), Hitman (2007), Prince of Persia: The Sands of Time (2010), Need for Speed (2014), The Angry Birds Movie, Assassin's Creed and Warcraft (all three of 2016).

Japanese animation industry expands adaptations of video games with more distinct, controversial genres and themes, particularly visual novels. These included Kanon (2006–2007), Higurashi: When They Cry (2006–2013), Fate/stay night (2006–2015), Clannad (2007–2009) and Steins;Gate (2011–2014). Despite its success of anime adaptations of video games, Yosuga no Sora and School Days, both based on eroge, were highly controversial at the time due to its graphic depiction of sexual content, violence and varied of subject matter (e.g. incest and teenage sexuality).

=== 2017–present: Modern age and critical success ===
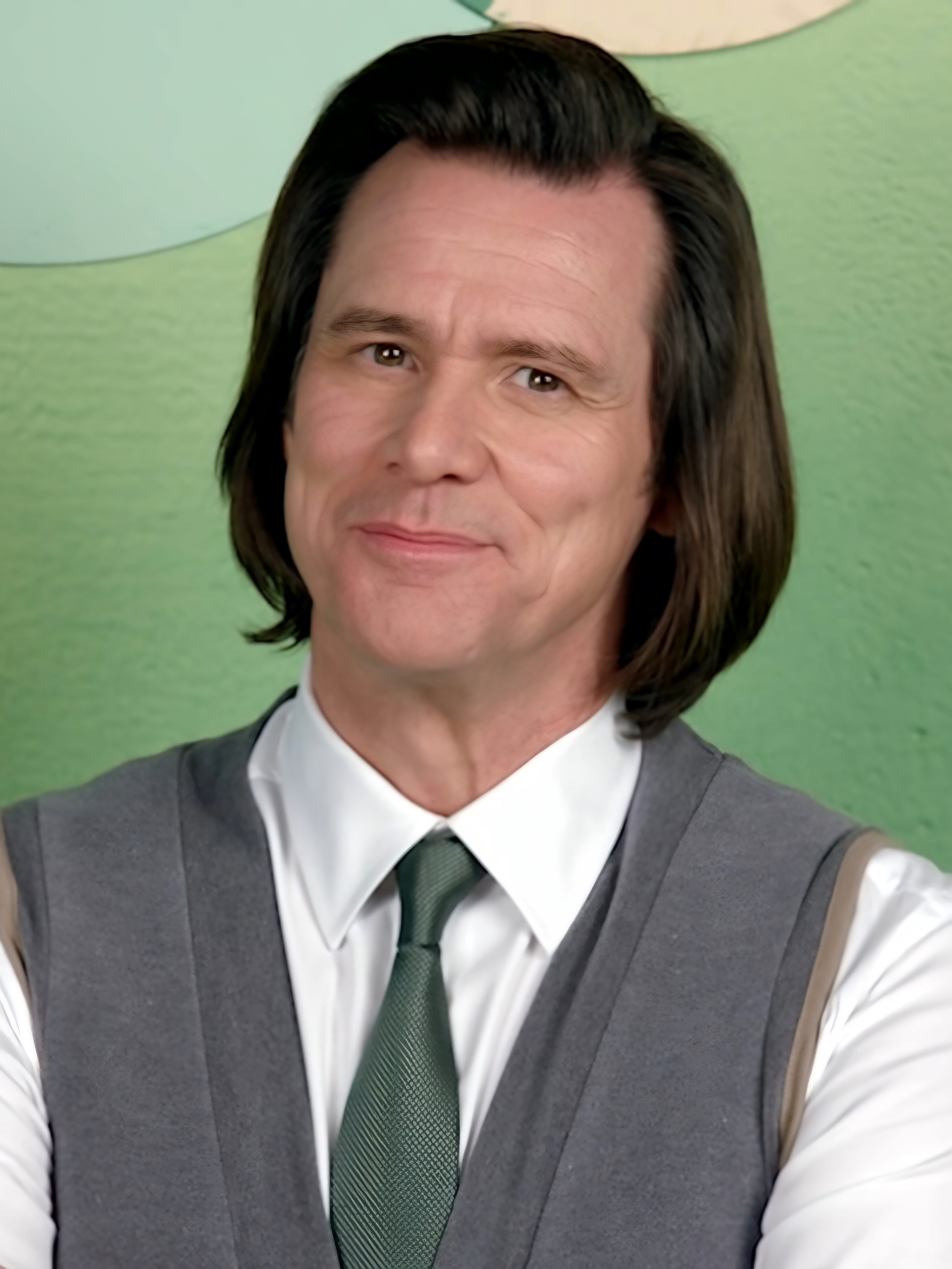
Jim Carrey's role as Dr. Robotnik in the Sonic the Hedgehog film series, which saw critical and commercial successes, revitalized his career in the 2020s.

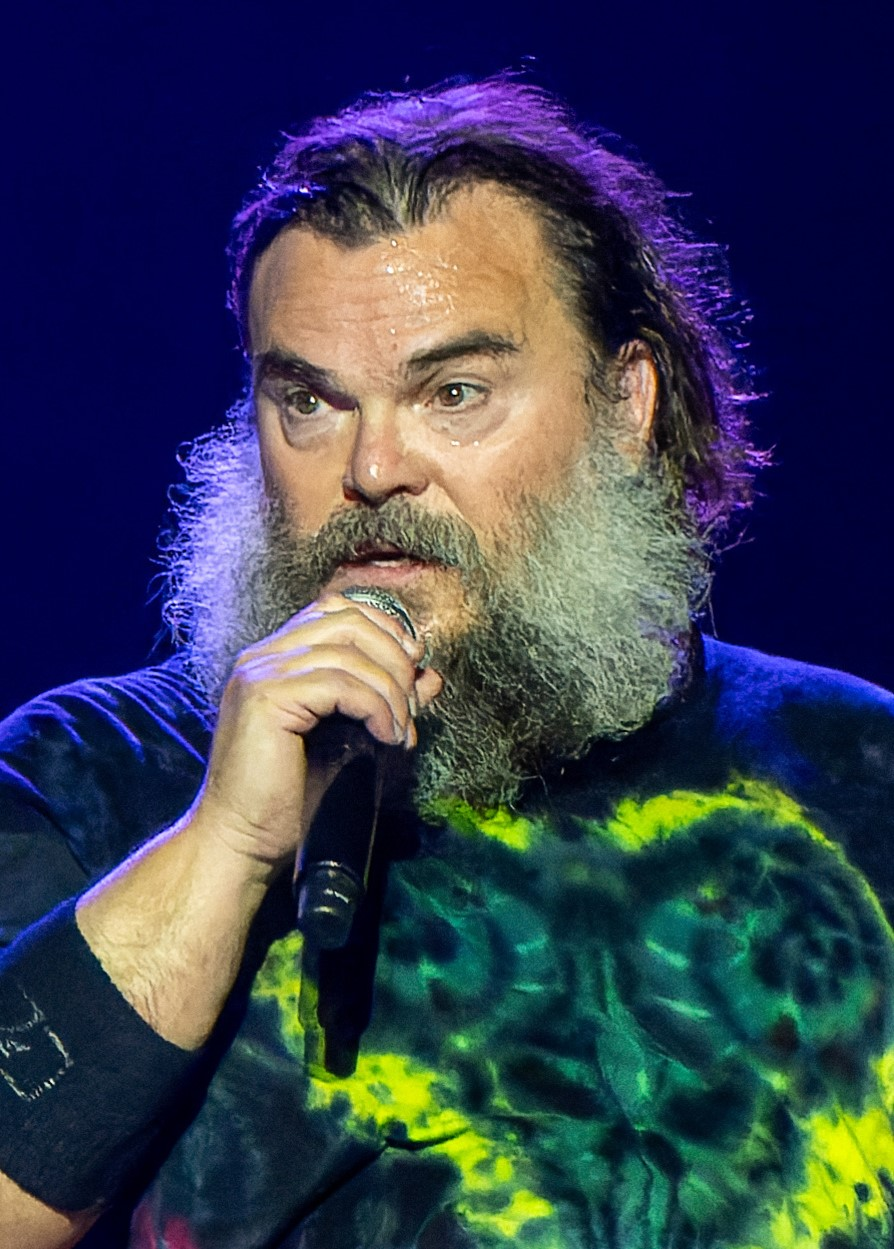
Jack Black voiced Bowser in The Super Mario Bros. Movie and portrayed Steve in A Minecraft Movie; both saw major box-office success in the 2020s.

Observers noted a substantial uptick in the critical and commercial success of video game adaptations in the late 2010s and 2020s. Until 2019, no video game film–live-action or animated–had received a Rotten Tomatoes "fresh" rating, with a score over 60%. Since then, Detective Pikachu, The Angry Birds Movie 2, Gran Turismo, the 3 movies of the Sonic film series, Iron Lung, Mortal Kombat II and Resident Evil have been able to attain a "fresh" rating on Rotten Tomatoes. Both Detective Pikachu and Sonic the Hedgehog posted better-than-expected domestic grosses, with Sonic having the highest domestic opening in 2020. Sonic's success led to two sequels, Sonic the Hedgehog 2 (2022) and Sonic the Hedgehog 3 (2024), and a fourth and event film currently in development. As a result of their success, several video game developers began to operate their own film production companies (e.g. PlayStation Productions) to support IP-based video game films.

The success of newer video game adaptations led to television series using both live-action and animation. Dmitri M. Johnson, co-founder of Story Kitchen, a production company focused on video game adaptations for film and television, said "There was that period in time, pre-Sonic, where it was, 'You're so lucky that Hollywood is even looking at you'", while since then, movie studio look to video games and the studios that make them as potential investments, giving rise to the growth of adaptions in the 2020s. Successful live-action series include The Last of Us (2023–present) and Fallout (2024–present); both were nominated for the Primetime Emmy Award for Outstanding Drama Series, and the former also recognized a Peabody Award, described as "its creative achievements as a feat of cross-media translation, and for setting a new, high watermark for the artistic possibilities of video game adaptations". Successful animated series during this time include Castlevania (2017–2021), Carmen Sandiego (2019–2021), Arcane (2021–2024) and Cyberpunk: Edgerunners (2022).

The newfound success of video game adaptations have been attributed to several factors. For one, the creative people behind these works were more likely to have grown up with interest in video games, driving an enthusiasm to produce an adaptation faithful to the original work. According to Asad Qizilbash, head of PlayStation Productions, these adaptations work best when they are "respecting the medium and then using the source material as a guide versus a rule book". Video games have become more cinematic with the use of cutscenes and similar narrative elements, giving more material to build adaptations on. Another reason arises from the prevalence of video games in the broader media by the 2010s. The general familiarity with video games make adaptations less of a risk for film and television production groups, according to Qizilbash. Many of these adaptations, such as The Super Mario Bros. Movie and Sonic the Hedgehog, are aimed for younger audiences or families, rather than the typical young adult demographics for video games as whole which prior adaptations tended to focus on. However, other video game adaptations with a more narrow audience have also been successful such as Five Nights at Freddy's, which was aimed for Generation Z male demographic.

Successful adaptations of video games have also drawn more players to the source game, such as the case with Cyberpunk: Edgerunners for Cyberpunk 2077 (2020), and Fallout for the game series.

== Reception ==
=== Critics and developers' response ===
Similar to comic book-based films in the past, adaptations tended to carry a reputation of lackluster quality and receive negative reaction from both film critics and fans of the source material. This is generally due to difficulties in adopting a story meant to be played interactively into a linear movie-going experience.

Shigeru Miyamoto, creator of Nintendo franchises including Mario and Zelda, said in a 2007 interview:

I think that part of the problem with translating games to movies is that the structure of what makes a good game is very different from the structure of what makes a good movie. Movies are a much more passive medium, where the movie itself is telling a story and you, as the viewer, are relaxing and taking that in passively. Whereas video games are a much more active medium where you are playing along with the story. ... I think that video games, as a whole, have a very simple flow in terms of what's going on in the game. We make that flow entertaining by implementing many different elements to the video game to keep the player entertained. Movies have much more complex stories, or flow, to them, but the elements that affect that flow are limited in number. So I think that because these surrounding elements in these two different mediums vary so greatly, when you fail to take that into account then you run into problems.

In an interview with Fortune in August 2015, Miyamoto said, "Because games and movies seem like similar mediums, people's natural expectation is we want to take our games and turn them into movies. … I've always felt video games, being an interactive medium, and movies, being a passive medium, mean the two are quite different."

Roger Ebert of the Chicago Sun-Times stated that video games are "inherently inferior to film and literature" and that "video games by their nature require player choices, which is the opposite of the strategy of serious film and literature, which requires authorial control."

=== Revenue ===
Though video game films are generally critically panned, they tend to do well at the box office, especially in the international one. The Super Mario Bros. Movie, based on the Mario franchise, holds the highest total of any video game adaptation with US$1.36 billion, and was considered the most profitable film of 2023 by Deadline Hollywood, while together with its sequel The Super Mario Galaxy Movie it's also the highest grossing film franchise with a US$2.4 billion total. The six Resident Evil films hold instead the highest gross for a live-action series of US$1.2 billion, with an average production budget between US$30 to 50 million for each movie. Other franchises over the billion mark are Pokémon with US$1.5 billion, and the trilogy of Sonic the Hedgehog movies. A Minecraft Movie opened in April 2025 to over $313 million on its first weekend, the highest for a video game movie to date and breaking several other box office records.

Only nine films have grossed more than $400 million in the box office worldwide: Warcraft (2016), Rampage (2018), Detective Pikachu (2019), Uncharted (2022), Sonic the Hedgehog 2 (2022), The Super Mario Bros. Movie (2023), Sonic the Hedgehog 3 (2024), A Minecraft Movie (2025), and The Super Mario Galaxy Movie (2026), with The Super Mario Bros. Movie becoming the first video game film to ever pass the $1 billion mark, making it one of the top 50 highest-grossing films of all time.

== Accolades ==
=== Emmy Awards ===
Television adaptations of video games that have won or been nominated at the Emmy Awards, including the Primetime Emmy Awards, Daytime Creative Arts Emmy Awards, Children's and Family Emmy Awards, International Emmy Awards, and Regional Emmys.

==== Primetime Emmys ====
- Halo 4: Forward Unto Dawn was nominated Outstanding Main Title Design at the 65th Primetime Creative Arts Emmy Awards.
- The first season of Carmen Sandiego was nominated Outstanding Children's Program and Outstanding Individual Achievement in Animation at the 71st Primetime Creative Arts Emmy Awards, winning only the latter.
- The first season of Gangs of London was nominated Outstanding Stunt Performance at the 73rd Primetime Creative Arts Emmy Awards.
- Arcane won two Outstanding Animated Program and five Outstanding Individual Achievement in Animation at the Primetime Creative Arts Emmy Awards.
- The first season of The Last of Us received five nominations at the 75th Primetime Emmy Awards, including Outstanding Drama Series, and nineteen at the Creative Arts Emmy Awards, with a leading eight wins at the latter. The second season received three nominations at the 77th Primetime Emmy Awards and fourteen at the Creative Arts Emmy Awards, winning once from the latter.
- The first season of Fallout received three nominations at the 76th Primetime Emmy Awards, including for Outstanding Drama Series, along with thirteen at the Creative Arts Emmy Awards, winning the award for Outstanding Music Supervision. The second season received ten nominations at the 78th Primetime Creative Arts Emmy Awards.
- Silent Hill: Ascension won Outstanding Emerging Media Program at the 76th Primetime Creative Arts Emmy Awards, while Twisted Metal was nominated for Outstanding Stunt Coordination for Comedy Programming.
- The first season of Twisted Metal was nominated Outstanding Stunt Coordination at the 76th Primetime Creative Arts Emmy Awards.
- Secret Level was nominated Outstanding Sound Editing for a Comedy or Drama Series (Half-Hour) and Animation at the 77th Primetime Emmy Awards.

==== Daytime Emmys ====
- Pole Position won Outstanding Sound Mixing at the 12th Daytime Emmy Awards.
- Where in the World Is Carmen Sandiego? received twenty-six nominations, including five consecutive nominations of Outstanding Children's Series, overall in five seasons at the Daytime Emmys, winning Outstanding Achievement in Art Direction/Set Decoration/Scenic Design five times (1992–1993; 1995–1997) and an Outstanding Live and Tape Sound Mixing (1996).
- Where on Earth Is Carmen Sandiego? received nine nominations overall in two seasons at the Daytime Emmy Awards, winning once for Outstanding Children's Animated Program.
- Where in Time Is Carmen Sandiego? received thirteen nominations in two seasons at the Daytime Emmy Awards, winning once for Outstanding Lighting Direction.
- Tak and the Power of Juju won Outstanding Sound Editing for an Animated Program at the 36th Daytime Emmy Awards.
- Skylanders Academy was nominated Outstanding Performer in an Animated Program at the 45th Daytime Emmy Awards.
- Fruit Ninja: Frenzy Force won Outstanding Interactive Media for a Daytime Program at the 45th Daytime Emmy Awards.
- The second season of Carmen Sandiego received four nominations, including Outstanding Special Class Animated Program, winning Outstanding Individual Achievement in Animation at the 47th Daytime Creative Arts Emmy Awards.
- Carmen Sandiego: To Steal or Not to Steal was nominated Outstanding Interactive Media for a Daytime Program at the 48th Daytime Creative Arts Emmy Awards.

==== Children's and Family Emmys ====
- The third season of Carmen Sandiego was nominated Outstanding Directing for an Animated Program at the inaugural Children's and Family Emmy Awards.
- The Cuphead Show! received four nominations at the inaugural Children's and Family Emmy Awards, winning an Individual Achievement in Animation and Outstanding Directing for an Animated Program.
- Sonic Prime won an Individual Achievement in Animation at the 2nd Children's and Family Emmy Awards.

==== Other Emmy awards ====
- King Koopa’s Kool Kartoons was nominated as Best Children/Youth Program for the Los Angeles Emmy Awards in 1992.
- Digimon Xros Wars: The Boy Hunters Who Leapt Through Time and Rabbids Invasion were nominated International Emmy Award for Best Kids: Animation.

==== Multiple awards and nominations from Emmy ====
Video game / franchise	Television series / special	Divisions	Nominations	Awards
Carmen Sandiego	Where in the World Is Carmen Sandiego?; Where in Time Is Carmen Sandiego?; Where on Earth Is Carmen Sandiego?; Carmen Sandiego; Carmen Sandiego: To Steal or Not to Steal	Primetime (Netflix; season 1); Daytime; Children's and Family (Netflix; season 3)	59 (Note: World with 26 nominations, Time with 14, Earth and Carmen Sandiego with nine each, and To Steal or Not to Steal with one)	11 (Note: World with six wins, Carmen Sandiego with three, and Earth and Time with one each)
The Last of Us	The Last of Us (season 1, season 2)	Primetime	41	9
Fallout	Fallout (season 1, season 2)	Primetime	17	2
League of Legends	Arcane	Primetime	9	8
Cuphead	The Cuphead Show!	Children's and Family	4	2

=== Other awards ===
Cyberpunk: Edgerunners won the Anime of the Year at the 7th Crunchyroll Anime Awards.

Some films have been awarded or nominated from major organizations such as Golden Globe Awards and The Game Awards. The Super Mario Bros. Movie was nominated for three Golden Globes (Best Animated Feature, Best Original Song, and Cinematic Achievement) and the Producers Guild of America Award for Best Animated Motion Picture.

Conversely, some adaptations received a poor reputation and garnered Razzie and other worst-contender awards. Pokémon: The First Movie received six Stinkers Bad Movie Awards nominations including a dishonorable mention of Worst Film, winning twice for Worst Achievement in Animation and Most Unwelcome Direct-to-Video Release, the latter shared with other eight Pokémon videos were released in 1999. BloodRayne and Borderlands were nominated the Golden Raspberry Award for Worst Picture. Uwe Boll also awarded a rare "Worst Career Achievement" and Worst Director awards at the 29th Golden Raspberry Awards for In the Name of the King and Postal.

== See also ==
- List of films based on video games
- List of television series based on video games
- List of animated series based on video games
- List of anime based on video games
- List of highest-grossing films based on video games
- Category:Lists of works based on video games
- Category:Video games adapted for other media
