= Urban Blight (band) =

Urban Blight was a New York City band. The seven-member group played a distinctive style of music with various influences, including ska, reggae, rock, funk, R&B and pop.

The group had two major releases: Playgrounds 'n' Glass (1992) and All the Way Live '95, recorded in New York City, as well as 3 singles ("My House/Ready for You" (1980), "Magic Six/Becky" (1982), and "Peacetrain/Peacedub" (1984)) and two Eps ("My Side of The Fence" (1983), and "From the Westside to the Eastside" (1987)). The band and various members have appeared on recordings by The Fleshtones, The Toasters, Beastie Boys, Bob Dylan and David Yazbek, including a guest appearance on the Where in the World is Carmen Sandiego? soundtrack album with the song "Beautiful Place (NYC)".

According to the group's official website, they were last active in 1998 but occasionally reunite to perform concerts, the last two being a shows at NYC's Canal Room and a CMA fundraiser at Webster Hall. Two of the members, Paul Vercesi and Kevin Batchelor (who guested on trumpet with the band when not touring with Steel Pulse, Sister Carol, Skatalites) played instruments in the Broadway production of The Full Monty by David Yazbek, composer for the Carmen Sandiego show.

The band was formed in Greenwich Village in the early 1970s by Nelson Keene Carse, Wyatt Sprague, and Jere Faison (among others), and other members added to their feat were Tony Orbach, Dan Lipman, Jamie Carse and Paul Vercesi, all from Greenwich Village and IS 70, in 1978. The band played their first big shows at Stuyvesant High School (where Orbach, Lipman, Carse and Vercesi attended 1977-1980) and auditioned at CBGBs in January 1980, eventually playing there over 20 times and setting the house attendance record in November 1982 upon the band's return from a tour of Holland. After CBGBs the band moved to the larger Ritz on East 11th St. Soon after they were opening for acts such as UB40 (3 times), Thompson Twins, Terence Trent D'Arby and Bad Manners. They played support slots at Pier 84 (with The Alarm) and Nassau Coliseum (with Duran Duran). The band recorded the dance track "Peacetrain/Peacedub" in 1984, which was remixed by Mark Kamins. The Beastie Boys opened for Urban Blight at the Ritz in October 1985. Northeast tours and a victory in the WLIR Battle of the Bands in 1985 landed the band a trip to the UK (where they had toured twice, playing London's Dingwall's and Marquee). In 1987 they recorded "From the Westside to The Eastside." 1992's "Playgrounds 'n Glass", produced by Keene Carse and UB, was the band's first full-length CD, and is a mighty representation of the varied styles - rock, funk, reggae, ska, and a live track - the band often incorporated.

Though the band had been solidified and anchored on drums by Brandon Finley, a top DC go-go kinsman since 1993, by 1994 the band had taken on three new members, Vere Isaac, Kevin Batchelor and Jon Vercesi, (with help from associates including Clark Gayton). They continued to play until curtailing touring and recording in 1996. During the last years the band recorded soundtrack music for Seth Zvi Rosenfeld's "Brother's Kiss" as well as HBO's "Subway Stories", among other projects.

The Urban Blight Horns continued to work with various artists, including Queen Latifah, Beastie Boys, Lisa Stansfield, Bad Brains, Common, Dog Eat Dog, and are still active today, appearing live and on record with R&B and rock groups around NYC.
