= Greg Lee (actor) =

American actor

- Born: March 3, 1962 (age 64); Hebron, Nebraska, U.S.
- Occupations: Actor, comedian
- Years active: 1989–present

Greg Lee (born March 3, 1962) is an American actor and comedian.

== Biography ==
Lee was born in Hebron, Nebraska. He attended York College in York, Nebraska, and Oklahoma Christian University in Oklahoma City in the early 1980s. Lee co-hosted (with Molly Scott) Nickelodeon's variety show Total Panic from 1989 to 1990. From 1990 to 1991, he stayed on Nickelodeon to be an announcer for another show, Outta Here! He is best known for his roles as ACME's Special (later Senior) Agent in Charge of Training New Recruits on Where in the World Is Carmen Sandiego? and as the voice of Mayor/Principal White on Doug. Lee got his start acting in television commercials and bit parts in different films and TV shows. He worked as a contestant coordinator on Double Dare. Lee currently is a player with Tokens, a variety show from Nashville, Tennessee, that performs at the Ryman Auditorium. His character is Brother Preacher. He was also hired for the pilot episode of the show NewsRadio. Ray Romano was originally hired for the part, but he was fired before filming began. Joe Rogan was hired to replace Romano and went on to star after the pilot.

== Filmography ==
| Year | Title | Role | Notes |
|---|---|---|---|
| 1989 | Total Panic | Himself (host) | Game show |
| 1990 | Sesame Street Visits The Firehouse | Firefighter | Made a cameo appearance as a firefighter. Did not speak, but sang a part of a song in the video. |
| 1990–1991 | Outta Here! | Himself (announcer) | Game show |
| 1991–1995 | Where in the World is Carmen Sandiego? | Himself (host) & Other Various Informants | Game show |
| 1991–1999 | Doug | Mayor/Principal White | Voice role |
| 1993 | Ghostwriter | Mr. Aucoin | 3 episodes, "Who is Max Mouse?" arc |
| 1995 | NewsRadio | Rick | Pilot episode |
| 1995–1996 | Nitro! | Himself (host) | Game show |
| 1999 | Doug's 1st Movie | Mayor/Principal White | Voice role, film |
| 2000 | The Drew Carey Show | Crazy Al | 1 episode, "Kate Works for Drew" |
| 2000 | The Giving Tree | Man in Bed | Film |
| 2001 | The District | Father | 1 episode, "Melt Down" |
| 2004 | Chaos Theory | Motel Man | Short film |
| 2005 | George Lopez | Rob | 1 episode, "George's Extreme Makeover: Holmes Edition" |
| 2006 | Eye of the Dolphin | Principal McGowan | Drama film |
| 2010 | Beneath the Blue | WLF Leader | Sequel to Eye of the Dolphin |
| 2011 | Killer | Shades | Short film |
| 2013 | The Between | Jay | Film based on the novel of the same name |
| 2019 | Lost Treasure of the Valley | The Adventurer | Short film |

== Discography ==
- Where in the World Is Carmen Sandiego? (1992)
- Carmen Sandiego: Out of This World (1994)
