= Gene Mackles =

American designer and artist

Gene Mackles is an American artist and composer who worked for public television and now develops board games.

== Early life and education ==
Mackles studied piano and music theory at the Juilliard School, and in 1968 he graduated from Dartmouth College with a degree in Fine Arts.

== Career ==
=== Television ===
Mackles worked for WGBH Boston as a graphic designer. Between 1970 and 1993 he worked for the station and composed theme music, developed game show pilots, created animated bumpers, and designed program branding and logos.

As senior designer at WGBH, Mackles was responsible for the station's on-air image including logos, program intros, animated segments, and marketing material. Notable credits include the station's logo and the universal symbol used to designate the closed captioning system as developed by The Caption Center at WGBH. Gene also worked on programs such as NOVA, Evening at Pops, and Zoom. In 1993, he received an Emmy nomination for Outstanding Achievement in Graphics and Title Design for his work as designer and animation director for “Where in the World is Carmen Sandiego?" Mackles was an original developer of their "Ready to Learn" service.

Mackles later designed and produced work for stations and clients including NBC Sports, HGTV, The Food Network, The History Channel and The Cleveland Orchestra.

Mackles also paints oil paintings.

=== Game design ===
Mackles' game design company, PDG Games, has produced a dozen games since 2012.

As a game designer, Mackles has self-produced a steady stream of work that includes Iota, a tile sorting game that won the Mensa Select Award in 2012. Soon after, his game was picked up for production by Gamewright. Gamewright now distributes another of Gene's games, Splurt!.

Mackles tried to purchase a "Progress" poster on eBay because he liked the image and felt it would become important one day.
