= Pauline Martin =

Canadian actress and television personality

- Born: April 19, 1952 (age 73); Trois-Pistoles, Quebec
- Occupation: Actress

Pauline Martin (born April 19, 1952) is a Canadian film actress and television personality known for appearing in the 1989 film Jesus of Montreal.

She was born in Trois-Pistoles, Quebec, with her family moving to Chicoutimi in 1956. In 1976, she co-hosted the CBC Television series Une fenêtre dans ma tête, with Yvan Ponton. She joined the cast of Denys Arcand's Jesus of Montreal, and was nominated for the Genie Award for Best Supporting Actress.

She also played the role of "The Chief" on the French-Canadian version of Where in the World is Carmen Sandiego?, entitled Mais, où se cache Carmen Sandiego? (But, Where is Carmen Sandiego Hiding?).
