= Billy Straus =

American music producer and songwriter

- Occupation: Music producer

Billy Straus is an American music producer and songwriter. He is known for his work in children's television including the Disney series Little Einsteins, Where in the World Is Carmen Sandiego?, the two PBS children's animated television series Bob the Builder and WordWorld. He produced and mixed original Broadway cast albums for The Full Monty and Dirty Rotten Scoundrels, both of which earned him Grammy Award nominations. He won an Emmy Award for his work on Where in the World Is Carmen Sandiego? He founded Rock River Communications to introduce the concept of non-traditional music distribution into the retail marketplace.

== Career ==
Straus was raised in New York City. While enrolled at Brown University in 1978, Straus started working as a recording engineer, recording live albums and broadcasts for artists such as George Jones, Miles Davis, Grateful Dead and Joni Mitchell. He was a member of the band Redline during the early 1980s and toured with U2 in 1981.

Straus worked as an engineer at The Hit Factory recording studio in Manhattan, working with artists including Bruce Springsteen and Julian Lennon. In 1985 he started The Manhattan Recording Company, where he created The Manhattan Jazz Hour radio series, hosted by The New York Times jazz critic, John S. Wilson, and syndicated nationally by American Public Radio. Straus also composed and produced jingles for Miller Brewing Company and Mars, Incorporated. He produced for the a cappella musical group Rockapella in the late 1980s and 1990s including two albums spun off from the PBS television series, Where in the World Is Carmen Sandiego? for which he won an Emmy Award.

Straus founded Rock River Communications in 1995 in Manhattan. The company later moved to Brattleboro, Vermont and also has an office in California. Rock River was an innovator in non-traditional music distribution, creating music collections for sale through non-music retailers. Rock River's first such music collection, Pottery Barn: A Cool Christmas, was released in 1995. Straus subsequently produced 44 additional collections for Pottery Barn and, through the Rock River label, released over 124 compilations. Straus produced Street Mix for Volkswagen as well as music for other retailers such as Gap Inc., W Hotels, Jaguar Cars and Jose Cuervo.

Straus has composed and produced music for children's television series on Nickelodeon, PBS and Walt Disney Television, including Dora the Explorer, Out of the Box and Gullah Gullah Island. Straus wrote the songs for the animated television series, Little Einsteins, in 2005, Bob the Builder and WordWorld.

In 2003, Straus wrote music and lyrics for Rock Odyssey, a musical adaptation of Homer's Odyssey. His song, Change in My Life, originally recorded by Rockapella, appeared in the Steve Martin film, Leap of Faith, in 1992. In 2007, Straus served as executive producer of Roots, Rock, Remixed, a collection of remixes of reggae legend Bob Marley's earliest recordings, and two volumes of Christmas Remixed: Holiday Classics Re-Grooved.

In 1999 Straus launched Websound to provide internet radio for websites.

He is a co-founder of the non-profit, Next Stage Arts Project.

== Awards and recognition ==
In 2001 Straus and collaborator David Yazbek were nominated for a Grammy Award for producing the original Broadway cast album, The Full Monty, in the category of Best Musical Show Album. Dirty Rotten Scoundrels, which Straus also produced with Yazbek, was also nominated for a Grammy Award in the same category in 2005.

Straus won an Emmy Award for Outstanding Achievement in Live and Direct To Tape Sound Mixing for Where in the World Is Carmen Sandiego? in 1996.

== Personal life ==
Straus currently lives with his family and dog, Ziggy, in Vermont. He is a volunteer emergency medical technician. He is the brother-in-law of economist and policy maker Paul Weinstein.

== Works ==
=== Selected discography ===
- Russell Kaback: Message of Love (2013) – Producer, engineer
- Bob Marley: Roots, Rock, Remixed (2007) – Producer
- Dirty Rotten Scoundrels - Broadway Cast Recording (2005) Producer, mixer
- Shawn Colvin: Oh Little Town of Bethlehem (2003) – Producer, arranger with T-Bone Wolk
- Sean Altman: alt.mania (2002) – Producer, engineer
- The Full Monty - Broadway Cast Recording (2000) – Producer, mixer
- Rockapella: Out Cold (1999) – Producer, engineer
- Where in the World is Carmen Sandiego? (1996) - Songwriter, producer, engineer
- Falling Over You (1995) - with Sean Altman - Songwriter
- XTC: Cherry In Your Tree (1994) - Engineer, mixer
- Carmen Sandiego: Out of This World (1994) – Songwriter, producer, engineer
- Leap Of Faith: Soundtrack (1992) – Songwriter, arranger
- Donald Brown: Early Bird (1988) – Engineer
- The Hanoi Hilton Soundtrack (1987) – Engineer
- Bruce Springsteen: Born in the USA (1984) – Engineer

=== Filmography ===
- License to Wed (2007) – Songwriter
- Office Killer (1997) – Song performer
- Joe's Apartment (1996) – Actor
- Leap of Faith (1992) – Songwriter
- The Hanoi Hilton (1987)

=== Television ===
- Little Einsteins (2005–2006) – composer/lyricist
- Dora the Explorer (2000–2002) – Composer/lyricist
- Out of the Box (1998) – Composer/lyricist
- Where in the World Is Carmen Sandiego? (1996)
- Gullah Gullah Island (1995–1997) – composer/lyricist
- Capitol Steps Comedy Campaign – Composer/lyricist
- WordWorld
- Bob the Builder (1998–2004) – composer/lyricist (Uncredited)
