= John S. Wilson (music critic) =

American music critic (1913–2002)

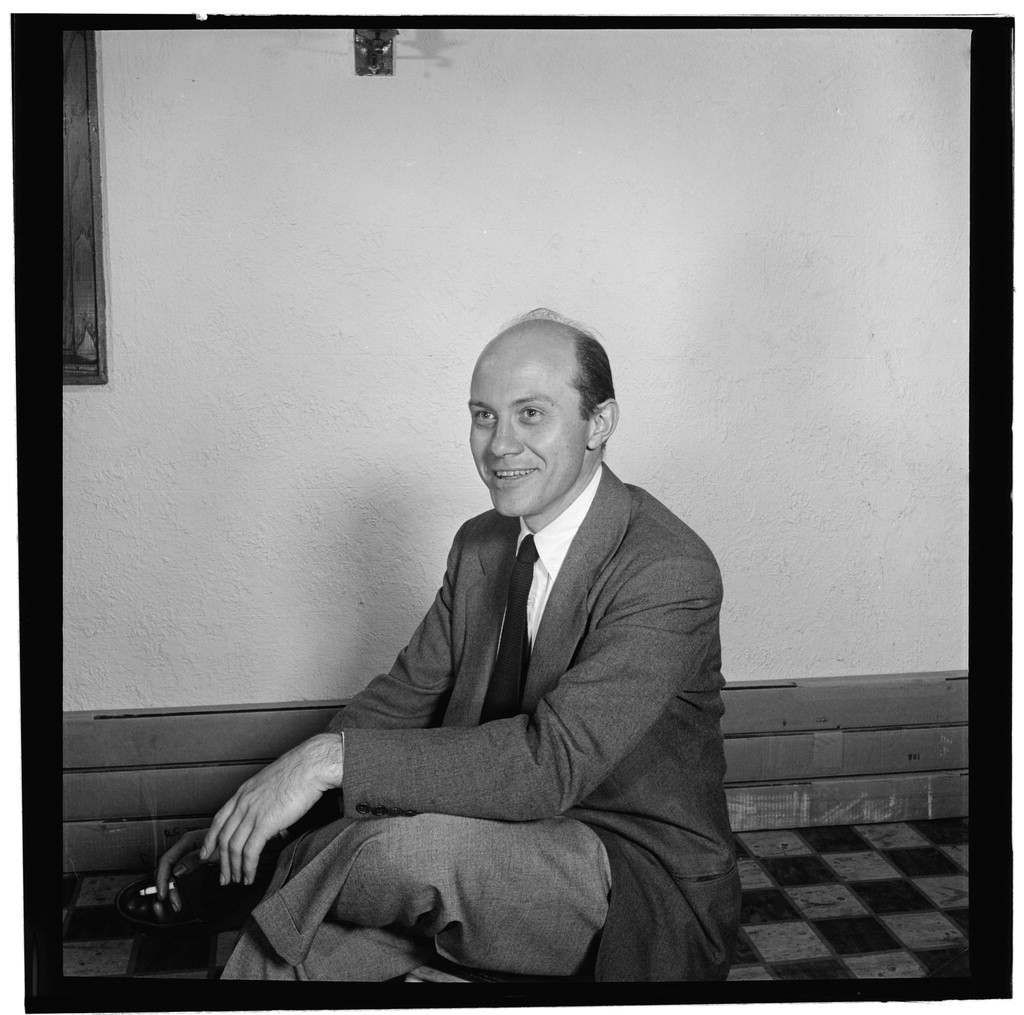
- Wilson, ca. 1940
- Born: January 6, 1913; Elizabeth, New Jersey, U.S.
- Died: August 27, 2002 (aged 89); Princeton, New Jersey, U.S.
- Education: Wesleyan University; Columbia University
- Occupation: Music critic
- Spouses: Catherine Beecher (briefly in the 1930s); Susan Barnes (m. 1950; died 1981); Mary Moris Schmidt (m. 1983)
- Children: 2
- Writing career
- Subjects: Music criticism, radio host

John Steuart Wilson (January 6, 1913 – August 27, 2002) was an American music critic and jazz radio host. He worked as a music critic for The New York Times for four decades, and was that paper's first critic to write regularly on jazz and other genres of popular music.

== Biography ==
Born in Elizabeth, New Jersey, Wilson attended Newark Academy High School and then Wesleyan University. He earned his master's degree in journalism at Columbia University. Wilson hosted the nationally syndicated jazz performance radio series, The Manhattan Jazz Hour, which included the artists Phil Woods, Toots Thielemans, Dick Hyman, Sir Roland Hanna, Jim Hall, Joe Williams, Milt Hinton, and other jazz luminaries. The series was taped at The Manhattan Recording Company studio in New York City in 1986 and syndicated nationally by American Public Radio. Wilson interviewed the artists, who also performed live in front of a studio audience for the series.

Wilson died in Princeton, New Jersey, at the age of 89.

== Bibliography ==
- Wilson, John S. (1958). Collector's Jazz: Traditional and Swing. J. B. Lippincott & Co. ASIN B000ZT0MYU.
- Wilson, John S. (1959). The Collector's Jazz: Modern. J. B. Lippincott & Co. ASIN B009T8CJ8A.
