= List of School Days episodes =

School Days DVD volume 1.

School Days is an anime television series based on the visual novel of the same name. The series was produced by TNK as a twelve-episode television series and two direct-to-video (OVA) releases. The series premiered on July 3, 2007, on TV Kanagawa and aired its final episode on September 26 on AT-X. Other stations that broadcast the series included Chiba TV, TV Aichi, TV Osaka and TV Saitama.

The series follows the life of Makoto Itou, a first-year high school student who becomes the ambivalent love-interest of several girls during his second term, and the effects it has on himself and his relationships.

On September 17, 2007, on the eve of the series' finale on TV Kanagawa, a 16-year-old girl murdered her father (a 45-year-old police officer) in their Kyoto home with an axe. In response, TV Kanagawa cancelled the Tuesday airing of the finale for its similarly violent subject matter, and most other stations followed suit (with the exception of AT-X, who remained indecisive). AT-X announced the following week that the network had elected to air the finale on September 27 and October 1.

From September 26, 2007, to February 27, 2008, School Days was published into six limited and regular edition DVDs that contained two episodes each. The first direct-to-video episode, "Valentine Days" was bundled with limited edition copies of School Days L×H, with the second episode, "Magical Heart Kokoro-chan", following on on March 6, 2008.

== Episodes ==
No.	Title	Directed by	Written by	Original release date
1	"Confession"; Transliteration: "Kokuhaku" (Japanese: 告白)	Keitarō Motonaga	Makoto Uezu	July 3, 2007
On a train ride to school, Makoto Ito, a first-year high school student, takes notice of Kotonoha Katsura, an attractive schoolmate who he finds commutes with him. Infatuated with but unable to approach her, he sets his cellphone wallpaper with her photograph as a charm, content with watching her from afar. During the rearrangement of homeroom, Sekai Saionji, his new desk partner, notices the picture, and offers to help get the two of them together. Through her they become friends, and it is shortly after that Makoto confesses to Kotonoha. That afternoon, waiting for her at a train stop with Sekai, Makoto thanks her for helping him, offering whatever he can in return. As a train pulls in, Sekai turns to kiss him on the lips, skipping into an open passenger car and bidding the dumbstruck boy luck with his new girlfriend.
2	"The Distance Between The Two"; Transliteration: "Futari no Kyori" (Japanese: 二人の距離)	Tōru Kitahata	Chabō Higurashi	July 10, 2007
Makoto takes Kotonoha on an awkward first date through town, an outing that ends uncomfortably when he tries to kiss her. Sekai gets word of this and coaches Makoto about his behavior in school the next day, setting him up with movie tickets for a date with Kotonoha. Things worsen in the theater the following afternoon however, something Sekai insists is a result of him moving too fast. She persuades Makoto to apologize to Kotonoha, and catching her before a council meeting, arranges to see her after school at the train stop. Kotonoha deliberately tries to avoid going and is coached by Sekai as well, as the two sit at a playground and discuss the state of the relationship. Convinced of Makoto's good-intentions, Kotonoha meets him at the train stop, planting a kiss on his lips.
3	"Missing Each Other"; Transliteration: "Surechigau Omoi" (Japanese: 擦れ違う想い)	Masakazu Amiya	Hiro Akizuki	July 17, 2007
During lunch break the next day, Kotonoha tells Makoto that her little sister, Kokoro, would like to meet him sometime, an invitation he gladly accepts. On the train ride home together that evening, Kotonoha appears troubled, rushing out at her stop even after Makoto comforts her. She takes the bus over the train to school the following morning and remains quiet up until lunch, where she meets Makoto on the roof and invites him to visit Sunday. The two of them spend a fun time with Kokoro and it is only afterward that Kotonoha reveals what has been bothering her: she would like for them to address each other by their first names. Makoto agrees, and after sharing a quick laugh, leaves for home. That night, back at his apartment, Makoto calls Sekai about the date, telling her that being around Kotonoha is boring.
4	"Innocence"; Transliteration: "Muku" (Japanese: 無垢)	Kazunobu Shimizu	Yutaka Nada	July 24, 2007
Sekai approaches Makoto at school about his comment from the previous night, though he is unable to word himself to her. That afternoon, Makoto and Kotonoha make out in secret on the roof, an activity that is cut short when he gropes her chest. She calls Sekai that night to discuss what happened and is assured that Makoto is, once again, moving too fast. The following morning, pulling him out of class, Sekai gets the truth out of Makoto: he would like the relationship to become sexual. She offers to teach him about intimacy and mood, bringing Makoto to a park, karaoke, and scandalously, to the roof of the school where she allows him to fondle and strip her. Leaving for home, Makoto bumps into Kotonoha who invites him to visit a newly opened water park with her.
5	"Ripple"; Transliteration: "Hamon" (Japanese: 波紋)	Tarō Kubo	Chabō Higurashi; Makoto Uezu	July 31, 2007
Makoto and Kotonoha are accompanied to the water park by Sekai and friends Setsuna, Hikari and Taisuke the following day, where everyone but Makoto seem to have an enjoyable time. In spite of Kotonoha's noticeably more affectionate behavior towards him, Makoto's mood about her and the relationship does not improve. Sekai notices this, and pulling him aside on their way out of the park, firmly reminds him that both of them are no more than friends. Makoto ponders her words carefully as evening draws in and the group return home, and unable to accept things how they are, rushes back to see her. Sekai returns to the station to meet him, plagued with a mixed conscience, but ultimately reciprocates. Later that night, having returned to her apartment, the two have sex.
6	"Relationships Revealing"; Transliteration: "Akasareta Kankei" (Japanese: 明かされた関係)	Takao Yotsuji	Hiro Akizuki	August 7, 2007
In the days following their night together, Makoto and Sekai begin regularly seeing each other. It isn't long before she begins to feel remorse and urges Makoto to reveal their affair to Kotonoha, especially when he begins to dissociate from and lie to her. That evening, returning home on a train, Kotonoha catches sight of Sekai and Makoto kissing, a sight she believes was mistaken. With school festival preparations underway, Kotonoha texts Makoto a couple days later at school that a committee meeting will conflict with their usual lunch break, a chance he promptly uses to be with Sekai. Kotonoha is unexpectedly let out early however, and rushes excitedly to meet Makoto on the roof. As her hand graces the doorknob of the entrance though, the sound of Sekai's confession stops her in her tracks.
7	"Eve"; Transliteration: "Zen'yasai" (Japanese: 前夜祭)	Makoto Sokuza	Hiro Akizuki	August 14, 2007
Makoto's class begins to prepare for the upcoming festival, during which time Setsuna, convinced he is now dating Sekai, tells the group that he and Kotonoha split. She continues throughout the week keeping Kotonoha away from Makoto, even adding her number to his phone's blocked list, an effort he begins to question. Sekai gets word of this change of heart, suspecting that Makoto is falling back in love with Kotonoha, a situation that worsens when Kotonoha pays an unexpected visit to his apartment that night. He unblocks her number, and despite her showing clear signs of denial, makes an empty promise to dance with her at the festival. Overcome with emotion, Sekai excuses herself from his apartment, happening upon Kotonoha who gives her a resounding slap to the face.
8	"School Festival"; Transliteration: "Gakusai" (Japanese: 学祭)	Shunji Yoshida	Yutaka Nada	August 21, 2007
Sekai is absent from class the following morning; after keeping Makoto from walking home with Kotonoha, Setsuna convinces him to visit her. Despite Sekai's concerns about the effects of their relationship, Makoto maintains that he prefers her over Kotonoha. The day of the festival arrives, and everything is in full swing. An effort to pull customers to the group's cafe leaves their hallway in disrepair however, leaving Makoto and Setsuna to fetch supplies. It is during this time that she makes a revelation to him: she will be moving to France soon. She thinks back to when she first met Makoto, how he comforted her when she was picked on, and encouraged to join the student council. Back at school and enveloped with feeling, Setsuna leans down and kisses a sleeping Makoto on the lips to the shock of Kotonoha.
9	"Last day of the School Festival"; Transliteration: "Kōyasai" (Japanese: 後夜祭)	Masakazu Amiya	Yutaka Nada; Makoto Uezu	August 28, 2007
Kotonoha talks to Setsuna about the kiss, and the effects it would have on Sekai if she found out. The festival continues the next day, with Makoto, Sekai, and Hikari making baked goods for their classroom cafe. Taisuke goes to fetch more supplies and finds Kotonoha, who he suggests is no longer Makoto's girlfriend, something she firmly denies. Makoto goes on break and is approached by Otome Kato, a friend of his from middle school, who he tours the festival with. Sekai breaks them up, and after seeing that he's missed twenty texts from Kotonoha, rushes to see her. Otome catches and drags him to a secret lounge instead, where the two have sex. That night, while Makoto dances with Sekai around the festival bonfire, Taisuke rapes Kotonoha while she is still in shock from seeing Makoto dancing with Sekai.
10	"Mind and Body"; Transliteration: "Kokoro to Karada" (Japanese: 心と体)	Tetsuya Watanabe	Hiro Akizuki; Makoto Uezu	September 4, 2007
Kotonoha breaks down crying when she sees Makoto and Sekai dance at the end of episode 9. The next morning the school begins cleaning up. Setsuna is unconvinced that he has split with Kotonoha, leading him to tell Kotonoha that he does not like her anymore when she encounters them. By evening Makoto has gone missing; Setsuna finds him in gym storage having sex with Otome again. Setsuna visits his apartment that night demanding that he break ties with everyone but Sekai, offering to have sex with him in return. The following afternoon, the girls' basketball team hosts a video screening, where footage of couples having sex in the secret lounge is played. Sekai is shocked to find that Makoto was there with Otome and angrily tries to call him. She bumps into Kotonoha, who alludes that Setsuna is with him.
11	"Everyone's Makoto"; Transliteration: "Minna no Makoto" (Japanese: みんなの誠)	Kazunobu Shimizu	Hiro Akizuki; Makoto Uezu	September 11, 2007
Sekai begins missing school, devastated that Setsuna has left and that Makoto was unfaithful. It is revealed that night that Hikari has also begun sleeping with him. The following night, after falling nauseous and throwing up, Sekai concludes that she is pregnant, visiting Makoto at school the next day and proclaiming it in class. The news spreads quickly; in response, all of Makoto's contacts begin cutting him off. Sekai visits his apartment to cook, brightening to the fact that she is carrying his child. He goes out for a walk looking for a partner and is happened upon by Kotonoha, who he finds is thoroughly, unmistakably broken. Her empty condition is too much for him to bear, and in a fit of emotion, he breaks down, embracing her in tears and apologizing. Life returns to her eyes, and with a smile, she hugs him back.
12	"School Days"; Transliteration: "Sukūru Deizu" (Japanese: スクールデイズ)	Keitarō Motonaga	Hiro Akizuki; Makoto Uezu	September 27, 2007
Makoto takes Kotonoha out for dinner, receiving a call from Sekai who demands to know his whereabouts. He angrily blames her for ruining his life and asks for her to leave his apartment, which she promptly does. On her way home however, she catches sight of Makoto and Kotonoha on a train together, and returns. In the heat of fighting, Makoto and Kotonoha make out in front of Sekai, who screams and leaves. Things are worsened later that night, when she receives a text from him insisting she get an abortion. The following day, arranging to talk at his apartment, Sekai brutally stabs Makoto to death with a kitchen knife and flees. She receives a text from his phone that night requesting her presence on the school roof, where she meets Kotonoha. After presenting her with Makoto's severed head, she slits open Sekai's neck with a dōzuki, causing her to collapse and die in a fountain of blood. With her former friend out of commission, Kotonoha carves into Sekai's uterus, but sees no fetus in there according to Kotonoha's soliloquy. Early that morning, floating into a sunrise on a sailboat, Kotonoha is seen cuddling Makoto's severed head whispering that they can finally be together.

== OVAs ==
No.	Title	Directed by	Written by	Original release date
1	"Valentine Days"; Transliteration: "Barentain Deizu" (Japanese: バレンタインデイズ)	Keitarō Motonaga	Hiro Akizuki; Makoto Uezu	17 January 2008
Kotonoha and Kokoro invite Sekai, Setsuna, Hikari, Otome and Nanami to an onsen to relax. The following afternoon, the girls discuss Valentine's Day and giri chocos, something Sekai and Kotonoha make that night. The holiday passes uninterrupted for Makoto who, that evening, is dragged outside by Otome. Followed shortly by Sekai and Kotonoha, their arguing over whose chocolate to accept scares him off, and in the later company of Sekai's mom Youko and Kokoro, the girls give chase. Cornered on the roof of the school, the girls shove all of the chocolates into his mouth which, inexplicably, explode. Crawling back to class, Makoto is mortified to find that chocolates given to him by Setsuna are in fact, from Taisuke, who effeminately reveals himself out from behind a desk wearing lipstick.
2	"Magical Heart Kokoro"; Transliteration: "Majikaru Hāto Kokoro-chan" (Japanese: マジカルハート☆こころちゃん)	Keitarō Motonaga	Makoto Uezu	6 March 2008
On a train ride to school, Makoto watches a flying saucer get shot down at the presumed hands of a little girl in costume. The following afternoon, Kotonoha visits Radish, a restaurant where Kokoro is waitressing with Sekai, Hikari and Nanami. The four of them receive an obscure phone call and excuse themselves into a secret underground facility, where they are told that a mysterious gas is turning men into lecherous zombies. After transforming into the Radish Mobile Squad, a group reminiscent of Super Sentai, the girls confront Doctor S, a supervillain portrayed by Setsuna, and her assistant Tanaka, a schoolboy whose face is never seen. Their effort to vacuum the gas out of the city backfires, leaving everyone but Kokoro, who has gone missing, in peril. Out of nowhere, a little girl casts a large spell over the zombies, returning them to normal people, and proclaims herself as Magical Heart. Doctor S inflates Tanaka to a gargantuan size, who proceeds to wreak havoc on the surrounding city. Unable to defeat the large foe and swatted from the air, Makoto catches Magical Heart and is then rescued by Magical Word, another superhero portrayed by Kotonoha. The two heroines fuse their powers together, creating and piloting a similarly large mech of 0verflow's mascot, which after pushing Tanaka to the ground, summons a large chainsaw and cuts him down the middle. Doctor S retreats and things return to normal. The next day everyone meets up at Radish to talk, where Makoto draws a similarity between Kokoro and Magical Heart.
