= David Yazbek =

American composer (born 1961)

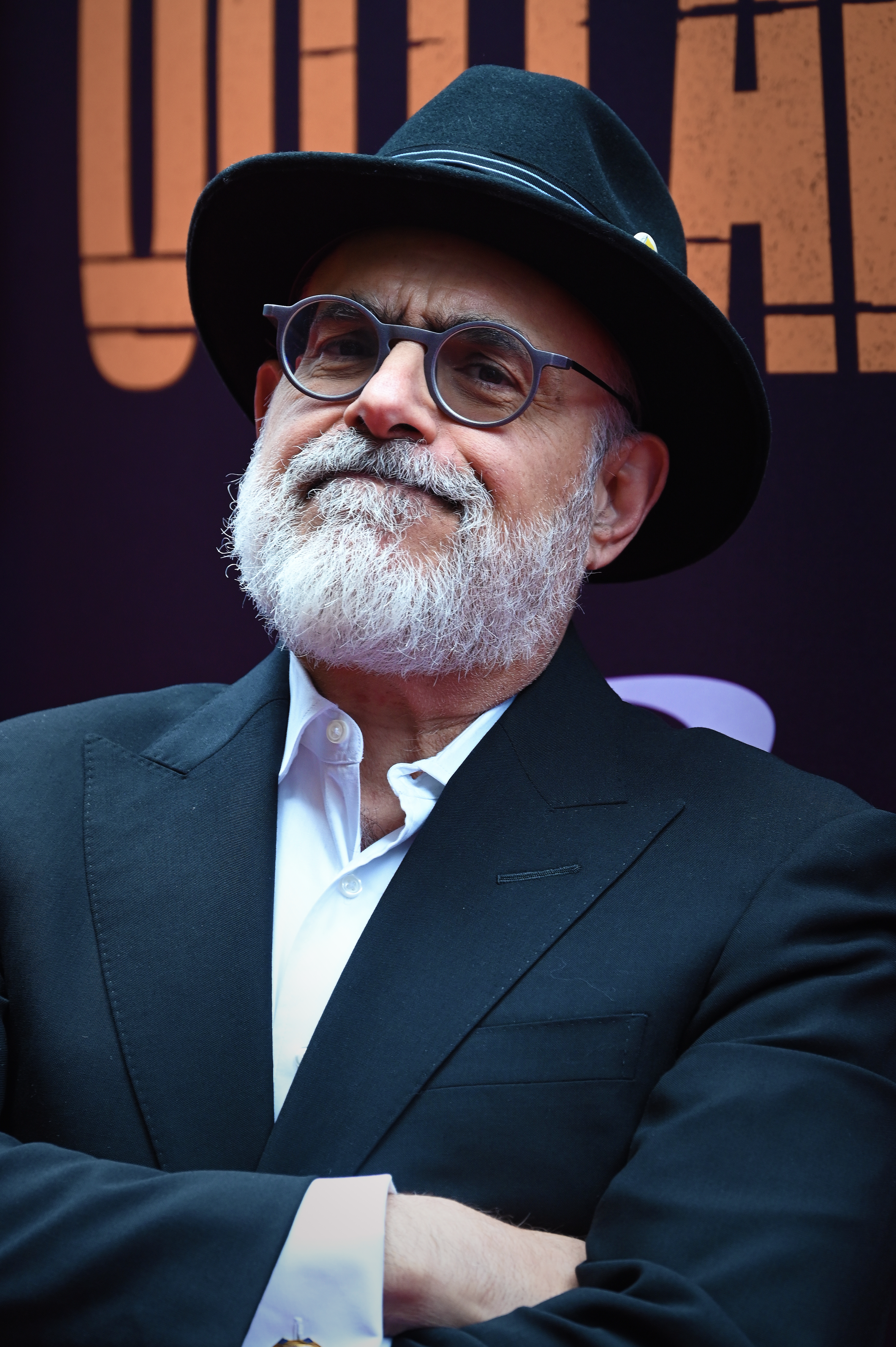
- Yazbek in 2025

Background information
- Born: 1961 (age 64–65); New York City, U.S.
- Genres: Musical theatre
- Occupations: Writer, musician, composer, lyricist
- Years active: 1987–present
- Website: davidyazbek.com

David Norman Yazbek (born 1961) is an American writer, musician, composer, and lyricist. He wrote the music and lyrics for the Broadway musicals The Full Monty (2000), Dirty Rotten Scoundrels (2004), Women on the Verge of a Nervous Breakdown (2010), The Band's Visit (2017), Tootsie (2019), and Dead Outlaw (2025). He won a Tony Award and a Grammy Award for The Band's Visit. He also consulted on the musical Buena Vista Social Club, for which he won another Grammy Award for Best Musical Theater Album.

== Early life ==
David Yazbek was born in New York City. His father is of Lebanese descent, and his mother was of half-Italian and half-Jewish ancestry. He began cello lessons in elementary school and took up the piano as a teenager. He attended Riverdale Country School.

While attending Brown University as an undergraduate, he wrote an original musical with the production group Brownbrokers before graduating in 1982. He also directed a production of Hair with the student theatre group Production Workshop, for which he composed an original song to complement the classic score.

== Career ==
After college Yazbek got a job writing for David Letterman's late-night television show Late Night with David Letterman. He won a Primetime Emmy Award for Outstanding Writing for a Variety Series at the 36th Primetime Emmy Awards as part of Letterman's writing team in 1984, but quit to pursue his love of music. From 1987 to 1989 he was the co-owner of Manhattan Recording Company and wrote many commercial jingles.

Yazbek co-wrote the title theme song to the 1991 Emmy Award winning PBS TV series Where in the World Is Carmen Sandiego? with songwriter Sean Altman, a high school friend who led the show's featured vocal group, Rockapella. Yazbek and Altman also composed and wrote the theme song to World's `1996 successor, Where in Time Is Carmen Sandiego? He has written many other songs and background scores for children's television shows, especially those produced for the Disney Channel.

In 2000, director Jack O'Brien approached composer-lyricist Adam Guettel to write the music and lyrics for a musical based on the hit movie The Full Monty. Guettel declined, but recommended Yazbek, whom he had played with in a band. Yazbek took the job, collaborating with librettist Terrence McNally. The show was a success, although it was overshadowed that year by Mel Brooks' musical The Producers. The Full Monty ran for two years before closing, and for his work Yazbek was nominated for the Tony Award for Best Original Score at the 55th Tony Awards and the Drama Desk Award for Outstanding Lyrics, and won the Drama Desk Award for Outstanding Music. In 2002 he was a contributing lyricist for the musical Bombay Dreams.

Yazbek wrote the music and lyrics to the musical adaptation of Dirty Rotten Scoundrels, which opened on Broadway in 2005, featuring John Lithgow, Norbert Leo Butz, Sherie Rene Scott, Joanna Gleason, and Gregory Jbara. Yazbek was again nominated for the Tony Award for Best Original Score at the 59th Tony Awards, and Drama Desk Awards for Outstanding Music and Outstanding Lyrics.

Yazbek wrote the music for the musical adaptation of the 1988 Pedro Almodóvar film Women on the Verge of a Nervous Breakdown. In October 2009, the musical had a closed reading directed by Bartlett Sher and featuring Salma Hayek, Jessica Biel, Matthew Morrison, and Paulo Szot. The musical opened on Broadway at the Belasco Theatre on November 4, 2010, with previews starting October 8. The musical starred Patti LuPone, Brian Stokes Mitchell, and Sherie Rene Scott, with direction by Bartlett Sher. The production received mixed to negative reviews, despite praise for the actors and Yazbek's score, and closed on January 2, 2011, after 30 previews and 69 performances. Despite the early closing, the show was nominated for three Tony Awards, for the performances of Patti LuPone and Laura Benanti, and Yazbek's score, at the 65th Tony Awards.

Yazbek wrote the music and lyrics for the musical adaptation of the film The Band's Visit, with a book by Itamar Moses. The musical premiered Off-Broadway at the Atlantic Theatre Company Linda Gross Theater on November 11, 2016, in previews. The cast featured John Cariani and Tony Shalhoub with direction by David Cromer. This production won him the 2017 Obie Award for Musical Theatre and later the production transferred to the Ethel Barrymore Theatre on Broadway. Yazbek won the Tony Award for Best Original Score for his efforts on this show at the 72nd Tony Awards.

Yazbek wrote the music and lyrics for the musical adaptation of the 1982 film Tootsie, with a book by Robert Horn. It opened in Chicago at the Cadillac Palace Theatre in September 2018 and opened on Broadway in March 2019. The show was nominated for eleven Tony Awards, including for Yazbek's score, at the 73rd Tony Awards. The show won two awards: Best Book of a Musical and Best Performance by an Actor in a Leading Role in a Musical (Santino Fontana).

In 2022, Yazbek reunited with Itamar Moses for the book and collaborated with Erik Della Penna for the music and lyrics of the musical Dead Outlaw, based on a true story, which had a premiere presentation at Feinstein's/54 Below. Dead Outlaw opened off-Broadway in March 2024 and on Broadway in April 2025.

Yazbek has released five rock albums to date. He has produced tracks for the band XTC, and its lead singer Andy Partridge has collaborated on Yazbek's solo albums. He also has written for or produced recordings by Spacehog, Tito Puente, The Persuasions, and Queen Sarah Saturday. XTC also contributed a track, "Cherry in Your Tree" to the 1994 Carmen Sandiego soundtrack album Carmen Sandiego: Out of This World, which Yazbek produced.

=== Unrealized projects ===
In 2007, Yazbek began developing the music and lyrics for Bruce Lee: Journey to the West, a stage musical based on the life of martial artist Bruce Lee. Bruce Lee would feature a book by David Henry Hwang and be directed by Bartlett Sher. Variety reported that the musical was aiming to open at the Rialto Square Theatre during the 2010–2011 season, but these plans have been put on indefinite hold.

On June 12, 2013, it was announced that Yazbek would be replacing the Barenaked Ladies to write the score to the musical adaptation of National Lampoon's Animal House, with a book by Michael Mitnick.

== Discography ==
=== As solo artist ===
| Year | Title | Label |
|---|---|---|
| 1995 | The Laughing Man | Midi Inc. (Japan); What Are Records? (USA); Humbug (Germany) |
| 1998 | Tock | What Are Records? |
| 2001 | Damascus | What Are Records? |
| 2005 | Tape Recorder: Collected Works | What Are Records? |
| 2007 | Evil Monkey Man | Ghostlight Records |

=== As musical composer ===
| Year | Title | Label |
|---|---|---|
| 2000 | The Full Monty | Masterworks Broadway |
| 2005 | Dirty Rotten Scoundrels | Ghostlight Records |
| 2011 | Women on the Verge of a Nervous Breakdown | Ghostlight Records |
| 2017 | The Band's Visit | Ghostlight Records |
| 2019 | Tootsie | Decca Broadway |
| 2025 | Dead Outlaw | Yellow Sound Label |

=== Other contributions ===
| Year | Title | Role | Label |
|---|---|---|---|
| 1992 | Where in the World Is Carmen Sandiego? | Producer; Songwriter | Fight Records; Zoom Express; BMG Kidz |
| 1993 | Carmen Sandiego: Out of This World | Executive producer; Producer; Songwriter | Fight Records; Zoom Express; BMG Kidz |
| 1995 | A Testimonial Dinner: The Songs of XTC | Executive producer | Thirsty Ear Recordings |
| 1998 | Songs From Jim Henson's Bear in the Big Blue House | Songwriter | Walt Disney Records |

== Awards and nominations ==
| Year | Association | Category | Nominated work | Result |
|---|---|---|---|---|
| 1984 | Primetime Emmy Award | Outstanding Writing in a Variety or Music Program | Late Night with David Letterman | Won |
| 2001 | Tony Award | Best Original Score | The Full Monty | Nominated |
| 2001 | Drama Desk Award | Outstanding Music | The Full Monty | Won |
| 2001 | Drama Desk Award | Outstanding Lyrics | The Full Monty | Nominated |
| 2002 | Grammy Award | Best Musical Show Album | The Full Monty | Nominated |
| 2005 | Tony Award | Best Original Score | Dirty Rotten Scoundrels | Nominated |
| 2005 | Drama Desk Award | Outstanding Music | Dirty Rotten Scoundrels | Nominated |
| 2005 | Drama Desk Award | Outstanding Lyrics | Dirty Rotten Scoundrels | Nominated |
| 2006 | Grammy Award | Best Musical Show Album | Dirty Rotten Scoundrels | Nominated |
| 2011 | Tony Award | Best Original Score | Women on the Verge of a Nervous Breakdown | Nominated |
| 2011 | Drama Desk Award | Outstanding Music | Women on the Verge of a Nervous Breakdown | Nominated |
| 2011 | Drama Desk Award | Outstanding Orchestrations | Women on the Verge of a Nervous Breakdown | Nominated |
| 2011 | Outer Critics Circle Award | Outstanding New Score (Broadway or Off-Broadway) | Women on the Verge of a Nervous Breakdown | Nominated |
| 2017 | Drama Desk Award | Outstanding Music | The Band's Visit | Won |
| 2017 | Drama Desk Award | Outstanding Lyrics | The Band's Visit | Won |
| 2017 | Lucille Lortel Award | Outstanding Musical | The Band's Visit | Won |
| 2017 | Outer Critics Circle Award | Outstanding New Score (Broadway or Off-Broadway) | The Band's Visit | Won |
| 2018 | Tony Award | Best Original Score | The Band's Visit | Won |
| 2019 | Grammy Award | Best Musical Theater Album | The Band's Visit | Won |
| 2019 | Tony Award | Best Original Score | Tootsie | Nominated |
| 2019 | Drama Desk Award | Outstanding Music | Tootsie | Won |
| 2019 | Drama Desk Award | Outstanding Lyrics | Tootsie | Won |
| 2019 | Outer Critics Circle Award | Outstanding New Score (Broadway or Off-Broadway) | Tootsie | Nominated |
| 2024 | Lucille Lortel Award | Outstanding Musical | Dead Outlaw | Nominated |
| 2024 | Drama Desk Award | Outstanding Music | Dead Outlaw | Nominated |
| 2024 | Drama Desk Award | Outstanding Lyrics | Dead Outlaw | Won |
| 2024 | Drama Desk Award | Outstanding Orchestrations | Dead Outlaw | Nominated |
| 2024 | Outer Critics Circle Award | Outstanding Score (Broadway or Off-Broadway) | Dead Outlaw | Nominated |
| 2024 | Outer Critics Circle Award | Outstanding Orchestrations (Broadway or Off-Broadway) | Dead Outlaw | Nominated |
| 2025 | Tony Award | Best Original Score | Dead Outlaw | Nominated |
| 2025 | Tony Award | Best Musical | Buena Vista Social Club | Nominated |
| 2026 | Grammy Award | Best Musical Theater Album | Buena Vista Social Club | Won |
