= Where in the World Is Carmen Sandiego? (game show) =

American children's television game show

- Based on: Where in the World Is Carmen Sandiego? published by Broderbund
- Developed by: Howard Blumenthal; Dana Calderwood; Dorothy Curley
- Directed by: Dana Calderwood (1991–1993); Hugh Martin (1994–1995)
- Presented by: Greg Lee
- Starring: Lynne Thigpen; Rockapella
- Voices of: Barry Carl; Chris Phillips; Doug Preis; Christine Sokol
- Theme music composer: Sean Altman; David Yazbek
- Opening theme: "Where in the World Is Carmen Sandiego?" by Rockapella
- Composers: Scott Leonard; Elliott Kerman; Barry Carl; Sean Altman; Jeff Thacher
- Country of origin: United States
- Original language: English
- No. of seasons: 5
- No. of episodes: 295

Production
- Executive producers: Jay Rayvid; Kate Taylor
- Producers: Howard Blumenthal; Jonathan Meath; Ariel Schwartz
- Production locations: Chelsea Studios; Manhattan, New York (1991–1992); Kaufman Astoria Studios; Queens, New York (1992–1995)
- Running time: 26–28 minutes
- Production companies: WQED Pittsburgh; WGBH Boston

Original release
- Network: PBS
- Release: September 30, 1991 – December 22, 1995

Related
- Where in Time Is Carmen Sandiego? Where on Earth Is Carmen Sandiego? Carmen Sandiego (Netflix series)

Where in the World Is Carmen Sandiego? is an American children's television game show based on the Carmen Sandiego computer game series created by Broderbund. The show was hosted by Greg Lee, who was joined by Lynne Thigpen and the a cappella vocal group Rockapella, who served as the show's house band and comedy troupe. The series was videotaped in New York City at Chelsea Studios and Kaufman Astoria Studios (the latter of which also housed the set of Sesame Street) and co-produced by WQED and WGBH-TV, and aired on PBS stations from September 30, 1991, to December 22, 1995, with reruns continuing to air until May 31, 1996. A total of 295 episodes over five seasons were recorded (65 each in Seasons 1 through 3, and 50 each in Seasons 4 and 5).

The show was created partially in response to the results of a National Geographic survey indicating little knowledge of geography among some of the American populace, with one in four being unable to locate the Soviet Union or the Pacific Ocean. The show's questions were verified by National Geographic World, who also provided prizes to the contestants in the form of subscriptions to their magazine.

The show garnered critical acclaim for its unique approach that blended geography and other subjects in game show and its faithfulness of the source material, consider it to be a "forgotten masterpiece" of an adaptation of video game. It also received numerous accolades including seven Daytime Emmys and a 1992 Peabody Award. In 2001, TV Guide ranked the show at No. 47 on its list of 50 Greatest Game Shows of All Time.

== Gameplay ==
On each episode, three contestants (10–14 years of age) answered geography-related trivia questions to determine the location of one of Carmen Sandiego's cronies and eventually Carmen herself. The contestants assumed the role of newly hired investigators at ACME Crimenet, a private detective agency, and were referred to as "gumshoes," while Lee's title was "Special Agent in Charge of Training New Recruits" (seasons 1 and 2, upgraded to "Senior Agent" beginning in season 3).

=== Round One ===
The Chief briefed Lee and the gumshoes on a recent crime (the theft of a world landmark or something closely associated with a particular city/country) and its perpetrator. Each gumshoe began the game with 50 ACME Crime Bucks and attempted to earn more by answering questions that served as clues to the crook's whereabouts. For each question, they were shown three possible locations on a map and secretly chose one each; a correct answer awarded 10 Crime Bucks, with no penalty for a miss.

Various elements of this round included:

- Phone Tap / World Band Radio: Gumshoes heard more clues to the crook's location in the form of either a phone call between Carmen and the crook, or a snippet of a foreign radio broadcast.
- Word on the Street: Lee stepped outside the office to find the members of Rockapella talking about a foreign word chalked on the pavement and offering clues associated with it.
- Training Exercise (season 5 only): Each gumshoe was given a trash can that held a card marked with the flag of a particular country and a one-word prompt, and had to dig it out and put the lid back on the can as quickly as possible. Lee then read three clues based on the prompts, and the gumshoes answered in the order that they had completed the exercise. The first one to choose the correct country earned 10 Crime Bucks.
- Lightning Round: Three multiple-choice questions were asked, all relating to the crook's last known location. The gumshoes had to buzz in to respond, and a correct answer awarded five Crime Bucks.
- Chief's Office: After the Lightning Round, the Chief called Lee into her office for a brief conference. This was used as a comedy break, during which the Chief and Lee engaged in a brief skit, usually brought to a close by either announcing the show's grand prize of a trip to anywhere in the continental United States (seasons 1 and 2) or in North America (starting in season 3), or by announcing the details or winners of a home viewer contest (also starting in season 3). This segment ended with the Chief's brusque dismissal of Lee: "Go away!"
- The Chase (beginning in season 2): Five toss-up questions were asked, serving as clues to locations that indicated a path the crook was following. As in the Lightning Round, gumshoes buzzed in to respond and earned five Crime Bucks per correct answer. This segment was introduced with a brief chase skit performed by Rockapella comically running across the stage, sometimes accompanied by others, including Lee, the Chief, some stagehands, and even members of the studio audience.

The round ended with the Final Clue, in which the gumshoes were shown a map of three locations and secretly decided how much of their scores they wanted to wager (0 to 50 Crime Bucks, in increments of 10). The clues were then presented and the gumshoes chose their answers; a correct guess added the gumshoe's wager to their score, while a miss deducted it. The lowest scorer after the Final Clue was eliminated from the game and received a consolation prize.

If the round ended in a tie for second place, Lee read clues to the identity of a famous person or place (the latter often a US state). Gumshoes could buzz in as soon and as often as they wanted; the first to give the correct answer scored five Crime Bucks and advanced. In the event of a three-way tie, two such tiebreakers were played and the winners advanced.

=== Round Two: Jail Time Challenge ===
Following a briefing by the Chief on the Final Clue location, the two remaining gumshoes were shown a board of 15 trilons, each displaying the name of a different landmark within one of its cities. Hidden behind three of the trilons were the day's stolen loot, an arrest warrant, and the crook him/herself; the other 12 revealed only shoe prints when chosen, indicating that nothing was there.

The higher-scoring gumshoe (or the winner of a coin toss, in case of a tie) had first choice from the board. The gumshoes then alternated turns until one of them found all three of the key items in the required order:

- First, the loot, the evidence required for the warrant.
- Second, the warrant to arrest the crook.
- Third, the crook him/herself.

Finding any item awarded an extra turn, but if a gumshoe found an item out of order (e.g. finding the warrant first), Lee would remind them of the proper sequence. A turn ended when a gumshoe either failed to find an item, or uncovered all three in an incorrect order.

The first gumshoe to find all three items in order won the game and advanced to the bonus round, pulling a ring on a chain rope to arrest the crook. The losing gumshoe received a consolation prize. If a gumshoe won the game on their first turn, without any items being previously uncovered, a $100 savings bond was hidden behind one of the other 12 spaces and they were given five chances to find and win it.

=== Bonus Round: Carmen's World Map ===
The winning gumshoe secretly wrote down a destination they wanted to visit if they won the grand prize, then received a phone call from the apprehended crook informing them of Carmen's whereabouts: a certain continent (Asia, Africa, Europe, South America) or the United States (expanded to all of North America in season 3). The Chief read a list of 13 possible locations, each of which would be highlighted on a computer-drawn map for the home viewers' benefit.

Lee and the gumshoe then moved to a giant unlabeled map that covered the entire floor in front of the studio audience. The map showed small red circles denoting particular cities, and later added further markings for bodies of water or national monuments.

To capture Carmen, the gumshoe had to identify seven different locations on the map (eight beginning in season 2) within 45 seconds. As Lee read out each location, the gumshoe had to pick up a pole-mounted strobe light and place it on that spot. The light activated and a brief siren sounded to indicate a correct guess, while a buzzer sounded on a miss and the gumshoe was given a second chance. If the gumshoe missed again, they had to leave the light where it was and go on to the next location.

Completing the round won the trip to the chosen destination and a promotion to the rank of Sleuth, while failing to do so won a consolation prize.

== Characters ==
Season 5 cast (L-R): Greg Lee, Elliott Kerman, Lynne Thigpen, Barry Carl, Jeff Thacher, Scott Leonard, and (at bottom, seated) Sean Altman

=== The Chief ===
The Chief (Lynne Thigpen) is head of the fictional "ACME Crimenet". As the de facto announcer for the show, the Chief eloquently uses dialogue with wordplay. During season 1, she introduced the gumshoes at the beginning of each episode.

Thigpen's portrayal of the Chief became so popular that she reprised the role in later editions of the PC games, and also in the subsequent TV series Where in Time Is Carmen Sandiego?

=== Rockapella ===
New York City a cappella group Rockapella was the house band for the show and also contributed to the comic relief. During the series run, their lineup included:

- Scott Leonard (high tenor)
- Sean Altman (tenor)
- Elliott Kerman (baritone)
- Barry Carl (bass)
- Jeff Thacher (vocal percussion; season 5 only)

The group performed the theme music and also brief musical interludes and introductions. They also performed the "think music" during the wager period of the first round and the section where the winner writes where they want to go if they capture Carmen. They also provided brief humorous musical sound effects during the Jail Time Challenge round of the game, as well as background music during the 45-second bonus round.

Carl introduced each episode's gumshoes beginning with season 2; for season 5, he and Altman alternated this duty.

=== V.I.L.E. ===
V.I.L.E. is Carmen's gang of crooks and the rogues' gallery of ne'er-do-wells comprises the following:

- Carmen Sandiego: Master thief, criminal mastermind and the leader of V.I.L.E. During the show's "Phone Tap" segments, she was heard talking to the episode's crook, giving them advice to evade detection. The ultimate goal of the game is to capture Carmen after the crook was caught.
- Vic the Slick: A tactless salesman who wears a loud polyester suit. He also has a seedy moustache, shifty eyes and slicked black hair.
- The Contessa (Appearing in seasons 1, 4 & 5): A so-called criminal of style who fancies herself to be near-royalty.
- Top Grunge: A burly and unkempt biker who was always riding his chopper motorcycle. Dirty and surrounded by flies, he continually sneezed, snorted, and coughed during conversations.
- Eartha Brute: A muscular, dimwitted woman.
- RoboCrook (Unit-059): A cyborg spoof of RoboCop. He is Carmen's Right-handed man.
- Patty Larceny: A flighty, blonde schoolgirl with a sweet and giggly personality. Her name is a pun on the phrase "petty larceny".
- Double Trouble: A pair of Yin and Yang party-boy twins with quarter moon-shaped heads. They speak in a voice similar to Jack Nicholson.
- Kneemoi: A shape-shifting alien from the planet Roddenberry who is introduced in season 2. Her name is a reference to Leonard Nimoy best known for playing Spock of Star Trek and her home planet to the franchise's creator Gene Roddenberry.
- Wonder Rat: A superhero parody in a makeshift rat costume who is introduced in season 2. He also possesses his own helicopter.
- Sarah Nade: A loud, obnoxious teenage punk rocker with rainbow-colored hair who is introduced in season 3. Her name is a pun on the word "serenade".

== Production ==
A staff of 150 worked to produce the show. Each season was produced in six weeks. Typically three to four episodes were taped each shooting day in a New York studio. Producers contacted local New York schools and considered children aged 8–13; entrants were required to take a geography test. Prospective contestants who passed the test were then interviewed by producers.

=== Original music and theme song ===
"Where in the World Is Carmen Sandiego?"

Song by Rockapella
- Released: 1992
- Genre: A Cappella
- Length: 2:48 (Where in the World Is Carmen Sandiego?); 2:59 (Primer); 4:13 (In Concert); 5:44 (Live in Japan)
- Label: Shakariki Records; Amerigo Records; J-Bird Records
- Composers: Sean Altman; David Yazbek

All of the music on the series (including assorted short stings and stagers) was arranged and performed by Rockapella. The theme song played in full over the animated end credits as the studio audience danced to the music on the map, and in later episodes the audience joined in singing along. The main theme song was written by Rockapella co-founder Sean Altman and David Yazbek, and appears on the 1992 soundtrack album Where in the World Is Carmen Sandiego? and also in the compilation Television's Greatest Hits Volume 7: Cable Ready (TVT 1996).

=== Animation ===
Graphic designer Gene Mackles recalled: "I took on the assignment to produce about 2 hours of animation for the [show]. With a ridiculously tight deadline and budget, the only possibility for this to work at the time involved purchasing half a dozen Macintosh computers and assembling a team of animators using Macromind Director to get it to happen. Amazingly enough it worked, and Chris Pullman and I won a daytime Emmy for our effort". All the animated characters were created on the Mac.

=== Geopolitical changes ===
Following the completion of taping for the first season, massive geopolitical changes in the world—including the dissolution of the Soviet Union and the breakup of Yugoslavia—rendered the entire season geographically inaccurate. Starting in the second season, a disclaimer aired in the closing stating "All geographic information was accurate as of the date this program was recorded."

== Critical reception ==
NerdHQ deemed the series the "crown jewel" of the Carmen Sandiego franchise.

=== Awards and nominations ===
Aside from the aforementioned Emmy and Peabody wins, the show was nominated for several other awards.

Year	Award	Title	Recipient	Result
1992	Young Artist Award	Outstanding New Animation Series	Where in the World Is Carmen Sandiego?	Nominated
1992	Daytime Emmy	Outstanding Achievement in Art Direction/Set Decoration/Scenic Design	Jim Fenhagen	Won
1992	Daytime Emmy	Outstanding Children's Series	Jay Rayvid (executive producer) et al.	Nominated
1992	Peabody Award	Recipient, 53rd Annual Peabody Awards	Where in the World Is Carmen Sandiego?	Won
1993	Daytime Emmy	Outstanding Achievement in Art Direction/Set Decoration/Scenic Design	Jim Fenhagen (set designer) & Laura Brock (art director)	Won
1993	Daytime Emmy	Outstanding Directing in a Children's Series	Dana Calderwood	Nominated
1993	Daytime Emmy	Outstanding Achievement in Graphics and Title Design	Gene Mackles & Chris Pullman	Nominated
1993	Daytime Emmy	Outstanding Children's Series	Jay Rayvid (executive producer) et al.	Nominated
1994	Daytime Emmy	Outstanding Performer in a Children's Series	Lynne Thigpen for playing "The Chief"	Nominated
1994	Daytime Emmy	Outstanding Achievement in Art Direction/Set Decoration/Scenic Design	Jim Fenhagen (scenic designer) & Laura Brock (art director)	Nominated
1994	Daytime Emmy	Outstanding Children's Series	Jay Rayvid (executive producer) et al.	Nominated
1994	Daytime Emmy	Outstanding Directing in a Children's Series	Dana Calderwood	Nominated
1994	Daytime Emmy	Outstanding Achievement in Costume Design	Danajean Cicerchi	Nominated
1994	Daytime Emmy	Outstanding Achievement in Technical Direction/Electronic Camera/Video Control	Richard Wirth (technical director) et al.	Nominated
1994	Daytime Emmy	Outstanding Achievement in Live and Tape Sound Mixing and Sound Effects	Todd Miller (production mixer) et al.	Nominated
1995	Daytime Emmy	Outstanding Art Direction/Set Decoration/Scenic Design	Laura Brock & Jim Fenhagen	Won
1995	Daytime Emmy	Outstanding Performer in a Children's Series	Lynne Thigpen for playing "The Chief"	Nominated
1995	Daytime Emmy	Outstanding Directing in a Children's Series	Hugh Martin	Nominated
1995	Daytime Emmy	Outstanding Children's Series	Kate Taylor (executive producer) & Jay Rayvid (executive producer) et al.	Nominated
1995	Daytime Emmy	Outstanding Costume Design	Danajean Cicerchi	Nominated
1995	Daytime Emmy	Outstanding Achievement in Live and Tape Sound Mixing and Sound Effects	Fritz Lang (production mixer) et al.	Nominated
1996	Image Award	Outstanding Performance in an Educational/Informational Youth or Children's Series/Special	Lynne Thigpen	Nominated
1996	Daytime Emmy	Outstanding Art Direction/Set Direction/Scenic Design	Jim Fenhagen, Laura Brock, Eric Cheripka, Hank Liebeskind	Won
1996	Daytime Emmy	Outstanding Live and Tape Sound Mixing	Tim Lester, Robert Agnello, John Converting, Ronnie Lantz, Billy Straus	Won
1996	Daytime Emmy	Outstanding Children's Series	Jay Rayvid (executive producer) & Kate Taylor (executive producer) et al.	Nominated
1996	Daytime Emmy	Outstanding Performer in a Children's Series	Lynne Thigpen for playing "The Chief"	Nominated
1996	Daytime Emmy	Outstanding Directing in a Children's Series	Hugh Martin	Nominated
1996	Daytime Emmy	Outstanding Costume Design or Costuming	Maria E. Kenny	Nominated
1997	Image Award	Outstanding Youth or Children's Series/Special	Where in the World Is Carmen Sandiego?	Nominated
1997	Daytime Emmy	Outstanding Art Direction/Set Direction/Scenic Design	Jim Fenhagen, Erik Ulfers, Laura Brock	Won

=== Auld Lang Gone ===
An urban legend has circulated on the Net about a missing episode called Auld Lang Gone. Rumor has it that Marc Summers was the episode's guest host, Gene Wilder made an appearance in it, and that the episode was never aired because a contestant broke her arm during production. In 2020, Summers officially confirmed that Auld Lang Gone had never existed: it was an error in numeration that gave rise to rumors about a missing episode.

== International versions ==
Disney's Buena Vista Productions International (BVPI) co-produced the series in Germany with MDR in Chemnitz (formerly Karl-Marx-Stadt) where it aired on national broadcaster ARD and was entitled Jagd um die Welt – Schnappt Carmen Sandiego (Chase Around the World: Catch Carmen Sandiego) in 1994. In the same year, BVPI also co-produced the Italian series in Naples with national broadcaster RAI (entitled Che fine ha fatto Carmen Sandiego?, "What has come of Carmen Sandiego?"), and also co-produced the Spanish version, ¿Dónde se esconde Carmen Sandiego?, ("Where is Carmen Sandiego hiding?") which was co-produced in Valencia with national broadcaster TVE in 1995.

Canada's Télé-Québec produced a French-language version called Mais, où se cache Carmen Sandiego? (But, Where is Carmen Sandiego Hiding?), which aired between 1995 and 1998 and stars Pauline Martin as "The Chief", Martin Drainville as the ACME Agent in Charge of Training New Recruits, and Claire Jacques, Denis Levasseur, Widemir Normil, Denis Trudel as Rockepella (known as Les Voxapellas in French).

There was also a New Zealand version of Carmen Sandiego that lasted from 1995 to 1998, there a talent group called the "Chemistry Boiz" took Rockapella's place. Radio Television of Malaysia produced their own iteration of the show in 1998 titled Di Mana Joe Jambul (Where Is Pompadour Joe). In this version, contestants composed of two teams of three kids try to find clues and stop Pompadour Joe and his gang's criminal activities around the world. The show was rebooted in 2012 with a new set, animation and rules.

Country	Name	Host	Network	Date premiered
Canada	Mais où se cache Carmen Sandiego ?	Pauline Martin and Martin Drainville	Télé-Quebec	1995–1998
France	Mais où se cache Carmen Sandiego ?	Stéphane Roux and Roddy Julienne	France 3	1995–1996
Germany	Jagd um die Welt – Schnappt Carmen Sandiego!	Stefan Pinnow	ARD	1994
Italy	Che fine ha fatto Carmen Sandiego?	Mauro Serio and Giorgia Trasselli	Rai 2	1993–1995
Malaysia	Di Mana Joe Jambul	?	Radio Television of Malaysia	1998; 2012
New Zealand	Where in the World is Carmen Sandiego?	Phil Vaughan and Nina Nawalowalo	TVNZ	1995–1998
Spain	¿Dónde se esconde Carmen Sandiego?	Luis Montalvo and Lola Muñoz	La 2	1995
