= Playing Columbine =

- Produced by: Danny Ledonne
- Edited by: Danny Ledonne
- Music by: Cory Antiel; Josh McKnight
- Release date: November 7, 2008
- Running time: 94 minutes
- Country: United States
- Language: English
- Budget: US$12,000

Playing Columbine: A True Story of Videogame Controversy is a 2008 American documentary film produced and edited by American independent filmmaker Danny Ledonne. The film follows the controversial RPG Maker video game Super Columbine Massacre RPG! in which players experience the Columbine High School massacre through the eyes of the murderers, Eric Harris and Dylan Klebold.

The film is streaming online on YouTube under Ledonne's production company Emberwilde Productions.

== Film content ==
In the documentary, critics and supporters of the game are interviewed, including Ledonne, Jack Thompson, Hal Halpin, Doug Lowenstein, Jason Della Rocca, Jenova Chen, Ian Bogost, Tracy Fullerton, Brian Flemming, and the hosts of Free Talk Live. Arguments are made to support the game's inclusion in a growing movement of videogames with social agendas, referencing other independent games such as McDonald's Video Game, Darfur is Dying, JFK Reloaded, and those made by Persuasive Games.

Supporters of video games such as Greg Costikyan note that the medium of the video game is undergoing the same reactionary criticism as previously experienced by comic books, rock and roll, and Dungeons & Dragons. Some argue that video games will gain more mainstream acceptance as more video game players are in positions of power. The film argues that the medium of the video game should no longer be viewed as a child's toy but rather as a mature form of art (see art game).

The film also examines the link drawn by the Toronto Sun and other media outlets between the Columbine videogame and the 2006 Dawson College shooting. The shooter, Kimveer Gill allegedly listed Super Columbine Massacre RPG! as his favorite game. Melissa Fuller, a Dawson College student at the time of the event, is interviewed and dismisses the game's role in the shooting. However, Jack Thompson maintains that the game is a "murder simulator" that "trained" the shooter. The link between the game and the shooting is regarded as an "easy out for society" by then IGDA executive director Jason Della Rocca.

The final section of the film documents the 2007 controversy at the Slamdance Film Festival in which the Columbine videogame was pulled from the Guerrilla Gamemaker Competition by festival director Peter Baxter. In response, University of Southern California pulled its sponsorship of the competition and half of the other game developers pulled their projects out of the festival. The Slamdance documentary jury attempted to award the game a special jury prize but Baxter prevented the award from being given. Eventually, the game screened at other events such as Living Game Worlds in Gijon, Spain and a gallery installation at University of Colorado at Colorado Springs.

== Slamdance Festival rejection ==
The film was rejected from the 2008 Slamdance Film Festival – which the film notes during the end credits. Ian Bogost at Water Cooler Games observed that "It's certainly no surprise that those 'subjective decisions' would include the rejection of the film, which is openly critical of the festival."

== Release ==
Playing Columbine premiered at AFI Fest in Los Angeles, California on November 7, 2008.

It has also screened at Artfutura, the Bradford Animation Festival, the Denver Film Festival, and the Santa Fe Film Festival.

It has been screened in academic venues such as University of Texas at Dallas, Emerson College and Worcester Polytechnic Institute.

The film has been released online via Amazon Video, iTunes, and Netflix.

== Reception ==
Reacting to the trailer for the film released in July 2007, Brian Crecente wrote at the gaming site Kotaku that, "Judging by the rather short trailer, it feels like the documentary is a little too much about Ledonne and not enough about the very real and complicated issues involving both the shooting and the idea of tacking [sic] serious subject matters with video games."

A first look screening of the film at GameCity in October 2007 prompted Daniel Etherington to write on BBC Collective, "fascinating documentary... Isn’t it time that games were taken seriously?"

He continued:

Although Gus Van Sant and Michael Moore had made films about Columbine, many felt it was wrong to try and [address it] in a game. Why? Why are games not allowed to deal with difficult subjects? In part because the medium is still immature. Ledonne says, "While the commercial games industry has shown itself to be quite comfortable courting controversy over violent content, it has only the beginnings of a truly socially conscious ambition."

A review by Anthony Burch at the videogame blog Destructoid wrote:

Playing Columbine claims to primarily be about the controversy surrounding the director's game, but it wisely opts instead to spend more time talking about the general demonization of videogames as an artistic medium, and the nature of school violence. Super Columbine Massacre RPG! is used as a jumping-off point to discuss much broader, much more interesting issues: for this, the director is to be commended.

Apart from a few self-interviews and lecture clips sprinkled evenly throughout the film, you don't really feel the presence of Ledonne the Director as he tells the story of Ledonne the Designer. The vast majority of the film relies on (quite compelling) interviews with numerous personalities based in or around the games industry -- you'll find immeasurably more directorial intrusion in a typical Michael Moore film. I know that's not saying much, but my point is, this documentary sounds far more pretentious and self-serving than it actually is.

Ledonne assembles a truly noteworthy cast of game designers, media professors, and school shooting survivors who are able to look at the issues he presents from totally different angles. In the first act alone, we get to hear the interviewees talk about games as experimentational play, games as social commentary, and the generation gap between gamers and critics of the medium. Hearing guys like Ian Bogost and Hal Halpin talk about games as art just plain never gets boring, and we've frankly never seen a cast of videogame personalities this large or prestigious assembled in documentary form, and getting to hear all their varying viewpoints is an absolute pleasure.

The film was reviewed by Andrew Barker of Variety in November 2008 and noted:

The ongoing debate over representations of violence in videogames is the immediate focus of "Playing Columbine," Danny Ledonne's gripping, troublemaking docu about the reaction to his videogame re-creation of the Columbine High School massacre. But the film goes much further, ultimately tying questions of propriety and censorship into a larger discussion of the development of videogames as a form of expressive art. While it raises far more questions that it can answer, pic serves as an impressively nuanced call for games to be taken more seriously.

Mark Fulton of Film Threat wrote:

The documentary is very engaging and thought provoking though repetitive at times. Ledonne is a talented filmmaker, and I’m curious to see him tackle subjects not as personally close. "Playing Columbine" is an asset to the ongoing dialogue on protected speech and questions of art in the 21st century.

== See also ==
- Artistic freedom
- Spencer Halpin's Moral Kombat
- Bowling for Columbine — Michael Moore's 2002 Oscar-winning documentary film exploring American gun culture
- Elephant — Gus van Sant's 2003 Palme D'Or-winning film similar in content
- Video games as an art form
