= Danny Ledonne =

American film director

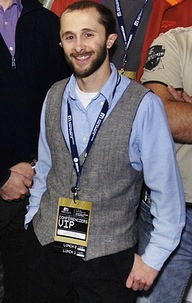
- Ledonne at the Montreal Independent Games Summit in November 2007
- Born: Alamosa, Colorado, U.S.
- Education: American University (MFA)
- Occupations: Film director, producer
- Years active: 2002–present

Danny A. Ledonne is an American film director and former video game developer. From 2011 to 2014, he worked as a professor in Film and Media Arts at American University, served on the board of the Southern Colorado Film Commission, and became the director for the 2015 edition of the festival. He is known for the documentary Playing Columbine, about the controversy surrounding his 2005 video game Super Columbine Massacre RPG!.

In 2025, Ledonne published his debut novel End of the Tracks: Homecoming, a near-future literary fiction set amid societal and environmental collapse.

== Early life and education ==
Ledonne was born in Alamosa, Colorado. He attended Alamosa High School in Colorado. He graduated from school with a 4.0 grade point average and was voted "most likely to succeed" by his peers. He went on to study film at Emerson College in Boston, Massachusetts. It was during his time at college that he discovered a program called RPG Maker, which allowed a developer to create and design their own games for the PC.

Ledonne obtained a Master of Fine Arts in Film & Electronic Media from American University in Washington, D.C. Ledonne also obtained a J.D. from the Gonzaga University School of Law in Spokane, Washington with a focus on intellectual property law. During law school, he was an editor of the Gonzaga Journal of International Law. He was also the team captain for the Saul Lefkowitz Moot Court Competition in trademark law and worked in an immigration law clinic. Later, he worked as an associate attorney on copyright matters for artists and authors.

== Early career ==
In 2005, Ledonne released his first and to date only video game, called Super Columbine Massacre RPG!, that replayed the events of the Columbine High School massacre. Ledonne created the game to explore what caused the gunmen to commit the atrocity and to dispel the myths that violent video games had played a role in the massacre. Upon its release, the game was met with heavy criticism from the public and the mainstream media over the subject matter of the RPG, and even led PC World to declare the game #2 on its list of "The 10 Worst Games of All Time."

Ledonne defended the game despite its negative reaction, saying that the story of the attackers resonated with his own experience at school.

"I was an easy target to be picked on, and that started in kindergarten... It was the kind of bullying that most kids who were bullied experienced... When you get pushed every day, and when you are ostracized not once, not twice, but years in and out, your perception of reality is distorted... These things really do warp your understanding and your perception of humanity in some almost irrevocable way.

== Film career ==
Upon graduating from college, Ledonne worked on narrative and documentary short films such as Solace, The Unbelievable Truth, The Good Life, Super 7, and Wild Animals, Domesticated Humans (which he wrote and directed). In 2002, he produced and directed a Brickfilm animated adaptation of "Ship of Fools", a cautionary parable of industrial society written from prison by Ted Kaczynski.

In 2007, he produced and edited the full-length documentary Playing Columbine. The film features over fifty interviews with game industry leaders, theorists, and developers, authors, filmmakers, journalists, elected officials, school shooting survivors, concerned citizens, festival organizers, media activists, free speech loyalists, and video game players. The film chronicles the controversy surrounding Super Columbine Massacre RPG!. It also features numerous other independent games, and film examines the video game/real world violence debate as well as exploring the future of interactive media's potential to confront serious issues.

The film features notable figures including Jack Thompson, Hal Halpin, Doug Lowenstein, Jason Della Rocca, Jenova Chen, Brian Flemming, and the hosts of Free Talk Live. It was screened at film festivals such as the Denver Film Festival and AFI Fest.

In 2011, Ledonne released his second documentary, Duck! (A Documentary), which explores the different species and natures of ducks across North America.

== Teaching career and Adams State lawsuit ==
In May 2011, Ledonne became a part-time film instructor at the Adams State University in Alamosa, Colorado. He taught three courses per semester under the mass communication program and carried out video production services on behalf of the university. He also served on the board of the Southern Colorado Film Commission for a number of years, and became the festival's director in 2015. Ledonne was later made a full-time visiting professor, with full benefits.

During the latter months of his final contract with the university, Ledonne established the website Watching Adams, a blog that discussed and often criticized the institution's administrators. In many of his posts, Ledonne brought light to a situation regarding significant differences in the pay structure between administrative and academic staff. In some cases, it was demonstrated that athletic and administrative staff made 120 percent or more of industry benchmarks, and that academic faculty made 80 percent or less.

Within two days of the post regarding the pay structure, University President Beverlee McClure issued Ledonne with a "No Trespass Order" of the university campus and its buildings, on the grounds that his behavior was deemed to be disruptive, detrimental and posed a safety risk to the university. The university labelled Ledonne as a "terrorist" and said that any attempt to enter the campus would result in being arrested. The ban also prohibited Ledonne from attending the 2015 edition of the Southern Colorado Film Festival, of which he was the president; he was therefore forced to resign from his post.

In February 2016, the ACLU launched a legal bid to reverse the ban on the grounds that the university had no legitimate basis for banning Ledonne and that the action had been defamatory to his character as there was no evidence that he had ever engaged in any threats of violence, direct or indirect, toward anyone or anything at the university. The action was intended to vindicate Ledonne's First Amendment right to criticize the operations of the university. Both parties eventually entered into mediation before a former federal judge. This resulted in a settlement agreement in which Adams State University would repeal the ban and pay $100,000 in compensation.

Speaking about the settlement, Ledonne said via a statement from the ACLU:

I sought this legal action to challenge the university's heavy-handed attempt to discourage me and others who disagree with the administration from speaking out... I am very satisfied with the settlement and look forward to continuing my work in this community.

== Campaign work ==
In 2013, Ledonne helped found the Keep Polston Public group in Alamosa, Colorado. The group was formed in opposition to the handover of the derelict site of the former Polston Elementary School to a private enterprise, which planned to transform the area into an RV resort and demolish the community garden that had occupied the site during the school's operational years in the late 1990s and after its closure. As the only Alamosa native in the KPP and a former pupil of the school, Ledonne played a crucial role in the organization. He helped the group work with legal consultants to challenge the school's decision, citing that it may have been illegal on several counts. After the challenge failed, the group filed a lawsuit alleging that the school board had violated Colorado Open Meeting Law, the state's constitution and the Colorado Public Schools Act procedure for sale of real estate. In 2014, the group agreed to drop the lawsuit in exchange for the chance to buy the property for $900,000. The full sum was successfully raised and the property was purchased by the Trust for Public Land. It is now owned outright by the San Luis Valley Local Foods Coalition.

== Writing ==
Ledonne published his debut novel, End of the Tracks: Homecoming, in 2025. The book is a work of literary fiction set in 2045 in a post-collapse society. The plot follows four college friends who reunite two decades after a wildfire destroyed their university.

== Awards ==
Year	Nominated work	Awards	Category	Result
2010	EcoViews; Reclaiming the Bay	CINE Competition	Best Documentary (Student) (shared with Ted Roach, Alex Morrison, Caroline Aguilar, Suzanne C. Taylor, Dustin Harrison-Atlas, Brad Allgood, Sandy Cannon-Brown, J.P. Eason and Brad Lambert)	Won
2010	EcoViews; Reclaiming the Bay	Student Academy Awards	Best Documentary (shared with Ted Roach, Alex Morrison, Caroline Aguilar, Suzanne C. Taylor, Dustin Harrison-Atlas, Brad Allgood, Sandy Cannon-Brown, J.P. Eason and Brad Lambert)	Nominated
