= V-Tech Rampage =

2007 video game

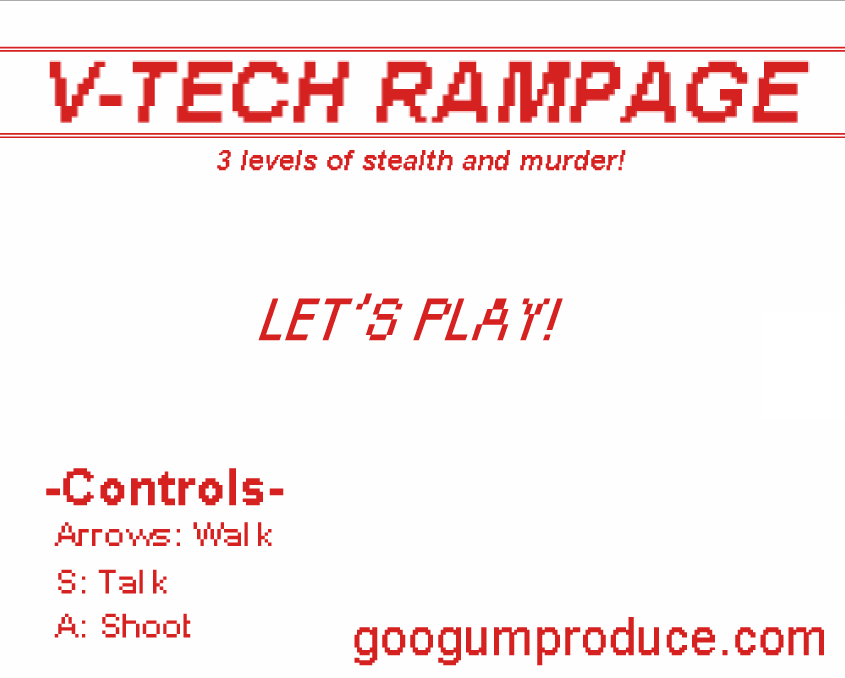
- Title screen
- Developer: Ryan Lambourn
- Platform: Adobe Flash Player
- Release: 12 May 2007
- Genre: Action
- Mode: Single-player

V-Tech Rampage is a 2007 action game created by Australian amateur video game developer Ryan Lambourn. The game recreates the Virginia Tech shooting, and was released on 12 May 2007 on Newgrounds, less than a month after the shooting occurred.

The previous prominent virtual school shooting reenactment Super Columbine Massacre RPG!, a role-playing video game, has received praise for artistic merit as well as condemnation. V-Tech Rampage was created to be offensive without redeeming value.

In 2013, Lambourn caused further controversy with his game The Slaying of Sandy Hook Elementary, which re-created the Sandy Hook Elementary School shooting. Unlike V-Tech Rampage, however, The Slaying of Sandy Hook Elementary was created to support gun control laws.

== Gameplay ==
The game is a one-person work released three weeks after the Virginia Tech shooting. Its graphics and controls are intentionally clumsy. The player controls Seung-Hui Cho, the killer, through "3 levels of stealth and murder!" in a slanted overhead view. In the first level, the player must walk across the Virginia Tech campus to shoot Emily J. Hilscher, Cho's real-life first victim, without killing too many other people or scaring Emily away. Emily's death is witnessed by Ryan Clark, Cho's second victim, who also must be killed. In the second, he must walk across the same campus while avoiding the searchlights of police investigators. In the third, he barricades the exit of a school building and must shoot everyone inside in 90 seconds before the police arrive to arrest him. During this level, a song created by Lambourn plays while audio clips praise, laugh at murder, or scold the player for merely wounding. Liviu Librescu is the only real victim to appear in this segment. The game concludes with Cho's suicide, which occurs when the player presses the shoot button.

Cho monologues about mission goals and can also speak to other characters, whose reactions differ depending on whether they're fleeing Cho or not. The game's dialogue has occasional grammar or spelling errors and is riddled with obscenities, insults, racist terms, scatological references, and offers of sex from female characters in exchange for their lives.

== Events ==
Lambourn offered to remove the game if he received $2,000 in "donations". For an additional $1,000, he offered to apologize.

Attention angry people: I will take this game down from newgrounds (the games website) if the donation amount reaches $1000 US. I'll take it down from here [his website] if it reaches $2000 US, and I will apologise if it reaches $3000 US.

Lambourn later retracted the offer to remove the game, stating:

...the donation thing is there as a joke against all the people commanding me to take my game down. I didn't think anyone would donate money to it and so far my paypal account has proven me right...

Lambourn stated that although he felt sympathy for the friends and family members of the victims, he also felt sympathy for the perpetrator: "No one listens to you unless you've got something sensational to do. And that's why I feel sympathy for Cho Seung-hui. He had to go that far."

Less than a month after the game's release, a "RIAA edition" was created with the original tracks removed due to copyright infringement with the RIAA. This has replaced the original version on Newgrounds. The original edition was available on Lambourn's site, however it was removed in July 2007 due to further threats from the RIAA. Now the RIAA edition is the only available one on his site, with the title music "Hey, hey, hey, fuck the RIAA!" on a looped track, but the unedited version with the original music can still be found. The MP3 of the music in question can also be acquired.

With the release of the RIAA edition, the copyrighted in-game tracks were replaced with MIDI versions of the originals, including the song "Shine" by Collective Soul, which was Cho's favorite song in real life.

== Reception and impact ==
The game was compared to Super Columbine Massacre RPG!, due to the re-creation of a mass murder in which the player controls the killer through a video game. Danny Ledonne, creator of Super Columbine Massacre RPG! posted a comment on Lambourn's website:

Inevitably, comparisons between [Super Columbine Massacre RPG!] and [V-Tech Rampage] are being made right now... For myself I wish to point out that [Super Columbine Massacre RPG!] was never a for-profit endeavor and thus I never posted statements like that which is on the [V-Tech Rampage] game's homepage (...) I would like to ask bloggers to consider not whether a game about the Virginia Tech shooting SHOULD be made but how we might go about making a game that accomplishes more than [V-Tech Rampage] does with the subject matter.

New York State Senator Andrew Lanza, chair of the Senate Task Force on Youth Violence and the Entertainment Industry requested that the gaming community boycott the game. However, video game publications wrote of concerns about backlashes against video games and wrote that this game was created by an individual, not the gaming industry.

GamesRadar+ ranked the game as 4th in the Top 7 Most Evil Games.

== See also ==
- Super Columbine Massacre RPG!
