= 2006 Dawson College shooting =

Mass shooting in Montreal, Canada

Coordinates: 45°29′22″N 73°35′14″W

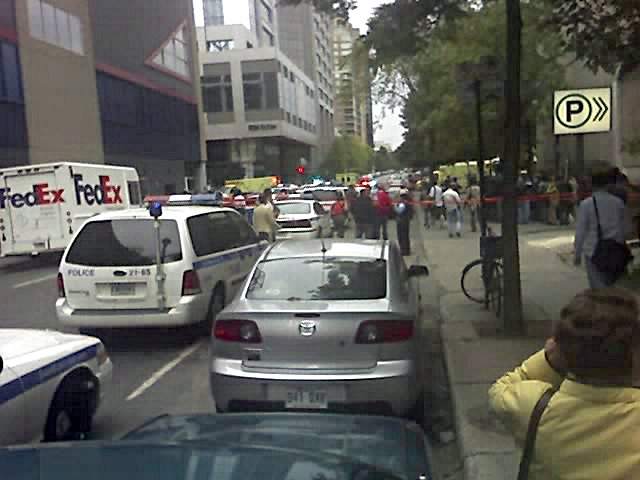
- The Dawson College campus on de Maisonneuve Boulevard minutes after the shooting
- Location: Montreal, Quebec, Canada
- Date: September 13, 2006; 20 years ago 12:42 – 1:01 p.m. (EDT)
- Target: Dawson College
- Attack type: School shooting; murder-suicide; mass shooting; hostage taking
- Weapons: Beretta Cx4 Storm semi-automatic carbine; Glock 21 .45-calibre semi-automatic pistol; Norinco HP9-1 short pump-action shotgun (unused)
- Deaths: 2 (including the perpetrator)
- Injuries: 19
- Perpetrator: Kimveer Gill
- Motive: Various, personal stress, depression, misanthropy

On September 13, 2006, 25-year-old Kimveer Singh Gill opened fire at Dawson College, a CEGEP located in downtown Montreal, Quebec, Canada. Gill began by shooting outside the de Maisonneuve Boulevard entrance to the school, before moving towards the atrium by the cafeteria on the main floor. One victim died at the scene, while another 19 were injured, eight of whom were listed in critical condition, with six requiring surgery. The shooter later committed suicide, after being shot in the arm by a police officer. It was the third fatal school shooting in Montreal, after the École Polytechnique massacre in 1989 and the shooting spree at Concordia University in 1992.

== Shooting ==
1. 12:30: Shooter exits his car.; 2. 12:41: First shots fired outside entrance.; 3. 12:44: Nearby officers rush to the scene.; 4. 12:42–1:01: Gunman fires on students in the cafeteria. Police shoot him in the arm, he kills himself with a shot to the head.; 5. 1:30: Killer's body is dragged outside and covered.

Shortly before 12:40 p.m. EDT, Gill parked his car on de Maisonneuve Boulevard about 100 metres from the college campus, and was seen removing bags and a semi-automatic carbine from his trunk by bystanders. One of the bystanders called 911 to report Gill. As Gill walked towards the college, he briefly took a passerby hostage, forcing him to carry a bag containing the Norinco shotgun, four knives, a crowbar, and additional ammunition. As Gill and the hostage approached the college, they saw a police vehicle pull over outside the college. Two police officers were visiting the school at the time regarding an unrelated incident about a drug deal.

Upon seeing the police car, Gill fired 10 shots from his carbine at students outside on the rear entrance steps, emptying the gun. The hostage fled the scene, throwing Gill's bag away. The first shots were fired at 12:42:01 p.m. Gill injured several students outside the college before jumping over a small wall to enter the school. One of the police officers got out of his vehicle and chased Gill into the college, shouting at him to drop his weapon.

Gill entered the school at 12:42:12 p.m., making his way to the school cafeteria almost directly ahead of the school entrance. At 12:42:24 p.m., Gill positioned himself in the corner of the building, near a vending machine, setting his bag and carbine on the floor. He loaded a Glock pistol and shot students standing in front of him, wounding several including Anastasia De Sousa. The police officer who chased Gill tried to approach him and leaned against a wall in the cafeteria. Gill reloaded his carbine and fired at the officer. The officer's partner arrived to assist him. After Gill had fired at the officers for several minutes, taunting them, both officers were told by a sergeant to fall back.

Gill then fired at students crawling to escape the atrium. After wounding students and an employee of the college, Gill took a male student hostage. The hostage lied to Gill about the locations of officers. Gill asked if De Sousa was dead. The hostage said that he didn't know but pleaded with Gill to be allowed to take her outside, promising to come back. Gill asked another student if De Sousa was dead, who also told Gill that he didn't know. Gill fired several more shots into De Sousa from his carbine, yelling, "Now she's dead!"

Additional police officers arrived at the college. Some entered the floor above the cafeteria while others surrounded the campus. One of the officers shouted at Gill from the floor above. He exchanged gunfire with Gill, nearly shooting him. The officer fell back and repositioned himself. At one point, Gill aimed his Glock under his chin while announcing that it was his last day. He was interrupted by movement from the floor above and began firing in that direction with his carbine.

Throughout the standoff, Gill repeatedly peeked out from behind a corner and also tried stepping out before returning.

At 1:01 p.m., Gill took two students hostage, including the student he had previously taken hostage. He ordered one hostage to retrieve a bag filled with ammunition, then forced the hostages to precede him as he walked north. Officer Denis Côté, who was located on the floor above, fired two quick shots at Gill at 1:01:36 p.m. Gill was struck in the right elbow, the bullet only going through muscle. Gill's carbine was also shot in its stock, which struck Gill in the chest causing a bruise. Gill fell to his knees and placed the Glock in his mouth before shooting himself at 1:01:42 p.m. At the same time, Côté fired two more shots, hitting a garbage can.

The police officers attempted to resuscitate him, but failed. At 1:30 p.m., police officers dragged Gill's body outside, covered it with a yellow bag, then continued the evacuation and the search for possible accomplices. Authorities concluded the attack was premeditated, after a short suicide note was found on Gill's body during the autopsy.

The shooter discharged his rifle 72 times and his pistol six times during the shooting.

The television network TVA reported that security camera footage from Place Alexis Nihon showed Gill staking out the area as far back as August 10, more than a month before the shootings.

== Victims ==
The police confirmed the death of one victim, an 18-year-old woman who was shot in the abdomen and died on the scene. Canadian newspapers later identified the woman as Anastasia Rebecca De Sousa. She had been shot a total of nine times. Part of Dawson's Peace Garden is dedicated to her memory.

The Montreal Police Service later reported that 19 other people had been wounded. One victim, who was reportedly at Dawson College to visit friends, suffered two shots to the head. He underwent intensive surgery; the doctors removed one bullet, and he remained in a coma for one week after the shooting as doctors determined whether they should try to remove the second bullet. After two weeks on a ventilator, he emerged from the coma and as of 3 November 2006 was recovering.

== Investigation ==
Police initially looked for as many as three suspects, but Montreal Police Chief Yvan Delorme later confirmed that there was only one shooter, who shot himself fatally on the scene. Many eyewitnesses described a man with a Mohawk hairstyle, wearing a black trench coat, black trousers with metal studs, and combat boots. The suspect carried three weapons, including a semi-automatic carbine. That evening, a Sûreté du Québec spokesperson confirmed to LCN TV reporters that the shooter was a 25-year-old male, born in Québec. Police found his car, a black Pontiac Sunfire, parked close to the school, and later searched the house where he lived with his mother, seizing a computer and other belongings.

Around midnight on Wednesday, police confirmed to the media that the suspect was Kimveer Gill, a 25-year-old Laval resident, a graduate from Rosemere High School. An autopsy later revealed that Gill committed suicide after being hit in the arm by police officer Denis Côté's gunfire. It was revealed that Gill's actions were premeditated; a short suicide note was found on Gill's body.

During a police search at Gill's home, an apology note to his family was found. In addition, police seized firearm accessories including holsters and manuals, including those of the firearm he used during the attack; they also found a letter praising the actions of Columbine shooters Eric Harris and Dylan Klebold.

== Aftermath ==
Police cordoned off the campus area and swept the school for students left inside. Local radio reports placed the number of police vehicles at approximately 80 and up to 24 ambulances surrounded the building. Students and faculty were evacuated from the campus or left the vicinity of the shooting.

Two shopping centres adjacent to Dawson, Place Alexis Nihon and Westmount Square, directly linked to the Atwater metro station, were evacuated and the green line of the Montreal Metro was shut down for several hours between Lionel-Groulx and McGill. The Pepsi Forum entertainment centre, opposite the eastern corner of Dawson, was open when many of the students came running into the premises moments after the shooting began. Shortly afterward, the Pepsi Forum went into lockdown under the directives of the Montreal Police. Eventually, one of the Forum's entrances onto St. Catherine Street re-opened under police/security guard to allow monitored access and egress.

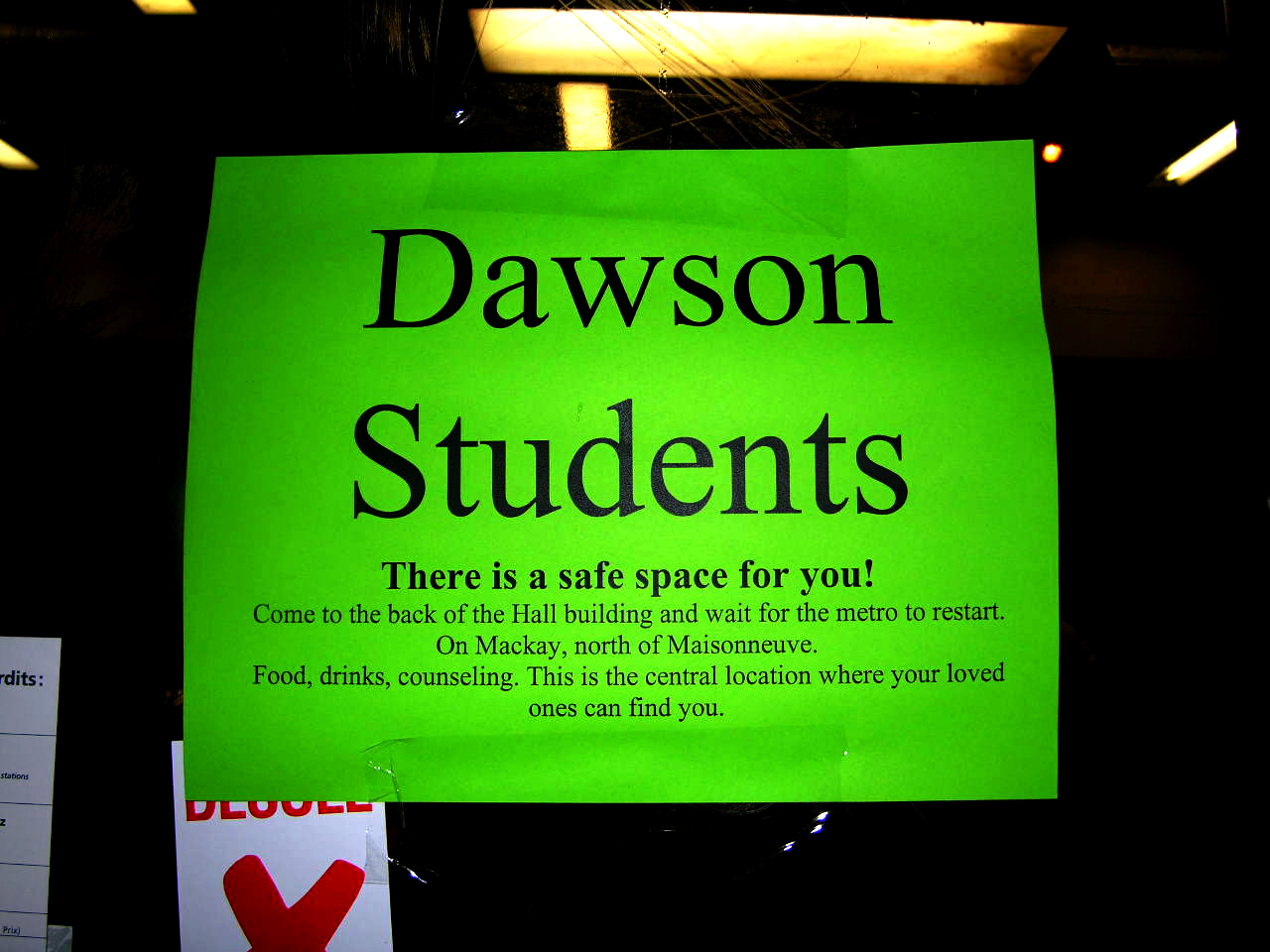
Sign on the door of a downtown Montreal metro station in the afternoon of the shooting, inviting Dawson students to Concordia University for shelter while subway service is halted.

A large number of the evacuees were also directed to the nearby Concordia University, where the Concordia Student Union (CSU) is located. The CSU cancelled all remaining Orientation activities, and instead used its venues to temporarily shelter the evacuated Dawson students and provide them with food, water, blankets, and phones to reach other loved ones. A coordination team was put in place from the CSU, and the DSU used the Sir George Williams campus as a temporary crisis centre and offered counselling (psychologist, psychiatrist) to traumatized students and staff. Claude Dauphin (Mayor of the borough of Lachine and vice-president of the City of Montreal executive committee) had a very close relationship with both of the student unions during the night of the events; Dauphin went to the CSU office's the night of the shooting to meet with both unions to inform them of what the city was doing, and to ask how he could help.

The police also established several phone numbers for parents and friends of the students.

Police reported that they needed a few days to process the crime scene. As a result, officials from Dawson College stated that the school would be closed until Monday, September 18, 2006, scheduled to open its doors at 11:00 a.m. and remain open until 7:00 p.m. and have an "Open House" feel to the day. Classes were scheduled to resume as usual on Tuesday, September 19, 2006.

A follow-up study conducted by the McGill University Health Centre Research Institute found that 30% of Dawson students at the time of the shooting suffered mental health consequences including post-traumatic stress disorder, major depression, alcohol dependence, and social phobia, a level twice that found in the general population. Approximately 18% of respondents developed a mental health disorder despite never having had one before.

== Perpetrator ==
Kimveer Gill was a 25-year-old Canadian born on 9 July 1981 in Lachine, Quebec, Canada. His parents were of Punjabi descent, and moved to Saint-Laurent, Quebec from India in early 1981. The family later settled in the Fabreville area of Laval, Quebec in 1987. Kimveer attended Twin Oaks Elementary School in Laval from 1988 to 1993.

Gill later attended Rosemere High School, where he was remembered by teachers as quiet and unassuming. Despite early media reports, he performed well academically, and most students remember him as having friends and certainly never being bullied. Kimveer graduated from Rosemere High School in June 1998. He enrolled in Vanier College, however, he dropped out in January 1999.

Gill briefly received military training from the Canadian Forces Leadership and Recruit School in Saint-Jean-sur-Richelieu, Quebec, from January 17 to February 16, 1999. He had told his friends he wished to eventually become a mercenary. He did not complete his basic training for unknown reasons. He was deemed unsuitable for military service and was voluntarily discharged before receiving extensive weapons training. Gill was a member of a rifle club and visited the Ville Saint-Pierre facility the day prior to the shooting.

Gill's profile was discovered on a website called VampireFreaks under the screen name "fatality666." He had stated, "I hate this world, I hate the people in it, I hate the way people live, I hate God, I hate the deceivers, I hate betrayers, I hate religious zealots, I hate everything," in March. The last login was at 10:35 a.m. on the day of the shooting. The profile was subsequently restricted to registered users, and then removed entirely.

Gill was armed with a Beretta Cx4 Storm pistol-caliber carbine, a Glock pistol (reports are conflicting as to whether this was chambered in 9mm or .45 ACP), and a shotgun. There were reports of an additional firearm in a bag that he forced a hostage to bring along as he arrived near the campus site. According to TVA's crime reporter Claude Poirier, Gill briefly held a lawyer hostage and demanded that he bring the bag containing the fourth gun and additional ammunition. When the first shots were fired and police arrived, the lawyer fled the scene and hid Gill's bag.

== Response ==
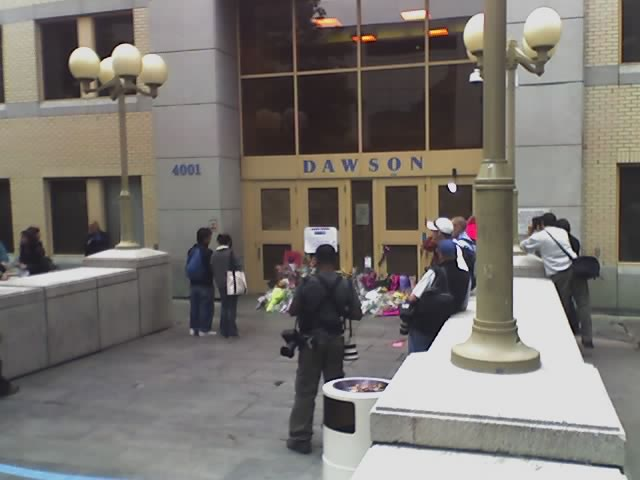
Two days after the event, people bring flowers to the de Maisonneuve entrance, where the first shots had been fired.

=== Students and faculty ===
Some student leaders criticized the immediate response of the Dawson College administration. The Chronicle of Higher Education reported that "if it hadn't been for help from the Student Union at nearby Concordia University... many of the Dawson students would have had no one to turn to for help."

Dawson's director-general Richard Filion called the student charges harsh. "We did our best to evacuate the building. We were in a state of shock. We were scattered everywhere around the city," Filion said, noting many staff members were out on lunch break. Dawson does have an emergency plan, he said, but it was designed with fire safety in mind.

Filion announced that staff and faculty would return to the College on Friday, September 15, and that classes would resume on Tuesday, September 19, 2006. The school invited all students to join them on Monday, September 18, 2006, to meet with staff and faculty for information and support, as well as to retrieve belongings that had been left behind. It was announced that grief counseling and support services would be available on an ongoing basis.

In addition, one of the victims, 18-year-old Hayder Kadhim, who received two bullet wounds to the head and neck, challenged Prime Minister Stephen Harper to a gun control debate in a public speech on CBC in response to the shooting.

=== Politicians ===
- Canadian Prime Minister Stephen Harper stated the shootings were "...a cowardly and senseless act of violence..."
- Interim Liberal Party leader Bill Graham and Member of Parliament (MP) Lucienne Robillard: "We must act as a country to show our compassion for those whose lives have been dramatically altered by this inexplicable event."
- Bloc Québécois Leader Gilles Duceppe: "It's tragic. We can never explain why these things happen. At the Polytechnique women were targeted. But here, we have no idea." Duceppe also suggested the need for a national gun registry.
- New Democratic Party Leader Jack Layton mentioned that it "was a grim reminder of previous school shootings" and that it hit particularly close to home for him; Layton was born and raised in a suburb of Montreal and attended McGill University, a short distance from Dawson College.
- Quebec Premier Jean Charest stated "We are deeply saddened for the victims, the families, the parents of the children who study at Dawson."
- Montreal Mayor Gérald Tremblay stated "This is so tragic. How do we talk to the parents who are going through this? All I can say is that I feel for them, and I care for them."

=== Video gaming community ===
- Danny Ledonne, creator of Super Columbine Massacre RPG!, expressed his sorrow at the shootings, asked members of his web site to "... be aware of the sensitive nature of Montreal right now and of those who were affected by this shooting," and explained how his game is not designed to train shooters.
- Ian Bogost of Water Cooler Games says "A tragedy like this saddens and disturbs us all... Gill was a disturbed man [...] he clearly needed help he did not get."

== Complaints about media coverage ==
Monique Lépine (mother of Marc Lépine, the perpetrator of the École Polytechnique massacre) spoke out in wake of the shooting, the first time she had ever done so since her son's massacre 16 years prior.

=== Jan Wong controversy ===
An immediate controversy arose about an article regarding the Dawson shootings by journalist Jan Wong, of the Toronto-based The Globe and Mail. Three days after the event, Wong, who was born and raised in Montreal and is the daughter of Chinese immigrants, wrote a front-page piece titled Get under the desk, in which she drew a link between all three school shootings in Quebec history (the École Polytechnique, the Concordia University and the Dawson College killings) and the nature of Quebec society under its protective language laws.

Wong suggested the fact that the three perpetrators were not old-stock French Quebecers (the shooters were Algerian, Belarusian, and Punjabi in descent) was related to their murderous actions since, she claimed, they were alienated from a Quebec society concerned with "racial purity." Accused of "Quebec bashing," Wong's writing soon created public outcry in Quebec and political condemnation. Quebec Premier Jean Charest called the article a "disgrace", stating that it "betrays an ignorance of Canadian values and a profound misunderstanding of Québec." On September 20, 2006, Prime Minister Stephen Harper pronounced it "prejudiced, absurd, irresponsible and without foundation"; the same day, the House of Commons of Canada unanimously passed a motion requesting an apology for the column.

Wong's writing followed the comments of Professor Elliott Leyton, a social-anthropologist who is a widely consulted expert on serial homicide. Interviewed by CBC Newsworld on September 14, 2006, about the 2006 Dawson College shooting, Leyton stated that because all three such murderous rampages in Quebec involved a killer who was either an immigrant or a child of immigrants, it warranted an examination of government and societal attitudes.

=== Broadcast Code violation ===
In 2007, the Canadian Broadcast Standards Council faulted CKNW, a radio station in Vancouver, British Columbia for airing "potentially dangerous information" during the 2006 Dawson College shooting. During the incident, CKNW had simulcast content from its sister stations in Montreal which included students speaking by cellphone from inside the school. A Vancouver man complained that the content could have told the gunman where the students were. The council said that as a result of modern technology reducing geographic distance as a barrier, CKNW had breached Section 10 (coverage of violent situations) of the broadcast code. The station broadcast the decision as required, but did not air an apology.

=== Megadeth ===
Gill mentioned the song "A Tout le Monde" by the thrash metal band Megadeth on his blog on VampireFreaks.com on the day of the shooting. Megadeth was blamed for the shooting by many news outlets and watchdog groups as a result.

Later in 2006, Megadeth performed live in Montreal, and responded to the blame that had been placed on the band and their music as a result. Band leader Dave Mustaine told the crowd:

The guy who went to Dawson College and shot everyone, it's terrible. Aside from the fact that what he did was wrong, we have a relationship with Montreal, and that really pissed us off.

Before the concert in an interview for CBC News Mustaine said:

I was so angry that this guy would use my song, and that he would try and turn that beautiful song into something ugly and nasty. It's for those who lost their lives, and it's a gift to those who are in the process of healing (...) and Gill was not worthy of being a Megadeth fan.

=== Natural Born Killers ===
This is the ninth mass killing to implicate the movie Natural Born Killers, per the gunman's blog at vampirefreaks.com, which he called one of his favourites. At some point prior to September 20, 2006, the blog was deleted.
