= Super Columbine Massacre RPG! =

2005 role-playing video game

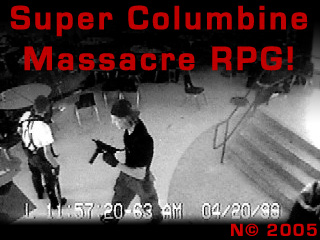
- The title card of Super Columbine Massacre RPG!, featuring security camera footage of Harris and Klebold in the Columbine school cafeteria
- Designer: Danny Ledonne
- Writer: Danny Ledonne
- Engine: RPG Maker 2000
- Platform: Windows
- Release: April 20, 2005
- Genre: Role-playing
- Mode: Single-player

Super Columbine Massacre RPG! is a 2005 role-playing video game created by Danny Ledonne. The game recreates the 1999 Columbine High School shooting in Littleton, Colorado. Players assume the roles of gunmen Eric Harris and Dylan Klebold and act out the massacre, with flashbacks relating parts of Harris' and Klebold's past experiences. The game begins on the day of the shooting and follows Harris and Klebold after their suicide to fictional adventures in perdition.

Ledonne had spent many years conceptualizing games, but never created one due to his lack of game design and programming knowledge. He was inspired to create a video game about Columbine by his own experience, being bullied and the effect the shooting had on his life. The game represents a critique of how traditional media sensationalized the shooting, as well as parodying video games themselves. Super Columbine Massacre was created with ASCII's game development program RPG Maker 2000 and took approximately six months to complete. Ledonne initially published the game anonymously, releasing an artist's statement about the work after his identity was revealed. Super Columbine Massacre was released for free online and attracted little attention until 2006, when widespread media coverage fueled hundreds of thousands of downloads.

Upon release in April 2005, reaction to Super Columbine Massacre was negative. The title was criticized for trivializing the victims of the shooting and the actions of Harris and Klebold. The game's cartoon presentation and the side-plot into hell were considered by critics as obscuring the game's message, but it received minor note as a game that transcended the stereotypical associations of the medium as entertainment for children. Super Columbine Massacre's themes and content led to it being included in discussions as to whether video games cause violence; the title was later listed as a possible motivating factor of the 2006 Dawson College shooting. The game has been described as an art game, and Ledonne has become a spokesperson for video games as an art form, producing a documentary in 2008 called Playing Columbine about his game and its impact.

== Gameplay ==
A screenshot of Super Columbine Massacre's battle screen, with an enemy student, player actions and character health shown

Super Columbine Massacre RPG! is a role-playing video game. Players control the actions of teenagers Eric Harris and Dylan Klebold; the pair entered Colorado's Columbine High School on April 20, 1999, and killed 13 people before turning their guns on themselves in a library. Much of the game takes place in a third-person view, with players controlling Harris and Klebold from an overhead perspective. The graphics and characters are deliberately reminiscent of a 16-bit-era video game; while the content is violent, the violence is not graphically rendered.

When players engage in battle, the screen changes to a first-person view of the enemy; enemies are named by stereotypes or occupations, such as "Preppy girl", "Janitor", "Math teacher" and "Jock Type". Combat has two options: "auto play", where the game chooses the weapon to use, or "manual play", in which the player decides to use a hand-to-hand weapon, explosive, gun, or defensive maneuver against foes. Once a battle starts, it is impossible to avoid or escape; the player must kill the enemy or die themselves. Text narrates battle events and actions such as finding a bag or gaining a weapon.

As the game proceeds, flashbacks occur showing events in Harris and Klebold's lives which may have caused them to commit murder; real life events are compressed into the game's timeframe for narrative purposes. Much of the plot is constructed around the events as they are believed to have occurred; lines of the gunmen's dialogue are often lifted verbatim from their writings or from their own home videos of each other. In contrast to the 16-bit graphics are digitized photographs from the shooting or full voice samples from news reports; photos of the school are used as backdrops during battle scenes.

== Plot ==
The game begins as Eric Harris' mother wakes him on April 20, 1999. Harris phones Dylan Klebold, and the pair meet in Harris' basement to plot a series of bombings that will precede their planned shooting. The two reminisce about the bullying they experienced at Columbine High and express rage at those they perceive to be their tormentors. Harris and Klebold make a video, apologizing to their parents, collect their weapons, and leave home.

At school, the pair plant timed propane bombs without being detected by security cameras or hall monitors. After the explosives are set, the two stop for a moment on a hill outside the school, discussing their alienation and hostility. After the bombs fail to explode as planned, Harris and Klebold decide to enter the school and murder as many people as they can; the final number killed is up to the player. After roaming around the school shooting innocents, Harris and Klebold commit suicide. A montage of clips showing Harris and Klebold's corpses, students comforting each other, and childhood photos of the gunmen plays.

The game's second half finds Klebold alone in Hell. After combating demons and monsters from the video game Doom, Klebold reunites with Harris, and they profess their enthusiasm for the opportunity to live out their favorite video game. The pair find themselves at the "Isle of Lost Souls", where they meet fictional characters such as Pikachu, Bart Simpson, Mega Man, Mario and personalities including J. Robert Oppenheimer, JonBenét Ramsey, Malcolm X, Ronald Reagan, and John Lennon. Next, they deliver a copy of Ecce Homo to Friedrich Nietzsche before fighting the South Park design of Satan. Upon their victory, Satan congratulates them for their deeds.

The game returns to Columbine High School, where a press conference addresses the murders. Some of the dialogue appears precisely as it was spoken after the actual event, while other lines caricature the political forces at work in the aftermath of the murders. The conference references gun control advocacy, religious fundamentalism, and the media's implication of Marilyn Manson and the video games they played as culpable in the shooting.

== Development ==
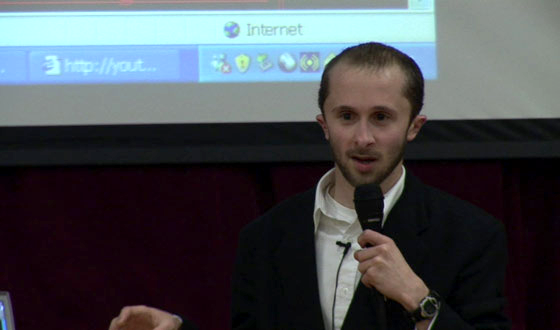
Ledonne became an unwitting spokesman for video games, despite intending Super Columbine Massacre to be the only game he created.

Super Columbine Massacre was created by Danny Ledonne of Alamosa, Colorado, then a student and independent filmmaker. As a high school student, the Columbine High School massacre resonated with Ledonne, who said that he himself had once been "a loner", "a misfit" and "a bullied kid" in high school like the shooters. "I was an easy target to be picked on, and that started in kindergarten", he said. "It was the kind of bullying that most kids who were bullied experienced [...] When you get pushed every day, and when you are ostracized not once, not twice, but years in and out, your perception of reality is distorted [...] These things really do warp your understanding and your perception of humanity in some almost irrevocable way", he said.

In 1999, director Stanley Kubrick's death and the Columbine High School shootings occurred within months of each other; Ledonne credited the two events with changing his life. After seeing A Clockwork Orange, Ledonne discovered that film could comment on culture; after the Columbine shootings, he realized he was headed down the same path as the shooters. "It was a bit scary, once I learned more about these boys, because it was like I was looking in the mirror and I didn't want the same fate for myself", Ledonne said. He began taking martial arts, studying film, and saw a therapist. By the time he graduated from Alamosa High School, Ledonne had a 4.0 grade point average and was voted "most likely to succeed" by his peers. He studied film at Emerson College and moved back to Colorado to form his own production company, Emberwild Productions, which mostly edits wedding videos.

In November 2004, Ledonne discovered a program called RPG Maker, which allows a developer to add images, text, story and objectives to design a game; RPG Maker creates the necessary programming automatically. Ledonne had always conceptualized video games throughout his childhood but never produced one due to his lack of technical knowledge; with RPG Maker he was able to fulfill his ambition. Ledonne decided to make a game that would explore why the Columbine shootings occurred, as well as refuting pervasive myths about the shooters and the alleged role video games played in the massacre.

The researching, planning, design and programming of the game took about six months and between 200 and 300 hours of work. All the footage and pictures in the game were taken from the internet. Final Fantasy VI influenced the sprite-based design. Many of the songs in the game are MIDI versions of 1990s grunge and alternative bands such as Radiohead, Nirvana and the Smashing Pumpkins. Ledonne paid meticulous attention to detail, including giving players access to the exact inventory the gunmen used on their rampage. He watched videos, read newspaper articles and pored over 11,000 pages of documents released by the county government regarding the massacre and the killers.

Ledonne added elements to the game to criticize subjects varying from public reaction to the disaster, to stereotypical role-playing game conventions. Every victory in battle displays the message "another victory for the Trenchcoat Mafia", in reference to the gang that Harris and Klebold were mistakenly affiliated with by the media. Ledonne added the hell segment and populated it with characters from the video game Doom, explaining that "[having the shooters] battle these monsters in an eternal recreation of their favorite videogame was a statement in and of itself." Super Columbine Massacre is the only video game Ledonne has created, and he has no future plans to create another.

=== Release ===
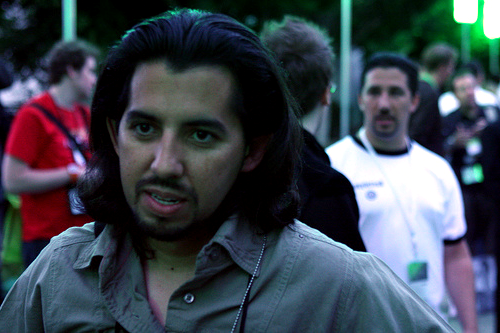
Brian Crecente, then a games writer for Rocky Mountain News, helped bring wider attention to Super Columbine Massacre.

The game was made available for download on April 20, 2005, the sixth anniversary of the Columbine massacre. Ledonne sought to remain anonymous at the game's debut to avoid any possible controversy, which he would later regret as it created the impression he had something to hide. Under the alias "Columbin", Ledonne regularly engaged gamers and critics alike on a message board he established to discuss the game's depiction of the shooting and the broader implications of the shooting. Ledonne's identity was revealed by Roger Kovacs, a friend of Rachel Scott, one of the Columbine victims. Kovacs learned of Ledonne's identity by donating to his website via PayPal; after his name and address were posted online, Ledonne stepped forward and was greeted with requests for interviews. "That's when I decided that I had to grow a backbone and stand up for my creation", Ledonne said.

The game is distributed as freeware, with donations in the amount of $1 requested to defray bandwidth costs. Initially, the game attracted little attention, and was downloaded 10,000 times in its first year. In April 2006 Patrick Dugan of web site Gamasutra wrote about the game after meeting its host at Game Developers Conference. Impressed, Dugan sent an email to Georgia Institute of Technology professor Ian Bogost, who blogged about the game. Brian Crecente of gaming news site Kotaku and the Rocky Mountain News subsequently interviewed Bogost, and the Associated Press and mainstream media picked up the story. The increased visibility resulted in increased coverage, controversy, and downloads; in the first half of May 2006 the game was downloaded more than 30,000 times. Ledonne announced in September 2006 that the game was no longer available for download directly through its website (instead providing download links), as the title's popularity cost too much to sustain; in a single day in September, he reported 8,000 downloads. By March 2007, the game had been downloaded more than 400,000 times.

== Reception ==
Reception of Super Columbine Massacre has been negative amongst the mainstream media and those personally affected by the shootings. Upon revealing Columbine's identity as Ledonne, Kovacs said "One of the girls who died [in the shootings] was a friend of mine, Rachel. We were in the same church group. Anyone playing this game can kill Rachel over and over again." The father of one victim remarked to the press that the game "disgusts me. You trivialize the actions of two murderers and the lives of the innocent." One survivor of the shooting played the game and voiced reserved support, remarking that "It probably sounds a bit odd for someone like me to say, but I appreciate the fact at least to some degree that something like this was made." While he took issue with what he saw as glamorization of the shooters, he also believed it would help open a dialogue about the shooting.

Super Columbine Massacre was largely condemned by the press. Betty Nguyen of CNN labeled the game as an example of a subculture that worships terrorists. Newspapers called the game "exploitive" and a "monstrosity". PC World declared the game #2 on its list of "The 10 Worst Games of All Time." Even critics who were supportive of Ledonne's intent found the game hard to play; Ben Kuchera of Ars Technica said that he left the game "shaken", but that as an easily misunderstood game "the people who are most likely to gain anything from it will never play it." Crecente felt that the message of the game was obscured by the cartoon graphics of the medium. Ledonne has refused to alter the game as it represents his thoughts on the subject at a particular point in time, but has encouraged others to rework the game themselves.

The most positive reviews of Super Columbine Massacre came from critics who accepted Ledonne's intended message. Wired magazine writer Clive Thompson appreciated the game's attention to narrative detail, writing that "the upshot [of the game] is that Ledonne has done a surprisingly good job of painting the emotional landscape of [the gunmen]—whipsawing from self-pity to pompous grandiosity and blinding rage, then back again." Thompson called the game subtle, including jabs at the participants and gaming culture by using the language of games as a way to think about the killings. Writing for The Courier Mail, Paul Syvret's advice to those who found the game controversial and in bad taste was to "lighten up". Bogost summed up his review of the game by writing "this game is not fun, it is challenging, and difficult to play—not technically difficult, but conceptually difficult. We need more of that." David Kociemba, a professor at Emerson College, agreed with Bogost and commented that "the controversy should be that there aren't more games like Super Columbine Massacre RPG! that are as demanding and as artistically innovative." Dugan responded to common criticisms of the game, including that the game was made in bad taste, by writing a rebuttal on his blog:

I think everyone who disses the Columbine RPG is gutless. Most haven't played the game, or have played it with such preconceptions that they're blinded to the genuis [sic], the honesty, the beauty of its social commentary. Super Columbine Massacre RPG is riddled with design flaws and has mediocre graphics by 1995, the maker of the game admits this, but it regardless is a work of art. It puts you in the mindset of the killers and provides a very clear suggestion of why they did what they did; they were enacting an ideological demonstration through a terrorist act, and the game shines light on this as an indictment of the American dream and way of life painfully close to the main nerve.

After the 2006 Dawson College shooting in September 2006, when gunman Kimveer Gill killed one student and injured 19 others, the Toronto Sun wrote that Gill had self-reported playing Columbine Massacre on a web site. The story was picked up by media and reported widely. Upon hearing media reports of a link to the game one of the shooting victims at Dawson College contacted Ledonne and told him that "I just suffered multiple gunshot wounds and I think you should take this game down." Ledonne expressed his reaction to the shooting and renewed media attention towards his game in an interview a week later:

If one is interested in making something for the public to view—be it a painting, a book, an album, a film, or a video game, should the POSSIBLE harm that may come out of this work be grounds for its suppression from society? This is, in a sense, pre-crime. If you believe in what you're doing and you want to express yourself, the expression should be primary and any interpretations that come after must always remain of secondary importance to the creation of the work itself. On another level, the entire correlation between the Dawson College shooting and my game is unfounded. [...] What else did Kimveer like? Black clothes? Goth music? Pizza? [...] If anything, the Dawson College shooting is proof positive that games like [Super Columbine Massacre] should be made; until video games are no longer among the "usual suspects" for homicidal rampages, the public needs to more carefully consider why interactive electronic media is somehow the manufacturer of Manchurian Candidates.

Developer Ryan Lambourn created a flash game called V-Tech Rampage in 2007, which allows players to control the actions of gunman Seung-Hui Cho in the Virginia Tech massacre. Lambourn professed empathy for Cho, and said that he was a target of bullying in high school. "No one listens to you unless you've got something sensational to do. And that's why I feel sympathy for Cho Seung-Hui [sic]. He had to go that far", Lambourn stated. On the V-Tech Rampage site, Lambourn posted a statement that he would take the game off of Newgrounds if donations reached $1,000; at $2,000 in donations he would take the game down from the main site and for another $1,000 he would apologize for creating it. Ledonne posted a comment on Lambourn's website after V-Tech Rampage drew comparisons to Super Columbine Massacre, calling Lambourn's statement tantamount to a "hostage note", and asking bloggers to consider "not whether a game about the Virginia Tech shooting SHOULD be made but how we might go about making a game that accomplishes more than V-Tech Rampage does with the subject matter." Ledonne stated that he emailed Lambourn sympathetically, but that the creator responded to his emails with profanity; he reiterated that the two games had different motivations and were not easily comparable in content.

=== Slamgate and legacy ===
In October 2006, Sam Roberts, the Guerilla Gamemaker Competition director of the Slamdance festival, emailed Ledonne encouraging him to submit the game to the contest. Ledonne looked at the selection of the game as one of the competition's finalists in December as evidence that "all forms of art can be valid tools for societal exploration (even painful topics like school shootings)". The event's organizer, Peter Baxter, announced the removal of the game from the festival's "Guerrilla Gamemaker Competition" after its selection as a finalist. Several reasons for the change of mind were given, including threatened sponsor withdrawal, possible lawsuits, and "moral grounds"; Baxter denied that sponsor pressure caused the drop, instead affirming that "the shootings are still a very touchy subject, and rightly so. We have to be sensitive to [victims and their families'] feelings." An additional consideration reported was that unnamed parties might sue for copyright violations in the game itself. The announcement marked the first time the festival had pulled jury-selected content from the contest; the incident was dubbed "Slamgate" by the gaming press.

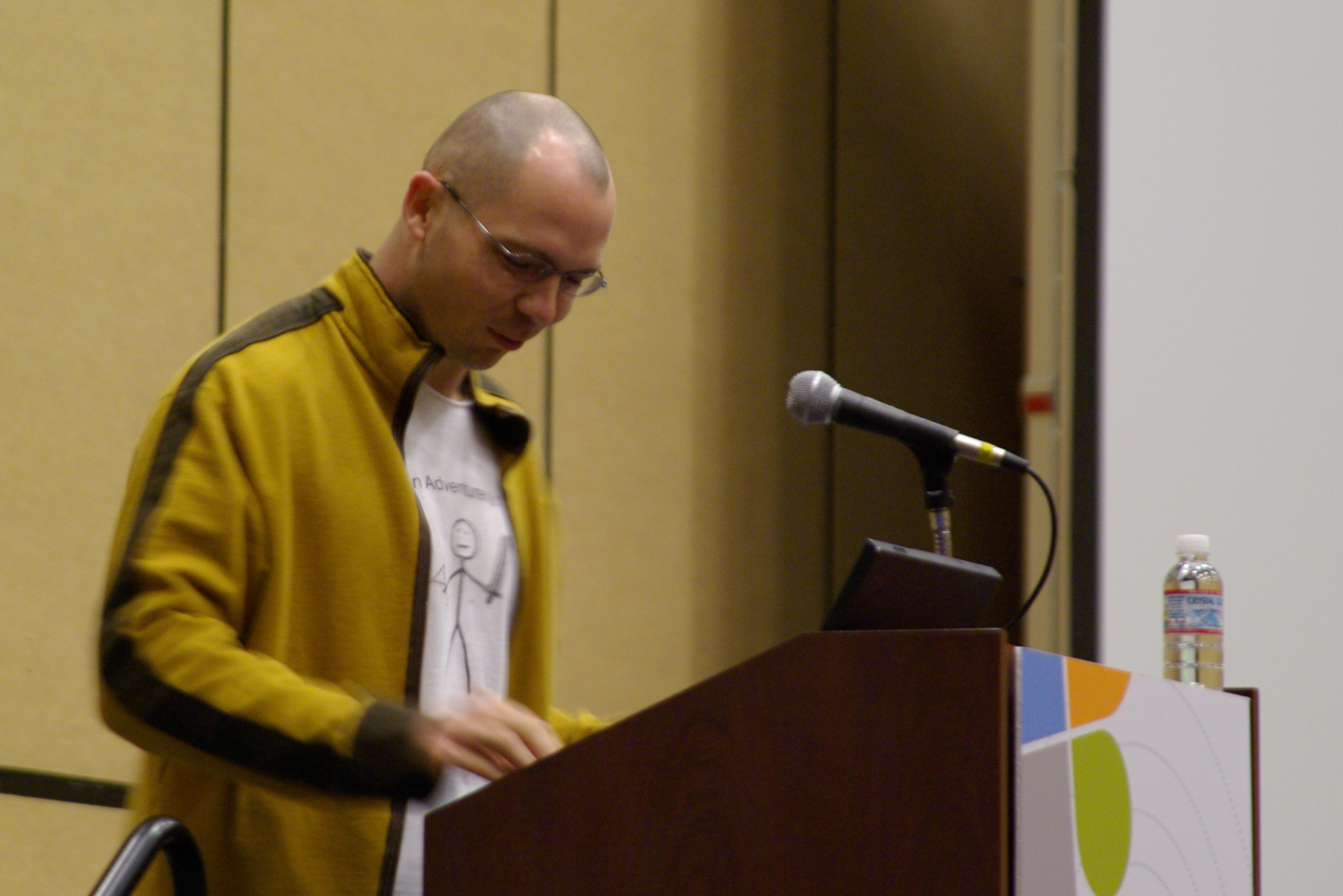
Independent game developers like Jonathan Blow defended Super Columbine Massacre RPG! after it was removed from the Slamdance competition.

Following the announcement, USC Interactive Media Division withdrew its sponsorship of the festival. Seven of the fourteen finalist games were removed from the contest by their developers in protest: Braid, flOw, Once Upon A Time, Toblo, Everyday Shooter, Book and Volume and Castle Crashers (Toblo was later reinstated by the DigiPen Institute of Technology, who owns the rights to the game). Developer Jonathan Blow of Braid stated: "[Super Columbine Massacre] lacks compassion, and I find the Artist's Statement disingenuous. But despite this, the game does have redeeming value. It does provoke important thoughts, and it does push the boundaries of what games are about. It is composed with more of an eye toward art than most games. Clearly, it belongs at the festival." Blow and the other developers sent an open letter to the festival, encouraging the reinstatement of the game as keeping with the festival's "trailblazing" efforts. Despite protests, Baxter refused to change his mind, citing consideration for the shooting's victims and their families. Ledonne told the other finalists that he planned to go to the festival anyway and distribute copies of the game. Acknowledging that the withdrawal of six finalists compromised the competition, Roberts let the attendees vote on whether any prizes would be awarded; they decided not to.

Brian Flemming, director of The God Who Wasn't There, saw Ledonne's demo of Super Columbine Massacre outside the festival, and convinced two fellow Slamdance film jurors to award the game a "Special Jury Prize" for Best Documentary, an unofficial award not endorsed by Slamdance itself. The jurors intended to present the special prize alongside the award for best documentary. Shortly before the ceremony, Baxter informed Flemming that he could not present the award due to "music clearance issues", and refused to allow it despite Flemming's protests. According to Ledonne, Flemming tried to hold his ground, but eventually gave in to Baxter's request.

Ledonne produced a documentary film based on his experiences after the release of Super Columbine Massacre. Titled Playing Columbine, the documentary uses the controversy surrounding the game to investigate the large issues facing video games as a medium for artistic expression. The film premiered at AFI Fest in Los Angeles, California on November 7, 2008.

As a result of the controversy of his game, Ledonne became an unwitting spokesman for the games industry, facing the medium's opponents in debates and forums. The furor resulting from Slamgate was called out by Ledonne and others in the media as a sign that video games had not yet outgrown the traditional stereotype of children's games. Keith Stuart of The Guardian wrote that despite being confused and tawdry, Super Columbine Massacre "symbolizes a growing understanding that videogames have more to say than 'shoot the enemies and pick up health.'" Authors Andreas Jahn-Sudmann and Ralf Stockmann consider controversial video games such as Super Columbine Massacre and the "Hot Coffee" mod of Grand Theft Auto: San Andreas evidence of sociopolitical tensions present between gamers and older generations. The game and others like it continue to be at the center of the video games as art debate, and Gamasutra credited Super Columbine Massacre and Slamgate as having two highly positive and far-reaching effects; first, forcing print game journalism to focus on the issue; and second, the "evangelization of the notion that games can be as meaningful and important as other media, even if the example is offensive to the sensibilities of most Americans [...] To win is to lose, but to play is to experience an enrichment that cannot be scored."

== See also ==
- School Shooter: North American Tour 2012
- Columbine effect
