= Entertainment Software Ass'n v. Foti =

2006 American legal case

Entertainment Software Association v. Foti
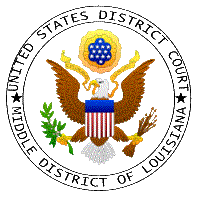
- Court: United States District Court for the Middle District of Louisiana
- Full case name: Entertainment Software Association et al. v. Charles C. Foti, Jr. et al.

Court membership
- Judge sitting: James J. Brady

Entertainment Software Association v. Foti is a lawsuit filed on June 16, 2006 claiming that a Louisiana law should be declared unconstitutional. The recently passed Louisiana law was a way for the state to censor video games by making it illegal to supply minors with video games considered violent, similar to laws making pornographic material unavailable to minors, but using violence as the criteria instead of sexual content. The lawsuit claims that the law infringed on the video game industry's constitutional right to freedom of expression.

The suit was successful in getting the law overturned in late 2006, and the plaintiffs were awarded attorney's fees in early 2007.

== Lawsuit ==
The plaintiffs in the case, the Entertainment Software Association (ESA) and the Entertainment Merchants Association (EMA), claimed that Louisiana criminal law RS 14:91.14 is unconstitutional on First and Fourteenth Amendment grounds. The defendants were Attorney General of Louisiana, Charles C. Foti, Jr., and Doug Moreau, US District Attorney of the Parish of East Baton Rouge. Louisiana Governor Kathleen Blanco had signed HB1381 just the day before as Act 441 of the 2006 Louisiana Regular Session. The law made it illegal for someone in Louisiana to sell, lease or rent a violent video game (as defined in the Act) to someone under 18 years of age.

The suit pointed out that in other states, similar laws had already been declared unconstitutional, and thus impossible to enforce. Furthermore, according to the suit, the law would have chilling results with video games being less likely to be accessible by adults (as well as by minors, as was the initial intent of the law).

== Aftermath ==
Louisiana Middle District Judge James J. Brady issued a preliminary injunction on August 24, 2006.

On July 17, 2006, Florida attorney and activist, Jack Thompson, who helped Louisiana Representative Roy Burrell author HB1381, filed an amicus curiae brief which Judge Brady denied on July 19, 2006.

The law was permanently enjoined on November 29, 2006, and the court entered final judgment on December 5, 2006.

In his April 10, 2007 ruling, Judge Brady stated that he was dumbfounded that the law even passed and was signed into law, given that similar laws were struck down in other states and those same states were forced to pay the legal fees of the plaintiffs. Judge Brady ordered the state to pay $92,000 in legal fees to the plaintiffs, ESA and EMA.

Representative Roy Burrell stated that he may pursue such legislation again in the future.
