= National Institute on Media and the Family =

- Formation: 1996
- Founder: David Walsh
- Dissolved: 2009
- Type: Nonprofit organization
- Purpose: Advocacy group, monitor mass media
- Headquarters: Minneapolis, Minnesota, United States
- Official language: English

The National Institute on Media and the Family (NIMF), founded by psychologist David Walsh in 1996, was a nonprofit organization based in Minneapolis, Minnesota. It was a nonsectarian advocacy group which sought to monitor mass media for content that it deemed is harmful to children and families. The group characterized itself as "an international resource center for cutting-edge research and information" and denied playing any role in media censorship.

Among the NIMF's focuses were violence and video games, the social impact of television, and closer to its shutdown in 2009, video game addiction.

== Operations ==
The National Institute on Media and the Family was a nonprofit organization based in Minneapolis, Minnesota. It was founded in 1996 by psychologist David Walsh, who served as its president, with a focus on the effects of media on children and family. It operated until its closure in 2009.

The MediaWise movement is the publicity and community outreach arm of the NIMF. Through it the organization sponsored speaking engagements given by its staff throughout the country, although most events took place at educational and religious institutions in Minnesota. David Walsh was notable as the spokesperson for the NIMF, having given numerous interviews to national news programs and newspapers in this capacity.

=== Video Game Report Cards ===
The primary publication of the MediaWise movement was an annual report on the marketing, distribution, and impact of video games to minors. This "Video Game Report Card" comprises results to national surveys, summaries of recently completed research projects, and a grade-based assessment of the Entertainment Software Association's efforts to regulate the sales of video games to minors.

The 2005 MediaWise Video Game Report Card criticized the Entertainment Software Rating Board (ESRB) for its system of rating video games for age-appropriate conduct, giving the ESRB a failing "F" mark for inaccurate game ratings. Several days after the report was released, the United States National Parent Teacher Association issued a press release condemning it, stating that "[the report card] contained erroneous statements about National PTA's position on the Entertainment Software Rating Board's (ESRB) rating system. In fact, National PTA does not endorse NIMF's report. Further, it does not agree with the report's characterization of ESRB and its rating system." On December 6, 2005, the ESRB assigned a failing grade of "F" to NIMF for its Video Game Report Card released the previous week. It cited inaccuracies, incomplete and misleading statements, omission of material facts, and flawed research as key factors in assigning the failing grade, and claimed the organization was elevating its political and media agenda over their stated concerns for consumer welfare, particularly those of children and teenagers.

== Positions ==
=== Violence and video games ===
In late 2003 Walsh proposed the coining of a neologism to fill what he sees is a gap in English vocabulary: killographic, to be defined as the "graphic depiction of brutal violence." This is intended as an analogy to "pornographic", which he defines as the "graphic depiction of sexual acts". This term has been the subject of public debate. Doug Lowenstein, head of the Entertainment Software Association, described it as a "clever phrase", but noted that the average age of video gamers is 28, and that "as adults they should be allowed to pick their entertainment."

In late 2005, the NIMF sent a letter to activist Jack Thompson, who had also advocated against violent content in video games, to request that Thompson stop claiming to have the support of the group in various open letters he had published in earlier months. Stubbs the Zombie in Rebel Without a Pulse and F.E.A.R., both released in late 2005, encountered controversy after NIMF listed them in their "games to avoid" report because the organization had found they featured cannibalism in certain scenes. Walsh and U.S. Senator Joe Lieberman criticized the game as harmful to underage children, with Lieberman stating at a NIMF press conference that "It's just the worst kind of message to kids" and "They can be dangerous to your children's health." The game's developer, Wideload Games, responded by saying that Stubbs is a zombie, not a human cannibal. GamePolitics also chided the report, calling it "ridiculous" and citing 36 mainstream news outlets had picked the story immediately after the NIMF report.

=== Social impact of television ===
Deseret News reported in 1997 on Walsh's assertion that the negative impact of television consumption by children is understated by people, as it had created a "culture of disrespect". Walsh maintained that censorship would not be a correct solution to the issue.
