= Jason Della Rocca =

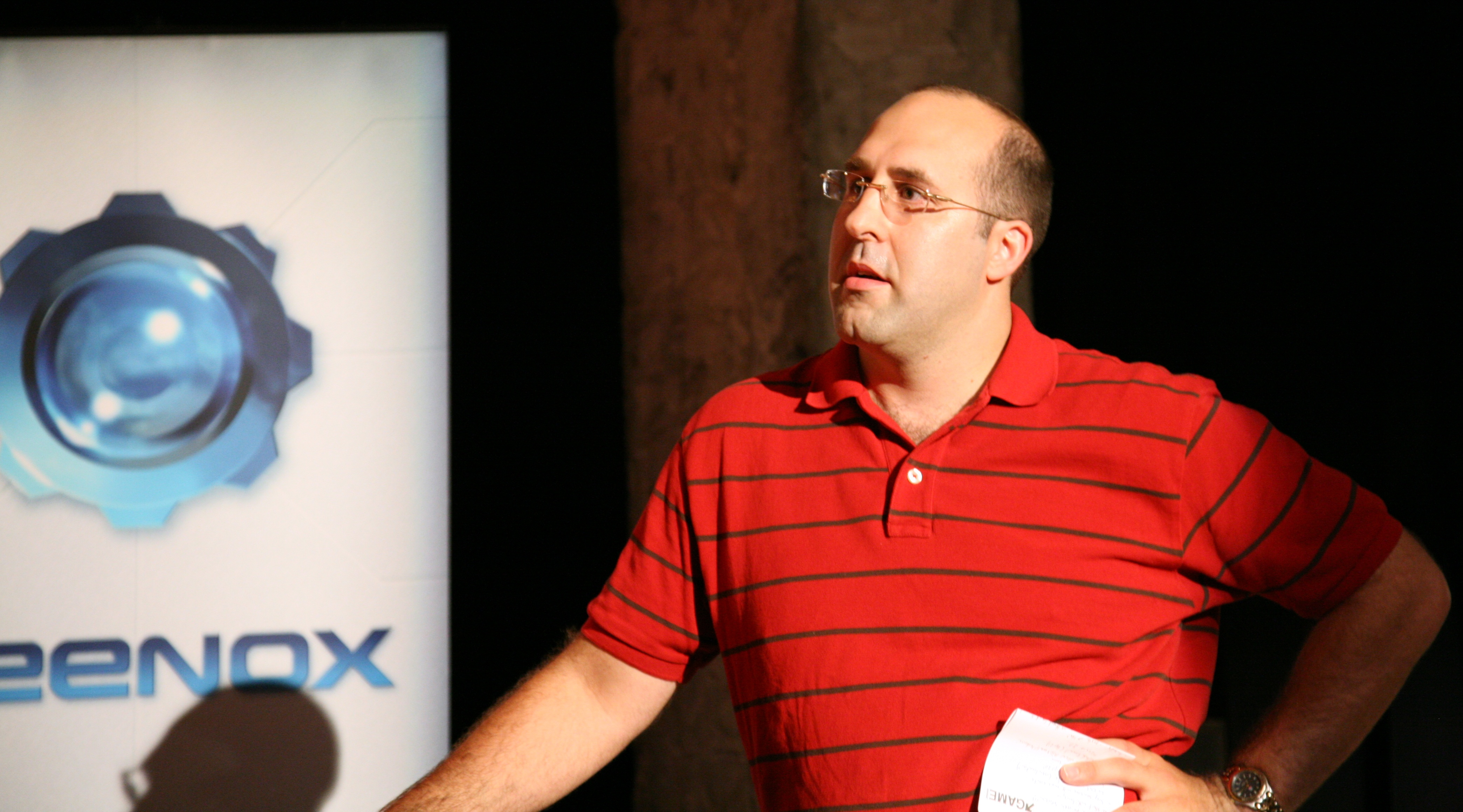
- Born: January 23, 1974 (age 52); Montreal, Quebec, Canada
- Occupations: co-founder at Execution Labs, former executive director

Jason Della Rocca (born 1974) is the former executive director of the Montreal chapter of the International Game Developers Association (IGDA): Della Rocca supervised the daily operations, outreach initiatives, and membership programs of the organization from September 2000 to March 2009. After leaving the IGDA following his 9-year involvement with the company, Della Rocca founded Perimeter Partners, a consultancy that provides strategic level guidance and expertise to companies and organizations in, and around, the game industry globally. More recently, Della Rocca cofounded a hybrid incubator/accelerator for independent mobile game startups called Execution Labs. In the summer of 2013 he was appointed to the advisory board for the ICT practice of Foreign Affairs, Trade and Development, Canada's foreign and trade ministry.

Della Rocca is a well-known figure within the game development community and was honored for his industry building efforts with the inaugural Ambassador Award at the 8th annual Game Developers Choice Awards. Della Rocca was also named to Game Developer Magazine's 2009 "The Game Developer 50", a list which profiles 50 of the most important contributors to the current state of the game industry.

Della Rocca used the phrase "massacre chaser" in response to an inquiry from MSNBC reporter Winda Benedetti discussing Jack Thompson's quick blaming of video games as the root of the Virginia Tech massacre.

== Appearances ==
- Documentary Movie Interview: Playing Columbine 2008
- Documentary Movie Interview: Moral Kombat 2007
- CTV Interview: 2006 Dawson College shooting (15 September 2006)
- Panel Discussion: Video Games: Content and Responsibility (2 August 2006)
- Panel Discussion: Murder, Sex and Censorship: Debating the Morals of Creative Freedom (23 March 2006)
- Panel Discussion: Got (Too Much) Game? (18 August 2005)
