= David Walsh (psychologist) =

- Born: United States
- Occupations: Psychologist; educator

David Walsh is an American psychologist, educator, and author. He served as the president and founder of the National Institute on Media and the Family, based in Minneapolis, until it was closed in 2009.

== Early life and education ==
Walsh received his Ph.D. in psychology from the University of Minnesota, where he is currently on the faculty.

== Professional life ==
In 2010, he and his wife, Monica, and daughter, Erin, launched Mind Positive Parenting. David is also a consultant to the World Health Organization. Walsh is a public speaker and does presentations focused on brain development, adolescence, media on children and the factors that influence school performance.

== Awards and recognition ==
He has been the recipient of many awards, including the 1999 "Friend of the Family Award" presented by the Minnesota Council on Family Relations.

Walsh has appeared on such television programs as 60 Minutes, Dateline NBC, The Early Show, NewsHour with Jim Lehrer, Good Morning America, The Today Show, the Jane Pauley Show and National Public Radio's All Things Considered. His work has been covered in major outlets, such as The New York Times, The Wall Street Journal, The Washington Post, Los Angeles Times, Time, Reader's Digest, and others. He has been featured on PBS. He appeared in Spencer Halpin's Moral Kombat, a documentary on violence in video games.

== Bibliography ==
- Smart Parenting, Smarter Kids: The One Brain Book You Need to Help Your Child Grow Brighter, Healthier, and Happier (2012)
- No, Why Kids - of All Ages - Need to Hear It and Ways Parents Can Say It (2007)
- Why Do They Act That Way? A Survival Guide to the Adolescent Brain for You and Your Teen (2004)
