= Jack Thompson (activist) =

American activist and disbarred attorney (born 1951)

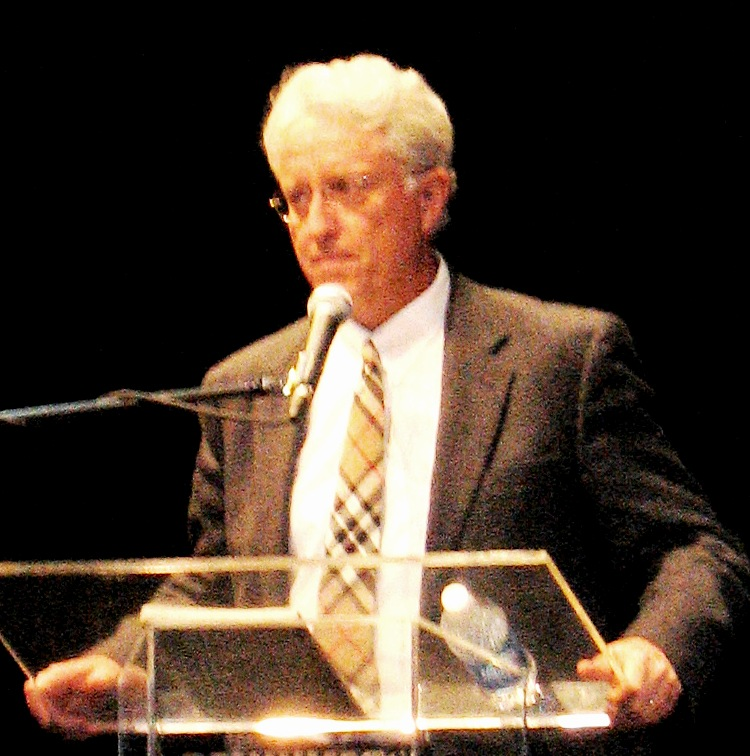
- Thompson in 2007
- Born: John Bruce Thompson; July 25, 1951 (age 75); Cleveland, Ohio, U.S.
- Education: Vanderbilt University
- Occupations: Activist; Attorney (formerly, disbarred)
- Political party: Democratic; Republican (formerly)
- Spouse: Patricia Thompson

John Bruce Thompson (born July 25, 1951) is an American activist and disbarred attorney. As an attorney, Thompson focused his legal efforts against what he perceives as obscenity in modern culture. He gained notoriety as an anti-video game activist, criticizing the content of games and their alleged effects on children. He also targeted radio personality Howard Stern and rap music.

Thompson grew up in Cleveland, Ohio, and attended Vanderbilt University Law School. He became nationally known for targeting rap music in the 1990s, particularly 2 Live Crew, N.W.A, and Ice-T. He later shifted towards criticizing video games, campaigning against their producers and distributors. Thompson has alleged that video games had negative effects on children. He is mostly known for his actions against Rockstar Games and the Grand Theft Auto franchise. He has lobbied against nudity in video games and has supported banning sales of violent and sexually explicit games to minors.

Thompson's legal career was further recognized for his actions against the Florida Bar, including challenging its constitutionality in 1993. In 2008, he was permanently disbarred by the Supreme Court of Florida for inappropriate conduct, including making false statements to tribunals and disparaging and humiliating litigants. After his disbarment, he became a teacher.

== Early life and career ==
John Bruce Thompson was born on July 25, 1951. He grew up in Cleveland, Ohio and attended Cuyahoga Falls High School. He received media attention when he hosted his own political talk show on the college radio station. He then attended Vanderbilt University Law School, where he met his wife, Patricia. In 1976, they moved to Florida, where Thompson, working as a lawyer and then a fund-raiser for a Christian ministry, began attending the Key Biscayne Presbyterian Church and became a born-again Christian. Thompson admits to having a "colorful disciplinary history" as an attorney.

In 1988, Thompson became involved in a feud with WIOD radio host Neil Rogers, after Thompson was instrumental in persuading the Federal Communications Commission (FCC) to fine WIOD $10,000 for airing such parody songs as "Boys Want Sex in the Morning" on Rogers' show. Thompson also sued the station for violating a December 1987 agreement to end on-air harassment against him. For the next eight months, Thompson recorded all of Rogers' broadcasts and documented 40,000 mentionings of his name. Thompson claimed that one of the terms of his agreement with the station was that the station would pay him $5,000 each time his name was mentioned, totaling $200 million in the suit.

Thompson first met Janet Reno in November 1975, when he applied for a job as an assistant state's attorney in Dade County, Florida, but was not hired. In 1988, he ran for prosecutor against then-incumbent Dade County State Attorney Reno, after she had declined his request to prosecute Neil Rogers. Thompson gave Reno a letter at a campaign event requesting that she check a box to indicate whether she was homosexual, bisexual, or heterosexual. Thompson said that Reno then put her hand on his shoulder and responded, "I'm only interested in virile men. That's why I'm not attracted to you." He filed a police report accusing her of battery for touching him. In response, Reno asked Florida governor Bob Martinez to appoint a special prosecutor to investigate. The special prosecutor rejected the charge, concluding that it was "a political ploy". Reno was ultimately re-elected with 69% of the popular vote. Thompson repeated allegations that Reno was a lesbian when she was nominated as U.S. Attorney General, leading one of her supporters, lieutenant governor Buddy MacKay, to dismiss him as a "kook".

In 1990, after his election loss, Thompson began a campaign against the efforts of Switchboard of Miami, a social services group of which Reno was a board member. Thompson charged that the group placed "homosexual-education tapes" in public schools. Switchboard responded by getting the Supreme Court of Florida to order that he submit to a psychiatric examination. Thompson did so and passed. Thompson has since stated that he is "the only officially certified sane lawyer in the entire state of Florida".

== Rap music ==
=== 2 Live Crew ===
Thompson came to national prominence in the controversy over 2 Live Crew's As Nasty As They Wanna Be album. (Note: Luke Skyywalker Records, the company of 2 Live Crew's Luther Campbell, had previously released a record supporting Reno in her race against Thompson.) On January 1, 1990, he wrote to Martinez and Reno asking them to investigate whether the album violated Florida obscenity laws. Although the state prosecutor declined to proceed with an investigation, Thompson pushed local officials in various parts of the state to block sales of the album, along with N.W.A's Straight Outta Compton. In sending documents to opponents, Thompson frequently attached a photocopy of his driver's license, with a photo of Batman pasted over his own. Thompson said, "I have sent my opponents pictures of Batman to remind them I'm playing the role of Batman. Just like Bruce Wayne helped the police in the movie, I have had to assist the sheriff of Broward County." He also wore a Batman wristwatch. Thompson compared Campbell to the Joker. He also said, "I understand as well as anybody that the First Amendment is a cornerstone of a free society—but there is a responsibility to people who can be harmed by words and thoughts, one of which is the message from Campbell that women can be sexually abused."

Thompson took issue with another 2 Live Crew song, "Banned in the U.S.A.", and he sent a letter to Jon Landau, manager of Bruce Springsteen, whose song "Born in the U.S.A." was to be sampled by the group. Thompson suggested that Landau "protect 'Born in the U.S.A.' from its apparent theft by a bunch of clowns who traffic toxic waste to kids", or else Thompson would "be telling the nation about Mr. Springsteen's tacit approval" of the song, which, according to Campbell, "expresses anger about the failure of the First Amendment to protect 2 Live Crew from prosecution". Thompson also compared the album to school shooting. The members of 2 Live Crew responded to these efforts by suing the Broward County sheriff in federal district court. The court ruled that the album was in fact obscene. However, an appellate court reversed the obscenity ruling, because simply playing the tape was insufficient evidence of the constitutional requirement that it had no artistic value.

Thompson said of his campaign, "I won't stop till I get the head of a record company or record chain in jail. Only then will they stop trafficking in obscenity". Bob Guccione Jr., founder of Spin magazine, responded by calling Thompson "a sort of latter-day Don Quixote, as equally at odds with his times as that mythical character was," and argued that his campaign was achieving "two things...: pissing everybody off and compounding his own celebrity".

=== Other targets ===
Thompson wrote another letter in 1991, this time to the Minnesota attorney general Skip Humphrey, complaining about the N.W.A album Niggaz4Life. Humphrey warned locally-based Musicland that sales of the album might violate state law against distribution of sexually explicit material harmful to minors. Humphrey also referred the matter to the Minneapolis city attorney, who concluded that some of the songs might fit the legal definition if issued as singles, but that sales of the album as a whole were not prosecutable. Thompson also initiated a similar campaign in Boston. Later, Thompson criticized the Republican Party for inviting N.W.A member and party donor Eric "Eazy-E" Wright to an exclusive function.

In 1992, Thompson was hired by the Freedom Alliance, a self-described patriot group founded by Oliver North, described as far-right by The Washington Post. By this time, Thompson was looking to have Time Warner, then being criticized for promoting the Ice-T song "Cop Killer", prosecuted for federal and state crimes such as sedition, incitement to riot, and "advocating overthrow of government" by distributing material that, in Thompson's view, advocated the killing of police officers. Time Warner eventually released Ice-T and his band from their contract, and voluntarily suspended distribution of the album on which "Cop Killer" was featured.

Thompson's push to label various musical performances obscene was not entirely limited to rap. In addition to taking on 2 Live Crew, Thompson campaigned against sales of the racy music video for Madonna's "Justify My Love". Then in 1996, he took on MTV broadcasts for "objectification of women" by writing to the station's corporate parent, Viacom, demanding a stop to what he called "corporate pollution". He also went after MTV's advertisers and urged the United States Army to pull recruiting commercials, citing the Army's recruitment of women and problems with sexual harassment scandals.

== Video games ==
Thompson has heavily criticized a number of video games and campaigned against their producers and distributors. His basic argument is that violent video games have repeatedly been used by teenagers as "murder simulators" to rehearse violent plans. He has pointed to alleged connections between such games and a number of school massacres. According to Thompson, "In every school shooting, we find that kids who pull the trigger are video gamers." Also, he claims that scientific studies show teenagers process the game environment differently from adults, leading to increased violence and copycat behavior. Thompson has described the proliferation of games by Sony, a Japanese company, as "Pearl Harbor 2".

Thompson has rejected arguments that such video games are protected by freedom of expression, saying, "Murder simulators are not constitutionally protected speech. They're not even speech. They're dangerous physical appliances that teach a kid how to kill efficiently and to love it," as well as simply calling video games "mental masturbation". In addition, he has attributed part of the impetus for violent games to the military, saying that it was looking "for a way to disconnect in the soldier's mind the physical act of pulling the trigger from the awful reality that a life may end". Thompson further claims that some of these games are based on military training and simulation technologies, such as those being developed at the Institute for Creative Technologies, which, he suggests, were created by the Department of Defense to help overcome soldiers' inhibition to kill. He also claims that the PlayStation 2's DualShock controller "gives you a pleasurable buzz back into your hands with each kill. This is operant conditioning, behavior modification right out of B. F. Skinner's laboratory."

Although his efforts dealing with video games have generally focused on juveniles, Thompson got involved in a case involving an adult on one occasion in 2004. This was an aggravated murder case against 29-year-old Charles McCoy Jr., the defendant in a series of highway shootings the previous year around Columbus, Ohio. When McCoy was captured, a game console and a copy of The Getaway were in his motel room. Although not representing McCoy and over the objections of McCoy's lawyers, Thompson succeeded in getting the court to unseal a search warrant for McCoy's residence. This showed, among other things, the discovery of additional games State of Emergency, Max Payne, and Dead to Rights. However, he was not allowed to present the evidence to McCoy, whose defense team was relying on an insanity defense based on paranoid schizophrenia. In Thompson's estimation, McCoy was the "functional equivalent of a 15-year-old," and "the only thing insane about this case is the (insanity) defense".

In 2024, years after his disbarment from practicing law, as well as his notoriety with gamers fading with the passage of time, Jack Thompson had appeared to have denounced his disdain for video games. On an interview with the My Perfect Console podcast, Thompson praised video games for helping out disabled people with their interactive nature.

=== Early litigation ===
Thompson filed a lawsuit on behalf of the parents of three students killed in the 1997 Heath High School shooting. Investigations showed that the perpetrator, 14-year-old Michael Carneal, had regularly played various computer games (including Doom, Quake, Castle Wolfenstein, Redneck Rampage, Nightmare Creatures, MechWarrior, and Resident Evil) and accessed some pornographic websites. Carneal had also owned a videotape of The Basketball Diaries, which includes a high school student dreaming about shooting his teacher and some classmates. The suit sought $33 million in damages, alleging that the producers of the games, the movie, and the operators of the Internet sites were negligent in distributing this material to a minor because it would desensitize him and make him more prone to violence. Additional claims included product liability for making "defective" products (the defects alleged were violent features and lack of warnings) and violation of RICO, the Racketeer Influenced and Corrupt Organizations Act, for distributing this material to minors. Said Thompson, "We intend to hurt Hollywood. We intend to hurt the video game industry. We intend to hurt the sex porn sites."

The suit was filed in federal district court and was dismissed for failing to present a legally recognizable claim. The court concluded that Carneal's actions were not reasonably foreseeable by the defendants and that, in any case, his actions superseded those of the defendants, so the latter could not therefore be the proximate cause of the harm. In addition, the judge determined that "thoughts, ideas and images" in the defendants' materials did not constitute "products" that could be considered defective. The ruling was upheld on appeal.

=== Grand Theft Auto ===
==== Actions in law ====
===== Ohio =====
In February 2003, Thompson asked permission to file an amicus curiae (or "friend of the court") brief in the Ohio case of Dustin Lynch, 16, who was charged with aggravated murder in the death of JoLynn Mishne; Lynch was "obsessed" with Grand Theft Auto III. When Judge John Lohn ruled that Lynch would be tried as an adult, Thompson passed a message from Mishne's father to the judge, asserting that "the attorneys had better tell the jury about the violent video game that trained this kid [and] showed him how to kill our daughter, JoLynn. If they don't, I will."

In a motion sent to the prosecutor, the boy's court-appointed lawyer, and reporters, Thompson asked to be recognized as the boy's lawyer in the case. Medina County Prosecutor Dean Holman, however, said Thompson would be faced with deeply conflicting interests if he were to represent Dustin Lynch because he also advised Mishne's parents. Claiming that delays had weakened his case, Thompson asked Medina County Common Pleas Judge Christopher Collier to disqualify himself from presiding over the case because the judge had not ruled on Thompson's request for two months. The boy himself eventually rejected Thompson's offer, withdrawing his insanity plea. Lynch's mother, Jerrilyn Thomas, who had demanded that Collier appoint Thompson to defend her son, said she changed her mind after visiting with her son in jail, saying that the charge against him "has nothing to do with video games or Paxil, and my son's no murderer."

===== Tennessee =====
Thompson returned to file a lawsuit in Tennessee state court in October 2003 on behalf of the victims of two teenage stepbrothers who had pleaded guilty to reckless homicide, endangerment, and assault. Since the boys told investigators they were inspired by Grand Theft Auto III, Thompson sought $246 million in damages from the publisher, Take-Two Interactive, along with PlayStation 2 maker Sony Computer Entertainment America and retailer Wal-Mart. The suit charged that the defendants knew or should have known that the game would cause copycat violence. On October 22, 2003, the case was removed to the U.S. District Court for the Eastern District of Tennessee. Two days later, the plaintiffs filed a notice of voluntary dismissal, and the case was closed.

===== Alabama =====
Thompson was involved in a similar suit in Alabama in 2005 on behalf of the families of police personnel killed by Devin Moore, a teenager who was reportedly a compulsive Grand Theft Auto player. The lawyer's participation in the case, however, ran into a dispute over his pro hac vice, or temporary, admission to practice in that state. The opposing attorneys sought removal of the privilege by arguing that Thompson's conduct was unethical and claiming that he had threatened and harassed them in letters and emails. The judge added that Thompson had violated his gag order during Moore's criminal trial. Thompson tried to withdraw from the case, but his request was denied by the judge, who went ahead and revoked Thompson's temporary admission to the state bar.

For his part, Thompson said he thought the judge was trying to protect Moore's criminal conviction at any cost. He also complained about the judge's ethics, saying a local attorney who claimed to have influence on the judge had assured him the case would be dismissed unless the attorney was on Thompson's team, and also claimed that Rockstar Entertainment and Take Two Interactive posted slanderous comments about him on their website. In the aftermath of this lawsuit, Thompson lobbied Alabama attorney general Troy King to file a civil suit and call on retailers not to sell "cop-killing games".

===== Florida =====
Thompson once reported that he had videotaped a Miami Best Buy employee selling a copy of Grand Theft Auto: Vice City to his son who was 10 at the time. In a letter to Best Buy, he wrote, "Prosecutions and public relations consequences should fall on your Minneapolis headquarters like snowflakes." In January 2005, Best Buy agreed that it would enforce an existing policy to check the identification of anyone who appeared to be 17 or under and tried to purchase games rated "M" (for mature audiences).

===== New Mexico =====
In September 2006, Thompson and attorney Steven Sanders filed a suit in Albuquerque, New Mexico, against Sony, Take-Two, Rockstar Games, and teenage killer Cody Posey, for the wrongful death of three members of Posey's family. The suit, on behalf of surviving family members, claimed that "obsessively" playing Grand Theft Auto: Vice City made violence "pleasurable and attractive," disconnected violence from consequences, and caused Posey to "act out, copycat, replicate and emulate the violence" when in July 2004 he shot and killed his father, stepmother, and stepsister and then buried them under a manure pile. According to Thompson, "Posey essentially practiced how to kill on this game. If it wasn't for Grand Theft Auto, three people might not now be dead."

The suit claimed that Thompson had been told by a sheriff's deputy that the game and a Sony PlayStation 2 were found at the ranch. The suit also claimed that the game taught Posey "how to point and shoot a gun in a fashion making him an extraordinarily effective killer without teaching him any of the constraints or responsibilities needed to inhibit such a killing capacity." The game in question does not actually teach the player anything about handling a firearm. Gary Mitchell, Posey's attorney, said Thompson contacted him "numerous times" before the trial, urging him to highlight the game in Posey's defense, but Mitchell said he "just didn't find it had any merit whatsoever."

==== Take-Two reaction ====
On March 14, 2007, Take-Two filed a lawsuit seeking to permanently enjoin Thompson from filing any public nuisance action against the company that would block the sales to minors of the unreleased video games Grand Theft Auto IV and Manhunt 2. The suit alleged that Thompson's lawsuits violated the company's First Amendment rights. Responding, Thompson said: "I have been praying, literally, that Take-Two and its lawyers would do something so stupid, so arrogant, so dumb, even dumber than what they have to date done, that such a misstep would enable me to destroy Take-Two."

One analyst said that the settlement was likely to mute his public pronouncements and lawsuits against the company. However, upon the game's 2008 release, Thompson called Grand Theft Auto IV "the gravest assault upon children in this country since polio," and asked Minnesota Governor Tim Pawlenty to "pursue and file criminal charges against [Minnesota-based retailers] Target and Best Buy". He also sent a letter to Take-Two chairman Strauss Zelnick's attorney, addressed to Zelnick's mother, in which Thompson accused her son of "doing everything he possibly can to sell as many copies of GTA: IV to teen boys in the United States, a country in which your son claims you raised him to be a 'a Boy Scout'. ... More like the Hitler Youth, I would say." On May 1, 2008, Thompson appeared on the CNN Headline News program Glenn Beck, asserting that the game's sexual content made its sale to minors illegal, and that he was working with law enforcement to have criminal prosecutions brought.

==== GameZone emails ====
In September 2013, Thompson expressed his hatred of Grand Theft Auto V during a series of e-mails exchange with GameZone writer Lance Liebl during its launch week. The game happened to launch the day after the Washington Navy Yard shooting. Traditional media outlets such as Fox News and MSNBC sought out to find proof that violent video games, such as Grand Theft Auto V, had a role in the brutal killings. GameZone responded by writing an article that disagrees with this. These caught Thompson's attention, who then sent an e-mail to the site. "Look, Lance," he wrote in an email, "The American Psychological Association has established a causal link between these games and increased aggression. The Dept. of Defense uses them for that purpose." Liebl responded by offering Thompson a chance to come on the site and explain his stance, which he refused, describing gamers as "too brain-impaired to get it".

==== Criticism of Miami marketing campaign for Grand Theft Auto VI ====
In an interview with PC Gamer published on October 7th 2026, Thompson criticized Rockstars partnership with the city of Miami to advertise the upcoming release of Grand Theft Auto VI, calling the campaign "government promotion of commercial interest" and comparing it to fascism.

=== Bully ===
Beginning in 2005, Thompson supported a campaign to discourage Take-Two's subsidiary, Rockstar Games, from releasing a game called Bully, in which, according to Thompson, "what you are in effect doing is rehearsing your physical revenge and violence against those whom you have been victimized by. And then you, like Klebold and Harris in Columbine, become the ultimate bully." According to Thompson, the game "shows you how to—by bullying—take over your school. You punch people; you hit them with sling shots; you dunk their heads in dirty toilets. There's white-on-black crime in the game. You bludgeon teachers and classmates with bats. It's absolutely nuts." Thompson sued Wal-Mart, Best Buy, Target, Circuit City, GameStop, and Toys 'R' Us, seeking an order to bar the game's release. Thompson said he hoped that the pressure would get retailers to refuse to carry the game. In March 2006, the Miami-Dade County Public Schools board unanimously passed a resolution criticizing the game and urging retailers not to sell the game to minors.

Thompson also criticized Bill Gates and Microsoft for contracting with Rockstar Games to release the game on the Xbox. The Xbox version has since been cancelled for undisclosed reasons, but a version was released years later on the Xbox 360. In August 2006, Thompson requested a congressional subpoena for an early copy, threatening to file suit in Miami if he did not gain help from U.S. Rep. Cliff Stearns. Once the game is out, according to Thompson, "the horse will be out of the barn and it will be too late to do anything about it". Thompson argued that it violated Florida's public nuisance laws, which prohibit activities that can injure the health of the community.

Rockstar Games co-founder Terry Donovan responded, saying "I would prefer it if we could simply make great games and not have to deal with misunderstanding and misperception of what we do." After receiving no response from Rockstar regarding an advance copy, Thompson filed the public nuisance complaint against Wal-Mart, Take-Two Interactive, and GameStop, demanding that he be allowed to preview the game before its October 17 release date. Take-Two offered to bring in a copy and let both Judge Ronald Friedman and Thompson view the game in the judge's chambers on October 12, 2006. The judge ultimately saw no reason to restrict sales and dismissed the complaint the next day.

Thompson was critical of the judge's decision, telling the judge "You did not see the game... You don't even know what it was you saw," as well as accusing the Take-Two employee who demonstrated the game of avoiding the most violent parts. Blank Rome subsequently filed a motion to have Thompson's behavior declared "contempt for the court". Judge Friedman then recused himself from ruling, and instead filed a complaint against Thompson with the Florida Bar, calling Thompson's behavior "inappropriate by a member of the bar, unprofessional and contemptible".

Thompson later drew attention to the game's main character, a 15-year-old male, being able to kiss other boys. Thompson wrote to ESRB president Patricia Vance, "We just found gay sexual content in Bully as Jimmy Hopkins makes out with another male student. Good luck with your Teen rating now." The ESRB responded by saying they were already aware that the content was in the game when they rated it.

=== Manhunt ===
During the aftermath of the murder of Stefan Pakeerah by his friend Warren Leblanc in Leicestershire, England, the game Manhunt was linked after the media wrongfully claimed police found a copy in Leblanc's room. The police officially denied any link, citing drug-related robbery as the motive and revealing that the game had been found in Pakeerah's bedroom, not Leblanc's. Thompson, who had heard of the murder, claimed that he had written to Rockstar after the game was released, warning them that the nature of the game could inspire copycat killings: "I wrote warning them that somebody was going to copycat the Manhunt game and kill somebody. We have had dozens of killings in the U.S. by children who had played these types of games. This is not an isolated incident. These types of games are basically murder simulators. There are people being killed over here almost on a daily basis." Soon thereafter, the Pakeerah family hired Thompson with the aim of suing Sony and Rockstar for £50 million in a wrongful death claim.

Jack Thompson would later vow to permanently ban the game during the release of the sequel Manhunt 2. Thompson said he planned to sue Take-Two/Rockstar in an effort to have both Manhunt 2 and Grand Theft Auto IV banned as "public nuisances", saying "killings have been specifically linked to Take-Two's Manhunt and Grand Theft Auto games. [I have] asked Take-Two and retailers to stop selling Take-Two's 'Mature' murder simulation games to kids. They all refuse. They are about to be told by a court of law that they must adhere to the logic of their own 'Mature' labels."

=== Mortal Kombat ===
In October 2006, Thompson sent a letter to Midway Games, demanding they cease and desist selling the latest game in the Mortal Kombat series, Mortal Kombat: Armageddon, claiming that the game was illegally profiting on his likeness, because gamers could use the character creation option to make a character who looked like Thompson.

=== Activism and lobbying ===
Thompson and Eugene F. Provenzo believe that first-person shooter games provide children with "efficient killing skills".

In addition to filing lawsuits, Thompson has pushed for measures against similar games in a variety of public settings. He wrote a joint article in the Christian Science Monitor with Eugene F. Provenzo, a University of Miami professor who studies the effects of video games on children. Originally brought together to provide opposing viewpoints on 60 Minutes in the aftermath of the Columbine High School massacre, they said they had become friends and were collaborating on a book. They described themselves as having "a shared belief that first-person shooter video games are bad for our children, teaching them to act aggressively and providing them with efficient killing skills and romanticized and trivialized scenarios for killing in the real world".

Thompson has supported legislation in a number of states that would ban sales of violent and sexually explicit video games to minors. In response to First Amendment concerns, he argued that the games were a "public safety hazard". However, he rejected as "completely unconstitutional" Hillary Clinton's proposed legislation to ban sales to minors of games rated "M" for Mature by the Entertainment Software Rating Board. Thompson contended that the government could not enforce a private-sector standard but had to depend on a Miller obscenity test. He charged that Clinton was simply positioning herself politically, with the support of the gaming industry, by proposing a bill which he felt she knew would be unconstitutional.

In July 2005, Thompson sent a letter to several politicians urging them to investigate The Sims 2, alleging that the game contained nudity accessible by entering special codes. Thompson called the nudity inappropriate for a game rated "T" for Teen, a rating which indicates suitability for anyone 13 and older. Manufacturer Electronic Arts dismissed the allegations, with vice president Jeff Brown explaining that game characters have "no anatomical detail" under their clothes, effectively resembling Barbie dolls. Although the game does display blurred-out patches over body regions when characters are naked, such as when taking a shower, Brown said that was for "humorous effect" and denied there was anything improper about the game.

In Louisiana, Thompson helped draft a 2006 bill sponsored by state representative Roy Burrell to ban the sale of violent video games to buyers under 18 (HB1381). In an effort to avoid constitutional problems, it avoided trying to define "violent" and instead adopted a variation of the Miller obscenity test: sales to minors would be illegal based on community standards if the game appealed to "the minor's morbid interest in violence", was patently offensive based on adult standards of suitability for minors, and lacked serious literary, artistic, political, or scientific value for minors. The bill was passed unanimously by the state House and approved by the Senate Judiciary A Committee, despite industry opposition and predictions that it too would be unconstitutional. The Shreveport Times editorialized that Thompson's support of the bill "should immediately set off alarms" and described Thompson as someone who "thrives on chasing cultural ambulances". However, the ESA filed suit under Entertainment Software Association v. Foti, and U.S. District Judge James Brady issued a preliminary injunction, temporarily blocking the law from taking effect until full judicial review can be done. The law was permanently enjoined in late November 2006, and the state was ordered to pay the legal fees of the plaintiffs. Judge Brady was "dumbfounded" that state legislators and Louisiana Governor Kathleen Blanco wasted taxpayer money by trying to enact the law.

At one point, Thompson was asked by the National Institute on Media and the Family to stop invoking the organization's name in his campaigns. NIMF president David Walsh felt Thompson cast the organization in a bad light whenever he brought up their name. "Your commentary has included extreme hyperbole and your tactics have included personally attacking individuals for whom I have a great deal of respect," Walsh said in an open letter to Thompson.

Thompson has additionally worked to influence police investigations concerning violent acts which he views as being connected to violence in video games media. On June 2, 2006, Thompson suggested that West Feliciana Parish, Louisiana, police detectives, investigating the murder of 55-year-old Michael Gore by 17-year-old Kurt Edward Neher, should look into the video games played by Neher. According to Sheriff J. Austin Daniel, an autopsy showed Gore was beaten to death as well as shot in the face. Concerning this, Thompson stated that "nobody shoots anybody in the face unless you're a hit man or a video gamer."

=== Other public commentary ===
Thompson predicted that the perpetrator of the Beltway sniper attacks would be "a teenaged boy, who plays video games", and speculated incorrectly that he "may indeed ride a bicycle to and from his shooting locations, his gun broken down and placed in a backpack while he pedals." Saying that the shooter, Lee Boyd Malvo, had "trained" on Halo, Thompson later claimed credit for this on The Today Show: "I predicted that the Beltway sniper would be a teen-aged boy that trained on a game switched to sniper mode. And three months later, NBC reported that that's exactly what Malvo did. And Muhammad had him train on the game to suppress his inhibition to kill." John Muhammad was a Gulf War veteran and earned an expert marksmanship badge in the U.S. Army.

Thompson has also criticized a Christian video game based on the Left Behind series. In Left Behind: Eternal Forces, players participate in "battles raging in the streets of New York," according to the game's fact sheet. They engage in "physical and spiritual warfare: using the power of prayer to strengthen your troops in combat and wield modern military weaponry throughout the game world." Thompson claims that the makers of the game are sacrificing their values. He said, "Because of the Christian context, somehow it's OK? It's not OK. The context is irrelevant. It's a mass-killing game." Left Behind author Tim LaHaye disagrees, saying "Rather than forbid young people from viewing their favorite pastime, I prefer to give them something that's positive." The dispute over the game has caused Thompson to sever ties with Tyndale House, which publishes both the Left Behind books and Thompson's book, Out of Harm's Way. Thompson has not seen the game, which he says has "personally broken my heart," but claims, "I don't have to meet Abraham Lincoln to know that he was the 16th president of the United States."

In April 2007, only hours after the Virginia Tech shooting (and before Seung-Hui Cho was actually identified), Thompson predicted that the shooter had trained on the game Counter-Strike. According to Thompson, the game "drills you and gives you scenarios on how to kill them [and] gets you to kill them with your heart rate lower". He says that Cho "was in a hyper-reality situation in virtual reality". Though Cho had last been known to have played Counter-Strike in high school, four years prior to the shooting, Thompson asserts that "you don't drop it when you go to college, typically." Thompson disputed Cho's roommate's claim that Cho only used his computer to write fiction, on the grounds that "Cho was able to go room to room calmly, efficiently, coolly killing people." Prior to being identified, Thompson attributed the "flat effect [sic] on [Cho's] face" and the efficiency of his attack to video game rehearsals of the shooting. However, a search warrant released, listing the items found in Cho's dorm room, did not contain any video games, and a Washington Post story cited by Thompson later removed a paragraph stating that Cho enjoyed violent video games in high school. Despite all evidence indicating that Cho had not played Counter-Strike in years, Thompson continued to insist that "this is not rocket science. When a kid who has never killed anyone in his life goes on a rampage and looks like the Terminator, he's a video gamer." Thompson also sent a letter to Bill Gates, saying, "Mr. Gates, your company is potentially legally liable (for) the harm done at Virginia Tech. Your game, a killing simulator, according to the news that used to be in the Post, trained him to enjoy killing and how to kill." However, Microsoft did not create Counter-Strike – they only published the Xbox version of the game. The official Virginia state panel commissioned to investigate the shooting determined that Cho "played video games like Sonic the Hedgehog," and that "none of the video games [he had played] were war games or had violent themes."

In December 2007, Thompson filed suit against Omaha, Nebraska Police Chief Thomas Warren, asking him to produce information on all "violent entertainment material" belonging to Robert Hawkins, who killed nine people, including himself, in a shooting at the Westroads Mall earlier that month. According to the Omaha Police Department, such information is not a matter of public record, as it is part of an ongoing criminal investigation.

On February 15, 2008, Jack Thompson claimed that the actions of Steven Kazmierczak, who the previous day killed five people at Northern Illinois University before committing suicide, were influenced by the game Counter-Strike. In a subsequent news release, Thompson claimed that "We have a nation of Manchurian Candidate video gamers out there who are ready, willing, and able to massacre, and some of them will." Thompson also threatened the university with a lawsuit if the school did not provide copies of "all documents that reveal [Kazmierczak's] play of violent videogames."

=== Relationship with the gaming industry and gamers ===
Thompson's "high-profile crusades" have made him an enemy of video game aficionados.

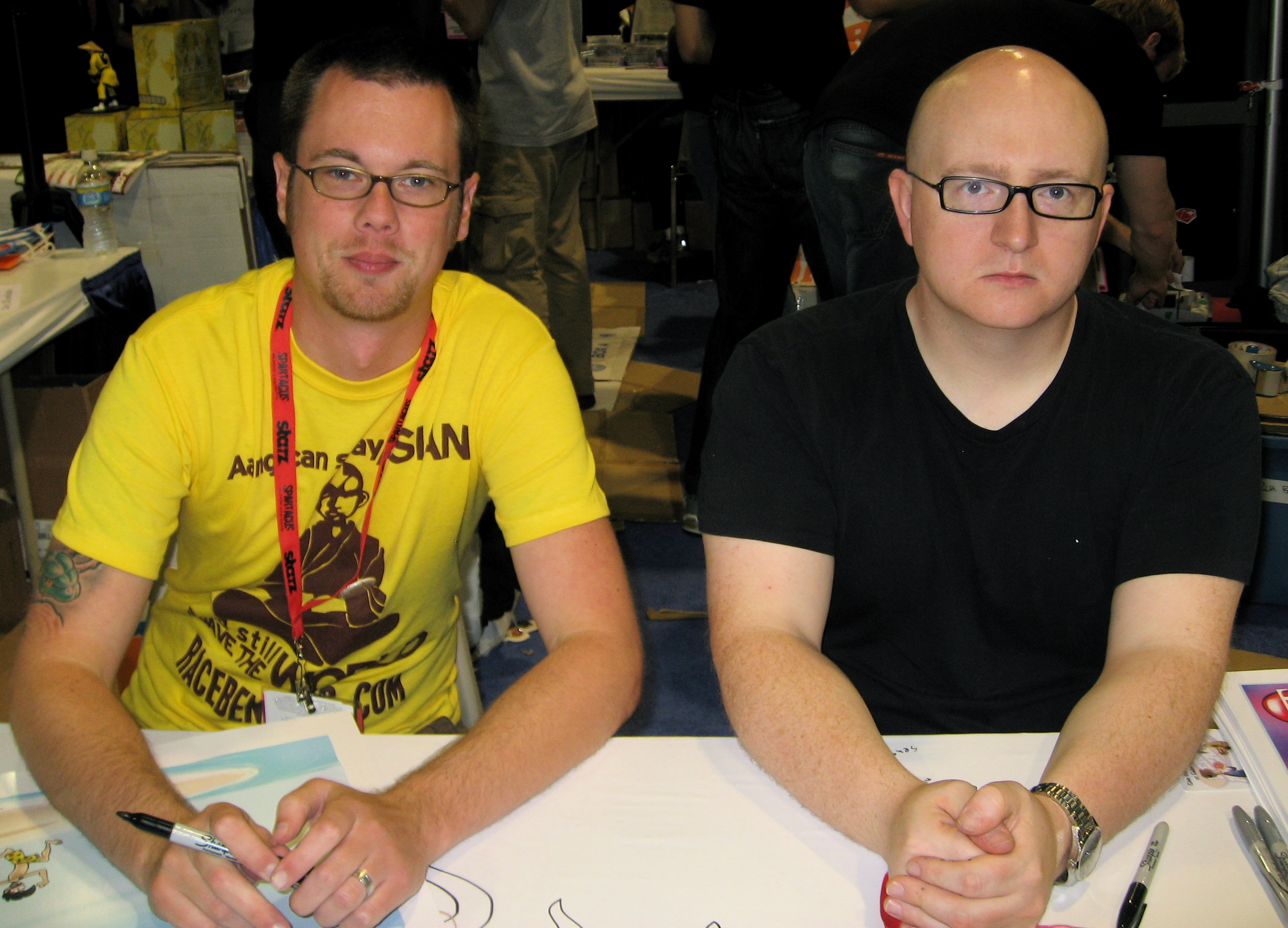
Mike Krahulik (left) and Jerry Holkins (right) stepped in to donate $10,000 to charity in Thompson's stead.

In response, Jerry Holkins and Mike Krahulik, the creators of gaming webcomic Penny Arcade and of the children's charity Child's Play, stepped in to make the US$10,000 (equivalent to $16,485 in 2025) donation instead, writing in the memo field of their cheque, "For Jack Thompson, Because Jack Thompson Won't." Afterwards, Thompson tried unsuccessfully to get Seattle police and the FBI to investigate Holkins and Krahulik for orchestrating "criminal harassment" of him through articles on their site. Other webcomics have regularly incorporated references to Thompson, alluding to this incident as well as others.

In 2006, two Michigan gamers began a project dubbed "Flowers for Jack", soliciting donations to deliver a massive floral arrangement to Thompson's office. The flowers were delivered in February along with a letter aimed at opening a dialogue between Thompson and the video gaming community. Thompson rejected this overture and forwarded the flowers to some of his industry foes, with such comments as "Discard them along with the decency you discarded long ago. I really don't care. Grind them up and smoke them if you like."

Gamers have responded to Thompson's attempt to link the Virginia Tech massacre to the game Counter-Strike. Video game Web sites and young gamers on Internet message boards "teemed with anger" at what San Francisco Chronicle reporter Peter Hartlaub called "his serial misstatements," in some cases linking to YouTube videos of Thompson and dissecting his claims point by point. Jason Della Rocca, executive director of the International Game Developers Association, said, "It's so sad. These massacre chasers—they're worse than ambulance chasers—they're waiting for these things to happen so they can jump on their soapbox." In response, Thompson referred to Della Rocca as an "idiot" and a "jackass ... paid not to connect the dots [connecting shootings to video games]", and compared himself to people who warned that the government should be more concerned about terrorism before the September 11, 2001 attacks. According to Della Rocca, Thompson then challenged him to a series of gaming debates, claiming that they could each make more than $3,000 per event. When Della Rocca suggested that neither he nor Thompson accept any money for the events, Thompson refused.

In July 2009, Entertainment Consumers Association (ECA) president Hal Halpin posted a copy of an email exchange between himself and Thompson, stating, "I get messages (IMs, emails, FB notes, etc.) from members all the time, asking what the (almost daily) notes are from JT. Since this one's fairly harmless and I've redacted anything personal (not that I don't love getting his threatening cease and desist letters), I thought I'd share it as a pretty typical exchange." Halpin and Thompson have been vocal opponents since 1998, when Halpin ran the game retail trade association IEMA. The exchange was sparked by a guest editorial that Halpin entitled, "Perception is Everything" for IndustryGamers.com where he called for consumers and the industry to speak out against negative stereotyping of gamers.

In March 2011, in response to the creation of a school shooter mod entitled School Shooter: North American Tour 2012, developed by Checkerboarded Studios on Valve's Source engine, Thompson emailed Valve's managing director, Gabe Newell, demanding that the mod be removed, as he speculated that Valve played a part in the mod's development. In the letter, Thompson stated that Half-Life was directly responsible for the Erfurt school massacre, as well as the Virginia Tech massacre and that Valve had until 5:00 p.m. on March 18 to remove the mod.

== The Howard Stern Show ==
In 2004, Thompson helped get Howard Stern's show taken off a radio station in Orlando, Florida, by filing a complaint with the Federal Communications Commission. Thompson objected to Stern's use of perceived obscenities on the air. He argued that "Either broadcasters will accept the light harness of decency that has been the law for decades and start cleaning up their acts, or the public's deepening outrage will foster a more fearsome governmental response." Thompson claimed to have received death threats from listeners of Stern's show, noting that "you'd expect that considering the IQ of people who listen to Howard Stern. Apparently they fail to realize that I might have caller ID."

During his opposition to Howard Stern, Thompson was asked in an interview with a reporter if, by his standards, he would blame Christianity for the murders committed by Michael Hernandez, a fourteen-year-old who murdered one of his classmates in 2004, because Hernandez wrote a diary in which he constantly spoke about praying to God. Thompson replied, "The Bible doesn't promote killing innocent people, Grand Theft Auto does. Islam does." Thompson then expanded his comments in the same interview by saying, "Islam promotes the killing of innocent people. The Quran requires the infidel, whether Jew or Christian, to be killed. ... That's a core essence of the religion. ... Muhammad was a pirate who killed infidels and who advocated the killing of infidels—not a nice guy. Osama bin Laden is in keeping with his fine tradition." According to Thompson, "The reason why CBS chose not to edit Stern is that Stern's Arbitron ratings remained high and were arguably even enhanced by people tuning in to hear daily about Stern's running feud with CBS and his move to Sirius. In other words, CBS actually used Stern's discussion of his move to Sirius to make more money for CBS."

CBS President Les Moonves responded, saying "You know what? You can't let people like that tell you what to put on the air or what not to put on the air. That would only open the door when suddenly next week, he says, 'Take David Letterman off the air or take C.S.I. off the air.' Or you know what? Everybody Loves Raymond was about, you know, sex last week or about a 70-year-old man—you know, we dealt with Peter Boyle having sex with Doris Roberts. 'Take that off the air.' That's something we can't let happen."

== The Florida Bar ==
=== Actions against the bar ===
In 1993, Thompson asked a Florida judge to declare the Florida Bar unconstitutional. He said that the Bar was engaged in a vendetta against him because of his religious beliefs, which he said conflicted with what he called the Bar's pro-gay, humanist, liberal agenda. He also said that the "wedding of all three functions of government into the Florida Bar, the 'official arm' of the Florida Supreme Court, is violative of the bedrock constitutional requirement of the separation powers and the 'checks and balances' which the separation guarantees." Thompson accepted a $20,000 out-of-court settlement.

On January 7, 2002, Thompson sent the Supreme Court of Florida a letter regarding the Florida Bar's actions. The letter was filed with the court on January 10, 2002, and was treated as a petition for a writ of mandamus against the Florida Bar. Before any action was taken on the petition, Thompson sent the court another letter on January 28, 2002, voluntarily dismissing the case. The letter was filed with the court on January 30, 2002, and the Florida Supreme Court issued an order of dismissal on February 28, 2002.

In January 2006, Thompson asked the Justice Department to investigate the Florida Bar's actions. "The Florida Bar and its agents have engaged in a documented pattern of this illegal activity, which may sink to the level of criminal racketeering activity, in a knowing and illegal effort to chill my federal First Amendment rights," Thompson wrote in a letter to Alex Acosta, interim U.S. attorney for the Southern District of Florida.

In April 2006, Thompson filed another suit against the Florida Bar, this time in the U.S. District Court for the Southern District of Florida, alleging that the Bar harassed him by investigating what he called baseless complaints made by disgruntled opponents in previous disputes. His five-count complaint asked for more than $1 million in damages. The lawsuit alleged that the Bar was pursuing baseless ethics complaints brought against Thompson by Tew Cardenas attorneys Lawrence Kellogg and Alberto Cardenas of Miami, and by two lawyers from the Philadelphia office of Blank Rome, in violation of Thompson's constitutional rights. According to the lawsuit, the Bar looked at Thompson for violations of a bar rule that prohibits attorneys from making disparaging remarks about judges, other attorneys, or court personnel. Thompson also filed a motion with the court to order the mediation of his dispute with the Bar. Thompson commented, "I enjoy doing what I do and I think I've got a First Amendment right to annoy people and participate in the public square in the cultural war." Thompson also said he is optimistic his federal lawsuit will be successful. "I'm 100 percent certain that it will effect change, otherwise I would not have filed it."

On April 25, 2006, the Florida Bar filed a motion to dismiss Thompson's complaint. The Bar argued that Thompson's complaint should be dismissed for a number of reasons, including the fact that the complaint failed to state a claim on which he could be granted relief. The Bar also argued that it was absolutely immune from liability for actions arising out of its disciplinary functions, that the Eleventh Amendment barred Thompson's recovery of damages, and that the court should dismiss the case pursuant to the abstention doctrine of Younger v. Harris. On May 4, 2006, Thompson filed a motion asking Judge Federico Moreno to recuse himself from the case, as Judge Moreno was a member of the Florida Bar. Citing an "abundance of caution," Judge Moreno recused himself on May 9, 2006, and referred the case to Chief Judge William Zloch for further action. Thompson did not, however, respond to The Bar's motion to dismiss the case. Finally, on May 17, 2006, Thompson filed a Notice of Voluntary Dismissal with the court, and the case was dismissed without prejudice.

=== Filings ===
In October 2007, Federico Moreno, the then-Chief U.S. District Judge, sealed court documents submitted by Thompson in the Bar case that depicted "gay sex acts". Thompson's submission prompted U.S. District Judge Adalberto Jordan to order Thompson to show cause why his actions should not be filed as a grievance with the court's Ad Hoc Committee on Attorney Admissions, Peer Review and Attorney Grievance, but the order was dismissed after Thompson promised not to file any more pornography. Thompson then sent letters to acting U.S. Attorney General Peter Keisler and U.S. Senators Patrick Leahy and Arlen Specter demanding that Jordan be removed from his position for failing to prosecute Florida attorney Norm Kent, who Thompson claimed had "collaborated" with the Bar for 20 years to discipline him.

On March 20, 2008, the Florida Supreme Court imposed sanctions on Thompson, requiring that any of his future filings in the court be signed by a member of the Florida Bar other than himself. The court noted that Thompson had responded to the show cause order with multiple "rambling, argumentative, and contemptuous" responses that characterized the show cause order as "bizarre" and "idiotic".

=== Disbarment ===
In February 2007, the Florida Bar filed disbarment proceedings against Thompson over allegations of professional misconduct. The action was the result of separate grievances filed by people claiming that Thompson made defamatory, false statements and attempted to humiliate, embarrass, harass or intimidate them. According to the complaint, Thompson accused Alberto Cardenas of "distribution of pornography to children", claimed that the Alabama judge presiding over the Devin Moore case "breaks the rules, even the Alabama State Bar Rules, because he thinks that the rules don't apply to him", and sent a letter to Blank Rome's managing partner, saying, "Your law firm has actively and knowingly facilitated by various means the criminal distribution of sexual material to minors." Thompson claims that the complaints violate state religious protections because his advocacy is motivated by his Christian faith.

In May 2008, Miami-Dade Circuit Judge Dava Tunis, after reviewing 2,400 pages of transcripts and 1,700 pages of exhibits, recommended that Thompson be found guilty of 27 of the 31 violations of which he had been accused, including making false statements to tribunals, disparaging and humiliating litigants and other lawyers, and improperly practicing law outside of Florida. Thompson filed a motion with the Florida Supreme Court the day after the report was issued to strike Tunis' recommendations as vague for lack of detail. Previously, Thompson had attempted to have Tunis thrown off his case, and filed a complaint against her with the state Judicial Qualifications Commission, which is responsible for investigating judges.

On June 4, 2008, prosecutor Sheila Tuma recommended 'enhanced disbarment' for Thompson, saying that Thompson demonstrated continued misconduct, a pattern of misconduct and persistently failed to admit any wrongdoing. Enhanced disbarment lengthens the period before an attorney may reapply for admission to the bar from five years to ten. After being prevented from making a speech to begin the disciplinary hearing, Thompson distributed his written objections to lawyers, a court reporter, and a newspaper reporter, departed the courtroom, and called the proceedings against him a "star chamber" and "kangaroo court".

On July 8, 2008, Judge Tunis recommended permanent disbarment and a US$43,675.35 (equivalent to $65,311 in 2025) fine for Thompson to the Florida Supreme Court, citing "cumulative misconduct, a repeated pattern of behavior relentlessly forced upon numerous unconnected individuals, a total lack of remorse or even slight acknowledgment of inappropriate conduct, and continued behavior consistent with the previous public reprimand... Over a very extended period of time involving a number of totally unrelated cases and individuals, the Respondent has demonstrated a pattern of conduct to strike out harshly, extensively, repeatedly and willfully to simply try to bring as much difficulty, distraction and anguish to those he considers in opposition to his causes... He does not proceed within the guidelines of appropriate professional behavior, but rather uses other means available to intimidate, harass, or bring public disrepute to those whom he perceives oppose him." The court approved the recommendation and fine on September 25, 2008, and ordered that Thompson be permanently disbarred effective 30 days from the date of the order so Thompson could close out his practice. He later filed for an emergency stay of the Florida Supreme Court's order with the U.S. District Court, which was ultimately denied. In an e-mail to media outlets, Thompson responded to the court's decision by stating, "The timing of this disbarment transparently reveals its motivation: this past Friday Thompson filed a federal civil rights action against The Bar, the Supreme Court, and all seven of its Justices. This rush to disbarment is in retribution for the filing of that federal suit. With enemies this foolish, Thompson needs only the loyal friends he has." He closed the email—in which he included the court ruling—with, "...this should be fun, starting now".

On September 19, 2009, Thompson announced that he intended to resume practicing law as of October 1, 2009, claiming that he was "never disbarred" because all of the orders resulting in his disbarment were legal nullities. He dared the Florida Bar to get a court order to stop him, although as of 2022 he had not practiced law since his disbarment.

== Other activities ==
In 1992, a complaint from Thompson led Florida Secretary of State Jim Smith to withhold a $25,000 grant to the Miami Film Festival; Thompson claimed that the festival was using state money to show pornographic films. In response, Thompson was named an "Art Censor of the Year" by the ACLU. The next month, Thompson faced disbarment over allegations that he lied while making accusations against prominent Dade County lawyer Stuart Z Grossman. Thompson ultimately admitted violating bar rules of professional conduct, including charges that he contacted people represented by an attorney without first contacting their attorneys, and agreed to pay $3,000 in fines and receive a public reprimand.

In 1999, Thompson represented the parents of Bryce Kilduff, an 11-year-old boy who committed suicide by hanging himself. Police believed that the death was an accident, and that Kilduff was imitating Kenny, a character from the Comedy Central series South Park, which Bryce, according to his parents, had never watched. Thompson called for Comedy Central to stop marketing the show and toys based on the series to children. He said: "You see, the whole show—thrust of the show is it's—it's cool for kids to act like the characters in South Park."

Prior to Thompson's disbarment, attorney Norm Kent filed a personal lawsuit against him, which eventually resulted in Thompson paying Kent $50,000 for defamation.

On February 21, 2007, Thompson filed a complaint with the Florida Judicial Qualifications Commission against Judge Larry Seidlin, accusing Seidlin of "violating nearly every judicial canon" in conducting a hearing on the disposition of the body of Anna Nicole Smith.

In March 2008, Thompson called for the New York State Supreme Court's Appellate Division to immediately suspend the law license of former state governor Eliot Spitzer, who had resigned from the position amidst reports he was a client of a prostitution ring. Thompson said that the Disciplinary Committee for the Appellate Division's First Department should stop Spitzer from practicing law until the matter was resolved, noting that Spitzer did not claim innocence in his initial public apology.

In an April 2016 interview with Inverse, Thompson revealed that he was teaching civics classes to inmates in the Florida prison system, including an American history and constitutional law class at the Everglades Correctional Institution.

=== Facebook lawsuit ===
Thompson filed a lawsuit for $40 million against Facebook in the U.S. District Court for the Southern District of Florida on September 29, 2009. Thompson claimed that the social networking site had caused him "great harm and distress" by not removing angry postings made by users in several Facebook groups. Thompson withdrew his case less than two months later. According to Parry Aftab, a cyber-law attorney, Thompson would likely not have had any success because the U.S. Communications Decency Act provides that companies such as Facebook have no liability for what users do with their services in most cases.

== Bibliography ==
- Out of Harm's Way. Wheaton, IL: Tyndale House Publishers, 2005. ISBN 1-4143-0442-0.

== See also ==
- GamePolitics.com – Frequently covered Thompson
- Spencer Halpin's Moral Kombat – Thompson is interviewed
- Playing Columbine – Thompson is interviewed
- The Gamechangers – Docudrama starring Bill Paxton as Thompson
