= Norinco HP9-1 =

- Type: Shotgun
- Place of origin: China

Service history
- In service: 1999–present
- Wars: Lebanese Civil War

Production history
- Designer: Norinco
- Manufacturer: Norinco
- Produced: 1999 - present

Specifications
- Mass: varies upon model
- Length: 12.5 inches (320 mm), 14 inches (360 mm) and 18 inches (460 mm)
- Barrel length: 14 inches (360 mm)
- Cartridge: 12 gauge 2.5-inch and 3-inch shells
- Action: Pump-action
- Feed system: 4 round internal tube magazine
- Sights: Bead front or ghost ring iron sights

The Norinco HP9-1, also known as the Norinco N870-14.00 and Norinco M982, is a short pump action shotgun made by weapons manufacturer Norinco (North China Industries Corporation).

== Design ==
This 12 gauge smoothbore shotgun has a 14-inch (36 cm) barrel and a rust-resistant parkerized finish.

It is also available with 12.5-inch (31.75 cm) and 18-inch barrel (45.72 cm) variants. Different sights are available as well, ranging from traditional bead sights to ghost ring sights.

The Norinco HP9 is a copy of the Remington 870, a widely distributed design no longer under patent protection, and most of the parts interchange freely.

== Legality ==
=== In the United States ===
In 1993, the import of most Norinco firearms and ammunition into the United States was blocked under new trade rules when China's permanent normal trade relations status was renewed.

The prohibition did not apply to sporting shotguns or shotgun ammunition, however.

Longer barreled versions (18" minimum) are also available for purchase in the US, where ownership of short barreled shotguns requires a $200 tax stamp.

In the United States, where other Norinco products are specifically non-importable, this gun is imported and sold under the names Norinco Hawk 982 and Interstate Hawk 982.

=== In Canada ===
The Norinco HP9 can be legally purchased and owned in Canada, as it falls under the "non-restricted" firearm class.

The rules and regulations in regard to storage, transportation and handling of non-restricted firearms apply. Non-restricted firearms are classified as ordinary rifles and shotguns.

As defined by the Criminal Code of Canada, a firearm is classified as:

- "prohibited" if the barrel has been shortened to less than 18-inches (457mm), after leaving the factory, "by sawing, cutting or any other alteration or modification" that forces the firearm into the "prohibited firearm" class.
- "restricted" if it left the factory with the barrel at or below 18 inches (457mm) in length and the overall dimensions of the firearm maintain a length shorter than 26 inches (660mm).
- "non-restricted" if it left the factory with the barrel at or below 18 inches (457mm) in length but the overall dimensions of the firearm maintain a length of 26 inches (660mm) or longer and the firearm action is not semi-automatic.

== Variants ==
=== Type 97 ===
Export variants featuring various configurations.

== Users ==
- Bangladesh
- China
  - People's Police
  - People's Armed Police
  - People's Liberation Army
  - Private security companies
- Kurdistan Region
  - Peshmerga
- Lebanon
  - Seen in use during the civil war

== See also ==
- Remington 870
- Remington 1100
- Saiga 12
- Vepr 12
- Combat shotgun
- QBS-09
