= Ship of Fools (short story) =

1999 short story by Ted Kaczynski

- Short story by Ted Kaczynski
- Country: United States
- Language: English

Publication
- Published in: Off! Magazine
- Publication date: 1999

"Ship of Fools" is a 1999 short story by Ted Kaczynski. The story is a parable demonstrating Kaczynski's views that identity politics within liberalism is a distraction from the issue of climate apocalypse and that revolutionary violence is justified.

== About ==
"Ship of Fools" was written for Off!, a student magazine at State University of New York (SUNY) in Binghamton, New York. It was written at the request of Tom LaPietra, a student at SUNY. The story also appeared on the website for Context Books. It is 11 pages long. Kaczynski wrote the parable from prison.

The short story is about a ship that is headed north to the Arctic Ocean. Despite the presence of dangerous icebergs, the crew pay no attention to the wellbeing of the ship as they are too busy arguing among themselves about various injustices. The crew includes a Mexican sailor, a Native American sailor, a gay bosun, an animal rights activist, and a female passenger. The Mexican sailor asks for equal pay, the Native American sailor asks for reparations for losing his ancestral land, the gay bosun objects to homophobic slurs and asks for the "right to suck cocks without being called names for it", the animal rights activist objects to the mistreatment of the dog on the ship, and the female passenger asks for as many blankets as the male passengers receive. The ship's officers conspire to make small concessions to these demands while remaining on course.

Only the cabin boy, a representation of Kaczynski, recognizes the danger and tries to get the others to help him maneuver the ship. He suggests to the crew that they kill the officers and turn the ship around, but he is increasingly frustrated as the others focus on their own demands and reject him for calling their grievances trivial. The story ends with the ship getting crushed between two icebergs, sinking, and killing everyone.

The manuscript for "Ship of Fools" is included with "The Writings of Ted Kaczynski" in the Kaczynski Papers collection at the University of Michigan Library.

== Reception ==
The short story was criticized by the Baltimore Sun for its "colorful ethnic language" and justification of revolutionary violence. Tom LaPietra has said the parable is about Kaczynski's belief that "People who are leftist shouldn't waste their time with what he calls reform, such as equal wages and equal treatment for women...The main issue is we have to stop the industrial machine before it takes away all of our humanity."

Kaczynski responded to accusations of homophobia by stating, "I mildly dislike homosexuality" but that "My contempt (as expressed, e.g., in "Ship of Fools") is not for gay people, women, ethnic minorities, or sweatshop workers, but for activists who think that the special problems of these groups are more important than the disaster with which the technoindustrial system threatens the world."

== Legacy ==
In 2006 the Norwegian artist Gardar Eide Einarsson staged a play based on Ship of Fools at the Palais de Tokyo in Paris.

The French anti-tech movement known as "Anti-Tech Resistance" takes inspiration from Kaczynski, having "Ship of Fools" available to read on their website both in its original version in English and in a French translation titled "La nef des fous".

== See also ==
- Class reductionism
- Ship of fools
- Intersectionality
