= Switchboard of Miami =

Counseling organization in Miami, Florida, US

Coordinates: 25.7769°N 80.1906°W

Switchboard of Miami, Inc.
- Formation: 1968
- Type: Private, non-profit organization
- Headquarters: Miami, Florida, U.S.
- CEO: Catherine Penrod
- Website: SwitchboardMiami.org

Switchboard of Miami, Inc., commonly referred to as Switchboard, was a private, nonprofit and registered 501(c)(3) organization located in Miami, Florida, United States that provided Miami-Dade County with comprehensive telephone counseling and referral services to thousands of social service programs beginning in 1968. The organization also offered counseling services and prevention programs, such as initiatives aimed at assisting high-risk youth and their families through partnerships with local schools. Since 1968, these services have been offered to the community at no charge. Callers can seek advice confidentially, as no information is needed by the company in order to receive the services. Switchboard shut down in 2016 following a "major financial emergency".

== Credentials ==
The organization maintained a HELPline Services Department that was certified by the American Association of Suicidology, licensed by the Florida Department of Children and Families and accredited by the Alliance of Information and Referral Systems.

== Partnerships ==
Switchboard partnered with other organizations to receive additional funding and pool resources, including the United Way of Miami, Miami-Dade County and The Children's Trust. Switchboard answered the 2-1-1 hotline in Miami, which is funded by The Children's Trust to help children and families seek information on issues related to school, substance use disorders, domestic violence, teen pregnancy and more. Switchboard was also one of many partners working with the United Way through Operation Helping Hands to provide aid for earthquake victims in Haiti and Chile.

== Services and projects ==
The organization was involved in many campaigns throughout Miami, working with other community partners on projects such as attracting Creole-speaking volunteers that can answer calls made by those who would like to know more about the disaster in Haiti and those who were directly affected by the disaster.

=== HELPline information ===
Every year more than 168,000 people called the HELPline, which was accessed at (305) 358-HELP (4357). Services offered by Switchboard were available in English, Spanish and Creole, making it the only trilingual call center in the United States. The call center acted as the backup for the National Suicide Prevention Lifeline for the entire United States in Spanish and for the Southeastern United States in English.

In addition to the 2-1-1 hotline and the 358-HELP line, the organization maintained other service hotlines designed to target specific needs in the community.

1. Switchboard was part of the network of crisis centers for the National Suicide Prevention Lifeline and the 1-800-SUICIDE Hotline, which are both designed to link individuals in an immediate crisis situation with counselors who are trained to prevent loss of life.
2. The GLBT Awareness Initiative Hotine serves the gay, lesbian, bisexual and transgender (GLBT) community by providing education, prevention and intervention discussions for partners, friends and loved ones. It is funded in part by the Dade Community Foundation and the Roblee Foundation.
3. The Teen Link Hotline gives young adults access to information on relevant topics including drug use, health issues, physical abuse, sexuality, relationships, pregnancy, family and school.
4. The Youth Gang Hotline provides effective information and referral services via trained counselors to minimize youth gang involvements. Services are available for youth, parents, teachers, clergy and others dealing with a loved one involved in gang activity. The hotline is funded in part by Miami-Dade County.
5. The Seniors Never Alone Program (SNAP) is a telephone reassurance program for individuals 65 years of age and older that provides a connection for those who might live alone or have little contact with loved ones. Seniors are called at least twice a week to ensure physical and mental health as well as provide moral support. The program was initiated by former Miami-Dade County Commissioner Jose "Pepe" Diaz and is funded in part by Miami-Dade County.
6. The Jackson Health System - Rape Treatment Center Hotline is the after-hours answering service for the Roxcy Bolton Rape Treatment Center (RTC), funded by the Jackson Health system. The hotline provides crisis counseling, suicide prevention and referral services, as well as the ability to activate the RTC Response Team which consists of trained physicians, nurses and counselors at the facility.
7. Operation Helping Hands is a specialized hotline that is only operational when activated by United Way of Miami during times of major unanticipated catastrophe.
8. The Miami-Dade County Public Schools Employee Assistance Program is a hotline designed only for use by employees of Miami-Dade County Public Schools as an after-hours answering service for the Miami-Dade County Public Schools Employee Assistance Program. It is funded by Miami-Dade County Public Schools to offer telephone support, follow-up and emergency response.
9. The Florida BrAIve Helpline was created through The Florida BrAIve Fund and is Florida's largest information and referral network. The line is dedicated to the servicemen and women who served in operations Enduring Freedom and Iraqi Freedom, as well as assisting other war veterans and their families.

=== Local media exposure ===
Switchboard earned exposure on many news outlets in Miami including television stations such as WFOR 4, WTVJ 6 and WPLG 10, as well as printed media such as The Miami Herald and the Miami New Times. This press coverage often leads to stronger partnerships, such as the Care Force initiative created by WPLG 10, which connected philanthropic individuals in the community to stories they would see in a segment during WPLG's news broadcasts. The partnership allowed viewers to access a helpline answered by Switchboard, providing help in order to fill the needs of those featured in the segment.

== Company information ==
=== History ===
In 1968, Switchboard of Miami began as a hotline created by three volunteers to help connect college students to resources that would assist them in finding affordable housing options in Miami-Dade County. Soon after, as the Republican National Convention was taking place in Miami during the time, city officials reached out to the volunteers to ask for their help in maintaining order. The Vietnam War was part of the public agenda, and millions of residents were furious about how it affected their lives. The volunteers agreed to help, and were soon inundated with calls regarding issues far more complex than housing troubles.

Shortly thereafter, the volunteers incorporated to become Switchboard of Miami, Inc. and expanded their hotline services, clinical services and assistance to the community. A full company timeline can be found below.

- 1968: Three volunteers meet in a church basement and create a loosely organized housing hotline to connect Miami Dade Community College (now Miami Dade College) students with potential roommates and landlords. City officials contact the volunteers for help with the anticipated Vietnam War protestors who would likely create havoc as the Republican National Convention convened here. They agree and the "housing hotline" begins to receive calls from visiting dissenters that go beyond housing needs to a myriad of issues such as hunger, substance use disorders, violence, etc. Because many of the callers were young, the housing hotline was nicknamed the "hippie hotline."
- 1970: The organization officially incorporates as Switchboard of Miami, Inc. and continues to offer HELPline services.
- 1980: Direct, face-to-face prevention and clinical services for youth and their families are offered in schools and the community to help strengthen and maintain local family units.
- 1980-81: Over 125,000 Cubans arrive in South Florida as part of the Mariel Boatlift. About 10% of the refugees were from mental institutions and prisons and are in need of crisis services. The HELPline expands to offer a special hotline specifically for the immigrants. Services are offered in English and Spanish. Several years later, Creole is added.
- Mid 1980s: The use of crack cocaine explodes in Miami-Dade County. To provide substance use disorder services, Switchboard becomes licensed by the Florida Department of Children and Families (then HRS). The HELPline employs updated phone counseling methods, case management and referrals for people with drug and alcohol problems. Telephone services now include comprehensive follow-up.
- 1990: Teen Link, 24-hour hotline for younger residents, is added. Using prerecorded messages, teens are able to easily access a variety of factual information over the phone. If needed, they can speak with a counselor. The line still exists today and has received over 2.5 million calls since its inception.
- 1992: The HELPages become the first comprehensive printed social services in the county. A critical resource tool for service providers and other organizations, the directory is in great demand. Today, the HELPages are available on-line.
- 1993: Hurricane Andrew devastates South Florida and the HELPline receives more than 1,500 calls each day. Switchboard works with other organizations like the American Red Cross, the Federal Emergency Management Agency (FEMA), and the United Way to coordinate post-disaster information. In Homestead and Cutler Ridge, Switchboard staff are deployed to offer crisis counseling and referrals. Switchboard is a co-founder of the county's Voluntary Organizations Active in Disaster (DC-VOAD). Years later, Switchboard still participates in annual disaster preparedness planning and works closely with the local Office of Emergency Management. When a disaster is pending, Switchboard sends a team of crisis counselors to the center for the Florida Division of Emergency Operations and the HELPline remains open during the worst of conditions.
- 1997: Concerned about violence directed at the gay community, Switchboard creates an Anti-Violence hotline to serve as a resource to help victims of violence and to build awareness and acceptance about gay/lesbian issues.
- Late 1990s: Switchboard begins to offer specialty lines such as: Miami River Hotline (environmental concerns); WAGES Hotline (for those transitioning out of the welfare system); ACCESS Hotline (for people with disabilities and their families); and, United Way Careline (donors). As community needs change, lines are added and discontinued.
- 2000: New direct service programs are added to deal with a variety of issues related to youth: substance use disorder; truancy; domestic violence; and pregnancy prevention. Switchboard also launched direct services sponsored by federal funding to replicate research related to best-practices, and evidenced based curriculum.
- 2003: Switchboard becomes the local certified 2-1-1 Provider; later, The Children's Trust funds the 2-1-1 line.
- 2006: Seniors Never Alone, an in- and out- bound program to ensure the well-being of senior citizens is established.
- 2008: Switchboard begins to answer 2-1-1 for wireless phone callers in Collier and Monroe Counties. In total, Switchboard answers 183,000 phone calls in 2008.
- 2009: Named as an official back-up for Lifeline, Switchboard begins to receive suicide-related calls from Spanish callers nationwide and English-speakers from the Southeastern United States, while remaining the Lifeline Center for Miami-Dade callers. Switchboard averages about 1700 suicide-related calls. Also, a special two-year funded project from the Dade Foundation creates BrAIve, a helpline for veterans and active personnel of the Afghanistan and Iraq military arenas and their families.
- 2016: Switchboard closed and transferred its staff and services to other organizations, such as Jewish Community Services.

=== Vision ===
Switchboard of Miami's vision was "to be the premier organization that provides and connects people with the human services they need."

=== Mission statement ===
The mission statement read "Switchboard of Miami connects all people in need with community resources, provides counseling and empowers individuals 24/7 with just one call."

== See also ==
- 2-1-1 telephone number
- Crisis hotlines: Criticism and logistical issues
