= Doug Lowenstein =

Founder and former president of the Entertainment Software Association

Douglas Lowenstein is an American business executive, former president of the Entertainment Software Association, and former newspaper reporter.

== Life and career ==
Lowenstein graduated from Washington University in St. Louis in 1973, and started his career as a reporter for the Buffalo Courier-Express from 1973 to 1974. He was awarded the Buffalo Newspaper Guild's Rookie of the Year award in 1974. He moved to Washington, DC, in 1974 to take a position as a reporter for the Capitol Hill News Service. In 1976, he joined the Cox Newspapers Washington Bureau. After six years at Cox, Lowenstein joined the Senate staff of U.S. Sen. Howard Metzenbaum, Democrat of Ohio. He served the last two years of his five-year stint on the Hill as Metzenbaum's legislative director.

Lowenstein became the first president of the Entertainment Software Association (ESA), then called the Interactive Digital Software Association (IDSA), in June 1994. Creator and owner of the E3 Tradeshow, the Entertainment Software Rating Board (ESRB), and the Academy of Interactive Arts and Sciences, the ESA is the only association exclusively dedicated to serving the business and public affairs needs of companies that publish video and computer games, for video game consoles, personal computers, and the Internet. As president, Lowenstein was responsible for the association's operations and for sector-wide initiatives that affect the nation's fastest-growing entertainment industry.

Lowenstein worked cooperatively with parallel industry trade associations including the Video Software Dealers Association (VSDA) and Interactive Entertainment Merchants Association (IEMA) to defeat hundreds of anti-games legislation across the United States. He was the industry's go-to person in Washington, D.C., on all legislative matters ranging from piracy to censorship and was frequently called upon as the trade's spokesperson, representing the software publisher's perspective.

Lowenstein was a very public figure in his service of the games business ― along with Patricia Vance, ESRB head and Hal Halpin, IEMA boss ― and as such had both his supporters and detractors in the industry and media. Critics were vocal about his passivity with regard to anti-games advocates, most notably Jack Thompson, who repeatedly attacked Lowenstein personally and professionally, even going so far as to liken him to "Hitler". Lowenstein did, however, deliver a very pointed speech in his final days in the job which drew the ire of many in the interactive entertainment business.

Prior to joining the staff of the ESA, Lowenstein was an executive vice president in the Washington, D.C., and New York strategic communications firm Robinson Lake Sawyer Miller, Inc. From 1986 to 1991, Lowenstein was a principal in National Strategies, Inc., a Washington, D.C., public policy consulting firm. In 1982, he began a five year-stint in the office of U.S. Sen. Howard Metzenbaum (D-Ohio), including two as Legislative Director. From 1976 to 1982, Lowenstein was a Washington, D.C., correspondent in the Cox Newspapers Washington bureau. Lowenstein is also the author of "Lowenstein:Acts of Courage and Belief" about his late uncle, political and civil rights activist and former Congressman Allard Lowenstein.

Lowenstein resigned from ESA on February 12, 2007 to head up the newly formed Private Equity Council.

In 2010, the publication CEO Update named Lowenstein as one of its “Top Association CEOs” of the year.
