= List of Pi Lambda Phi members =

Pi Lambda Phi is an international college fraternity that was founded in 1895 at Yale University in New Haven, Connecticut. Below is a list of Pi Lambda Phi notable members.

== Academia ==
Name	Original chapter	Initiation year	Notability	References
Mark Eisner	NY Beta	1905 grad	Chairman of the Board of Higher Education, New York from 1931 to 1953 and New York State Assembly	
Ralph Gerard	IL Omicron	1919	neurophysiologist and behavioral scientist known for his wide-ranging work on the nervous system, nerve metabolism, psychopharmacology, and biological basis of schizophrenia. Gerard was a professor at several universities including the University of South Dakota, the University of Chicago, the College of Medicine at the University of Illinois, a fellow at the Center for Advanced Study in the Behavioral Sciences in Stanford, California, and the University of Michigan in Ann Arbor, where he helped to establish the Mental Health Research Institute. He helped to organize the newly forming Irvine campus of the University of California, and became its first Dean of its Graduate Division until his retirement in 1970. After retirement, he initiated the activities, under the auspices of the National Academy of Sciences, which led to the founding of the highly successful Society for Neuroscience.	
Abraham Gillow	PA Epsilon Zeta	1939	Dean of the Stern School of Business at New York University from 1965 to 1985 and currently Dean Emeritus and Professor in Economics Emeritus. Author of numerous books including Corruption in Corporate America: Who is Responsible? Who Will Protect the Public Interest? and Being the Boss: The Importance of Leadership and Power.	
Steven A. Orszag	MA Theta	1960	mathematician. He was the Percey F. Smith Professor of Mathematics at Yale University. Orszag specialized in fluid dynamics, especially turbulence, computational physics and mathematics, electronic chip manufacturing, computer storage system design, and other topics in scientific computing. His work included the development of spectral methods, pseudo-spectral methods, direct numerical simulations, renormalization group methods for turbulence, and very-large-eddy simulations. He was the founder of and/or chief scientific adviser to several companies, including Flow Research, Ibrix (now part of HPQ), Vector Technologies, and Exa Corp. He has been awarded 6 patents and has written over 400 archival papers.	
Gene Sharp	OH Alpha Epsilon	1949	Anarchist is known for his extensive writings on nonviolent struggle: he has been called both the "Machiavelli of nonviolence" and the "Clausewitz of nonviolent warfare." Professor Emeritus of political science at the University of Massachusetts Dartmouth. He held a research appointment at Harvard University's Center for International Affairs for almost 30 years. In 1983, he founded the Albert Einstein Institution, a non-profit organization devoted to studies and promotion of the use of nonviolent action in conflicts worldwide.	
Paul R. Verkuil	VA Psi	1958	Dean of the Tulane University Law School, a president of the College of William and Mary, and a dean of Cardozo School of Law. He also served as the CEO of the Automobile Association from 1992 to 1995. He is currently on the faculty of the Cardozo School of Law. In 2009, Verkuil was nominated by President Barack Obama to be head of the Administrative Conference of the United States.	
Ezra Vogel	OH Beta Sigma	1951	Henry Ford II Research Professor of the Social Sciences, emeritus at Harvard University. He started his career in 1960 as an assistant professor at Yale University and then as a postdoctoral fellow at Harvard, studying Chinese language and history. He remained at Harvard, becoming a professor in 1967 and succeeded John Fairbank as second director (1972–1977) of Fairbank Center for East Asian Research at Harvard. He was the second chairman of the Council for East Asian Studies (1977–1980). He was director of the Program on U.S.-Japan Relations at the Center for International Affairs (1980–1987) and, since 1987, honorary director. He was director of the Undergraduate Concentration in East Asian Studies from its inception in 1972 until 1989. In 1993, he took a two-year leave of absence, serving as national intelligence officer for East Asia at the National Intelligence Council. He returned to Harvard in September 1995 to direct the Fairbank Center until 1999 and was head of the Asia Center from 1997 to 1999. The Japanese edition of Professor Vogel's book Japan as Number One: Lessons for America (1979) remains the all-time best-seller in Japan of non-fiction by a Western author.	

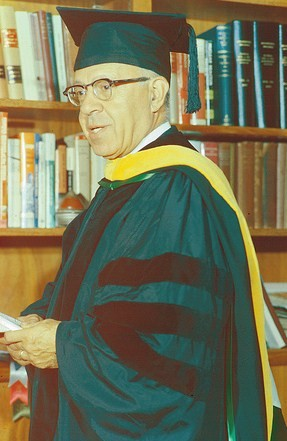
Joseph Weil

== Art and architecture ==
Name	Original chapter	Initiation year	Notability	References
Ted Key	CA Tau	1931	Cartoonist and writer, and creator of the cartoon series Hazel.	
Joel Wachs	CA Upsilon	1959	President of the Andy Warhol Foundation for the Visual Arts, Inc., since 2001. He was previously a Los Angeles City Councilman who authored the nation's first law prohibiting discrimination against persons with AIDS.	

== Business ==
Name	Original chapter	Initiation year	Notability	References
Louis Broido	PA Gamma Sigma	1917	Executive vice president of Gimbels and commissioner of the New York City Department of Commerce.	
Bennett Cerf	NY Alpha	1916	Publisher and co-founder of Random House, also known for his own compilations of jokes and puns, for regular personal appearances lecturing across the United States, and for his television appearances in the panel game show What's My Line?.	
Thomas M. Cole	NY Delta	1940	President of the Federal Pacific Electric Company and holder of over 70 patents.	
Mark Cuban	PA Gamma Sigma	1976	Founded Audionet (later became Broadcast.com), current owner Dallas Mavericks	
Jack Dreyfus	PA Lambda	1931	Financial expert and the founder of the Dreyfus Funds. He is widely publicized for being the man who "invented" the commonplace mutual fund through direct marketing to the public.	
Simon Fabian	NY Gamma		President of Fabian Theaters and Fabian Enterprises, the company that bought the Warner Brothers theaters as a result of the United States v. Paramount Pictures, Inc. antitrust case.	
Leon Falk Jr.	CT Iota	1922	Chairman of the Board of Weirton Steel from 1948 to 1952, executive director of National Steel's executive committee. Trustee of the University of Pittsburgh for 44 years. He was a longtime official of the Jewish Joint Distribution Committee and of other overseas relief agencies. He was active in helping Jews escape Nazi Germany and worked with Rafael Trujillo to establish a Jewish colony in the Dominican Republic in the 1930s.	
Max Fisher	OH Alpha Epsilon	1930	Businessman, philanthropist, and benefactor/alumnus of the Fisher College of Business at Ohio State University. He was also the subject of articles, debates, TV documentaries, and a biography, entitled "Quiet Diplomat" by Peter Golden. For decades, Fisher also served as a trusted advisor to United States presidents and Israeli prime ministers. By quietly forging new ties between Washington and Jerusalem, Fisher pioneered a new era in Jewish activism and politics and was considered the elder statesman of North Jewry.	
Ronald M. Freeman	PA Lambda	1957	CEO and vice chairman at Schroder Salomon Smith Barney International from 1997 to 2000. From 1991 to 1997, he was the first vice president, head of banking at the European Bank for Reconstruction and Development. He was the chief executive officer at Lipper International. Mr. Freeman is a senior advisor to the World Economic Forum and a member of the Columbia University Law School International Institute. He is currently the co-treasurer and co-chair of the Development and Finance Committee of the Atlantic Council of the United States board of directors. Mr. Freeman was granted an Order of Friendship (Orden Dostyk) by President Nursultan Nazarbayev and the Cabinet of Kazakhstan.	
Harold Gaba	CA Tau	1964	CEO and president of Act III Communications Holdings, L.P., a United States film production company founded in partnership with Norman Lear. In 1999, Lear and Gaba became co-owners of Concord Records, which was founded as a small jazz label in Concord, California in 1973.	
David Garth	PA Omega Kappa	1949	A political media consultant considered to be one of the godfathers of the trade. He helped elect four New York City Mayors, John Lindsay, Ed Koch, Rudy Giuliani and Michael Bloomberg. His other clients included Govs. Hugh L. Carey of New York, Ella T. Grasso of Connecticut and Brendan T. Byrne of New Jersey; Senators Arlen Specter and John Heinz of Pennsylvania; Mayor Tom Bradley of Los Angeles and Senator Al Gore's underfunded New York presidential campaign primary.	
Adi Godrej	MA Theta	1960	Chairman of multibillion-dollar Indian conglomerate, the Godrej Group.	
Nelson L. Goldberg	PA Omega Gamma	1951	Telecommunications pioneer, developed first cable system acquired by Comcast, NFL Agent.	
Hal Halpin	FL Delta Upsilon	1989	Computer game executive and entrepreneur, and is the president and founder of the Entertainment Consumers Association (ECA). He is perhaps best known as the founder of the video game industry's retail trade association Interactive Entertainment Merchants Association (IEMA) that merged with Video Software Dealers Association (VSDA) to form Entertainment Merchants Association (EMA).	
Larry Hochberg	WI Omega	1955	Pioneer in the superstore format he co-founded Children's Bargain Town that eventually became Toys R Us. He also founded Sportmart, the first superstore in the sporting goods category. Sportmart eventually merged with Gart Sports that eventually merged with Sports Authority.	
Milton Kutsher	PA Epsilon Zeta	1925	Head of Kutsher's Hotel, founder of Kutsher's Sports Academy and creator of the Maurice Stokes Basketball Game. It is said that the hotel served as the inspiration for the 1987 movie Dirty Dancing. He was a trustee of the Basketball Hall of Fame.	
Joseph Shorin	NY Gamma	1923	Co-founder of the Topps company, manufacturers of chewing gum, candy and collectibles. Topps introduced Bazooka along with the character Bazooka Joe, and they were one of the creators of the "modern" baseball card.	
Jonathan Spira	PA Epsilon Zeta	1981	Researcher and industry analyst known for his work in the area of collaboration and knowledge sharing and the problem of information overload. Spira is the author of Overload! How Too Much Information Is Bad For Your Organization	
Bernie Stolar	CA Upsilon	1968	Businessman who worked in the video game industry for several important companies. His career started at Atari, where he worked initially in the coin-op arcade division and eventually moved over to the home division in charge of platforms like Atari Lynx. Stolar became the first executive vice president of Sony Computer Entertainment America, where he launched the Sony PlayStation platform. He later joined Sega, where he released the Dreamcast.	
Chuck Steinmetz	FL Delta	1958	Entomologist and entrepreneur, he developed a new and innovative formula for the delivery of a safe, effective, and convenient once-a-year pest control service. He founded All America Termite & Pest Control in 1982 and grew it to $120M in sales before he sold it to Sears in 1997.	
William J. Weisz	MA Theta	1944	Motorola president in 1970, COO in 1972, CEO from 1986 to 1988, and chairman of the board from 1993 to 1997. Awarded the IEEE Ernst Weber Engineering Leadership Recognition in 1997.	
William Zeckendorf	NY Gamma	1925	Real estate developer who developed much of the New York City urban landscape through his development company Webb and Knapp	

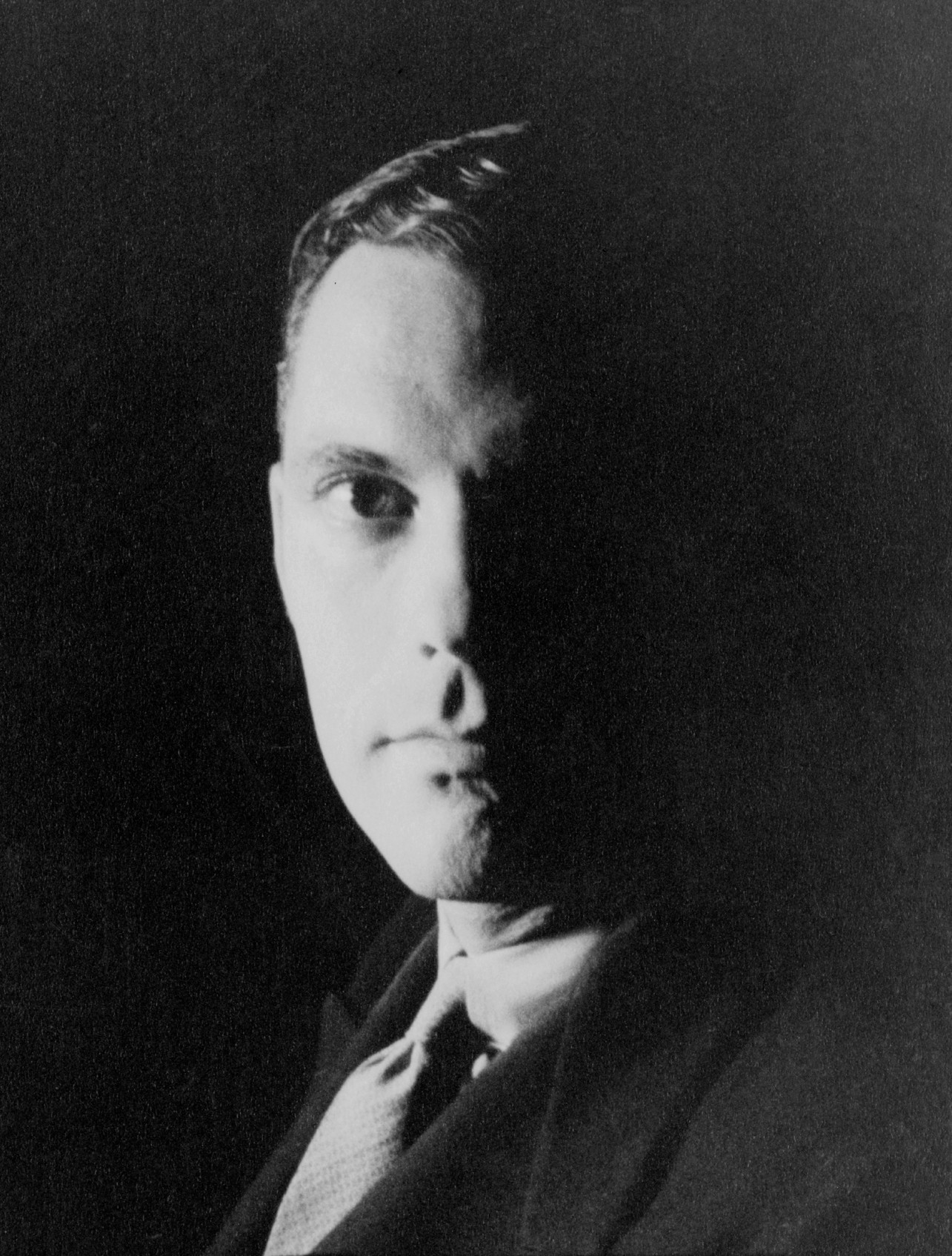
Bennett Cerf

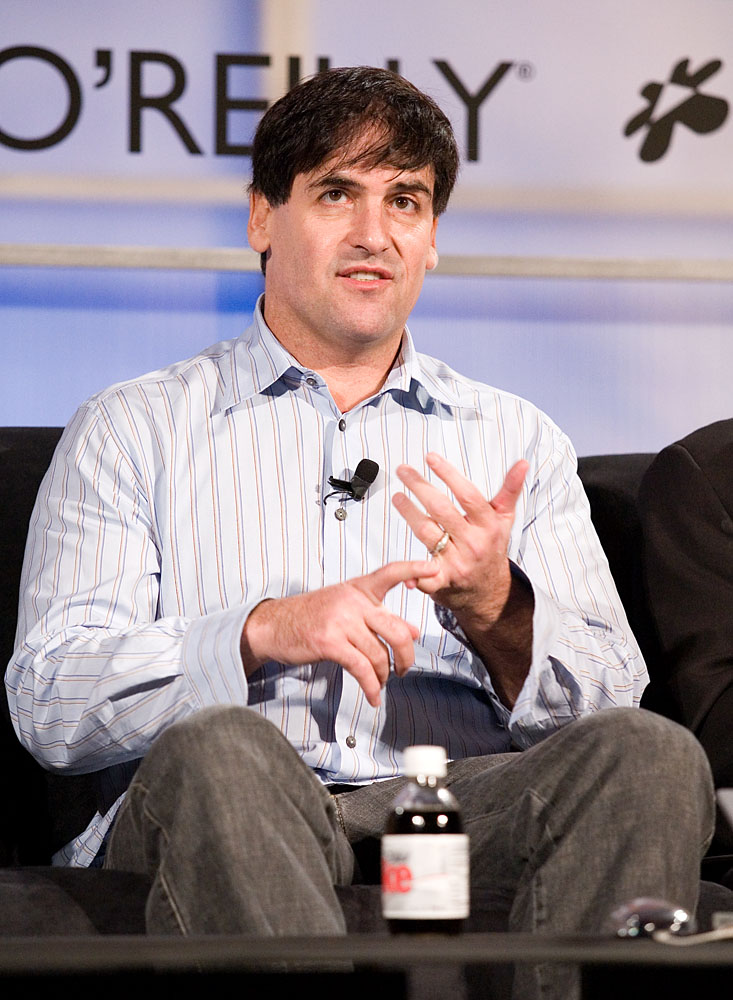
Mark Cuban

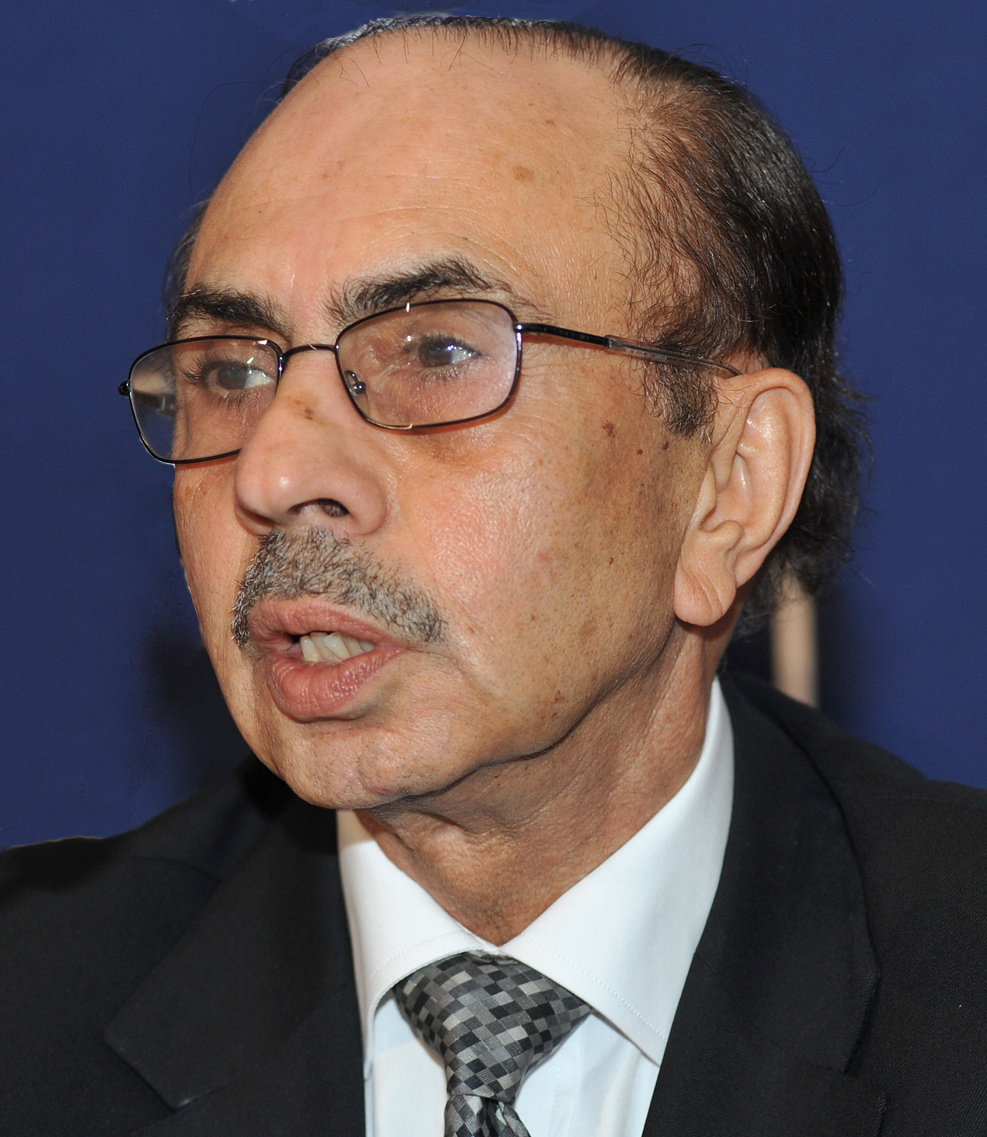
Adi Godrej

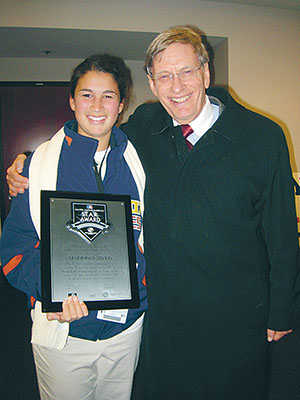
Bud Selig

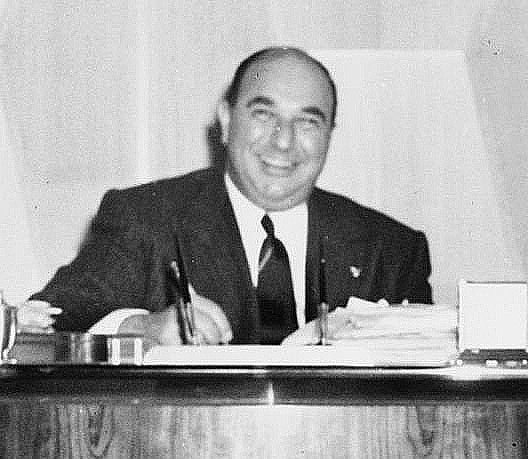
William Zeckendorf

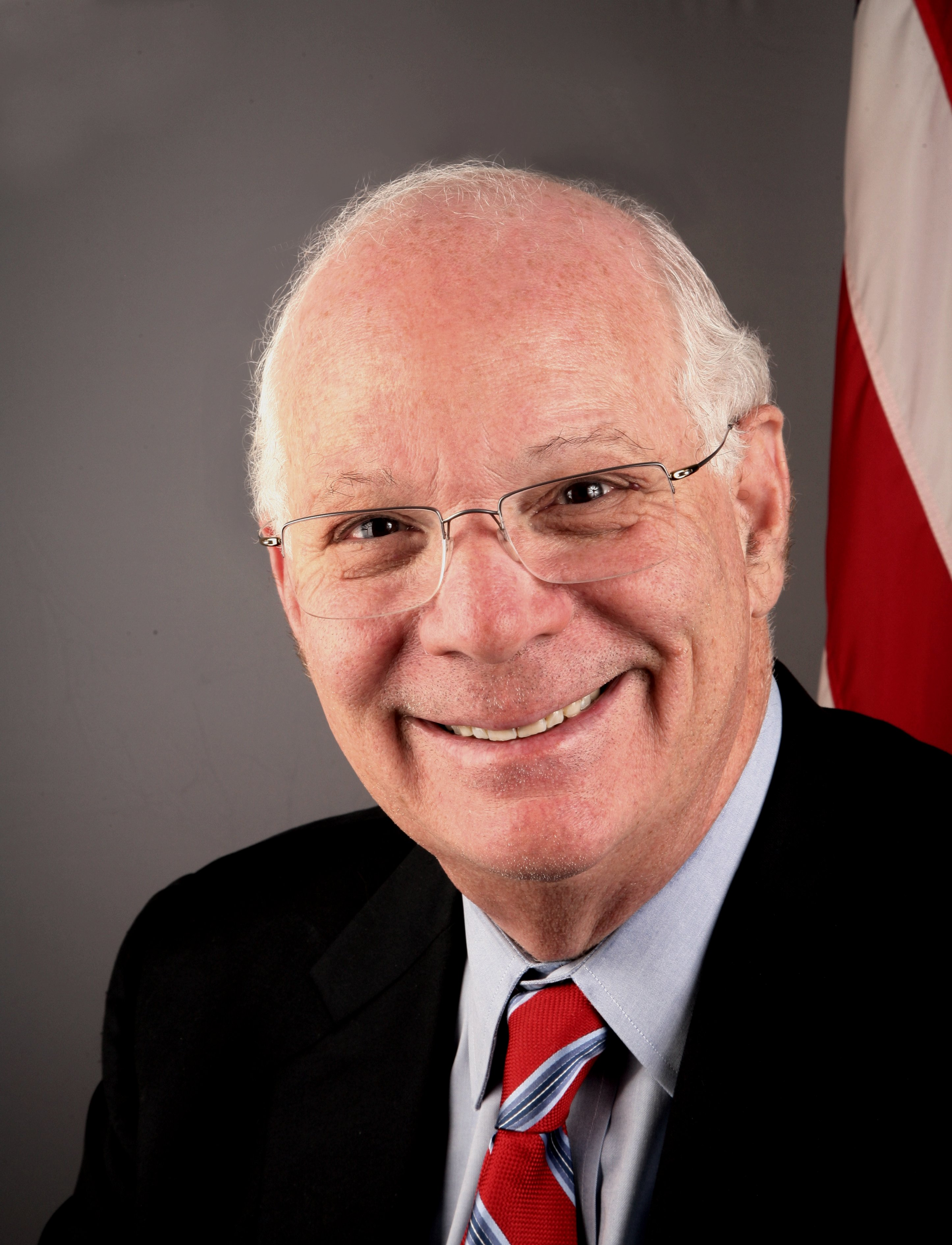
Ben Cardin

== Entertainment ==
=== Film and television ===
Name	Original chapter	Initiation year	Notability	References
Norm Abram	MA Kappa Nu	1971	Carpenter on the PBS shows This Old House and The New Yankee Workshop.	
Elliot Abrams	PA Omega Gamma	1966	AccuWeather Chief Forecaster, known as "America's Wittiest Weatherman", is one of only a few living persons who have earned both the title of Certified Consulting Meteorologist and the AMS Seals of Approval for both radio and television from the Meteorological Society.	
Lewis Black	NC Omega Beta	1968	Grammy award-winning stand-up comedian, author, playwright and actor. He hosted Comedy Central's Root of All Evil and is the author of Me of Little Faith.	
Howard Cosell	NY Gamma	1936	Sports journalist and for a time a member of the ABC Monday Night Football crew.	
Barry Farber	NC Omega Beta	1949	conservative radio talk show host, author and language-learning enthusiast. He is the author of Making People Talk: You Can Turn Every Conversation into a Magic Moment, How to Learn Any Language: Quickly, Easily, Inexpensively, Enjoyably and on Your Own and How to Not Make the Same Mistake Once. He has also written articles appearing in The New York Times, Reader's Digest, The Washington Post, and the Saturday Review.	
James Ferman	NY Delta	1948	Television and theatre director. He was the secretary (later termed director) of the British Board of Film Classification from 1975 to 1999.	
Kevin James	NY Kappa Gamma	1985	Comedian, actor, writer, and producer, lead character on the CBS sitcom The King of Queens.	
Stanley Kramer	NY Gamma	1933	Academy Award-nominated film director and producer, Inherit The Wind, Guess Who's Coming to Dinner, winner Irving G. Thalberg Memorial Award.	
Albert Lewin	NY Gamma	1915?	Film director, producer, and screenwriter. Lewin was appointed head of the MGM studio's script department and by his late 20s was Irving Thalberg's personal assistant and closest associate. Producing credits during this period include True Confession (1937), Spawn of the North (1938), Zaza (1939), and So Ends Our Night (1941). In the early 1940s, he formed an independent production company with David Loew and Stanley Kramer.	
David Loew	NY Gamma	1915	Film producer. He and his brother Arthur Loew were the twin sons of MGM founder Marcus Loew. After being elected to the board of directors of Loew's, Inc., in 1922, he resigned from the studio in 1935 to launch an independent production career. In the early 1940s, he formed an independent production company with Albert Lewin and Stanley Kramer.	
Abby Mann	PA Alpha Delta	1946	Film writer and producer best known for his work on controversial subjects and social drama. His most famous work is the drama Judgment at Nuremberg, which was initially a television drama aired in 1959. Stanley Kramer directed the 1961 film adaptation, for which Mann received the Academy Award for Best Adapted Screenplay. He created the television series Kojak, starring Telly Savalas. Mann was executive producer, but was credited as a writer also on many episodes.	
Michael Mann	WI Omega	1961	Academy Award-nominated & Emmy Award-winning film director, screenwriter, and producer, The Last of the Mohicans, The Aviator.	
Louis B. Mayer	CA Kappa		(1884–1957) was a Russian-born film producer. He is generally cited as the creator of the "star system" within Metro-Goldwyn-Mayer (MGM) in its golden years. Known always as Louis B. Mayer and often simply as "L.B.", he believed in wholesome entertainment and went to great lengths so that MGM had "more stars than there are in the heavens".	
Michael Piller	NC Omega Beta	1967	Television scriptwriter and producer, who was most famous for his contributions to the Star Trek franchise.	
Budd Schulberg	NH Pi	1933	Screenwriter, television producer, novelist and sports writer. He wrote What Makes Sammy Run?, The Harder They Fall, and the 1954 Academy Award-winning screenplay for On the Waterfront. He has also been a sports writer and a chief boxing correspondent for Sports Illustrated and was inducted into the International Boxing Hall of Fame in 2002 in recognition of his contributions to the sport.	
Shepard Traube	PA Eta		Film director and Broadway producer and director. Noted works were the film Hitler, Beast of Berlin based on his novel, Goose Steps and the play he directed, The Patriots. He was added to the Hollywood Blacklist in 1950.	

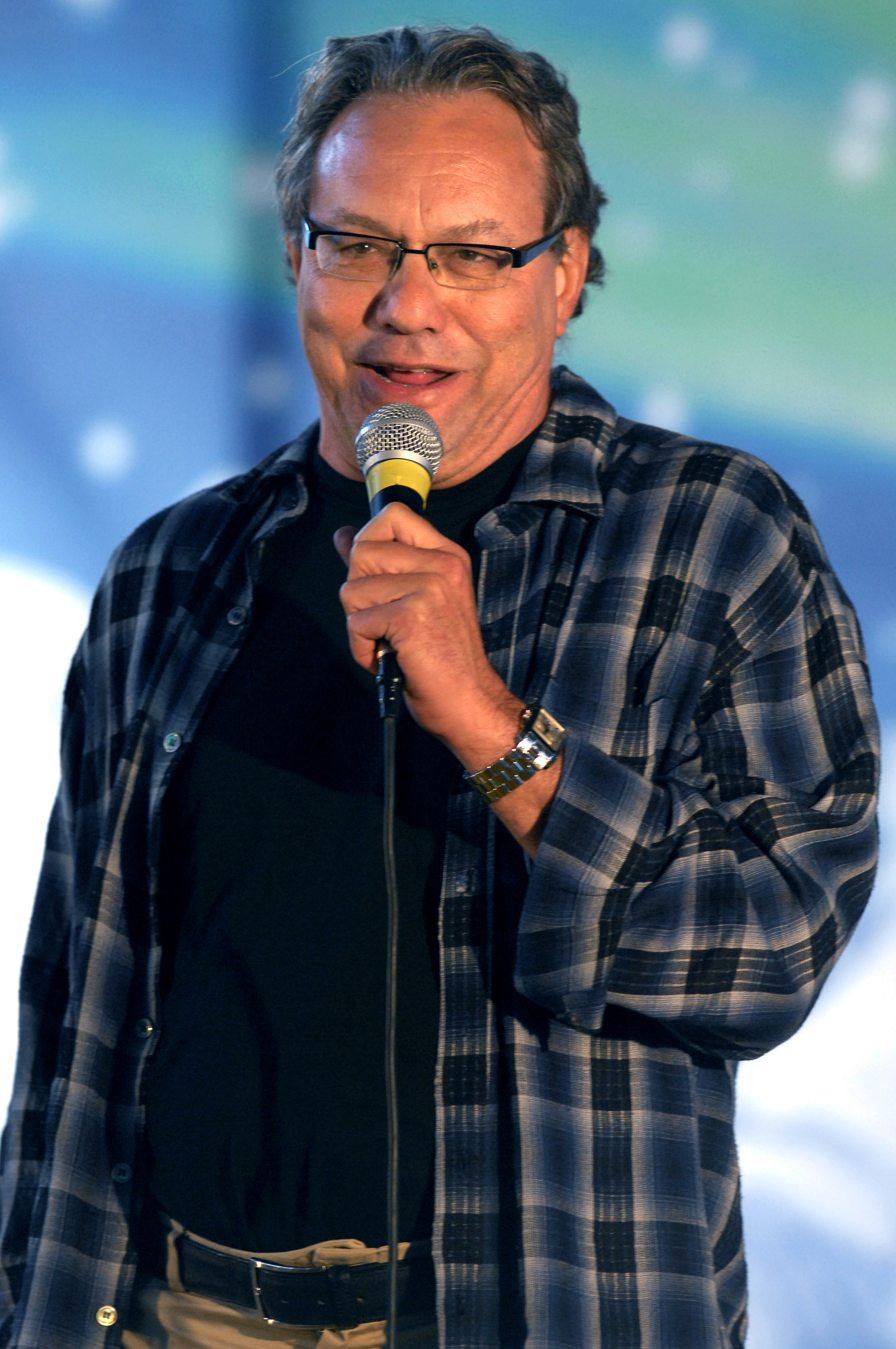
Lewis Black

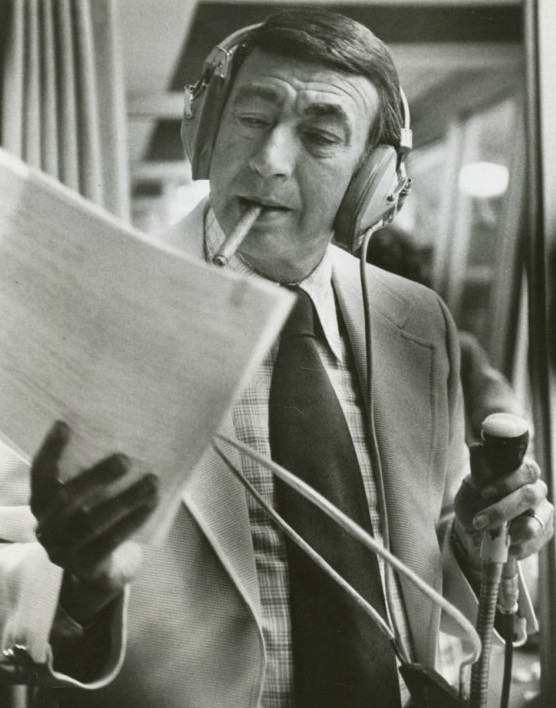
Howard Cosell

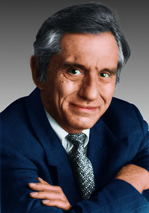
Barry Farber

Stanley Kramer

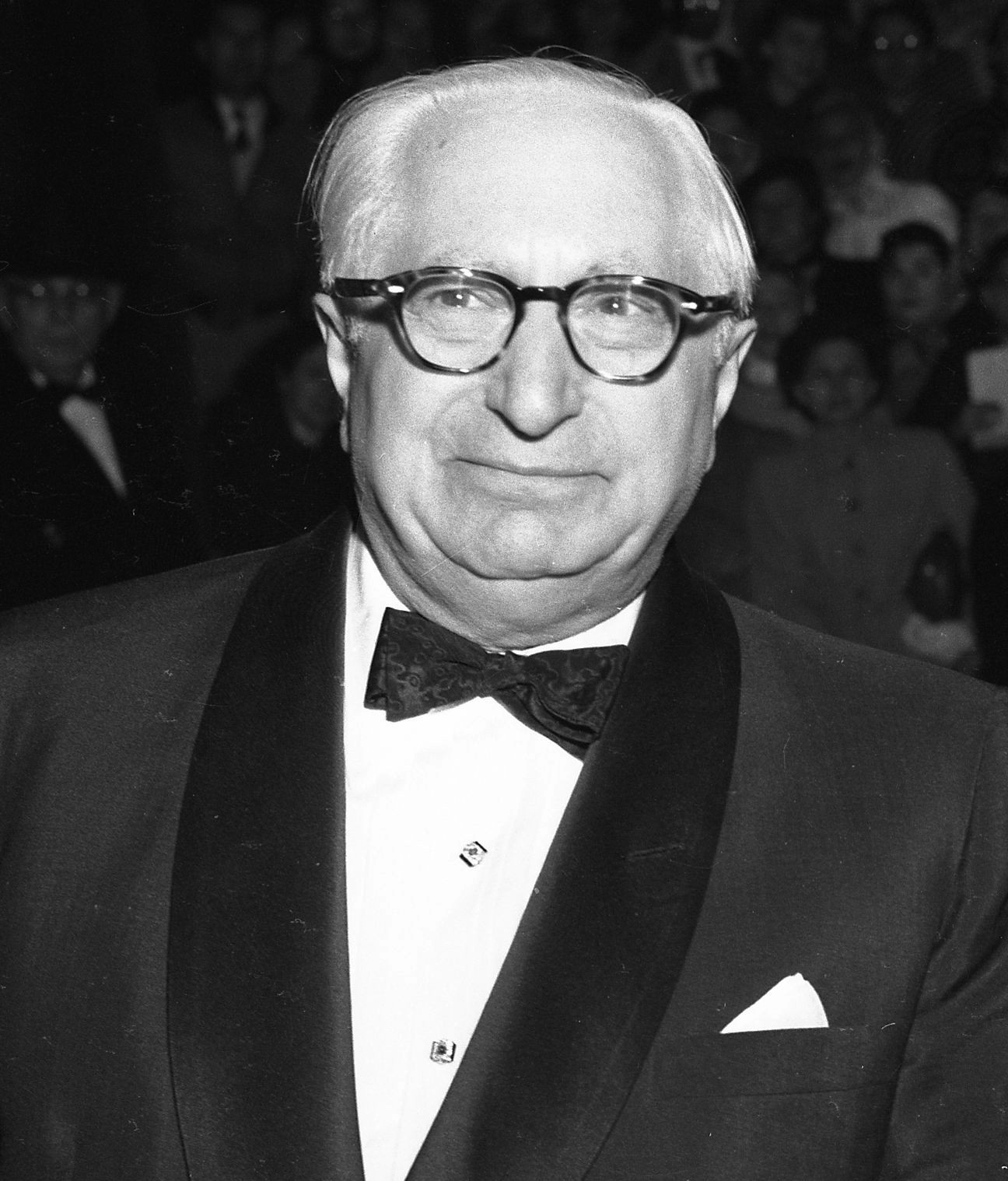
Louis B. Mayer

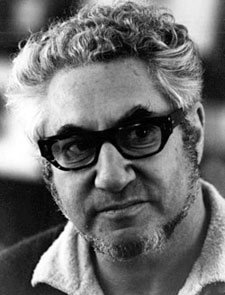
Budd Schulberg

=== Music ===
Name	Original chapter	Initiation year	Notability	References
Ray Evans	PA Epsilon Zeta	1936	Three-time Academy Award-winning songwriter. He was a partner in a composing and songwriting duo with Jay Livingston, known for the songs they composed for films and television. Evans wrote the lyrics and Livingston the music for the songs. He is the author of the Christmas standard Silver Bells.	
Oscar Hammerstein II	NY Alpha	1914	Academy Award and Tony Award-winning songwriter, theater producer. Works include Oklahoma!, Sound of Music, South Pacific (musical) and The King and I.	
Walter Kahn	PA Alpha Delta	1970	American DJ and record producer. Kahn began his music career as a Top 40 radio DJ. His early music productions include “Loves Me Like A Rock," written by Paul Simon and performed by The Dixie Hummingbirds, for which he was awarded a Grammy. He had an impressive catalog of music and produced artists for most of the major record labels.	
Elliot Lawrence	PA Epsilon Zeta	1943	Jazz pianist and bandleader. He recorded copiously as a bandleader for Columbia, Decca, King, Fantasy, Vik, and Sesac between 1946 and 1960. After 1960, Lawrence gave up jazz and began composing and arranging for television, film, and stage. He won two Tony Awards in 1961 and 1962.	
Enoch Light	MD Rho	1925	Classical violinist, bandleader, & recording engineer. Credited with being one of the first musicians to create high-quality recordings & stereo effects in the 1950s & early 1960s.	
Richard Rodgers	NY Alpha	1919	Composer of music for more than 900 songs and for 43 Broadway musicals. One of only two people to have won an Oscar, a Grammy, an Emmy, a Tony Award, and a Pulitzer Prize. Works include Oklahoma!, Sound of Music, South Pacific (musical) and The King and I	
Arthur Schwartz	NY Gamma	1918	Composer and film producer. Among his Broadway musicals are The Band Wagon, The Gay Life, A Tree Grows in Brooklyn, Jennie, and By the Beautiful Sea. His films include the MGM musical The Band Wagon with lyricist Howard Dietz. He worked for Columbia Pictures as a producer, his work including the 1944 musical Cover Girl. His son Jonathan is a popular radio personality and sometimes musician. His son Paul Schwartz is a composer, conductor, pianist, and producer.	
Vivek Tiwary	PA Zeta	1996	Award-winning producer who brought punk to Broadway. Vivek started out working for well-known music labels including Mercury/PolyGram, MTV, and VH1. In 2004, he produced his first Broadway play, A Raisin In The Sun, and in turn established the Tiwary Entertainment Group. And the hits kept coming. He produced and financed such groundbreaking work as The Addams Family, A Little Night Music, and both of Mel Brooks’ musicals The Producers and Young Frankenstein.	
Jack Yellen	MI Epsilon	1913	lyricist and screenwriter who wrote the lyrics to more than 200 popular songs of the early 20th century. Two of his most recognized songs, still popular in the 21st century, are "Happy Days Are Here Again" and "Ain't She Sweet." Yellen's screenwriting credits included George White's Scandals, Pigskin Parade, Little Miss Broadway, and Submarine Patrol. He was inducted into the Songwriters Hall of Fame in 1972. He wrote the Pi Lambda Phi song, "Brother Mine Forever".	

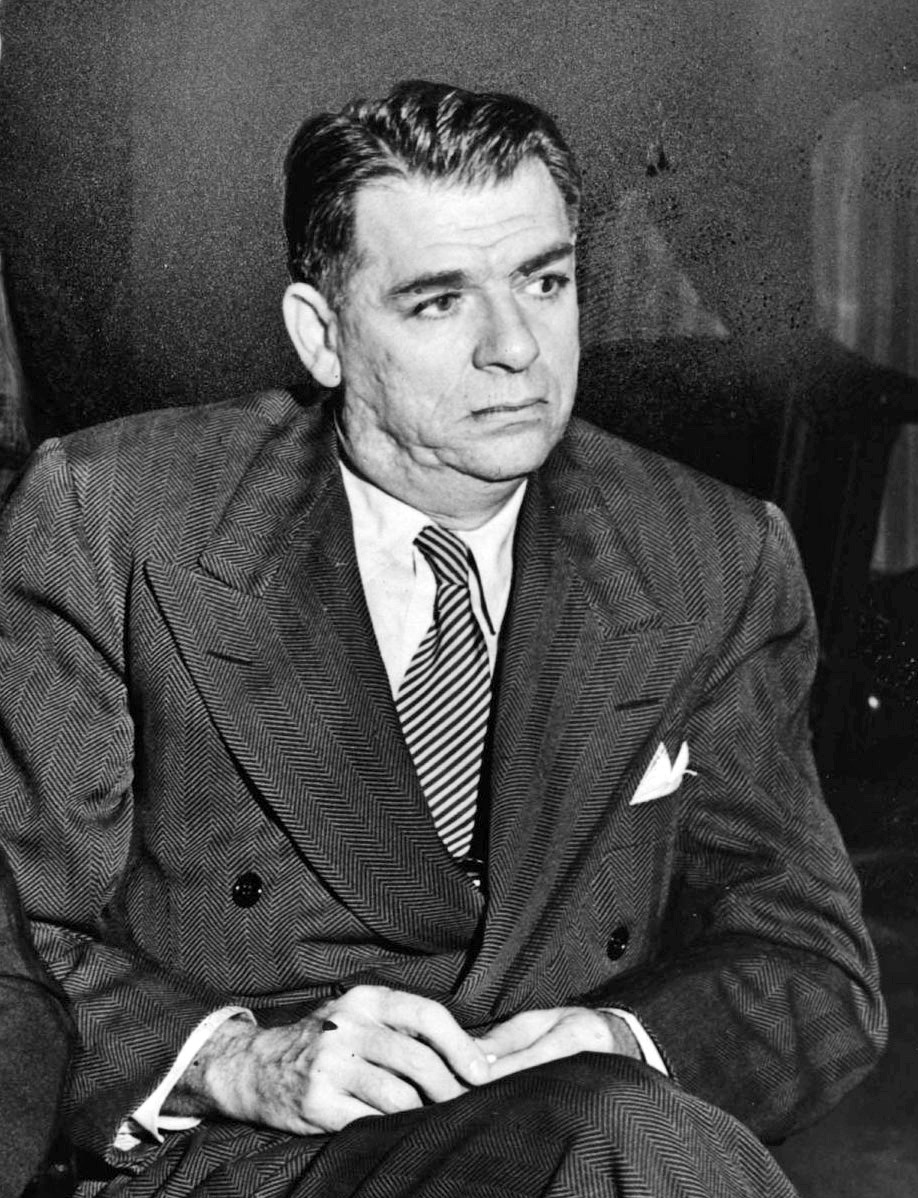
Oscar Hammerstein II

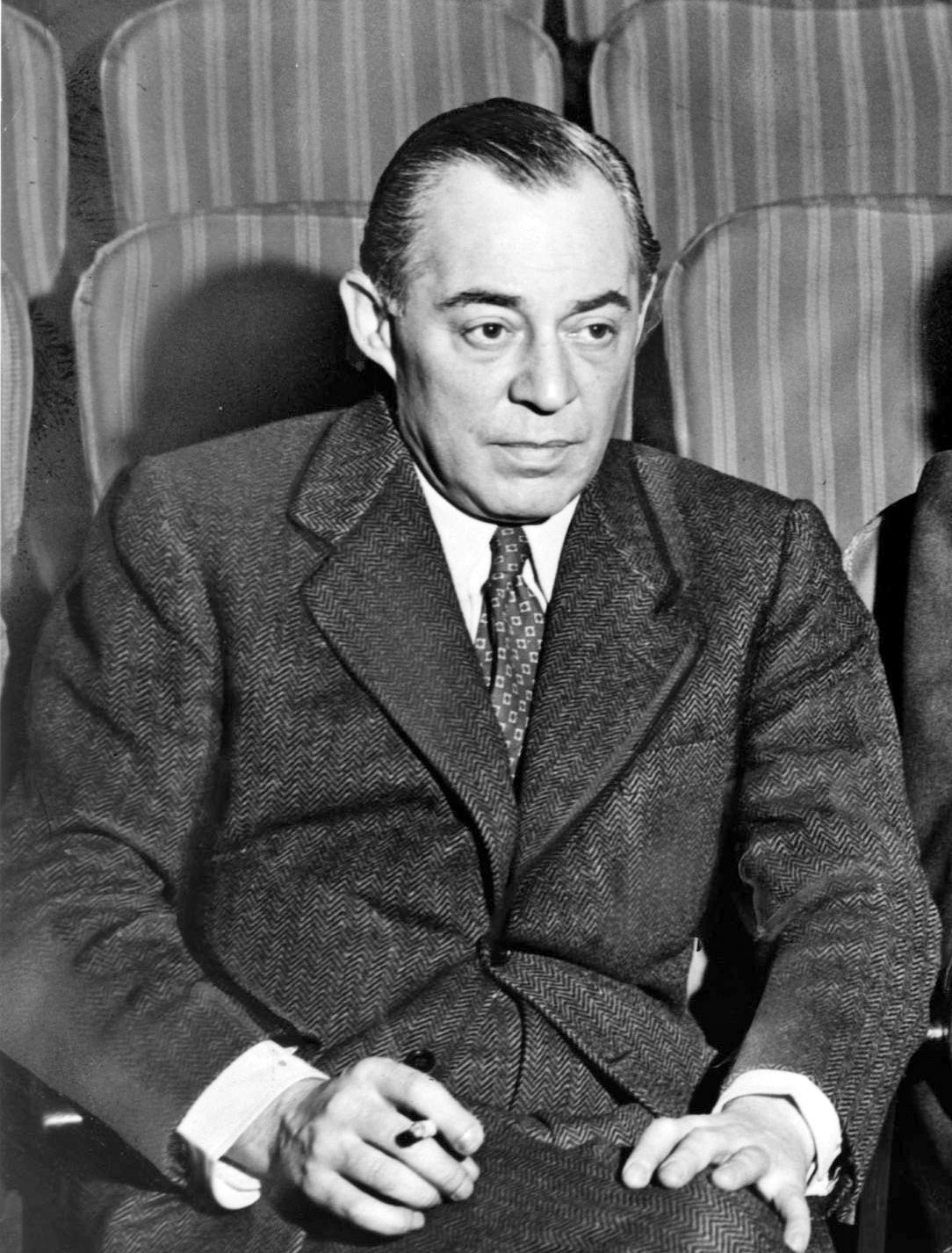
Richard Rodgers

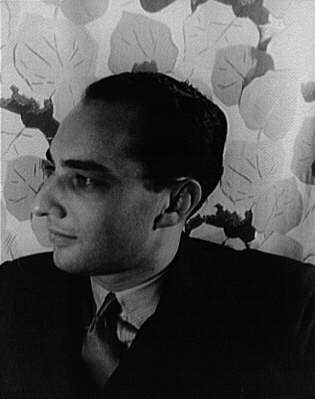
Arthur Schwartz

== Law ==
Name	Original chapter	Initiation year	Notability	Ref(s)
Alvin Cassel	FL Delta	1934	an attorney and founder of the law firm Broad and Cassel. He was appointed by President Lyndon Johnson in 1964 as director of the Economic Opportunity Program Inc., the Miami Chapter of the War on Poverty, Head Start, and Small Business Advisory.	
Raymond Ehrlich	FL Delta	1936	(b. 1918 – d. July 12, 2005). Ehrlich was a justice of the Florida Supreme Court. He was a judge from the U.S. state of Florida. Raymond Ehrlich served as a Florida Supreme Court Justice from 1981 to 1990. From 1988 to 1990, he served as Chief Justice.	
David Ginsburg	WV Mu	1929	An attorney whose career lasted 70 years and began with the Securities and Exchange Commission, a role he obtained with help from his mentor, United States Supreme Court justice Felix Frankfurter. He clerked for Justice William O. Douglas at the Supreme Court. In 1941, he became general counsel to the Office of Price Administration and Civilian Supply, where he also hired Richard Nixon. He was a founding member of Americans for Democratic Action. He attended the Potsdam Conference and the Nuremberg Trials. As counsel to the Jewish Agency's office in Washington, he was part of an inner circle of advisers to the Zionist leader Chaim Weizmann and helped smooth the way to the Truman administration's recognition of the new state of Israel. In the 1968 Kerner Commission Report, Ginsburg wrote the famous statement: "Our nation is moving toward two societies, one black, one white — separate and unequal." In 1981, he argued successfully on behalf of Henry Kissinger before the U.S. Supreme Court. Throughout his extensive career,r he worked with or on assignments for Franklin Roosevelt, Harry Truman, John F. Kennedy, Lyndon Johnson and Richard Nixon.	
Arthur Garfield Hays	NY Alpha	1901	Was a General Counsel Civil Liberties Union who worked on the Scopes Trial, Scottsboro Case, and Reichstag Trial. Died, 1954	
Edwin Goodman	CN Tau Alpha	1940	was a Canadian lawyer and political figure known for his political work as an advisor and fundraiser for both the Progressive Conservative Party of Canada and particularly the Progressive Conservative Party of Ontario, having been a friend and advisor to both Premier John Robarts and Premier Bill Davis. He was Queen's Privy Council for Canada, Order of Canada, Queen's Counsel	
Sylvan Gotshal	NY Alpha	1917	(1897–1968) noted textile industry attorney, founding member of Weil, Gotshal & Manges, was counsel to the Council of Style and Design, Textile Distributors Institute and a representative of the Chambre Syndicale de la Couture. He co-authored the book The Pirates Will Get You and drew up a number of codes for the National Recovery Administration in the first Administration of Franklin D. Roosevelt. He was a president of the Arbitration Association and president of the United Jewish Appeal of Greater New York. His decorations included the Star of Italian Solidarity, Vatican Medal, Officer of the French Legion of Honor and the Israel Award of Merit.	
Nathan Jacobs	PA Epsilon Zeta	1925	(died Jan. 25, 1989) New Jersey Governor Alfred E. Driscoll appointed him to the New Jersey Supreme Court in 1948. Later that year, Chief Justice Arthur T. Vanderbilt named him senior judge of the New Jersey Superior Court, Appellate Division, a post he held for four years until Governor Driscoll named him to the Supreme Court again. He served there until his retirement in 1975. Justice Jacobs was a protege and longtime associate of the Chief Justice Arthur T. Vanderbilt, who assumed the state's top judicial post after the 1947 constitutional convention that formulated the present New Jersey court system. The two men were major forces in the revamping of the court system and were guiding personalities on the courts in the ensuing decades.	
Theodore W. Kheel	NY Delta	1935	one of America's most distinguished professional mediators and one of New York City's most influential public advocates. He started in private practice and joined the National Labor Relations Board and eventually served as the executive director of the National War Labor Board. He served as president of the Urban League. He mediated numerous labor disputes and would ultimately serve as a mediator and advisor for virtually every New York City mayor from William O'Dwyer to Abraham Beame, for the Kennedy-Johnson Administration and other presidential administrations as well. The Kheel Center for Labor Management Documentation and Archives is named for him, and he is also the author of The Keys to Conflict Resolution.	
Fred Levin	FL Delta	1955	plaintiffs' attorney in the state of Florida. The Fredric G. Levin College of Law at the University of Florida is named for him. He is best known for spearheading Florida's 1998 class-action lawsuit against the tobacco, the first state to file a suit with the tobacco businesses. The Associated Press has referred to Levin as "one of the nation's most successful civil trial lawyers."	
Horace Manges	NY Alpha	1913	(1899–1986) an authority on copyright law, founding member of Weil, Gotshal & Manges, was counsel to the Book Publishers' Council from 1953 to 1970 and over the years represented several publishers, including Random House, Scribner's, Harper & Row, Dial Press and Little, Brown & Company. He also represented many authors, including William Faulkner, John O'Hara, Truman Capote, Whitaker Chambers and James Jones. He appeared several times before Congressional committees or argued before the United States Supreme Court on behalf of publishers or authors facing censorship attempts. He was a vice president and trustee of the Copyright Society of the U.S.A. and consultant to the Librarian of Congress on general revision of copyright law.	
Arthur Markewich	NY Delta	1926	elected to the Supreme Court, 1st Judicial District. Governor Nelson Rockefeller, in 1969, appointed Markewich to the Appellate Division First Department, where he remained until 1982. He was the justice presiding over the panel of Appellate Division judges that disbarred Richard M. Nixon in New York State after Mr. Nixon's resignation as President in 1974 after the Watergate scandal.	
Leigh Steinberg	CA Upsilon	1968	Sports agent and well-known sports attorney. Steinberg is often credited as the real-life inspiration for the sports agent in the film Jerry Maguire.	

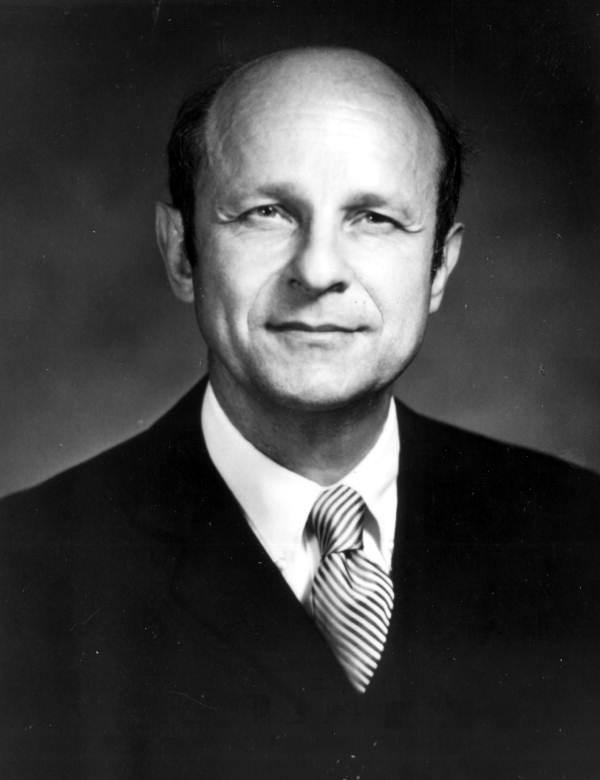
Raymond Ehrlich

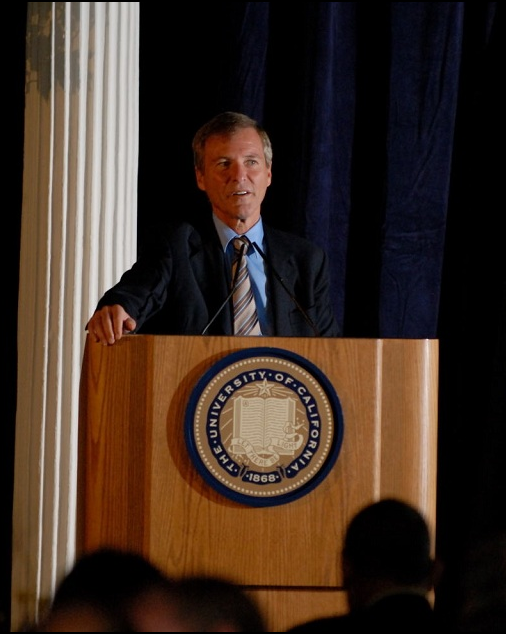
Leigh Steinberg

== Literature and journalism ==
Name	Original chapter	Initiation year	Notability	Ref(s)
Lawrence Fertig	NY Alpha	1919	libertarian journalist and economic commentator. Fertig wrote columns for the New York World-Telegram and The Sun. Fertig also wrote the 1961 Regnery Press offering, Prosperity Through Freedom.	
Bernard Goldhirsh	MA Theta	1958	Founder of the magazines, Sail, High Technology, and Inc.	
Clifford Irving	NY Delta	1948	(b. 1930) is an author of several novels and works of nonfiction beginning with, On a Darkling Plain in 1956 to his most recent, I Remember Amnesia in 2004. He is best known for using forged handwritten letters to convince his publisher to accept a fake "autobiography" of reclusive businessman Howard Hughes in the early 1970s. The 2005 film The Hoax stars Richard Gere as Irving and is based on Clifford's book, The Hoax.	
Moritz A. Jagendorf	NY Alpha	1909	was a noted anarchist, folklorist, author and dentist. He wrote for Hippolyte Havel's Revolt and co-edited The Road to Freedom with Harry Kelly and wrote the books Tales Of Mystery: Folk Tales from Around the World and Folk Wines, Cordials & Brandies: How to Make Them, Along with the Pleasures of Their Lore. In an interview in 1978, he said, "The only progress is in the individual, in you yourself; and through progress you better the whole world. And that is as far as you can go. I said that in 1914 to Leonard Abbott and again in the 1920s and 1930s, and I still say it today."	
D. Herbert Lipson	PA Sigma	1948	Chairman of Metrocorp, a media conglomerate in Philadelphia that publishes lifestyle magazines in numerous regions across the United States, including Boston Magazine and Philadelphia Magazine. The latter has won numerous National Magazine Awards. He and his founding editor Alan Halpern are credited with inventing the city magazine format in Philadelphia in the early 1960s.	
Dan Senor	CN Kappa Iota	1990	Contributor to Fox News, MSNBC, frequent contributor to The Wall Street Journal, and co-author of Start-up Nation: The Story of Israel's Economic Miracle written with Saul Singer, about the economy of Israel and globalization in the Middle East. He is best known as chief spokesperson for the Coalition Provisional Authority while in Iraq.	
Herman Wouk	NY Alpha	1932	Pulitzer Prize-winning author whose novels include The Caine Mutiny, The Winds of War, and War and Remembrance.	
Jeffrey Zaslow	PA Beta Zeta	1977	Journalist and a columnist for The Wall Street Journal. He is the co-author of The Last Lecture with Randy Pausch and Highest Duty: My Search for What Really Matters with Chesley Sullenberger, and the author of The Girls from Ames. While working at the Chicago Sun-Times, he received the Will Rogers Humanitarian Award. Zaslow was honored for using his column to run programs that benefited 47,000 disadvantaged Chicago children.	

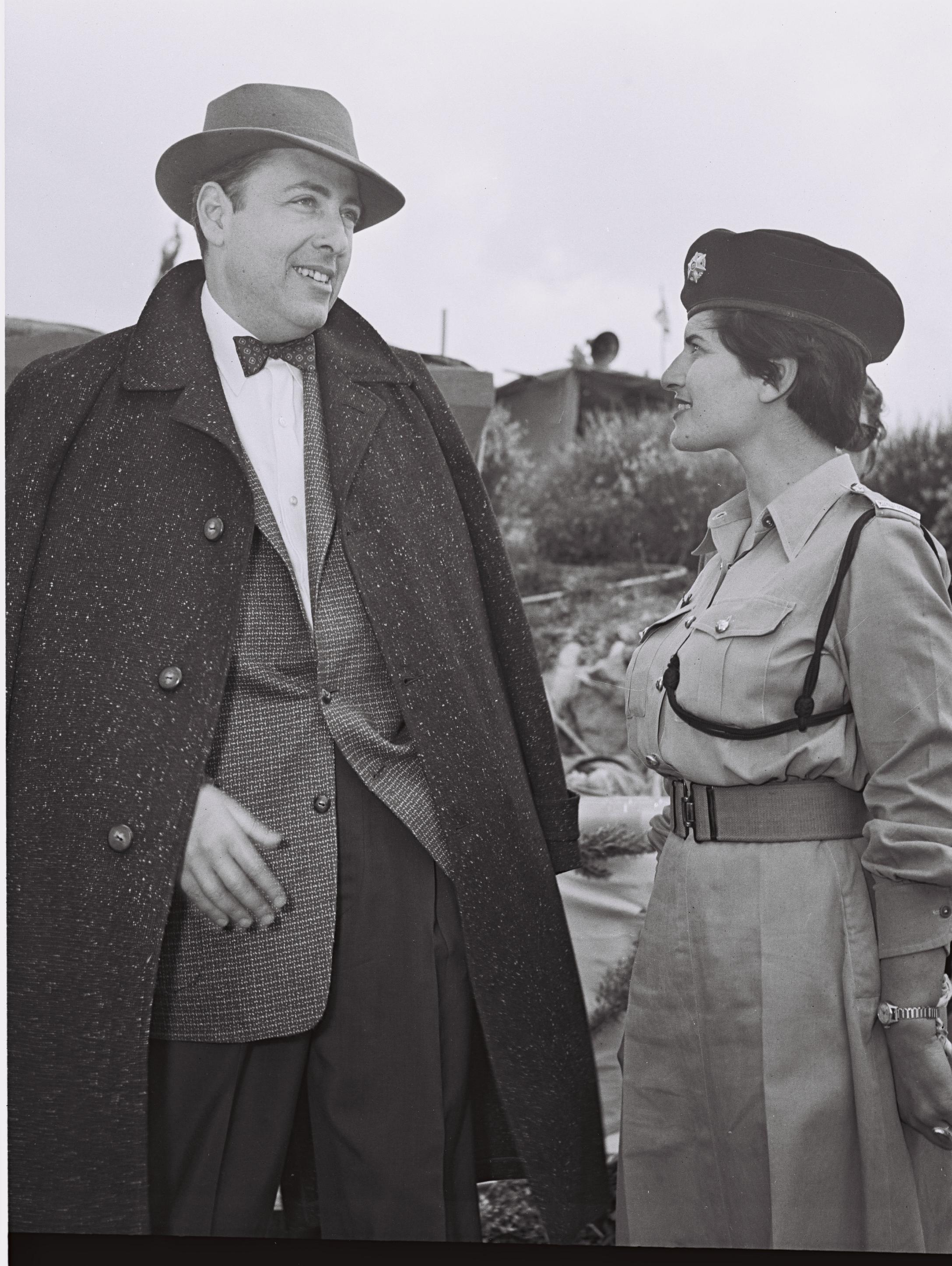
Herman Wouk

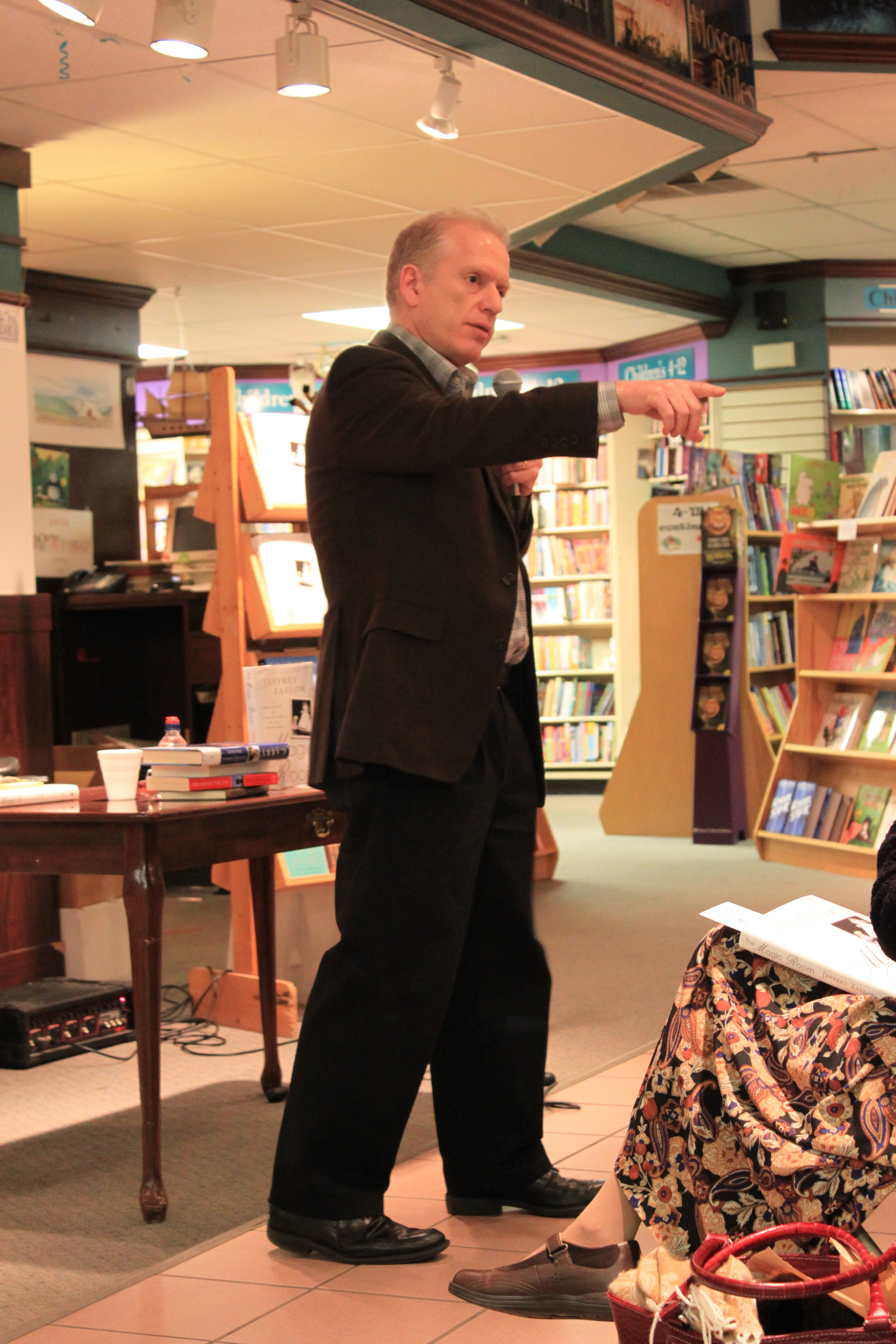
Jeffrey Zaslow

== Military ==
Name	Original chapter	Initiation year	Notability	Ref(s)
J. Timothy Riker	OH Beta Tau	1969	Retired Rear Admiral in the U.S. Coast Guard. In 30 years of service, he earned more than 25 medals, including the Coast Guard Distinguished Service Medal, Legion of Merit, and Meritorious Service Medal with Operational Distinguishing Device, and Gold Star.	
John Ogonowski	MA Alpha Epsilon	1970	Pilot in the U. S. Air Force during the Vietnam War, flying C-141 transport aircraft. He was piloting Airlines Flight 11 when it was hijacked and flown into the North Tower of the World Trade Center as part of the 9/11 attacks. A resident of Dracut, Massachusetts, Ogonowski was a leading figure on behalf of farming in Massachusetts, particularly for immigrant farmers from Cambodia, whom he assisted as part of the New Entry Sustainable Farming Project.	
James A. Zimble	PA Tau Omega	1952	Commissioned officer in the Medical Corps of the United States Navy. His Navy career spanned 35 years of service, beginning in 1956 at the rank of ensign and ending in 1991 at the rank of vice admiral. He served as the 30th Surgeon General of the United States Navy from 1987 to 1991. After retiring from the Navy in 1991, Zimble was appointed president of the Uniformed Services University of the Health Sciences in Bethesda, Maryland. He remained in that position until 2004. Honors and awards that Dr. Zimble has received during his 35 years serving the US Navy include the Surgeon General's Medallion, the Department of Defense Distinguished Service Medal, the US Navy Distinguished Service Medal, the Department of Defense Superior Service Medal, the Legion of Merit (three awards), the Department of Defense Meritorious Service Medal, and the Association of Military Surgeons of the United States Founder's Medal. He was president of the Uniformed Services University from 1991 to 2004.	

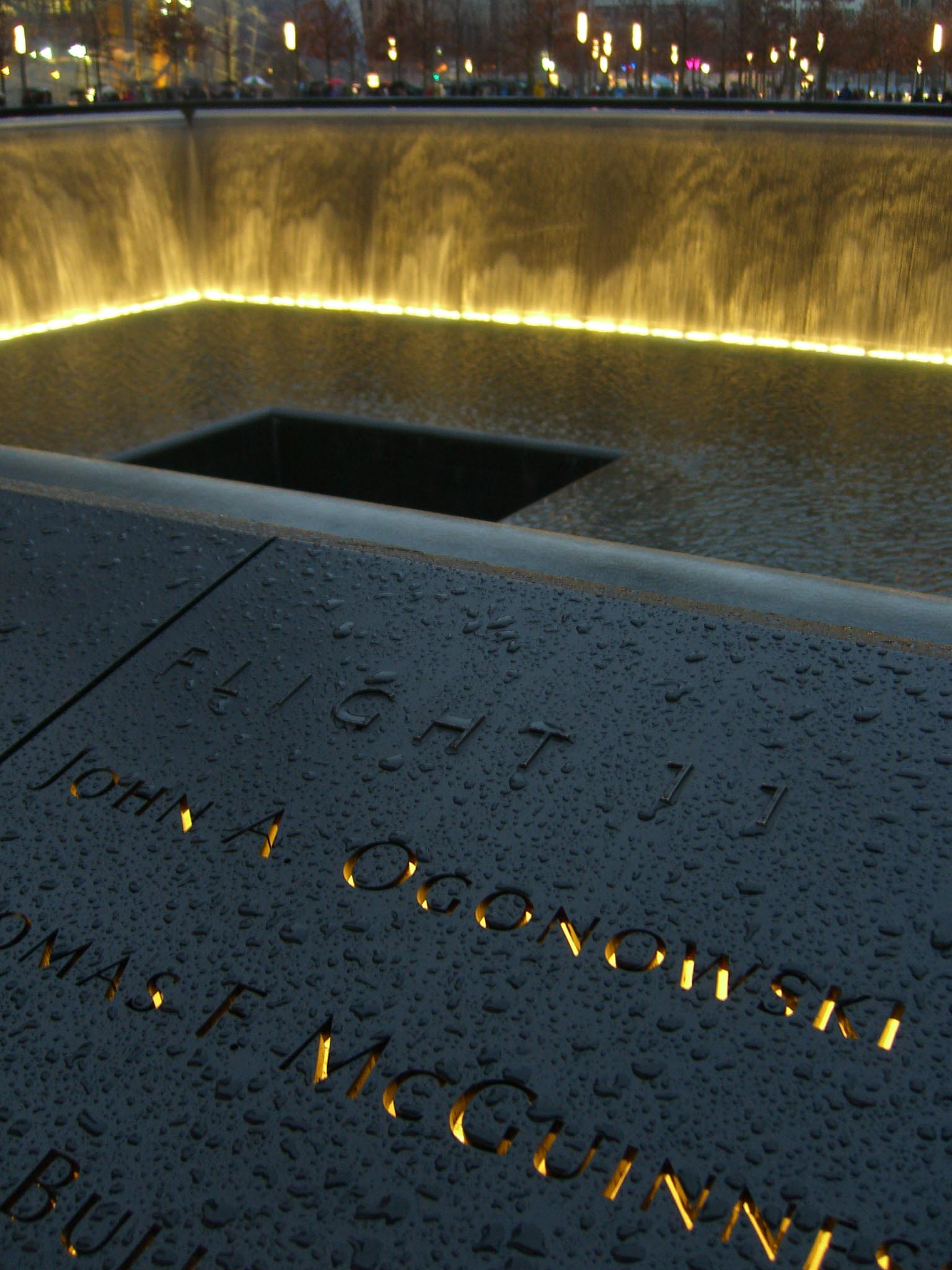
John Ogonowski

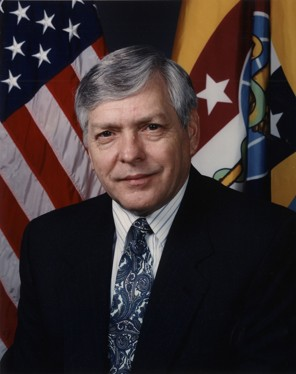
James A. Zimble

== Politics ==
=== U.S. Congress ===
Name	Original chapter	Initiation year	Notability	Ref(s)
Ben Cardin	PA Gamma Sigma	1961	U.S. Senator (D), Maryland	
Eliot Engel	NY Alpha Mu	1967	U.S. Representative (D), New York, 1989 to 2021.	
Herbert Kohl	WI Omega	1953	U.S. Senator (D), Wisconsin, from 1989 to 2013, owner of the Milwaukee Bucks (NBA)	
Arlen Specter	PA Epsilon Zeta	1948	U.S. Senator (D), Pennsylvania from 1980 to 2010. In 2006, he was selected by Time as one of America's Ten best senators. Died in 2012.	
Sidney R. Yates	IL Omicron	1927	U.S. Representative (D), 9th District, Illinois, from 1949 to 1963 and 1965 to 1999. Presented with the Presidential Citizens Medal by President Bill Clinton in 1993. Died in 2000.	

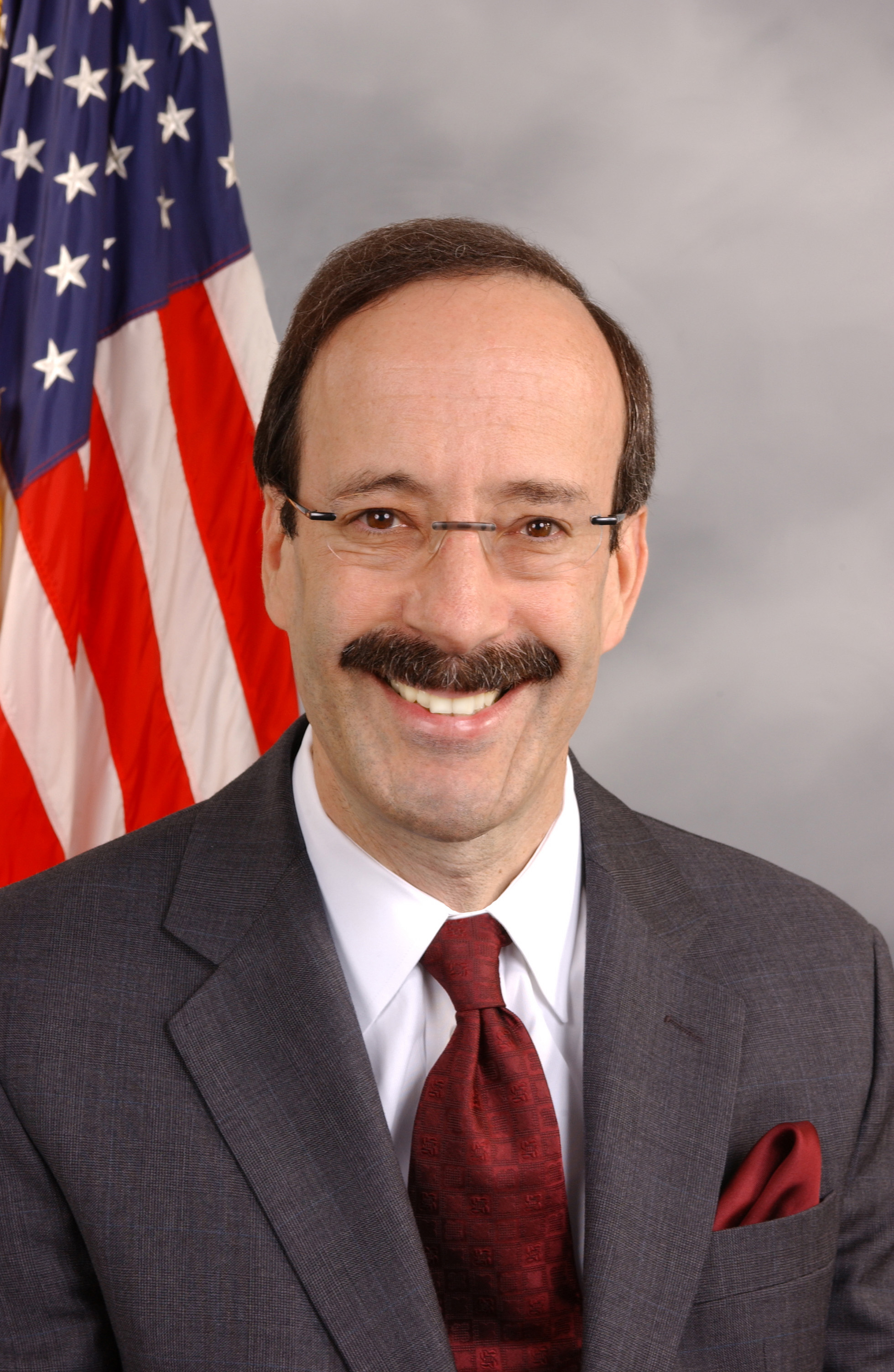
Eliot Engel

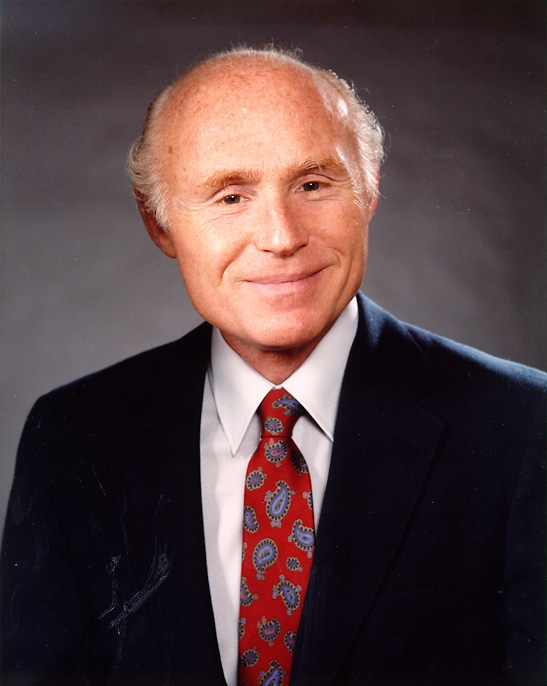
Herbert Kohl

=== Parliament of Canada ===
Name	Original chapter	Initiation year	Notability	Ref(s)
Peter Bercovitch	CN Eta	1924	Canadian provincial and federal politician who served in the Legislative Assembly of Quebec from 1919 to 1938 and was acclaimed to the House of Commons of Canada in 1938 and served until his death in office in late 1942. He was created a King's Counsel in 1911.	
David Croll	CN Tau Alpha	1924	Legislative Assembly of Ontario, Mayor of Windsor, Ontario and became Canada's first Jewish cabinet minister when he became Minister of Public Welfare. House of Commons of Canada from 1945 to 1955 and was appointed to the Senate of Canada in 1955, becoming Canada's first Jewish senator. Died in 1991.	

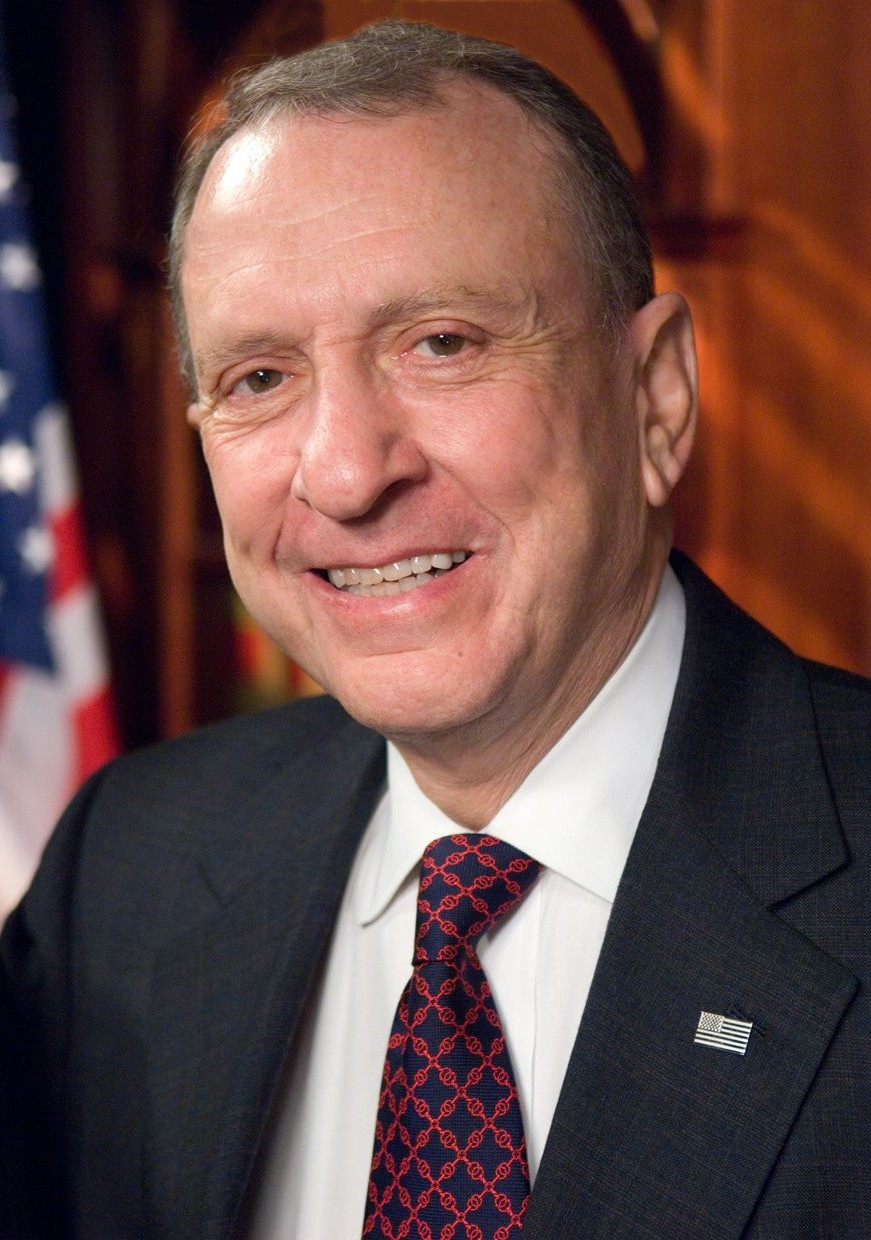
Arlen Specter

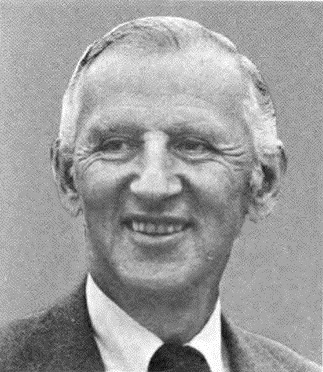
Sidney Yates

=== U.S. Cabinet and cabinet-level positions ===
Name	Original chapter	Initiation year	Notability	Ref(s)
Mortimer Caplin	VA Omega Alpha	1933	Lawyer appointed U.S. Commissioner of Internal Revenue in 1961 by President John F. Kennedy. Recipient of the Alexander Hamilton Award, the highest award conferred by the Secretary of the Treasury for his "distinguished leadership".	
David Temple	VA Omega Alpha	1969	Deputy Assistant Secretary for Program Operations at the Commerce Department and Recipient of the Department of Commerce Silver Medal as well as Vice President Al Gore's Hammer Award for outstanding leadership and contributions in government reinvention; and a Virginia Deputy Secretary of Education. He is the first African-American initiated into an NIC fraternity at the University of Virginia.	
Michael H. Moskow	PA Sigma	1956	President and chief executive officer of the Federal Reserve Bank of Chicago. He took office in September 1994 and retired in August 2007 in keeping with the Federal Reserve's mandatory retirement policy. In 2007, he served as a voting member of the Federal Open Market Committee, bringing the Seventh Federal Reserve District's perspective to policy discussions in Washington.	

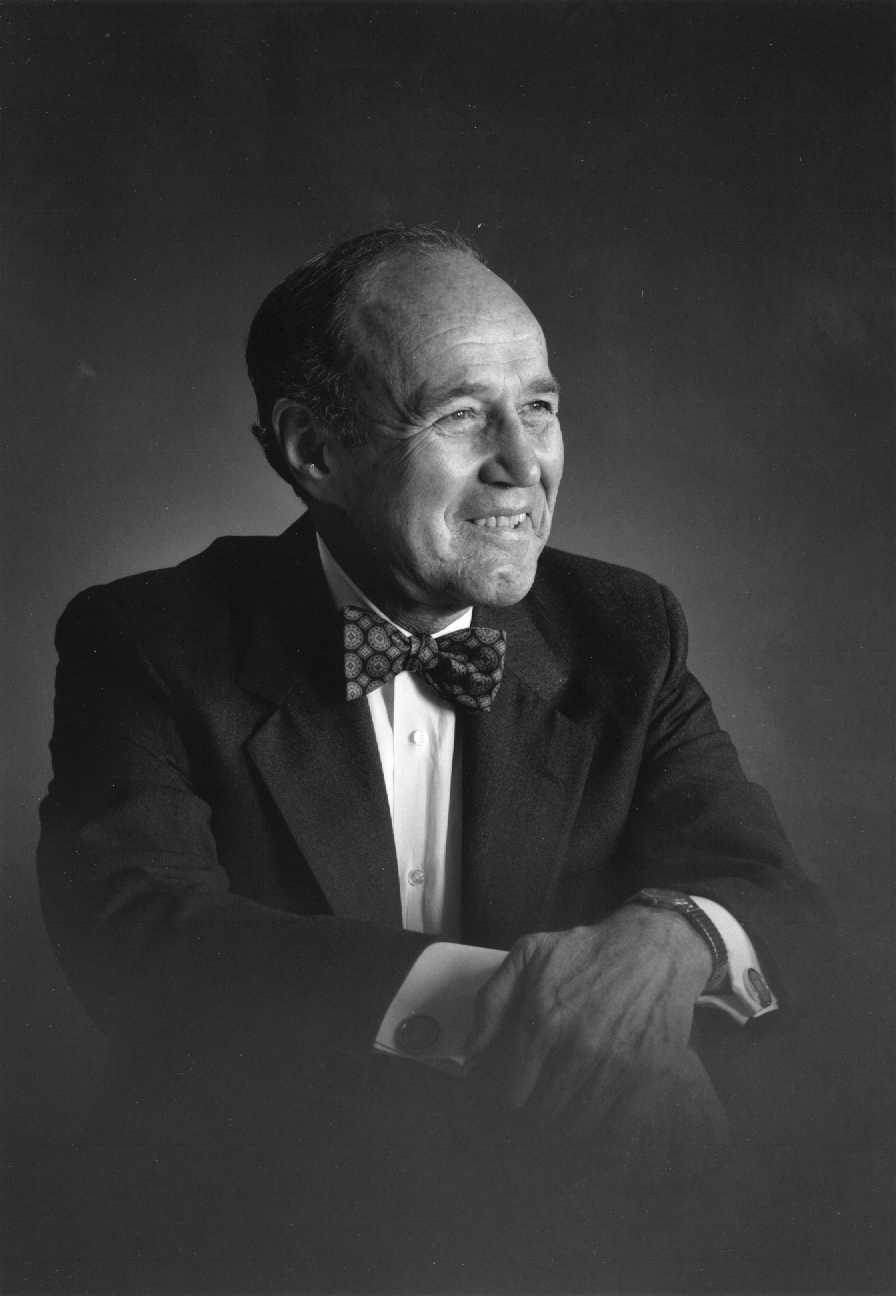
Mortimer Caplin

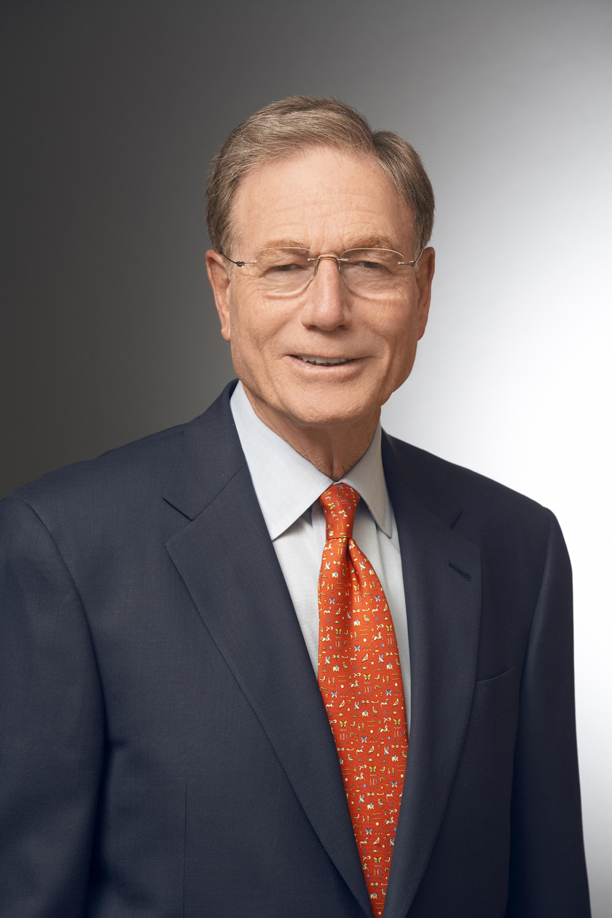
Michael Moskow

=== State and local ===
Name	Original chapter	Initiation year	Notability	Ref(s)
Michael E. Busch	PA Alpha Delta	1972	A member of the Democratic Party, Busch was the Speaker of the Maryland House of Delegates from 2003 until his death in April 2019. He represented the 30th district in Anne Arundel County, which includes the state capital of Annapolis, from 1987 to 2019.	
Miguel A. De Grandy	FL Delta	1977	Served in the Florida House of Representatives representing District 114 from 1989 to 1994.	
Malcolm Kenyatta	PA Alpha Delta	2010	A member of the Democratic Party, he has served as the Pennsylvania State Representative for the 181st district since 2019, and as Vice Chair of the Democratic National Committee since 2025.	
Courtney Malveaux	PA Omega Gamma	1988	Appointed by Virginia Governor Robert F. McDonnell May 3, 2010, as the 17th commissioner of the Virginia Department of Labor and Industry. Currently serves as vice chairman of the board for the Martin Luther King Jr. Living History and Public Policy Center.	
Ed Rendell	PA Epsilon Zeta	1962	45th Governor of Pennsylvania (D) serving from 2002 to 2010. Served as General Chairman of the Democratic National Committee during the 2000 presidential election. Mayor of Philadelphia from 1991 to 1999.	
Robert Shevin	FL Delta	1952	Florida Attorney General from 1971 until 1979. Served in the Florida House of Representatives and the Florida Senate. He later served as a judge for the Third District Court of Appeal from 1996 to 2005.	
Norman S. Weinberg	VA Psi	1937	Member of the Massachusetts House of Representatives from 1952 to 1978, justice of the Massachusetts District Court, Brighton 1981–1991, executive director of New England Association for Mediation and Arbitration (NEAMA) 1991–2000.	

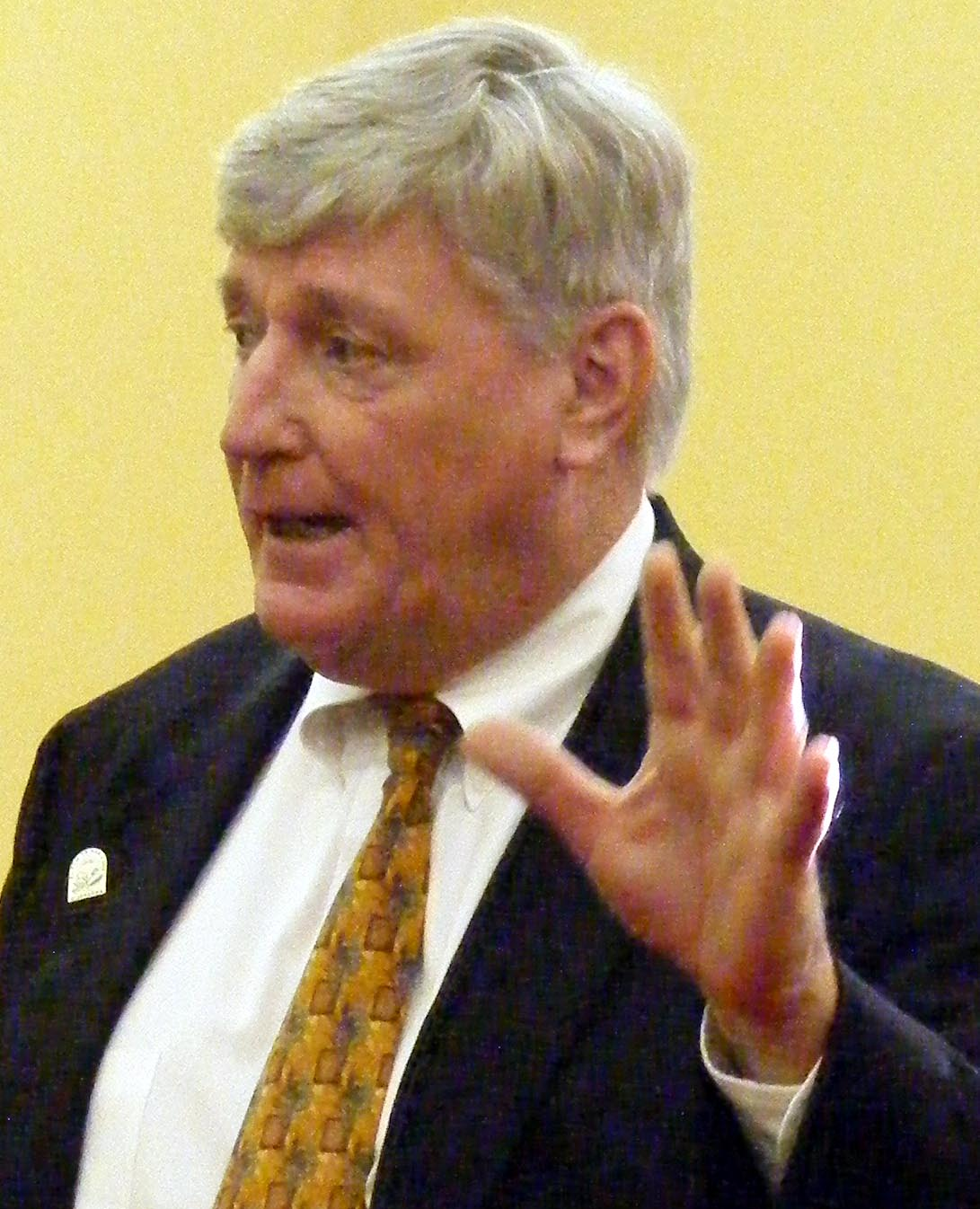
Michael E. Busch

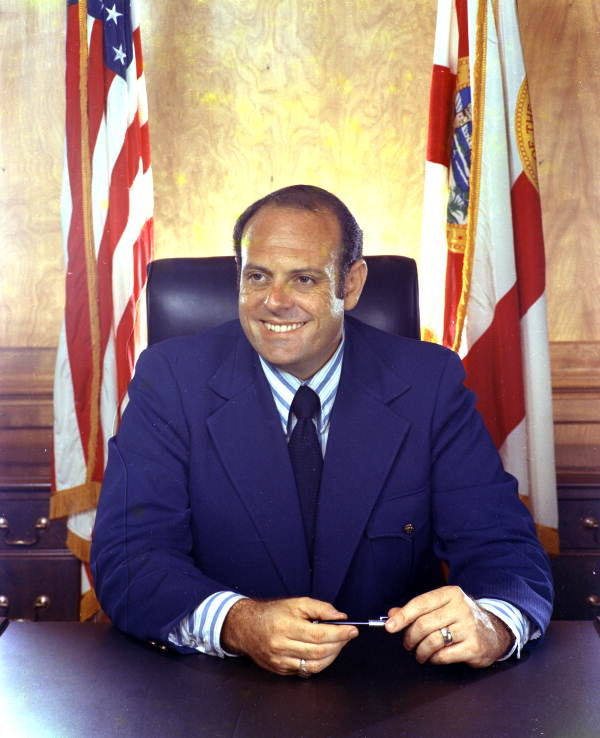
Robert Shevin

=== Diplomacy ===
Name	Original chapter	Initiation year	Notability	References
Laurence Steinhardt	NY Alpha	1909	U.S. Minister to Sweden, U.S. Ambassador to Peru, the U.S. Ambassador to the Soviet Union, U.S. Ambassador to Czechoslovakia, U.S. Ambassador to Canada, and U.S. Ambassador to Turkey. While ambassador to Turkey, Steinhardt was involved in limited rescues of Hungarian Jews from Bergen Belsen, and he also played a significant role in helping many eminent intellectuals fleeing Europe to find refuge in Turkey while ambassador there.	

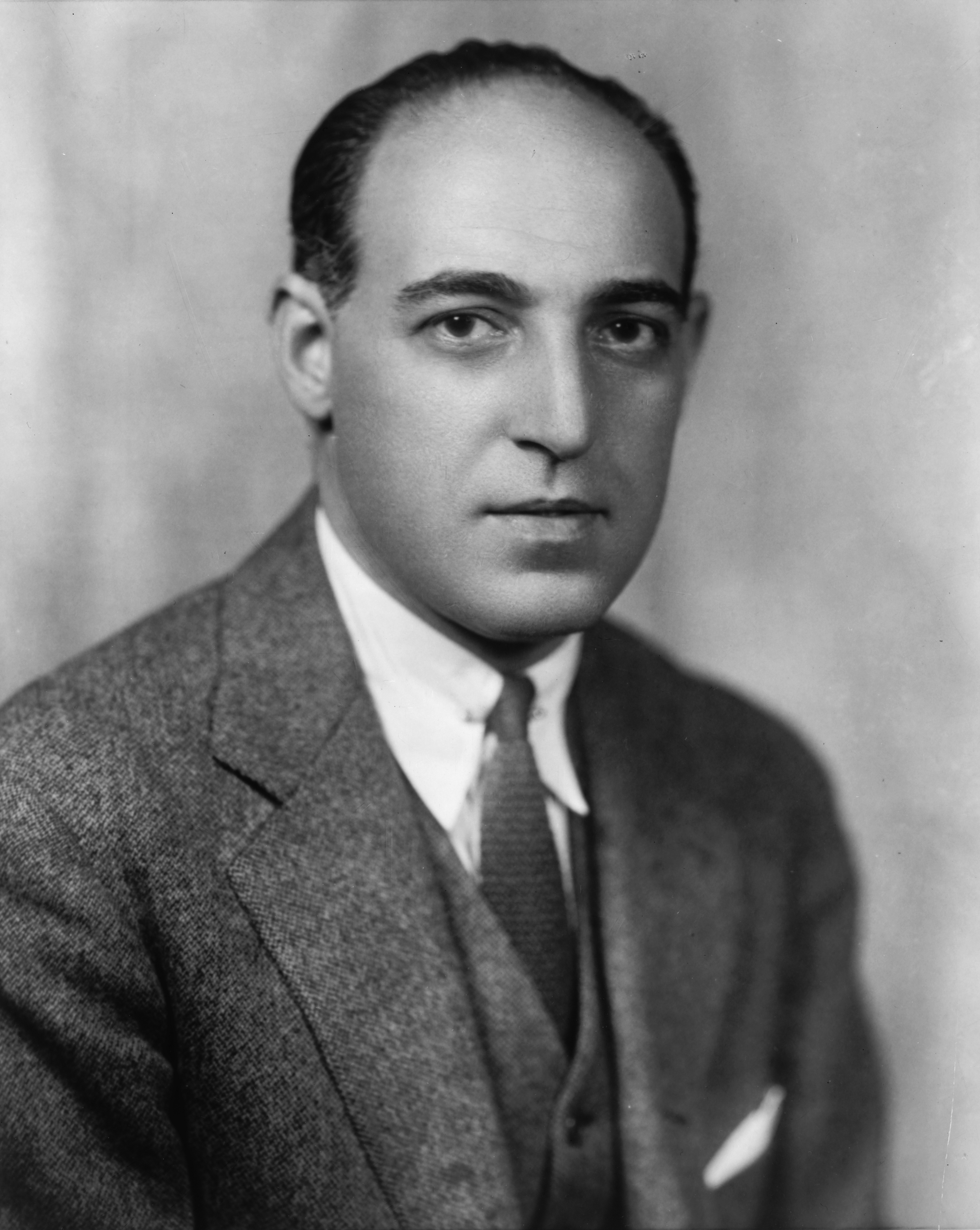
Laurence Steinhardt

== Science medicine, and technology ==
Name	Original chapter	Initiation year	Notability	References
Edward S. Baum	OK Iota	1955	Opened the second Ronald McDonald House and served on the board of directors of Ronald McDonald House Charities, and became a tireless consultant and volunteer helping other cities and hospitals open Ronald McDonald Houses. He is also the founder of the One Step at a Time camps for children with cancer.	
Eric Brewer	CA Tau	1987	Main inventor of a wireless networking scheme called WiLDNet. He was also made a tenured professor at UC Berkeley at the age of 32. In 1996, Brewer co-founded Inktomi Corporation. He is known for promoting the CAP Theorem about distributed network applications.	
Nathan Cohn	MA Theta	1923	Electrical engineer who was best known for his contributions to the control of interconnected electric power systems.	
Murray Feingold	PA Tau Omega	1949	Physician-in-chief of the Feingold Center for Children, the National Birth Defects Center, and a medical editor of WBZ radio and television. He has received a New England Emmy Award, authored 178 medical articles, written two books, including Genetics and Birth Defects in Clinical Practice, and has been on the faculty of Tufts, Boston University, and Harvard medical schools. He was the physician who first described Feingold syndrome (also called oculodigitoesophagoduodenal syndrome), a rare autosomal dominant hereditary disorder. In 1982, he founded the Genesis Fund, a non-profit organization created to bridge the gap between coordinated medical care and typical health insurance coverage. Died in 2015.	
Richard P. Feynman	MA Theta	1939	1965 Nobel Prize for Physics, Father of Quantum Electrodynamics	
Brent Glass	PA Sigma	1966	Director of the Smithsonian's National Museum of History. Prior to joining the Smithsonian on December 30, 2002, he was executive director of the Pennsylvania Historical and Museum Commission in Harrisburg, Pennsylvania, a position he held for fifteen years (1987–2002).	
Marshall Warren Nirenberg	FL Delta	1945	Biochemist and geneticist. He shared a Nobel Prize in Physiology or Medicine in 1968 with Har Gobind Khorana and Robert W. Holley for "breaking the genetic code" and describing how it operates in protein synthesis. In the same year, together with Har Gobind Khorana, he was awarded the Louisa Gross Horwitz Prize from Columbia University.	
Mitchell S. Rosenthal	PA Sigma	1953	Pioneer in substance abuse treatment who began work in the field in 1965 and has served as a White House advisor on drug policy, Special Consultant to the White House Office of National Drug Control Policy, and chair of the New York State Advisory Council on Substance Abuse from 1985 to 1997. He is a lecturer in psychiatry at Columbia University's College of Physicians and Surgeons. As a U.S. Navy psychiatrist, he established the first service-connected therapeutic community and subsequently founded Phoenix House in 1967 when he was Deputy Commissioner of New York City's Addiction Services Agency. Since resigning his city post in 1970, Dr. Rosenthal has built Phoenix House into the Nation's largest nonprofit substance abuse services system.	
Melvin Sabshin	FL Delta	1941	Medical director for the Psychiatric Association from 1974 to 1997 and author of the book Changing Psychiatry: A Personal Perspective. He is widely recognized for helping shape and advance the APA during his tenure and was recognized with an award in 1997 by the Association of Gay and Lesbian Psychiatrists for his longtime support of the AGLP.	
Max Tishler	MA Xi	1928	Scientist at Merck & Co. who led the research teams that synthesized ascorbic acid, riboflavin, cortisone, miamin, pyridoxin, pantothenic acid, nicotinamide, methionine, threonine, and tryptophan. He also led a microbiological group that developed the fermentation processes for actinomycin D, vitamin B12, streptomycin, and penicillin. Tishler invented sulfaquinoxaline for the treatment of coccidiosis.	

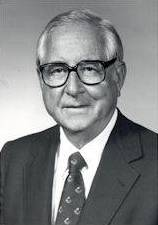
Nathan Cohn

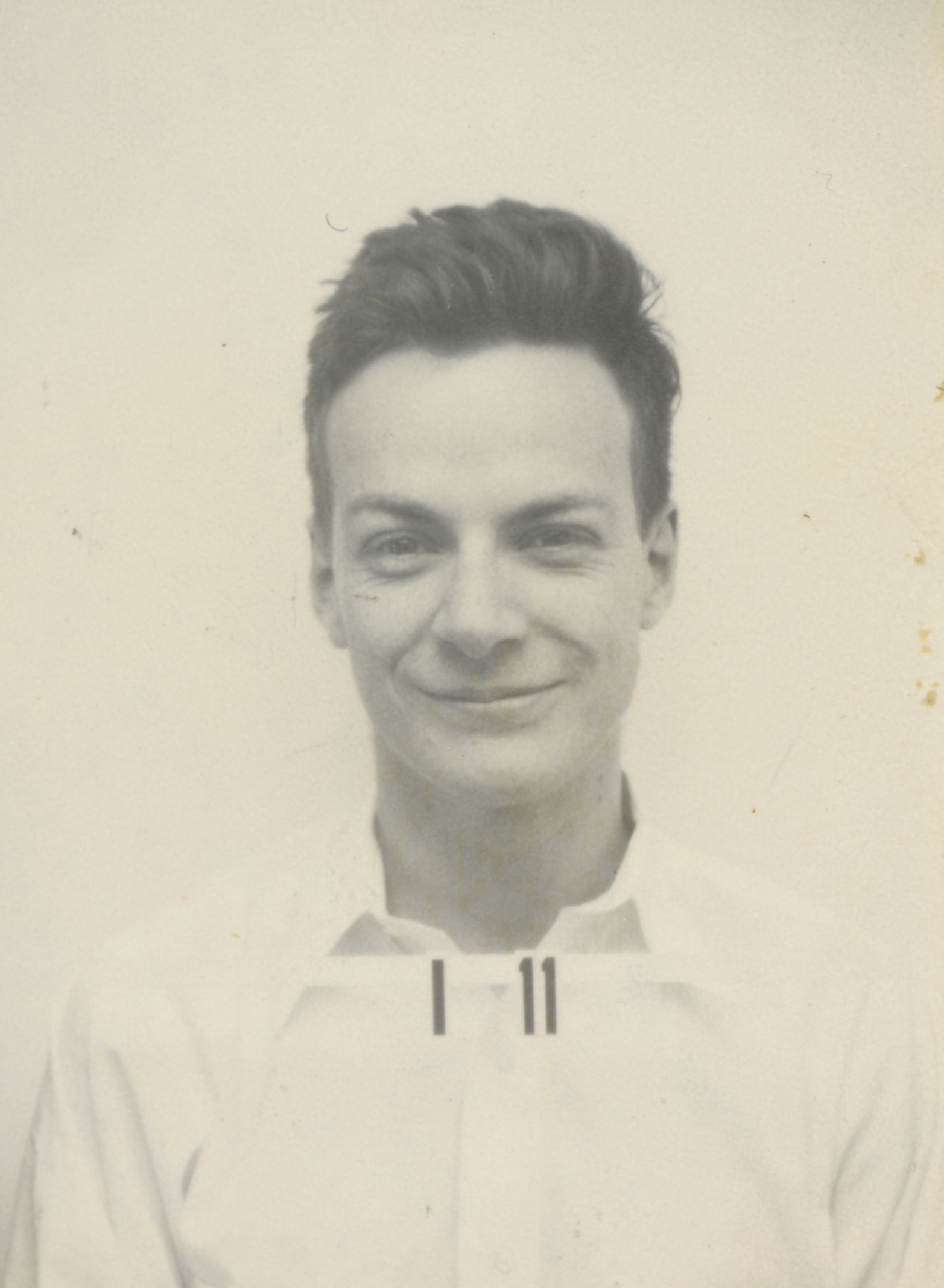
Richard P. Feynman

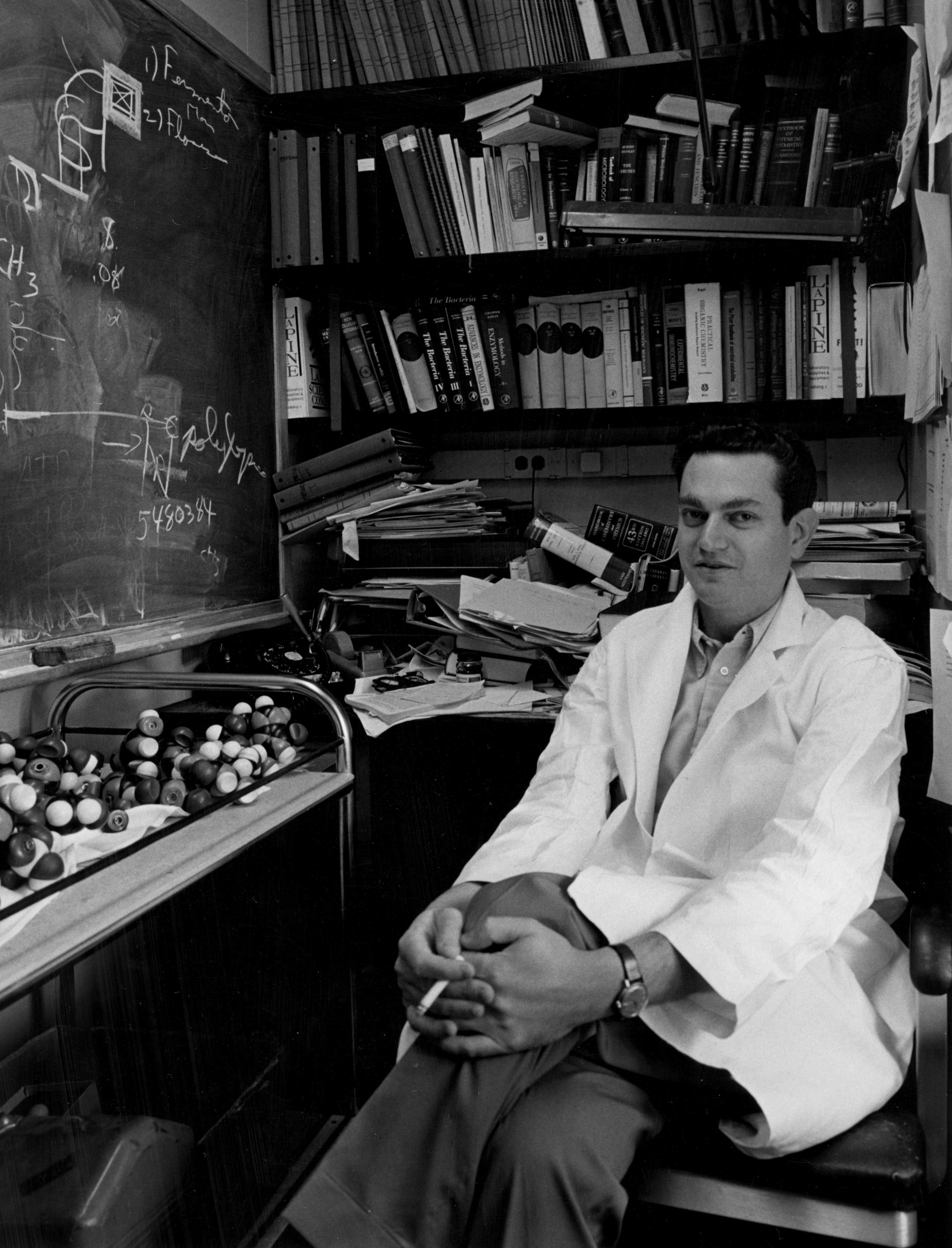
Marshall Warren Nirenberg

== Sports ==
Name	Original chapter	Initiation year	Notability	References
Harrison Dillard	OH Beta Tau	1948	1948 Summer Olympics & 1952 Summer Olympics Gold Medalist, Scout for the Cleveland Indians	
Artis Gilmore	FL Delta Tau	1970	ABA and NBA player and is inducted into the Basketball Hall of Fame. He is an eleven-time All-Star, the ABA Rookie of the Year, and an ABA MVP, and he remains the NBA career leader in field goal percentage and the top player in rebounds per game in the history of NCAA Division I basketball.	
Randy Grossman	PA Alpha Delta	1972	NFL tight end who played for eight seasons for the Pittsburgh Steelers and earned a Super Bowl Ring in Super Bowls IV, X, XIII and XIV.	
Jimmy Johnson	CA Upsilon	1959	NFL cornerback for the San Francisco 49ers. Enshrined into the Pro Football Hall of Fame in 1994. He played both offense and defense as an NCAA Division I college football player at UCLA.	
Rafer Johnson	CA Upsilon	1956	1956 Summer Olympics & 1960 Summer Olympics Decathlon Gold Medalist, helped wrestle Sirhan Sirhan to the floor immediately after Sirhan assassinated Robert F. Kennedy	
Chris Kerber	PA Alpha Delta	1990	Men's Crew Temple University. Two-time Pan-American Games gold medalist. In 2008, Kerber became head coach of Lightweight Rowing at Cornell University, where he led the team to four IRA National Championships (2014, 2015, 2017, and 2019), winning IRA Coach of the Year honors in those same seasons. In 2020, he was inducted into the Temple Athletics Hall of Fame.	
Sandy Koufax	OH Mu	1954	Pitcher Brooklyn/Los Angeles Dodgers from 1955 to 1966, inducted into Baseball Hall of Fame in 1972	
Rudy LaRusso	NH Pi	1956	5-time NBA All-Star for the Minneapolis Lakers.	
Irving Mondschein	NY Gamma	1947	The National AAU decathlon champion in 1944, 1946, and 1947 and the high jump champion at the 1947 and 1948 NCAA Men's Track and Field Championships. He finished 6th in the decathlon at the 1948 Summer Olympics. He is one of the few people to coach two different countries in the Olympics. He led the Israeli track and field team at the 1952 Summer Olympics (the first Games in which Israel competed) and then coached the United States at the 1988 Summer Olympics. He also coached the U.S. track team at the 1950, 1981, and 1985 Maccabiah Games. He was the assistant track coach (1965–79) and the head coach (1979–87) at the University of Pennsylvania. He was inducted into the National Jewish Sports Hall of Fame	
Amin Nikfar	CA Tau	2002	Iranian shot putter. Amin finished 1st (Gold) in the 2004 Asian Indoor Championships, tenth at the 2005 Asian Championships, and he competed at the 2008 Olympic Games. His personal best throw is 20.05 metres, achieved in July 2011 in Toronto, which qualified him for the 2012 London Olympics.	
Al Rosen	FL Omega Eta	1947	major league third baseman and right-handed slugger. He played his entire 10-year career (1947–1956) with the Cleveland Indians in the League, where he drove in 100 or more runs 5 years in a row, was a 4-time All-Star, twice led the league in home runs and twice in RBIs, and was an MVP. He was president (and chief operating officer) of the Yankees (1978–79), then the Astros (1980–85), and then president and general manager of the Giants (1985–92). Died, 2015	
Dick Savitt	NY Delta	1947	Ranked #2 in the world at the height of his short career, he is one of the three men to have won both the Australian and British Tennis Championships in one year (following Don Budge (1938), and preceding Jimmy Connors (1974)). In 1961, he won both the Singles and Doubles (with Mike Franks) gold medals at the World Maccabiah Games in Israel. He was inducted into the International Tennis Hall of Fame in 1976, the International Jewish Sports Hall of Fame in 1979, and the Intercollegiate Tennis Association Men's Collegiate Tennis Hall of Fame in 1986.	
Bud Selig	WI Omega	1953	Commissioner of Major League Baseball	
Lewis Wolff	WI Omega	1957	Co-owner of the Oakland Athletics of Major League Baseball and the San Jose Earthquakes of Major League Soccer.	

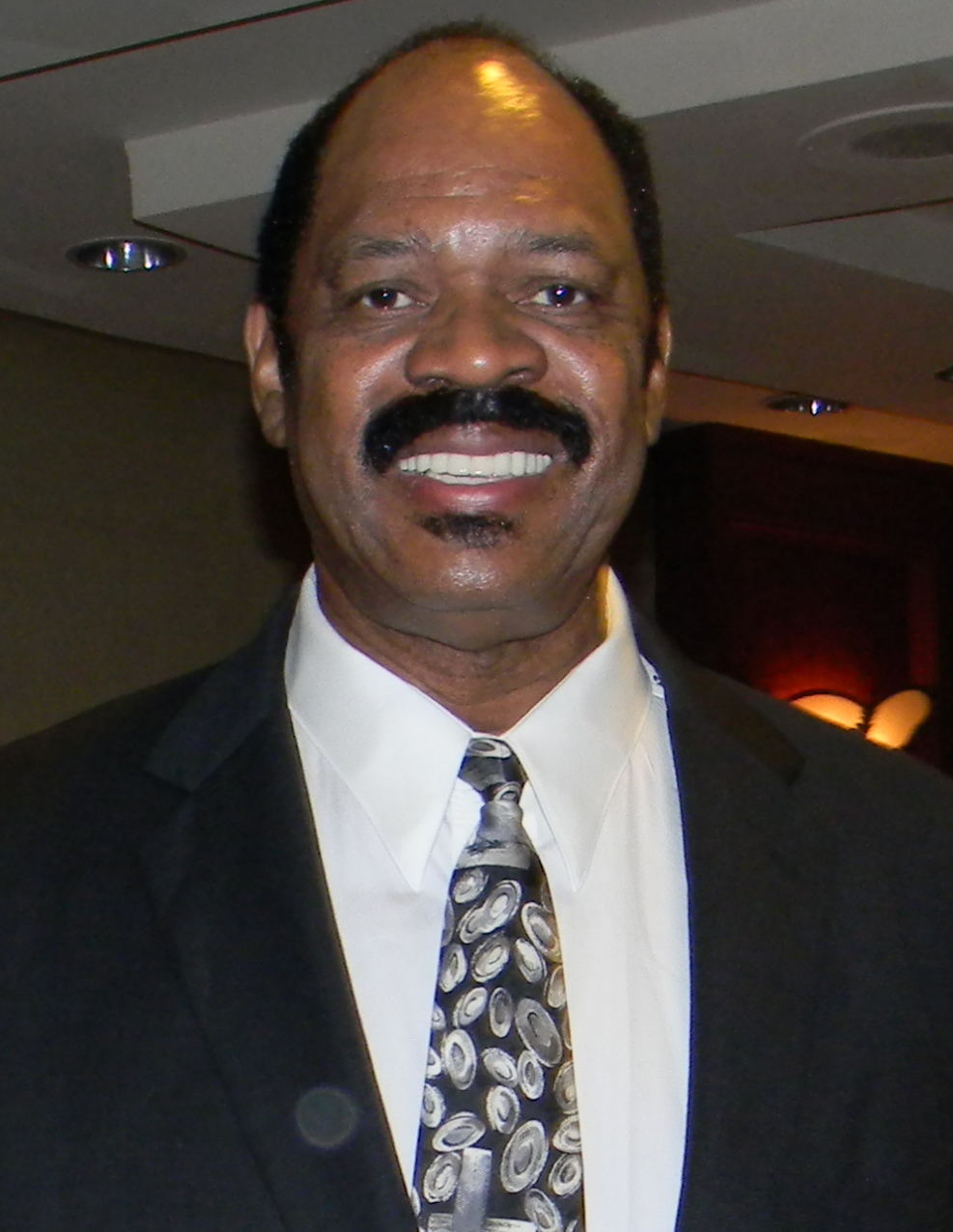
Artis Gilmore

Sandy Koufax

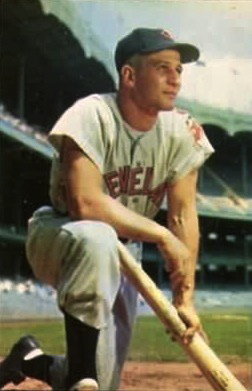
Al Rosen
