= Unbanning of violent video games in Germany =

Petition against ban on violent video games

Straftaten gegen die öffentliche Ordnung – Gegen ein Verbot von Action-Computerspielen (lit. 'Offenses against public order - Against a ban on action computer games') was a successful petition launched in Germany on June 5, 2009. The petition opposed a proposed government ban on the production and distribution of violent games. The German government ultimately reversed its position and did not implement the proposed ban.

== Background ==
In the days following the Winnenden school shooting in March 2009, several politicians called for legal actions, including a ban on violent video games. In May 2009, some families of the victims issued an open letter addressed to German President Horst Köhler, Chancellor Angela Merkel and Minister-President of Baden-Württemberg Günther Oettinger, echoing calls for a ban on violent video games. In June 2009, "the country's 16 interior ministers asked the Bundestag to ban the creation and distribution of games involving violent acts against human or human-like characters. Government criticism of video games had been growing since a school shooting in March was linked to online-shooter Counter-Strike". This plan drew ire from the German gaming community, which resulted in an online petition to challenge the German government decision.

The petition itself reads (in an English translation):

The German Bundestag should decide against the decision of the interior minister conference from the 5th of June, that aims for a ban of action computer games. As an adult citizen and a person eligible to vote, I beg you firmly;

To erase the irritating and discriminating term of 'killerspiele' [killer game] from political discussion.

To strengthen the trust of the public in existing national youth protection mechanics.

To improve and warrant the execution of existing laws, that ensure kids and the youth only get access to video games and computer games rating according to the USK.

To support parents and educationally responsible persons in the advancement of media competence.

To promote the computer games and video games industry in Germany and especially the training of these promising professions.

== Aftermath ==
The e-petition eventually reached 73,000 signatures, prompting a government review. Officials have stated that the German government will focus on "educating citizens about the country's USK game ratings standard", instead of changing the current legislation. The creator of the petition was actually allowed by the government to speak in front of the country's Committee on Petitions and he "argued that banning violent games would be a misstep, and that further education on games and the media would be a better goal for Germany".

== Coverage ==
The reversal of the violent video game ban was covered by major gaming media, such as Joystiq, GamePolitics, Destructoid, 1UP and even mainstream media, such as The Guardian.

== See also ==
- Video games in Germany
- Killerspiel – pejorative German-language term for video games featuring violence against human/humanoid characters
