= Entertainment Consumers Association =

US-based non-profit organization

- Founded: July 2006
- Founder: Hal Halpin
- Type: Non-profit organization
- Purpose: Video game consumer advocacy
- Location: Wilton, Connecticut
- Region served: United States
- Key people: Hal Halpin, president
- Website: www.theeca.com

Entertainment Consumers Association (ECA) is a United States–based non-partisan, non-government, non-profit organization dedicated to the interests of individuals who play computer and video games in the United States and Canada.

== History ==
Hal Halpin, a game industry veteran and former president of the Interactive Entertainment Merchants Association (IEMA) – now called the Entertainment Merchants Association (EMA) – founded ECA in July 2006. The concept of the ECA was born following an IEMA board of directors meeting, in which Halpin recognized a need for consumer representation. The association was launched as a means for consumer rights advocacy following a string of anti-games legislation aimed at criminalizing the sale of certain video games. Although publishers were effectively represented by Entertainment Software Association (ESA) and retailers by Entertainment Merchants Association (EMA), consumers of video games were virtually unrepresented until the launch of ECA. Halpin was still president of the association as of April 2021.

== Activities ==
ECA is an ardent supporter of consumer rights and advocacy, specifically in defending and advancing the interests of gamers. The organization does this through a variety of initiatives including netroots and lobbying efforts at the state and national governmental level, an activity permitted by its 501(c)(4) status. ECA also coalition builds with like-minded organizations including First Amendment advocacy groups and parallel trade associations. The ECA is non-partisan and does not support, oppose or give money to any candidates or political parties.

The ECA Member division negotiates and offers reduced rates for members with various companies that sell game-related merchandise and services including; magazine and premium website subscriptions, discounts on game rentals and purchases and free or discounted admission to trade shows, conferences and concerts, etc. They provide programs for reduced-cost medical and life insurance, financial aid, tuition assistance and scholarship opportunities for members as well as career advice, job boards, resume writing aid and discussion forums and boards.

The association distinguished itself early by weighing in publicly on issues that the parallel trade associations did not, including standing in defense of the game Mass Effect and its developer, BioWare, during the related controversy surrounding supposed sexualization of the product. ECA issued a press statement calling on FOX News to retract the misleading story. ECA also was a founding member of the Gamers for Net Neutrality initiative, which sought to educate and empower gamer consumers about the issues surrounding network neutrality as it relates to online gaming. Partnering with MoveOn.org, SaveTheInternet.com, and Games for Change, the coalition provides an educational area on ECA's website as well as digital advocacy tools for gamers. The association also established several other digital advocacy sub-groups including Gamers for Digital Rights, Gamers for Universal Broadband. Membership is not required to participate in any of the three grass roots initiatives.

On May 12, 2010, the ECA announced that they would be submitting an amicus curiae (friend of the court) document in support of the gaming industry in the Schwarzenegger v. EMA First Amendment case. The organization also stated that they intend to amend a consumer petition to their brief to request that the court find that games should continue to enjoy the same First Amendment protections as music and movies and not be legislated and regulated like alcohol, tobacco and firearms.

The State of California's case is an appeal urging the Court to adopt a new constitutional standard that would enable states to ban the sale or rental of violent video games for those under age 18. The Ninth Circuit Court previously found that there was no proof that playing such games would cause physical or psychological harm to minors. The appeals court also said the law was not the least-restrictive approach to protecting children from exposure to such games.

ECA was a coalition partner with Reddit, Google, EFF, Public Knowledge, Major League Gaming, Demand Progress and others in opposing the Stop Online Piracy Act (SOPA) and its counterpart, the Protect Intellectual Property Act (PIPA). The association also stood opposed to the Copyright Modernization Act in Canada and the Anti-Counterfeiting Trade Agreement (ACTA), internationally.

== GamePolitics.com ==
The ECA merged a number of long-standing staple brands when forming the organization which lent it early credibility and built-in expertise in the respective fields. Among the more prominent brands was GamePolitics.com, a blog originally written and maintained by Dennis McCauley, now run by game journalist Pete Gallagher, the former Editor-in-Chief of GameDaily.com. GP, as it had come to be known in the business and by the site's fans, is an information portal for all matters related to game legislation and grass roots lobbying initiatives.

The organization also publishes a daily email-based electronic newsletter, ECA Today, which is mailed nightly to all members. The newsletter informs and educates gamers about current and potential anti-games legislation, and acts as a call to arms in the association's grass roots lobbying initiatives employing electronic advocacy. ECA also emails out a monthly members-only newsletter which keeps members abreast of the efforts being undertaken and advises the membership of new partnerships and coalitions it has joined. The final two products are GameJobs.com, an interactive entertainment industry job board, and Video Game Yellow Pages (VGYP), which has served for over ten years as an online directory information for the games business.

== GameCulture.com ==
On December 5, 2007, the ECA announced that the association was launching another publication, called GameCulture. Journalist and co-author of SmartBomb: The Quest for Art, Entertainment, and Big Bucks in the Videogame Revolution, Aaron Ruby, was hired on to be the Editor-in-Chief. The association felt the need to launch the site as a resource for promoting gaming in a more positive light and addressing the ways in which gamers and gaming have impacted broader society. In September 2009, GameCulture added veteran game journalist, John Keefer to its ranks who was followed by New Zealand–based writer, Julie Gray, in January 2010. Popular web comic, Experience Points, penned by Scott Johnson, moved from its original home at Crispy Gamer to GameCulture.

== Controversy ==
On December 2, 2009, controversy arose regarding the ECA's membership cancellation policy, in which the association's membership terms and conditions were changed without notifying ECA users. The change was made due to an exploit in a partner's coupon codes. The cancellation policy change temporarily required that members mail a physical letter requesting cancellation while the association upgraded their systems. There were also complaints about the change in the terms and conditions being made without notifying the membership, which struck some members as ironic given the ECA's stance regarding End User License Agreements. The three-week ordeal ended on December 24, 2009 once the promised new modules went public giving members online account termination and an online auto-renewal opt-out functionality similar to Xbox Live and ECA's listing with the CT Better Business Bureau was raised to an A−.

On February 6, 2013, the ECA announced via Facebook their appointment of "Gerard Williams" aka "The Hip Hop Gamer" as their video game ambassador. The appointment was received with negative reception by gamers and gaming press who felt that his reputation of verbally/physically threatening others and use of the word 'faggot' would hurt the image and cause of gamers as a consumer group. Heather Ellertson, the ECA's Vice President of Marketing, sent out a press release saying that Gerard was in the process of turning his life around and they "wanted to give him the opportunity to be a voice for gamers and a positive role model for gaming". The ECA & 'Hip Hop Gamer Inc' then announced via their Facebook page that all complaints, comments and criticisms should be directed to The Hip Hop Gamer himself and that he did not represent the views of any of their partners or sponsors. Gerard Williams then published a video explaining that he had only used the word 'faggot' because someone told him to 'shut up' during a Sony press event.

== Support ==
=== Member dues ===
The ECA receives financial support from its dues-paying membership – individuals who pay $19.99 annually ($14.99 for students and members of the military). The association claims not to accept funding from industry partners, nor does it permit game publisher advertising on any of its websites or publications, though open job placements on the ECA's GameJobs.com are paid-for by game industry companies. The organisation also receives additional pro bono legal assistance from Hughes Hubbard & Reed.

The last year in which the ECA reported revenue was 2018.

==== Sponsors ====
Additionally, the association lists the brands and companies which are marketing partners with the ECA on their website. Most provide discounts and special promotions, but none provide funding.

== See also ==
- Consumer
- Gamer
- Digital Rights
- Player (game)
