= The Genesis Foundation for Children =

Nonprofit Foundation based in Boston, Massachusetts

- Formation: 1982; 44 years ago
- Founder: Dr. Murray Feingold
- Type: 501(c)(3) organization
- Purpose: Clinical and patient care
- Headquarters: Boston, Massachusetts
- President: Matthew Hoffman
- Affiliations: Boston Children's Hospital
- Website: www.thegenesisfoundation.org

The Genesis Foundation for Children is a non-profit organization that provides funding for clinical, informational, and therapeutic programs for children born with genetic disorders and rare diseases in the New England area. Through fundraising events, individual donations and corporate sponsorships, The Genesis Foundation for Children has raised over $30 million for over 60,000 New England children and their families.
