= GameWeek Magazine =

American video game magazine

- Editor: Mike Davila/Jeff Tschiltsch
- Categories: Video games
- Frequency: Weekly
- Circulation: 63,000 subscribers
- First issue: May 1995
- Final issue: 2002
- Company: Cyberactive Media Group
- Country: United States
- Based in: Wilton, Connecticut
- Language: English
- ISSN: 1097-394X

GameWeek Magazine was a weekly video game magazine that was made by Cyberactive Media Group, Inc., a publishing company which specialized in business-to-business products serving the computer and video game industry. Its headquarters was in Wilton, Connecticut. GameWeek was the leading trade publication of its time, and to this day remains the last printed trade publication which served the North American market.

== History ==
It was published initially under the name VideoGame Advisor (VGA) beginning in 1995 and changed names twice, to GameWeek, as it is best known, and later to Interactive Entertainment. "Interactive entertainment" was a phrase that is attributed to the magazine, but became part of the industry's vernacular and was popularized by Hal Halpin, founder and publisher – representing the convergence of the console, online and computer games sectors.

GameWeek was a glossy tabloid-sized newspaper-style magazine which included interviews with the game industry’s leading personalities, feature stories on the latest trends and reviews and previews of products from a salability perspective (as opposed to enthusiast media, which covered games from their playability or fun-factor). A significant portion of the magazine’s advertising revenue came from game publisher ads promoting upcoming titles to the leading retail buyers – who comprised the bulk of the 63,000 subscribers.

The publication went largely unopposed throughout its history, largely due to spawning several ancillary products which covered market niches, including GameDaily (a daily electronic newsletter and website), GameJobs (a job site and board), Official E3 Show Daily, and a re-publishing of Game Over: Press Start to Continue (the authoritative novel chronicling the industry). Several magazines did attempt to unseat the publication’s prominence including MCV.

GameWeek ran from January 1995 until January 2002, at which point its publishing company was forced to close due to mounting accounts receivable attributable primarily to a post 9/11 decline in advertising spending.

Of the three major magazines, only MCV has survived and although UK-focused, it is seen by many as the only trade publication available that is relevant to the US market.

== Current state ==
When Cyberactive Media Group folded, the magazine ceased print and moved its only remaining asset, its name, online. The website, Gignews.com, uses the brand to drive traffic to its website, which is only infrequently updated. There remain no print trade magazines serving the North American interactive entertainment market, although there are several in Europe and Asia.
