= Hal Halpin =

American computer game executive and entrepreneur

- Born: September 1, 1969 (age 57)
- Occupation: Consumer Advocate Consultant
- Known for: Founder of the video game industry's trade association IEMA, and consumer association ECA.

Hal Halpin (born September 1, 1969) is an American computer game executive and entrepreneur, and is the president and founder of the Entertainment Consumers Association (ECA).

== Background ==
Halpin is perhaps best known as the founder of the US video game industry's retail trade association, Interactive Entertainment Merchants Association (IEMA) which merged with Video Software Dealers Association (VSDA) to form Entertainment Merchants Association (EMA) in 2006. He is currently the president of the Crest Group, a consulting company serving the video game industry. Crest Group is the association management company that previously managed IEMA and now manages the Entertainment Consumers Association (ECA). He is also a Contributing/Guest Editor for 1UP.com, BitMob, Electronic Gaming Monthly (EGM), Game Informer Magazine, GameDaily, GameTheory, IGN, iMedia Connection, IndustryGamers, and The Escapist.

== Career ==
The Entertainment Consumers Association was launched in response to the need for consumer rights advocacy following a string of anti-games and anti-gamer legislation which would have criminalized the sale of certain video games if not for the efforts of trade groups in opposition. The industry itself was well represented by the International Game Developers Association (IGDA), the Entertainment Software Association (ESA), and the Entertainment Merchants Association (EMA), but those that purchase and play games went completely unrepresented until the launch of the ECA. Notable ECA publications include GamePolitics, GameCulture and ECA Today.

While running the IEMA, Halpin was involved in a number of historically important changes including the Hot Coffee scandal, retailers carding for mature-rated games, and the standardization of PC games packaging and related platform identification marks. During that time he also became a favourite target of noted anti-games activist and attorney, Jack Thompson. The two opponents were scheduled to debate publicly at the 2007 Penny Arcade Expo, but the debate was cancelled and replaced in the schedule with keynote speaker, Wil Wheaton.

Prior to Crest, ECA, and IEMA, Halpin was the founder and president of Cyberactive Media Group, a business-to-business publishing company. There he was publisher of Interactive Entertainment Magazine(formerly known as GameWeek Magazine and Video Game Advisor), which was the leading trade publication serving the sector. He also previously founded and was the publisher of GameDaily, the category's primary daily news outlet.

Although he claims credit for coining the phrase "interactive entertainment," this claim is certainly untrue. Halpin previously founded and was the publisher of GameDaily, the category's primary daily news outlet and career site and job board, GameJobs.com, which remains a staple HR tool serving the trade. Halpin also re-published David Sheff's Game Over, a book on the history of the video game industry considered by many to be the "Bible" of the video game business and re-launched the industry's first charitable organization, Games for Good.

== Representation ==
While acting as president of the IEMA, Halpin was frequently called upon to represent the sector in mass-media outlets, speaking at conventions and trade shows, and in representing the medium to federal and state government representatives. His role became more public as president of the ECA while advocating consumer rights issues such as Net Neutrality and Universal Broadband, Fair Use and DMCA, ACTA negotiations transparency and Taxation on video games and other digital products. On March 25, 2009, speaking at the FTC workshop on Digital Rights, he recommended in testimony that the presence of embedded Digital Rights Management (DRM) technology be disclosed to customers prior to the sale/license of the software and that End User License Agreements (EULA) – also known as software license agreements – be standardized for packaged goods software. Halpin and ECA also represented the position of game consumers via an amicus brief and online petition regarding the U.S. Supreme Court case, Schwarzenegger v. EMA, known as the violent video games case.

== Media appearances ==
Halpin's brother, Spencer, created a feature-length documentary about video game violence, Spencer Halpin's Moral Kombat, in which Halpin is interviewed. He also appeared in Playing Columbine, a documentary about the controversial videogame, Super Columbine Massacre RPG!. Halpin is a vocal consumer advocate, providing reaction quotes and interviews for news media on topically-important issues and making himself available for national news journalists.
