= GamePolitics.com =

Blogging site

- GP homepage
- Website type: Blog
- Owner: Entertainment Consumers Association
- Creator: Dennis McCauley
- Website: GamePolitics.com
- Commercial: No
- Registration: None
- Launched: March 2005
- Current status: Defunct

GamePolitics.com was a blog which covered the politics of computer and video games. GamePolitics was launched by freelance journalist Dennis McCauley in March 2005. At the time, McCauley was the video game columnist for The Philadelphia Inquirer, a position he held from 1998 to 2009. Growing somewhat bored of writing video game reviews, McCauley created GamePolitics in order to track the political, legal and cultural impact of video games. The site was often referred to as GP by followers.

Under McCauley's tenure as editor, frequent topics included video game legislation, the effects of media coverage on video games and gamer culture, and stories about high-profile critics and/or supporters of the industry. Early on, GP established itself as a site which included a great deal of original content based on McCauley's reporting. For example, GP published the first interview with Patrick Wildenborg, the Dutch modder who discovered the infamous Hot Coffee mod sex animations embedded in Rockstar Games' controversial Grand Theft Auto: San Andreas.

GP's frequent and incisive coverage of the unfolding Hot Coffee scandal brought mainstream media attention to the site from publications such as Fortune and The New York Times as traditional news outlets attempted to come to grips with the political and societal aspects of the burgeoning video game controversy. In December 2007, Entertainment Weekly named GamePolitics to its "100 Greatest Websites". GP has also been cited in The Washington Post.

GamePolitics was referenced in Sex in Video Games, a 2007 book by game developer, activist and academic Brenda Brathwaite and has also been cited in numerous scholarly writings.

The activities of Jack Thompson, an activist against violence and/or sex in video games, were a common subject of coverage, particularly between 2005 and 2009.

During McCauley's time as editor, GamePolitics adopted a pro-consumer orientation, leveling sharp criticism at the video game industry on certain issues. Most notable among these was a series of editorial and articles charging that game publisher Electronic Arts had engaged in monopolistic practices in regard to its popular Madden NFL franchise. As early as April 2005, GamePolitics called for the United States Department of Justice to investigate E.A.'s conduct in regard to a possible Madden monopoly. While no Justice Department investigation was forthcoming, in 2008, a class action suit was filed against Electronic Arts on behalf of gamer consumers who were negatively impacted by Madden pricing. The allegations in the lawsuit largely followed the line of reasoning laid out by McCauley's coverage. In July 2009, GamePolitics broke the news that plaintiffs in the class action suit alleged that monopolistic practices by E.A. had cost Madden buyers $926 million. The class action was eventually settled for $27 million in 2013.

GamePolitics has had on occasionally contentious relationship with video game industry lobbying group the Entertainment Software Association (ESA). In 2008, the site criticized the choice of Texas Gov. Rick Perry as keynote speaker for the Electronic Entertainment Expo (E3). The commentary provoked a harsh response from the ESA, whose spokesman told video game blog Joystiq, " ...calling GamePolitics a news site is as laughable as saying there's a Cuban free press."

GamePolitics has also covered a small number events live, including a demonstration in Philadelphia which was staged to protest against a first-person shooter game published by the United States Army as a recruiting tool.

Hal Halpin subsequently founded the Entertainment Consumers Association (ECA), a non-profit organization for video game consumers. On October 25, 2006, it was announced that GamePolitics.com had been acquired by the ECA and that McCauley would stay on as editor.

GamePolitics was initially published on the LiveJournal blogging platform with the GP blog embedded within a standard HTML site design. However, this structure proved problematic, particularly with RSS feeds. For this reason the site was redesigned and migrated to the WordPress platform in late 2006. Following the ECA acquisition, GamePolitics was migrated to the Drupal CMS format.

On September 14, 2009, Dennis McCauley announced that he was stepping down as editor. Pete Gallagher (former editor-in-chief of ECA Today and GameDaily) was named as his successor. Gallagher's run at GamePolitics was short-lived, however. James Fudge succeeded Gallagher as editor. In the wake of McCauley's 2009 departure, GamePolitics editorial focus underwent a significant change in direction. The site discontinued original reporting with the vast majority of articles simply linking to content created elsewhere.

In April 2016, managing editor James Fudge announced that GamePolitics would be shutting down, as the site's mission of protecting games had been accomplished after Brown v. Entertainment Merchants Association and the site was no longer needed. The site no longer updates as of April 18, 2016.

== See also ==
- Government simulation game
- Jack Thompson (activist)
