= Feingold syndrome =

- Other names: Oculodigitoesophagoduodenal syndrome
- Feingold Syndrome is inherited in an autosomal dominant fashion.
- Specialty: Medical genetics

Feingold syndrome (also called oculodigitoesophagoduodenal syndrome) is a rare autosomal dominant hereditary disorder. It is named after Murray Feingold, an American physician who first described the syndrome in 1975. Until 2003, at least 79 patients have been reported worldwide.

== Presentation ==
Feingold syndrome is marked by various combinations of microcephaly, limb malformations, esophageal and duodenal atresias. Cognition is affected, and ranges from below-average IQ to mild intellectual disability.

== Genetics ==
Feingold syndrome is caused by mutations in the neuroblastoma-derived V-myc avian myelocytomatosis viral-related oncogene (MYCN) which is located on the short arm of chromosome 2 (2p24.1). This syndrome has also been linked to microdeletions in the MIR17HG locus which encodes a micro RNA cluster known as miR-17/92.

== Diagnosis ==
The diagnosis is based on the following clinical findings:

- microcephaly
- clinodactyly and shortness of index and little fingers
- syndactyly of 2nd & 3rd and 4th & 5th toe
- short palpebral fissures
- esophageal and/or duodenal atresia

== Treatment ==
There is no known treatment for the disorder, but surgery for malformations, special education, and treatment of hearing loss are important.
