= Murray Feingold =

American physician and geneticist

- Born: July 20, 1930; Hazleton, Pennsylvania
- Died: July 17, 2015 (aged 84); Boston, Massachusetts
- Occupations: Pediatrician, geneticist

Murray Feingold (July 20, 1930 – July 17, 2015) was an American pediatrician, geneticist, and founder of the Feingold Center for Children in Waltham, Massachusetts. He was also the founder and president of The Genesis Foundation for Children.

== Early life and career ==
Feingold was born in Hazleton, Pennsylvania, in 1930. He was a graduate of Jefferson Medical School (now Thomas Jefferson University) in Philadelphia, Pennsylvania. He has served on the faculty of Tufts University School of Medicine, Harvard Medical School, and Boston University School of Medicine. He previously served as chief of the division of ambulatory services and chief of genetics and birth defects at Boston Floating Hospital for Children and director of genetics at Franciscan Children's Hospital and Rehabilitation Center. Feingold was the medical editor at CBS Boston WBZ-TV and WBZ Radio for 30 years. He died on July 17, 2015, three days shy of his 85th birthday.

Feingold syndrome was named after him, as he was the first to describe it in the medical literature in 1975

== Publications ==
- Genetics and Birth Defects in Clinical Practice, a standard medical textbook, co-author.
- Normal values for selected physical parameters: an aid to syndrome delineation.

Feingold authored 180 articles that have been published in the medical literature. He described three genetic syndromes, one bearing his name, Feingold syndrome. He wrote a weekly newspaper column entitled "Second Opinion" that appeared in 80 newspapers. Feingold also had a daily medical feature on WBZ-CBS Radio in Boston entitled "Medical Minute."
