= Nathan Cohn =

American electrical engineer

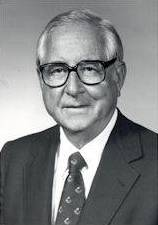
- Born: January 2, 1907; Hartford, Connecticut
- Died: November 16, 1989 (aged 82)
- Education: Massachusetts Institute of Technology
- Awards: IEEE Edison Medal (1982); John Price Wetherill Medal

Nathan Cohn (January 2, 1907 – November 16, 1989) was an American electrical engineer best known for his work in the development of automatic control techniques for interconnected electric power systems. He worked for Leeds & Northrup for 48 years.

== Biography ==
Nathan Cohn was born on January 2, 1907, in Hartford, Connecticut. He received an S.B. in electrical engineering from the Massachusetts Institute of Technology in 1927.

Upon graduation, Cohn began working for the Leeds & Northrup Company. He worked within the Instrumentation and Controls for Electric Power Application Division. Cohn served as manager of the company’s offices in San Francisco and Chicago until 1955 when he returned to Philadelphia to serve as manager of the Market Development Division. He was named Vice President of Technical Affairs in 1958, Senior Vice President in 1968, and Executive Vice President for Research and Corporate Development in 1967 until his retirement from the position in 1972. He also served on the Board of Directors from 1963-1975 when he retired as corporate director.

Cohn was a member of Eta Kappa Nu, Sigma Xi, and Tau Beta Pi. He died on November 16, 1989, in Scottsdale, Arizona.

== Honors and awards ==
- IEEE Edison Medal in 1982
- Fellow, IEEE
- Fellow, Franklin Institute
- Member, National Academy of Engineering (1969)
- IEEE Lamme Medal (1968)
