= Interactive Entertainment Merchants Association =

Non-profit organization

The Interactive Entertainment Merchants Association (IEMA) was a United States–based non-profit organization dedicated to serving the business interests of leading retailers that sell Interactive entertainment software (including video games, multimedia entertainment, peripherals and other software). Member companies of the IEMA collectively accounted for approximately seventy-five percent of the $10 billion annual interactive entertainment business in the United States. The association was established in 1997 by Hal Halpin, its president and founder, and counts among its member companies the largest retailers of games including Walmart, Target Corporation, Blockbuster Entertainment and Circuit City. The IEMA also sponsored an important annual trade show in the promotion of the business of the video game industry called the "Executive Summit".

In April 2006, the Interactive Entertainment Merchants Association merged with the Video Software Dealers Association to form the Entertainment Merchants Association (EMA).

== Ratings ==
The IEMA was largely responsible for the acceptance and industry wide adoption of the self-regulatory ESRB ratings system, having endorsed it and subsequently required software publishers to rate all games in order to have their product sold on store shelves. The IEMA had also worked with parallel trade groups in the business including the Entertainment Software Association (ESA) in defeating laws that would prohibit the sale of Mature-rated games to minors. The group instead voluntarily committed to carding policies and procedures, requiring Government-issued photo identification, for all M-rated games - in much the same way that movie theatres voluntarily ask for ID for admittance to R-rated movies.

== Box standardization ==
The IEMA played a major role in improving, from a retailer's perspective, the way most PC games are packaged. In 2000, many retailers were becoming disenchanted with the salability of PC games as compared with their more profitable console game counterparts as products. Oversized software boxes were blamed for a lack of productivity per square foot (the profitability of a particular item sold at retail based upon its foot print). The IEMA worked with leading game publishers in creating the now-standard IEMA-sized box, essentially a double-thick DVD-sized plastic or cardboard box, which effectively increased the profitability per square foot by over 33% and appeased merchants and developers alike.

== PC identification mark ==
In creating the new box size the IEMA found itself in the unlikely position of platform guardian (where each console platform had a first-party publisher to oversee standardization matters, PC games by their very nature did not). As such, the industry pressured the organization to develop a platform identification mark which would unify the display and focus the customer's brand perception. Again the IEMA worked with publishers to create a new standard "PC" icon, and would provide its use on a royalty-free basis to the industry.

== Charitable work ==
As part of the contract that computer game publishers must sign in order to use the PC icon(s), they agreed to provide three finished copies of each game that they create which uses one or more of the trademarks, as is standard practice. The IEMA chose to use the influx of new software to re-launch the video game industry's first charitable organization, Games for Good. GfG essentially acts as a repository for the games business. It receives in donated items and redistributes them to partner charities: children's hospitals, shelters, schools and other appropriate non-profit institutions.

== Representation ==
In addition to its roles above the IEMA handled lobbying and legislative efforts with regard to First Amendment matters which concern its members. Association executives routinely testified before State and Federal agencies and committees on behalf of the game industry, as well as providing representation to the media and speaking on behalf of channel-oriented perspectives at trade shows and conferences. The IEMA worked on both inter and intra-industry matters for its members including RFID, Source-tagging, Organized Retail Crime Loss prevention, digital distribution.

== Controversy ==
The IEMA had been accused of not following through on promises made with regard to stemming the sale of Mature-rated games to minors. The Federal Trade Commission (FTC) as well as special interest groups including the National Institute on Media and the Family (NIMF) have performed sting operations on IEMA member company stores and found that retailers continue to sell M-rated games to children. Critics claim that the organization makes public statements that are meant to appease law-makers and the press but does not follow through with penalties imposed upon members which run afoul of their commitment. They would furthermore like to see the IEMA more directly involved with its membership in educating store-level staff about the ESRB ratings system. Others have praised the association for its swift response to the 2005 Grand Theft Auto: San Andreas Hot Coffee minigame controversy, in which the rating for the game was changed from "M" to "AO" (Adults Only). Upon receiving notification of the change, all IEMA retailers removed the product from store shelves within 24 hours.

== See also ==
- Censorship
- Censorship in the United States
- Entertainment Software Association
- MPAA film rating system, the U.S. film industry equivalent to ESRB
- Video game controversy
