= OTT.X =

International trade association

OTT.X is a Los Angeles-based not-for-profit international trade association dedicated to advancing the interests of companies and organizations involved in over-the-top (OTT) media distribution and its related technologies.

Prior to its refocusing on OTT, OTT.X was known as the Entertainment Merchants Association (EMA). The mission of the EMA was to promote, protect, and provide a forum for, the common business interests of those engaged in the sale, rental, and licensed reproduction of entertainment software, such as motion pictures, video games, and sound recordings.

== History ==
The Entertainment Merchants Association was established in April 2006 through the merger of the Interactive Entertainment Merchants Association (IEMA) and the Video Software Dealers Association (VSDA). VSDA was organized in 1981 to help video retail stores fight against federal legislation that would have changed the first-sale doctrine. VSDA was initiated under the auspices of NARM (National Association of Recording Merchandisers), and was originally headed by Mickey Granberg, who was executive vice-president and staff head of both organizations until she retired in 1989. VSDA separated from NARM in 1991 and moved its headquarters from southern New Jersey to Encino, Calif. in 1993-1994.

On January 17, 2020, the Entertainment Merchants Association became OTT.X.

== Composition ==
As of 2024, there are 122 members who fall into the categories of retailers/channels/networks/platforms, content providers, service and technology providers, and universities. Plex is the sole member with Gold membership status. Other well-established members include Prime Video, BBC Studios, Crackle, Fandango Media, Gracenote, LG, Magnolia Home Entertainment, Roku, Shout! Studios, Sony Pictures, TelevisaUnivision, and Vizio.

EMA represented more than 1,000 companies throughout the United States, Canada, and other nations. Its members operated more than 20,000 retail outlets in the U.S. that sold and/or rented DVDs and computer and console video games. Membership comprised the full spectrum of retailers (from single-store specialists to multi-line mass merchants), distributors, the home video divisions of major and independent motion picture studios, video game publishers, and other related businesses that constitute and support the home entertainment industry.

== Legal activity ==
- Brown v. Entertainment Merchants Association, 564 U.S. 08 (2011).
