= Video game censorship =

In video games, censorship are efforts by an authority to limit access, censor content, or regulate video games or specific video games due to the nature of their content. Some countries will do this to protect younger audiences from inappropriate content using rating systems such as the ESRB rating system. Others will do this to censor any negative outlook on a nation's government.

== Overview ==
Support for video game regulation has at times been linked to moral panic. Even so, governments have enacted, or have tried to enact, legislation that regulates distribution of video games through censorship based on content rating systems or banning. In 2005, David Gauntlett claimed that grant funding, news headlines, and professional prestige more commonly go to authors who, in good faith, promote anti-media beliefs. Tom Grimes, James A. Anderson, and Lori Bergen reiterated these claims in a 2008 book examining sociological effects on the production of media effects research.

=== Voluntary regulation ===
Voluntary rating systems adopted by the video game industry, such as the ESRB rating system in the United States and Canada (established in 1994), and the Pan European Game Information (PEGI) rating system in Europe (established in 2003), are aimed at informing parents about the types of games their children are playing (or are asking to play). Some ratings of controversial games indicate they are not targeted at young children ("Mature" (M) or "Adults Only" (AO) in the US, or 15 or 18 in the UK). The packaging warns such games should not be sold to children. In the US, ESRB ratings are not legally binding, but many retailers take it upon themselves to refuse the sale of these games to minors. In the United Kingdom (UK), the BBFC ratings are legally binding. UK retailers also enforce the PEGI ratings, which are not legally binding.

== Canada ==
The Ontario Film Review Board and the British Columbia Film Classification Office respectively prohibited the sale of Manhunt and Soldier of Fortune to customers under the age of 18, notwithstanding their ESRB "Mature" ratings, by legally classifying them as films and giving them a "Restricted" rating. Ontario, as well as several other provinces, have since adopted laws that allow the ESRB ratings system to be enforceable by law, primarily by making it unlawful for retailers to sell "Mature" or "Adults Only" rated games to customers who are not appropriately-aged.

== China ==
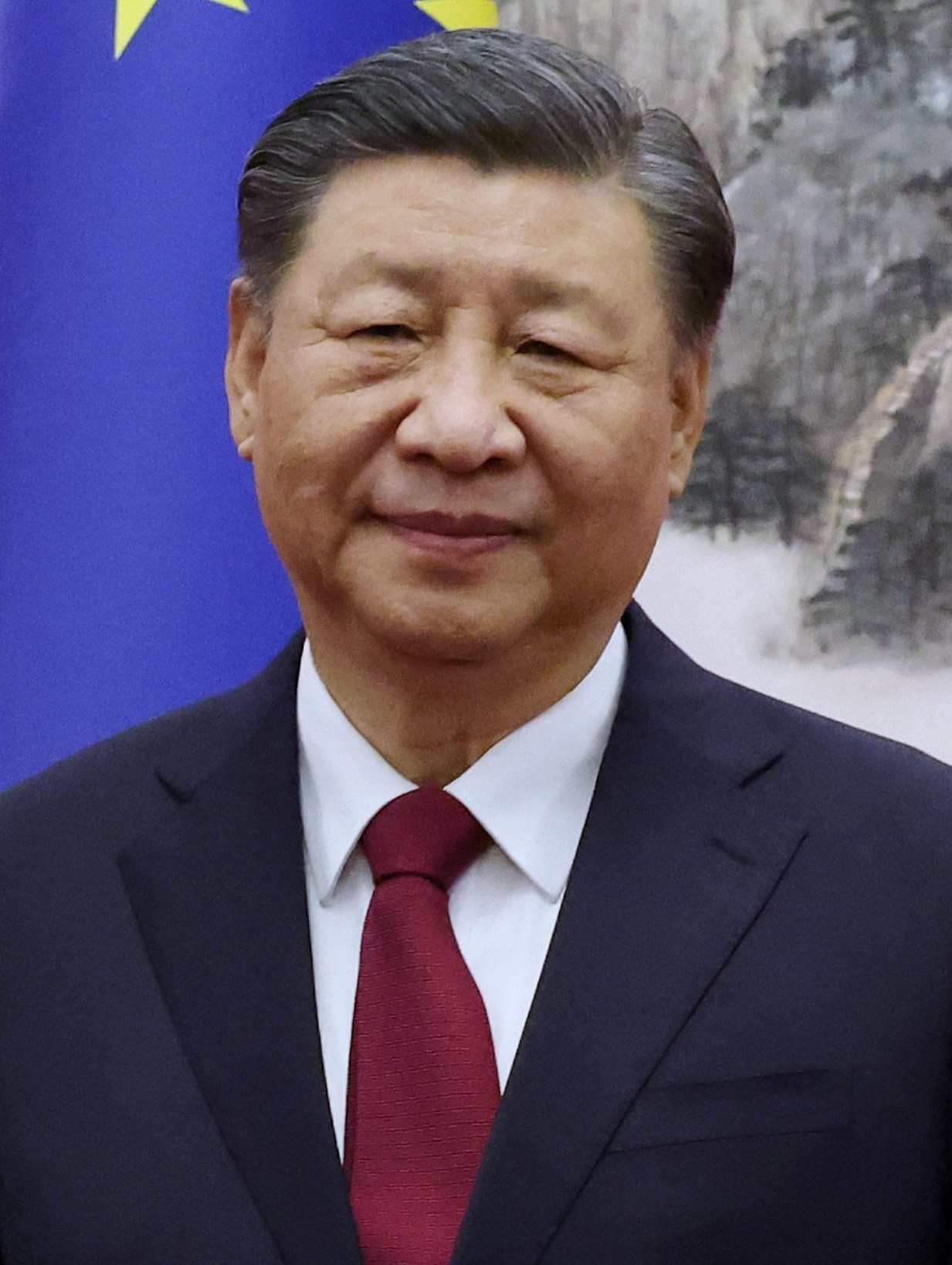
Xi Jinping, General Secretary of the Chinese Communist Party since 2012

Video game consoles were banned in Mainland China in June 2000. This ban was finally lifted in January 2014. However, the Chinese would still police video games which would be "hostile to China or not in conformity with the outlook of China's government". Reported by Bloomberg, metaphorically speaking, Cai Wu, head of China's Ministry of Culture, said "We want to open the window a crack to get some fresh air, but we still need a screen to block the flies and mosquitoes.".

Several video games have been banned in China due to unfavorable views on war, history, and government. In 2004, Hearts of Iron was banned as the Ministry of Culture deemed the games portrayal of World War II to be distorted. In 2013, the Chinese Ministry banned Battlefield 4 as they claimed it misrepresented China and was an attempt to "smears China's image". The character of Winnie-the-Pooh has been heavily censored in China's video games, as the characters has been frequently used in mocking comparisons to General Secretary of the Chinese Communist Party Xi Jinping.

Display of blood in Chinese game industry is strictly limited, if not banned. Before 2019, blood in many games cannot be red. The new ban prohibits the presence of any blood.

In addition, chat in Chinese video games is subject to similar or even wider restrictions as elsewhere on the Chinese Internet. For example, the chat in the English-language version of Genshin Impact censors not only swear words but also words such as Taiwan, Tibet, Hong, Kong, Falun Gong, Stalin, Hitler and Putin. A study of about 200 Chinese games found out that over 180,000 words have been subject to blacklisting.

In most cases, censorship related to China is limited to games developed in China or in Chinese versions of western games. In the 2020s, with increasing worldwide popularity of Chinese-developed games, such as with Marvel Rivals or Black Myth: Wukong, there has been more awareness of such censorship by the larger player community.

== Germany ==
=== Unterhaltungssoftware Selbstkontrolle ===
In Germany, the Unterhaltungssoftware Selbstkontrolle (Entertainment Software Self-Regulation) has been responsible for assigning age ratings for video games since 1994. In the past, particularly violent games were often censored by the developer or publisher in order to receive a lower rating and avoid indexing. The USK's review of a game is voluntary, but games without approval may only be offered and sold to adults.

One notable example of censorship in Germany is that of Call of Duty: WWII. In the German version of the game, swastika symbols are removed and replaced with Iron Crosses. Another censored video game in Germany was Wolfenstein II: The New Colossus, where Hitler's famous mustache was removed and swastikas were replaced with triangular symbols.

On August 9, 2018, USK announced that the German government will relax this Section § 86a restriction on video games, as long as the imagery included falls within the "social adequacy" allowance. USK will still evaluate how this imagery is used and reject games they believe fail to meet the social adequacy allowance. In November 2019, several sequels from Wolfenstein series became uncensored in Germany.

=== Bundeszentrale für Kinder- und Jugendmedienschutz ===
In Germany video games can be indexed by the Bundeszentrale für Kinder- und Jugendmedienschutz (Federal Agency for Child and Youth Protection in the Media) on the government side. Games that have been added on the list of media harmful to minors are subject to strict restrictions and may not be offered or sold to children and young people, this also applies to the advertising of games. Common reasons for indexing were the depiction and glorification of violence, war or National Socialism. Since 2003, games with a USK approval can no longer be indexed, and list entries must also be re-examined after 25 years. Since the mid-2010s, the number of newly indexed games has declined and the number of games being deleted from the list has increased, including many games that were deleted prematurely at the request of the publisher.

A significant turning point was the rejection of an indexing of Mortal Kombat X and the granting of an 18+ rating by the USK. Mortal Kombat X was the first part of the series to receive approval from the USK in Germany; until then, many titles in the series had been indexed or even confiscated.

=== Strafgesetzbuch ===
The German Strafgesetzbuch (Criminal Code) in § 86 outlaws the dissemination of propaganda material of unconstitutional and terrorist organisations, § 86a the use of symbols of unconstitutional organisations, § 130 Volksverhetzung (agitation of the people), and § 130a instructions for crimes. In the official lists, these four sections are always bundled, so any game that contains swastika flags and/or any depiction of Adolf Hitler is listed alongside racist propaganda pieces.

§ 131 outlaws representation of excessive violence in media "which describe cruel or otherwise inhuman acts of violence against human or humanoid beings in a manner which expresses a glorification or rendering harmless of such acts of violence or which represents the cruel or inhuman aspects of the event in a manner which injures human dignity."

== Japan ==
Japan's game regulatory system is CERO for home video games and EOCS, JCRC for pornographic games.

== South Korea ==
"Indecent" websites, such as those offering unrated games, any kind of pornography, and gambling, are also blocked. Attempts to access these sites are automatically redirected to the warning page showing Korean-language text that translates to "This site is legally blocked by government regulations." Search engines are required to verify age for some keywords deemed "inappropriate" for minors.

== Mexico ==
Mexico voluntarily adopted the ESRB rating system for rating video games.

== United States and territories ==
The United States, Puerto Rico, Samoa, Guam, Virgin Islands, and Northern Mariana Islands all voluntarily comply with the ESRB rating system.

=== History ===
The first major controversy over video games in the United States was in the early 1990s, when games such as Mortal Kombat and Night Trap released, which were known for scenes that would be considered too violent or too sexual for kids. The issue regarding video games eventually made it into the United States Congress. After a proposal to have a government commission to establish video game ratings, the Interactive Digital Software Association was established by major video game corporations and presented the Entertainment Software Ratings Board (ESRB) to the Congress, which was approved and would become the standard of video game ratings.

Jack Thompson has criticized "violent video games", claiming that playing violent video games leads to teenagers replicating those behaviors in the real world. He often represented victims or parents of victims in cases regarding shootings, usually blaming the actions on the perpetrator having played violent video games. Thompson also supported a campaign that tried to stop the release of Bully.

In 2013, the Entertainment Software Association, the lobbying group for the video games industry, had enlisted over 500,000 members to the "Video Game Voters Network," a "grassroots" lobbying group to mobilize gamers to act against public policy that may negatively impact the gaming industry. The VGV was launched in 2006 by the ESA, and uses social media sites like Facebook and Twitter to inform members of allies and opponents. In 2013, the ESA spent over US$3.9 Million on lobbying, including but not limited to against VVG legislation. This included opposing a bipartisan federal bill that would direct the National Academy of Sciences to study the effects of all forms of violent media. Such bills themselves had come under criticisms from some scholars for pressuring scientists to find specific outcomes rather than studying the issues neutrally

=== US government legislation ===
The regulation of video games have been historically supported by politicians such as Joe Lieberman and Hillary Clinton, who have pushed legislation for regulating video games.

No video game console manufacturer has allowed any game marked AO to be published in North America; however, the PC gaming service Steam has allowed AO titles such as Hatred to be published on its platform. No major retailers are willing to sell AO-rated games, although the immensely popular PlayStation 2 game Grand Theft Auto: San Andreas was briefly rated AO after the presence of the Hot Coffee add-on became evident. The add-on was later removed, with the game's rating returning to M. In the 109th Congress and 110th Congress, the Video Games Enforcement Act was introduced to the US House of Representatives. The act required an identification check for the purchase of M and AO rated games. The bill and others like it did not succeed because of likely First Amendment violations. Although no law mandates identification checking for games with adult content, a 2008 survey by the Federal Trade Commission showed that video game retailers have voluntarily increased ID verification for M- and AO-rated games, and sales of those games to underage potential buyers decreased from 83% in 2000 to 20% in 2008. A further survey in April 2011, found that video game retailers continued to enforce the ratings by allowing only 13% of underage teenage shoppers to buy M-rated video games, a statistically significant decrease from the 20% purchase rate in 2009.

On 7 January 2009, Joe Baca, representative of California's 43rd District, introduced H.R. 231, the Video game health labelling act. This bill called for a label to be placed in a "clear and conspicuous location on the packaging" on all video games with an ESRB rating of T (Teen) or higher stating, "WARNING: Excessive exposure to violent video games and other violent media has been linked to aggressive behavior." The proposed legislation was referred to the Subcommittee on Commerce, Trade and Consumer Protection. On 24 January 2011, Joe Baca reintroduced the Video game health labelling act as H.R. 400 of the 112th Congress. The bill was once again passed onto the subcommittee.

On 27 June 2011, the Supreme Court of the United States ruled on Brown v. Entertainment Merchants Association. Video games were protected speech under the First Amendment. The case centered on a California law that sought to restrict sales of violent video games to minors. The video game industry, led by the Entertainment Merchants Association and the Entertainment Software Association, successfully obtained an injunction on the bill, believing that the definition of violence as stated in the California law was too vague and would not treat video games as protected speech. This opinion was upheld in lower courts, and supported by the Supreme Court's decision. The majority of the justices did not consider the studies brought to their attention as convincing evidence of harm, and stated that they could not create a new class of restricted speech that was not applied to other forms of media. However, Justice Breyer's minority decision found the evidence more convincing.

Deana Pollard Sacks, Brad Bushman, and Craig A. Anderson objected to the ruling, claiming that the thirteen experts who authored the Statement on Video Game Violence on the Brown side were considerably more academically merited, and had on average authored over 28 times as many peer-reviewed journal articles about aggression/violence based on original empirical research as the signatories supporting the EMA, whereas the over 100 signatories supporting Brown had on average authored over 14 times as many. Richard Hall, Ryan Hall, and Terri Day replied: "It is not surprising that Anderson and Bushman found their own qualifications and the qualifications of those who agree with them to be superior to the qualifications of those who disagree with them", and claimed that they might have used methodology which have undercounted contributions of some scholars. On 3 April 2013, Dianne Feinstein, a Californian senator and Democrat, spoke in San Francisco to a group of 500 constituents about gun violence. She said video games have "a very negative role for young people, and the industry ought to take note of that" and that Congress might have to step in if the video games industry did not cease to glorify guns.

== See also ==
- List of banned video games
- List of controversial video games
- List of regionally censored video games
- Video game controversies
