= Video game controversies =

There have been many debates on the social effects of video games on players and broader society, alongside debates within the video game industry. Since the early 2000s, advocates of video games have emphasized their use as an expressive medium, arguing for their protection under the laws governing freedom of speech and as an educational tool. Detractors argue that video games are harmful and therefore should be subject to legislative oversight and restrictions. The characteristics and effects of video games are the subject of scientific study. Academic research has examined the links between video games and addiction, aggression, violence, social development, and a variety of stereotyping and sexual morality issues.

== Areas of controversy ==
=== Publicized incidents of violence caused by video games ===
Public concern over the potential promotion of violent behavior by video games has led a number of cases to become popular and publicized. Many researchers argue over if a link between video game violence is founded or faulty.

==== In the United States ====
On 22 November 1997, Noah Wilson, age 13, died when his friend, Yancy, stabbed him in the chest with a kitchen knife. Wilson's mother, Andrea Wilson, alleged her son was stabbed to death because of an obsession with the 1995 Midway game Mortal Kombat 3; that Yancy was so obsessed with the game that he believed himself to be the character, Cyrax, who uses a finishing move which Wilson claims involves taking the opponent in a headlock and stabbing them in the chest, despite the fact that Cyrax has never used this Fatality in any game he has appeared in. The court found "Wilson's complaint fails to state a claim upon which relief can be granted."

There have also been alleged video game-related crimes which took place at schools. On 24 March 1998, 13-year-old Mitchell Johnson and 11-year-old Andrew Golden killed four students and a teacher in the 1998 Westside Middle School shooting. Although no connection to video games was drawn by the press at the time, the case was re-examined by commentators a year later, subsequent to the events of the Columbine High School massacre, and it was determined that the two boys had often played GoldenEye 007 together and they enjoyed playing first-person shooter games.

On 20 April 1999, Eric Harris and Dylan Klebold killed 12 students, a teacher, and themselves in the Columbine High School massacre. The two were allegedly obsessed with the video game Doom. Harris also created WADs for the game, and created a large mod named "Tier" which he called his "life's work". Contrary to rumor, however, neither student had made a Doom level mimicking the school's layout, and there is no evidence the pair practiced the massacre in Doom.

===== 2000s =====
Controversy related to video games was sparked again in November 2001, when twenty-one-year-old Shawn Woolley committed suicide in a state his mother described as an addiction to EverQuest. Woolley's mother said:

"I think the way the game is written is that when you first start playing it, it is fun, and you make great accomplishments. And then the further you get into it, the higher level you get, the longer you have to stay on it to move onward, and then it isn't fun anymore. But by then you're addicted, and you can't leave it."

Later video game controversies centered on whether some murderers were inspired by crime simulators. In February 2003, 16-year-old American Dustin Lynch was charged with aggravated murder. He pleaded insanity in that he was obsessed with Grand Theft Auto III. Jack Thompson, attorney and opponent of video games, (Note: Permanently disbarred since October 2008.) offered to represent Lynch. Thompson encouraged the father of the victim to pass a note to the judge that read "the attorneys had better tell the jury about the violent video game that trained this kid [and] showed him how to kill our daughter, JoLynn. If they don't, I will." Lynch later retracted his insanity plea. His mother, Jerrilyn Thomas, said:

"It has nothing to do with video games or Paxil, and my son's no murderer,"

He pled guilty to the charges against the advice of his attorney in December 2003.

On 7 June 2003, 18-year-old American Devin Moore shot and killed two policemen and a dispatcher after grabbing one of the officers' weapons following an arrest for the possession of a stolen vehicle. At trial, the defense claimed that Moore had been inspired by the video game Grand Theft Auto: Vice City.

On 25 June 2003, two American step brothers, Joshua and William Buckner, aged 14 and 16, respectively, used a rifle to fire at vehicles on Interstate 40 in Tennessee, killing a 45-year-old man and wounding a 19-year-old woman. The two shooters told investigators they had been inspired by Grand Theft Auto III.

In April 2007, a 17-year-old high school senior was expelled from Clements High School in Sugar Land, Texas for recreating his high school inside Counter-Strike: Global Offensive (CS:GO). The school determined the incident to be a Level 3 threat, used to mark imminent terrorist threat to the school. The student's home was searched by police and had 5 swords confiscated by the authorities. The school board of trustees was split on if expulsion was the proper course of action for the situation.

In June 2007, 22-year-old Texan Alejandro Garcia shot and killed his cousin after arguing over whose turn it was to play the game Scarface: The World Is Yours. He pleaded guilty at his murder trial on 6 April 2011, and was sentenced to 15 to 30 years in prison.

In September 2007, in Ohio, 16-year-old Daniel Petric sneaked out of his bedroom window to purchase the game Halo 3 against the orders of his father, a minister at New Life Assembly of God in Wellington, Ohio, His parents eventually banned him from the game after he spent up to 18 hours a day with it, and secured it in a lockbox in a closet where the father also kept a 9mm handgun according to prosecutors. In October 2007, Daniel used his father's key to open the lockbox and remove the gun and the game. He then entered the living room of his house and shot both of them in the head, killing his mother and wounding his father. Petric was sentenced to life with a minimum of 23 years in prison. Defense attorneys argued that Petric was influenced by video game addiction. The court dismissed these claims. The judge, James Burge, commented that while he thought there was ample evidence the boy knew what he was doing, Burge thought the game had affected him like a drug, saying "I firmly believe that Daniel Petric had no idea at the time he hatched this plot that if he killed his parents they would be dead forever."

In December 2007, 17-year-old Lamar Roberts and his 16-year-old girlfriend, Heather Trujillo, were accused of beating a 7-year-old girl to death. They were said to have been imitating the content of Mortal Kombat. In July 2008, Heather was sentenced to 18 years in prison and 6 years in a youth-offender program, and, on 16 January 2009, Lamar was sentenced to 36 years in prison.

In June 2008, four teens allegedly obsessed with Grand Theft Auto IV went on a crime spree after being in New Hyde Park, New York. They first robbed a man, knocking out his teeth and then they stopped a woman driving a black BMW and stole her car and her cigarettes.

In April 2009, Joseph Johnson III was charged with murder after shooting his friend, Danny Taylor, during a quarrel over a video game in Taylor's apartment in Chicago, Illinois.

===== 2010s =====
In January 2010, 9-year-old Anthony Maldonado was stabbed to death by his 25-year-old relative, Alejandro Morales, after an argument regarding Maldonado's recently purchased copy of Tony Hawk: Ride and a PlayStation 3 console.

On 29 November 2010 in South Philadelphia, Pennsylvania, a 16-year-old boy, Kendall Anderson, bludgeoned his mother to death in her sleep with a claw hammer after she took away his PlayStation.

On 24 March 2012, 13-year-old Noah Crooks was accused of shooting Gretchen, his 32-year-old mother, dead with a .22 caliber rifle after a failed attempt to rape her. He was charged with first-degree murder and assault. During the dispatch call to 911 shortly after the murder, Crooks revealed that his mother had taken away his Call of Duty video game because his grades had turned poor and that this was the reason why he snapped. According to dispatch, Crooks did not seem emotional even though he had killed his mother a couple of hours earlier. In 2016, Crooks was sentenced to 50 years in prison.

===== Sandy Hook =====
After the Sandy Hook Elementary School shooting on 14 December 2012, initial media reports misidentified the shooter as Ryan Lanza, the brother of the actual perpetrator. After discovering that Ryan had liked Mass Effect on Facebook, an internet mob immediately attacked the game's Facebook page, labelling its developers "child killers". Once it was discovered that it was his brother who had carried out the massacre, early news stories about Adam claimed a link to between his actions and obsessively playing other video games such as StarCraft and Dance Dance Revolution. After a UK tabloid claimed that Lanza had an obsession with the violent Call of Duty and Dynasty Warriors game series which he owned some titles from, this became widely repeated across the internet, although many fans of these series disputed the claims.

Subsequently, representatives of Southington, Connecticut, a small town near Sandy Hook, organized the collection and potential burning of violent video games in exchange for gift certificates, although they also took music and movies deemed harmful. A report by CBS claimed that anonymous law enforcement sources suggested a link to video games, which was later dismissed by the Connecticut police, saying that it was "all speculation".

However, the incident prompted a wave of legislative and bureaucratic efforts against violent video games in the following months, including a meeting between US vice president Joe Biden and representatives from the video game industry on the topic of video game violence. The official investigation report, released on 25 November 2013, discussed video games only briefly in the 48-page document and did not suggest they contributed to Lanza's motive. The report revealed that Lanza played a variety of video games, although he was most fond of non-violent video games such as Dance Dance Revolution and Super Mario Brothers. The report particularly focused on Dance Dance Revolution which he played regularly, for hours, and at times with an associate.

On 22 August 2013, 90-year-old Marie Smothers was shot dead by her 8-year-old grandson after the boy had been playing Grand Theft Auto IV. As the boy lived in Louisiana, he was considered too young to be charged.

In the wake of the El Paso, Texas shooting on 3 August, and the Dayton, Ohio shooting on 4 August in 2019, President Donald Trump partially attributed the shootings to video games. Trump stated "We must stop the glorification of violence in our society. This includes the gruesome and grisly video games that are now commonplace. It is too easy today for troubled youth to surround themselves with a culture that celebrates violence." Similar concerns were raised by House Minority Leader Kevin McCarthy.

==== Outside the United States ====
In April 2000, a Spanish 16-year-old, José Rabadán Pardo, murdered his father, mother, and sister with a katana, proclaiming that he was on an "avenging mission" for Squall Leonhart, the main character of the video game Final Fantasy VIII.

On 27 February 2004, in Leicester, England, 17-year-old Warren Leblanc lured 14-year-old Stefan Pakeerah into a park and murdered him by stabbing him repeatedly with a claw hammer and a knife. Leblanc was reportedly obsessed with Manhunt, later, reports claimed that police had found a copy of the game in Leblanc's bedroom. The victim's mother, Giselle Pakeerah, has been campaigning against violent video games in the UK ever since. The police investigating the case have dismissed any link.

In October 2004, a 41-year-old Chinese man named Qiu Chengwei stabbed 26-year-old Zhu Caoyuan to death over a dispute regarding the sale of a virtual weapon the two had jointly won in the game The Legend of Mir 3.

On 27 December 2004, 13-year-old Xiao Yi committed suicide by jumping from a twenty-four story building in Tianjin, China, as a result of the effects of his video game addiction, hoping to be "reunited" with his fellow gamers in the afterlife, according to his suicide notes. Prior to his death, he had spent thirty-six consecutive hours playing Warcraft III.

In August 2005, 28-year-old South Korean Lee Seung Seop died after continuously playing StarCraft for 50 hours.

In September 2007, a Chinese man in Guangzhou, China, died after playing internet video games for three consecutive days in an internet cafe.

In December 2007, a Russian man was beaten to death over an argument about Lineage II. The man was killed when his guild and a rival challenged each other to a real-life brawl.

On 2 August 2008, Polwat Chinno, a 19-year-old Thai teenager, stabbed and killed a Bangkok taxi driver during an attempt to steal the driver's cab in order to obtain money to buy a copy of Grand Theft Auto IV. A police official said that the teen was trying to copy a similar act in the game. As a consequence, officials ordered the banning of the game and later the series, which led its distributor, New Era Interactive Media, to withdraw it, including its installment, from shops across Thailand.

On 13 October 2008, the disappearance of Brandon Crisp and his subsequent death involved, according to his parents, obsessive playing of Call of Duty 4: Modern Warfare has been referenced in discussions about video game obsession and spawned a report aired by CBC's The Fifth Estate TV show on video game addiction and Crisp's story titled "Top Gun", subtitled "When a video gaming obsession turns to addiction and tragedy".

===== 2010s =====
In Manchester in January 2010, Gary Alcock punched, slapped and pinched his partner's 15-month-old daughter in the three weeks leading up to her death before he delivered a fatal blow to the stomach which tore her internal organs because she interrupted him playing his Xbox. She died from internal bleeding after suffering thirty-five separate injuries including multiple bruises, rib fractures and brain damage, which were comparable to injuries suffered in a car crash. Alcock was jailed for life and must serve at least 21 years.

In May 2010, French gamer Julien Barreaux located and stabbed a fellow player known only as "Mikhael" who had stabbed Barreaux in the game Counter-Strike 6 months earlier. The judge at his trial called him "a menace to society".

On 9 April 2011 in Alphen aan den Rijn, the Netherlands, 24-year-old Tristan van der Vlis opened fire in a shopping mall, firing more than a hundred times with a semi-automatic rifle and a handgun, killing 6 people and wounding 17 others, after which he also killed himself. A fair amount of attention was given to Van Der Vlis' playing of Call of Duty: Modern Warfare 2 and to the alleged similarities between the events in Alphen a/d Rijn and the controversial "No Russian" mission in the game, where the player can choose to partake in the killing of a large group of innocent people inside an airport terminal.

On 22 July 2011, Anders Behring Breivik perpetrated the 2011 Norway attacks, detonating a car bomb in the executive government quarter, and then travelled to a summer camp for teenagers, where he proceeded to stalk and kill a large number of people. Seventy-seven people were killed in the attacks, a majority of them being teenagers who were at the summer camp. Hundreds were injured by the car bomb explosion. Breivik himself claimed in court that he had deliberately used the 2009 video game Call of Duty: Modern Warfare 2 to train for the attacks, specifically by practicing his aim using a "holographic aiming device". He stated in his manifesto that he had been planning the attacks since 2002.

On the night of 14 April 2012, in Clydebank, Scotland, a 13-year-old boy slashed his friend's throat after a session of Gears of War 3. The wound was deep enough to expose his trachea and required 20 staples after his surgery. In March 2013, Brian Docherty, a chairman of the Scottish Police Federation, commented that "These games are rated 18 and shouldn't be played by children of this young age" and that "We need to look again at what we can do to [prevent children from playing games meant for adults]." Similar and other effects were denounced in 2004 by Gary Webb in his article The Killing Game, exposing the use of increased reality video games by the US Army.

In February 2018, after 15-year-old Ben Walmsley of Greater Manchester, England, committed suicide, his father Darren stated that he believed the visual novel Doki Doki Literature Club! may have contributed to "dragging" his son into a dark place, due to a subplot of the game involving two characters (Sayori and Yuri) suffering from depression who independently commit suicide. Walmsley also claimed that Ben had been frequently awoken at night due to text messages he attributed as coming from the game's characters, despite no such function existing in the game. In June 2018, the controversy was discussed by Victoria Derbyshire on BBC News, and she called the game a "risk to children" and thought it should've had a higher age rating. The game being blamed for Walmsley's death, as well as the BBC interview discussing the controversy, was met with criticism on social media, with some being sick of video games being blamed for instigating tragic events, while others thought the game's discussion on the BBC was not necessary. Darren Walmsley was also criticized for claiming the video game characters had literally been sending his son text messages due to it not being a feature in the game.

On 19 August 2022, 18-year-old Henrique Lira Trad attacked his former secondary school using a variety of weapons, including crossbows, knives, and Molotovs, injuring two teachers and a student, before being tackled by a teacher and subsequently arrested. He had reportedly spent hours before the attack playing the Japanese RPG Morimiya Middle School Shooting, in which a young girl arms herself and attacks her school, allegedly planning his would-be rampage.

=== Sexual themes ===
Tolerance of sexual themes in video games varies between nations. Controversy over sexual themes has occurred in the US. For instance, in June 2005, an entire portion of unused code was found within the main script of Grand Theft Auto: San Andreas, allowing the player to simulate sexual intercourse with the main character's girlfriends. This mode, Hot Coffee, could be accessed in the PC version via mod, and through Action Replay codes in the PS2 and Xbox versions. The scene was left on the disc and could be accessed by altering a few bytes of the game's code via a hex editor. This feature prompted the Entertainment Software Rating Board (ESRB) to change the rating of San Andreas on 20 July 2005 to "adults only". Furthermore, the game was withdrawn from sale in many stores. Rockstar Games posted a loss of $28.8 million in that financial quarter. This event was dubbed the Hot Coffee mod controversy.

In Japan, controversy over an eroge called Rape in 1989 led to the game being banned a few months after its release. The game RapeLay, a Japanese eroge with a storyline centering on the player's character stalking and raping a mother and her two daughters, also caused controversy. Campaigns against the sale of the game resulted in its being banned in many countries. RapeLay's publisher, which intended the game to be available only in Japan, withdrew it from distribution.

Since 2018, Sony has been issuing new regulations for PlayStation 4 games with sexual content and fan service. For the localized release of Senran Kagura Burst Re: Newal, "Intimacy Mode", a mode where the player can play with the characters' bodies was removed, but by comparison, the same mode that was featured in previous titles like Senran Kagura: Estival Versus and Senran Kagura: Peach Beach Splash was not removed. PC release of Burst Re: Newal was not changed. The PS4 release of Nekopara Vol. 1 was censored for similar reasons, resulting in the game receiving an "E" rating by the ESRB by comparison to the "M" rating for versions on Nintendo Switch and PC. Sony claimed it was their decision to ban Omega Labyrinth Z outside of Japan due to its sexual content and nudity.

There is controversy found over Steam's lack of restrictions on games including sexual content, with articles from the National Center on Sexual Exploitation focusing on sexual content found in Steam games being too easily accessed by children.

=== Content regulation and censorship ===
Support for video game regulation has been linked to moral panic. Even so, governments have enacted or attempted to enact legislation that regulates distribution of video games through censorship based on content rating systems or banning. In 2005, David Gauntlett claimed that grant funding, news headlines, and professional prestige more commonly go to authors who, in good faith, promote anti-media beliefs. Tom Grimes, James A. Anderson, and Lori Bergen reiterated these claims in a 2008 book examining sociological effects on the production of media effects research.

In 2013, the Entertainment Software Association, the lobbying group for the video game industry, had enlisted over 500,000 members to the "Video Game Voters Network", a "grassroots" lobbying group made to mobilize gamers to act against public policy that may negatively impact the gaming industry. The VGV was launched in 2006 by the ESA, and uses social media sites like Facebook and Twitter to inform members of allies and opponents. In 2013, the ESA spent over US$3.9 million on lobbying, including but not limited to against VGV legislation. This included opposing a bipartisan federal bill that would direct the National Academy of Sciences to study the effects of all forms of violent media. Such bills themselves had come under criticisms from some scholars for pressuring scientists to find specific outcomes rather than studying the issues neutrally.

Video game consoles were banned in Mainland China in June 2000. This ban was finally lifted in January 2014. However, the Chinese Government would still police video games which would be "hostile to China or not in conformity with the outlook of China's government". Reported by Bloomberg, metaphorically speaking, Cai Wu, head of China's Ministry of Culture, said "We want to open the window a crack to get some fresh air, but we still need a screen to block the flies and mosquitoes." Display of red blood is prohibited in video games produced and sold in China.

==== Voluntary regulation ====
Voluntary rating systems adopted by the video game industry, such as the ESRB rating system in the United States and Canada (established in 1994), and the Pan European Game Information (PEGI) rating system in Europe (established in 2003), are aimed at informing parents about the types of games their children are playing (or are asking to play). Some ratings of controversial games indicate they are not targeted at young children ("Mature" (M) or "Adults Only" (AO) in the US, or 15 or 18 in the UK). The packaging warns such games should not be sold to children. In the US, ESRB ratings are not legally binding, but many retailers take it upon themselves to refuse the sale of these games to minors. In the United Kingdom (UK), the BBFC ratings are legally binding. UK retailers also enforce the PEGI ratings, which are not legally binding.

==== US government legislation ====
No video game console manufacturer has allowed any game marked AO to be published in North America; however, the PC gaming service Steam has allowed AO titles such as Hatred to be published on its platform. No major retailers are willing to sell AO-rated games. However, Grand Theft Auto: San Andreas was rated AO after the presence of the Hot Coffee add-on became evident. The add-on was later removed and the game rated M. In the 109th Congress and 110th Congress, the Video Games Enforcement Act was introduced to the US House of Representatives. The act required an identification check for the purchase of M and AO rated games. The bill and others like it did not succeed because of likely First Amendment violations. Although no law mandates identification checking for games with adult content, a 2008 survey by the Federal Trade Commission showed that video game retailers have voluntarily increased ID verification for M- and AO-rated games, and sales of those games to underage potential buyers decreased from 83% in 2000 to 20% in 2008. A further survey in April 2011, found that video game retailers continued to enforce the ratings by allowing only 13% of underage teenage shoppers to buy M-rated video games, a statistically significant decrease from the 20% purchase rate in 2009.

On 7 January 2009, Joe Baca, representative of California's 43rd District, introduced H.R. 231, the Video game health labelling act. This bill called for a label to be placed in a "clear and conspicuous location on the packaging" on all video games with an ESRB rating of T (Teen) or higher stating, "WARNING: Excessive exposure to violent video games and other violent media has been linked to aggressive behavior." The proposed legislation was referred to the Subcommittee on Commerce, Trade and Consumer Protection. On 24 January 2011, Joe Baca reintroduced the Video game health labelling act as H.R. 400 of the 112th Congress. The bill was once again passed onto the subcommittee.

On 27 June 2011, the Supreme Court of the United States ruled on Brown v. Entertainment Merchants Association. Video games were protected speech under the First Amendment. The case centered on a California law that sought to restrict sales of violent video games to minors. The video game industry, led by the Entertainment Merchants Association and the Entertainment Software Association, successfully obtained an injunction on the bill, believing that the definition of violence as stated in the California law was too vague and would not treat video games as protected speech. This opinion was upheld in lower courts, and supported by the Supreme Court's decision. The majority of the justices did not consider the studies brought to their attention as convincing evidence of harm, and stated that they could not create a new class of restricted speech that was not applied to other forms of media. However, Justice Breyer's minority decision found the evidence more convincing.

Deana Pollard Sacks, Brad Bushman, and Craig A. Anderson objected to the ruling, claiming that the thirteen experts who authored the Statement on Video Game Violence on the Brown side were considerably more academically merited, and had on average authored over 28 times as many peer-reviewed journal articles about aggression/violence based on original empirical research as the signatories supporting the EMA, whereas the over 100 signatories supporting Brown had on average authored over 14 times as many. Richard Hall, Ryan Hall, and Terri Day replied: "It is not surprising that Anderson and Bushman found their own qualifications and the qualifications of those who agree with them to be superior to the qualifications of those who disagree with them", and claimed that they might have used methodology which have undercounted contributions of some scholars. On 3 April 2013, Dianne Feinstein, a Californian senator and Democrat, spoke in San Francisco to a group of 500 constituents about gun violence. She said video games have "a very negative role for young people, and the industry ought to take note of that" and that Congress might have to step in if the video game industry did not cease to glorify guns.

=== Portrayal of religion ===
While religion is seen as a serious topic, video games are considered entertainment. As such, the use of religion and religious motifs in video games can sometimes be controversial. For example, Hitman 2: Silent Assassin (2002) sparked controversy due to a level featuring the killing of Sikhs within a depiction of their most holy site, the Harmandir Sahib.

=== Portrayal of gender ===
Some scholars have expressed the concern that video games may have the effect of reinforcing sexist stereotypes. In 1998, a study by Dietz, conducted at the University of Central Florida, found that of thirty-three games sampled, 41% did not feature female characters, 28% sexually objectified women, 21% depicted violence against women, and 30% did not represent the female population at all. Furthermore, characterizations of women tended to be stereotypical: highly sexualized ("visions of beauty with large breasts and hips"), dependent ("victim or as the proverbial Damsel in Distress"), opponents ("evil or as obstacles to the goal of the game"), and trivial ("females depicted in fairly non-significant roles"). However, the study is criticized for not including a wide range of video games for study and for including old games published up to twenty years ago which do not represent current industry standards, such as an increased presence of strong female characters.

In 2002, Kennedy considered the characteristics of the character Lara Croft in the Tomb Raider video game series. She is presented as a beautiful, clever, athletic, and brave English archaeologist-adventurer. Lara Croft has achieved popularity with both males and females as an action heroine, although depending on what perspective is applied she can either represent 'a positive role model for young girls' or a 'combination of eye and thumb candy for the boys'. Dietz's findings are supported by a survey commissioned in 2003 by Children Now. The survey found that gender stereotypes pervade most video games: male characters (52%) were more likely than females (32%) to engage in physical aggression; nearly 20% of female characters were hyper-sexualized in some way, while 35% of male characters were extremely muscular.

In 2004, the game developer, Eidos, remodeled Lara Croft for Tomb Raider: Legend. The character was modified to have a more believable figure with less revealing clothing. In 2005, Terry Flew, academic, expressed a similar opinion: gender bias and stereotyping exists in many games. Male characters are portrayed as hard bodied, muscled men while female characters are portrayed as soft bodied, nearly naked women with large breasts, portrayed in a narrowly stereotypical manner. Females are usually constructed as visual objects in need of protection who wait for male rescue, whereas men are portrayed with more power. According to Flew, such depiction of females in games reflects underlying social ideas of male dominance and themes of masculinity. Although not all video games contain such stereotypes, Flew suggests that there are enough to make it a general trait and that "...different genders have different gaming."

=== Portrayal of sexual orientation and gender identity ===
Lesbian, gay, bisexual, and transgender (LGBT) characters have been depicted in some video games since the 1980s, with Caper in the Castro in 1989 as one of the first games focusing on LGBT themes. LGBT content has been subject to changing rules and regulations by game companies. These rules are generally examples of heterosexism in that heterosexuality is normalized while homosexuality is subject to additional censorship or ridicule. Sexual orientation and gender identity were significant in some console and PC games, with the trend being toward greater visibility of LGBT identities, particularly in Japanese popular culture and games marketed to LGBT consumers.

In 2009, game company BioWare got into a controversy surrounding its moderation of a forums page for their game Star Wars: The Old Republic, where homosexual terms were censored, including the terms "gay" and "lesbian". This was explained by BioWare to be because of the world of the game, Star Wars, does not include those terms in the worldbuilding.

=== Portrayal of race, nationality, and ethnicity ===
Video games may influence the learning of young players about race and urban culture. The portrayal of race in some video games such as the Grand Theft Auto series, Custer's Revenge, 50 Cent: Bulletproof, and Def Jam: Fight for NY has been controversial. The 2002 game Grand Theft Auto: Vice City was criticized as promoting racist hate crime. The game takes place in 1986, in "Vice City", a fictionalized Miami. It involves a gang war between Haitian and Cuban refugees which involves the player's character. However, it is possible to play the game without excessive killing. The 2009 game Resident Evil 5 is set in Africa, and as such has the player kill numerous African antagonists. In response to criticism, promoters of Resident Evil 5 argued that to censor the portrayal of black antagonists was discrimination in itself.

The initial representation of Arabs and Muslims in video games was focused on portraying them as exotic, magical, and primitive through the use of the visual aesthetic of Arabian Nights and setting archeological areas as the main location of a game. With ongoing armed conflicts and wars in the 90s, video games began being made from an exclusively Non-Arab and Non-Muslim perspective while often being set in these Middle Eastern conflicts. Israeli Air Force is a video game based on the wars happening in the area in the late 1960s and late 1970s and players can raid and bomb Egypt, Syria, and Jordan. Post 9/11, the Iraq war and ISIS, war video games located in the Middle East with Arab villains and heroic White American narrators became the norm. The Arab and American characters are also differentiated through the use of weapons, American soldiers depicted using advanced weaponry while Arab soldiers are shown using different types of bombs. These narratives are seen in games such as Medal of Honor: Warfighter and Call of Duty: Black Ops II, Call of Duty: Modern Warfare 3, and Battlefield 3. These games are explicitly set in countries like Iraq, Afghanistan, and Pakistan or in places that are subtly and stereotypically supposed to portray a Middle Eastern setting. Video games representing the Middle East tend to have predominantly male Arab characters. When video games include female Arab characters, they are often presented in a sexualized manner. However, not all portrayals of Arabs and Muslims in video games are negative. Civilization IV offers players the opportunity to play from a Muslim perspective as they can choose between four Christian rulers and four Muslim rulers as their character. PeaceMaker focuses on Israelis and Palestinians, however it focuses on trying to find peace between both groups. It was inclusive of many audiences as it was produced not only in English but also Arabic and Hebrew.

There is an idea of Virtual Enfreakment found in video games, with examples in games such as Street Fighter and Tekken. This idea comes from the overexaggeration of character design aspects, specifically those that reinforce harmful stereotypes.

=== Video game impacts on youth ===
Some countries have adopted laws or regulations to limit minors' access to video games. Most notable is China, which was the first country to classify video games as having potentially addictive measures in 2008. Since 2005, China has passed regulations that are aimed to regulate how long a minor can play a video game, with new regulations imposing more stricter means to track this. As of 2019, the current Chinese law limits minors to 90 minutes of video games each weekday, and three hours on weekends. Other countries enforce content limits for video games that may be purchased by minors. The Australian Classification Board's content ratings have legal weight, preventing games that are refused classification from being sold and requiring strict checks on a purchaser's age for those given a rating of MA15+, R18+, or X18+. Germany's Unterhaltungssoftware Selbstkontrolle also has similar restrictions on retail of games that are considered harmful to minors. Otherwise, these content rating systems are used as guidelines that are otherwise not directly enforceable, but typically still practiced in retail to prevent direct sale of mature titles to minors. For example, with the U.S.'s ESRB system, retailers generally will check age identification before selling M (mature) rated games to minors, and will refuse to stock AO (Adults Only) games.

Other options to monitor and regulatе video game playing by youth are given through parental controls implemented in hardware or software. According to the Entertainment Software Association (ESA) and the Entertainment Software Rating Board (ESRB), parents believe that parental controls on gaming consoles are useful. Parents have resources they can use to gain more knowledge about the media that their children are consuming. Researchers of video game violence, Dr. Cheryl Olson and Dr. Lawrence Kutner, have compiled a list of advice for parents who want to better monitor their children. The Entertainment Software Rating Board provides easy access to the ratings of a large database of video games. Common Sense Media is a database which shows the ratings of movies, games, TV shows, and other media. For each piece of media, it lists a suggested age rating, and scales that measure positive messages, language, violence, drug use, and consumerism. It also provides a summary of the content of the media from a fellow-parent's perspective. The ESRB's website states that "Our rating system was established with the help of child development and academic experts, based on an analysis of other rating systems and what kind of information is valuable to parents. We found that consumers respond best to an age-based rating system that includes information about the content of a game. As games evolved, we found that parents place equal importance on understanding the ways in which some [video] games are played, such as interacting with others online and spending money on in-game items."

=== Alt-right and far-right associations ===
A connection between video gaming and the alt-right has been suggested, tied to the Gamergate controversy in 2014, which contributed to a culture war at that time that continued with the election of Donald Trump as United States President. The interactivity of video games may encourage players to gain enjoyment from far-right themes, which may potentially lead them to be more open to the extreme right positions, effectively being an incubator for the far right. Based on this, some alt- and far-right groups have been discovered to be organizing efforts to reach out to other players in various competitive online games and forums, typically to the younger and male ones, to indoctrinate them into their ways of thinking. Since these game chats and forums typically go unmoderated, it has been difficult to detect and prevent such recruitment from occurring. This has further been pushed by violent events, such as the 2017 Unite the Right rally where the Discord chat application developed for video game players was found to be hosting the far-right groups that were planning the rally. A 2021 report by the Institute for Strategic Dialogue found that gaming services like Steam, Discord, DLive, and Twitch had drawn groups of far-right and neo-Nazi people together in shared communities, some which try to use propaganda to recruit new members but most as a means for the multinational groups to congregate. The Institute found that Steam had the largest population of such groups, attributed to the lack of moderation used on the service's social features.

Video game advocates have challenged the notion that video games are inherently right-wing. They argue games may allow play towards what would be alt- or far-right actions, but they can also be played to more liberal goals as well, and it is how the player chooses to play that should be of concern. Advocates caution that there is a lack of scale in the concerns raised; not all games foster the environments that would promote alt-right ideals or recruits, and many games are apolitical, simply meant to be enjoyed.

=== Criminal activity, online safety, and cybersecurity ===
Other common occurrences include online casino scams, phishing, cell phone dialers, malware in illegal downloads, and money laundering. Others have found ways to use a built-in systems for illegal profit, notably the use of skin gambling tied to games like Counter-Strike: Global Offensive drew attention to how in-game virtual items could be used for gambling for real-world funds.

Players have increasingly been targeted by cybercriminals. According to cybersecurity firm Akamai, between July 2018 and June 2020, 1 in 10 of the 100 billion credential stuffing attacks recorded were targeted at the video game industry and its players, along with 1.4 in 10 of the web application attacks (152 million out of 10.6 billion). Cybercriminals attack video game players to steal their credentials, ID or data, as well as to steal payment card details or cash held in gaming accounts. Part of the motivation for attacking players is that they are seen as both a honeypot (they have something worth stealing), are a relatively vulnerable target (because many are young people or children) and some of their activities increase the opportunity to attack them (social behaviour, accessing cheats, downloading and sharing free games). Sometimes the target of attacks is not the players themselves but the companies who produce the games, with cybersecurity researchers finding over a million compromised corporate accounts of game companies in January 2021.

Cyber attacks targeted at this sector include:

- DDoS attacks - according to NexusGuard, DDoS attacks increased by 287% in Q3 2020 and 77% of these attacks targeted the online gaming and gambling industries
- Teslacrypt, a ransomware attack that stops players from playing their favourite games unless they pay.
- ESEA hack compromised 1,503,707 player profiles leaving them open to further attacks and exploitation
- Syrk, a type of ransomware attack, which was disguised as a Fortnite cheat hack and which encrypts players' files and deletes them every two hours until they pay.

=== Cheating ===
Video games have nearly always been subject to cheating by players. Early on, prior to online games, cheating had little impact on other players and was considered innocuous: players would find secret cheat codes in games typically left as testing codes by the developer (such as the Konami code that would give them numerous lives or other bonuses), or there were devices that could edit a game cartridge's memory on the fly, such as the Game Genie. Players often developed trainers to extend options and give a player additional cheats for games with more advanced personal computer games. These cheats would allow players to complete games, and rarely would have any further advantage for the player.

As multiplayer games developed which used a client-server architecture, certain players began developing a number of tools like aimbots and wallhacks that modified the game on the client side for the benefit of that player, giving them an advantage over others. With the potential to earn in-game or real-world prizes within virtual economies from online games, these tools became more sophisticated with more and more features, with developers charging money to use these tools. This in turn led to game and middleware developers creating anti-cheat technology solutions to try to detect when these tools were being used to automatically ban such players from the game. This has led to a constant battle between the game developers and publishers to eliminate cheaters from their games, and cheat creators to find new methods to bypass these automated detection tools. As these cheats often violate acceptable use policies and other conditions for using the game, developers and publishers have also been successful in litigation against cheat developers as another means to stop their use.

Related to cheating are similar means of exploiting video games for financial gains. Examples of such include gold farming, paying low-income labors to level characters or earn in-game items that can then be sold to players at a profit, and twinking or smurfing, paying skilled players to quickly level low-level characters.

=== Related to the video game industry ===
==== Workplace concerns ====
Just as with representation of women, LGBT, and minorities in video games themselves, these groups also can be marginalized within the video game development industry in Western markets. The industry is primarily made up of Caucasian, heterosexual males, according to 2017 industry studies, a result of the marketing of video games during the 70s and 80s. Experts have stressed the need to draw underrepresented groups into the industry to help developers gain broader insights for the stories and characters for video games, so that new games will appeal to the largest possible audiences. While the industry has had isolated cases where minorities reported mistreatment, there had not yet been a moment like the Me Too movement in other entertainment fields as of 2021. However, with major legal cases of sexual misconduct towards female employees at Riot Games, Ubisoft and Activision Blizzard filed from 2018 to 2021, some analysts and academics see such a watershed moment for the video game industry to be approaching.

Video game developers are considered creative professionals and thus typically do not qualify for overtime pay. Larger studios, particularly those backed by Triple A publishers, will frequently set game completion deadlines, and require employees to complete their tasks by this deadline, often requires several weeks of overtime work. This has become known as "crunch time" within the industry. While infrequent periods of crunch time are tolerated, there have been several reported cases where developers have been forced into a crunch time mode for months at a time, even well before a game's set completion deadline. Such practices have caused developers and other groups starting in 2018 to discuss unionizing within the industry and establishing reasonable limits on crunch time and other workers' rights.

The video game industry frequently has mass layoffs, with one third of U.S. game industry workers having been laid off in the last two years.

==== Lack of crediting ====
A 2015 Polygon article stated that crediting "has long been a sensitive topic in the game industry". There have been instances of employees, or even entire studios, not being listed in the credits of a game. Sometimes, this is mutually agreed upon by publishers and developers, or even desired by the developing party. In other instances, it is against their wishes, or something they reluctantly consent to because it's the only work they can get. Lack of crediting has been a contended issue since the early days of the industry. In the 1970s and 80s, Atari never credited developers, which game designer Warren Robinett said was "a power play to keep the game designers from getting recognition and therefore more bargaining power". This led Robinett to create the first well-known Easter egg in Adventure (1980) to acknowledge his authorship.

In-game credits serve as official references, and are aggregated by websites such as MobyGames and Giant Bomb. If a person is not credited, they could still include their work experience in their portfolio or CV, but they might have difficulties backing this up during a job interview. Moreover, non-disclosure agreements might actually prevent them from doing so. In 2006, a survey by the IGDA found that 35% of the respondents either "don't ever" or "only sometimes" receive official credit. In subsequent years, Mythic, Codemasters, and Rockstar Games all self-confirmed that they at some point had a policy of only crediting employees who stayed until the end of development. This has been denounced as a way of trapping workers in the company, and punishing them if they leave. Rockstar, which was particularly criticized over this, eventually abolished the policy. In 2021, The Washington Post stated that the issue was still "a huge area of concern". Jan Švelch wrote in a 2021 Games and Culture article that credit omission frequently occurs when work is outsourced, and is particularly common in freemium games.

==== Anti-consumer practices ====
Video games as computer software are potentially easy to copy and duplicate outside of the copyright owner's control, which can lead to widespread copyright infringement. Prior to digital distribution, some games included an in-game step that required the player to check part of the game's printed manual or material shipped with the game such as a code wheel, which they entered into the game to validate ownership, though such simple checks were easily defeated through photocopies and shared information. With wide availability of the Internet making such physical schemes impractical to control copyright infringement, many developers and publishers turned to digital rights management (DRM) to control the use of digital content and devices after purchase and to protect an entity's intellectual property from public access. DRM technologies typically tie the specific installation of a game to the computer it is installed on, preventing a user from sharing the same files with a second user; however this also can limit legitimate reuse of the installation of the game by the purchaser on different computers they own. Because of limitations placed on what a user can do with purchases games bundled with DRM, consumers argue it inconveniences legitimate customers and allows big business to stifle innovation and competition. In some types of "always-in DRM", the DRM must have a persistent connection to an external server, which has raised further concerns about the ability for a user to play a game if they temporarily lack an Internet connection, and the fate of the game if the DRM server should be discontinued.

With the advent of digital distribution and online storefronts for video games, publishers and developers sought ways to further monetize the game as to obtain further revenue after the initial sale. Larger expansion packs led way to the nature of microtransactions, small purchases, typically under US$5 for a small benefit in the game. One of the first examples of this was a piece of horse armor for The Elder Scrolls IV: Oblivion, which proved controversial. Publishers and developers would continue to develop other monetization methods, such as freemium games that are free to play but the player benefits by spending real-life money for in-game boosts. A more recent approach is the idea of loot boxes, popularized in games like Overwatch, where the player can purchase with either in-game or real-life funds a virtual box that contains a set of in-game items, with the items being distributed by various rarity levels. Loot boxes came under intense government and media scrutiny in 2018 as it felt these mechanics were too close or were like gambling, and would violate their local laws. Some countries like Denmark and the Netherlands banned the use of loot boxes, while other countries like the United States and United Kingdom urged the video game industry to voluntarily regulate the use of loot boxes.

==== Environmental concerns ====
The video game industry does contribute towards environmental concerns with how large it has grown in the 2010s. Both the sourcing of electronics hardware to make consoles and personal computers, and the generation of electricity for playing games are considered part of the industry's environmental footprint. Newer game technology such as cloud gaming utilize data centers which is also generally less energy efficient compared to traditional computing, though provide performance benefits. In the United States, as of 2019, it was estimated that the total power used by video games was about 34 TWh/year or 2.4% of the total domestic energy market, and associated 24 MT/year of carbon dioxide emissions, equivalent to that of 5 million gas-engine automobiles. Major console manufactures Sony and Microsoft have both committed to improving their console hardware to be more sustainable and reducing power requirements.

== See also ==
- Folk devil
- Think of the children
- Game brain
- Greek electronic game ban
- List of banned video games
- List of controversial video games
- Media influence
- Research on the effects of violence in mass media
- Nanny state
- Videogame Rating Council
- Effects of video games on behavior

Examples

- Islamic Fun
- Super Columbine Massacre RPG!
- Tropes vs. Women in Video Games
- V-Tech Rampage
- Postal
