= Effects of video games on behavior =

The effects of video games on behavior are complex and, at times, controversial. Video games have been evaluated for use in therapy or education and have been thoroughly studied for potential links to antisocial behavior or violence.

== Negative effects ==
=== Violence ===
ESRB Ratings for video games. Used to control who can access overly violent and sexual video games.

Video games since their inception have been the subject of concern due to the depictions of violence they may contain, which have heightened as the technology behind video games improves the amount of visual detail and realism of games. Video games are often seen as a possible cause to violent actions, notably in the aftermath of the 1999 Columbine High School massacre, but academic studies have yet to identify solid evidences linking violence in video games and violent behavior. The American Psychological Association stated, in 2015, that a correlation between the use of violent video games and aggressive behavior was observed. However, it was noted, "the interpretations of these effects have varied dramatically, contributing to the public debate about the effects of violent video games." In 2017, Division 46 (Society for Media Psychology and Technology) of the American Psychological Association stated that "Scant evidence has emerged that makes any causal or correlational connection between playing violent video games and actually committing violent activities." Despite the lack of solid evidence and academic consensus, politicians and activists have sought for ways to restrict the sale of violent video games, particularly to minors, on the basis that they can lead to violent behavior. Within the United States, the issues of video game sales regulation led to both the formation of the Entertainment Software Rating Board in 1994, and the 2011 Supreme Court of the United States landmark case Brown v. Entertainment Merchants Association that ruled that video games are a protected class of free speech and blocking legislation on such sales restrictions. According to The Pew Research Center, in 2008, a study found that 97% of kids from the ages 12–17 engaged with video games, and two-thirds of the kids in the study played some sort of action or adventure game which tended to contain violent content. Another analysis discovered that more than 50% of all games rated by ESRB included violence, which encompasses more than 90% of the games rated as suitable for kids 10 years or older.

=== Gaming addiction, gaming disorder, and other health-related concerns ===
Video game addiction is the excessive or compulsive use of computer and video games that negatively interferes with daily life. Instances have been reported in which users play compulsively, isolating themselves from family and friends or from other forms of social contact, and focus almost entirely on in-game achievements rather than broader life events. The first video game to attract political controversy for its "addictive properties" was the 1978 arcade game Space Invaders. One study from Chung Ang University observed that other structures affected by the excessive use of video games include the anterior cingulate cortex and orbitofrontal cortex. The results from this experiment suggest an increase in stimulation of these areas, resembling a pattern similar to those with substance dependence. Researchers interpreted their results of this increase in activity of the anterior cingulate and orbitofrontal cortices to be an indication of an early stage of video game addiction.

The World Health Organization has included "gaming disorder" in the 11th edition of the International Statistical Classification of Diseases and Related Health Problems, which was approved by May 2019. It was defined as "a pattern of persistent or recurrent gaming behaviour ('digital gaming' or 'video-gaming')", defined by three criteria: the lack of control of playing video games, priority given to video games over other interests, and inability to stop playing video games even after being affected by negative consequences. The addition was contested by the video game industry and several academics, believing that its inclusion was too early and that more studies were needed.

Outside of mental health, medical researchers are concerned with the issues that can be caused by the lengthened immobilization, poor posture, and the over exertion of the visual system that happens when excessively playing video games. These can lead to multiple health concerns such as musculoskeletal issues, vision impairment, and obesity.

=== Gaming culture and online harassment ===
A further issue that can occur through gaming is online harassment or bullying behaviors. Esports communities seem to be particularly suffering from toxic behaviors. Especially in competitive esports games, negative behavior, such as harassment, can create barriers to players achieving high performance and can reduce players' enjoyment which may cause them to leave the game. With its largely young, male-dominated population, gamers may exhibit habits and behaviors sometimes seen by outside groups as toxic and misogynistic, leading to harassment of other players. A specific example of harassing behavior occurring within a game can be found in Xbox Live services. With its online chat and party system, this leaves the service open to unwanted harassment, trolling, or bullying to occur between players. To address these concerns, Microsoft made improvements with reputation levels for a player's Xbox Live account. The system is set to warn, then punish bad behavior in hopes of better regulating Xbox Live accounts.

The anonymous nature of the internet may be a factor of encouraging anti-social behavior. This type of behavior expands to other parts of the internet separate from gaming, such as online forums, social media sites, etc. Lack of accountability for one's actions on the internet may encourage others to engage in harassing behavior. Without minimal threat of punishment, some may find it easier to carry out negative behavior over online gaming. The Gamergate controversy that started in 2014 drew media attention to the negative portions of the culture of the video game community, highlighting the need to take steps against online harassment.

Regarding whether attitudes towards women in games and gaming culture extend as far as misogyny, opinions have been divided. For example, VentureBeat writer Rus McLaughlin sees it as a status quo "ingrained in video-game DNA", while Joe Yang (writing for the same source) regards such claims to be misleading, and sees misogyny as a problem where it does occur, but disputes that it is inherent or normative, or that the whole culture should be described that way. In the gaming industry, 48 percent of female gamers report receiving harassment based on their gender. A survey conducted in the United States, Germany and China found that 59 per cent of women hide their gender to avoid harassment.

A further issue related to online behavior is the presence of younger players who may be exposed to behaviors of more mature players beyond the ability for parents to control this exposure, coupled with issues such as harassment and bullying. In the past, this has typically been controlled through the closed online environments from each of the major console systems that could maintain a safe environment, but with the wider availability of cross-platform play to allow console players on one system to play with those on other systems or with players on personal computers, these environments are no longer as controlled. In December 2020, the three major console manufacturers Microsoft, Sony, and Nintendo announced a joint plan to promote safer gaming based on the three principles of prevention, partnership, and responsibility to combat harassing and troubling behavior.

== Positive effects ==
How can video games boost your mental health?

Some researchers claim that video games, more than causing no harm, are beneficial to social and cognitive development and psychological well-being. Certain scholars admit that games can be addictive, and part of their research explores how games connect to the reward circuits of the human brain. But they recognize the cognitive benefits of playing video games: pattern recognition, system thinking, and patience.

=== Cognitive skills ===
Action video game players have better hand–eye coordination and visuo-motor skills, such as resistance to distraction, sensitivity to information in the peripheral vision and ability to count briefly presented objects, than non-players. Through the development of the PlayStation Move, Kinect and Wii, video games can help develop motor skills through full body movement. Furthermore, video games have been linked with increased visual and attentional skills. Studies have shown that video game players were not only able to track two more objects on average than non video-game players, but were also more likely to recognize targets in a cluttered area. Experiments have indicated increases in cognition and problem solving skills in professional gamers. A common viewpoint is that playing video games is an intellectually lazy activity, but research suggests it may actually strengthen children's spatial navigation, reasoning, memory and perception skills.

In a 1994 study conducted by the University of California in which fifth graders played multiple consecutive hours of video games, the players were seen to obtain improved spatial skills. The children were split into two groups, with the experimental group playing Marble Madness, while the control group played Conjecture. The distinction is important because Marble Madness requires spatial skills while Conjecture does not. The results may not be generalizable, since the sample of kids is taken from a single private school, and may not necessarily be representative of the population. The children practiced their respective game for forty-five minutes per session for three sessions, all on separate days. Appropriate pre- and post-tests were also assessed for spatial ability, on the day before and after the sessions. Irrespective of gender, practicing Marble Madness significantly increased spatial ability, especially in the children who had low performance on the spatial ability pre-test. Conversely, playing Conjecture did not increase children's spatial skills. This indicates that the type of game is important to consider when changes to cognitive abilities appear to be present. It is unknown if these increases in spatial ability persist into the long-term. This could mean that any benefits to practicing may only last if practice sessions are done at least intermittently.

=== Relief from stress ===
Olsen suggests video games can have social benefits for children; for example, video games can provide a topic of discussion and something over which children can bond, and can help children make friends. Playing video games can increase a child's self-esteem when they are struggling in one aspect of their life, but are able to advance in a video game, and children can also learn to take on leadership roles within a multi-player online game. Christopher Ferguson, a psychologist well known for his video game research, conducted a study in which results suggest that violent games reduce depression and hostile feelings in players through mood management.

According to a research paper done by Radboud University, creating positive emotions help to build motivation, relationships, and cope with failure. It also helps to monitor negative emotions such as anger, frustration or anxiety and control these emotions in order to achieve a goal (Isabela Granic, Adam Lobel, and Rutger C.M.E. Engels). By learning to motivate themselves, students could push themselves to achieve goals and improve their performance academically as they would improve their performance similarly in their video games. Also, social games that rely on interactions with other people would promote healthy relationships and better communication between their fellow students, teachers and others outside of school. This could also benefit the students to work harder in class to achieve better grades and learn from their mistakes and improve rather than become frustrated. As video games are a favored pastime among many students, having a game that promotes positive emotions will help to alleviate stress in the classroom, making the environment fun and sociable.

A 2020 Oxford Internet Institute study involving over 3000 adult players involving the games Animal Crossing: New Horizons and Plants vs Zombies: Battle for Neighborville during the COVID-19 pandemic found that those that played games longer felt happier and were less stressed. The researches concluded that these effects were partially contributed by a combination of the competence and social interaction brought through the games, and suggested that longer play times could improve a player's well-being. However, the researchers also identified other factors that could influence this benefit, including the player's experiences outside of the game which may actually lead to a negative impact on well-being with longer playtimes.

=== Physical rehabilitation ===
Studies have also tried using video games to assist in physical rehabilitation. Researchers used video games to provide physical therapy, improved disease self-management, distraction from discomfort, and increased physical activity, among other things. All of the above studies showed a significant improvement among testers. In addition, research done in Taiwan has shown that video game therapy can be used to improve the physical health of children with developmental delays.

=== Education ===
Other studies have examined the benefits of multiplayer video games in a family setting; the use of video games in a classroom setting; online gaming; and the effects of video game playing on dexterity, computer literacy, fact recall processes and problem solving skills. Glazer, a researcher, suggests, "A kid in the classroom has to worry about looking like an idiot. In a game, they're raising their hand all the time, and true learning comes from failing." Not all video games are mindless. According to John L. Sherry, assistant professor at Michigan State University, 'educators are increasingly using educational games in the classroom as a motivational tool. The right video games help children master everything from basic grammar to complex math without the drudgery of old-school flash cards.'

Certain studies indicate that video games may have value in terms of academic performance, perhaps because of the skills that are developed in the process. "When you play ... games you're solving puzzles to move to the next level and that involves using some of the general knowledge and skills in maths, reading and science that you've been taught during the day," said Alberto Posso, an associate professor at the Royal Melbourne Institute of Technology, after analysing data from the results of standardized testing completed by over 12,000 high school students across Australia. As summarized by The Guardian, the study [published in the International Journal of Communication], "found that students who played online games almost every day scored 15 points above average in maths and reading tests and 17 points above average in science". However, the reporter also stated that "[the] methodology cannot prove that playing video games were the cause of the improvement". The Guardian also reported that a Columbia University study indicated that extensive video gaming by students in the 6 to 11 age group provided a greatly increased chance of high intellectual functioning and overall school competence.

In a study done in 2017 by the International Conference Educational Technologies they explored the educational purposes of the video game Minecraft. The results that they concluded from this experiment was that it increased collaboration between groups, increased problem solving skills, improved computer skills and more.

In another study published in 2019 within Computers in Human Behavior, which used the Next Steps longitudinal dataset, researchers found that teenage girls who played video games for more than nine hours per week were three times more likely to go on to do a physical STEM degree than those who did not play video games. The researchers suggested that video games may be a way to plug the STEM gap by encouraging girls who play video games to explore STEM pathways.

In an interview with CNN, Edward Castronova, a professor of Telecommunications at Indiana University Bloomington said he was not surprised by the outcome of the Australian study but also discussed the issue of causal connection. "Though there is a link between gaming and higher math and science scores, it doesn't mean playing games caused the higher scores. It could just be that kids who are sharp are looking for a challenge, and they don't find it on social media, and maybe they do find it on board games and video games," he explained.

=== Business skills ===
In 1997, Herz and in 2006, Wade and Beck, authors, suggested video game playing may increase entrepreneurial skills. Herz argued that many so-called negative effects of video games, such as aggression and lack of pro-social behavior, are both necessary and useful traits to have in a capitalistic society. Specifically, Herz argued that many academic researchers have an anti-capitalist bias, and thus failed to notice the benefits of such traits.

=== Pro-social behavior ===
In 2010, Tobias Greitemeyer and Silvia Osswald conducted a series of four experiments where some people played a prosocially themed video game, and others played a neutral video game. They found that the people who played the prosocial game were more helpful compared to the people who played the neutral game when another person had a mishap and asked for help. The people who played prosocial games were also more likely to assist in further experiments as a favor to the researcher, and more likely to step in and calm down a situation where someone was being harassed.

In 2012, a study approved by Iowa State University assessed whether prosocial games could promote helpful behavior in children. In this study, children aged 9–14 years old played three different types of video games. They were first assessed for aggression in order to avoid confounding. Afterwards, they completed a puzzle task with a partner and then assigned tangrams to a fictitious person in another room. The participants were told that the person in the other room, who they did not know was not actually real, had an opportunity to win a prize. The children were told they were not eligible for the gift card. The measure for helpful or hurtful behavior was based on how many easy or difficult tangrams they assigned to the fictitious person. Results indicated that playing prosocial games significantly more helpful behaviors in children than those who played violent video games. Conversely, playing violent video games had significantly more hurtful behaviors in children than the children who played prosocial games. Deviations from the expected pattern were also non-significant. The short-term effects observed after only thirty minutes of playing are substantial enough to consider the possibility that the longer amount of time a child plays a video game, the more effect it will have on their behavior. The researchers concluded that playing prosocial games affects a child's social cognition, because it changes their attitudes and affect. It is also important to note that outside the confines of a study, playing a video game may affect how a child acts, but it is not the only factor present that can affect this.

A study conducted in June 2014 at the University at Buffalo concluded that violent behavior in a virtual environment could lead to players' increased sensitivity of the moral codes that they violated, due to immoral behavior in video games eliciting guilt in players.

== Impact on youth ==
Related to video game content (particularly violence), gaming addiction, and online harassment, there is ongoing concern that video games may have a negative impact on the development of children. Video games are commonly marketed towards younger audiences, and in a 2008 Pew Research Center study, 97% of teenagers from ages 12 to 17 played video games, with games featuring violent content generally among the preferred types of games these minors played. Many of the studies related to linking violence and gambling addiction to video games are performed in consideration of how younger minds can be more susceptible to the possible effects. There has also been studies to try to consider positive effects of video games on youth development, since they encourage cognitive skills and thinking and cooperative participation.

== See also ==
- Video game
- EndeavorRx
- Games and learning
