= Game addiction =

Game addiction or gaming addiction may refer to:

- Problem gambling, repetitive gambling behavior despite harm and negative consequences
- Video game addiction, a behavioral addiction involving problematic, compulsive use of video games that results in significant impairment to an individual's ability to function in various life domains over a prolonged period of time
