= Reactions to the Sandy Hook Elementary School shooting =

Public reactions to the 2012 school shooting

The Sandy Hook Elementary School shooting on December 14, 2012—in which Adam Lanza shot and killed his mother at home, 20 students, 6 teachers, then himself—received domestic and international attention. Public national debate within the United States focused particularly on gun control. Governments and world leaders offered their condolences, while tributes and vigils by people were made in honor of the victims.

== Domestic ==
=== Political ===
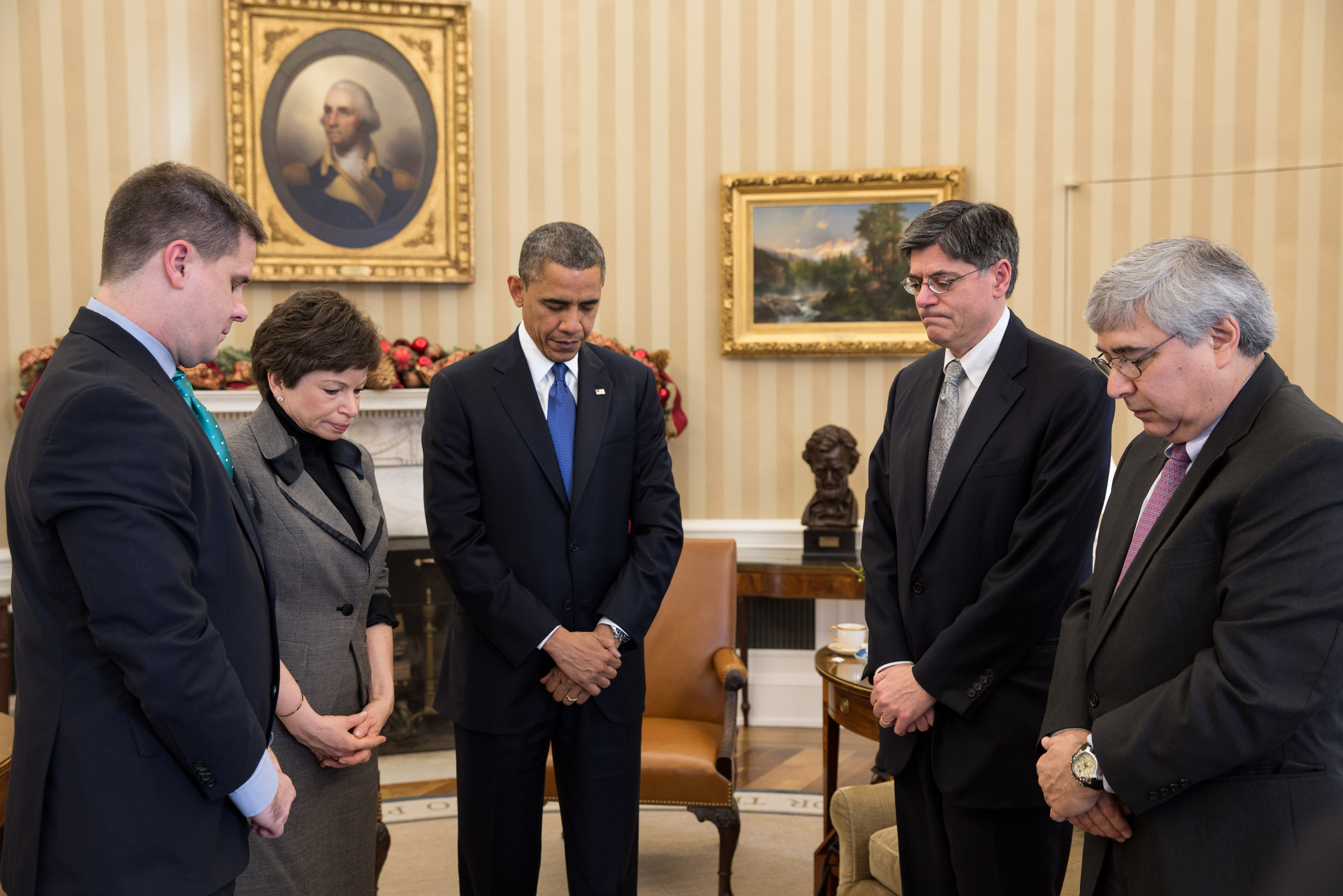
U.S. President Barack Obama and others observe a moment of silence in the Oval Office on December 21, 2012.

President Barack Obama gave a televised address on the day of the shootings, saying, "We're going to have to come together and take meaningful action to prevent more tragedies like this, regardless of the politics." Obama paused twice during the address to compose himself and wipe away tears, and expressed "enormous sympathy for families that are affected". He also ordered flags to be flown at half-staff at the White House and other U.S. federal government facilities worldwide in respect for the victims. Three days after the massacre, 151,000 Americans had signed up at the Obama administration's We the People petitioning website in support of a renewed national debate on gun control. Obama attended and spoke at an interfaith vigil on December 16 in Newtown, Connecticut.

Former Arizona Rep. Gabby Giffords traveled to Newtown and met with the families of the victims of the shooting on January 4, 2013.

=== Leading media and organizations ===
Marion Stokes, a woman from Philadelphia, Pennsylvania and a noted archivist of television programing for 35 years continuously from 1977 until her death on December 14, 2012, finished her archives with news coverage of the Sandy Hook shooting which was occurring as she died. Stokes died at the age of 83. During her lifetime, Stokes was not well known outside the Philadelphia area and her project was not public knowledge outside it either but came to public attention after her death due to the 2019 documentary Recorder: The Marion Stokes Project about Stokes' life and the approximately 71,000 VHS and Betamax tapes that she used to record several different television channels at once (including some of the channels showing breaking news coverage of the Sandy Hook shooting). The director of the documentary, Matt Wolf considers Stokes's tapes an important and objective historical record and Stokes herself was praised by Forbes as a pioneer and visionary for her work.

The day after the shooting, Saturday Night Live paid tribute to the Sandy Hook victims with a performance of "Silent Night", sung by the New York City Children's Chorus, in place of its usual comedic cold open. Two days later The Voice made a similar tribute at the opening of its first night of live finals. Coaches, judges and contestants performed Leonard Cohen's "Hallelujah", surrounded by candles, each holding the name of a victim, while The X Factor paid tribute to the victims by having the finalists of season two perform Michael Jackson's "You Are Not Alone" along with a children's choir as the names of the victims appeared on the screen behind with a message "You Are Not Alone. We Are Here With You" appearing as the song ended.

On December 16, 2012, every NFL team held a moment of silence in honor of the Sandy Hook victims and lowered their flags to half-mast. Many teams put Newtown or "SHES" decals on their helmets. The New England Patriots launched 26 flares into the night sky. The Patriots also took the muskets away from its End Zone Militia—Revolutionary War re-enactors who celebrate every score with gunfire. The team felt the memory of the shooting only 150 miles away was too fresh in people's minds for the sight of firearms and the smell of gunpowder. Victor Cruz of the New York Giants was the favorite football player of one of the child victims, Jack Pinto. After learning that the Pinto family planned to bury Jack in a Victor Cruz jersey, Cruz called the family and wrote "RIP Jack Pinto" and "Jack Pinto my hero" on his shoes during the December 16 game against the Atlanta Falcons. He later travelled to Newtown and visited with the Pinto family. The Sandy Hook Elementary Choir was invited to sing "America the Beautiful" with Jennifer Hudson at the pre-game ceremonies at Super Bowl XLVII on February 3, 2013.

On December 16, 2012, just prior to the start of WWE's TLC: Tables, Ladders & Chairs 2012 event, the audience was prompted to rise as the bell was tolled 26 times in a gesture of respect to the 26 victims of the tragedy, their families, and everyone affected by the events.

On February 2, 2013, 150 children from Sandy Hook Elementary School, their families and teachers were invited by the New York Knicks to attend their game against the Sacramento Kings.

NASCAR Sprint Cup Series driver Michael Waltrip traveled to Newtown to meet with the victims' families and the community. In the 2013 Daytona 500, he drove the #26 car for Swan Racing honoring the 26 victims, with a decal providing a number viewers could text donations to.

The Boston Bruins hockey team scheduled a series of events in the town on February 18, 2013. They presented a street hockey clinic, a clinic with the high school's hockey team and will hold an autograph session with children as well as a meeting with first responders who will be given autographed and framed hockey jerseys.

On Opening Day April 1, 2013 at Yankee Stadium, the New York Yankees and Boston Red Sox honored Newtown, Connecticut. The ceremonies featured a pre-game joint honor guards of police and firefighters from Newtown and a moment of silence as the Sandy Hook victims' names appeared on the video board. Players from both teams wore a ribbon on their uniforms. That same ribbon was to be painted on the field in front of both dugouts. Bud Selig, the Commissioner of Baseball, requested that all the other major league teams also wear the ribbon. The other New York team, the Mets, also paid tribute to the victims by wearing commemorative patches on their uniforms.

=== Entertainment affected ===
The premieres of Parental Guidance and Django Unchained in Los Angeles, scheduled to take place on the 18th, were cancelled following the shooting, with the latter instead being screened privately for cast and crew and their friends and families. Jack Reacher's Pittsburgh premiere was postponed to December 19th.

New episodes of Fox's Family Guy and American Dad!, titled Jesus, Mary and Joseph! and Minstrel Krampus were postponed and replaced with repeats of Grumpy Old Man and Wheels & The Legman and The Case of Grandpa's Key, respectively. Additionally, a repeat of The Cleveland Show season 3 episode, Die Semi-Hard was replaced by a repeat of Menace II Secret Society.

The season 3 episodes of Syfy's Haven that were scheduled to air on December 14 and 21, Reunion and Thanks for the Memories (the season finale), respectively, were postponed, and were replaced with reruns of Eureka and Warehouse 13 episodes, Do You See What I See and The Greatest Gift, respectively. Both episodes were eventually rescheduled and aired on January 17, 2013.

TLC delayed the backdoor pilot episode of Best Funeral Ever, scheduled to air on December 27th, airing on January 6, 2013 instead.

Songs with lyrical references to guns, bullets, and/or premature death were removed from some U.S. radio stations, including "Die Young" by Kesha, "Titanium" by David Guetta, and "Pumped Up Kicks" by Foster The People.

On December 16, 2012, two days after the shooting, Showtime opted to show a disclaimer prior to the season finales of both Homeland (season 2) and Dexter (season 7).

=== Gun control ===
The Sandy Hook Elementary School shooting prompted renewed debate about gun control in the United States, including proposals for making the background-check system universal, and for new federal and state legislation banning the sale and manufacture of certain types of semi-automatic firearms and magazines with more than ten rounds of ammunition.

Within hours of the shooting, a We the People petition was started asking the White House to "immediately address the issue of gun control through the introduction of legislation in Congress," and the gun control advocacy group the Brady Campaign to Prevent Gun Violence reported that an avalanche of donations in the hours after the shooting caused its website to crash. Five days later, President Obama announced that he would make gun control a "central issue" of his second term, and he created a gun violence task force, to be headed by Vice President Joe Biden. On January 16, 2013, Obama signed 23 executive orders and proposed 12 congressional actions regarding gun control. His proposals included universal background checks on firearms purchases, an assault weapons ban, and limiting magazine capacity to 10 cartridges.

On December 21, 2012, the National Rifle Association of America's Wayne LaPierre said gun-free school zones attract killers and that another gun ban would not protect Americans. He called on Congress to appropriate funds to hire armed police officers for every American school and announced that the NRA would create the National School Shield Emergency Response Program to help. After LaPierre's press conference, the Brady Campaign asked for donations to support its gun control advocacy and asked NRA members "who believe like we do, that we are better than this" to join its campaign. On January 8, 2013, former Congresswoman Gabby Giffords, who was shot and injured in a shooting in Tucson exactly two years prior, launched Americans for Responsible Solutions (later merged into Giffords Law Center to Prevent Gun Violence) to raise money for gun control efforts to counter the influence of gun rights groups such as the NRA.

On January 16, 2013, New York became the first U.S. state to act after the shooting when it enacted the Secure Ammunition and Firearms Enforcement (SAFE) Act. On April 4, 2013, Connecticut and Maryland both enacted new restrictions to their existing gun laws. Ten other states had passed laws that relaxed gun restrictions.

Legislation introduced in the first session of 113th Congress included the Assault Weapons Ban of 2013 (AWB 2013) and the Manchin-Toomey Amendment to expand background checks on gun purchases. Both were defeated in the Senate on April 17, 2013.

=== Violent video games ===
During the investigation into Adam Lanza's background, officials claimed that Lanza had possessed "thousands of dollars' worth of violent video games". Though the link between Lanza's video game habits and the shooting was not yet clear from the investigators, the findings reopened debate on the hypothesized connection between violent video games and real-world crime.

Senator Jay Rockefeller called for regulation of the video game industry shortly after the shootings. In mid-January 2013, representatives from the video game industry met with Vice President Biden on the subject of violent video games and their regulation. In late January, Representative Jim Matheson reintroduced legislation that he had been attempting to pass that would require stores to post notices about video game ratings and restrict sales of mature and adult games to children.

The Entertainment Software Association published a statement offering its condolences to the families and stating "The search for meaningful solutions must consider the broad range of actual factors that may have contributed to this tragedy. Any such study needs to include the years of extensive research that has shown no connection between entertainment and real-life violence." The ESA retained professional lobbyist firm Brown Rudnick Government Relations Strategies, run by former Connecticut House Speaker Thomas D. Ritter to represent their interests with the state legislature.

=== Investors ===
Private equity fund Cerberus Capital Management, the owner of firearms manufacturer Remington Outdoor Company, the manufacturer of the Bushmaster brand AR-15 style rifle used in the shooting, announced its intention to sell Remington. In 2015, unable to find a buyer for Remington, Cerberus notified investors it would permit them to cash out. In 2018, Cerberus turned over Remington to bankruptcy court in Delaware.

Days after the shooting, California State Treasurer Bill Lockyer ordering an accounting of investments in gun manufacturers from California's teacher pension system California State Teachers' Retirement System (CalSTRS) and public employee pension system California Public Employees' Retirement System (CalPERS). On January 9, 2013, the Teachers' Retirement Board Investment Committee directed staff to "begin the process of divestment from firearm companies that manufacture weapons that are illegal in California." In 2013, CalSTRS divested from Sturm Ruger and the American Outdoor Brands Corporation (formerly Smith & Wesson). CalSTRS divested from Remington; completion of the divestment from Remington was delayed until 2015 due to contractual obligations regarding CalSTRS's investment in a private equity pool managed by Cerberus.

=== Lanza's family ===
Shortly after the shooting, news stations received false reports that Ryan Lanza, Adam's older brother, was the perpetrator. Ryan found out about this while sitting at his desk at work. It was reported that his office in Times Square, New York was raided by police shortly after he found out about the false accusations. Ryan's Facebook was flooded with messages and comments shortly after news networks posted pictures of him. He made two posts on his Facebook account criticizing the media and harassers within three minutes of each other, likely before police raided his office.

The day following the shooting, Peter Lanza, Adam's father, released a statement:

Our hearts go out to the families and friends who lost loved ones and to all those who were injured. Our family is grieving along with all those who have been affected by this enormous tragedy. No words can truly express how heartbroken we are. We are in a state of disbelief and trying to find whatever answers we can. We too are asking why. We have cooperated fully with law enforcement and will continue to do so. Like so many of you, we are saddened, but struggling to make sense of what has transpired.

== International ==
=== States and world leaders ===
- Australia – Prime Minister Julia Gillard issued a press release, stating that the Australian people "share America's shock at this senseless and incomprehensible act of evil. As parents and grandparents, as brothers and sisters, as friends of the American people, we mourn the loss of children, aged only five to ten years, whose futures lay before them. We mourn the loss of brave teachers who sought only to lead their students into that future but were brutally murdered in a place of refuge and learning".
- Azerbaijan – President Ilham Aliyev sent a letter of condolence to Barack Obama, saying: "I was deeply astonished and grieved to hear about the terrible tragedy that happened at the school in Newtown, Connecticut. Sharing in your grief on behalf of the people of Azerbaijan and on my own, I would like to express my sincere condolences to you, families and friends of those killed and all the American people".
- Canada – Prime Minister Stephen Harper wrote on Twitter: "The news is just awful. The thoughts and prayers of Canadians are with the students and families in Connecticut affected by this senseless violence."
- China – Chinese netizens gave many condolences for Americans affected by the shootings in Newtown. On the same day as Sandy Hook there was a knife attack at an elementary school in China in which 23 children were left wounded. A number of commentators have drawn comparisons between the two incidents.
- Commonwealth of Nations – Queen Elizabeth II said in a message to President Obama, "I have been deeply shocked and saddened to learn of the dreadful loss of life today in Newtown, Connecticut; particularly the news that so many of the dead are children." She added that Prince Philip joined her in extending their heartfelt sympathy to Obama and the American people.
- European Union – Foreign Policy Chief Catherine Ashton said in a statement "I want to express my shock after the tragic shooting at a school in Connecticut today," She also said, "I think of the victims, their families and the American people at this difficult time," European Commission Chief José Manuel Barroso said, "It is with deep shock and horror that I learned of the tragic shooting in Connecticut," European Commission Chief José Manuel Barroso said. "On behalf of the European Commission and myself, I express my sincere condolences to the families of the victims of this terrible tragedy,"
- France – President François Hollande commented that he was "horrified" upon hearing about the event.
- Hungary – The Ministry of Foreign Affairs expressed its "deep dismay" at the tragedy and extended its sympathy to the bereaved.
- Iran – Foreign Ministry spokesman Ramin Mehmanparast condemned "the massacre of American children" and expressed his condolences to the families of victims. An Iranian state-run newspaper claimed that Israeli "Mossad death squads" were the actual perpetrators of the shooting and that Lanza was merely a patsy. President Mahmoud Ahmadinejad himself expressed his sympathy to the United States.
- Israel – Prime Minister Benjamin Netanyahu wrote a letter to Obama on the day of the tragedy. 'We in Israel have experienced such cruel acts of slaughter and we know the shock and agony that they bring. I want to express my profound grief, and that of all the people of Israel, to the families that lost their loved ones. I hope that you and the American people will find the strength to overcome this unspeakable tragedy."
- Japan – Prime Minister Yoshihiko Noda sent a condolence message to President Obama saying, "We express our condolences to the families of the victims... the sympathy of the Japanese people is with the American people."
- Lithuania – President Dalia Grybauskaitė stated that she was deeply distressed by the Connecticut tragedy. Grybauskaitė wished "great strength" to the families of those who had perished.
- Malaysia – Prime Minister Najib Razak extended his deepest condolences to the families of victims. "It's a tragic incident and Malaysia stands by your side," stated the Prime Minister via Twitter.
- Mexico – President Enrique Peña Nieto expressed his condolences via Twitter, saying, "My solidarity is with the American people and President Obama".
- Monaco – Prince Albert II expressed sadness over the "unspeakable tragedy."
- Norway – Prime Minister Jens Stoltenberg wrote on Facebook: "My thoughts are with the families who have lost their loved ones in the horrible shooting in Connecticut." King Harald also sent a personal condolence letter to President Obama.
- Philippines – President Benigno Aquino III stated that he and the Filipino people stand with the United States "with bowed heads, yet in deep admiration over the manner in which the American people have reached out to comfort the afflicted, and to search for answers that will give meaning and hope to this grim event." "We pray for healing, and that this heartbreak will never be visited on any community ever again," he added, in a statement tweeted by deputy presidential spokesman Abigail Valte.
- Portugal – In a statement addressed to Barack Obama, President Aníbal Cavaco Silva sent his condolences and added "On behalf of the People of Portugal and in my own personal name, I address Your Excellency my deepest and heartfelt feelings, which I beg you to impart to the victims' families."
- Russia – President Vladimir Putin sent a telegram to Barack Obama expressing Russia's heartfelt condolences and "grief" at the fact that the victims were mostly children. He asked Barack Obama to convey words of compassion and sympathy to the victims' relatives, saying he empathized with the entire American nation.
- Singapore – Prime Minister Lee Hsien Loong wrote a message to Obama saying that he was "deeply shocked and saddened" to hear of the shooting. "An event like this reminds us of our common humanity, regardless of nationality or where we live in the world." "This was a senseless loss of innocent young lives, especially since schools should be sanctuaries for our children. I wish you success in your efforts to prevent such tragedies from recurring in the future." He also expressed condolences on Facebook. Similarly, Foreign Affairs and Law Minister K. Shanmugam expressed his condolences in a Facebook post saying that "Children are innocent, full of life and promise. Cut down in a hail of bullets by a person with a rifle. There have been so many shootings in the U.S. over the years we no longer get surprised that this happens", he went on to say that in no other developed country do school shootings happen so regularly.
- Spain – The Ministry of Foreign Affairs and Cooperation announced that Spain expressed its "deepest condolences" and that "in these sad moments, Spain shares the pain of the families of the victims and their friends, the people of the United States.
- Turkey – Prime Minister Recep Tayyip Erdoğan sent a message to Barack Obama saying "Mr. President, I am very sorry to hear about the shootings. We deeply share your sadness. In the name of Turkish people, our government and myself we hope well beings for the wounded."
- United Kingdom – Prime Minister David Cameron wrote on Twitter: "My thoughts are with those who've been devastated by the Connecticut shootings."
- United Nations – In a letter to Connecticut governor Dan Malloy, UN Secretary-General Ban Ki-moon voiced his "deepest condolences at the shocking murders," referring to the rampage. He noted that the targeting of children in the murder was "heinous and unthinkable".
- Vatican City – Secretary of State Tarcisio Bertone issued a letter of condolence on behalf of Pope Benedict XVI, which was read aloud at a Newtown vigil, saying, "In the aftermath of this senseless tragedy, [the Holy Father] asks God, our Father, to console all those who mourn and to sustain the entire community with the spiritual strength which triumphs over violence by the power of forgiveness, hope and reconciling love."

=== Leading media and organizations ===
There were tributes and vigils in Bengaluru, Karachi and in Monrovia, Liberia. An organized candlelight vigil was held in India and a makeshift memorial set up at the U.S. embassy in Moscow. Media in the United Kingdom compared the shooting to the Dunblane school massacre, another school shooting that occurred in 1996, in which 16 children and one teacher were killed before the shooter, 43-year-old Thomas Hamilton, committed suicide. In the Marshall Islands, students of Majuro Cooperative school dressed in the green and white colors of Sandy Hook Elementary and presented a condolence card to the American ambassador.

=== Political ===
In the Canadian province of Ontario, then-Premier Dalton McGuinty announced a "locked door" policy, as part of a Safe Welcome Program at all elementary schools as of September 2013. About 2,450 elementary schools applied for and received funding from the province to install front-door buzzers and security cameras. Together with the 850 schools that installed them with provincial funding in 2005, the new equipment means about 80 per cent of Ontario's 4,000 elementary schools will have secured front doors. In the Greater Toronto Area, 1,287 schools received funding through their 12 school boards such as the Toronto Catholic District School Board, Toronto District School Board, Durham Catholic District School Board, and York Region District School Board.

Every Ontario school board is required to have a local police-school board protocol, which includes a lockdown plan that is practised at least twice each year. Professional development and training has been made available to school and board staff, along with their local police services, to put the protocol in place at both the elementary and secondary levels.
