= Problem Video Game Playing Questionnaire =

Video game addiction screening scale

- Purpose: measure video game addiction

The Problem Video Game Playing Questionnaire (or PVP Questionnaire) is a scale measured by using a survey containing nine yes-or-no questions. It is designed to measure the disorder commonly referred to as video game addiction. The creators of the scale and accompanying survey are Dr. Ricardo Tejeiro-Salguero, a researcher at the University of Liverpool, and Dr. Rosa María Bersabé-Moran, a Psychology professor at the University of Málaga.

== Scale ==
The scale's survey questions are based on the Diagnostic and Statistical Manual of Mental Disorders (DSM) criteria for substance dependence, and for pathological gambling, as well as the literature on addictions. In presenting their article, published in the British journal Addiction in 2002, Tejeiro-Salguero and Bersabé-Moran showed, through psychometric analysis, that the PVP Questionnaire is one-dimensional, and has acceptable internal consistency (Cronbach's alpha) of 0.69. The pattern of associations between scale scores and alternative measures of problem play (r=0.64 with frequency of play; r=0.52 with mean duration of play; r=0.56 with longest time per session; r=0.47 with score on the Severity of Dependence Scale; all p < 0.001) supports its construct validity.

A study by Hart et al. concluded that, while the PVP is a robust measure of addiction, there is no support for the use of a cutoff score of any level with this instrument.

Further, Tejeiro-Salguero suggested that the pattern of problems associated with high PVP scores can be best referred to as abuse, since it is quite similar to the DSM-IV-TR criteria for substance abuse: a maladaptive pattern (of use) leading to clinically significant impairment or distress as manifested by a failure to fulfill major role obligations at school or home, or continued use despite having persistent or recurrent social or interpersonal problems caused or exacerbated by behavior (arguments, physical fights).

A 2013 review presented in the Clinical Psychology Review journal by a team of professors from Australia, the Netherlands and the UK found that, among 18 instruments analyzed, the PVP was the only one that demonstrated capacity to assess the proposed DSM-V classification of "Internet Use Disorder". Four instruments (including the PVP) demonstrated strong convergent validity, and the scores in the scale were positively related to those of the other six instruments reviewed. Also, the PVP and three other instruments demonstrated a single-factor structure with the factor termed "addiction". The authors concluded that "on the basis of available evidence, this review suggests that the Problem Video Game Playing scale may provide the best overall measure of Internet Use Disorder".

== Research with the PVP ==
The article presenting the PVP questionnaire was also published in 2003 in the Italian journal Personalita/Dipendenze, edited by the Societa di Studio per i Disturbi di Personalitá and in the Greek journal Exartiseis. A short article including the questionnaire's nine items was also published in the American newsletter The Complete Practitioner.

Since 2003, the PVP (in its original version or with minor changes affecting the number of questions or the response format) has been utilized in a variety of studies conducted in several countries:

United States

- Lyles (2007)
- Langley (2010)
- Elliott, Golub, Ream, & Dunlap (2012)
- Ream, Elliott & Dunlap (2011a)
- Ream, Elliott & Dunlap (2011b)
- Tolchinsky & Jefferson (2011)
- Lewis, Weber & Bowman (2006)
- Hart et al. (2009)

Canada

- Adlaf, Paglia-Boak, Beitchman & Wolfe (2008)
- Parker et al. (2008)
- Taylor (2008)
- Lafrenière, Vallerand, Donahue & Lavigne (2009)

Iceland

- Hróarsson (2004)
- Einarsdóttir (2008)
- Skarphédinsson, Pálsdóttir, & Ólason (2008)
- Arnasson (2011)

France

- Bioulac, Arfi & Bouvard (2008)
- Bioulac, Arfi & Bouvard (2010)

Australia

- Loton (2007)
- Porter et al. (2010)

Thailand

- Hongsanguansri, Silpakit & Ruangkanchanasetr (2006)
- Supaket, Munsawaengsub, Nanthamongkolchai, & Apinuntavetch (2008)

Spain

- Tejeiro, Angulo, Gómez-Vallecillo, Pelegrina, Wallace & Emberley (2012)

Brazil

- Icassati-Suzuki, Vieira, Araujo, & Magallaes (2009)

Chile

- Arab et al. (2007)

Peru

- Vallejos & Capa (2010)

United Kingdom

- Collins, Freeman, & Chamarro-Premuzic (2012)

China

- De-Lin Sun et al. (2008)
