= Communication Research (journal) =

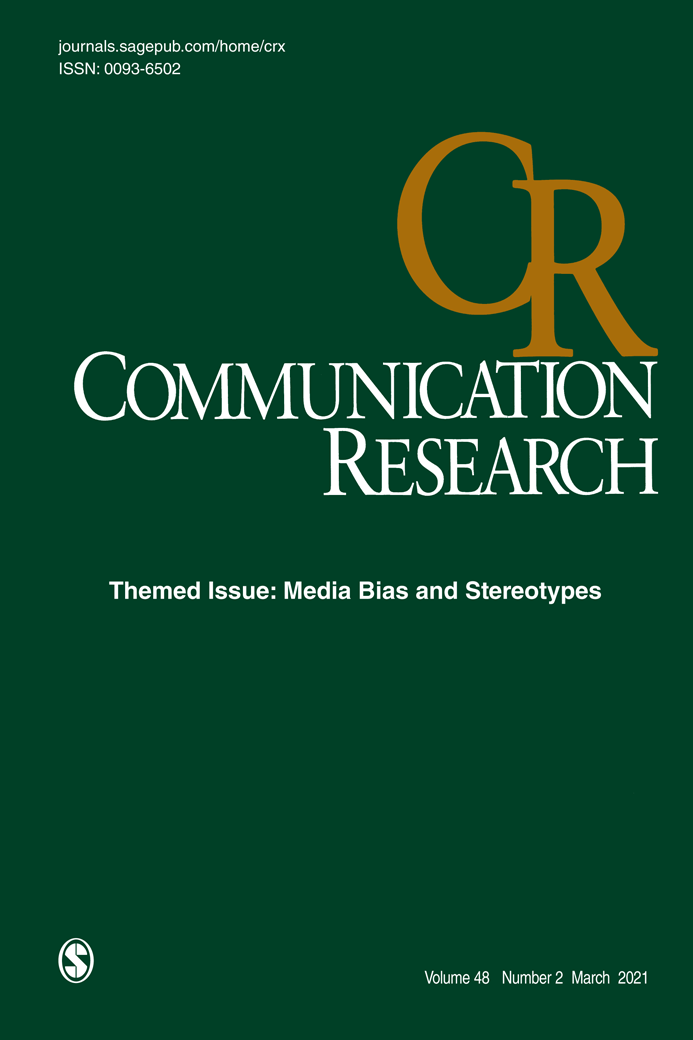
- Discipline: Communication studies
- Language: English
- Edited by: Silvia Knobloch-Westerwick and Jennifer Gibbs

Publication details
- History: 1974–present
- Publisher: SAGE Publishing
- Frequency: Bimonthly
- Impact factor: 3.391 (2017)

Standard abbreviations
- ISO 4: Commun. Res.
- NLM: Communic Res

Indexing
- ISSN: 0093-6502 (print); 1552-3810 (web)
- LCCN: 74642099
- OCLC no.: 818904882

Links
- Journal homepage; Online access; Online archive

Communication Research is a bimonthly peer-reviewed academic journal that covers the field of communication studies and explores the processes, antecedents, and consequences of communication in a broad range of societal systems. The editors-in-chief are Silvia Knobloch-Westerwick (Ohio State University) and Jennifer Gibbs (University of California, Santa Barbara). It was established 1974 and is published by SAGE Publishing.

== Abstracting and indexing ==
The journal is abstracted and indexed in EBSCO databases, ERIC, ProQuest databases, Scopus, and the Social Sciences Citation Index. According to the Journal Citation Reports, its 2017 impact factor is 3.391, ranking it 3rd out of 84 journals in the category "Communication".
