= Brad Bushman =

Chair of Mass Communication Professor at Ohio State University

Brad J. Bushman
- Born: May 14, 1960 (age 65); Salt Lake City, Utah
- Education: Weber State College, University of Missouri
- Known for: Work on aggression and media violence.
- Awards: 2013 Ig Nobel Prize, 2014 Distinguished Lifetime Contribution to Media Psychology and Technology award from the American Psychological Association
- Scientific career
- Fields: Social psychology
- Institutions: Iowa State University, Ohio State University, University of Michigan
- Thesis: The moderating role of individual differences in trait aggressiveness and stimulus sensitivity on responses to provocations and violent media (1989)

Brad J. Bushman (born May 14, 1960, in Salt Lake City, Utah) is the Margaret Hall and Robert Randal Rinehart Chair of Mass Communication Professor at Ohio State University. He also has an appointment in psychology. He has published extensively on the causes and consequences of human aggression. His work has questioned the utility of catharsis, and relates also to violent video game effects on aggression. Along with Roy Baumeister, his work suggests that it is narcissism, not low self-esteem, that causes people to act more aggressively after an insult. Bushman's research has been featured in Newsweek, on the CBS Evening News, on 20/20, and on National Public Radio. He has also been featured on Penn & Teller: Bullshit!. He earned his BS in psychology from Weber State College (now Weber State University) in 1984 and his Ph.D. from the University of Missouri in 1989 and holds three master's degrees (in psychology, statistics, and secondary education). Since 2005, Bushman has spent the summers as a professor of communication science at the Vrije Universiteit Amsterdam, the Netherlands. Prior to joining Ohio State University, Bushman was a professor at University of Michigan and at Iowa State University.

He was awarded an Ig Nobel award in psychology in 2013 for his work about attractiveness of drunk people. In 2014 he received the Distinguished Lifetime Contribution to Media Psychology and Technology award from the American Psychological Association.

In 2016, a paper co-authored by Bushman and his graduate student, Jodi Whitaker, was retracted by Communication Research. The retraction came after Patrick Markey, a Villanova University psychologist, pointed out irregularities in some of the paper's data. Bushman was cleared of wrongdoing by Ohio State, but agreed to the retraction anyway; Whitaker had her Ph.D. revoked.
