= Death of Brandon Crisp =

2008 death of a teenager in Ontario, Canada

Brandon Crisp
- Missing person poster of Crisp
- Born: Brandon Emmett Crisp; 18 January 1993; Canada
- Died: c. October 2008 (aged 15) near Shanty Bay, Ontario, Canada
- Parents: Steve Crisp (father); Angelika Crisp (mother)

Brandon Emmett Crisp (January 18, 1993 – c. October 2008) was a Canadian teenage boy who disappeared on October 13, 2008, when he ran away from his home in Barrie, Ontario, after his parents took away his Xbox 360 video game console due to his excessive playing of Call of Duty 4: Modern Warfare. He was last seen alive on a nearby trail.

His body was found at the base of a tree in an overgrown area on November 5, a few kilometres away, by a party of hunters. An autopsy determined that he likely died of injuries due to a fall from a tree.

== Disappearance ==
On October 13, 2008, Crisp was involved in an argument with his parents over what they described as obsessively playing the video game Call of Duty 4: Modern Warfare on his Xbox 360, after they took the system away. Brandon filled a yellow and grey backpack with clothes and left home riding his bicycle. His parents allowed him to leave and expected "he would be home later that day with his tail between his legs".

According to police, two witnesses claimed to have last seen Crisp on a trail near Shanty Bay, Ontario. They first reported that they had seen Crisp having mechanical trouble with his bicycle on the trail. The second witness reported seeing Crisp later walking along the trail further east, but due to communication mix-ups, this information was not passed along to searchers until the end of October. Crisp's missing person file was flagged nationally by the Canadian Police Information Centre.

Crisp's parents reported him to Barrie Police Service as missing on the morning of October 14. Police began their search on October 18, using heat-sensitive cameras and officers with the K-9 unit. On October 20, police located his mountain bike, which had been abandoned near where he was last witnessed.

Concerned members of the public organized their own search parties, at times consisting of more than 1,600 individuals, some from areas as far away as London, Ontario.

On October 27, Microsoft announced that they would be adding C$25,000 of matching funds to the reward already offered by a local newspaper and the Crisps' Internet service provider, bringing the total reward to $50,000. As the ground searches were progressing, there was also speculation that Crisp had been lured by a fellow Xbox Live player, despite there being no evidence for this; Microsoft offered assistance to the police effort by helping to identify players on Crisp's online friends list.

== Death ==
Police ended the ground search for Crisp on October 30, 2008, but made clear that the investigation was ongoing and continuing around the clock. One week later, on November 5, hunters discovered Crisp's body in an overgrown area near what had been the police search area. An autopsy confirmed the identity of the teen via dental records and determined the cause of death to be "injuries to the chest area that are consistent with a fall from a tree". Barrie Police noted that no foul play was suspected, and that the investigation was ongoing to determine an exact timeline.

== Media coverage and response ==
Within a week of Brandon Crisp's disappearance, the case received significant media coverage throughout Ontario. Toronto-based outlets such as the Toronto Star, Citytv, CP24, and others covered the story, and national outlets such as the National Post, CTV, and CBC soon picked it up as well. A Facebook page started by Brandon's classmates at St. Joseph's Catholic High School in Barrie, titled "Where is Brandon Crisp", grew to almost 22,000 members by the time his body was found.

The news of the discovery of Brandon Crisp's body made national news throughout Canada, with coverage on all major TV networks and national newspapers. The Toronto Sun published it as the front-page headline and picture on November 6, 2008. Thousands of people also flooded the Facebook group and other internet forums with expressions of grief and sympathy for the family.

The story generated internet coverage from bloggers and others trying to help find Crisp, such as the creation of the now-defunct website findbrandoncrisp.com, discussions of the video game related issues, and discussions of how the tragedy emotionally affected the community, police involved, and even strangers.

The report of Crisp's death generated anonymous internet trolling, with many messages and photos posted to the Facebook group that most group members and friends found to be upsetting and disturbing, resulting in the group being shut down, an example of what Mattathias Schwartz of The New York Times has called "Malwebolence".

Brandon Crisp was buried in Barrie on November 14, 2008, in a service attended by more than 1,700 fellow students, friends, family, and community members. National media covered the service, featured as the lead-item on most Ontario newscasts. The Crisp family created the Brandon Crisp Endowment Fund, working with Canadian Tire's JumpStart charity program for assisting families in financial need to participate in minor sports and recreational activities. By October 2009, over $140,000 had been raised.

Crisp's story continues to be referenced in discussions about video game addiction and influence, with debate about whether his obsession with Call of Duty actually was a contributing factor to his death, or whether this case was just a tragedy that began with an ordinary teen-parent argument.

On March 6, 2009, the CBC's national news program The Fifth Estate aired an hour-long report on video game addiction and the Brandon Crisp case, titled "Top Gun: When a video gaming obsession turns to addiction and tragedy". The program had sent a team to Barrie to interview Crisp's parents and friends before his body had been found, and those segments were combined with interviews of gaming industry representatives and others. While the program did acknowledge that video gaming was not directly responsible for his death, many journalists and bloggers felt that the program was not balanced and fair, singling out the video game industry and focusing less on the need for parents to educate themselves about video games. Columnist Steve Tilley of the newspaper Toronto Sun called the report "Lazy, cheap and disappointingly one-sided", though he does admit that the report succeeds "in exploring why Brandon Crisp might have become so addicted to Call of Duty 4".

== See also ==
- List of solved missing person cases (post-2000)
