= Blood censorship in China =

Censorship of displaying blood in Chinese media

The Chinese government has censored the display of blood in various industries, particularly in the film, television, video game and anime industries.

== Anime ==
The Chinese government has repeatedly censored anime shows that the country considers immoral, especially those that include bloody and violent scenes. Blood-C, a Japanese anime television series, has been banned since it includes a "particularly bloody" scene which may cause "extreme discomfort". In 2021, China announced they would ban violent, vulgar, and bloody children's TV shows. A statement released by the National Radio and Television Administration said that "the content of broadcasts should be healthy and progressive and should promote truth, good, and beauty in cartoons". In Demon Slayer: Kimetsu no Yaiba, female characters wearing revealing clothing, such as Nezuko Kamado's advanced demon form, have been censored, and the blood in the anime has also been censored.

== Television series ==
The battle part of first episode of the eighth season of Game of Thrones is cut in China.

== Video games ==
The display of blood in Chinese game industry is strictly limited, if not banned. Before 2019, blood in many games cannot be red. The new ban prohibits the presence of any blood. Peacekeeper Elite, a battle royale game developed in China, has no blood or death. When players get eliminated, they wave goodbye to the player who eliminated them. The version of Diablo IV set for release in mainland China in 2025 has removed depictions of blood and skeletons.
