= Video game addiction =

Addiction to playing video games

- Other names: Gamer disorder, internet gaming disorder, problematic online gaming
- Symptoms: Playing video games for extremely long periods, social withdrawal
- Complications: Mood disorders, depression, somatisation, sleep disturbances, obesity, anxiety disorders
- Risk factors: Preexisting mental disorder (ADHD, OCD, conduct disorder, major depressive disorder)
- Frequency: 3.3%

Video game addiction (VGA), also known as gaming disorder or internet gaming disorder, is generally defined as a behavioural addiction involving problematic, compulsive use of video games that results in significant impairment to an individual's ability to function in various life domains over a prolonged period of time. This and associated concepts have been the subject of considerable research, debate, and discussion among experts in several disciplines and has generated controversy within the medical, scientific, and gaming communities. Such disorders can be diagnosed when an individual engages in gaming activities at the cost of fulfilling daily responsibilities or pursuing other interests without regard for the negative consequences. As defined by the ICD-11, the main criterion for this disorder is a lack of self-control over gaming.

The World Health Organization (WHO) included gaming disorder in the 11th revision of its International Classification of Diseases (ICD). The American Psychiatric Association, while stating that there is insufficient evidence for the inclusion of internet gaming disorder as an officially recognized disorder in the fifth edition (DSM-5) of the Diagnostic and Statistical Manual of Mental Disorders published in 2013, considered it worthy of further study, thus including it in its chapter on Conditions for Further Study.

Controversy around the diagnosis includes whether the disorder is a separate clinical entity or a manifestation of underlying psychiatric disorders. Research has approached the question from a variety of viewpoints, with no universally standardized or agreed definitions, leading to difficulties in developing evidence-based recommendations.

== Definition and diagnosis ==
Addiction and dependence glossary
- addiction – a neuropsychological disorder characterized by a persistent and intense urge to use a drug or engage in a behavior that produces natural reward; addictive drug – psychoactive substances that with repeated use are associated with significantly higher rates of substance use disorders, due in large part to the drug's effect on brain reward systems; dependence – an adaptive state associated with a withdrawal syndrome upon cessation of repeated exposure to a stimulus (e.g., drug intake); drug sensitization or reverse tolerance – the escalating effect of a drug resulting from repeated administration at a given dose; drug withdrawal – symptoms that occur upon cessation of repeated drug use; physical dependence – dependence that involves persistent physical–somatic withdrawal symptoms (e.g., delirium tremens and nausea); psychological dependence – dependence that is characterized by emotional-motivational withdrawal symptoms (e.g., anhedonia and anxiety) that affect cognitive functioning.; reinforcing stimuli – stimuli that increase the probability of repeating behaviors paired with them; rewarding stimuli – stimuli that the brain interprets as intrinsically positive and desirable or as something to approach; sensitization – an amplified response to a stimulus resulting from repeated exposure to it; substance use disorder – a condition in which the use of substances leads to clinically and functionally significant impairment or distress; drug tolerance – the diminishing effect of a drug resulting from repeated administration at a given dose

=== World Health Organization ===
The World Health Organization (WHO) has included "gaming disorder" in the 11th revision of the International Statistical Classification of Diseases and Related Health Problems (ICD-11), released in June 2018, which was approved by the World Health Assembly in May 2019. The use and enforcement of the ICD-11 officially began on 1 January 2022.

=== American Psychiatric Association ===
While the American Psychiatric Association (APA) does not recognize video game addiction as a disorder, in light of existing evidence, the organisation included video game addiction as a "condition requiring further study" in the DSM-5 as internet gaming disorder. Video game addiction is a broader concept than internet gaming addiction, but most video game addiction is associated with internet gaming. APA suggests, like Khan, the effects (or symptoms) of video game addiction may be similar to those of other proposed psychological addictions. Video game addiction may be an impulse control disorder, similar to compulsive gambling. The APA explains why internet gaming disorder has been proposed as a disorder:

This decision was based upon the large number of studies of this condition and the severity of its consequences. ... Because of the distinguishing features and increased risks of clinically significant problems associated with gaming in particular, the Workgroup recommended the inclusion of only internet gaming disorder in Section 3 of the DSM-5.

Some players become more concerned with their interactions in the game than in their broader lives. Players may play many hours per day, neglect personal hygiene, gain or lose significant weight, disrupt sleep patterns resulting in sleep deprivation, play at work, avoid phone calls from friends, or lie about how much time they spend playing video games.

The APA has developed nine criteria for characterizing the proposed internet gaming disorder:

1. Pre-occupation. Do you spend a lot of time thinking about games even when you are not playing, or planning when you can play next?
2. Withdrawal. Do you feel restless, irritable, moody, angry, anxious or sad when attempting to cut down or stop gaming, or when you are unable to play?
3. Tolerance. Do you feel the need to play for increasing amounts of time, play more exciting games, or use more powerful equipment to get the same amount of excitement you used to get?
4. Reduce/stop. Do you feel that you should play less, but are unable to cut back on the amount of time you spend playing games?
5. Give up other activities. Do you lose interest in or reduce participation in other recreational activities due to gaming?
6. Continue despite problems. Do you continue to play games even though you are aware of negative consequences, such as not getting enough sleep, being late to school/work, spending too much money, having arguments with others, or neglecting important duties?
7. Deceive/cover up. Do you lie to family, friends or others about how much you game, or try to keep your family or friends from knowing how much you game?
8. Escape adverse moods. Do you game to escape from or forget about personal problems, or to relieve uncomfortable feelings such as guilt, anxiety, helplessness or depression?
9. Risk/lose relationships/opportunities. Do you risk or lose significant relationships, or job, educational or career opportunities because of gaming?

One of the most commonly used instruments for the measurement of addiction, the PVP Questionnaire (Problem Video Game Playing Questionnaire, Tejeiro & Moran, 2002), was presented as a quantitative measure, not as a diagnostic tool. According to Griffiths, "all addictions (whether chemical or behavioral) are essentially about constant rewards and reinforcement". He proposes that addiction has six components: salience, mood modification, tolerance, withdrawal, conflict, and relapse. But the APA's nine criteria for diagnosing internet gaming disorder were made by taking point of departure in eight different diagnostic/measuring tools proposed in other studies. Thus, the APA's criteria attempt to condense the scientific work on diagnosing internet gaming disorder.

=== Screening tools ===
The first psychometric test to assess IGD was the Internet Gaming Disorder Test (IGD-20). This test includes 20 questions designed to assess the extent of problems caused by disordered gaming and the degree of symptoms experienced by gamers. The test was first published in a journal article published in the PLoS ONE journal on 14 October 2014.

AICA-S is another screening tool, which is based on the criteria of addiction in DSM-IV and is considered one of few scales that have actually been validated in clinical settings.

The Internet Gaming Disorder Scale–Short-Form (IGDS9-SF) is a short psychometric test to assess video game addiction according to the American Psychiatric Association framework for IGD. Review studies from the late 2020s suggested that the IGDS9-SF presents with robust empirical and clinical evidence and is an effective tool to assess IGD. Moreover, the scale was adapted in several languages as Spanish, Chinese, Czech, German, and many more.

In 2019, the "Gaming Disorder Test", a screening tool for gaming disorder as defined by the World Health Organization, was published. The tool has been validated among participants from Singapore, demonstrating excellent reliability and validity.

== Risk factors ==
The Internet can foster various addictions including addiction to gameplaying.

Addictive playing of MMORPGs is associated with negative effects, whereas normal play is not. Individuals with low self-esteem use MMORPGs to compensate by creating an avatar that is powerful and competent in these online environments, which allows the player to overcome anxieties that may be impaired in the real world. Spending on microtransactions, and more specifically, loot boxes, has been linked to an increased risk of both internet gaming disorder and gambling disorder.

Younger people and men are more likely to experience a gaming disorder than older people and women, respectively. Research from 2014 has shown that the average age of a gamer was 30 years old, and that 32% of players were under 18. Adolescents are at a higher risk of sustaining video game disorder over time than adults.

Comorbid psychiatric disorders act as both risk factors and consequences. Indeed, there is a strong association between video game addiction and anxiety, depression, ADHD, social phobia, and poor psycho-social support. ADHD and its symptoms, such as impulsivity and conduct problems, also increase risks of developing video game disorder. Although internet gaming disorder has a strong relationship with obsessive-compulsive disorder, it is not specific, and internet gaming disorder is both phenomenologically and neurobiologically distinct, which indicates that internet gaming disorder is more characterized by impulsivity than compulsivity. Familial factors appear to play an important role, although this is not well understood.

Some personality traits, such as high neuroticism, high impulsivity, and high aggressiveness, are consistently significant predictors of internet gaming disorder, and combinations of these personality traits seem to play a pivotal role in the acquisition, maintenance and development of the disorder, while other traits, such as agreeableness and being open to new experiences, were found to possibly offer some protection from engaging in problematic gaming behaviors.

== Mechanisms ==
Although there is much research since the 1980s on problematic gaming use, the mechanisms are not well understood, due to inconsistent definitions used in studies.

=== Video game structure ===
Some theories focus on the presumed built-in reward systems of video games, such as compulsion loops, to explain their potentially addictive nature. The anticipation of such rewards can create a neurological reaction that releases dopamine in the body, so that once the reward is obtained, the person will remember it as a pleasurable feeling. This has been found to be similar to the neurological reaction of other behavioral addictions such as substance abuse and gambling disorder.

Mark Griffiths has proposed that another reason online video games are potentially addictive is because they "can be played all day every day." The fact there is no end to the game can feel rewarding for some, and hence players are further engaged in the game.

=== Addiction circuits in the brain ===
Long-term video game playing affects brain regions responsible for reward, impulse control and sensory-motor coordination. Structural analyses have shown modifications in the volume of the ventral striatum, possibly as result of changes in reward systems, and video game addicts had faulty inhibitory control and reward mechanisms. Video game playing is associated with dopamine release similar in magnitude to that of drug abuse and gambling, and the presentation of gaming pictures activates brain regions similarly to drug pictures for drug addicts. Treatment studies which used fMRI to monitor brain connectivity changes found a decrease in the activity of the regions associated with cravings.

There is evidence of a dual processing model of digital technology addictions characterized by an imbalance between the reactive and the reflective reward systems. Other studies have shown increased difficulties in decision making in specific contexts, such as risky situations, and an increased preference for short-term rewards.

A 2015 study has cautioned that although there was evidence that video game addiction may be supported by similar neural mechanisms underlying in drug abuse, as video game and internet addictions reduce the sensitivity of the dopaminergic reward system, it was still premature to conclude that this addiction is equivalent to substance addictions, as the research was in its early stages. A study from 2017 argued that although the number of neuroimaging studies on internet gaming disorder was rising at the time, there were several methodological shortcomings, particularly in the inconsistency of psychometric assessments. Another 2017 study, sharing at least one major contributor, suggested that conclusions on reduced inhibition should be moderated, as only one study at the time had included a functional control, which then showed no difference in inhibition.

A 2011 meta-analytic review of the research available at the time concluded that the evidence suggests that video game addiction arises out of other mental health problems, rather than causing them, and stated that it was therefore unclear whether video game addiction should be considered a unique diagnosis.

== Management ==
As concern over video game addiction grows, the use of psychopharmacology, psychotherapy, twelve-step programs, and use of continuing developing treatment enhancements have been proposed to treat this disorder. Empirical studies indeed indicate that internet gaming disorder is associated with detrimental health-related outcomes. However, the clinical trials of potential treatments remain of low quality, except for cognitive-behavioral therapies, which shows efficacy to reduce gaming disorder and depressive symptoms but not total time spent. Although there is a scientific consensus that cognitive-behavioral therapy is preferable to pharmacological treatment, it remains difficult to make definitive statements about its benefits and efficiency due to methodological inconsistencies and lack of follow-up. Since efficacious treatments have not been well established, prevention of video gaming disorder is crucial. There is some simple and effective coping methods individuals effected by gaming addiction could incorporate into their everyday life, these strategies included; setting a time limit devoted to gaming, keeping technology out of an individual's bedroom to create a healthier environment, and participating in physical activities and exercise. Some evidence suggest that up to 50% of people affected by the internet gaming disorder may recover naturally.

Some countries, such as Singapore, South Korea, China, the Netherlands, Germany, Canada, and the United States, have responded to the perceived threat of video game addiction by opening treatment centres.

=== China ===
China was the first country to treat "internet addiction" clinically in 2008. The Chinese government operates several clinics to treat those who overuse online games, chatting and web surfing. Treatment for the patients, most of whom have been forced to attend by parents or government officials, includes various forms of pain including shock therapy. In August 2009, Deng Sanshan was reportedly beaten to death in a correctional facility for video game and Web addiction. Most of the addiction "boot camps" in China are actually extralegal militaristically managed centres, but have remained popular despite growing controversy over their practices.

In 2019, China set up a curfew, banning minors from playing between certain hours. In 2021, the government of China published a new policy to force corporations to only serve underage teenagers on Friday, Saturday, and Sunday between 8 pm to 9 pm.

=== Germany ===
Germany has many treatment centres for behavioral addictions but only a few that directly treat video game or internet gaming addiction. One of the first outpatient clinics in Germany to offer group therapy for computer game and internet addiction is the Sabine M. Grüsser-Sinopoli Outpatient Clinic for Behavioral Addictions in Mainz.

=== Netherlands ===
In June 2006, the Smith and Jones clinic in Amsterdam—which has now gone bankrupt—became the first treatment facility in Europe to offer a residential treatment program for compulsive gamers. Keith Bakker, founder and former head of the clinic, has stated that 90% of the young people who seek treatment for compulsive computer gaming are not addicted.

=== Canada ===
At a Computer Addiction Services centre in Richmond, British Columbia, excessive gaming accounts for 80% of one youth counselor's caseload.

=== United Kingdom ===
In 2018, the National Health Service announced its plans to open a treatment centre, run by the Central and North West London NHS foundation trust, that will initially focus on gaming disorder, but is planned to expand to cover other internet-based addictions. The specialist treatment centre opened in 2019 for treating adolescents and young people aged 13–25 who are addicted to video games.

=== Singapore ===
Singapore has also provided certain management and rehabilitation for gaming addicts. In 2008, Ministry of Health established National Addictions Management Service (NAMS), located in Institute of Mental Health. Reports about number of cases surged towards the 2020s especially during the COVID-19 pandemic in Singapore, especially on the usage of electronic devices, specifically smartphones. The Ministry of Digital Development and Information has since collaborated with several ministries, schools, Infocomm Media Development Authority, and several community initiatives for management.

== Outcomes ==
=== Physical health ===
The most frequent physical health-related outcome are alterations in physical functioning such as somatization and sleep disturbances. Preliminary evidence suggest that internet gaming disorder and the induced sedentarity may contribute to a lack of physical exercise, even though the relationship is not causal.

=== Noise-induced hearing loss ===
A 2024 systematic review of 14 studies investigating associations between sound-induced hearing loss and playing video games and esports found that there was a significant association between gaming and hearing loss or tinnitus, and that the average measured sound levels during gameplay by subjects (which averaged 3 hours per week) exceeded or nearly exceeded permissible sound exposure levels.

== Epidemiology ==
The prevalence rate of gaming disorder ranges from 0.3% to 17.7%, with the overall prevalence rate being 3.3% (8.5% in males and 3.5% in females), only representative samples reduced it to 2.4%. The prevalence rate varies by region. Asia has the highest prevalence with 6.3%, followed by North America 3.6%, Oceania 3.0%, Europe 2.7%, and multi-region 0.5%. The year 2020′s had the highest prevalence with 5.0%, followed by the 1990′ s 4.0%, 2000′ s 3.6%, 2010–2014 3.3%, and 2015–2019 3.2%. The prevalence dropped, when checking for participants, going from 5.3% by 1000 participants, to 1000–5000 participants 3.6% and studies with more than 5000 participants 2.1%. The highest prevalence was in children and adolescents 6.6%, followed by adolescents and young adults 6.3%, young adults 3.4%, adolescents 3.3%, all adults 1.9%, and adolescents and adults 1.3%. Longitudinal studies 6.0% had the largest prevalence, followed by cross-sectional 3.7% and cohort 0.8% studies, studies using convenience sampling 6.4% were significantly higher than those using nonconvenience sampling 2.8%. The studies that used pathological terminology 5.8% showed the highest prevalence, followed by problematic 4.0%, addiction 3.2%, and disorder 2.6%. The pooled prevalence of studies using the six instrument types was 2.8%. The prevalence using the IGD-9 instrument was 3.7%; similarly, the prevalence for the YDQ tool was 3.6%, followed by the IGDS9-SF 2.8%, GAS-7 2.6%, IGDT-10 2.2%, and AICA-S 1.6%.

== Research ==
=== Debates on the classification ===
A meta-analytic review of pathological gaming studies concluded that about 3% of gamers may experience some symptoms of pathological gaming. The report noted problems in the field with defining and measuring pathological gaming and concluded that pathological gaming behaviors were more likely the product of underlying mental health problems rather than the inverse.

Barnett and Coulson expressed concern that much of the debate on the issue of addiction may be a knee jerk response stimulated by poor understanding of games and game players. Such issues may lead both society and scholars to exaggerate the prevalence and nature of problematic gaming, and over-focus on games specifically, while ignoring underlying mental health issues. However, problem gamblers have a higher chance for getting mental illness as well.

Other scholars have cautioned that comparing the symptoms of problematic gaming with problematic gambling is flawed, and that such comparisons may introduce research artifacts and artificially inflate prevalence estimates. For instance, Richard Wood has observed that behaviors which are problematic in regards to gambling may not be as problematic when put into the context of other behaviors that are rewarding such as gaming. Similarly, Barnett and Coulson have cautioned that discussions of problematic gaming have moved forward prematurely without proper understanding of the symptoms, proper assessment and consequences.

Rather than video gaming disorder being a subtype of gambling disorder, a majority of researchers support the idea of video game addiction being a part of a more comprehensive framework of impulse control disorders with "pathological technology use" with similar characteristics, including the pathological use of video games, internet, computers and other interactive medias. Although internet and video game addictions are generally considered different from gambling disorder and substance abuse, there is a growing body of evidence indicating they share common features, including behavioral and neural features. Indeed, it is suggested that while behavioral addiction may differ with drug addictions in magnitude, they share several characteristics, with Hellman et al. proposing that the concept of addiction should be de-medicalized.

On the contrary, a literature review found that as the video game addiction develops, online gaming addicts spend increasing amounts of time not only playing but also preparing for and organizing their playing sessions, suggesting this addiction may be behavioral rather than a disorder of impulse control. There is recent evidence suggesting that internet gaming disorder can cause two distinct types of dysfunctions: cognitive and metacognitive.

Griffiths has suggested that psycho-social dependence may revolve around the intermittent reinforcements in the game and the need to belong. Hagedorn & Young have suggested that social dependence may arise due to video games occurring online where players interact with others and the relationships "often become more important for gamers than real-life relationships".

=== Controversy and alternative viewpoints ===
Common challenges involve the reliability of the methodology and validity of the results in some studies. Many rely on self-surveys from university students and also lack time frames making it difficult to study the impact, if any, of addiction on a long term scale. Other concerns also address the definition of addiction and how to measure it, questioning whether or not time is a proper unit to determine how addicted someone is to gaming. Daria Joanna Kuss and Mark D. Griffiths have argued the current scientific knowledge on internet gaming addiction is copious in scope and complexity. They state that instead, a simple framework should be provided to allow all current and future studies to be categorized, as internet gaming addiction lies on a continuum beginning with etiology and risk factors all the way through the development of "full-blown" addiction and ending with ramifications and potential treatment. In addition, they caution the deployment of the label "addiction" since it heavily denotes the use of substances or engagement in certain behaviors. Finally, the researcher promotes other researchers to assess the validity and reliability of existing measures instead of developing additional measurement instruments.

Other challenges include the lack of context of the participant's life and the negative portrayal of gaming addicts. Some state that gamers sometimes use video games to either escape from an uncomfortable environment or alleviate their already existing mental issues—both possibly important aspects in determining the psychological impact of gaming. Negative portrayal also deals with the lack of consistency in measuring addictive gaming. This leads to discussions that sometimes exaggerate the issue and create a misconception in some that they, themselves, may be addicted when they are not.

The evidence of video game addiction to create withdrawal symptoms is very limited and thus debated, due to different definitions and low quality trials.

The concept of video game disorder is itself being debated, with the overlap of its symptoms with other mental disorders, the unclear consensus on a definition and thresholds, and the lack of evidence raising doubts on whether or not this qualifies as a mental disorder of its own. Despite the lack of a unified definition, there is an emerging consensus among studies that Internet gaming disorder is mainly defined by three features: 1) withdrawal, 2) loss of control, and 3) conflict. Although the DSM-5 definition of video game disorder has a good fit to current methodological definitions used in trials and studies, there are still debates on the clinical pertinence.

Michael Brody, M.D., head of the TV and Media Committee of the American Academy of Child and Adolescent Psychiatry, stated in a 2007 press release that "there is not enough research on whether or not video games are addictive." However, Brody also cautioned that for some children and adolescents, video games can displace "physical activity and time spent on studies, with friends, and even with family."

A major issue concerns the lack of consistent measures and definitions and of acquisition of follow-up data. Furthermore, the study design quality has not greatly improved between the 2000s and 2017. For instance, most studies measured internet gaming behaviors in terms of frequency of use (total time spent), without considering the type of game (e.g., MMORPG), the social context (e.g., physically or virtually with friends), nor the motivations (e.g., competitive, achievement-oriented "grinding"). Population-level evidence from the COVID-19 period indicates that the amount of time spent gaming, by itself, was not meaningfully associated with mental-health status. Although the amount of time spent was postulated by Johanssonn and Götestam in 2004 to lead to pathological behaviors, it is unclear whether the time spent is a cause or a consequence of pathological use. These criticisms, however, mostly pertain to Western research since there is more data of higher quality available in Asian regions, where the internet gaming disorder is more prevalent.

A survey conducted in 2019 of 214 scholars shown that 60.8% agreed that pathological video game use could be a mental health problems, whereas 30.4% were skeptical. However, only 49.7% agreed with the DSM-5 definition of internet gaming disorder, and 56.5% to the definition of the World Health Organization. Most scholars were worried that WHO's and DSM-5's inclusion of internet gaming disorder was "overpathologizing normal youth" and "precipitated moral panic over video games". This indicates a lack of consensus on the issue as of 2019.

A study published in 2010 reviewed the findings of video game addiction by use of a motorcycle riding computer game with 17 users. 9 of the users were "abstinent ecstasy users" and the other 8 served as the control group. The 2 groups had their dopamine releases monitored throughout the test. After playing, the control group showed reduced dopamine D2 receptor occupancy of 10.5% in the caudate compared to former baseline levels. The abstinent group reported no changes in their dopamine receptors.

A suggested method of research called autoethnography is introduced by Xiao Hu and Hongzhi Zhang that may be a solution to the challenges of current studies on video game addiction. The autoethnographic research is based on the first author's life experience which goes over his reflection on the behavior and the possible solutions that aided in his ability to overcome the addiction. A model that displays motivation/functional needs and prevention/harm reduction factors from a study by Xu et al. proposes ways to reduce the symptoms of video game addiction is included in the article to highlight similar methods the author himself had used. Six major indexes from the study are: attention switching, dissuasion, rationalization/education, parental monitoring, resource restriction, and perceived cost. While this research method is limited, it could still be possible with a group of participants who have already or is currently undergoing the addictive behavior.

In 2022, two studies by Jiaxing Chen, Guangling Zhang, and Qinfang Hu were conducted to test their hypothesis of "the integration of social responsibility with gaming strategies from the psychological perspective of game withdrawal, and the incorporation of social responsibility as an element in gamification design to reduce user withdrawal behaviour, thereby increasing individual's environmentally sustainable behaviour". The results of both studies supported their theory as the participants felt a sense of guilt from their growing gaming addiction and in turn boosted their sense of social responsibility. This proves that the possibility to incorporate gamification strategies and social responsibility within general games can promote pro-environmental and pro-social behavior among users online and reduce the addictive behavior. Companies and the government have already been using gamification in several games for the sustainability of environmental protection with short-term success. Further research will need to be conducted with different participants and other game genres to see if the theory still works.

=== Evolutionary perspectives ===
Some researchers propose that video games tap into motivations shaped by ancestral conditions. From an evolutionary standpoint, play serves multiple adaptive functions—such as honing skills, managing stress, and building social bonds—and video games offer a novel, virtual environment for these activities. By simulating probable ancestral challenges (like cooperation, exploration, and threat-response), games can activate ingrained psychological and emotional systems that reward in-game achievements, even when real-world benefits are minimal.

This "mismatch" between evolved drives and contemporary digital settings may help explain why many people find games so compelling, potentially leading to habitual or compulsive play. Massively Multiplayer Online Role-Playing Games, for instance, feature teamwork and shared goals that resemble hunter-gatherer band structures, reinforcing social ties and group identity. Video games 'simulate' many of the challenges ancestral humans faced, providing a 'hyper-stimulating' recreation of situations humans evolved to find compelling.

== History ==
Video game addiction has been studied since the 1980s, and has seen a significant increase in the number of empirical studies since then.

Walter Bright recalled that "Some people ... disliked Empire" when others at Caltech began playing his creation in the 1970s, "even blaming it for a couple students flunking out because they got addicted to the game and neglected their studies. One even threatened me because of this (incredible, hmm?)". The press has reported concerns over online gaming since at least 1994, when Wired mentioned a college student who was playing a MUD game for 12 hours a day instead of attending class.

Press reports have noted that some Finnish Defence Forces' conscripts were not mature enough to meet the demands of military life and were required to interrupt or postpone military service for a year. One reported source of the lack of needed social skills is overuse of computer games or the internet. Forbes termed this overuse "Web fixations" and stated they were responsible for 13 such interruptions or deferrals over the five years from 2000 to 2005.

In an April 2008 article, The Daily Telegraph reported that surveys of 391 players of Asheron's Call showed that three percent of respondents experienced agitation when they were unable to play, or missed sleep or meals to play. The article reports that University of Bolton lead researcher John Charlton said, "Our research supports the idea that people who are heavily involved in game playing may be nearer to autistic spectrum disorders than people who have no interest in gaming."

On 6 March 2009, the Canadian Broadcasting Corporation's (CBC) national news magazine program the fifth estate aired an hour-long report on video game addiction and the Brandon Crisp story, titled "Top Gun", subtitled "When a video gaming obsession turns to addiction and tragedy."

In August 2010, Wired reported that a man in Hawaii, Craig Smallwood, sued the gaming company NCSoft for negligence and for not specifying that their game, Lineage II, was so addictive. He alleged he would not have begun playing if he was aware he would become addicted. Smallwood says he has played Lineage for 20,000 hours between 2004 and 2009.

In 2013, a man from China observed his son's addiction to video games, and decided to take action. He hired online assassins to kill his son's virtual avatar every time he logged in. He hoped that being relentlessly killed would help his son lose interest in this destructive habit.

A Kiwi gamer named Jacques Strydom spent a staggering $16,000 on Counter-Strike: Global Offensive Loot Boxes. He then went on to regret how the addiction took a massive toll on his personal life.

=== Inclusion in the ICD-11 ===
In the draft versions leading to the final ICD-11 document, gaming disorder was included alongside gambling disorder under "Disorders Due to Addictive Behaviors". The addition defines as "a pattern of persistent or recurrent gaming behaviour ('digital gaming' or 'video-gaming')", defined by three criteria: the lack of control over playing video games, priority given to video games over other interests, and the inability to stop playing video games even after being affected by negative consequences. For gaming disorder to be diagnosed, the behavior pattern must be of sufficient severity to result in significant impairment in personal, family, social, educational, occupational or other important areas of functioning and would normally have been evident for at least 12 months. Research shows gaming disorders can be associated with anxiety, depression, loneliness, obesity, sleeping disorders, attention problems, and stress.

Vladimir Poznyak, the coordinator for the WHO Department of Mental Health and Substance Abuse, defended the addition of gaming disorder, believing the backlash against the addition to be a moral panic as they chose a very narrow definition that encompasses only the most extreme cases of gaming disorder. He said evaluating a disorder for inclusion is nominally done without any external feedback "to avoid interference from commercial and other entities which may have vested interest in the outcome of the process". Dr. Poznyak asserted that several medical professionals consulting on the ICD-11 did believe gaming disorder to be real, and by including it in the ICD-11, there can now be earnest efforts to define its causes and symptoms betters and methods to deal with it, and now include the video game industry within the conversation to help reduce the effects of video games on public health.

The addition of "gaming disorder" to the ICD-11 was criticized by gamers and the video game industry, while some researchers remained skeptical. Some of these researchers said the evidence remains weak and "there is a genuine risk of abuse of diagnoses." A group of 26 scholars wrote an open letter to the WHO, suggesting that the proposed diagnostic categories lacked scientific merit and were likely to do more harm than good. In counter-argument, a group of fifty academic researchers in behavioral science agreed that the evidence to support gaming disorder was weak, but it would be best that WHO identify gaming disorder in ICD-11 so that it could be considered a clinical and public health need.

A report, prepared by mental health experts at Oxford University, Johns Hopkins University, Stockholm University and the University of Sydney, sponsored by The Association for UK Interactive Entertainment argues that while there may be potential addiction associated with video gaming, it is premature to consider it a disorder without further study, given the stigmatisation that surrounds video, and ask the WHO to use caution when finalizing the ICD draft. This report was promoted by 22 video game industry trade organizations including the Entertainment Software Association of the United States and Interactive Software Federation of Europe

As the final approval of the ICD-11 neared, several video game trade associations issued a statement requesting WHO to reconsider the addition of "gaming disorder", stating that, "The evidence for its inclusion remains highly contested and inconclusive". The Entertainment Software Association had meetings with the WHO during December 2018 to try to convince them to hold off including gaming disorder within ICD-11, with more planned meetings to follow.

== Society and culture ==
=== Parental concerns ===
According to ABC News, parents have many concerns about their children playing video games, including concerns about age appropriateness, the amount of time spent playing games, physical health, and aggressive behavior.

=== Governmental concerns ===
The first video game to attract political controversy was the 1978 arcade game Space Invaders. In 1981, a political bill called the Control of Space Invaders (and other Electronic Games) Bill was drafted by British Labour Party MP George Foulkes in an attempt to ban the game for its "addictive properties" and for causing "deviancy". The bill was debated and only narrowly defeated in parliament by 114 votes to 94 votes.

In August 2005, the government of the People's Republic of China, where more than 20 million people play online games, introduced an online gaming restriction limiting playing time to three hours, after which the player would be expelled from whichever game they were playing. In 2006, it relaxed the rule so only citizens under the age of 18 would face the limitation. Reports indicate underage gamers found ways to circumvent the measure. In July 2007, the rule was relaxed yet again. Internet games operating in China must require users identify themselves by resident identity numbers. After three hours, players under 18 are prompted to stop and "do suitable physical exercise". If they continue, their in-game points are "slashed in half". After five hours, all their points are automatically erased.

In 2011, the South Korean government implemented a law, known as the Shutdown law or the Cinderella Law, which prohibits children under the age of 16 from playing online video games between the hours of 12:00 a.m. to 6:00 a.m. Later on, the law was amended and now children under the age of 16 can play after midnight if they have permission from their parents. In 2021, the South Korean government moved to abolish this law.

As of 2017, there were three main types of governmental policies:

- limiting the availability of video games (shutdown, fatigue system, parental controls),
- reducing the risks and harm (warning messages), and
- providing addiction help services to gamers.

Most of these policies were either not as efficient as intended or not yet evaluated for efficiency, which lead some researchers to prompt for a global public health approach to prevent the onset and progression of this disorder. Some researchers suggest that the video game industry should itself place preventive measures against video game addiction.

The government of North Korea has produced propaganda warning against problematic smartphone use and video game addiction.

=== Deaths ===
Gaming addiction also can cause deaths, whether directly or indirectly, to gamers. Causes of deaths are mostly associated through exhaustion from playing games for excessive periods of time leading to heart-related diseases, or affect one's emotions and behavior patterns.

==== India ====
On 4 February 2026, three minor sisters aged 12, 14 and 16 died by suicide after jumping from the balcony of their ninth-floor apartment in a residential high-rise in Ghaziabad, Uttar Pradesh, India.

Police said the deaths followed a dispute at home over the girls' growing dependence on an online, task-based game, and that investigators were examining their mobile phones and speaking with family members to establish the sequence of events.

Authorities said they were reviewing digital evidence and other materials recovered from the apartment as part of the investigation.

==== China ====
In 2005, thirteen-year-old Zhang Xiaoyi committed suicide by jumping from the top of a 24-story tower block in his home province Tianjin. After previously having spent two straight days playing online role-playing games in an Internet cafe, Zhang had told his parents that he had "been poisoned by games and could no longer control himself". His parents sued Aomeisoft, the China-region publisher of the game World of Warcraft. The head of a software association said to gaming website Play.tm that same year "In the hypothetical world created by such games, [players] become confident and gain satisfaction, which they cannot get in the real world."

In 2007, a 26-year-old man identified only as "Zhang" died of a heart attack following a seven-day gaming binge, while a 30-year-old man died in a Guangzhou Internet cafe after playing online games for three straight days.

==== France ====
In February 2025, a 23-year-old man murdered an 11-year-old girl after an online altercation in Fortnite.

==== South Korea ====
In 2005, 28-year old industrial repairman Seungseob Lee (Hangul: 이승섭) visited an Internet cafe in the city of Daegu and played StarCraft almost continuously for fifty hours. He went into cardiac arrest and died at a local hospital. A friend reported: "... he was a game addict. We all knew about it. He couldn't stop himself." About six weeks before his death, he was fired from his job, and his girlfriend, also an avid gamer, broke up with him.

In 2009, Kim Sa-rang, a 3-month-old Korean girl, starved to death after both her parents spent hours each day in an Internet cafe, rearing a virtual child in an online game, Prius Online. The death is covered in the 2014 documentary Love Child.

==== Thailand ====
On 2 August 2008, an 18-year-old high school student murdered a taxi driver in Bangkok to see if carjacking was as "easy in real life as it was in the game," referring to Grand Theft Auto. The teenager also cited the lack of money to afford his gaming habits at internet cafés as another cause for his actions.

==== United States ====
In November 2001, 21-year-old Wisconsinite Shawn Woolley committed suicide; it has been inferred that his death was related to the popular computer game EverQuest. Woolley's mother said the suicide was due to a rejection or betrayal in the game from a character Woolley called "iluvyou".

Ohio teenager Daniel Petric shot his parents, killing his mother, after they took away his copy of Halo 3 in October 2007. In a sentencing hearing after the teen was found guilty of aggravated murder, the judge said, "I firmly believe that Daniel Petric had no idea at the time he hatched this plot that if he killed his parents they would be dead forever", in reference to his disconnection from reality allegedly caused by playing violent video games. On 16 June 2009, Petric was sentenced to 23 years to life in prison.

In 2017, Virginia Beach gamer Brian "Poshybrid" Vigneault, also known by his alias of PoShYbRiD, died during a World of Tanks marathon livestream; Vigneault got up to smoke a cigarette 22 hours into the marathon and never returned. Vigneault had a record of chain-smoking and drinking during each session, which could have factored into his death.

A dispute between two gamers, Casey Viner and Shane Gaskill, over the video game Call of Duty: WWII led to a swatting on an uninvolved person, Andrew Finch in December 2017. After Gaskill gave a false address, Viner then asked an anonymous online swatter to make the fraudulent call. Police responded, resulting in Finch being fatally shot.

== See also ==
- Behavioral modernity
- Digital media use and mental health
- Evolutionary mismatch
- Internet addiction disorder
- Problem gambling
