= Filament Games =

American video game company

- Type: Private
- Industry: Video games
- Founded: 2005; 21 years ago
- Founder: Daniel White; Daniel Norton; Alexander Stone
- Headquarters: Madison, Wisconsin, United States
- Website: Official website

Filament Games is an American educational video game developer based in Madison, Wisconsin and founded in 2005 by partners Daniel White, Daniel Norton, and Alexander Stone. It is a full-service digital studio that develops learning games on a for-hire basis.

== Philosophy ==
Filament's design philosophy based on the scholarship of Kurt Squire, Constance Steinkuehler, and James Paul Gee. Filament is also an affiliate of the annual Games Learning and Society Conference.

== History ==
The company received national recognition for their series of civics games launched by Sandra Day O'Connor for iCivics, her civics-education initiative. These games include Do I Have a Right?, Executive Command, and Liberty Belle's Immigration Nation. Filament has also developed games with partners such as Meta, the Smithsonian Science Education Center, and Columbia University.

== Development History ==
Game title	Release year	Subject Matter	Description	Platform	Partner	Notes
RoboCo	2022	Robotics, Engineering	A STEM and robotics sandbox game about building, controlling, and automating robots.	PC, VR	N/A (first-party)	RoboCo was nominated as a finalist in the 2017 I/ITSEC Serious Games Showcase and Challenge.
Saving Lives!	2018	Healthcare	Healthcare learning game for medical professionals that teaches American Heart Association best practices for CPR.	iOS Tablets	AppClinic	Awarded a gold medal for excellence by the 2018 International Serious Play Awards Program.
JA Titan	2017	Finance	Financial literacy and business administration learning game for adolescent learners.	PC, Web Browser	Junior Achievement	
VR Explorations	2017	Various	Box set of printed books and immersive VR learning apps for consumers.	Cardboard VR (Android, iOS)	Publications International, Ltd.	
Square Panda (multiple titles)	2016	Language Arts	Custom hardware-integrated phonetics and reading games for young learners.	Tablets	Square Panda	
MSI Retail Sim	2015	Retail Management Fundamentals	Management fundamentals training game for adult learners in retail professions.	Web Browser, Tablets	McKinsey Social Initiative	
Inspire Science (multiple titles)	2015	Science	Curriculum-aligned science learning games for young learners.	Tablets, Web Browser	McGraw Hill Education	Morphy was nominated for Best Mobile Sites and Apps - Family and Kids in the 20th Annual Webby Awards (2016). Aquation: The Freshwater Access Game was nominated for Best Public Service and Activism Game in the 22nd Annual Webby Awards (2018).
mPower Math	2015	Math	Math learning games that teach critical thinking and problem-solving for young learners.	iOS Tablets, Web Browser	TVOntario	Awarded a silver medal for excellence by the 2017 International Serious Play Awards Program. The suite of games have been played by over 46,000 K-6 learners across Ontario.
That's Your Right!	2014	Civics, American Government	Browser-based multiplayer card game that teaches the Bill of Rights.	Web Browser	Annenberg Classroom	Named a Best Gameplay Finalist by the 2015 Games For Change Awards.
Smithsonian Science (multiple titles)	Various	Science, Language Arts	Curriculum-aligned science learning games for young learners.	Tablets, Web Browser	Smithsonian Science Education Center	
iCivics (multiple titles)	Various	Civics	Nationally recognized game-based learning platform and games for teaching civics.	Tablets, Web Browser	iCivics	
