= New literacies =

Forms of literacy made with digital technology

New literacies generally are new forms of literacy made possible by digital technology developments, although new literacies do not necessarily have to involve use of digital technologies to be recognized as such. The term "new literacies" itself is relatively new within the field of literacy studies (the first documented mention of it in an academic article title dates to 1993 in a text by David Buckingham). Its definition remains open, with new literacies being conceptualized in different ways by different groups of scholars.

For example, one group of scholars argues that literacy is now deictic, and see it as continually and rapidly changing as new technologies appear and new social practices for literacy emerge. (Leu, 2000). This group aims at developing a single, overarching theory to help explain new literacies (see, for example, Leu, O'Byrne, Zawilinski, McVerry, & Everett-Cacopardo, 2009; see also, below). This orientation towards new literacies is largely psycholinguistic in nature. Other groups of scholars follow a more sociocultural orientation that focuses on literacy as a social practice, which emphasizes the role of literacy with a range of socially patterned and goal-directed ways of getting things done in the world (see, for example, Gee & Hayes, 2012; Lankshear & Knobel, 2011; Kalantzis and Cope 2011).

Accompanying the varying conceptualizations of new literacies, there are a range of terms used by different researchers when referring to new literacies, including 21st century literacies, internet literacies, digital literacies, new media literacies, multiliteracies, information literacy, ICT literacies, and computer literacy. In the Handbook of New Literacies Research, Coiro, Knobel, Lankshear, and Leu (2008) note that all these terms "are used to refer to phenomena we would see as falling broadly under a new literacies umbrella" (pg. 10).

Commonly recognized examples of new literacies include such practices as instant messaging, blogging, maintaining a website, participating in online social networking spaces, creating and sharing music videos, podcasting and videocasting, photoshopping images and photo sharing, emailing, shopping online, digital storytelling, participating in online discussion lists, emailing and using online chat, conducting and collating online searches, reading, writing and commenting on fan fiction, collaborating on and writing encyclopedic wikis, processing and evaluating online information, creating and sharing digital mashups, etc. (see: Black, 2008; Coiro, 2003; Gee, 2007; Hunter, 2014; Jenkins, 2006; Kist, 2007; Lankshear & Knobel, 2006; Lessig, 2005; Leu, et al. 2004; Prensky, 2006).

== Definitions: at least two 'camps' ==
The field of new literacies is characterized by two theoretically distinct approaches that overlap to some extent. One is informed by cognitive and language processing theories such as cognitive psychology, psycholinguistics, schema theory, metacognition, constructivism, and other similar theories. This orientation includes a particular focus on examining the cognitive and social processes involved in comprehending online or digital texts (see for example: Leu, 2001; Leu, Kinzer, Coiro, & Cammack, 2004; Coiro, 2003; Coiro & Dobler, 2007). Donald Leu, a prominent researcher in the field of new literacies, has outlined four defining characteristics of new literacies, according to a largely psycholinguistic orientation (see: Leu et al., 2007). First, new technologies (such as the internet) and the novel literacy tasks that pertain to these new technologies require new skills and strategies to effectively use them. Second, new literacies are a critical component of full participation—civic, economic, and personal—in our increasingly global society. A third component to this approach is new literacies are deictic—that is, they change regularly as new technology emerges and older technologies fade away. With this in mind, "what may be important in reading instruction and literacy education is not to teach any single set of new literacies, but rather to teach students how to learn continuously new literacies that will appear during their lifetime." Finally, new literacies are "multiple, multimodal, and multifaceted," and as such, multiple points of view will be most beneficial in attempting to comprehensively analyze them. This orientation makes a distinction between "New Literacies" and "new literacies" theories. Lower case theories are better able to keep up with the rapidly changing nature of literacy in a deictic world since they are closer to the specific types of changes that are taking place and interest those who study them within a particular heuristic. Lower case theories also permit the field to maximize the lenses that are used and the technologies and contexts that are studied. This position argues that every scholar who studies new literacy issues is generating important insights for everyone else, even if they do not share a particular lens, technology, or context; and that this requires a second level of theorising. New Literacies (capitalized), it is argued, is a broader, more inclusive concept, and includes common findings emerging across multiple, lower case theories. New Literacies theory benefits from work taking place in the multiple, lower case dimensions of new literacies by looking for what appear to be the most common and consistent patterns being found in lower case theories and lines of research. This approach permits everyone to fully explore their unique, lowercase perspective of new literacies, allowing scholars to maintain close focus on many different aspects of the rapidly shifting landscape of literacy during a period of rapid change. At the same time, each also benefits from expanding their understanding of other, lowercase, new literacies perspectives. By assuming change in the model, everyone is open to a continuously changing definition of literacy, based on the most recent data that emerges consistently, across multiple perspectives, disciplines, and research traditions. Moreover, areas in which alternative findings emerge are identified, enabling each to be studied again, from multiple perspectives. From this process, common patterns emerge and are included in a broader, common, New Literacies theory. From this orientation, proponents argue, this process enables a particular theorization of New Literacies to keep up with consistent elements that will always define literacy on the Internet while it also informs each of the lower case theories of new literacies with patterns that are being regularly found by others.

The second approach to studying new literacies is overtly grounded in a focus on social practices. According to Colin Lankshear and Michele Knobel from this "social practice" perspectives, "new literacies" can refer to "new socially recognized ways of generating, communicating and negotiating meaningful content through the medium of encoded texts within contexts of participation in Discourses (or, as members of Discourses) ". From this perspective "new" refers to the presence of two dominant features of contemporary literacy practices. The first is the use of digital technologies as the means of producing, sharing, accessing and interacting with meaningful content. New literacies typically involve screens and pixels rather than paper and type, and digital code (that renders texts as image, sound, conventional text, and any combination of these within a single process) rather than material print. The second defining feature of new literacies is their highly collaborative, distributed, and participatory nature, as expressions of what Henry Jenkins calls engagement in participatory culture, and Lankshear and Knobel refer to as a distinctive ethos.

== Research in new literacies ==
Research within the field of new literacies is also diverse. A wide range of topics and issues are focused upon, and a broad range of methodologies are used.

=== Online research and comprehension ===
One aspect of new literacies that has attracted researchers' attention is school-age children's online research and comprehension. Specifically, researchers are interested in finding the answers to questions such as how reading online differs from traditional print-based reading. Donald Leu, Julie Coiro, Jill Castek, Laurie Henry, and others attempt to understand how students become adept at reading online to learn and how students acquire the necessary skills, strategies, and dispositions required to do so. Initial work in this area referred to online reading comprehension More recently, however, the construct "online research and comprehension" is being used since this more precisely describes the type of reading being described in their work. According to Leu and colleagues, the new literacies of online research and comprehension is a process of problem-based inquiry using information on the Internet. It includes the skills, strategies, dispositions, and social practices that take place as we read online information to learn and is based around five practices: "At least five processing practices occur during online research and comprehension: (1) reading to identify important questions, (2) reading to locate information, (3) reading to evaluate information critically, (4) reading to synthesize information, and (5) reading to communicate information. Within these five practices reside the skills, strategies, and dispositions that are distinctive to online reading comprehension as well as to others that are also important for offline reading comprehension (Leu, Reinking, et al., 2007)."

=== Online fan fiction and adolescents ===
Recent research in the field of new literacies has focused on fan fiction on the internet, especially those stories published online by adolescents (see for example: Black, 2008; Thomas, 2007; Jenkins, 2006). Online fan fiction websites, such as FanFiction.Net, are spaces where fans of all ages, but especially adolescents and younger school-age fans, are able to use these new information and communication technologies (ICTs) to write and craft fictional stories based on their favorite characters in popular media such as movies, television, and graphic novels. Adolescents are participating more and more on these kinds of sites, not only engaging with "pop culture and media, but also with a broad array of literate activities that are aligned with many school-based literacy practices"

Of course, adults are just as able to spend time in such online environments—and they do. However, it is interesting to consider that young people were born into a digitally rich world, and thus could be seen as "digital natives", and therefore interact with the online environment in a fundamentally distinct way than an older generation of people, so-called "digital immigrants". As digital natives, adolescents "use the online world to share, evaluate, create, report and program with each other differently to digital immigrants," and they engage easily and readily with new digital technologies such as instant messaging, file sharing songs and videos, and post all kinds of 'texts', stories, photos, and videos among them. A central characteristic of digital natives is their "desire to create." Digital natives are engaged in "programming to some extent, whether it be by including a piece of HTML code that personalizes a MySpace page or creating a Flash animation. They are creating web pages, blogs, avatars and worlds; and, in stark contrast to digital immigrants, digital natives readily report and share their ideas."

=== Video games ===
James Paul Gee described video gaming as a new literacy "in virtue of the ways game design involves a multimodal code comprising images, actions, words, sounds, and movements that players interpret according to gaming conventions". Gee notes that game players participate in their game's world as a form of social practice, especially in real-time strategy games in which players can compete with each other to build on land masses, for instance, and in which they can shape and convey their virtual identities as a certain kind of strategist. Video games continue to use new digital technologies to create the symbols players interpret to encode and decode the meanings that constitute the game. Many ways in which students learn literacies, increasingly, are happening outside of school rather than inside of school.

Other researchers have expanded the body of knowledge about video games as a new literacy, particularly as they relate to classroom learning (see for example: Lacasa, Martinez, & Mendez, 2008; Sanford & Madill, 2007). In one study, researchers examined how video games, supported by discussions and dramatic performances in the classroom, can contribute to the development of narrative thought as demonstrated in written compositions in various contexts. Namely, the researchers engaged primary school children in activities designed to teach them to tell, play out, and write stories based on the most popular video game in their classroom, Tomb Raider. Although it was a challenging process at times, researchers discovered that the use of new digital media such as video games actually "complements the use of other written or audiovisual methods [in the classroom] and permits the development of multiple literacies in the classroom."

== The classroom ==
It has become clear to many researchers in the field that new literacies research has important implications for the classroom. Kist (2007), for example, observes how new literacies can be used in classroom settings—from the use of rap music to anime to digital storytelling, there are already instances of teachers attempting to blend new literacies with traditional literacy practices in the classroom. Kist asks: "Can new literacies indeed 'fit' into how we currently 'do' school?" Kist notes that "the new literacies instruction that does exist often comes only out of the fortitude of lonely pioneers of new literacies."

Knobel and Lankshear (2011) argue that if educators and prospective teachers engage in blogging, or participate in "affinity spaces" devoted to practices like fan fiction, video game-playing, music and video remixing, photosharing, and the like, they will better understand how new literacies can better be integrated into worthwhile classroom learning.

Leu, Coiro, Castek, Hartman, Henry and Reinking (2008) have begun to explore the use of a modified instructional model of reciprocal teaching that reflects some of the differences between offline and online reading contexts. In an instructional model known as Internet Reciprocal Teaching, each student has his/her own laptop with access to the Internet and students work in small groups to facilitate interactive group work and discussions about strategy use. In addition, Internet Reciprocal Teaching with online informational resources (as opposed to narrative texts) and strategy instruction on both the common and unique processes by which students navigate through multiple and different texts, rather than the reading of one common text. Teachers and students model their choices about which links are most relevant to a group or individual question through think-alouds. They discuss how to efficiently locate information within different kinds of websites, how to synthesize ideas across multiple texts and media, how to make judgments about the quality of the information and the author's level of expertise, and how to best represent the answers to their questions. Responsibility for monitoring and effectively using these strategies to solve online information problems is gradually released to the students using an instructional scheme with three phases: Phase 1 includes direct, whole class instruction of basic skills and strategies of Internet use; Phase 2 includes group work and the reciprocal exchange of online reading comprehension strategies by students with their peers; and Phase 3 includes online individual inquiry units, sometimes with collaborative efforts involving other students in other classes, perhaps even in other parts of the world, and periodic strategy sessions with groups. Students "are the first generation to be global publishers to access the raw material of information and to create refined knowledge products for application. They understand the social skills of working with people who they will never meet face to face. They also understand that they need to take more responsibility for managing their own learning. They do not see the boundaries of school as a solid wall. They see school as a global communications center."

== See also ==
- Affinity space
- Digital literacy
- Discourse
- Participatory culture
- Electracy
- Social Media Language Learning
