= Games and learning =

Field of educational research

Games and learning is a field of education research that studies what is learned by playing video games, and how the design principles, data and communities of video game play can be used to develop new learning environments. Video games create new social and cultural worlds – worlds that help people learn by integrating thinking, social interaction, and technology, all in service of doing things they care about. Computers and other technologies have already changed the way students learn. Integrating games into education has the potential to create new and more powerful ways to learn in schools, communities and workplaces. Games and learning researchers study how the social and collaborative aspects of video gameplay can create new kinds of learning communities. Researchers also study how the data generated by gameplay can be used to design the next generation of learning assessments.

== Research ==
The games and learning research world studies how new digital media tools shift the topic of education research from recalling and repeating information to being able to find it, evaluate it and use it compellingly at the right time and in the right context. Games and learning research explores how games and game communities can lead to 21st-century educational skills such as higher order thinking, the ability to solve complex problems, think independently, collaborate, communicate and apply digital tools to effectively gather information.

Research shows the educational and social benefits of digital games. Games do not need to be specifically geared towards education to be educational tools. Games can bring together ways of knowing, ways of doing, ways of being, and ways of caring. As John Dewey argued, schools are built on an obsession with facts. Students need to learn by doing, and with gaming, students can learn by doing something as a part of a larger community of people who share common goals and ways of achieving those common goals, making gaming a benefit for social reasons as well. Gaming has also changed the look of content-driven curriculum in schools. In content-driven media, people learn by being told and reflecting on what they are told. In gaming, game designers create digital environments and game levels that shape, facilitate and even teach problem solving.

Games also teach students that failure is inevitable, but not irrevocable. In school, failure is a big deal. In games, players can just start over from the last save. A low cost failure ensures that players will take risks, explore and try new things.

Much of the debate about digital games for education was based on whether or not games are good for education. But that question is overly simplistic. The National Research Council's report on laboratory activities and simulations makes clear that the design and not merely the medium of a physical or virtual learning activity determines its efficacy. Digital games are a medium with certain affordances and constraints, just as physical labs and virtual simulations are media with certain affordances and constraints. Simulations and digital games actually share many similarities in this regard. Although there are multiple definitions for games, the key characteristics differentiating games from simulations involve the explicit inclusion of (a) rules for engaging with the simulation, (b) goals for players to pursue, and (c) means for indicating players' progress toward those goals. Properly designed, features of games can provide powerful affordances for motivation and learning. Individual studies have shown, for example, that well designed games can promote conceptual understanding and process skills, can foster a deeper epistemological understanding of the nature and processes through which science knowledge is developed and can produce gains in players' willingness and ability to engage in scientific practices and discourse.

In his book What Video Games Have to Teach Us About Learning and Literacy, James Paul Gee talks about the application and principles of digital learning. Gee has focused on the learning principles in video games and how these learning principles can be applied to the K-12 classroom. Successful video games are good at challenging players. They motivate players to persevere and teach players how to play. Gee's video game learning theory includes his identification of thirty-six learning principles, including: 1) Active Control, 2) Design Principle, 3) Semiotic Principle, 4) Semiotic Domain, 5) Meta-level Thinking, 6) Psychosocial Moratorium Principle, 7) Committed Learning Principle 8) Identity Principle, 9) Self-knowledge Principle, 10) Amplification of Input Principle, 11) Achievement Principle, 12) Practice Principle, 13) Ongoing Learning Principle, and 14) Regime of Competence Principle and more. Within these learning principles Gee shows the reader the various ways in which games and learning are linked and how each principle supports learning through gaming. One example would be Learning Principle 6: "Psychosocial Moratorium" Principle, where Gee explains that in games, learners can take risks in a space where real-world consequences are lowered. Another of Gee's principles, #8, that shows the importance of games and learning states that learning involves taking on and playing with identities in such a way that the learner has real choices (in developing the virtual identity) and ample opportunity to mediate on the relationship between new identities and old ones. There is tripartite play of identities as learners relate, and reflect on, their multiple real-world identities, a virtual identity, and a projective identity.

Other research takes the position that these standards and testing methods are not conducive to teaching methods that incorporate video games. Games alone will not make schools more efficient, cannot replace teachers or serve as an educational resource that can reach an infinite number of students. The extent of the roles games will play in learning remains to be seen. More research in this area is needed to determine impact of games and learning.

Peter Gray, who has conducted research on early childhood learning, states that gaming is purely a beneficial activity in young children. He states that children are able to choose how to most effectively use their time and that extensive use of a particular medium of learning shows they are taking something valuable from it. He goes on to state the significance of the computer in the modern age and that not utilizing it as a learning tool is simply foolish. Video gaming has shown positive levels of improvement in areas of cognitive function. In their study "Improving Multi-Tasking Ability through Action Videogames". Chiappe and colleagues determined that 50 hours of gaming significantly improved results on a performance test modeled after skills used when piloting an aircraft. Aside from this, areas of attention and vigilance, as well as basic visual processes have shown to improve with allotted video game time.

== Application ==
Digital learning tools have the potential of being customized to fit the abilities of individual students and can engage them with interactive tasks and simulate real-life situations. Games can create new social and cultural worlds that may not have been available to everyone in the past. These worlds can help people learn by integrating thinking, social interaction, and technology, all in service of doing things they care about.

Video games are important because they let people participate in and experience new worlds. They let players think, talk, and act in new ways. Indeed, players inhabit roles that are otherwise inaccessible to them. One example of a game where players are learning while playing would be The Sims, a real-time strategy game where players need to make decisions that alter their character's life. They can manipulate the scenario to create digital lives where they can experience the struggles of single parenthood or poverty. Players in this game are not allowed to modify a previous decision to alter the outcome, even if the outcome is unpleasant. The goal is to survive to the best of their abilities. The game is complicated and difficult, just as it would be to live a real life. Regarding a more traditional approach to education, The Sims has been used as a platform for students to learn a language and explore world history while developing skills such as reading, math, logic and collaboration.

While not all researchers agree, some recent studies have shown the positive effects of using games for learning. A study carried out by professor Traci Sitzmann at the University Oregon among 6,476 students states that "trainees in the game group had 11 percent higher factual knowledge levels, 14 percent higher skill-based knowledge levels, and 9 percent higher retention levels than trainees in the comparison group". Some other aggregated studies also show an increase in learning performance thanks to the use of videogames.

== Controversy ==
Critics suggest that lessons people learn from playing video games are not always desirable. Douglas Gentile, an associate professor of psychology at Iowa State University found that children who repeatedly play violent video games are learning thought patterns that will stick with them and influence behaviors as they grow older. Researchers from this study found that over time children started to think more aggressively, and when provoked at home, school or in other situations, children reacted much like they did when playing a violent video game. But even the harshest critics agree that people can learn something from playing video games. While research on the behavioral and cognitive impacts of video games with violence have shown mixed outcomes, games with little or no violence have shown promising results. Elizabeth Zelinski, a professor of gerontology and psychology at the University of Southern California states that some digital games have been shown to improve the function of the brain, while others have the potential to reverse cognitive loss associated with aging. Some games require players to make decisions ranging from simple to quite complex to drive its progress.

Some researchers question whether a greater reliance on video games is in students' best interests, indicating there is little proof that skillful game play translates into better test scores or broader cognitive development. Emma Blakey notes very few studies have examined whether video games improve classroom performance and academic achievement.

Others, like Emma Blakey, a PhD researcher in developmental psychology at the University of Sheffield in England, question whether a greater reliance on video games is in students' best interests, indicating there is little proof that skillful game play translates into better test scores or broader cognitive development.

== See also ==
- Educational game
- Educational video game
- Entertainment in education
- Gamification of learning
- Serious game
- Video games in education
