= ICivics =

American educational non-profit organization

iCivics
- Formerly: Our Courts (2009–2010)
- Genre: Educational
- Founded: August 7, 2009; 16 years ago
- Founder: Sandra Day O'Connor
- Headquarters: 1035 Cambridge Street, Suite 1 Cambridge, MA 02141
- Owner: iCivics Inc.
- Website: iCivics.org

iCivics, Inc. (formerly Our Courts) is a 501(c)(3) non-profit organization in the United States that provides educational online games and lesson plans to promote civics education and encourage students to become active citizens. iCivics was founded in 2009 by retired Supreme Court of the United States Justice Sandra Day O'Connor. iCivics's stated mission is to “ensure every student receives a high-quality civic education, and becomes engaged in – and beyond – the classroom.”

iCivics, inc. is supported by private donations and grants and had annual expenses of $2.2 million in 2015. Among the top contributors were the Gates Foundation and the MacArthur Foundation. In the same year, iCivics served more than 85,000 educators and 3 million students, including half of all middle school social studies classrooms in America.

== History ==
Justice O’Connor developed the Our Courts project in partnership with Georgetown University Law School and Arizona State University. In March 2009, Justice O'Connor went on The Daily Show with Jon Stewart to promote Our Courts and civics education. Our Courts added Supreme Decision and Do I Have A Right? to the website in August 2009. It was incorporated as iCivics, inc. in May 2010 as the variety of content and users began to expand more rapidly. A more comprehensive website was launched, supplementing the gaming modules with classroom lessons on the branches of government.

Above The Law sponsored a Do I Have A Right? challenge in 2010. Justice O'Connor was the keynote speaker at Games for Change in 2010, and iCivics was featured at the Games for Change conference in New York in 2011. The Washington Post Editorial Board highlighted the shortcomings of traditional civics education, and the efforts of iCivics.

In 2011 the website added seven games and 16 lesson plans, and had over 700,000 unique visitors. By 2013 it was the most widely adopted civics curriculum in America.

Currently, the governing board of iCivics includes U.S. Supreme Court Justice Sonia Sotomayor and Larry Kramer, president and vice-chancellor of the London School of Economics. The executive director of iCivics is Louise Dubé, previously managing director of Digital Learning at WGBH.

== Mission ==
Justice O’Connor initially envisioned Our Courts as a response to a perceived misunderstanding of the justice system in America. As keynote speaker at the NCSS annual conference in 2007, she noted “that while two-thirds of Americans know at least two judges on FOX Television’s ‘American Idol’ reality program, less than one in 10 can name the Chief Justice of the United States.” At present, ourcourts.org maintains this mission, but iCivics has a broader mission incorporating education on the legislative and executive branches of government as well as civics at a local level.

The organization focuses on broadly improving civics education but also on closing the civics education gap. O'Connor saw the state of civics education as a result of the failure of traditional education methods, as well as funding cuts and lower graduation requirements imposed by the No Child Left Behind Act. Our Courts collaborator James Gee, a professor of literacy at Arizona State University, convinced her that educational games were the key to civics education, due to their capacity to teach problem solving.

iCivics games have been evaluated for their educational effectiveness in a handful of research studies. Branches of Power was shown to be both engaging and educational for a majority of students in a test group. A significant number of students also play the games again at home, greatly increasing absorption of concepts and improving test scores. The general iCivics curriculum has been shown to be an effective mechanism for education on civics topics as measured by scores on the US citizenship test. It was particularly effective among younger students in grades 4-6 and less effective among high school seniors. The interactive writing exercise Drafting Board also improved persuasive writing skills among 8th graders.

The organization is currently working on extending its curriculum to high school and reaching more high school educators. It currently serves one in four high school government and history teachers.

== Content ==
iCivics hosts lesson plans, games, online workshops and other materials for teachers and students of American civics. All online materials are free to registered users.

=== Games ===
iCivics currently hosts twenty different educational games, developed in partnership with Filament Games (with the exception of Supreme Decision, produced with Studio Mobile, Cabengo and the Center for Children & Technology). Curriculum and design of each game is provided by employees of iCivics, and dart, programming, and sound design is provided by Filament.

- Argument Wars – Players argue one of several landmark Supreme Court cases.
- Branches of Power – Players control the three different branches of federal government.
- Cast Your Vote – Players interview candidates for office in a debate setting and try to vote for the one they most agree with.
- Counties Work – Players control a municipal government, balancing taxes with public services and helping the community grow.
  - Counties Work: Texas – A Texan variation of the Counties Work game.
- Convene the Council – Players take on the role of President of the United States and make foreign policy decisions with the support of their National Security Council.
- Court Quest – Players help citizens resolve cases by guiding them through the different parts of the court system.
- Do I Have A Right? – Players field a team of specialist lawyers in Constitutional litigation cases.
  - Do I Have A Right?: Bill of Rights Edition – Players field a team of lawyers with specialties in each of the first ten amendments.
- Executive Command – Players take on the role of the President of the United States; they give the State of the Union speech, sign legislation, run the departments of the executive branch, negotiate with other branches of government and other nations, and decide on military aid, war and diplomacy efforts.
- Immigration Nation – Players decide who is allowed to immigrate to the US by determining their citizenship, work visa or refugee status.
- Lawcraft – Players bring a bill through Congress, compromising with other legislators and adding amendments until it passes and becomes law.
- News Feed Defenders – Players moderate their own news aggregation site to determine fact from viral deception, hidden ads, and bad posts.
- People's Pie – Players fund government programs without setting tax rates too high or borrowing too much money.
- Race to Ratify – Players take on the role of a pamphleteer in 1787 and attempt to sway public opinion either for or against the ratification of the new Constitution.
- Win the White House – Players manage a presidential campaign by strategically raising funds, polling voters, launching media campaigns, and making personal appearances. Attempt to win the majority of electoral votes.
- Constitutional Compromise – Players test their knowledge and create compromises based on real arguments in the Constitutional Convention.
- Brief the Chief – Players advise U.S. presidents through major moments in U.S. history.
- Uncovering Loyalties – Set in the Colony of Virginia, players record the conversations of several people to learn about their views after the Boston Tea Party and just before the beginning of the revolution.
- Neighborhood Good – Players meet with neighbors to make a plan to help the community.
- Investigation Declaration – Players track Enlightenment ideas to and through the U.S. Declaration of Independence.

=== Lesson plans ===
Lesson plans on iCivics are provided for free, with content and curriculum guidance provided by iCivics staff. These plans emphasize student engagement by including activities such as crosswords and short quizzes as well as references to their online games. Units of study include the history and development of the Constitution, the branches and levels of government, the rights and duties of citizens, politics and policy, and international affairs. Beyond education on government, there is also a unit on persuasive writing. A set of lessons developed with the Boys & Girls Clubs of America was designed to be used during their meetings instead of a traditional school period.
