= Educational video game =

Video game genre

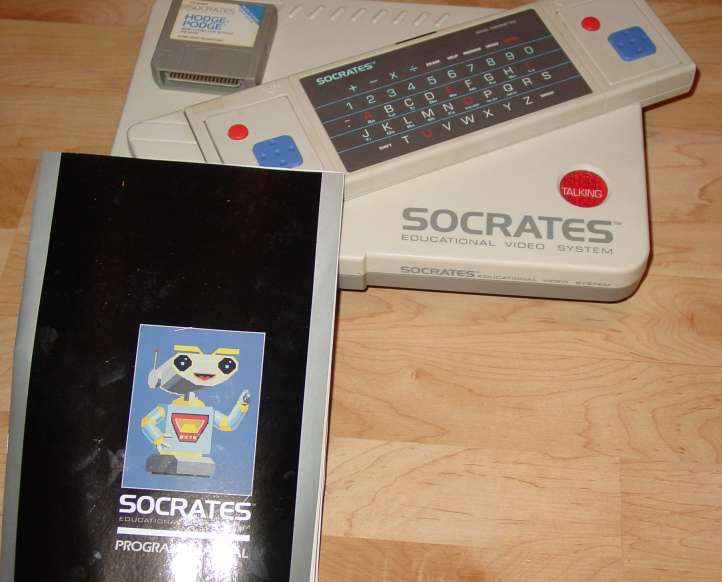
Socrates, a VTech educational video game

An educational video game is a video game that provides learning or training value to the player. Edutainment describes an intentional merger of video games and educational software into a single product (and could therefore also comprise more serious titles sometimes described under children's learning software). In the narrower sense used here, the term describes educational software which is primarily about entertainment, but tends to educate as well and sells itself partly under the educational umbrella. Normally software of this kind is not structured towards school curricula and does not involve educational advisors.

Educational video games play a significant role in the school curriculum for teachers who seek to deliver core lessons, reading and new skills. Gamification of education allows learners to take active roles in learning and develop technological skills that are needed for their academic and professional careers. Several recent studies have shown that video games, whether violent or not can help children in the development of intellectual and emotional skills that support their academic achievement (Chang et al., 2009). These findings have made teachers all over the world recognize the numerous benefits of gaming and to include educational video game learning in their curricula.

== Definition ==
Educational video games can be categorized into two classes:

- Edutainment games are those designed around drilling subject matter to the user in a linear manner, while wrapping the game with entertainment aspects.
- Educational video games are aimed to encourage creative thinking and problem solving, and encourage greater interactivity from the user, often presented in non-linear experiences.

Most educational and edutainment games are purposely developed for use within the classroom or at home to teach students. However, a number of core video games which were not purposely built for educational purposes have found use for education. Such games include strategy war games that include historical references, like the Total War franchise or the Age of Empires trilogy and an in-game encyclopaedia like Civilization. These games often integrate education without being explicitly educational. These are games which were originally developed for adults or older children and which have potential learning implications. For the most part, these games provide simulations of different kinds of human activities, allowing players to explore a variety of social, historical and economic processes.

Examples:

- City-building games such as the SimCity series and Caesar (1993–2006) invite players to explore the social, practical and economic processes involved in city management;
- Empire-building games such as the Civilization series (1991–2013) and the Europa Universalis series (2000–2014) help players to learn about history and its political, economic and military aspects;
- Railroad management games such as Railroad Tycoon (1990–2003) and Rails Across America (2001) illuminate the history, engineering and economics of railroad management.
- Geography games such as PlaceSpotting (2008–2009) and GeoGuessr help players to find locations on Earth according to some hints.
- Physics games such as Quantum Moves and A Slower Speed of Light aim to impart intuition for complicated physics concepts such as quantum mechanics and special relativity.
- Geometry games with non-Euclidean geometry, such as HyperRogue and Hyperbolica, aim to impart intuition for how non-Euclidean spaces such as hyperbolic and spherical spaces work.
- Trading and commerce-based games such as The Patrician challenge players to create and grow a trading empire, managing, acquiring, processing, transporting, and bartering resources within a limited region.

The game has been enthusiastically received in some educational circles and are mentioned in academic literature.

A new category was recently started by Bot Colony (2013). It lets players practice English dialogue by conversing with intelligent robots as part of an adventure game.

== Design ==
Many titles were developed and released from the mid-1990s onwards, aimed primarily at the home education of young children. Later iterations of these titles often began to link educational content to school curricula such as England's National Curriculum. The design of educational games for home use has been influenced by gaming concepts – they are designed to be fun and educational.

Examples of children's learning software with a structured pedagogical approach, usually oriented towards literacy and numeracy skills.

- Disney Interactive learning titles based on characters such as Winnie-the-Pooh, Aladdin, The Jungle Book and Mickey Mouse
- GCompris, contains numerous activities, from computer discovery to science
- Knowledge Adventure's JumpStart and Blaster Learning System series
- The Learning Company's Reader Rabbit, The ClueFinders and Zoombinis series.

One of the prominent trends in online education today is online colouring websites, which help children develop creativity and practice fine motor skills. For example, the coloring book website provides hundreds of images for children to freely colour online. This is a fun tool to help children relax and learn through art.

According to research, play-based learning can improve children's thinking and creativity, encouraging children to explore the world around them more naturally. Hirsh-Pasek is a famous researcher in the field of child psychology and education. She is one of the advocates of integrating learning through play into the curriculum, emphasizing that children learn better when participating in interesting and interactive activities.

== History ==
The early mainframe game The Sumerian Game (1964) was, while not the first resource management game, the first designed for elementary school students. In 1970 Abt published a book on the topic: "Serious games: The art and science of games that simulate life.".

Educational games became more popular in the early 1980s due to a number of factors. The video game crash of 1983 caused the console market in the United States to collapse, displaced by the growing home computer market. Further, the arcade game market was partially affected by the crash, but also had become stigmatized by a new moral panic around video game arcades due to perceived connections to violence and video game addiction. Computer game developers looked to take advantage of the situation by creating education games for home computer systems which would not only satisfy children's entertainment but would please parents and educators. In September 1983 the Boston Phoenix reported that "edutainment" games were a new focus area for companies after end of growth of the Atari 2600 software market. In 1983, the term "edutainment" was used to describe a package of software games for the Oric 1 and Spectrum Microcomputers in the UK. Dubbed "arcade edutainment," an advertisement for the package can be found in various issues of "Your Computer" magazine from 1983. The software package was available from Telford ITEC, a government-sponsored training program. The originator of the name was Chris Harvey, who worked at ITEC at the time.

Since then, many other computer games such as Electronic Arts's Seven Cities of Gold, released in 1984, have also used edutainment as a descriptive term. Most edutainment games seek to teach players by employing a game-based learning approach. Criticism as to which video games can be considered educational has led to the creation of "serious games" whose primary focus is to teach rather than entertain.

Psychologist [Simon Egenfeldt-Nielsen] researched the educational use and potential of computer games and has written many articles on the subject. One paper dealing specifically with edutainment breaks it down into 3 general categories to separate the cognitive methods most predominantly used to teach. He is critical of the research that has been done on the educational use of computer games, citing their biases and weaknesses in method, which cause their findings to lack scientific validity.

== In education ==
Games provide structure to problem-solving. This allows a player to "fail up", meaning that with the combination of challenging, fun and identity-building, the student will want to continue to persist on that problem until it is solved. It is a productive failure. This may take quite a few times before success is reached, but progress is obtained each time and so is knowledge of how to solve that problem. Iteration and discovery become two major aspects to learning through game playing. Many students have a "sweet spot" for gaming, which allows gaming in education to be successful in terms of grasping concepts, while this can be more difficult through the use of a book. Students may not even realize that they are learning through a game. Games need to include novelty. Unexpected occurrences and challenging choices allow the player to want to keep playing. Having a story or narrative in the game is what can really suck a player into the game. It allows for continuous feedback and challenges at the right level of difficulty, while avoiding frustration.

When developing successful learning games for the classroom, it can be a challenging task. In order for the game to show achievement in student learning, the game should have certain qualities. The development of successful games to promote learning requires attention to opposing factors. Creativity and inventiveness are needed to help the outcome work well and run smoothly. Games should take the opposite approach of drill-and-practice principles, as this simplifies the games and limits the domains of knowledge. The three factors to keep in mind when designing strong and successful games are integration, motivation, and focus. In order for the player to progress in the game, they must master the learning goals and objectives behind the game. The game should be integrated with learning goals. In the content that needs to be taught through the game, it should be made a point that in order to succeed in the game, is to know the information, which creates importance to the player. The game needs to be as motivating as possible and should pose a challenge. The primary activity of the game should be interacting and interesting to the students. Games are about decision making, where one sees what the consequences are and what feedback one receives. Games teach students about rewards, but that it takes some work to receive those rewards. The actions within the game need to be relevant to life outside the game, so learning can occur. Focus can most successfully occur when one is learning by exploring, operating, or interacting.

Teachers are using games more regularly that focus on a wide variety of objectives, while exposing students to more game genres and devices. There is much more structure, which makes it a lot easier for the teacher, and the students enjoy it. Students have become so fluent with the use of online tools. Learning data can be generated from the use of online games, which allow the teacher to have insight on the knowledge the children have obtained, and what needs improvement; this can then help a teacher with their curriculum and teaching.

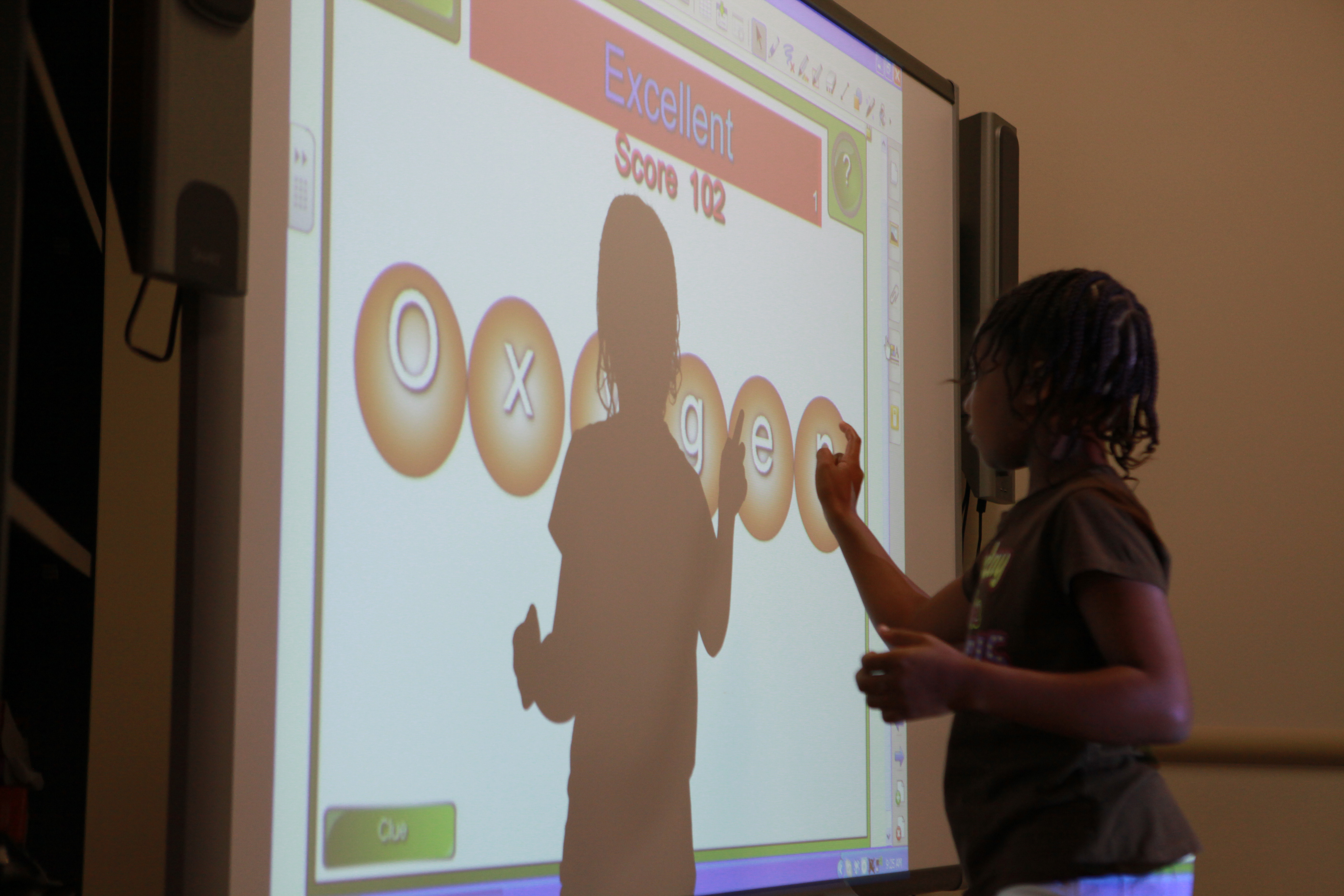
A student uses a Smart Board in class.

A nationwide study of 488 K–12 teachers in the United States found that, as of 2013, over half were using digital games in the classroom weekly. Most classrooms nowadays have replaced the traditional blackboard for the Smart Board, bringing technology into the classroom. As we move forward into the digital age, most schools provide lessons on computer literacy to ensure students are fluent when it comes to technology. Likewise, the use of well-designed educational video games delivers game based learning that can motivate students to participate more enthusiastically in subjects, including those that are often less popular. It is also noted that educational video games offer more interaction, immediate feedback, to both student and teacher, and more student control. Educational video games that involve aspects of reality, provide students with opportunities to be involved in an interactive environment that they would not ordinarily be allowed to participate in but from the safety of a classroom.

As video games spread in the 1980s, the educational potential of them was researched. Its findings showed that the visual and motor coordination of game players was better than that of non-players. Initial research also indicated the importance of electronic games for children who proved to have difficulty learning basic subjects and skills. It also found that:

- Video games helped students to identify and attempt to correct their deficiencies.
- The adaptability of video games, and the control that players have over them, motivate and stimulate learning.
- In cases where students have difficulty concentrating, video games can be highly useful.
- Promote critical awareness of discourse communities.
- The instant feedback given by video games help arouse curiosity and in turn allows for greater chances of learning.
- Video games teach cooperation.

One common argument for the use of video games in education is that they enable learning from the simulation while having no danger associated with mistakes. For instance, the Air Force uses piloting simulations in order to teach their pilots how to fly the airplanes. These simulations are meant to prepare the training pilot for real-world flight conditions while at the same time preventing any damage or loss of life in the process. A pilot could crash in the simulation, learn from their mistake and then reset and try again. This process leads to distinct levels of mastery over the simulation and in turn the plane they will also be flying in the future. The military also utilizes games such as the ARMA and Socom franchises in their training. Games like these immerse the gamer into the realm of the game and will attempt to achieve whatever objective is set out for them using their tactical skills. This allows for the military to show their soldiers how to engage certain situations without the risk of injury.

Games of all types have been shown to increase a different array of skills for players. Attempts have been made to show that arcade-style action and platforming games can be used to develop motor co-ordination, manual skills, and reflexes. Many authors have noted the educational potential of games like The Sims (for its social simulation) or the Civilization series (for its historical and strategy elements), concluding that video games as a whole promote intellectual development, and suggest that players can use them to develop knowledge strategies, practice problem-solving, and can improve spatial skills. While specific video games have been used, other study-type games were created specifically to aid students in studying for educational classes.

=== Comparison with a classroom model ===
Video games have been found to be more engaging in a classroom environment; instead of providing information over an extended class period, games provide small amounts of information at relevant stages. Playing video games helps students with metacognition; strong metacognitive skills have been proven to help with developing academic skills and allows students to learn about their strengths and weaknesses as well as increase their academic performance. Video games that are used as objects of study in classroom can enable students to be skilled rhetorical readers by exposing literature and language from different discourse communities and by encouraging students to practice reading the symbolic structure of inherently consumption-based video games. The use of video games in the classroom is a model that has been used for over a decade, regardless of it not being a widespread idea and procedure in every K-12 classroom.

Multimedia learning includes various visualizations that can be used by students to engage with the material and analyze concepts in a differing way. Multimedia learning in this sense, allows students to engage with material in a modern way that is relevant and known to them. This form of learning enables an intersection between entertainment and informational platforms, creating a hybridized form of engagement with content. When it comes to using multimedia learning, students are able to receive information in a different way compared to the traditional classroom setting.

Multimedia learning allows students to be more active in the learning process. One example of this could be students changing information in a problem to see different results. However, this is not necessarily as simple as it sounds. For this type of learning to work, students must have enough background on the subject in order to continue to build knowledge. Otherwise, students are not able to use multimedia learning as effectively. When they do have this background information, results from one study showed that the increase in activity that occurs during multimedia learning can improve the way in which students learn.

=== Use ===
Several studies have attempted to answer, "How and to what extent are games used in the classroom?" In one study, fifty-three Swedish ESL teachers were surveyed; the outcome determined was that video games in the classroom were barely utilized. Although the teachers were open to the idea, they did not identify the benefits of applying video games to the curriculum. Video games created excitement, not for learning, but for the games.

While there are people who do not agree with the idea of using video games in the classroom, others are open- minded to the experiment. Video games are an interactive entertainment. They promote intellectual skills that support academic achievement. In supplying students with educational subject matter, they demonstrated further advantage. Making use of video games in the classroom is simply another technique to engage with students.

A study was conducted in a "3 week intervention with game- based learning activities in eight lower secondary classrooms." The study found that video games are a motivation to the students who do not find educational settings interesting. The purpose of the study was to increase engagement and participation of students. Class participation increases retention of the material. Encouragement for student involvement in the classroom is distinctly recommended.

==== Possible benefits ====
Some teachers have attempted to use video games within a classroom setting. There is some evidence which shows that for young children, educational video games promote student engagement.

Video games are inherently incentive-based systems with the player being rewarded for solving a problem or completing a mission, while meeting certain criteria. As a result, video games train a systematic way of thinking as well as an understanding for how different variables affect each other. Furthermore, video games can constantly and automatically assess the learner's ability at any given moment due to the software-based nature of the medium; modular education structures tend to deliver assessments in large chunks and present a relatively limited picture of student progress. Multiple research articles have suggested that this mode of learning can be more enjoyable and show positive outcomes on student motivation, finding game was equal or more effective than conventional instruction.

Video games such as Minecraft and Portal have been suggested as platforms for teachers to experiment with their educational abilities. Minecraft is a sandbox game in which the user can create objects using the crafting system, while Portal is a physics game: the player uses the laws of physics, such as gravity and inertia, to advance through the game's series of test chambers. Critical thinking and problem solving are inherent in the latter game's design. Both Minecraft and Portal are adaptable to some learning environments; for instance, Minecraft has been used for young children while Portal has been used by high school physics teachers. Portal 2 has also been used to develop cognitive skills in older undergraduate students, however. A 2017 study found that games including Portal 2, Borderlands 2, Gone Home and Papers, Please may be used to develop a range of skills in undergraduate students, such as communication, resourcefulness and adaptability.

One study showed that using a video game as part of class discussions, as well as including timely and engaging exercises relating the game to class material, can improve student performance and engagement. Instructors assigned groups of students to play the video game SPORE in a freshman undergraduate biology course on evolution. The group of students that was assigned to play SPORE and complete related exercises, in a total of five sessions throughout the semester, had average class scores about 4% higher than the non-gaming group. The game's inaccuracies helped to stimulate critical thinking in students; one student said it helped her understand "the fine parts of natural selection, artificial selection, survival of the fittest, and genetic diversity because of the errors within the game. It was like a puzzle." However, because the game was accompanied by additional exercises and instructor attention, this study is not overwhelming evidence for the hypothesis that video games in isolation increase student engagement.

Students who have played Europa Barbarorum had knowledge of historical geography beyond the scope taught during the basic ancient history course. They were able to identify the most important stages of civilization development in the case of states of the Hellenistic era and were very knowledgeable about military history and history of art. This knowledge was in large part derived from the comprehensive descriptions included in the game; students also admitted that after playing the game they were much more eager to turn to books dealing with the given historical period. However, Whether or not this intention materialized into more reading of historical periods is not clear.

Another source studied teachers using Civilization III in high school history classrooms, both during and after school. In this study, not all students were in favor of using the game. Many students found it too difficult and tedious. Some students, particularly high-performing students, were concerned about how it could affect their studies; they felt that "Civilization III was insufficient preparation for the 'game' of higher education." However, students who were failing in the traditional school setting often did significantly better in the game-based unit, and the game seemed to get their attention where traditional schooling did not.

According to an article on interactive video games in physical education, many of these types of games are not just animated exercise. Many have different assessments and scores based on performance of skills. Some have heart rate monitors and estimate caloric expenditure. Others are designed with enhancing motor abilities in mind. Abilities such as balance, hand-eye coordination, agility and core strength are a few of the motor skills enhanced. These engaging and interactive games have the ability to teach kids about the some physiological functions of the body. One example is that these games can help show kids how their heart reacts to different activities by using the heart rate monitor within the game.

One study took the game Semideus to see if it could help to improve performance on rational number tasks, the understanding of whole numbers and mathematical thinking in general. The study concluded if kids were introduced to games that have math well integrated into the gameplay then it kids then it will help them with their skills. The study recommended that the teacher be involved in the game based learning to improve its effectiveness in the students learning.

According to journal article, simulation video games makes the player to learn to think critically while gaining knowledge of the environment. The player learns to solve problems through trial and error. Players are able to learn by doing. They learn by experiencing things first-hand and role-playing. These virtual environments enable better learning, collaboration, and enhanced practical reasoning skills.

In some disciplines, games are being specifically designed to enhance learning in challenging concepts, such as anatomy and physiology within a medical degree.

The digital skills cultivated through gaming could serve as a foundation for careers requiring advanced technological proficiency, including pathways in computer science. Despite this potential, female participation in gaming and technology often stagnates at basic levels of digital interaction—such as passive consumption of content created by others—resulting in persistent underrepresentation of women in technology-related industries. Addressing this imbalance requires examining how gendered engagement patterns with digital tools emerge early in development.

Educational gaming can bolster self-efficacy among both young girls and boys. Research indicates that by age seven, children internalize gendered norms surrounding technology preferences and self-perceived competence in gaming and digital skills. Educational video games, for example, can give boys chances to sharpen skills like reading, creativity, teamwork, and critical thinking. These games mix learning challenges into interactive, hands-on environments where boys have greater control, which helps them build confidence in their ability to tackle tech-related tasks and see themselves as capable. On the other hand, girls often end up feeling less confident in their tech skills because of social and cultural factors that quietly shape their motivation and interests from a young age. The separation of girls from gaming creates a cycle that's hard to break: when girls spend less time practicing, put in less effort, or do not develop the same interest in digital tools, their confidence and engagement drop. How much they enjoy gaming, how often they pick up devices, and whether they believe they are good with tech feed into whether they stick with video games or drift away. The introduction of education games to young girls early on, before technological gendered norms are established, can bring girls into the technological scene. When educational games make tech feel exciting and for them—not just for boys—it can create a fascination for digital skills and change how girls see gaming. Instead of thinking of gaming as something only for boys seeking entertainment, they may start connecting it to their own creativity, like solving puzzles or building something cool. Little by little, this change in mindset could help more girls lean into STEM subjects, such as, but not limited to: coding, robotics, data analysis, and computer science. The introduction of young girls into STEM creates a possibility for them to later step into careers like software development or engineering, fields usually men-dominated. Early exposure can rewrite the story girls tell themselves about who belongs in tech. If young girls grow up feeling capable and connected to gaming and technology, the confidence they establish can affect classrooms, career choices, and possibly the entire working industry.

Beyond skill acquisition, video games enable students to analyze and address complex real-world problems through experiential learning. A pedagogical study illustrates this using Plague Inc: Evolved, a strategy-based simulation game where players design pathogens to infect global populations. Students completed a multi-stage writing assignment: first, they documented iterative refinements to their in-game strategies across multiple playthroughs; second, they analyzed how the logic underlying these strategies could enhance their approaches to real-world challenges, such as ethical dilemmas or systemic issues encountered in daily life. This whole process of looking inward pushed students to dig into how they solve problems, sparking more profound ethical questions as they took a hard look at their thought processes. When they started connecting the dots between choices they made in the game and challenging situations in real life, it got them thinking about how their gut reactions to complicated issues—like what feels "right" or urgent—are quietly steered by their personal beliefs and what they care about most, even if they don't realize it at the time. The study highlights gaming's unique potential to cultivate ethical reasoning by allowing players to experiment with alternative perspectives and actions within low-stakes, immersive environments. While other mediums can similarly stimulate critical thinking, digital games offer distinct advantages by enabling players to inhabit dynamic, choice-driven narratives that mirror real-life consequences.

Educational video games also demonstrate measurable benefits for early childhood development. A study by Geetha et al. investigated how tablet-based games affect foundational numerical and cognitive skills in kindergarteners from diverse socioeconomic backgrounds. Children were randomly assigned to three groups: one played a number-focused game targeting counting and arithmetic, another engaged with a working memory (WM) game requiring pattern recognition, and a control group played a color-matching game with no explicit skill focus. Over ten sessions, the number game group showed significant gains in numerical knowledge, including counting accuracy and understanding of quantity relationships—improvements that persisted a month post-intervention. In contrast, the WM group did not outperform the control group in math skills, though both the number and WM games enhanced working memory capacity. Notably, WM gains in the memory-focused group continued to grow even after the study concluded, suggesting sustained cognitive benefits. These findings underscore the potential of targeted digital games to strengthen domain-specific skills and domain-general cognitive abilities in young learners, providing scalable tools to address educational inequities early in development.

==== Possible negative effects ====
One argument for possible negative effects explains how kids are already spending too much time with technology outside the classroom. It explains that over seven and a half hours a day are being used by children eight to eighteen on media outside of school. With the large amount of time technology is being used by children, this argument claims that the time spent on screens may be replacing critical face to face communication may be negatively affecting children's face to face communication skills. To find out if this was true or not an experiment was done where two groups were taken from the same school. One group went to a camp where they had many different bonding activities without access to a screen throughout the course of five days. While the second group remained at school and were allowed to use their screens how they normally do. To test their face to face communication skills both groups took before and post tests for comparison. The results suggested that those who went away for the five days did much better in reading facial emotion than the control group.

==== Barriers to the use of games ====
Many teachers have reservations about using video games. One study asked teachers who had some experience using games in class why they did not do it more often. Six general categories of factors were identified as problem areas:

- Inflexibility of curriculum: Teachers find it difficult to integrate games with the already-set curriculum present in classrooms. It can be difficult to locate a game that is educational as well as fun. And many teachers have no experience in using games to teach. Learning with games may not be accepted by skeptical parents who personally learned with more conventional techniques. The interdisciplinary field of game studies has offered a variety of perspectives to complement traditional modes of rhetorical analysis and production, which should be adapted to address the unique affordances of video games as a medium in contrast to the traditional banking model of education.
- Stigma: Video games are considered children's play or a leisurely pastime for the adolescent population. Video games are thought to distract children from the seriousness of academics and are considered an unproductive activity.
- Psychological issues: Gaming can promote student addiction as well as physical problems. Students may also lose their desire to learn in the traditional setting. It can also remove teacher control and result in "excessive competition".
- Students' lack of readiness: Students have varying levels of skill and computer literacy, which may be affected by their socioeconomic status. It takes time to teach them the rules of games, and games are harder for them to understand than traditional audiovisuals.
- Lack of supporting materials: Teachers do not have access to supporting text or work for students to do alongside games.
- Fixed class schedules: Teachers have time constraints and their school may not allow them to use games. More sophisticated games, often yielding the most learning content, often take hours to learn, and more time to play. The tutorials for Civilization V take an hour to finish, and complete games can take tens of hours.
- Limited budgets: Computer equipment, software, and fast Internet connections are expensive and difficult for teachers to obtain.
- Relevance to Common Core: The educational systems is increasingly driven by standardized testing focused on assessment of common core topics. Games exist for these topics (glasslabgames.org) but gameplay is generally not competitive with commercial video games.

Some teachers were more concerned about some problems than others. Male teachers were less concerned about limited budgets, fixed class hours, and the lack of supporting materials than were female teachers. Inexperienced teachers would be more worried about fixed class schedules and the lack of supporting materials than were experienced teachers.

When it comes to educational video games and higher education, a study was conducted to explore the relationship between teachers' perceptions of the games and their use in the classroom. In addition, researchers were interested in whether factors such as age and gender may have an influence on the results, which has already been found to play a role in the context of video games in a leisure setting as opposed to educational.

While there were no indicators that gender and age had an effect, this study introduces the claim that training programs for teachers in higher education should not focus on the fact that using video games in the classroom is simple and uncomplicated. This is because the results actually showed that it does not matter whether or not teachers perceive using educational games as easy or not.

Instead, teachers that perceived these games in a positive way were more likely to incorporate them into their curriculum. More specifically, this means that the most significant factor in regards to if teachers will use video games is whether or not they perceive them to be a useful tool for teaching students. If not, the probability of teachers' using games decreases.

== Effectiveness ==
The use of video games in the classroom is a widely debated topic amongst scholars and teachers alike. With this, the effectiveness of the use of video games, as well as whether or not it should be considered is widely researched. Regardless of research, video games are widely used in classrooms to this day, especially with younger children.

Since video games were first introduced into the classroom, teachers were worried that due to the violent nature of most games on the market, they would not be a good fit for teaching students. Most teachers were also worried about the cost of hardware, if the technology would even teach the students anything, and that the students might get distracted. However, those teachers were also open to the idea of using video games if they were to become more viable.

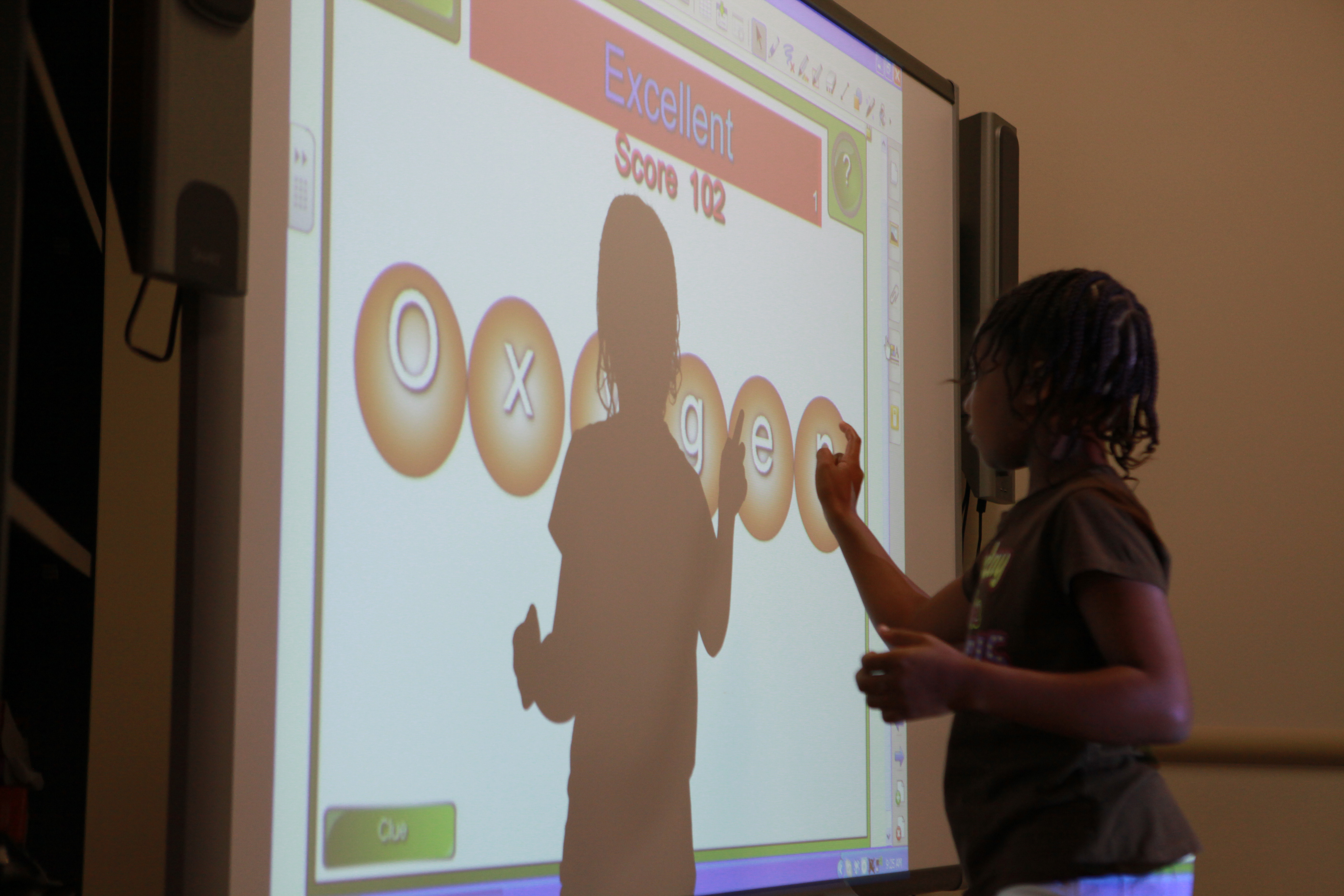
Student using a smartboard to play an educational video game

Students were also seen to be skeptical of the actual use of video games as a method of learning, with the skill needed to play some video games also being taken into consideration. Some children are not exposed to video games and as such, the skill gap between them and those students which have experience playing video games may cause an unfair advantage in the learning environment.

Despite these negative reactions towards the use of video games in learning, the use of educational video games has only increased since it was first introduced. In fact, research has shifted from the reception of video games in the classroom to how to make videogames more effective in the classroom. Looking at things such as design, narrative, and story pacing.

Some researchers have shown that these aspects of video games can improve their effectiveness because of the basic idea behind video games. That being intrinsic and extrinsic rewards for actions by the player, which influences the player to continue playing and thus learning, setting new goals and thus improving their effectiveness. In a 2006 study, it was recommended that 3D environments be used for educational video games because it could help improve spatial awareness and help students contextualize learning.

As for narrative, there is no clear indication on what techniques could be used to make learning more effective, however there is wide debate on two sides. One side says that the linear nature of video game stories will hinder the creativity of children and should not be used. The other side says that the linear storytelling approach is helpful because it encourages learning, following an approach which allows the player to play a zone and then view a scene and ultimately build out the entire story.

== Learning from video games outside the classroom ==
Commercial video games in general, referred to as commercial off the shelf (COTS) games, have been suggested as having a potentially important role to assist learning in a range of crucial transferable skills. One example of this would be in first-person shooter games such as the Call of Duty franchise (although these games are violent by nature, and they have been subject to massive negative reception by parents with varying justification). While the Call of Duty franchise itself falls short of actual tactical strategy or realism in depth, there are many games in the same genre (first-person shooters) from which one can learn key skills from the games: they stimulate the player at the cognitive level as they move through the level, mission, or game as a whole. They also teach strategy, as players need to come up with ways to penetrate enemy lines, stealthily avoid the enemy, minimize casualties, and so on. Players can test their usage of these skills using the multiplayer aspect of these games. These games also allow players to enhance their peripheral vision, because they need to watch for movement on the screen and make quick decisions about whether it is a threat, to avoid wasting ammunition or harming allied players.

Other games, such as the Guitar Hero and Rock Band franchises, have been used to provide insight to the basic nature of education in video games. Success at these games requires the player to first fail multiple times – this is the only way to learn the proper actions. These games also provide real-time feedback on how well the player is doing, an area in which traditional educational systems are lacking. The main advantage with video games is that there is nothing to lose from failing, unlike in real life, where failing usually results in negative consequences.

Games similar in nature to Animal Crossing give the opportunity for its players to practice multiple life applicable skills such as time management, materialistic value, investing in payment plans, skill building, and more day to day neighborhood based activities. The value of the cutesy, animated, animal characters who each execute neighborliness in the video game foster a friendship value that primarily focuses on the social practices learned while playing the game. Players may experience an increase in comprehension, evaluation, and deliberate skills that are gained from playing this animated game that sends out messages about cultural, social, or political practices.

A research project involving positive use of video games is outlined in an article that focuses on studies that suggest there are health benefits to playing video games. This article presents information from studies from the University of Utah, Deakin University in Melbourne, Australia, 2009's Annual Review of Cybertherapy and Telemedicine, University of Washington, Visual Development Lab of Ontario's McMaster University, University of Rochester in New York, and North Carolina State University. The researchers from these universities found that video games are therapeutic for children with chronic illnesses, can improve preschoolers' motor skills, reduce stress and depression, provide relief from pain, improve vision, improve decision-making skills, and maintain happiness in old age as well.

One study suggests that commercial video games can help players to improve in certain skills such as communication, resourcefulness, and adaptability. In this study undergraduate students were assigned at random to be in either an intervention or a control group. To measure adaptability, resourcefulness and communication, there were self-report instruments given to both groups.

== Special educational needs ==
Children of all kinds thrive during play-based learning. Children with special needs, be it physical or cognitive, often require different materials to aide their education. Many schools strive for the inclusion of special educational needs students within the classroom and now, with the help of technology, schools begin to close the gap and give children with disabilities equal opportunities to learn and communicate.

There have been many video games created within the past decades that specifically target special needs children, Dreamware being one. The device uses visual, auditory, temperature, and vibration sensory integration training which have been proven to capture the child's attention, keeping them focused for longer periods, allowing the child to learn more.

Other educational video games targeted towards those with special education needs include virtual reality, as it can provide knowledge building experiences. One study conducted by Professor Standen of University of Nottingham concluded that adolescent students with severe intellectual disabilities who practiced shopping in a virtual supermarket were both quicker and more precise than those who had not. This showed that students could acquire important life skills through a video game and could then transfer that knowledge into the real environment, making them a valuable tool in education.

== Importance to learners ==
Educational video games help learners in the development of reading comprehension and cognitive skills. For teachers, video games with educational value act as relevant material for engaging their students. Therefore, video games can be used as an immersive learning system that provides for a combination of digital technology, rich narrative, and real world gameplay. Through games students learn to exercise resilience, critical thinking, and problem solving skills by identifying numerous solutions for problems. By introducing them to educational video games, parents and teachers can make children interested in technology and technical skills from an early age.

Educational video games are important for individualized learning. Given that every learner is different, teachers are always looking for adequate resources that will provide every learner with an individualized learning plan. Video games allow students to learn new concepts at their own pace without having a constant overlook from parents and teachers (Chang et al., 2009). The experiences of the players can be tailored based on their preferences and performance. The game is automatically adjusted to present higher-level challenges after solving each problem. If they are having difficulty with a concept, then the game is tailored to present the same concept in a different manner until the student understands it. Video games balance enjoyment with an appropriate challenge level, which keeps players in an optimally engaging and challenging learning zone.

Research shows that children who play educational video games have improved visual-spatial skills. For instance, a simple game session can help learners visualize science topics in a way that helps them learn better. Children who play educational video games have sharpened visual attention skills and improved capacity to visualize 3D objects (Achtman et al. 2008). Furthermore, educational video games as they improve their aim and hand-eye coordination. The video game is a learning sector as activities that sharpen the perceptions of children as well as their responses to the world.

Activity-promoting games are games that focus on increasing physical activity. For students, specifically, there are several benefits to using these in an educational setting. When it comes to active video games, it is almost like another step is added to further the value of using them. In comparison to the traditional classroom setting, one study found that students who played an educational game that forced a certain extent of physical activity felt an increase in the amount of attention needed. This is important when it comes to situational awareness as students are able to be more in tune with their surroundings, which can lead to an increase in motivation.

However, one important thing to note with active video games is that they are just as effective as other educational games that do not have the physical activity component. Test results from the study did not seem to show a difference between the two. Nevertheless, active video games allow students to improve their learning while also being active in a setting where they get little activity.

Implementation of gaming into a classroom curriculum can be helpful with attention capture of students. Stimulating activities such as gaming, pique the interest of students and provide a modern approach to comprehension.

== Limitations ==
One of the major limitations of educational video games is that they leave little room for spontaneous play. A child may be involved and have some degree of control in a game but ultimately cannot control the direction in which the game will go, hindering the notion of self-directed play as a means for learning. It has been noted that educational video games can help students focus; however, once the game has ended many find it hard to adapt back to the slower pace of receiving information in the classroom.

It is also important for students to be able to ask questions on topics they do not fully understand. A supervising teacher may be able to aid the student whereas the computer cannot provide answers to all questions posed. Using educational computer games also relies on the teacher having prior knowledge of how the game works and be somewhat computer literate.

Regardless of the enthusiasm surrounding video games and learning, very few studies have come to a conclusive answer as to whether educational video games improve academic achievement and classroom performance. Although individuals may develop game-specific abilities; these may not transfer into traditional academic skills required for learning. Only additional research could tell whether playing educational video games improves classroom behavior and academic skills.

== See also ==
- Educational software
- Explorable explanation
- Games and learning
- GoVenture Educational Games and Simulations
- List of educational video games
- Serious game
- Video game controversies
- Video game behavioral effects
