= Affinity space =

Place of shared learning

An affinity space is a place where learning happens. According to James Paul Gee, affinity spaces are locations where groups of people are drawn together because of a shared, strong interest or engagement in a common activity. Often but not always occurring online, affinity spaces encourage the sharing of knowledge or participation in a specific area, and informal learning is a common outcome. In his coining of the term, Gee takes the notion of participatory cultures, and reframes it to the idea of "space". To Gee, what is happening in these online cultures is not merely a "culture" – and far different from a "community". In Gee's view, the word "community" conjures up images of belongingness and membership (p. 70). Instead, he has defined these worlds as "spaces" – a term that allows for the "robust characterization of the ebbs and flows and differing levels of involvement and participation exhibited by members"

According to Gee (2004), "An affinity space is a place or set of places where people affiliate with others based primarily on shared activities, interests, and goals, not shared race, class culture, ethnicity, or gender" (p. 67).

Gee (2004) refers to affinity spaces and states, "Learners 'apprentice' themselves to a group of people who share a certain set of practices (e.g. learning to cook in a family, learning to play video games with a guild, learning to assemble circuit boards in a workplace, learning to splice genes in a biology lab), pick up these practices through joint action with more advanced peers, and advance their abilities to engage and work with others in carrying out such practices" (p. 70).

What Gee (2004) tries to explain about Affinity Spaces is not an attempt to label a group of people. By affinity space, he means a space where people can interact and share a lot with each other. The people who are interacting in a space might find themselves as sharing a community with some others in that space, while other people might view their interactions in the space differently. Gee (2004) adds, " In any case, creating spaces within diverse sorts of people can interact is a leitmotif of the modern world" (p. 71).

== Hallmarks of Affinity Spaces ==
Gee described twelve hallmarks of what he terms "nurturing" affinity spaces:

1. The affinity in these spaces is to the endeavor, not other people. People from all ages, ethnicities, educational levels, and cultures play/create together – often anonymously or using alter-identities.
2. Not segregated by age; there is no assumption that older or more senior participants are the only ones with something to teach.
3. Not segregated by experience; newbies, masters, and everyone else share a common space.
4. Everyone can, if they so wish, produce and not just consume. The idea that creation can come not only from a space's designers, but also from its users, is a hallmark of these spaces. Users – not just site designers – can help create, shape, and reshape the site and its content. Suggestions are welcome and encouraged, and site designers often use the suggestions of users to reform site designs and configurations.
5. Content within the space is not fixed, but is transformed by interaction.
6. Both intensive and extensive knowledge are encouraged. Extensive knowledge is seen as broad, less specialized knowledge about many aspects of the space. Intensive knowledge is in-depth knowledge about certain aspects of the space.
7. Individual and distributed knowledge are valued.
8. Dispersed knowledge is encouraged.
9. Tacit knowledge is encouraged and honored. Members do not have to lead or design; those who wish to “just play” are valued as much as those who wish to contribute more substantially to the site.
10. Many forms and routes to participation are available.
11. Different routes to status are inherent in the game.
12. Leadership is porous and leaders are resources.

== Educational uses ==
Because members of an affinity space are interested in a common practice/belief/activity, they have common ground and motivation together. Gee says that because of this common interest, affinity spaces are able to bridge barriers of age, race, socio-economic status, and educational level, and thus allow each user to participate as he/she chooses, and both experts and novices are equally legitimate participants in the affinity space While not everyone in affinity spaces is an expert, they are not places where the "blind are leading the blind." Many spaces have unwritten rules that while sharing information, you must share only what you know, provide sources to back up what you say, and in general, leave feedback and comments only in areas you know.

== Examples ==
Online fan fiction sites are examples of affinity spaces. While the goal of the sites is usually to share and read other people's fan fiction creations, informal learning takes place as people have their work read and commented on by "'beta readers.'" It is up to the author then to decide what to do with this informal feedback; often, it is used to revise and edit the work, and at the same time, it may aid the author in pinpointing his or her own overall writing flaws.

Other examples come from "snark sites" or "rant communities." The goal of these sites is typically to make fun of particular problems, such as poorly written fan fiction, or digital image editing mistakes. As community members criticize other people's work, they reach new levels of sophistication in their evaluations, creating extended vocabularies of terms and categorizing mistakes. In Benjamin Bloom's taxonomy, evaluation is at the top of higher order thinking skills. Since either authors or their friends and fans are likely to come to the defense of works being criticized, rhetoric and logic are two areas where much active learning takes place.

== Notes ==
- Bensen, S. "I don't know if that'd be English or not": Third space theory and literacy instruction. In "Journal of Adolescent and Adult Literacy", 53 (7), (pp. 555–563).
- Gee, James Paul. Situated Language and Learning: A Critique of Traditional Schooling. New York: Routledge, 2004. ISBN 0-415-31777-0, ISBN 0-415-31776-2.
- Gee, James Paul Semiotic Social Spaces and Affinity Spaces: From The Age of Mythology to Today's Schools. In D. Barton & K. Tusting (Eds.), Beyond communities of practice: Language, power and social context (pp. 214–232). Cambridge: Cambridge University Press, 2005.
- Gee, James Paul & Elisabeth Hayes. Public Pedagogy through Video Games: Design, Resources & Affinity Spaces. Game Based Learning. Retrieved from https://web.archive.org/web/20100820191022/http://www.gamebasedlearning.org.uk/content/view/59. 2009.
- Jenkins, Henry. Convergence Culture: Where Old and New Media Collide. New York: New York University Press, 2006. ISBN 0-8147-4281-5.
