= GoVenture Educational Games and Simulations =

Educational media brand

- Developers: MediaSpark Inc.
- Publishers: MediaSpark Inc.
- Designer: Mathew Georghiou
- First Release: 2000
- Operating System: Microsoft Windows, Macintosh, Online
- Licence: Proprietary
- Genre: Educational Simulations

GoVenture is the brand name for a series of educational computer games and simulations developed and published by MediaSpark Inc. The first GoVenture simulation was launched in 2000 and several more have been launched since. GoVenture educational games and simulations are themed on business and money subjects and are designed to give learners realistic experiences with various business processes and financial topics.

== Reference Descriptions ==
- Preparing for Work: Resources for International Youth Livelihood Education, reviews the GoVenture IdeaBook and Lemonade Stand simulation. 2010.
- OSAPAC (Ontario Software Acquisition Program Advisory Committee) announces the purchase of four GoVenture simulations for all junior high schools and high schools in Ontario, Canada. 2010.
- IBM announcement of virtual event references Mathew Georghiou and MediaSpark, 12 October 2006.
- Cisco Entrepreneur Institute website references GoVenture games and simulations.
- National Educational Computing Conference exhibitor announcement 24 June 2009.
- CNET reviews of GoVenture software on 16 July 2010.
- International Association of Business Communicators (IABC) announces 2004 Silver Leaf Award for GoVenture Live The Learning newsletter.
- PC Magazine's review of GoVenture simulations, 3 October 2000.
- CP24 (Canadian Online news channel) airs Citytv segment of Mathew Georghiou demonstrating GoVenture simulations, 26 May 2004. Video segment can be viewed on MediaSpark's website.
- Macromedia eLearning Innovation Award 2000 – announcement.
- Consortium for Entrepreneurship Education – List of approved classroom materials includes reference to GoVenture simulations by MediaSpark.
- University of Western Ontario overview of Stock Market Challenges and Financial Competitions for the Classroom references GoVenture simulations.
- Government of Nova Scotia press release announces availability of GoVenture software, 29 November 1999.
- Serious Games Source Developer Showcase Q&A with MediaSpark.
- Gamasutra reference to SGS Developers Showcase: MediaSpark, 6 December 2006.

== See also ==
- List of educational video games
