= What Video Games Have to Teach Us About Learning and Literacy =

2003 book by James Paul Gee

What Video Games Have to Teach Us About Learning and Literacy.
- First edition
- Author: James Paul Gee
- Language: English
- Subject: Education and Gaming
- Publisher: Palgrave Macmillan
- Publication date: May 16, 2003
- Publication place: United States
- Media type: Print (Hardcover and Paperback) and audio-CD
- Pages: 256
- ISBN: 978-1403984531

What Video Games Have to Teach Us About Learning and Literacy is a book by James Paul Gee that focuses on the learning principles in video games and how these principles can be applied to the K-12 classroom. Video games can be used as tools to challenge players, when they are successful. They motivate players to persevere and simultaneously teach players how to play the game. These games give a glimpse into how one might create new and more powerful ways to learn in schools, communities, and workplaces. Gee began his work in video games by identifying thirty-six learning principles that are present in—but not exclusive to—the design of good video games. He further argues for the application of these principles into the classroom environment. What Video Games Teach Us about Learning and Literacy is a call to educators, teachers, parents and administrators to change the approach to pedagogy.

== Summary ==
Gee began playing video games when his (then) six-year-old son needed help playing the problem-solving game Pajama Sam. When he discovered how much enjoyment his son had and how much attention and time he spent solving the game's problems, Gee decided to start playing video games on his own and began to analyze what makes people spend time and money on video games. To his amazement, good video games were "hard, long, and complex", and he often had to use outside resources to learn things needed to complete the game. However, when a game is too easy and/or too short, players do not feel compelled by it and they simply will not continue playing it. The new challenges, learning potential, and consistent struggles of these games also make video games motivating and entertaining for the user.

Gee takes a personal approach to explaining how the immersive, interactive world of a video game engages the player in ways that formal education may fall short. He argues that players do not usually read the manual before playing a game—they play the game and then look at the manual. He suggests that, in essence, this is what is required of students when they are asked to read a textbook before the information is put in context—before they get to play 'the game.' Gee takes an optimistic view of video games, gathering a list of learning principles commonly found in these games. He challenges the assumption that video games are a waste of time and points to ways in which, when played in an environment that fosters critical thinking, video games can become excellent teaching tools. He also points out that games are not easy and that it is precisely their challenging nature that keeps the player involved. Gee suggests that if students in formal educational environments had the ability to build their own knowledge, as players in a game do when they beat a level, more progressive learning would follow rather than the frustration that is often felt by students in academic settings.

Some of the learning principles that good games incorporate include: identity development, interactive approaches, student production, risk-taking, individual customization, personal agency, well-ordered problems, challenges and consolidation, "just-in-time" and "on demand", situated meanings, systems thinking, active exploration, thinking laterally, rethinking goals, using smart tools and distributed knowledge, engaging in cross-functional teams, and encouraging performance before competence.

== Learning principles ==
=== Learning and semiotic domains ===
- Active, Critical Learning Principle: Every aspect of the learning environment should be set up to encourage active and critical learning, instead of more traditionally passive learning environments. Active learning requires the learner to understand and use design grammars of the semiotic domain in which he/she is learning. Critical learning has occurred when the learner can engage with, reflect upon, critique, and change elements of the design.
- Design Principle: Learning about design principles and appreciating the design.
- Semiotic Principle: Identifying, understanding, and appreciating the relationships across symbol systems. Symbols may include words, images, actions, artifacts, etc.
- Semiotic Domains Principle: Mastery in a semiotic domain so that one can participate in the appropriate community of practice. A semiotic domain uses a given modality (images, equations, symbols, etc.) to communicate messages to others. Examples of semiotic domains include cognitive psychology, first-person shooter games, and cellular biology.
- Meta-Level Thinking about Semiotic Domains Principle: Learners can critically think about the relationships between multiple semiotic domains. For example, how do the concepts found in Cognitive Psychology relate to First Person Shooter Games?

=== Learning and identity ===
- "Psychosocial Moratorium" Principle: The real-world consequences do not exist, allowing learners to take greater risks. For example, in gaming worlds learners are able to "try-out" different identities relating to gender, ethnicity, and even species. Similarly, gaming environments allows learners to make multiple attempts towards a given reward (i.e. new level, boss) without any real-world consequences. This creates a safe space for the learner to fully engage with the environment.
- Committed Learning Principle: Learners will participate in extended engagements as an extension of their real-world identities in relation to their virtual identities. The learner feels a commitment to continue their effort and practice.
- Identity Principle: The learner is able to choose multiple identities in such a way that they can reflect upon "new" and "old" identities. Gee specifically identifies that learners have a real-world identity, a virtual identity, and a projective identity.
- Self-Knowledge Principle: The learner learns about themselves and their potential range of skills, in a self-reflective process.
- Amplification of Input Principle: The learner is able to put in a small input, but receives a much larger output. This principle examines how much effort is needed by the learner to receive some reward.
- Achievement Principle: The learner needs intrinsic rewards that are tailored to that learner's level, effort, and mastery of the content.

=== Situated meaning and learning ===
- Practice Principle: Learners need a great deal of practice in a context where they are engaged with the material, not bored with it.
- Ongoing Learning Principle: The learner will go through cycles of learning new material, automatizating the material, undoing some automatization, and reorganizing the automatization.
- "Regime of Competence" Principle: The learner can function at the outer edge of his/her understanding to make concepts feel challenging, but not impossible.
- Probing Principle: We learn by engaging with the world, reflecting on our actions, forming hypotheses, re-probing the world, and then accepting or rethinking these hypotheses.
- Multiple Routes Principle: Learners are given a range of paths to pursue forward, in which the learner can choose based on his/her strengths, weaknesses, and specific learning styles.
- Situated Meaning Principle: All of the meanings of signs are situated in embodied experiences of the learner.
- Text Principle: Texts are not just understood by understanding the words in the text, but by understanding the texts through experience.
- Intertextual Principle: Learners understand connections between texts by understanding, through experience, the meaning of some texts and relating that meaning to other related texts.
- Multimodal Principle: Meaning is learned through multiple modalities besides words (e.g., sounds, images).
- "Material Intelligence" Principle: Tools, technologies, material objects, and the environment hold information that a learner can access through interaction.
- Intuitive Knowledge Principle: Knowledge that cannot necessarily be verbalized, such as the knowledge gained through practicing a task, is valuable.

=== Transfer of knowledge ===
- Subset Principle: Learning first occurs in a simplified subset of the real domain.
- Incremental Principle: Learners create connections in earlier, easier stages that aid them in later, more difficult stages.
- Concentrated Sample Principle: The learner gains experience with fundamental concepts/actions early on so that s/he can learn them well.
- Bottom-Up Basic Skills Principle: Basic skills are learned in context.
- Explicit Information On-Demand and Just-In-Time Principle: Information is provided at crucial times to maximize proper responses.
- Discovery Principle: The learner is told very little explicitly, and is instead allowed to explore and discover on his/her own.
- Transfer Principle: Learners are given the opportunity to apply learning from earlier stages to later stages.

=== Cultural models ===
- Cultural Models About the World Principle: Learners can reflect on their cultural models in a manner "outside" their real world identities.
- Cultural Models About Learning Principle: Learners can reflect on their cultural models regarding learning and themselves as learners in a manner "outside" their real world identities.
- Cultural Models About Semiotic Domains Principle: Learners can reflect on their cultural models regarding particular domains they are learning about in a manner "outside" their real world identities.

=== Learning as a social activity ===
- Distributed Principle: Texts, tools, people, and technology are networked so that information is distributed among them.
- Dispersed Principle: The learner shares knowledge with others who s/he may never meet face to face.
- Affinity Group Principle: Learners form groups with shared identities, goals, and practices rather than by race, gender, or nationality.
- Insider Principle: The learner contributes to the game and is not just a passive consumer.

== Critical reception ==
Gee's book was generally well received by critics as an ambitious project that was "thoughtful, unique, and impassioned." However, Gee does not escape criticism. Primarily, he was criticized for his failure to recognize other scholars working in similar fields of gaming theory, specifically Janet Murray's theories about agency and identity in games and Thomas Malone's scholarship on motivation. Gee has also been criticized for relying too much on his personal experiences as empirical evidence and for romanticizing the games he discusses.

== Application of theory ==
The James Paul Gee Learning Games Awards were created in 2020 to apply Gee's theories to the identification and judging of learning game design.

Gee's book is used in Kimon Keramidas' argument explaining the learning processes of gamers. Some of the schema and elements that are used in game designing can be analogously used as "frameworks for reconsidering the structures of classroom experiences, syllabi, and program development. "What we are learning from games (both creating and playing) can be used by teachers to enhance their teaching and better prepare students for technology-based society". Keramidas considers six game features (Jesper Juul's definition): rules, variable-quantifiable outcome, values assigned to possible outcomes, player effort, player attached to outcome, and negotiable consequences to compare games with learning systems. Rules (a key component of any games) are very important in creating a good learning environment. The outcomes that a player achieves while playing a game are what makes playing games compelling and interesting; outcomes in education (both grades, and amount of knowledge that student will gain as a result of learning) are effective, only if the syllabi and curricula are compelling to learners and the assignments that are used to measure students' learning motivate students. Students will learn when they put effort and time into their studies, and they will be engaged in their learning if they believe that the possible outcome is worth their work and effort. What student experience and learn in school cannot (and should not) be separated from real life, and students should be encouraged to understand that gaining knowledge is comparable with gaining rewards in games (negotiable consequences—player is not mandated by the game rules in the real world but the consequences of gaming "may spill over" into the player's life).

Katie Salen promotes games as a learning tool for the 21st century. She helped design and launch Quest to Learn where learning takes place by playing and exploring games. The curriculum is organized around the idea that "digital games are central to the lives of today's children and also increasingly, as their speed and capabilities grow, powerful tools for intellectual exploration." Gee's ideas also form the basis of the work described in Matthew Barr's Graduate Skills and Game-Based Learning, where the author presents empirical evidence to support Gee's theories on game-based learning.

== Editions ==
- Gee, James Paul. 2003. What video games have to teach us about learning and literacy. New York: Palgrave Macmillan.
- Gee, James Paul. 2007. What video games have to teach us about learning and literacy. Revised and Updated Edition. New York [etc.]: Palgrave Macmillan.

== See also ==
- Educational game
