= Michele Knobel =

Educationalist (1966–2021)

Michele Knobel (21 March 1966 – 15 October 2021) was a Professor of Education in the Department of Teaching and Learning at Montclair State University and an internationally recognized researcher and scholar in the area of literacy education, new literacies and digital technologies.

== Biography ==
Knobel was born in Moree, Australia. She started her teaching career in 1986 working as a classroom teacher in grades 3 to 5 at Good Shepherd Lutheran Primary School in Noosa, Australia. After that, she started working as a lecturer in Literacy Education in three different Australian Universities: University of Southern Queensland, Toowoomba (1990–1992); Queensland University of Technology, Brisbane (1993, 1996–1998); Australian Catholic University, McAuley Campus, Mitchelton (1994–1995). Since 1999 she has been working as an Adjunct Associate Professor in Central Queensland University in Rockhampton, Australia. In the meantime she went to the National Autonomous University of Mexico as a Visiting Researcher, from 1999 to 2001, and in 2002 she worked as an Assistant Professor and Associate Research Specialist in the Department of Education of the University of California. Knobel joined Montclair State University in 2003, where she worked as a professor in the Department of Early Childhood, Elementary and Literacy Education until her death in Glen Ridge, New Jersey in October 2021.

== Academic Work ==
Knobel's early work focused on the everyday literacies of adolescents within school and out-of-school settings (Knobel 1998). During the past decade her work has increasingly focused on the nature and conduct of teacher research and, particularly, the emergence and take up of new literacies and their implications for literacy education and teacher education. Nowadays, her research interests focus principally on young people's literacy practices, and the study of the relationship between new literacies and digital technologies. She has published a number of books, including "Everyday Literacies: Students, Discourse and Social Practice", which documents four adolescents' in school and out of school literacy practices. She has also co-written a number of books in English and Spanish with Colin Lankshear. In Brazil, Knobel's work has influenced many literacy researchers, amongst which is Ana Paula Duboc, Patrícia da Silva Campelo Costa, Eliseo Berni Reategui and Daniel Mello Ferraz.

== Research & Publications ==
- "Everyday Literacies: Students, Discourse and Social Practice"
- “New Literacies: Everyday Practices and Social Learning", 3rd edition (2011; previous editions translated into Spanish and Catalan);
- "Literacies: Social, Cultural and Historical Perspectives" (2011);
- "DIY Media: Sharing, Creating and Learning with New Media." (2010);
- "The Handbook of Research on New Literacies" (2008, co-edited with Julie Coiro, Colin Lankshear and Don Leu);
- "Handbook for Teacher Research" (2004, also translated into Portuguese and Chinese).
