= Management and Economic Simulation Exercise =

Educational simulation software

JA Titan
- Stable release: 4.1
- Available in: English
- Type: Educational
- Website: jausa.ja.org/programs/ja-titan

Management and Economic Simulation Exercise (MESE), also known as JA Titan, is a computer simulation program developed by Junior Achievement. The program is designed to help students develop skills such as decision-making and teamwork.

During the simulation, students act as corporate managers of their own companies that produce an imaginary product called Eco-Pen. The students use data such as simulated financial reports and market research to make decisions on product development, pricing, and production. At the end of the simulation, the most successful team is the one that has the highest profit and market share.

The program is used for the annual seven-month-long Hewlett-Packard Global Business Challenge, run globally over the Internet. During the competition, Junior Achievement students and alumni between the ages of 14 and 22 make team decisions and are scored based on profit and market share.
