= Kurt Squire =

American journalist

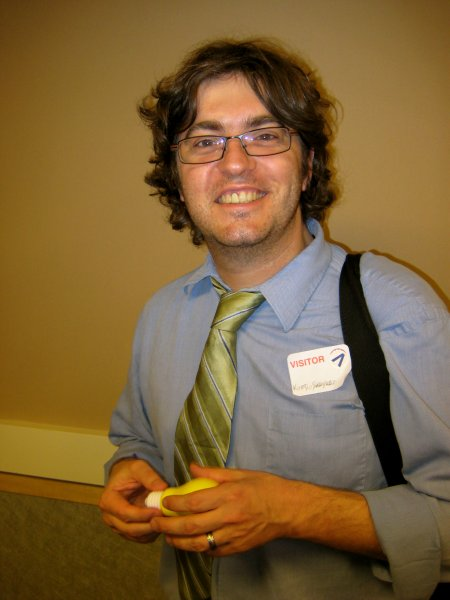
- Born: Kurt Squire
- Education: Indiana University Bloomington
- Known for: Game-based learning
- Spouse: Constance Steinkuehler (m. 2006)
- Children: 2
- Scientific career
- Fields: Education; Game-based learning
- Workplaces: University of California, Irvine
- Academic advisors: Henry Jenkins

Kurt D. Squire (born July 10, 1972, in Valparaiso, Indiana) is a professor at The University of California, Irvine, member of the Connected Learning Laboratory, and former director of the Games, Learning & Society Initiative at the University of Wisconsin–Madison, best known for his research into game design for education.

== Biography ==
Squire was born as the elder of two children to Walter "Dean" Squire, an accountant, and Susan Elizabeth Nelson, a German language teacher. He attended Portage High School, graduating in 1990, then going on to study at the Western College Program at Miami University.

In 2006, Squire married Constance Steinkuehler, also a video game scholar and professor at the University of California, Irvine. They have two children.

== Education/teaching career ==
He received a B.Phil. in interdisciplinary studies in 1994 from Miami University, and earned a Ph.D. in education in 2004 from Indiana University Bloomington. He taught at the Knoxville Montessori School and the McGuffey Foundation School between 1994 and 1996; later he became research manager of the Games-to-Teach Project at Massachusetts Institute of Technology.

Squire is the recipient of an National Science Foundation (NSF) CAREER grant, as well as grant support from the NSF, National Institutes of Healthy, Department of Education, the MacArthur Foundation, AMD and Gates Foundations, as well as companies such as Microsoft, DeVry, and the Data Recognition Corporation. Squire wrote a regular column for Computer Games magazine, and has been interviewed for many periodicals and media outlets, from Public Broadcasting Service (PBS) to wired.com.
