= Entertainment in education =

Entertainment products have been used in a variety of ways in the field of education. They may be used to teach academic lessons or help students learn social skills.

== By setting ==
=== Elementary schools ===
Entering a classroom, whether one full of preschoolers or school age children, one has no doubt that educational toys are part of the modern educator's curriculum. From manipulative, to dress up, to board games, to musical instruments, to interactive electronic toys such as robots or turtle roamers, the breadth of educational toys is vast. While it is not uncommon to find computers in the modern elementary school classroom, it is not yet common to find children actively engaged in video games for educational development. As computers and video games assume an increasingly central role in daily life, their presence in educational toys and games will likewise expand, underscoring the fluid nature of what constitutes an "educational tool" as classroom integration evolves alongside shifting perceptions.

Plato, the Greek philosopher, says in Laws:

"I'm going to explain how one should describe education: It is this I insist that man who intends to be good at a particular occupation must practice it from childhood both at work and at play he must be surrounded by the 'special tools of the trade.'
We should learn to use the children's games to channel their pleasures and desires towards activities in which they have to engage when they are adult..."

=== Universities ===
Some college professors have adopted the practice of edutainment in order to keep the interest of adult students in long classroom lectures. Here the instructor entertains the students while meeting course objectives. An important teaching technique of education is to use variety, by utilizing various mediums such as video, in-class skits, demonstrations, and Power Point slides along with lectures. Within the lecture, the instructor can add interesting elements and discussions of personal experiences of the professor or students.
