= PlaceSpotting =

Map-based online video game

PlaceSpotting was an online game, based on Google Maps, developed by Swiss programmer Martin Fussen. Its server is based in Switzerland and has English- and German-language versions. In international Media, PlaceSpotting is recommended as a "challenging amusement" and an "educational way of wasting time on the internet".

== Overview ==
The way PlaceSpotting works is simple:

- To create a new quiz, move and zoom the map until it shows an interesting place. Provide some hints for the person who will try to solve it and a message one will see if the riddle is solved. After saving the quiz you can send it by mail to a friend or embed it in your homepage as a picture.
- If someone wants to solve the quiz their task is to find the place shown in your picture on a second google map. The site additionally has a blog to share questions or hints, a search function, and the possibility to rate quizzes.
- Players are scoring an approximate 11% success rate.
- In the first 30 months after going live approximately 3.3 Million quizzes were opened and 20,000 created.
- PlaceSpotting is free and can be played without registration. A registration is possible and allows to use special functions like "my quizeees" or "quizzes I solved"
- There are some Google Adwords on the page.

== Development ==
PlaceSpotting was developed for people who used email communication to send their friends screen shots of interesting places and wanted them to guess what place was shown in the picture.

== Different platforms ==
Two screens of the iPhone App.

Beside the web page PlaceSpotting can be played as a Facebook Application or as an iPhone App The iPhone Application was released 4 October 2009. A free version is planned. The application received the award App of the week in December 2009 in Switzerland.

== Community ==
PlaceSpotting is present on Facebook and StudiVZ and on YouTube is a short Video about how to play PlaceSpotting.

== See also ==
- Indoor positioning system

== Media coverage ==
- Story in German magazine, Heise online
- A story in the Swiss online magazine 20minuten.ch
- An article in the Swedish online newspaper Metropol
- An article on the page of Deutschlandradio
