= Persuasive writing =

Technique used to convince a reader

Persuasive writing is a form of written argument designed to persuade readers toward a specific point of view or opinion on a given topic. This writing style relies on arguments supported by evidence that substantiates the central thesis. Examples of persuasive writing include reviews, editorials, proposals, and advertisements, all of which employ various persuasive techniques to influence readers.

In formal and academic contexts, persuasive writing often requires a comprehensive understanding of both sides of the argument—the position in favor and the opposing viewpoint. Acknowledging the counterargument is a strategy in this type of writing. By distinguishing and minimizing the significance of opposing perspectives, the writer enhances the credibility and persuasiveness of their argument.

== Structure ==
Effective persuasive writing requires a clear and organized structure to present arguments convincingly. Common components of this structure are:

1. Introduction and thesis statement.
2. Body paragraphs, particularly providing evidence in favor of the thesis and addressing counterarguments.
3. Conclusion summarizing the essay while reinforcing the thesis statement.

== See also ==
- Rhetoric
- Propaganda
- Argument
- Logical fallacies
- Assertiveness
- Editorial
- Letter to the editor
- Manifesto
- Open letter
- Opinion journalism
- Opinion piece
