= Constance Steinkuehler =

American professor

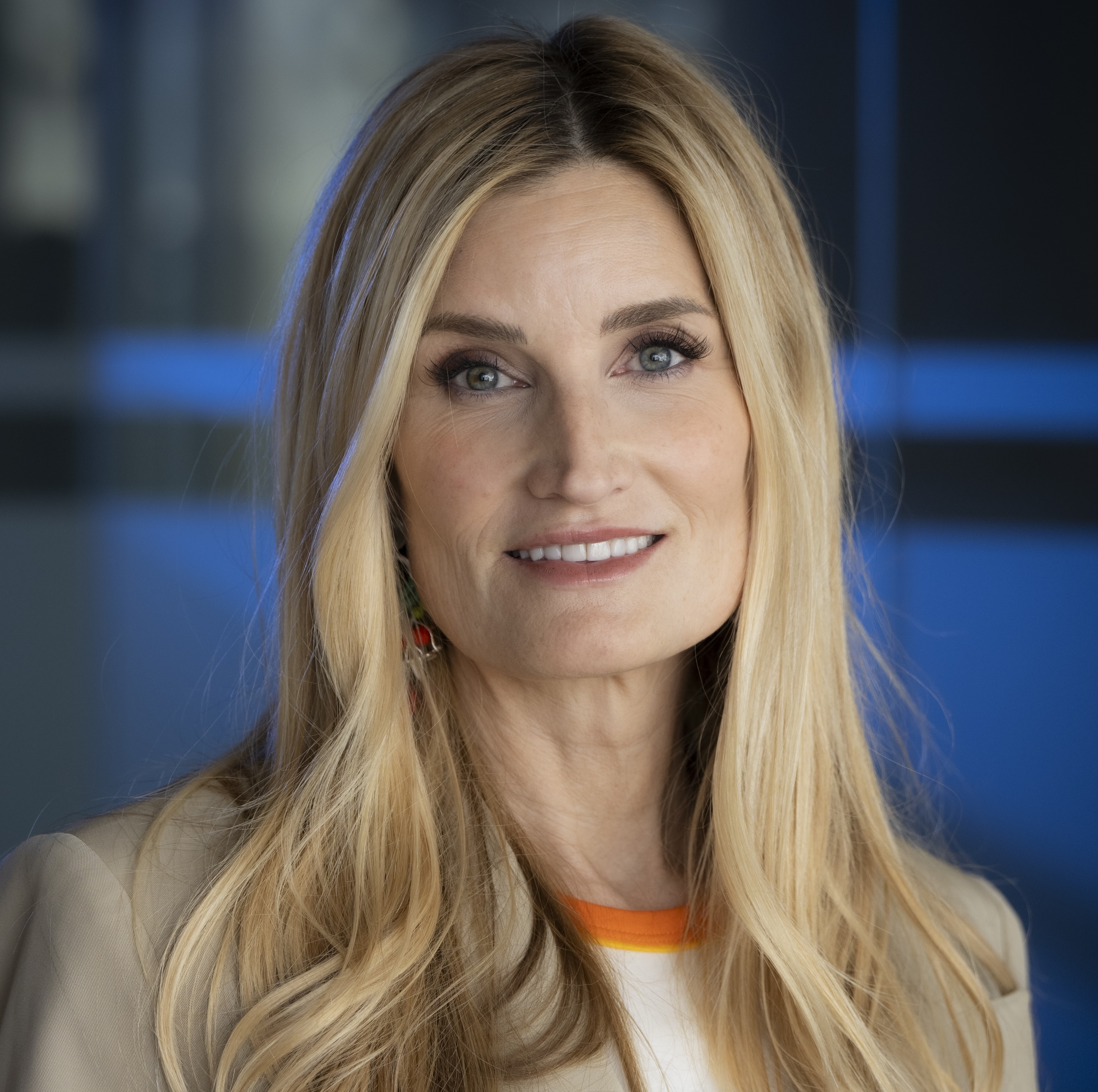
- Born: Constance Steinkuehler
- Education: University of Missouri, University of Wisconsin–Madison
- Known for: Game-based learning
- Spouse: Kurt Squire (m. 2006)
- Children: 2
- Scientific career
- Fields: Education; Game-based learning Literacy; Informatics
- Workplaces: University of California, Irvine; University of Wisconsin–Madison; Office of Science and Technology Policy
- Doctoral advisor: James Paul Gee

Constance Steinkuehler is an American professor of Informatics at the University of California, Irvine. She previously taught at the University of Wisconsin-Madison before taking public service leave, from 2011-2012, to work as a Senior Policy Analyst in the Office of Science and Technology Policy (OSTP) at the White House Executive Office, where she advised on policy matters about video games and digital media.

Steinkuehler studies cognition, culture, and learning in multiplayer online games. She is the co-director of the Games+Learning+Society Center at UC Irvine and teaches courses on games and society.

== Education ==
Steinkuehler earned bachelor's degrees in Mathematics, English, and Religious Studies from the University of Missouri in 1993. She completed an MS in Educational Psychology (Cognitive Science) in 2000 and a PhD in Curriculum and Instruction in 2005 at the University of Wisconsin–Madison. Her dissertation was a cognitive ethnography of Lineage and World of Warcraft.

== Professional career ==
=== Research ===
After earning her doctorate, Steinkuehler joined the faculty at University of Wisconsin as an Assistant Professor of Digital Media in the Department of Curriculum and Instruction.

From 2005 to 2013, her research team studied cognition and learning in online games, focusing on scientific reasoning, literacy, and problem-solving within game communities using mixed methods.

Between 2007 and 2009, she led an after-school gaming program for disengaged teens to explore the differences between learning in games and in school, including how adolescents read and engage with game-related versus academic texts.

After a period working in the Obama White House Office of Science and Technology, Steinkuehler returned to academic research with a new focus on field-building efforts. Research projects during this period (2012-2016) include collaborations with Dr. Richard Davidson through the Center for Investigating Healthy Minds on the design and testing of games for emotional acuity and self-regulation as well as cross-institutional efforts to situate big data (combining telemetry game data exhaust with conversational utterances across small groups of middle school game players) to better understand collaborative learning through game-based interventions.

In 2017, Steinkuehler and her partner Kurt Squire moved to the Department of Informatic at University of California, Irvine and re-established the Games+Learning+Society (GLS) Center as part of the trans-departmental Connected Learning Lab at UCI.

== Personal life ==
In 2006, Steinkuehler married Kurt Squire, former Creative Director at the Wisconsin Institutes for Discovery, and also a professor at University of California, Irvine. They have two children.

She appeared in a pilot TV show called Brain Trust. The show was piloted in 2008 and featured a team of thought leaders working collaboratively to solve seemingly unsolvable problems.
