= James Paul Gee =

American linguist

- Born: San Jose, California, U.S.
- Education: University of California at Santa Barbara (B.A.); Stanford University (M.A., Ph.D.)
- Occupation: University Professor
- Employer: Arizona State University
- Known for: Involvement in literacy research and New Literacy Studies; work with video games and learning
- Title: Mary Lou Fulton Presidential Professor of Literacy Studies

James Gee (/dʒiː/; born April 15, 1948) is a retired American researcher who has worked in psycholinguistics, discourse analysis, sociolinguistics, bilingual education, and literacy. Gee most recently held the position as the Mary Lou Fulton Presidential Professor of Literacy Studies at Arizona State University, originally appointed there in the Mary Lou Fulton Institute and Graduate School of Education. Gee has previously been a faculty affiliate of the Games, Learning, and Society group at the University of Wisconsin–Madison and is a member of the National Academy of Education.

== Biography ==
James Paul Gee was born in San Jose, California. He received his B.A. in philosophy from the University of California at Santa Barbara and both his M.A. and Ph.D. in linguistics from Stanford University. He started his career in theoretical linguistics, working in syntactic and semantic theory, and taught initially at Stanford University and later in the School of Language and Communication at Hampshire College in Amherst, Massachusetts. After doing some research in psycholinguistics at Northeastern University in Boston and at the Max Planck Institute for Psycholinguistics in the Netherlands, Prof. Gee's research focus switched to studies on discourse analysis, sociolinguistics, and applications of linguistics to literacy and education. He went on to teach in the School of Education at Boston University, where he was the chair of the Department of Developmental Studies and Counseling, and later in the Linguistics Department at the University of Southern California. At Boston University he established new graduate programs centered around an integrated approach to language and literacy, combining programs in reading, writing, bilingual education, ESL, and applied linguistics. From 1993 to 1997 he held the Jacob Hiatt Chair in Education in the Hiatt Center for Urban Education at Clark University in Massachusetts. From 1997 until 2007, he held the Tashia Morgridge Professor of Reading at the University of Wisconsin–Madison. In 2007, Gee relocated to Arizona State University, where he was the Mary Lou Fulton Presidential Professor of Literacy Studies in the Department of Curriculum and Instruction.

In 2019, Gee retired.

== Discourse/discourse ==
In his work in social linguistics, Gee explored the concept of Discourse ("big D" Discourse). In Gee's work, discourse ("little d") refers to language-in-use. When discussing the combination of language with other social practices (behavior, values, ways of thinking, clothes, food, customs, perspectives) within a specific group, Gee refers to that as Discourse. Individuals may be part of many different Discourse communities, for example “when you ‘pull-off’ being a culturally specific sort of ‘everyday’ person, a ‘regular’ at the local bar...a teacher or a student of a certain sort, or any of a great many other ‘ways of being in the world’” (p. 7).

=== Discourse communities ===
Furthermore, being able to function within a Discourse may carry advantages in different situations. For example, if a person is raised in a family of lawyers, the Discourses of politics or business may come very easily to that person. In the United States, those are all Discourses of power and they are closely related. Another person raised in a very different Discourse community might find himself or herself at a disadvantage when trying to move within the Discourse of business, trying to get a loan, for instance. One Discourse community is not inherently better than another; however, power within a society may be unequally represented within different Discourses.

=== Situated language ===
In Gee's view, language is always used from a perspective and always occurs within a context. There is no 'neutral' use of language. Meaning is socially constructed within Discourse communities.

== Discourse analysis ==
Gee's 1999 text An Introduction to Discourse Analysis: Theory and Method is a foundational work in the field of discourse analysis.

== New literacies ==
According to Gee, there are at least two reasons why we should consider literacy in broader terms than the traditional conception of literacy as the ability to read and write. First, in our world today, language is by no means the only communication system available. Many types of visual images and symbols have specific significances, and so “visual literacies” and literacies of other modes, or the concept of multimodal literacy, are also included in Gee's conception of new literacies. Second, Gee proposes that reading and writing (the ‘meat’ of literacy according to the traditional notion of the term) are not such obvious ideas as they first appear. “After all,” he states, “we never just read or write; rather, we always read or write something in some way”. In other words, according to which type of text we read there are different ways in which we read depending on the “rules” of how to read such a text. Literacy to Gee, even if it is the traditional print-based literacy, should be conceived as being multiple, or comprising different literacies, since we need different types of literacies to read different kinds of texts in ways that meet our particular purposes in reading them.

Furthermore, Gee also argues that reading and writing should be viewed as more than just “mental achievements” happening inside people's minds; they should also be seen as “social and cultural practices with economic, historical, and political implications”. So, in Gee's view, literacies are not only multiple but are inherently connected to social practices. In order to expand the traditional view of literacy as print literacy, Gee recommends that we think first of literacy in terms of semiotic domains. By this, he means “any set of practices that recruits one or more modalities (e.g., oral or written language, images, equations, symbols, sounds, gestures, graphs, artifacts, etc.) to communicate distinctive types of meanings”. There is a seemingly endless and varied range of semiotic domains, including (but certainly not limited to) cellular biology, first-person-shooter video games, rap music, or modernist painting. Most pundits would describe this conception of literacies as a key element in what has come to be known as the New Literacy Studies. In short, this theoretical and methodological orientation emphasizes studying language-in-use and literacies within their contexts of social practice. It includes work by colleagues such as Brian Street, Gunther Kress, David Barton, Mary Hamilton, Courtney Cazden, Ron Scollon, and Suzie Scollon, among others.

Gee's current work in the field of new literacies has seen him shift in his research focus somewhat from studying language-in-use to examining the D/iscourses of a range of new social practices—with a particular emphasis on video games and learning. Gee applies many key concepts from his previous research to studying video games. For example, Gee continues to argue that if we take reading to mean gaining understanding (instead of simply decoding letter sounds and words), one needs to be able to recognize or produce meanings inherent to any one semiotic domain in order to be literate in that domain. As such, and as Gee sets out in his text What Video Games Have to Teach Us About Learning and Literacy, one can be literate in the semiotic domain of video games if he or she “can recognize (the equivalent of “reading”) and/or produce (the equivalent of “writing”) meanings” in the video game domain. Therefore, because new literacies are multiple and attached to social and cultural practices, Gee explains that people need to (1) be literate in many different semiotic domains, and (2) be able to become literate in other *new* semiotic domains throughout their lives. This theoretical orientation aligns with work in the broad field of "new literacies" research—by colleagues such as Colin Lankshear, Michele Knobel, Henry Jenkins, Kevin Leander, Rebecca Black, Kurt Squire, and Constance Steinkuehler, among others.

== Games ==
More recently, Gee's work has focused on the learning principles in video games and how these learning principles can be applied to the K-12 classroom. Video games, when they are successful, are very good at challenging players. They motivate players to persevere and simultaneously teach players how to play. Gee began his work in video games by identifying thirty-six learning principles that are present in - but not exclusive to - the design of good video games. Gee argues for the application of these principles in the classroom. Gee's video game learning theory includes his identification of twelve basic learning principles. He identifies these as: 1)Active Control, 2) Design Principle, 3) Semiotic Principle, 4) Semiotic Domain, 5) Meta-level Thinking, 6) Psychosocial Moratorium Principle, 7) Committed Learning Principle 8) Identity Principle, 9) Self-knowledge Principle, 10) Amplification of Input Principle, 11) Achievement Principle, 12) Practice Principle, 13) Ongoing Learning Principle, 14) Regime of Competence Principle.

=== Good learning principles in video games ===
Gee condenses and clusters these principles even more closely in an article following the publication of his video games and learning book. Gee believes good education involves “applying the fruitful principles of learning that good game designers have hit on, whether or not we use a game as a carrier of these principles" (p. 6). Thus, Gee organizes the condensed list of good learning principles in three student-centered, classroom-friendly clusters: “Empowered Learners; Problem Solving; Understanding" (p. 6).

Under Empowered Learners, Gee includes the learning principles of “co-design,” “customize,” “identity,” and “manipulation and distributed knowledge.” These principles incorporate the idea that an engaged student is active in designing and customizing their own learning experience, can learn by taking on new identities (e.g. in explore career paths or specialized skill sets in simulated roles), and feels “more expanded and empowered when they can manipulate powerful tools in intricate ways that extend their area of effectiveness" (p. 8).

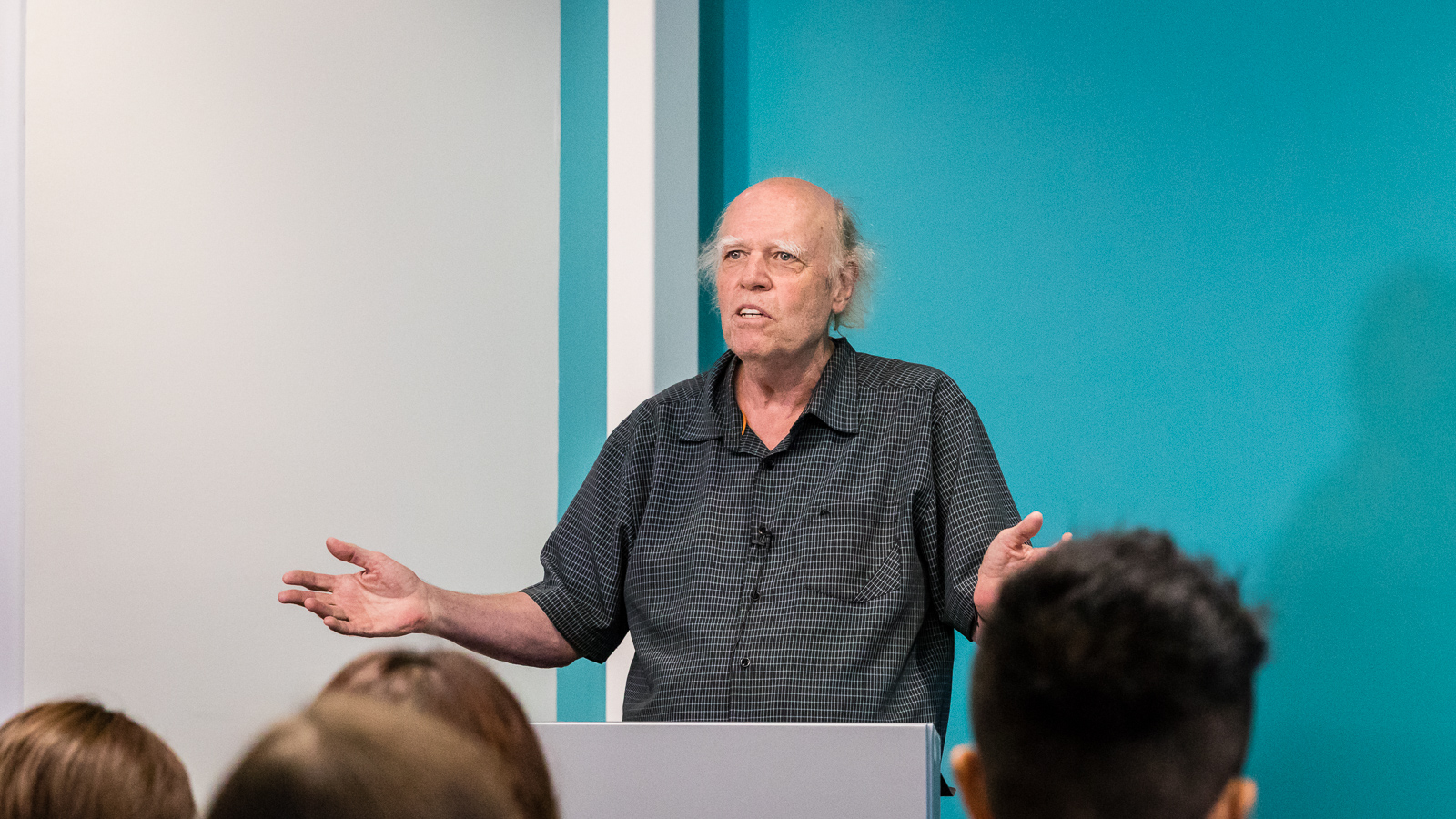
James Paul Gee at the Mary Lou Fulton Teachers College in 2018

The Problem Solving category includes the learning principles of “well-ordered problems,” “pleasantly frustrating,” “cycles of expertise,” “information ‘on demand’ and ‘just in time,’” “fish tanks,” “sandboxes,” and “skills as strategies.” In these first three principles, Gee argues, the scaffolding and ordering of problems learners face is key in keeping them right at their Zone of Proximal Development in different levels of skill-building. For each of these levels, Gee specifies key elements (present in the latter four learning principles): carefully prioritized information, relevant and applicable facts, and a set of related skills with which to construct strategies in a safe and authentic context.

In Gee's cluster of Understanding principles, he includes “system thinking,” and “meaning as action image.” In “system thinking”, students have an overview of their learning context as a distinct system with its own naturally reinforced set of behaviors and embedded values. Here, the meanings of words and concepts become clear – not through “lectures, talking heads, or generalities" (p. 14) – but through the experiences the players/students have (“meaning as action image”).

Gee's other principles as found on page 64 of his 2007 book, What Video Games have to Teach us about Learning and Literacy, are: "Psychosocial Moratorium" principle, Committed Learning Principle, Identity Principle, Self-Knowledge Principle, Amplification of Input Principle, and Achievement Principle. Additionally, in the book on page 68, Gee further lists the Practice Principle, Ongoing Learning Principle, and the "Regime of Competence" Principle.

== Identity theory ==
James Gee defines identity as: “Being recognized as a certain ‘kind of person,’ in a given context...” (p.99). Gee talks of identity differences based on social and cultural views of identity and identifies four of these views, each of which are influenced by different forms of power, though they all have an effect on one another. Gee describes them as “four ways to formulate questions about how identity is functioning for a specific person (child or adult) in a given context or across a set of contexts” (p. 101).

The first of Gee's identity perspectives is what he calls “the nature perspective (or N-identities)” (p. 101). N-identity represents an identity people cannot control, one that comes from forces of nature. An example of this type of identity would be male or female. While the person has no control over the sex they were born with, this identity only means something because society and culture say this biological difference is important. Gee explains this idea further by stating, “N-identities must always gain their force as identities through the work of institutions, discourse and dialogue, or affinity groups, that is, the very forces that constitute our other perspectives on identity” (p. 102).

“[T]he institutional perspective (or I-identities)” (p. 102) refers to identities set by authorities within an institution. An example of an I-identity is a student, whose identity is defined by the school as an institution with rules and traditions the student must follow. Gee claims these I-identities can be something imposed on a person, such as being a prisoner, or can be a calling for the person, such as being a college professor.

The third perspective Gee identifies is the “discursive perspective (or D-identities)” (p. 103). D-identity refers to an individual trait, such as caring. D-identities are a matter of social interaction that only become identities because “other people treat, talk about, and interact” with the person in ways that bring forth and reinforce the trait (p. 103). According to Gee “D-identities can be placed on a continuum in terms of how active or passive one is in ‘recruiting’ them, that is, in terms of how much such identities can be viewed as merely ascribed to a person versus an active achievement or accomplishment of that person” (p. 104).

The final identity perspective Gee identifies is the “affinity perspective (or A-identities)” (p. 105). A-identities are built by shared experiences as part of an affinity group, which according to Gee's definition is a group that share “allegiance to, access to, and participation in specific practices” (p. 105). Joining these groups must be something the person has chosen to do and feels a part of in order for the A-identity to be built. Gee explains this further by stating, “While I could force someone to engage in specific practices, I really cannot coerce anyone into seeing the particular experiences connected to those practices as constitutive (in part) of the ‘kind of person’ they are” (p. 106).

== Selected works ==
- Gee. J. P. (1989). "Discourses, Socially-Culturally Situated Educational Theory, and the Failure Problem".
- Gee, J. P. (1990). Social linguistics and literacies: Ideology in discourses. London: Falmer Press. ISBN 978-0-203-94480-6
- Gee, J. P. (1992). The social mind: Language, ideology, and social practice. Series in language and ideology. New York: Bergin & Garvey. ISBN 978-0-89789-249-0
- Gee, J. P. (1999). An introduction to Discourse analysis: theory and method. London and New York: Routledge. ISBN 978-0-415-32860-9
- Gee, J. P. (2000). Identity as an analytic lens for research in education. Review of Research in Education, 25, 99-125.
- Gee, J. P. (2003). What Video Games Have to Teach Us About Learning and Literacy. New York: Palgrave Macmillan. ISBN 978-1-4039-6538-7
- Gee. J. P. (2004). Situated language and learning: A critique of traditional schooling. London: Routledge. ISBN 978-0-415-31776-4
- Gee. J. P. (2008). Policy Brief: Getting Over the Slump: Innovation Strategies to Promote Children's Learning. The Joan Ganz Cooney Center
- Gee. J. P. (2005). "Learning by Design: good video games as learning machines". E-Learning, Volume 2 (Number 1), p. 5-16
- Gee, J. P. & Elisabeth Hayes. (2011). Language and Learning in the Digital Age. London and New York: Routledge. ISBN 978-0-415-60277-8
