= Colin Lankshear =

Australian academic of digital literacies

Colin Lankshear is adjunct professor at James Cook University, Mount St Vincent University and McGill University. He is an internationally acclaimed scholar in the study of new literacies and digital technologies (cf., Lankshear 1987; Lankshear 1997; Lankshear & Snyder, 2000; Lankshear & Knobel, 2003; Lankshear & Knobel 2006; Knobel & Lankshear, 2007; Coiro, Knobel, Lankshear & Leu, 2008; Lankshear & Knobel, 2008).

Between 1976 and 1992 he worked at University of Auckland, before taking up a research director position at Queensland University of Technology from 1993-1998. In 1999 he moved to Mexico doing freelance work at distance for Central Queensland University. Between 2001 and 2004 he was a part-time Professorial Research Fellow at the University of Ballarat. Between 2005 and 2008 he was a visiting scholar at McGill University. He is currently working at Mount Saint Vincent University as a consultant postgraduate studies professor.

He specializes in language and literacy research, with a particular interest in new literacies associated with the explosion of the internet. He was originally trained as an educational philosopher at the University of Canterbury, with interests in political and moral philosophy. He completed his master's thesis in 1972, on the right to education. His doctoral thesis looked at freedom in education. In the course of his doctoral studies he became interested in a conception of freedom as liberation developed by the Brazilian educator Paulo Freire. This interest evolved into his first book on literacy (Lankshear 1987), which explored reading and writing in relation to schooling and revolutionary change. In the 1990s, Lankshear collaborated with James Paul Gee and Glynda Hull to develop an account of literacy and fast capitalism within "the new work order."

Lankshear's other academic interests include the nature and conduct of teacher research (Lankshear & Knobel, 2004). His work has been translated into several languages.

== Sources ==
- Coiro, J., Knobel, M., Lankshear, C. and Leu, D. (eds) (2008). The Handbook of Research on New Literacies. Mahwah, NJ: Erlbaum.
- Knobel, M. and Lankshear, C. (eds) (2007). A New Literacies Sampler. New York: Peter Lang.
- Lankshear, C. (1987/1989). Literacy, Schooling and Revolution. London: Falmer Press.
- Lankshear, C. (1997). Changing Literacies. Buckingham, UK: Open University Press.
- Lankshear, C. and Knobel, M. (2003). New Literacies: Changing Knowledge and Classroom Practice. Buckingham, UK: Open University Press.
- Lankshear, C. and Knobel, M. (2004). A Handbook for Teacher Research: From design to Implementation. Maidenhead, UK: Open University Press.
- Lankshear, C. and Knobel, M. (eds.) (2008). Digital Literacies: Concepts, Policies and Practices. New York: Peter Lang.
- Lankshear, C. and Knobel, M. (2006). New Literacies: Everyday Practices and Classroom Learning (second edition). Maidenhead and New York: Open University Press.
- Lankshear, C. and Snyder, I. (2000). Teachers and Technoliteracy. Sydney: Allen & Unwin.
- Gee, J. et al. (1997). The New Work Order: Behind the Language of the New Capitalism. Boulder, CO: Westview Press.
