= Games, Learning & Society Conference =

Academic conference

Games Learning and Society Conference
- Status: Active
- Genre: Multi-genre
- Venue: Varied
- Location: Irvine California
- Country: United States
- Inaugurated: 2005
- Most recent: 2022
- Organizer: Games Learning Society
- Filing status: Non-profit

The Games + Learning + Society Conference (GLS Conference) was an academic conference. From 2003 to 2016, the conference was held at the University of Wisconsin-Madison, and in 2022 it was held at the University of California Irvine. The founder and chair is Constance Steinkuehler.

The GLS conference examines how games can be used to transform how people learn and what implications that knowledge has for society.
