= Carmen Sandiego =

Media franchise

- A previous logo for the game series used during the third generation of Broderbund games; the franchise's current logo is the logo from the Netflix animated series.
- Created by: Gene Portwood; Dane Bigham; Lauren Elliott
- Original work: Where in the World Is Carmen Sandiego? (1985)
- Owner: HarperCollins
- Years: 1985-present

Films and television
- Film(s): Where in the Universe Is Carmen Sandiego? (1999 planetarium film)
- Short film(s): Carmen Sandiego: To Steal or Not to Steal (2020)^{*}
- Television series: Where in the World Is Carmen Sandiego? (1991–1995); Where in Time Is Carmen Sandiego? (1996–1997)
- Animated series: Where on Earth Is Carmen Sandiego? (1994–1999); Carmen Sandiego (2019–2021)

Theatrical presentations
- Play(s): Where in the Universe Is Carmen Sandiego?
- Musical(s): Where in the World of Music Is Carmen Sandiego?

Games
- Video game(s): Computer game series (since 1985)

Audio
- Soundtrack(s): Where in the World Is Carmen Sandiego? (1992); Carmen Sandiego: Out of This World (1994)

Miscellaneous
- Annual event: Carmen Sandiego Day
- ^{*} Interactive short that is part of the 2019 Netflix animated series.

Carmen Sandiego (sometimes referred to as Where in the World Is Carmen Sandiego?) is a media franchise based on a series of computer video games created by the American software company Broderbund. While the original 1985 Where in the World Is Carmen Sandiego? video game was classified as a "mystery exploration" series by creators and the media, the series would later be deemed edutainment when the games became unexpectedly popular in classrooms. The franchise centers around the fictional thieving villain of the same name, who is the ringleader of the criminal organization V.I.L.E.; the protagonists (most often including the in-game character controlled by the computer user) are agents of the ACME Detective Agency who try to thwart the crooks' plans to steal treasures from around the world, while the later ultimate goal is to capture Carmen Sandiego herself.

The franchise primarily focuses on teaching children geography, but has also branched out into history, mathematics, language arts, and other subjects. An attempt was made to create a series of state-specific games in the 1980s, but the only prototype to be completed was in North Dakota. Beginning in 1988, Carmen Sandiego Days became popular across American public schools. In the 1990s, the franchise extended into three television shows, books and comics, board games, a concert series, two planetarium shows, and two music albums. By 1996, the Carmen Sandiego character and game concept had been licensed to over 20 companies including HarperCollins, University Games, Great American Puzzle Factory, DIC Entertainment, WGBH/WQED, Micro Games of America, Publications International and Troll Associates. Towards the turn of the 21st century, the Carmen Sandiego property passed through a series of five corporate hands: Broderbund (1985–1997), The Learning Company (1998), Mattel (1999), The Gores Group (2000), and Riverdeep (2001–present). Subsequent acquisitions and mergers of Riverdeep (licensed to Encore) led to the franchise currently being in the possession of Houghton Mifflin Harcourt. For the next 15 years, the series would become mostly dormant despite a few licensed games. In 2017, soon after Netflix commissioned an animated show based on the property, HMH hired Brandginuity to reboot Carmen Sandiego through a licensing program built around the show and the franchise as a whole including toys, games, and apparel. HMH Productions, established in 2018, is currently the content incubator, production company, and brand manager for Carmen Sandiego. HMH Productions co-produced the animated Netflix TV series Carmen Sandiego, which ran for four seasons from 2019 to 2021 (including a 2020 interactive special), and is set to produce a live-action film as well.

The franchise has become known for its ability to surreptitiously teach facts, breed empathy for other cultures, and develop logic skills, while creating detective mystery experiences intended to entertain. One aspect of the series that has received consistent praise by critics is its representation of strong, independent, and intelligent women.

Carmen Sandiego has maintained a considerable popularity and commercial success over its history. Carmen Sandiego is one of the top 30 longest-running video game series, having existed for just over 30 years with the release of Returns in 2015. By 1997, Carmen Sandiego games had been translated into three different languages, and over 5 million copies had been sold into schools and homes worldwide. The three 1990s-airing television shows have together been nominated for 45 Daytime Emmy Awards (winning 8), while World also won a Peabody Award. They had a combined viewing audience of over 10 million viewers each week.

== History of franchise ==
Carmen Sandiego media release years
1985	World (1985 video game)
1986	U.S.A. (1986 video game)
1987
1988	Europe (video game)
1988	Carmen Sandiego Day (annual event)
1989	North Dakota (video game)
1989	Time (video game)
1989	Japan (video game)
1990
1991	America's Past (video game)
1991	Carmen Sandiego (John Peel book series)
1991	World (TV show)
1992	Carmen Sandiego (board games)
1992	World (album)
1993	Space (video game)
1994	Out of This World (album)
1994	Earth (TV series)
1995	Junior Detective (video game)
1995	World of Music (concert series)
1996	World (1996 video game)
1996	U.S.A. (1996 video game)
1996	DC Comics (comic books)
1996	Time (TV show)
1997	Great Chase Through Time (video game)
1997	Carmen Sandiego (Melissa Peterson book series)
1997	Word Detective (video game)
1998	Math Detective (video game)
1999	Think Quick Challenge (video game)
1999	Universe (planetarium show)
2000
2001	Treasures of Knowledge (video game)
2002
2003	Universe II (planetarium show)
2004	The Secret of the Stolen Drums (video game)
2005
2006
2007
2008
2009	New Carmen Adventure (video game)
2010
2011	World (2011 video game)
2011	Adventures in Math (video games)
2012
2013
2014
2015	Returns (video game)
2016
2017
2018
2019	Carmen Sandiego (TV series)
2019	Carmen Sandiego (Houghton Mifflin Harcourt book series)
2019	Google Earth (video games)
2020	To Steal or Not to Steal (interactive film)
2021
2022
2023
2024
2025	Carmen Sandiego (video game)

=== Broderbund era (1985–1998) ===
I think the problem is that geography, like far too many things, is presented as dry and dull and boring by people who must have personally found it that way. I don't think it has to be ... We don't use the word 'educational' anywhere on any of our products. The term translates into 'boring' in kidspeak. I prefer 'explorational'.

— Broderbund CEO Doug Carlston

The original game idea started in 1983 from Broderbund programmer Dane Bigham, wanting to take the idea of text adventure games like Colossal Cave Adventure, but create a menu-driven interface to be played on the Apple II computer. Initial work was done with Broderbund's "Rubber Room" artists, Gene Portwood and Lauren Elliott, creating a game where the player would chase down various crooks. Broderbund co-founder Gary Carlston suggested changing the concept to be focused on geography, anticipating shipping copies of The World Almanac to let players research clues and find the right answers for geography questions.

Bigham focused more on the interface, and Carlston hired David Siefkin to write the game's story. Siefkin had traveled around the world with a backpack and a map, and had also played "Colossal Cave Adventure". In his draft he substituted real countries for the rooms of the cave, and proposed a list of villains, including Carmen Sandiego. The other staff found this name mysterious and exotic, in addition to being a female character they could use to attract younger women to the game. From Siefkin's script, they expanded out the idea of the criminal organization V.I.L.E. - Villains' International League of Evil – and the ACME Detective Agency – with ACME jokingly considered an initialism for "A Company that Makes Everything". The core gameplay was then established, having the player as an ACME recruit to chase down underlings within V.I.L.E., following geography-based clues to complete their search, and working up their ranks in ACME until they were tasked to go after Carmen herself. The game proved successful, unexpected from the educational market, as it became a staple in many classrooms.

Portwood and Ellliot produced storyboards and initial graphics, while staff completed the software. They used a "Carmen bible" to maintain quality and consistency. Each design team consisted of 8-10 people. If a game idea became dull within a week, it was discarded. Games were play-tested in schools prior to release in order to identify problems. Prior to Carmen Sandiego, Broderbund had been involved in distributing and marketing software; therefore careful consideration was put into how to market the franchise. Awareness was built through editorials in magazines, placement on retailer shelves, and promotions. The launch price of $38 was chosen to suit cost-constrained teachers. Playing an entertaining game at schools led to children beginning to request the game from their parents, leading to a "pull-through effect" in the distribution chain. Broderbund emphasized that the games were fun and labelled them 'explorations' rather than highlighting the educational aspect. The game play succeeded in this by giving the player a sense of agency while travelling through an adventure and chasing the villain. Broderbund included response cards in their games to gather information, which once in a database could be used via direct mail to sell upgrades or future products. According to New Product Success Stories: Lessons from Leading Innovators, Broderbund had also built an "organisational capacity that supports creativity" and was customer focused on its game development.

From 1986 to 1998, Broderbund followed the first Carmen Sandiego video game with U.S.A., Europe, Time, America's Past, Space, and Junior Detective, reboots of World, U.S.A., and Great Chase Through Time, and finally released Word Detective and Math Detective. The first seven games of the franchise were each awarded one or more SPA Excellence in Software Awards, particularly for their educational effort. In 1991, Broderbund went public, trading on the NASDAQ stock exchange as BROD. At the time, the Carmen Sandiego games were Broderbund's second-biggest revenue source, comprising 26% of total revenue; the biggest was The Print Shop, which brought in 33% of revenue. By 1997, Carmen Sandiego games had been translated into three different languages and over 5 million copies had been sold into schools and homes, worldwide.

Carmen Sandiego also appeared in three television shows during this era. The World game show was broadcast on PBS from 1991 to 1996 and won six Daytime Emmy Awards and a Peabody Award. World was followed by Time, which was cancelled in 1998 due to the geography-based premise having "run its entire course". It was acknowledged that history can be more subjective than geography, but the show hoped to tackle more challenging material like the infamous Japanese American internment camps during World War II in a straightforward and educational way. The Earth animated series was broadcast on FOX from 1994 to 1999. In 1996, President Bill Clinton stated: "When I met the co-leaders of San Marino at the Olympics, I knew where it was because of Carmen Sandiego".

=== The Learning Company era (1998–present) ===
After Brøderbund ceased to exist in 1998, The Learning Company apparently sought to redesign the series. The company determined that the brand was stagnating but thought it easier to revive an established brand than start a new one. Under The Learning Company, the series seems to take its premise more seriously and uses character-based humor. Since The Learning Company has only created two Carmen Sandiego games, one of which is no longer sold. This change is evident mainly through the marketing of select Brøderbund products.

The first title released by The Learning Company was ThinkQuick Challenge, a quiz game with a similar tonality to Word Detective and Math Detective, which included the reappearance of Chase Devineaux. The new structure of Time was apparently to The Learning Company's liking since their new version of World, titled Treasures of Knowledge, was similar. The Learning Company decided to return the series to its original focus on geography, discontinuing Word Detective, Math Detective, and ThinkQuick Challenge.

In 2004, Bam! Entertainment released The Secret of the Stolen Drums on the GameCube, Xbox, and PlayStation 2. It is so far the only game of the franchise to use real-time 3D computer graphics, although many previous games had used pre-rendered 3D graphics. It was also an action game and while geographical facts were included, learning them was not necessary to complete the game. Although The Learning Company evidently licensed the use of the series as well as some of their own characters from Treasures of Knowledge, this game is not distributed by or sold under The Learning Company name. An animated Netflix series, Carmen Sandiego, aired for four seasons from 2019 to 2021.

== Entries in the franchise ==
More a series than a collection of sequels, Carmen has gone around the world and across the country, invaded the continent, and gone back in time twice. Only a series as strong as Carmen could have spawned not only books and board games, but a PBS TV show, too. This five-part series is easily the best selling "edutainment" title ever.

— PC Magazine, 1992

=== Video games ===
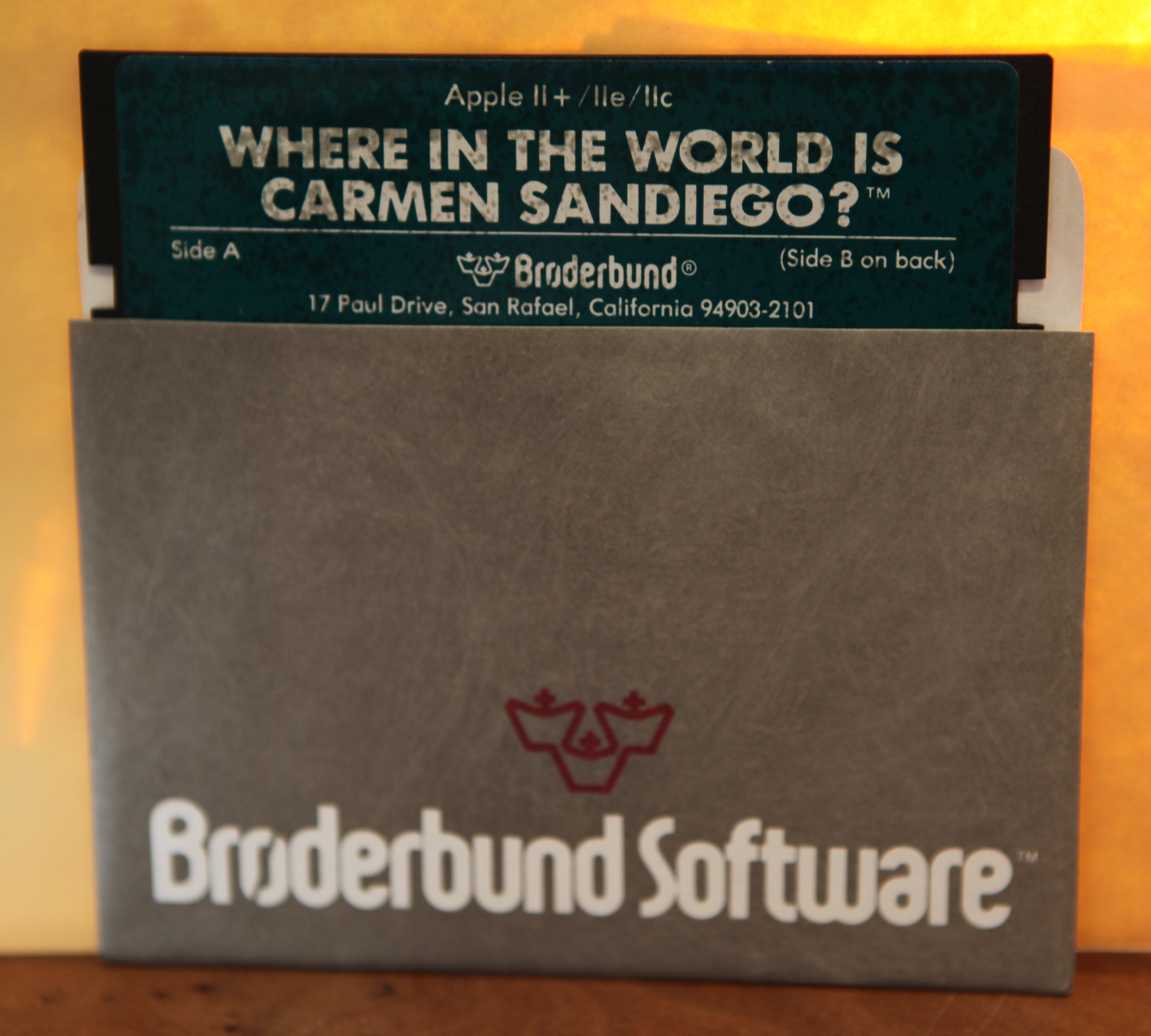
A copy of the 1985 video game Where in the World Is Carmen Sandiego? in 5¼-inch floppy disk format for the Apple II Plus personal computer.

The Carmen Sandiego franchise began with the classic video game in 1985, Where in the World Is Carmen Sandiego?. Each subsequent video game in the series has a particular theme and subject, where the player must use their knowledge to find Carmen Sandiego or any of her myriad henchmen. This series was originally owned and developed by Broderbund, but is now owned by Houghton Mifflin Harcourt.

The most recent entry in the Carmen Sandiego franchise is a video game developed by Gameloft and released in 2025, based on the Netflix animated series.

=== Television shows ===
==== World ====
This was the PBS game show designed for children ages 8–12. The World game show was staged in a slightly off-skew detective office, which was part of the ACME agency with Lynne Thigpen portraying "The Chief" and Greg Lee portraying himself as a special agent in charge of training new recruits. Greg was helped in this training by various live-action and animated characters. Among the show's most popular were the members of the a cappella house band and comedy troupe, Rockapella, who also sang the show's main theme song.

The game was played in three rounds: the first round was Q&A, where the two gumshoes with the highest scores proceeded to a second round. In the second round, the two remaining gumshoes had to find the loot, the warrant, and the cartoon crook in the correct order. The winning gumshoe captured the day's crook and later advanced to the third and final round to capture Carmen Sandiego. As Greg shouted the names or places in a region of the world, the gumshoe had to place a marker on the corresponding place on a giant map of that area within a 45-second time limit. A successful gumshoe who placed all the correct locations and captured Carmen Sandiego would win a trip to anywhere in the contiguous United States and later in North America.

==== Time ====
The Time game show refocused the show on history, but was otherwise similar to World with Thigpen reprising her role as "The Chief". Kevin Shinick portrayed himself as a Time Pilot Squadron Leader and Rockapella was replaced by a different dance group, The Engine Crew. Gameplay for the first two rounds were much the same as World; whereas the third and final round involved the pilot answering six various history-related questions to open time gates. If the pilot answered correctly, he/she passed through the gate. Otherwise, the pilot had to turn a crank, pull a lever, or do some other task within the 90-second time limit. A successful pilot who passed through all six gates and captured Carmen Sandiego would win a personal computer.

==== Earth ====
The Earth animated series was a Saturday morning cartoon series produced by DIC Entertainment. The series features the adventures of Zack and Ivy, two teenage siblings who work as ACME agents in San Francisco and are aided by the Max Headroom–like Chief, who had to stop Carmen Sandiego and her henchmen from stealing artifacts from around the world. The series was the first Saturday-morning children's program ever to win the Daytime Emmy Award for Outstanding Children's Animated Program, in 1996. Its episodes have subsequently been aired on the Fox Family Channel, the Pax network, Hub TV, and Univision. The first season was released on DVD by Shout! Factory in 2006 and the complete series was later released by Mill Creek Entertainment in 2012.

==== Netflix series ====
The second animated series, Carmen Sandiego, is co-produced by Netflix, where it aired for four seasons from 2019 to 2021. In this series, Carmen Sandiego is not a villain or antihero, but the heroine, who is recruited to V.I.L.E. in infancy and trained as a master thief, only to turn against them and seek to undo their thievery.

=== Book series and comics ===
==== John Peel book series ====
In the early 1990s, in response to the successful Carmen Sandiego franchise, "editor Sharon Shavers was tasked with turning the games into a book series". She gave the responsibility to John Peel. His research consisted of playing all the games, and this was followed by "Sharon and [him] work[ing] out a format for the series" before he commenced writing. While in the past his natural tendency to add jokes to his work had been looked down upon, "Sharon [actually] asked [him] to put more in". The art was done by Allan Neuwirth. The premise of each choose-your-own-adventure book is that "you are the detective", and each title features "four exciting detective adventures inside!". The books are written in the second person and in present tense, and have removable inserts that provided clues and the identities of the villains. The books are published by the Canadian branch of Golden Books Publishing. Western Publishing was planning a September 1991 debut. Inspired by the video games, Peel wrote 16 new cases in the original four-book series. The books came with insert cards which became important in solving the cases.

1. Where In The World Is Carmen Sandiego? (1991)
2. Where In The USA Is Carmen Sandiego? (1991)
3. Where In Europe Is Carmen Sandiego? (1991)
4. Where In Time Is Carmen Sandiego? (1991)
5. Where In America's Past Is Carmen Sandiego? (1992)
6. Where In Time Is Carmen Sandiego, Part II (1993)
7. Where In Space Is Carmen Sandiego? (1993)
8. Where In The USA Is Carmen Sandiego? Part II (1994)
9. Where In America Is Carmen Sandiego? (1992) – this title was, as opposed to the others, "a picture book like Where's Waldo?", and the only picture book Peel ever wrote.
10. Where Is Carmen Sandiego? Calendar (1993) – this title was written for Workman Publishing, and Peel considers it "the strangest – and most difficult – writing job [he] ever had"

==== Carmen Sandiego Mystery series ====
In 1997 a series of junior novels was written by various authors and illustrated by S. M. Taggart. Each book in the series was subtitled A Carmen Sandiego Mystery and featured child detectives Ben and Maya as the protagonists. Six books were released:

- Color Me Criminal by Ellen Weiss and Mel Friedman
- Hasta la Vista, Blarney by Melissa Peterson
- One T. Rex Over Easy by Bonnie Bader and Tracey West
- The Cocoa Commotion by Melissa Peterson
- Take the Mummy and Run by Ellen Weiss and Mel Friedman
- Highway Robbery by Bonnie Bader and Tracey West

==== Comic book series ====
From mid 1996 to early 1997, four Carmen Sandiego comic books were published by DC in a series entitled Where in the World Is Carmen Sandiego?. They involved the exploits of Evan Sawyer, "Acme Detective Agency's newest and youngest gumshoe".

- Issue #1 (June 1996)
- Issue #2 (September 1996)
- Issue #3 (November 1996)
- Issue #4 (January 1997)

==== Miscellaneous ====
- The Official Carmen Sandiego Clue Books (Harper Trophy Publishers)
- Carmen Sandiego Mystery Adventure Novels (Harper Trophy Publishers)
- Carmen Sandiego Travel Activity Books (Troll Associates)
- Bi-monthly Carmen Sandiego comic strip in National Geographic Society World Magazine

=== Board games ===
University Games published a number of board games, and at least one card game, based on Carmen Sandiego throughout the 1990s. To promote the first board game, Broderbund made a special offer around Christmas when any Carmen Sandiego video game was purchased in tandem.

- Where in Time Is Carmen Sandiego? card game.
- Where in the World Is Carmen Sandiego? (1992)
  - The designer is A. Robert Moog
  - The number of players is 2 − 6
  - The suggested playing time is 60min
  - The suggested ages are 10 and up
  - The game has two parts. First, players collect clues to work out which of Carmen's henchmen stole the landmark. Afterwards, players race to see who can catch the crook first.
- Where in the USA Is Carmen Sandiego? (1993)
  - The number of players is 2 − 6
  - The suggested playing time is 60min
  - The suggested ages are 8 and up
- Where In The World Is Carmen Sandiego? Card Game (1993)
  - The number of players is 2 − 10
  - The suggested playing time is 15min
  - The suggested ages are 10 and up
- Where in the World Is Carmen Sandiego? Junior Detective Edition (1994)
  - The number of players is 2 − 4
  - The suggested playing time is 30min
  - The suggested ages are 4 and up
- Where in Space Is Carmen Sandiego (1995)
  - The number of players is 2 − 4
  - The suggested playing time is 60min
- Where in Time Is Carmen Sandiego (1996)
  - The number of players is 2 − 4
  - The suggested playing time is 60min
  - The suggested ages are 8 and up

=== Other media ===
==== Planetarium films ====
Where in the Universe Is Carmen Sandiego? is a movie that was made to be played in a planetarium. It is less like a traditional movie, and more like one of the Carmen Sandiego game shows featured on PBS with the live audience as the detectives. This film also featured Lynne Thigpen as "The Chief" and was based on Where in Space Is Carmen Sandiego?. This marked Thigpen's final appearance of the franchise before her death of a cerebral hemorrhage on March 12, 2003. A sequel was later created called Where in the Universe Is Carmen Sandiego? - II.

==== Concerts ====
Where in the World of Music Is Carmen Sandiego? is a concert series developed by Gary Sheldon. It consists of 3 concerts: The Case of the Missing Concert Hall, The Case of the Missing Bells, and The Case of the Missing Pyramids.

==== Films ====
By 1991, rumours were swirling about a movie adaptation of Carmen Sandiego. In 1998, Walt Disney Pictures extended a first-look deal with DIC Entertainment subsidiary DIC Films. One such planned film involved Sandra Bullock as the title character.

In 2011, Walden Media announced its own plans to make a live action film with Jennifer Lopez as both Carmen Sandiego and producer of the film with her production company Nuyorican Productions. Writer Darren Lemke was attached to write the screenplay in July 2012.

In 2018, while the Netflix animated series Carmen Sandiego was still in production, Netflix announced plans to produce a related live action film adaptation, to star Gina Rodriguez, who also voiced the title character in the series. Rodriguez is set to co-produce the film, alongside Kevin Misher and the series' executive producer, Caroline Fraser. In September 2021, the official Twitter account for the Carmen Sandiego animated series confirmed that the live-action film was in the "early stages."

==== Other ====
In the late 1990s, the Metro Washington Park Zoo in Portland, Oregon, (now the Oregon Zoo), in conjunction with Broderbund, ran a summer-long event titled "Where in the Zoo Is Carmen Sandiego?", which functioned as a full-immersion live-action Carmen game in which zoo patrons were the investigating detectives. Actors were hired to play Carmen's henchmen, who could be found around the zoo, and on occasions a costumed Carmen appeared as well, but never in a location where patrons could interact with her. Clues were given out at various stations by members of the ZooTeens volunteer group. Campers aim to solve the mysteries and return the park to normal.

In 2016, NPR held an homage to the WinWiCS gameshow entitled "Where in the Mall Is Carmen Sandiego?", in which incoming theft reports from ACME CrimeNet are relayed to contestants who must then work out which store in the mall is being referred to. It was part of the podcast NPR Programs: Ask Me Another.

The Carmen Sandiego Licensing Program saw the Carmen Sandiego brand licensed to over 20 companies including HarperCollins, University Games, Great American Puzzle Factory, DIC Entertainment, WGBH/WQED, Micro Games of America, Publications International and Troll Associates.

The Carmen Sandiego Connection website allowed players and fans to discover more about the franchise.

Pacific Bell Carmen Sandiego Prepaid Phone Cards were made available.

"Where in the Valley Is Carmen Sandiego?" was a scavenger hunt held in Yakima, Washington in 2017.

== Awards ==
By 1997, the franchise had received over 60 awards, including 12 Software Publishers Association Excellence Awards for Best Education Programs and 7 Parents' Choice Awards. By 2000, the franchise had won over 90 awards. They include:

- Where in the USA Is Carmen Sandiego? Version 3.0: World Class Award – Best CD-ROM for Children, PC World, July 1997
- Where in the World Is Carmen Sandiego? Version 3.0: "Best Software of '97 – around the world for ages 9-12", Child Magazine, Dec/Jan 1997
- Where in the USA Is Carmen Sandiego? Version 3.0: "Best Software of '97 – around the world for ages 9-12", Child Magazine, Dec/Jan 1997
- Carmen Sandiego Series: Family PC – Top 50 Products, Family PC, July/August 1997
- Where in the World Is Carmen Sandiego? Version 2.0, 1996 PC World Class Award, PC World, 1996
- Carmen Sandiego Junior Detective Edition, Silver Apple Award, National Educational Media Network, May 1996
- Where in the World Is Carmen Sandiego? Version 2.0, Codie Award – Best Secondary Education Program, Software Publishers Association, March 1995
- Where in the World Is Carmen Sandiego?, Excellence in Software Awards – Best Early Education Program, Software Publishers Association, September 1995
- Carmen Sandiego Junior Detective Edition, 1996 Newsweek Editors' Choice Award, Newsweek, August 1995
- Where in the World Is Carmen Sandiego?, NAPPA Gold Winner for Children's Software, The 1995 National Parenting Publications Award, December 1995

== Critical response and legacy ==
The commercial success of Carmen Sandiego is due in part to its intrinsic fantasy that makes the game both fun and educational. The skill and the fantasy are intertwined, resulting in a much more engaging experience. When playing educational games with intrinsic fantasies, the users are more motivated to apply their educational skills because it feels natural, not arbitrary.

— Craig Brannon, Legacy Software Director of Education, "Making Things Fun to Learn: Principles of Edutainment Design " presentation at the 1997 Computer Game Developers' Conference.

The series as a whole has been met with critical acclaim, although most of the games released after Broderbund was sold to The Learning Company have received mixed to negative reviews.

A review by Mr. Bill & Lela for Mr. Bill's Adventureland Review says of the 1996 game Where in the World Is Carmen Sandiego? "It teaches knowledge of world geography and cultures, electronic database research skills, map reading and deductive reasoning. This game became so popular that there is a whole series of them out now: Where in the USA, Where in Time, etc. It's a great game and one that is often used in schools today." The 1991 document Three Instructional Approaches to Carmen Sandiego Software Series outlined three ways in which the Carmen Sandiego series could be utilized in an educational context: turning teacher instruction into a gamified cooperative/competitive experience, linking the previously discrete academic topics, and not playing it in its entirety but isolating segments for lessons on particular items. The 1994 journal article "The impact of a computer-based adventure game on achievement and attitudes in geography" by J. H. Wiebe and N. J. Martin found that there were no "significant differences in recall of geography facts or attitudes between the teaching methods" of the computer game Where in the World Is Carmen Sandiego? and a "non-computer-based board-style geography game". Kotaku explains the duality of the franchise thus: "In concept, it [is] a light edutainment game. In practice, it [is] a gateway to the rest of the world." Compute said of the series, "Although the gameplay varies only slightly from one title to the next, these games continue to be entertaining and, best of all, painlessly educational—a tough combination to beat".

The Educational Technology Handbook says that the series "engage[s] youth in tracking elusive villains across the earth". It suggest that the many games in the franchise "...hold your child's interest by putting them in touch with real-life places and events in a way no formal history or geography lesson can match". From Barbie to Mortal Kombat: Gender and Computer Games suggests that software games like Where in the World Is Carmen Sandiego? challenge ideas of gender stereotypes in regard to games, due to it "hav[ing] equal appeal for boys and girls". In 2001, the Los Angeles Times said "even the most sophisticated recent titles have a hard time competing with Carmen Sandiego, the grand dame of teaching kids where in the world they are". The Stanford paper "Why in the World Is Carmen Sandiego a Success?" by Todd Brown explained the long-lasting appeal of the series: "Ultimately, the keyfactor of success for the Carmen series has been cultural. The designers were able to appeal to all children, boys and girls, by developing an experience with something for everyone. Goals, conversations, intrigue, suspense, learning geography... it's all there. Furthermore, they did it without just shoving a geography lesson down kids' throats and without talking down to them either". He quoted Elliott, who said "We don't use small words. Kids are short but not stupid", and concluded "By treating children as the intelligent little people they are, the designers had no need to hide from them the fact that they were playing and learning at the same time. Kids knew. The beauty of Carmen Sandiego is that they kept playing anyway."

PC Games deemed it the first product to "defy characterisation", being a game to some and an education tool to others.

Uruguayan indie rock band Carmen Sandiego takes the name of the character.
