= Lauren Elliott =

American game designer

- Known for: Creator of Carmen Sandiego

Lauren Elliott is an American video game designer, internet entrepreneur, publisher and inventor. He is recognized as one of the pioneers in the edutainment video game industry.

Elliott's greatest success to date came as the original co-designer for the Carmen Sandiego game series which remains the best-selling edutainment game in history.

== Biography ==
Lauren Elliott is the grandson of Hall Roosevelt, brother of Eleanor Roosevelt.

== Education ==
After graduating from the Millbrook School for Boys, Elliott attended Cornell University, transferring three years later to the University of Colorado Boulder, where he received his degree in architecture. Becoming interested in environmental design, he then studied briefly at the University of Pennsylvania under Ian McHarg, followed by two years of graduate work in ecology at the University of California, Davis.

== Career in game design ==
In 1983, Elliott walked into Broderbund Software in San Rafael, California, with a sketchpad full of game designs and was hired on the provision that he could convince a programmer to take on one of his designs. Over the next 13-year period he authored and worked on more than 23 titles. He now has over 30 million copies of his work in circulation and is a winner of over 50 awards in originality and lifetime sales categories.

While at Broderbund, Elliott and Gene Portwood were Will Wright's project managers on his first video game, Raid on Bungeling Bay, in 1984.

In 1996, Elliott left to form Elliott Portwood Productions with his partner Gene Portwood. During the next four years, they produced titles for The Learning Company, Maxis Software, Virgin Software, and The Software Toolworks.

In 2002, Elliott formed Dream Zero, an internet gaming company, later acquired by The Big Network.

In 2005, Elliott published a book – With Love, Aunt Eleanor – written by his mother, who is the niece of Eleanor Roosevelt.

Elliott is currently the Executive Producer of Proxi.

== Games designed by Elliott ==
- Where in the World Is Carmen Sandiego?
- Where in the U.S.A. Is Carmen Sandiego?
- Where in Time Is Carmen Sandiego?
- Where in Europe Is Carmen Sandiego?
- Where in America's Past Is Carmen Sandiego?
- Where in Space Is Carmen Sandiego?
- Where in North Dakota Is Carmen Sandiego?
- Widget Workshop
- Marty in Where’s Morgan
- Marty and the Trouble with Cheese
- Reader Rabbit's Ready for Letters
- Time Riders in American History
- Mario is Missing
- Mario's Time Machine
- Science Toolkit Master Module
- Science Toolkit Speed and Motion
- Science Toolkit Body Module
- Science Toolkit Earthquake Lab
- Whistler's Brother
- Captain Goodnight and the Islands of Fear
- Galleons of Glory: The Secret Voyage of Magellan
- VCR Companion
- Shufflepuck Café
