= Where in North Dakota Is Carmen Sandiego? =

1989 video game

- Developers: North Dakota Database Committee; Broderbund
- Publisher: Broderbund
- Director: Craig Nansen
- Designers: Gene Portwood; Lauren Elliott
- Programmer: Ken Bull
- Writer: North Dakota Database Committee
- Composer: Louis Ewens
- Series: Carmen Sandiego
- Platform: Apple II
- Release: NA: February 23, 1989
- Genre: Educational
- Mode: Single-player

Where in North Dakota Is Carmen Sandiego? is a 1989 educational video game. It is the fourth game in the Carmen Sandiego video game series after World (1985), U.S.A. (1986), and Europe (1988). Having observed the popularity of the Carmen Sandiego franchise in the education of school children, educators were inspired to develop a North Dakota version to teach North Dakotans about their state's history and geography.

In contrast to the previous titles which were developed internally by Broderbund, North Dakota was largely developed for the Apple II by a team of fourteen educators led by computer coordinator Craig Nansen, concept designer Bonny Berryman, and co-chairwoman Mary Littler collectively known as the North Dakota Database Committee (NDDC) of the Minot Public Schools, who made the game idea a reality.

This "franchise extension" is the only game in the series based on a U.S. state and was patterned after the previous games in the then-four year old series. Intended as a type of "pilot program" to test whether region-specific versions for the remaining 49 states were financially viable, the game was released in celebration of North Dakota's centennial celebration in 1989. Although 5,000 school copies were sold to schools in the region, the game has become extremely rare and only three retail copies are known to exist. There is disagreement as to whether or not they are complimentary versions offered to educators who worked on the project, or stock left for mail order at a North Dakota game shop. There is currently no proof that retail copies were ever sold in stores.

The game was "save[d] from the memory hole of history" by video game historian Frank Cifaldi and his archivist organization The Video Game History Foundation (VGHF). He believes the game is a great example of history that might have been lost had he not recovered documents for his archival not-for-profit organization.

== Gameplay ==
Where in North Dakota is Carmen Sandiego? is a first-person history and geography-based edutainment game for the Apple II platform. The interface of Where in North Dakota... is similar to the other games in the series, World, U.S.A., and Europe. Two design changes were made for this game. The language was softened—"criminals" are called "imposters" and "crimes" are called "pranks"— and a four-wheel drive vehicle is used to travel between locations instead of an airplane. Where in North Dakota ... includes 38 locations within the state, 50 famous people connected to it, 16 pun-named gang members, and over 1,000 factual clues.

Players begin in the office of the NoDak Detective Agency. They type their name into the crime computer using up to 14 characters and are informed about the case. Players are sent to the scene of the crime and tasked with capturing Carmen Sandiego and her cronies by questioning witnesses. Using these clues, players decipher the appearance of the imposters and follow their geographic trail to locations such as the International Peace Garden, Cando, and the Standing Rock Indian Reservation.

Players always have six days' worth of allotted time to track down the crook and create a correct warrant. Every time the player captures three imposters, they are promoted to a higher rank and the game's difficulty increases. More difficult clues provided by witnesses are added to the pool, and players must travel to more locations related to the case; the lowest rank requires the player travel to four different locations, while the hardest level has them travel to 14. They must advance 10 ranks before having an opportunity to catch Carmen herself. When they do catch her, they are placed into the North Dakota Roughrider Detective Hall of Fame, which contains 16 slots.

Solving clues requires research using sources other than the game, which at the time meant almanacs, maps, and biographical dictionaries focused on North Dakota. In doing so, players learn facts about the geography, environment, economy, and history of the state, as well as techniques for conducting research, using databases, and deductive reasoning. The teacher's guide also suggests the game can be used to teach students skills in: using maps, thinking, studying, comprehension, vocabulary, writing, and computer literacy. The teacher's guide notes that while skill is an important factor, luck is also very important. The elements of each case are randomly generated which means repeats of the same case can have vastly different results. It is also possible, albeit highly unlikely, for a game not to provide enough character clues for the suspect to be identified, so that even the most conscientious players may occasionally be unsuccessful.

=== Screens ===
The Main Playing Screen contains the location name, day/time, location description, and four other options that help the player progress. Notes are written in the Notebook, while warrants are issued in the Crime Lab. Choosing "Investigate" allows the player to discover Character Clues and Location Clues, while "Go To Gas Station" allows the player to travel to the next location.

=== Materials ===
Unlike previous Carmen Sandiego games, rather than including an almanac or reference work, the developers opted to use an online database to provide the clues. The North Dakotan educators wanted to include computerized materials in the game to allow their teachers to use the software as an instructional tool; this led to them "chang[ing] the Carmen Sandiego program" and adding 16 different databases to the title with topics like parks and minerals.

In the school version, the game's packaging consisted of a full lesson plan: a binder with a manual, a North Dakota state almanac, and the game on a double-side floppy disk. The binder included other information such as head shots of Carmen's henchmen, a map of North Dakota, and a page that asks the player to describe the game's final scene and mail it in to receive a prize. Other pages have a print version of the almanac and information about the cities in the game. A teacher's guide is also included. A second binder contains activities that correlate to the 18 database disks included in the package. A North Dakota centennial blue book and a booklet entitled Governors and First Ladies of North Dakota were also included in this binder. The retail version of the game was cased in a game box stylized like the earlier games.

== History ==
The North Dakota Database Committee

=== Conception ===
An opening screen of the game, indicating its release as part of North Dakota's centennial celebrations.

Having observed the popularity of the Carmen Sandiego franchise in the education of school children, educators were inspired to develop a North Dakota version to teach North Dakotans about their state's history and geography. In early 1987, the Minot Public Schools system was looking for "an interesting way to teach students and educators the basics of using a database". After observing Where in the U.S.A.'s ability to hold her child's attention for hours, Bonny Berryman, an eighth grade social studies teacher at Erik Ramstad Junior High, came up with the idea of a special Carmen Sandiego program that would coincide with the state's centennial year. She felt the game could teach children how to "retrieve information from computers, rather than memorize it", an important skill given the abundance of available information in the computer age. She also knew that the franchise had achieved "great acceptance throughout [the] district and state" and believed the game could appeal to adults who would find it fascinating and informative. She deemed the Carmen Sandiego games a "novelty", allowing students to have fun while learning; she also liked the opportunity for randomness, and the graphics, color, movement, and sound that other media such as board games did not provide. She noted that the target market played video games every weekend and this was a franchise with which they were already familiar. She pitched the idea to Minot Public School System computer coordinator Craig Nansen, who was initially skeptical, describing it as a "pipe dream or pie-in-the-sky idea". However, he saw promise in the idea of stimulating research by encouraging students to use an encyclopedia or dictionary to decipher clues about their state, thereby adding a state-based component to the database project. Additionally, his goal was to represent "'cool' software [that] attract[s] the attention of board members, superintendents, etc. [while being] educationally sound". He subsequently contacted series developer Broderbund about the possibility of creating the game, a prospect they liked. At the time, the recent success of Carmen Sandiego Days had resulted in schools from many states asking Broderbund to make state-specific versions of their games to fit into their Carmen Days.

=== Development ===
At the time, Broderbund CEO Doug Carston preferred to describe the series as "explorational" rather that "educational". In his opinion the term "educational... translate[d] into 'boring' in kidspeak". But when Nansen approached the company, he argued that while the series "wasn't meant to be an educational tool", it greatly appealed to educators and Where in North Dakota... should be developed for this purpose. Nansen recalled that "things fell into place and Broderbund was willing to do it", overcoming his previous skepticism. Subsequently, he contacted North Dakota's Department of Public Instruction. In March 1987 he was able to secure a $100,000 grant from the state legislature which also liked the idea, and appropriated the money to help fund the project. The game interested North Dakota's Department of Public Instruction because of its narrow scope compared with the previous Carmen Sandiego titles and its ability to teach computer skills. North Dakota's Department of Public Instruction employee Chris Eriksmoen would later speak highly of the collaboration which he compared to that of Crosscountry North Dakota. By March 1988, Broderbund had not spoken openly about the project, but Classroom Computer Learning had been informed that there was to be an "imminent" contract between Broderbund and the North Dakota Database Committee (NDDC), and that the project would be available to North Dakota's educators within six to nine months. The inter-business deal would give Broderbund rights to sell the retail version while North Dakota's Department of Public Instruction would sell the school version.

The Broderbund team agreed to publish the game but required local expertise to create the clues and write the text. As a result, Nansen created the North Dakota Database Committee with teachers who had taught North Dakotan topics in the past. It spent the next two years compiling facts with the help of school districts across the state. The "educators-turned-game-developers" came up with the pranks, selected locations, researched clues, wrote informational text such as the teacher's manual, created Carmen's imposters, and sourced graphic material. Afterwards, Broderbund's designers took the team's work, and programmed and tested the game using the interface and structure of its previous Apple II Carmen Sandiego titles. They also developed graphics, a user manual, and packaging for the retail version. While there were restrictions on how much the North Dakotan team could deviate from the Carmen Sandiego template, local nuances were added including using four-wheel drive vehicles for travel and changing the words "criminals" to "imposters" and "crimes" to "pranks" to add "a touch of North Dakota nice". The previous games in the series (World and USA) had been released with almanacs to help the player solve the game's riddles and clues; the state of North Dakota did not have an almanac at the time, so the educators wrote one.

The project was completed in 1989 for the state's Department of Education to help mark North Dakota's 100th year of statehood. Ultimately, the entire grant was used for the project: $65,000 of the $100,000 was set aside by North Dakota's Department of Public Instruction to purchase an initial order of 2500 copies of the game from Broderbund; the balance of the money was used to pay the North Dakota Database Committee and for advertising and distribution costs. North Dakota's Department of Public Instruction aimed to recoup their costs by selling copies to North Dakotan schools while Broderbund planned to make a commercial version available.

== Release ==
The school version of the game packaged in its binder.

A January 1988 edition of It's Elementary revealed that Where in North Dakota is Carmen Sandiego? was to be distributed statewide in the coming summer in preparation for North Dakota's centennial celebration in 1989. However, the game was delayed until February 23, 1989, when an official news release was issued by Broderbund explaining that the game was being made available to both schools and the public. Before its official release, a copy of a field-testing version was accidentally leaked, and educators who mistakenly believed it was the finished product began calling and complaining.

The first day the game had retail distribution was March 18, 1989, in the Dakota Square Mall, where members of the NDDC demonstrated the software. At the time of its release, Broderbund was the third largest developer of commercial computer software in the United States, and its Carmen Sandiego software was especially popular both in schools and with the general public. World was used throughout Minot's 6th grade classes while U.S.A. was used in their 5th grade classes; the games were both popular in Fargo schools. Where in North Dakota is Carmen Sandiego? was targeted at fourth graders as the team believed this was the year when students began learning about their state. However, the teacher's guide suggested the game was suitable for students in grades four to twelve, for use either by an individual, a small group, or the entire class. Schools were encouraged to allow students to play the game before and after school, or when they completed their school work early. The game was not intended to be a replacement for the North Dakotan curriculum. Nansen saw it as an "enrichment activity" and a "motivating instructional tool" instead, merely one of many ways to get students interested in North Dakota. To promote the game, Nansen conducted seminars in schools across the state, encouraging teachers to incorporate the game, as well as other North Dakotan database games, into their curricula. North Dakota public school districts interested in the program were encouraged to call social studies director of the North Dakota Department of Public Instruction, Curt Eriksmoen, and before using it had to send at least one educator to one of Nansen's seminars. North Dakota's Department of Public Instruction would ship copies to qualifying schools across the state. Meanwhile, the public could order the game from Broderbund Software-Direct at a recommended retail price of $34.95, while educators could order teacher's guides for $10. There is no proof the game was ever officially sold through retail stores (although one complimentary retail copy was sent to the NDDC for their work on the project). The game was never officially published; only 10 prototype retail copies were ever produced, which were all mailed to educators involved in the project.

Other states approached Broderbund after the North Dakota title was released and were quoted millions instead of the $100,000 that funded the North Dakota game; none of these other projects came to fruition. According to Nansen, the biggest issue with these state-based projects was not the actual cost of producing them, but that Broderbund was forced to take their production team away from working on much more lucrative projects. By 2001 around 5,000 copies had been sold in North Dakota itself. The Video Game History Foundation described the program as "a hit in North Dakotan classrooms, but a flop for Broderbund".

== Reception ==
Why is Broderbund interested in tying up its talented development staff in a project with an audience relatively small in number? It could be that the company is planning to market a consumer version in stores throughout North Dakota (which would open up a much larger home market for the product). But at least one educator involved In the project claims that Broderbund is not closed to the idea of doing versions for other interested states.

— Holly Brady, Classroom Computer Learning (March 1988)

Nansen expected the game to be in every North Dakota school that had a computer system, and for it to be as popular throughout the state's education system as the World and U.S.A. versions. Berryman also saw the game's potential popularity outside North Dakota schools, commenting on its appeal to adults due to its agricultural, immigration, historical, and geographical content.

Where in North Dakota is Carmen Sandiego? ended up selling approximately 5,000 copies, mostly to North Dakota schools, and was very popular within the state. The game was used in the Grand Forks GATE program as well as in other classrooms, generally by fifth and sixth graders. However, very few copies made it outside of North Dakota; in these cases they were generally people with connections to North Dakota such as grandchildren of North Dakotan residents.

=== Contemporary reviews ===
InCider was puzzled by the specificity of the game. When listing the locations of various Carmen Sandiego games, it added that the imposter was also "in North Dakota, of all places". The Minot Daily News described the game as "special software". The Grand Forks Herald expressed surprise that there was "even" a North Dakotan game, though the writer commented that it succeeded in teaching geography in a palatable way and in developing research skills. Joseph P. Karwoski of Computerist! said the NDDC did a "great job" creating a "fantastic learning tool", and hoped other states followed suit. The game was worthy enough for a softkey to be published in Computerist!.

=== Modern reviews ===
California-based historian Frank Cifaldi described it as "probably the hardest" Carmen Sandiego game because it had clues based on obscure North Dakotan historical trivia, which are sometimes impossible to solve via an Internet search engine, and later described it as "very challenging". On the positive side, he felt the game was a "big hit, in terms of a fun story to tell". Kris Kerzman of Inforum deemed it "a fascinating piece of [North Dakota]'s history and video game history", and noted its existence could be puzzling even to fans of the Carmen Sandiego franchise. Cool987FM warned its readers of the difficulty in locating original floppy disks of the game. The Gamecola podcast described Where in North Dakota... as a "weird old PC game" that could be dug up for family game night. Atlas Obscura deemed the title as "little more than a barely remembered oddity" and akin to a "TV pilot that never went to series".

== Aftermath ==
North Dakota was the first state to adapt Carmen Sandiego into a state-specific video game. According to Education Technology News, the title was "picked up by several states and adapted to their needs". Though the game was heavily circulated in North Dakota school classrooms in the 1990s, it has become difficult to find in modern times. As North Dakota schools updated their computers, floppy disks became obsolete. This, coupled with the small production run, led to the title becoming rare. Cifaldi referred to it as "one of the rarest video games ever made", and openly encouraged citizens to unearth their copies of the game. A few school versions have survived; two are located at the North Dakota State Library while a copy was acquired by TanRu Nomad for his YouTube review. Nansen received an unprotected version from Broderbund after sales died off. By 2015 he and a group of students had digitized the game for play on JavaScript emulators.

Frank Cifaldi is a digital archivist, who became fascinated by the game after being shocked by its existence when browsing Wikipedia entries on Carmen Sandiego titles. After conversing with game designer and collector Mike Mika, he discovered that although Mika apparently had every Carmen Sandiego game, he did not have this entry; Mika said its existence was "blowing his mind" since the project sounded like a joke and made no sense. Cifaldi also discovered that Where in North Dakota... was the only Carmen Sandiego game not to be represented in the National Museum of Play's Broderbund Software Collection. In January 2015, Cifaldi began conversing with Nansen after posting on Twitter requesting information about the game. As Nansen was recently retired, he offered to round up all the information on the obscure game and make it available; meanwhile Cifaldi offered to write articles using the material.

In anticipation of the game's upcoming digital archive, Cifaldi visited Nansen in Minot with a film crew from June 13–15, 2016. He interviewed those who worked on the project and recorded various locations used in the game. Valuable material such as photographs and internal documentation was also recovered (such as the authentic Carmen's North Dakota Almanac). Handwritten notes from the NDDC, messages between the developers and Broderbund, classroom worksheet extensions, imagery of development, various builds of the game during its evolution, and the manual were all recovered. During this visit, Nansen gave Cifaldi one of only three known surviving versions of the game boxed for retail sale. This version differed from the version that was sold to schools and was sold only through the Broderbund mail-order catalog. This meeting was filmed for S1E6 of the Redbull TV series Screenland, entitled "Eight-Bit Archaeologists".

The game was imaged and made available online, providing Cifaldi with a raw rip of the unused version. Players need to use an Apple II emulator or write onto old floppy disks and play it on an Apple II. Cifaldi's copy was later sent to the National Museum of Play to supplement other Carmen Sandiego materials donated to the museum by Broderbund founder Doug Carlston in 2014. Jon-Paul Dyson, the director of the International Center for the History of Electronic Games at the National Museum of Play, personally thanked Cifaldi for his endeavours. In July 2016, the Apple II-focused KansasFest featured a Where in North Dakota is Carmen Sandiego? contest.

Cifaldi has since added his work to his new initiative Video Game History Foundation. It aims to preserve the video game industry's lost assets, such as Penn and Teller's Smoke and Mirrors. To help celebrate the launch of the foundation, IGN partnered to show off some of their recovered games, including Where in North Dakota... via a live stream. A playable version of the game was featured at the debut Retro Play area at the three-day GDC 2017 expo (along with Penn & Teller's Smoke and Mirrors, Bound High!, Sound Fantasy, and Alter Ego). The Video Game History Foundation, which was hosting the exhibit, decided to include the clue guide almanac, which had been successfully preserved despite years in a fourth-grade classroom, for the public to use. Ultimately four participants attempted the game and none were successful in catching Carmen. In April 2018, an original staged reading with the game's namesake was performed at AwesomeCon in Washington, DC.
