= Carmen Sandiego Word Detective =

1997 video game

- Developer: Broderbund
- Publisher: Broderbund
- Series: Carmen Sandiego
- Platforms: Mac OS, Windows
- Release: 1997
- Genre: Educational
- Mode: Single-player

Carmen Sandiego Word Detective is an educational video game in the Carmen Sandiego franchise which was released in 1997. The plot of the game sees Carmen Sandiego inventing a machine called the Babble-On Machine, and the player, in the role of Agent 13, thwarting her plans by freeing the other ACME agents, all of whom have been captured by Carmen. The title is very similar in format to Carmen Sandiego Math Detective, which was released a year later.

== Gameplay and plot ==
The intro to this "spy adventure" starts off with Agent 12 (Ann Tickwittee) searching for Acme agents who have gone missing. Under the orders of ACME secret agent Chase Devineaux, she discovers Carmen's hideout, a large tower called the Tower of Babble, which suddenly emerges from underneath her. She realizes too late it was a trap, and a trap door opens beneath her, leading her into the tower. She reaches out to Chase, but gets captured, finding herself trapped in a machine and starting to babble. Carmen enters and explains that she has invented a "Babble-On" machine that turns speech into gibberish, having already captured the previous eleven agents. She reveals her grand plan to achieve world illiteracy. She then sends the keys to the Babble-One machine to her henchmen. The player takes the role of Agent 13, who has just been called onto the case by Chase. Agent 13 must free all twelve captured agents in order to stop Carmen's plan. To free each agent, the player uses the CyberCom 2000 to travel between a number of henchmen hideouts via teleportation to find passwords, narrowly avoiding being caught by the villains. The player uncovers these passwords by completing language problems (Spellanyzer, Fusion Chamber, MicroPix, Code Breaker, and Power Pack) testing the player's vocabulary, grammar, and spelling.

After finding enough passwords, the player can unlock a container in one of the hideouts to get a key needed to free the agents. After obtaining a key, a villain tries to attack the player, but they manage to escape in time. Throughout the game, each agent gives the player a fragment of Babble-On's password before leaving. The player also receive emails, some of them come with videos, from Chase and Carmen at some points. After freeing all the agents, the player is able to trigger a self-destruct sequence by entering the password fragments in a cohesive sentence. As Carmen activates the machine, she finds that it is no longer operational. Vowing revenge, Carmen and the player escape the building as it collapses and Chase finds her hat amongst the rubble, commenting "until we meet again Carmen" before flying away on a hi-tech jetpack.

The game comes with many bonus features, including three levels of difficulty, an electronic dictionary, 10,000 spelling words, customizable spelling lists, 50 spelling rules, and an on-screen progress reports. The School Edition of the game came with a three-ring binder to hold the software, a User's Guide, a custom-developed Teacher's Guide, and a resource book Spelling Puzzles from the Usborne English Skills series.

== Development ==
=== Background ===
By 1996, the consumer software market had become hugely competitive. Broderbund was forced to cut their prices, and were also affected by the delay of the sequel to Myst which they were to publish. Their stock dropped as low as $17.75 a share in 1997. In an effort to restructure, packaged goods veteran Joseph P. Durrett was named as Broderbund CEO who put in control measures and a management structure focused on the bottom line. In his words: "The days of flexible budgets and free spending were quickly replaced by a cost consciousness that put every creative decision under scrutiny". For the first time in Broderbund history, employees were pressured to complete projects using tighter deadlines and smaller budgets. In addition to squeezed margins, Broderbund was frustrated that their own success had attracted many competitors into the market. Despite flashy marketing, these were often inferior products demanding a high price. There was a fear that parents, upset by the wasted purchase, would become more sceptical about purchasing computer games in the future.

=== Word Workshop and conception ===
According to Laurie Strand, Vice president of Broderbund, Carmen Sandiego Word Detective "began as an educational game called "Word Workshop", a language-learning companion to the company's popular "Math Workshop [released in 1994]"". The game had undergone an intense six months of design and development and was near completion, when management approached the team and ordered that the game be redesigned as a line extension of the Carmen Sandiego franchise to improve its chance in the stores where shelf space was being fought over. Mrs Strand called the team into the room and explained they had to redo all the game's assets in the context of Carmen Sandiego, which they proceeded to do without objection. The production manager rallied the creative team for the first meeting after the design change. Eight staffers and outside contractors, consisting of artists, writers, software designers and programmers met to brainstorm a narrative that would allow the game to fit into the franchise. Someone suggested that Carmen steal the unstealable - language - who would scramble words that the player would have to solve to foil her plan. A freelance writer who was brought in for the meeting suggested introducing a new secret agent character who had a checkered past but ultimately helped the player, which was incorporated.

=== Development and release ===
Once the storyline was in place, the production manager drew up a mission statement and gave assignments to the team, including writing the script and creating the audiovisual assets. Someone suggested sponsoring a contest on America Online to name the new character, an approach that eventually led to him being called 'Chase Devineaux'. The artists began drawing the characters and 20 contract animators from around the United States were hired to assist with the time-consuming task. A design document was drawn up to ensure a cohesiveness aesthetic across the various locations the player can visit. The game's structure broke away from the template established in previous entries within the franchise, and therefore new software code had to be written. To accommodate the game's 8 through 14 age range, levels of difficulty were offered for players to advance through. During production, educational content was reviewed by a panel of teachers who served as advisers. Prototypes were built at each step along the development process, and two-hour meetings were held each week to chart the game's progress. The title went into full production within six months, which was about a third the usual time. While the employees were not paid royalties, they were given competitive salaries and bonuses and made the game from their passion in the art and science of gaming to produce high-quality software. The game was released late 1997.

=== Aftermath ===
Broderbund at the time prided itself on having a "very vocal and opinionated culture" which encouraged team-based collaboration, with individuals having "spirited and heated discussions" about aspects of development. Strand appreciated that her team had a shared vision and an ability to respect each other's disciplines, with the team feeling creatively fulfilled by bringing characters from their childhood to life in a computer game. Harry Wilker, senior vice president for product development at Broderbund, commented that the goal was only able to reached through everyone following a singular design vision, for the person with that vision to be in control, and by hiring talent over self-aggrandizing types.

== Reception ==
Reception

Awards
Publication	Award
Codie award	1998 - Best Home Education for Pre-Teens
Academy of Interactive Arts & Sciences	1998 - PC Skills Building Title of the Year
Parents' Choice Awards	1998 Parents' Choice Gold Award

Learning Village felt that the five minigames "cover...an excellent range of basic and important skills in language arts [and are] visually engaging", with the game offering both a sleuthing and chase experience. MultiMedia Schools noted the title's instructional allowed it to produce "significant growth" in students and improve their attitude toward language arts. PC Mag noted the game favors education over detailed graphics, animation, and action, though added it was able to frame tedious drills within an engaging setting. Literacy for Children in an Information Age noted the title's ability to teach parts of speech, sentence structure, punctuation, using words in context, spelling rules, word definitions, and dictionary skills. Ann Orr of Working Mother recommended the software as one of the best computer game "homework helpers" of 1998, noting the playful way it expands vocabularies. Technological Horizons In Education described he game's interface as "intuitive and highly imaginative". THE Journal wrote that "the interface, like all Carmen Sandiego titles, is intuitive and highly imaginative, setting just the right atmosphere for a would-be detective". Technology & Learning awarded Word Detective in the language arts category, noting it "makes usually dry grammatical information intriguing, and that it is a great accompaniment to a language arts program".

The game won the 1998 Codie award for Best Home Education for Pre-Teens.
