= Carmen Sandiego Day =

Days in American Schools first held in 1988

Carmen Sandiego Days (also known as Carmen Days) have been popular across United States schools since they were first held in 1988. Inspired by the Carmen Sandiego franchise, these days see schools hold week-long Carmen Sandiego-themed events, aided by packs and prizes originally provided by Broderbund, and later by the franchises' subsequent owners after The Learning Company's acquisition of Broderbund in 1998. The 30th Carmen Sandiego Day took place on January 8, 2018.

== History ==
When Where in the World Is Carmen Sandiego? was released in 1985, it wasn't an immediate success. It largely found its feet thanks to Apple's Apple Unified School System and Apple's Education Purchase Program, which guaranteed a "nationwide computer-in-the-classroom infrastructure" that had an unprecedented and surreptitious side effect for Carmen Sandiego. Cathy Carlston and Janese Swanson, members of Broderbund's Educational Task Force, leveraged this by creating "Carmen Days", in which teachers and students would dress up as characters from the series, and play Carmen Sandiego video games.

March 4, 1988 saw the very first Carmen Sandiego Day take place in Bluffton, Indiana; it was organised by Jon Bennett of Eastside Elementary School. Broderbund helped out with the event by providing Carmen Sandiego content and a plan to follow. Other schools began holding the days, and Broderbund set up a streamlined system for them to purchase the kit. SAGE students held a Carmen Sandiego Day on November 16, 1990 Valen Maylard created an idea packet for the day entitled "Carmen Sandiego Is in Your Classroom", which incorporated the Carmen Day kit into the proceedings as supplementary material. Seventh- and eighth-grade students of Little Flower School celebrated the day in 1993, which included them playing the video game over 8 weeks in a contest for who could complete the most cases .. They also dressed up as a character from the series and delivered a presentation on them. An event was held at Winding Creek on April 10, 2002.

To celebrate the 30th anniversary of the first Carmen Sandiego Day, the franchise is encouraging schools across the country to creating their own classroom events dedicated to cultural awareness and inquiry-based learning on January 8, 2019. In a live event from 10:30-11:30 AM EST, the show will broadcast a live interview with the voice of Carmen, Gina Rodriguez. It will also show the trailer and clips from the upcoming Netflix show. Finally, students will be selected to compete in a geography.history gameshow entitled Geo Game Show. The live broadcast will be done via dadeschools.tv. In addition, HMH created quizzes and activities for the Day, including Carmen's Geo Handbook and Carmen Quiz Show.

== Description ==
=== Schools ===
The exact description of a day varies with the event. In the very first Carmen Sandiego Day, students went on a linguistic, artistic, musical, and geographical tour through locations where Carmen's crooks hid, on the way learning about culture via their favourite sports and chosen cuisines. The first annual Carmen Sandiego Day in Charlotte took place on February 15, 1993, and all 4–6th graders in public, private and parochial schools were asked to participate in the event. Carmen Sandiego Day was recommended as a way to get educators, students and community members to turn into technology users and supporters. In a 1992 event, children explained the computer program to their parents, brought food from different parts of the world, had homerooms compete in the Math Super Bowl competition, and a Media Center containing a Carmen theater, art exhibits, Spanish exhibits, gifted-talented exhibits and hobbies-sports-careers exhibits.

=== Broderbund ===
To help with the events, Broderbund traditionally contributes in various ways. They published sample news releases and a radio script, as well as participation certificates for the students. They also created a four-week planning guide that led up to the actual events. In some cases, Broderbund even sent an actress dressed up as Carmen Sandiego by helicopter herself to schools who called in advance. A system was implemented whereby students could call into the fictional Acme Detective Agency (actual Broderbund headquarters) and talk to the Chief (played by franchise creators Gene Portwood or Lauren Elliott). While they originally gave away the kits for free, due to the success of the program they began charging $10 for shipping and handling. Broderbund added a contest element to the days as Broderbund would provide a pack with shirts, folders, contest suggestions, stickers, and prizes; this became a favourable component for schools. The kit was made available alongside the other two educational support packages, released due to the "overwhelming acceptance" of the series: School editions and Lab Pack editions. The latter two, plus Carmen Day sequels, were published by Broderbund due to the "overwhelming demand".

== Reception ==
The Carmen Sandiego kit was distributed to over 7000 schools across the United States, and the project was covered in Time magazine. Jon Bennet, who had organised the first Carmen Sandiego Day, received the Quality Recognition Award for technology innovation at a State Board of Education meeting for his Carmen Sandiego Day concept. In 2001, Lauren Elliott would retroactively assess that "[Carmen Days] were a kick ... and successful".

Beverly Cunningham, SAGE teacher at Mountain Valley Elementary, commented: "Carmen Sandiego Day is an excellent example of how computer programs can be used innovatively to enrich traditional subjects and increase student involvement and motivation". A November 1991 issue of Amiga News noted that the Carmen Sandiego franchise had "achieved great success" in schools thanks to the establishment of this ongoing event. Commodore Magazine wrote that the Carmen Day packs were "worth it".

The success of Carmen Days led to schools from many states asking Broderbund to make state-specific versions of their games to appeal to the state and fit into their Carmen Days. Broderbund only attempted this once, with the prototype Where in North Dakota Is Carmen Sandiego?; the game sold around 5,000 copies but its popularity was contained with North Dakota.
