= Carmen Sandiego in Japan =

1989 video game

- Developer: Broderbund Japan
- Publisher: Broderbund Japan
- Platform: PC-98
- Release: November 21, 1989
- Genres: Adventure, educational

Carmen Sandiego in Japan – Hannin Sagashite Nihon Zenkoku (Japanese: カルメン サンディエゴ イン ジャパン) is a 1989 spin-off entry in the Carmen Sandiego franchise. It was developed and published by Broderbund Japan on two floppy disks for the NEC PC-9801 Series 525in. The title functions as both an adventure game where players chase and capture Carmen, and an educational game where players learn about geography and history of Japan. The title was released on November 21, 1989, one of the few titles released under the Broderbund Japan brand that year alongside tabletop Shufflepuck Café (June 11) and shooter Wings of Fury (September).

== Development ==
In Japan, Where in the World (1985) was a success, released on PC98, FM Towns, and PC engine; this new title was created specifically for the Japanese market. The game was developed around the same time as Where in Time was being developed in the United States, and its purpose was to help local students study Japanese history and geography. The game featured the template of Where in the World with some changed data.

== Gameplay and plot ==
As with other games in the series, Japan sees the player follow clues in locations around Japan to track down Carmen's henchmen and eventually Carmen herself. Players require a correct warrant to successfully arrest the perpetrator.

== Critical reception ==
Eco News noted that the game is realistic in the sense that the number of days it takes to track the thief changes as the travel distance increases; while noting the software is difficult for elementary school students with little knowledge of geography, the magazine argued it was targeted toward junior high students.
