= Carmen Sandiego's ThinkQuick Challenge =

1999 video game

- Developer: The Learning Company
- Publisher: The Learning Company
- Series: Carmen Sandiego
- Engine: Mohawk
- Platforms: Mac OS, Windows
- Release: NA: June 1, 1999
- Genre: Educational
- Modes: Single-player, multiplayer

Carmen Sandiego's ThinkQuick Challenge (sometimes referred to as Carmen Sandiego's Think Quick Challenge) is a "game show-themed" edutainment computer game for kids ages 8–12 (although PC Mac suggests it is suitable for ages 10 and up). The title, which is a part of the Carmen Sandiego franchise, was released by The Learning Company on June 1, 1999. It can be played by up to 4 players, and runs on the Mohawk engine.

== Development ==
The 1000 questions over 7 subjects in the game were written and developed by teachers. The game was first to give Carmen Sandiego players a multiplayer option. The title reviews curriculum for fourth- through sixth-graders.

There was a promotion where if players picked up their copy from CompUSA8, they would be entered into a draw with the chance to win Carmen Sandiego prizes. There was also a competition called "2000 TECHNOLOGY & LEARNING Teacher of the Year Awards program", with Learning Company as one of the sponsors and offering copies of the game as prizes for state winners.

== Plot ==
Carmen Sandiego and her six Master Thieves (Gnash, Madame Le Zaarde, Snarla Swing, Dr. Depth, Count Hypno, and Jane Reaction) have sent KnowBots (SynicBot, HALieBot, Pure-EBot, BruiserBot, DimBot, and Touchy-FezlyBot) to steal the world of its data and information from various texts. In response Acme Agent Chase Devineaux recruits additional agents to counter this worldwide threat. Carmen Sandiego, eager for a challenge awaits the agents.

There is no actual end to the game, as after the defeat and capture of Carmen's minions, the game will just restart with them free as if the previous events never happened.

== Gameplay ==
The object of the game is to get past Carmen's KnowBots and correctly answer questions to capture Carmen's Master Thieves. At the beginning of each mission, Chase Devineaux, the ACME Detective Agency's top agent will describes the suspect and the vital stolen knowledge. There are three difficulty levels, that cater for three age groups respectively and start players with a certain number of Energy Points. Up to four players or teams can play.

Players outwit KnowBots in a game-show type competition. In a regular game, players visit two locations, each with two KnowBots, alternating every three questions. Each KnowBot is knowledgeable in different subject areas: History, Geography, Math, Crime scene (which is similar to a memory game), English, Life Science, Physical Science, or Art and Music. If the player(s) answer correctly, they gain a certain number of Knowledge Points dependent on the type of question being asked (For example, Multipick questions are worth 950 Knowledge Points, and Rapid Fire Sort questions are worth 200 Knowledge Points each). If they get a question incorrect, they lose one point of Capture Energy, which is essential to the capture of the Master Thief. Once at the Master Thief's hideout, the player needs to solve a unique puzzle to enter. The player with the most Capture Energy will have the opportunity to capture the thief, but if there is a tie in Capture Energy, the player with the most Knowledge Points will have the opportunity to capture the thief.

Players and school teachers also have the option to create their own questions sets of up to 50 questions using Multipick, YinYang (True/False), Sequencer, Matchmaker, and Gridlock (Finding all the answers in a grid).

== Critical reception ==
In a review of a package entitled Adventure Workshop: 4th-6th Grade which featured the games The ClueFinders Reading Adventures Ages 9-12, Carmen Sandiego's ThinkQuick Challenge, and Super Solvers Mission: T.H.I.N.K., Hilary Williams of AllGame said that it is "one of those rare compilations where all of the included titles are superb", adding that ThinkQuick was "another great [Carmen] game that will interest older kids due to its international espionage theme" and that the game "retains the educational value of previous titles in the series, without losing entertainment value". Newsday commented "[the game is] great, because four kids can play it together on the computer, and it has more than 1,000 questions in seven subject areas, so you are never bored". SuperKids praised the "superb graphics", "intricate storyline", and gameplay that would "amaze and delight" Carmen Sandiego fans, though it may prove tiresome for those who had become tired of the quiz-based gaming genre. Infotech said it was a gaming title of interest. ThinkQuick was selected as one of the games offered for this project where games were donated to the Harmony Public Library for students' learning. Teacher Librarian deemed it "another Carmen Sandiego hit" and a "CD-ROM title of interest". The Daily Herald wrote that the "high-qualify, easy-to-use" title "shows why [the Carmen Sandiego] franchise has been so successful", praising the gameplay mechanic whereby players are alternating between competing in a trivia contest and cooperatively catching Carmen's crooks. Poughkeepsie Journal thought the game bore similarities to the fast-paced quiz game You Don't Know Jack, and thought the kids who have grown weary of the saccharine "Good job" would "love the edgy attitude of a [KnowBot] challenger who snaps" quips like "Enjoy your little victory, Blue. It won't last". The Cincinnati Enquirer noted that this game saw a costume change from Carmen Sandiego's iconic red dress to a black catsuit. The Straits Times thought the game was "exciting and challenging".

In a negative analysis, Robin Ray of the Boston Herald commented that ThinkQuick was part of a growing trend of gaming franchises in which previous titles which "could wholeheartedly [be] recommend[ed]", "[were not] a complete waste of time", and "[were] near-perfect combination of fun and learning" contrasted greatly with the new releases which instead "cause...slow burn". She said "this is not Think Quick, this is Spit Quick". Home Computer Buying Guide said the game had a weaker and less interesting theme than previous Carmen Sandiego titles. Anne Sushko of The Book Report recommended the game as "well developed and of high interest", though noted that it was not compatible with Windows NT. The Boston Herald gave the game a scathing review, writing that the game has lost the girl customer, that the questions are "random, narrow, [and] boring", and that "the Knowbots sneeringly insult you if you give an incorrect answer", concluding that whoever designed the game "should be asked to clear off his or her hard drive".
