= Melissa Wiley =

American writer

- Born: Melissa Anne Peterson; December 17, 1968 (age 57)
- Occupations: Writer, Editor
- Spouse: Scott Peterson
- Writing career
- Notable works: The Martha Years; The Charlotte Years

Melissa Anne Peterson (born December 17, 1968), known by her pen name Melissa Wiley, is an author of children's books, known especially for two book series about Laura Ingalls Wilder's ancestors: The Martha Years and The Charlotte Years. She is a contributing writer at Wired.com's GeekMom blog and co-writes a webcomic with her husband, Scott Peterson, and illustrator Chris Gugliotti.

== Personal life ==
Wiley resides in Portland, Oregon with her husband, comic book editor and author Scott Peterson, and six children. One of her sons (born December 9, 2003) has hearing loss. Her oldest daughter (born June 7, 1995) had leukemia, but recovered. She is a stay-at-home mom and homeschools her children.

== Books ==
=== Nonfiction ===
- Antlers in Space and Other Common Phenomena (Split/Lip Press, 2017)
- Skull Cathedral: A Vestigial Anatomy (Autumn House Press, 2020)

=== Fiction ===
- Anastasia: Together in Paris (Golden Books, 1997, as Melissa Peterson)
- Hanna's Christmas (HarperFestival, 2001, as Melissa Peterson)
- Fox and Crow Are Not Friends (Random House, 2012)
- The Prairie Thief (Margaret K. McElderry Books, 2012)
- Inch and Roly Make a Wish (Simon Spotlight, 2012)
- Inch and Roly and the Very Small Hiding Place (Simon Spotlight, 2013)
- Inch and Roly and the Sunny Day Scare (Simon Spotlight, 2013)
- The Nerviest Girl in the World (Knopf, 2020)

Little House: The Martha Years
Published by HarperCollins.

1. Little House in the Highlands (1999)
2. The Far Side of the Loch (2000)
3. Down to the Bonny Glen (2001)
4. Beyond the Heather Hills (2003)

Little House: The Charlotte Years
Published by HarperCollins.

1. Little House by Boston Bay (1999)
2. On Tide Mill Lane (2001)
3. The Road from Roxbury (2002)
4. Across the Puddingstone Dam (2004)

Carmen Sandiego Mysteries
Published by HarperCollins and credited to Melissa Peterson.

- Hasta la Vista, Blarney (1997)
- The Cocoa Commotion (1997)
