= Where in the U.S.A. Is Carmen Sandiego? (1986 video game) =

1986 video game

- Apple II cover art
- Developer: Broderbund
- Publisher: Broderbund
- Series: Carmen Sandiego
- Platforms: Apple II, Commodore 64, Apple IIGS, Amiga, MS-DOS, Mac
- Release: 1986: Apple II, MS-DOS; 1987: C64; 1989: Amiga, GS, Mac
- Genre: Educational
- Mode: Single-player

Where in the U.S.A. Is Carmen Sandiego? is an educational video game released by Broderbund in 1986 and is part of the Carmen Sandiego series. The game is a sequel to 1985's Where in the World Is Carmen Sandiego?. A deluxe version with updated graphics and interface was released in 1992 and a remade version was released in 1996. The goal of the game is to track Carmen Sandiego's henchmen across the United States, arrest them, and ultimately arrest Carmen herself. The game received generally positive reviews but some critics compared it unfavorably with its predecessor game, which had a global perspective.

== Development ==
Where in the U.S.A. Is Carmen Sandiego?, which focuses on United States geography, was produced as a sequel to Where in the World Is Carmen Sandiego? due to the success of the previous game. It became the second entry in the Carmen Sandiego franchise and would be followed by Where in Europe Is Carmen Sandiego? in 1988. Carmen Sandiego co-developer Doug Carlston followed a design philosophy that avoided explicit education. He wanted the game to feel like an explorational detective mystery that surreptitiously educated players on facts and figures while they chased and tried to capture Carmen, preventing the young audience from dismissing the game as boring or insincere.

A "VGA enhanced version" edition of the game was released in 1989. A "Deluxe" expansion pack version was released in 1992, on hybrid Windows/Macintosh in 1994, and on Macintosh in 1996. The deluxe extended edition, an "upgrade" of the 1985 version, was released on CD-ROM for DOS and Macintosh in 1992, and a version for Microsoft Windows was released in 1994. The deluxe version of the game featured additional animation and a reworked interface from the 1985 version.

A rebooted version of the game was released in 1996; this version featured Lynne Thigpen in the role of The Chief, which she originated in the 1991–1996 televised game show Where in the World Is Carmen Sandiego?. There was also a board game adaption created by University Games titled Where in the USA is Carmen Sandiego? The Geography Mystery Game. The Carmen Sandiego franchise that began with World and U.S.A. continued into the 21st century; the latest video game entry is the 2015 title Carmen Sandiego Returns, and the fourth television series (after World, Earth, and Time) premiered on Netflix in 2019.

== Gameplay and plot ==
Original DOS version screenshot

The gameplay is similar to that of its predecessor, Where in the World Is Carmen Sandiego?. The goal of the game is to track Carmen's henchmen across the United States, arrest them, and ultimately arrest Carmen Sandiego, who has escaped from a European prison and has gone to the US to assemble a gang of V.I.L.E. members to steal the country's treasures.

The player, an agent of ACME Detective Agency, must gather information on the suspect and use it to obtain a warrant to reduce the potential suspects to one of the V.I.L.E. members in the database. The player must then track the criminal to the final destination and make an arrest. The player advances in rank throughout the game, eventually reaching the level of Super Sleuth. The player captures 16 of Carmen's crooks before having a chance to arrest her.

The main screen interface is divided into four sections showing the day, time, and location; textual information, an image from the current city, and the available actions. The game was supplied with a special copy of Fodor's USA encyclopedia as a reference guide and a travel guide book. The deluxe version of the game includes more than 50 digitized photographs, numerous state topographical maps, digitized sounds, and music.

== Characters ==
- The Chief - the unseen head of the ACME Detective Agency sends briefings to the player as a case begins.
- Carmen Sandiego - former secret agent turned master thief and leader of the Villain's International League of Evil (V.I.L.E.), her gang of criminals.
- Sven Galli
- Gypsy Rose Lasagna
- B.B.D. O'Brien
- Sheriff Paul Drive
- Ken Hartley Reed
- Titus Canby
- Mylar Naugahyde
- Brenda & Cobina Vanderbilt
- Karl La Fong
- Polly Esther Fabrique
- Heidi Gosikh
- Venus H. Pencil
- Wendy Pauper
- Alexander Graham Edison
- Benjamin Hana

== Reception ==
Where in the USA is Carmen Sandiego? Deluxe
- Developer: Broderbund
- Publisher: Broderbund
- Series: Carmen Sandiego
- Platforms: MS-DOS, Mac OS, Windows
- Release: 1992
- Genre: Educational
- Mode: Single-player

Critics gave Where in the USA Is Carmen Sandiego? positive reviews, although many reviews negatively compared it with its predecessor. The smaller scope of Where in the U.S.A.... may have reduced its relevance for potential players who lived outside the United States.

In 1987, Computer Gaming World complimented the game as a valuable tool for teaching geography, reference book use, map reading, and deductive reasoning. Compute! Gazette said the "educational and challenging" work was "so intriguing that players will be drawn to it again and again, learning a little more about logic, common sense, and U.S. geography each time". The New York Times' Thomas L. Friedman described the game as "a wonderful geography-teaching tool". Gregg Keizer of Compute! said the game is "redeeming" when compared with the "sociopathic" Task Force, while Compute!'s Warren Buckleitner called it an "outstanding" and "excellent" example of edutainment. Judith Kilbury-Cobb of Info 30 gave the game a rating of 4.5 stars, writing that it is so "engrossing" players would not realize they were learning.

Macworld reviewed the Macintosh version of Where in the USA Is Carmen Sandiego?, calling it a "lively and challenging way to practice map-reading skills ... Once again Broderbund has produced a learning tool that is not only educational but also loads of fun". Macworld criticized the key-disk copy protection, which requires one of the game disks to be inserted even if the game is installed.

Phil Campbell of Australian Commodore and Amiga Review described aspects of the game as "fun", "delightful", and "effective", while calling the game a worthy sequel to Where in the World Is Carmen Sandiego?. The House of Games gave the title a score of 7/10, writing that it plays the same as its predecessor, questioning its appeal to those outside of the United States, and giving it a lower score than World for this reason. The Journal News said the game is one of the more popular spin-offs from Where in the World Is Carmen Sandiego?. Arizona Republic said the CD-ROM version of the game is a "sure winner". Chicago Tribune wrote that the game is "along the same lines of play" as World.

Jean Donham van Deusen, co-author of Teaching With Computers: A New Menu for the Nineties, ranked the program highly, praised its ability to foster social interaction between players, and wrote that the game overcomes a misconception about computer playing being a solitary activity and that with Where in the USA Is Carmen Sandiego?, the player is in charge of the experience. St. Louis Post-Dispatch wrote that the game offers a fun way for players to learn about United States geography. The Tennessean said the game's appeal was age-based and that it was unlikely that children who were ten or younger would enjoy the game's challenges. The Daily Tar Heel noted the game's importance in "a society where most pupils can't identify their home state on a map".

=== Commercial performance ===
Where in the U.S.A. Is Carmen Sandiego? was the fifth (August 20 through September 16, 1989) and fourth (June 24 through July 21, 1990) best-selling home-learning software according to a COMPUTEI's Hotware list conducted by Egghead Discount Software. The list was on retail sales of Apple II, Macintosh, and IBM software from Egghead stores in the United States and Canada.
