= Where on Google Earth is Carmen Sandiego? =

Google Earth video games

Where on Google Earth is Carmen Sandiego? was a series of three video games utilising Google Earth released as tie-ins to the animated series released in the same year. To develop the series, Houghton Mifflin Harcourt partnered with Google. The games utilize the Google Earth software, and runs as an add-on that can be played by clicking the icon of Carmen Sandiego. The game is played by Google's Chrome web browser on a PC, or with the Google Earth app on iOS and Android devices. It aims to be a reimagining of the original 1985 video game, using Google Earth.

== Development ==
The game was born from a pitch from the Google team called Brand Studio Experiments Group, which aims to find novel or innovative ways to use Google technology. Some of the team's background in game development led to game-related pitches. Noting that Google Earth had been used to host guided tours and geo quizzes, they felt it would be an ideal tool to house a geography game, and Creative Engineer JK Kafalas pitched Carmen Sandiego due to an affection for the series growing up.

The team began working on a demo in the Summer of 2017. They taught themselves Keyhole Markup Language, and pulled some graphics from YouTube Let's Plays of the Super Nintendo edition. The demo received an "overwhelmingly positive" responsive from Google Earth staff, who agreed to pursue it. The team pitched it to Houghton Mifflin Harcourt (HMH) - the current rights holders - in early 2018, just as they were finishing up with their relaunch of the Carmen Sandiego franchise featuring an animated series, a live-action film, books, in-school outreach. For this reason they were very enthusiastic. HMH divulged that the new incarnation of Carmen would be as a "roguish heroine, rather than the criminal mastermind" that players knew her as, and encouraged them to add this narrative to their games. Other than that, they were very flexible, and contributed with resources and design.

== Games ==
1. Carmen Sandiego: The Crown Jewels Caper
2. Carmen Sandiego: The Tutankhamun's Mask Caper
3. Carmen Sandiego: The Keys to the Kremlin Caper

== Reception ==
The Verge thought the "pixel art is charming", though it missed the lack of sound. Time felt the games were evidence that the "immortal Carmen Sandiego is still accessible for the next generation of kids". According to Business Insider, the series' announcement "triggered waves of nostalgia".

The games won the award for "Family & Kids" at the 2020 Webby Awards.
