= Where in the World of Music Is Carmen Sandiego? =

Concert flyer for Where in the World of Music is Carmen Sandiego?: The Notable Case of the Missing Pyramid (an alternate spelling of The Case of the Missing Pyramids).

Where in the World of Music Is Carmen Sandiego? is a concert series developed by Gary Sheldon. It consists of three concerts: The Case of the Missing Concert Hall, The Case of the Missing Bells, and The Case of the Missing Pyramids. The annual family concerts are based on the popular Carmen Sandiego video game Where In The World, and the subsequent franchise. Sheldon has "taken [the show] to orchestras throughout America". Bobby Weinapple, who starred as Inspector Clue-Not in the shows, still works with singers of all kinds at Seydways Studios in San Francisco.

According to Sandpoint, Idaho, a unique installment of the "interactive presentation" concert series entitled The Case of the Missing Planet was performed on Aug. 6 2000, "featuring the Spokane Symphony Orchestra. The premise was: "With the help of children in the audience, Conductor Gary Sheldon and Inspector "Clue-not" discover musical clues from Strauss to Mozart which lead to different parts of the Solar System. The performance is both entertaining and educational." In Jacksonville, The Case of the Missing Concert Hall was performed as part of the "Symphony Matinee Series".

The musical concerts were devised by music director of California's Marin Symphony, Gary Sheldon (aka Maestro Sheldonovitch), who "came up with the idea of combining the Carmen Sandiego format with an orchestra concert". The Spokesman noted "The blend of “Carmen Sandiego” with symphony music fits seamlessly into the formula devised by Stefan Kozinski in 1981."

== Development ==
Gary Sheldon "came up with the idea of combining the Carmen Sandiego format with an orchestra concert", a couple of years before 1999. From that point until 1999, he came up with 3 different shows for his "Where in the World of Music Is Carmen Sandiego?" series. His shows "require some audience participation".

In 1995, The Lancaster Festival Orchestra performed one of the concerts entitled "The Case of the Missing Concert Hall". It featured Gary Sheldon as Conductor and Senior Investigator and Bobby Weinapple as Inspector Clue-not. Dudley Moore and Ben Vereen were guest artists, and Jon Kimura Parker was featured classical artist. The show was performed at the Arlene Schnitzer Concert Hall in Portland, Oregon, and opened the 2001-2002 Oregon Symphony Kids Concert series. Sheldon served as guest conductor for a 2003 performance at the Grand Opera House.

"The Case of the Missing Bells" was performed at Spokane Opera House in Spokane, Washington in March 1998 as part of the “SymFunnies” family concert, and in Fall 2010 at Norwich Historical Society in Norwich, Connecticut. It is a "kid-friendly concert" This program is "designed to teach children about music and geography in an entertaining way". It is a "one-hour performance [which] teaches students a bit about classical music and the instruments that make up an orchestra".

This SymFunnies family concert was also conducted by Gary Sheldon, who led the Spokane Symphony in the Opera House in 1999 for its premiere. Bobby Weinapple also played Inspector Clue-Not in "The Case of the Missing Pyramids"

== Plot ==
Audience members follow musical clues to help catch Carmen Sandiego.

- In The Case Of The Missing Concert Hall, Inspector Clue-Not follows clues in order to find Carmen. There are some red herrings along the way, and while the case is solved and the stolen item returned, Carmen escapes again. It is a "musical chase around the world...using clues from orchestral works", in order to hunt down the whereabouts of Carnegie Hall.
- In The Case of the Missing Bells, "Carmen has stolen the Liberty Bell right before your orchestra is to perform at the International Peace Concert in Philadelphia [in] a musical trip around the world [which] spotlights soloists throughout the orchestra, especially the percussionists".
- In The Case of the Missing Pyramid, "Carmen steals the great pyramid of Egypt [on] a musical voyage down the great rivers of the world [which] ultimately takes us to New Orleans for a Mardi Gras surprise."

== Setlist ==
=== The Case Of The Missing Concert Hall ===
1. Carmen Sandiego Theme
2. Overture to Ruslan and Ludmilla - Russia
3. Hungarian Dance No. 5 - Hungary
4. Aria: O mio babbino caro - Italy
5. Bolivian Dance of the Sikuras - Bolivia
6. Toreador Song from "Carmen" - Spain
7. Washington Post March - USA

=== The Case of the Missing Bells ===
1. Danse Macabre - France
2. "Cool" from West Side Story - U.S.A.
3. "Dance of the Sugar Plum Fairy" from The Nutcracker - Germany
4. "Troika" from Lt. Kijé - Russia
5. "The Bell Song" from Lakme - India
6. "Great Gate of Kiev" from Pictures at an Exhibition - Ukraine
7. Liberty Bell March
8. Carmen Sandiego Theme

=== The Case of the Missing Pyramid ===
1. "Triumphal March" from Aida - Egypt
2. Moldau - Czechoslovakia
3. Kissha Gokko -Japan
4. "Hornpipe" from Water Music - England
5. Blue Danube Waltz - Austria
6. Old Man River - USA
7. When the Saints Go Marching In
8. Carmen Sandiego Theme

== Critical reception ==
In 2000 the concert was described as "an onstage extravaganza that has become one of the hottest tickets of the year", which came to fruition due to the "Marin Symphony [putting] tremendous effort into local educational programs."

=== The Case Of The Missing Concert Hall ===
According to The Deseret News, Inspector Clue-not "joked and bantered throughout this relatively short...musical mystery tour", which was both pleasant to listen to and varied enough to engage even the youngest audience member - despite some fidgeting during the longer pieces. It added "between the gags was some pretty credible music and solid individual performances. One performance that stood out was Jenifer Larson who sang an operatic "O mino babbiro caro" in her soprano voice, who "certainly hit the high notes and held her own with the orchestra at full volume". The most "interesting performance" was a "delicate and hauntingly beautiful" Koto piece called Image of Spring. Kay Qualley, Executive Director of the Oshkosh Symphony Orchestra said "This is an outstanding family performance that will entertain kids and adults with its interactivity and its musicality...Kids know Carmen Sandiego...and they’ll love this performance."

=== The Case of the Missing Bells ===
According to Karin Butler, director of operations for the Spokane Symphony, "More than 2,200 students from Coeur d'Alene, Kootenai, Post Falls and Lakeland attended the orchestra's two shows Tuesday at North Idaho College" in early 1999.

=== The Case of the Missing Pyramid ===
This "adventure sideline" of the family event Rivers of the World, during the Festival for Families at Sandpoint "kept audience interest alive with Aida". The Festival's Executive Director, Dyno Wahl said: “This year we really beefed up the children’s activities at the family concert”.
