= Carmen Sandiego Math Detective =

1998 video game

- CD cover art
- Developer: Broderbund
- Series: Carmen Sandiego
- Platforms: Mac OS, Windows
- Release: Winter 1998
- Genre: Educational
- Mode: Single-player

Carmen Sandiego Math Detective is a 1998 Carmen Sandiego video game. It is similar in structure to Carmen Sandiego Word Detective, which was released a year before.

== Development ==
The backgrounds for the game were sketched, refined and inked by Brian White. Michael Lipman was lead animation layout artist, character designer, and animator for the game.

== Plot and gameplay ==
Carmen Sandiego has shrunk famous landmarks into crystals using the Quantum Crystallizer machine, which the player must restore to their full size. The player infiltrates Carmen's hideout, but they are discovered. They manage to escape to the room with the Quantum Crystallizer where Chase instructs them to travel to different hideouts to find the pods that contain the landmarks. The player plays math-related minigames such as Atom Smasher, Crimewave Sensor, and Microchip Decoder, which, when completed, provide passwords to open the pods. Once the player has enough passwords, they can get the crystals, narrowly avoiding villains in the process, which allows them to free the landmarks from the crystals using the machine and return them to their original spot. The game comes with "over 400 word problems, a strategy guide, glossary of math terms and progress reports". There are 3 levels of difficulty.

Once all the landmarks are freed, Carmen reveals that she has been drawing power to the machine to make VILE central all-powerful. As the machine activates, the player unlocks it so Chase can reach the rock inside it. He puts the missing part of the rock in it, causing it to disappear, foiling Carmen's plan. After a confrontation with Carmen, she escapes.

The game teaches skills including: word problems, estimation, geometry, equations, modelling, whole numbers, money, fractions and decimals. These are presented as activities that help solve the game's puzzles rather than tiresome, repetitive exercises.

== Commercial performance ==
Around the year of its release, the game series had sold 6 million copies (40,000 in elementary schools).

== Critical reception ==
Reception

Review score
Publication	Score
Superkids	4.8 / 5

Award
Publication	Award
Parents' Choice	Gold Award

A description of the game Math Detective at the Learning Village says that the game is "extremely thorough on the learning front and has an engaging story line and a challenging mission", and that it is "an excellent program for those who like a challenge". It went on to say that the "program meaningfully challenges kids from the ages of 8 to 14 because it has 3 completely different operating levels of difficulty in all the math skill activity areas". A testimonial from 11-year-old Catherine, provided by the site, is "I don't really like math much but I really liked playing this game". Various other commentary on the game from the same website are: "They wouldn't put it down. I couldn't get them to bed" (Dad with two kids 9 and 12), "Loved trying to get the clue before the thief came back to the hideout" (Peter, age 10).

A review by Superkids said the game is "best suited for kids who like to hunt for clues and solve mysteries", and argues that by being "filled with challenges to spark the emerging mathematical mind", the game makes maths accessible to those who otherwise wouldn't be engaged by the subject matter. It gave the game a score (out of 5) 4.7 for educational value, 4.9 for kids appeal, and 4.9 for ease of use.

A writer for PC World notes that "you soon realize that the math drills go on far too long. The crystal hideaways are bleak and dull, and you don't really seem to be catching thieves", and adds that her "eight-year-old daughter, Julia, who actually asks us to buy math workbooks, quickly gave up".

Allgame gave the game a 4.5 star graphics rating - commenting that it was "cartoony, but extremely amusing", a 4.5 star sound rating - saying it was "ver[y] clear and easy to hear", a 4.5 star enjoyment rating - commenting that "[the] series has not lost its power to educate and amuse all at once", a 5 star replay value rating - saying "the three difficulty levels will give hours of replay" and that one minigame can be customised, and a 4.5 documentation rating - commenting the documentation "explains each game thoroughly and gives hints". Overall, the game was given an AMG Rating of 4.5 stars.

Larry Blasko of The Bryan Times said that "the visuals here are top-shelf, and the animations and music move smoothly, with nicely places sound effects and artistic flourishes". The Ohio newspaper noted however that it was impossible to uninstall the program, which is a negative as parents often needed to rotate the edutainment games on the computer to prevent their kids from getting bored.

The Illinois-based South Holland Star News thought the game "adds plenty of enjoyment to the rapidly multiplying world of Carmen Sandiego adventures". Cedar Rapids Gazette in Iowa felt the title's "engaging story line and...cool Carmen-trademark gadgets" would be popular with kids.
