= Carmen Sandiego Returns =

2015 video game

- Game logo
- Developer: The Learning Company
- Publisher: Houghton Mifflin Harcourt
- Series: Carmen Sandiego
- Platforms: Microsoft Windows, iOS
- Release: Microsoft Windows; May 14, 2015; iOS; November 18, 2015
- Genres: Puzzle, adventure
- Mode: Single-player

Carmen Sandiego Returns is a 2015 social studies puzzle adventure video game, part of the Carmen Sandiego franchise. It is developed by Houghton Mifflin Harcourt, and uses Intel RealSense Technology in order to enhance the immersive nature of player interaction. The educational game aims to teach players about world geography and culture to its 10–14 year old target market.

A different game was released on the iOS platform under the same name. This game marks the franchise's debut onto the smartphone market, and has a target market of people aged 9–11.

== Gameplay ==
Players have to travel across the globe, uncovering clues to work out where crooks are hiding. In each location, the player hunts for clues using their naked eye, an x-ray, and ultraviolet light, similar to a hidden object game. Players undertake a street racing minigame when chasing down the crook. Each case has a time limit, with hours being used whenever the player goes to a new country. They can use coins to speed up this travel time. The game comes with an encyclopedia to help players who cannot decrypt a clue.

Intel RealSense Technology allows players to use gesture control to do things like pick up clues and fly a plane. The use of puns, which is a staple of the series, is continued here, with names of crooks including "Hal Apenyo" and "Bea Carefull".

The free version of the game contains Pack 1: Museum Heist! (5 missions), while Pack 1: Museum Heist! (5 missions) and Pack 2: Monumental Emergencies! (10 missions) can be purchased together.

In the iOS version, each level sees the player start a case, travel the world, collect clues, fill out a warrant, and finally chase the crook. Players can track their progress on the leaderboard via the Apple Game Centre. In this version, players have two travel options: normal, and express, the latter of which takes up in-game currency. In each location players search for clues via their fingers' manipulation of the touch pad, and as witnesses offer them information, they can start to build up their warrant.

== Development ==
The first hint of the new game was made in January 2015 via a teaser trailer released on Houghton Mifflin Harcourt's YouTube channel entitled ACME Alert: Carmen Sandiego™ is back with a new game!. It said the game would be "available soon for free download on Amazon.com". A few months later in March, Edutainment Weekly quoted Houghton Mifflin Harcourt communications director Jennifer Berlin as saying that there would be future developments regarding an iOS app. Further details were peppered throughout press releases leading up to the game's official launch date: Carmen Sandiego Returns was advertised as being a bilingual game in English/French, and was noteworthy for offering the company "an opportunity to leverage legacy assets with a strong brand and fan base". On May 14, the game became available on Amazon, while in November, the app version was released to commemorate the 30th anniversary of the original Carmen Sandiego game. EdSurge noted that "her re-emergence coincides with a resurgence in the popularity of educational games", which had been in decline since the turn of the millennium.

== Reception ==
Much of the discussion about Carmen Sandiego Returns was in a new release that hearkened back to the first games in the franchise's thirty-year history. The Telegraph praised the game's educational content and "stellar graphics", noting it "has all the things 90's kids loved about the original character". According to GeekDad, the game "bring[s] the character back to life". The Livingston Post wrote that the game "revives the story and play of the Carmen Sandiego brand". MACNN said that "the voice acting is wonderful and the music and sounds have a cool edutainment circa '95 vibe". AppAddict praised the game's ability to retain its old gameplay while using new technology to enhance the experience, and called the title an "excellent" modern addition to the franchise. AppleGazette had a positive reaction to the game, after listing the game's nostalgic summary. Slashgear noted that in an attempt to appeal to the next generation of gamers who may be unfamiliar with Carmen Sandiego, HMH decided to release the game onto the platform they prefer, iOS.

There were some negative reactions to the gameplay. Apple N Apps gave it a 2 out of 5, writing that its nostalgia is ultimately outweighed by its simplicity, blandness, and shortness, concluding that despite a "promising pedigree" it had a "poor execution". MakeUseOf disliked the price point for each set of three 15-minute cases, commenting that a more cost-effective way to experience the franchise would be to download the free DOS versions of the 80's games. Meanwhile, TouchVision was generally ambivalent toward both the PC and iOS versions of the game. TouchVision criticised the PC version for requiring the player to purchase Intel RealSense, and the app version for only having three short missions for free before the player has to pay for more.
