= Where in the Universe Is Carmen Sandiego? =

Where in the Universe Is Carmen Sandiego? (aka Carmen I) was a live theatrical, edutainment program including a planetarium film, that is now licensed to planetariums across the US, Canada, and Japan. Started in 1999, the show featured the effects work of Adrian Ropp, produced by Dr. William A. Gutsch and composed by Mark Mercury. The program was "modeled quite closely after the very successful television [TV] programs, Where in the World Is Carmen Sandiego? and Where in Time Is Carmen Sandiego?. There was a conscious decision to design it as a "fast paced 'quiz show in outer space' but fashioned to foster and hone listening and math skills rather than requiring the audience to quickly recall pre-learned trivia". The program also encouraged audience participation, by answering questions to score points. Where in the Universe is Carmen Sandiego? - II (aka Carmen II) was later created, and included "over 30 minutes of original 3-D character and astronomical special effects animation". Both shows were written, produced, and directed by the author under license from Broderbund Software, Inc. Both programs utilize a model which "interfac[ed] a live teacher / presenter and the audience with famous characters recognized by children in a highly interactive setting. The Carmen products' goal was to "create even higher end products by utilizing large amounts of 3-D color computer animation yet, at the same time, make the shows affordable to as many planetariums as possible".

These films also featured Lynne Thigpen as "The Chief" and Rita Moreno as Carmen Sandiego, reprising their roles from the TV shows and videos games of recent years. They marked Thigpen's final appearance of the franchise before her death of a cerebral hemorrhage on March 12, 2003. The Carmen Sandiego website notes that though "timelines are unclear", the fact that they were both produced prior to Thigpen's death provides a clue. The site estimates Carmen i being released in 2001, and Carmen II being released in 2003. However, Carmen I premiered at the Omniplex in 1998., and Reservoir says the show premiered on February 13, 1998. IPS 2000 Conference suggests Carmen II was in production as of 2000. The shows are still going as of 2013. The 55 minute show is recommended for grades 2-4. The show is hosted by an actor, and accompanied by music and graphics of the PBS gameshows World and Time.

== Where in the Universe Is Carmen Sandiego? ==
Poster for Where in the Universe Is Carmen Sandiego?

The show was written and produced by Dr. Bill Gutsch, producer of the Sesame Street show "Wonderful Sky". Proceedings of the International Planetarium Society Conference explained the Carmen I's production: "To amass the necessary funding to create the program, a consortium of eight planetariums in the US and Canada was assembled by the author with each institution contributing $7200 to the production budget for the first Carmen show. Animation was provided by a variety of sources including Broderbund Software, Inc., Sky-Skan, Inc., and Evan & Sutherland. Video of talent in costume and make up was recorded on a large Ultimat sound stage in New Jersey with backgrounds and special effects added in post production. Five-part harmonies by Rockapella...were recorded at a sound studio in New York, mixed down from 14 tracks on ADAT to stereo on DAT and lip synced on the sound stage. Final video and audio elements were created and assembled on D1 and Betacam SP and converted, after final mix, to a pair of laser discs. To help create and preserve visual realism, panorama and all-sky environments for the show were created by Brian Sullivan as 3-D models which were then lit and photographed by individual planetariums to achieve best fit for their particular projection systems. The end result was a program which utilized highly recognized, franchised characters linked to television, computer games, and other merchandise, on-camera talent who had Tony, Oscar, Emmy, and Grammy Awards to their credit, and featured state-of-the-art 3-D color computer animation for a fraction of the cost to each institution that the show cost to produce as a whole". Michael Clark established the Clark Foundation, whose first donation - an $8,000 gift - was given to the planetarium in 1997 to help produce 'Where in the Universe is Carmen Sandiego.

Carmen I has been shown in over two dozen planetariums in the US, Canada, and Japan, has beaten attendance records for IMAX movies in the same location, increased overall annual attendance in individual planetariums by as much as 97%, and been over 800% more successful than all competing educational planetarium programs in the same theaters. The show has been highly praised by both teachers and students. A color show poster and a Teacher's Guide pack with pre- and post visit activities were also produced to complement the show.

ArtsPartners describes the show thus: Features a tour of our solar system in a story based on a popular television series. Carmen Sandiego has stolen the rings of Saturn, and it is the mission of the audience, each an Official Gumshoe of the Acme Detective Agency, to track Carmen down as she eludes her pursuers. The Planetarium's Head Gumshoe uses video effects, computer animations, NASA footage, and All Sky ship interiors to encourage class participation in the search to bring Carmen to justice. (55 mm.)". The show is for grades 2-6. Children under 3 and museum members were admitted free. A live actor plays the role of Wanda Ketchum (i.e. 'wander catch em').

== Where in the Universe is Carmen Sandiego? - II ==
Poster for Where in the Universe Is Carmen Sandiego? - II

The financial success of Carmen I allowed a sequel, Carmen II, to be produced. While Carmen I covered only the Solar System, Carmen II explored: stars, multiple stars, star clusters, stellar evolution, supernovae, neutron stars, black holes, and the size/structure of the Milky Way Galaxy. The show had higher production values than the original, with the team using "all the same production and education devices that made “Carmen I” such a success while, at the same time, increasing both the amount and quality of the computer animation employed". Many affiliated institutions contributed both funding and animation, giving the show extra talent such as that by animators: Salt Lake's Aaron McEuen, Houston's Tony Butterfield, Dickson's Weiherng Lee and Kevin Scott, and Vancouver's Erik Koelemeyer. The character and black hole animation was produced by a team of California animators. Steve Savage provided the Sky-Skan's animation material, while The Renaissance Center produced the video post production time and facilities. Again, a poster and an extensive Teacher's Guide were provided with the show.

The second show was highly successful program which "cost each consortium participant, and subsequent purchaser, only $6200", in a situation where the animation alone would have cost over $200,000. “Carmen I” and “Carmen II” demonstrated that "very successful production and fiscal models have been developed for the creation of high end educational planetarium programming".

ArtsPartners describes the show thus: "In this sequel to the popular show, Carmen escapes prison, develops Warp Drive, and plans to steal the black hole at the center of the Milky Way Galaxy. Gumshoes use their knowledge of the stars, nebulae, and other galactic objects to track Carmen down and bring her once again to justice!"

== Reception ==
The shows on the whole have received positive reviews.

Tourist Cliff Calderwood said the show "turned out to be a fun, enjoyable, and interactive way of discovering all kinds of interesting facts about our solar system. And the announcers and hosts of the Planetarium really get into the spirit of the quest. You don’t just get a bunch of awesome facts thrown at you".

Matt Alspaugh, show operator for the planetarium shows at Unitarian Universalism gave a uniquely< mixed review, saying: "I’ve tried to recall what it was about this show that caused me to hate it so much. It was this kind of low-brow, cartoonish, punny, show wedged in between the hard science stuff I loved. The kids love it though, and I was turning into a curmudgeon...I suspect that if I were to go back to that show now, I’d judge it less and enjoy it more." Marcos Stafne noted "Carmen was one of the hardest theatre experiences I’ve ever performed because of the difficulty of capturing anyone's attention when a giant Saturn was flying over my head."
