= Where in Europe Is Carmen Sandiego? =

1988 educational video game

- Developer: Broderbund
- Publisher: Broderbund
- Series: Carmen Sandiego
- Platforms: Apple II, Commodore 64, Amiga, MS-DOS, Mac
- Release: 1988
- Genre: Educational
- Mode: Single-player

Where in Europe Is Carmen Sandiego? is a 1988 European geography-based educational computer game in the Carmen Sandiego detective mystery franchise. It was originally published by Broderbund in 1988 for Apple II, Commodore 64, and MS-DOS, and ported to the Amiga and Mac in 1989. It is the third Carmen Sandiego title, after Where in the World Is Carmen Sandiego? (1985) and Where in the USA Is Carmen Sandiego? (1986). Under the guidance of The Acme Agency's chief, the player completes cases to catch Carmen's henchmen; they accomplish this by traveling to European cities to find clues relating to the crook's last known whereabouts, and by gaining enough character data to issue a warrant of arrest. Once the player has captured all 15 thieves, they can pursue Carmen herself.

Critics noted that the game followed the design of its Carmen Sandiego predecessors, and gave it generally favourable reviews.

== Development ==
The game intended to improve players' skills in map-reading, research, and problem solving. It was developed and published by Broderbund, Inc., and released on the Commodore 64, Commodore 128, Apple II, Mac, and IBM PC.; special editions of the program were made for use in classrooms. The Apple II version was released on a double-sided 5 1/4-inch disk, while the IBM version was available in either a 3 1/2 or 5 1/4 format. The disks were written using ProDOS.

The third in the series after Where in the World Is Carmen Sandiego? (1985) and Where in the USA Is Carmen Sandiego? (1986), it would be was followed by Where in Time Is Carmen Sandiego? in 1990. and Where in America's Past Is Carmen Sandiego? in 1991.

== Plot ==
Similar to the previous games in the series, Europe focuses on notorious master thief and leader of V.I.L.E crime syndicate Carmen Sandiego, whose band of crooks successfully stole a series of items after Sandiego broke out of a maximum security prison. While World and Time saw the crooks take worldwide and historical items, respectively, this game sees them take famous European items. As with other entries in the series, stolen items are not always physical and feasible; for instance one thief steals the geysers of Iceland. Some are even fictitious, such as James Bond's Aston Martin being stolen from the United Kingdom. The player's detective agency, The Acme Agency, has joined forces with Interpol, and has been tasked by the Chief to track down Carmen's crooks and stop Carmen. The player achieves this by traveling to locations, collecting clues, creating arrest warrants, and finally tracking down and arresting the criminals, thereby retrieving the stolen items. The Chief will introduce the stolen object at the beginning of each case, and sends the player off to the thief's last known whereabouts. 16 cases are included, and 34 countries ranging from east (USSR) to west (Iceland) Europe are featured. Starting as a gumshoe, players advance in rank within the Bureau as they succeed in cases and get promoted, until the final case when they have a shot at catching Carmen herself, when the player will achieve the level of Super Sleuth and have completed the game.

== Gameplay ==
The player has an in-game week to solve each mystery; the time ticks down when players do activities such as investigating, travelling, going to the Crime Lab, or even being inactive for too long (referred to as "sleeping"). If the player takes too long, they are automatically sent back to the Chief, who will brief them on a new case. When following the thief's trail, the player investigates by receiving information on the current location and the next known whereabouts of the crook. According to Broderbund, the game contained 1000 clues in total. When the player has gone to the correct location, they will receive an audio and visual feedback loop, including the text "A VILE (Villans International League of Evil) henchman. You must be on the right track"; conversely, a player will be given negative responses when trying to investigate in an incorrect location. Throughout each case, the Chief will send the player information about the suspect via Telegrams and Notes, such as their eye colour, hair colour, gender, and favourite movie. As opposed to earlier Carmen Sandiego releases, extra cultural learning opportunities are subliminally contained within the I.D. and geographic clues, through their references to cultural terminology such as "epic poem". Players will have to jot this down into their Crimestopper's Notebook, which automatically updates the character profiling software Crime Lab, which will issue a warrant from a list of suspects once there is only one suspect remaining. Even if the player locates the crook, if they don't have sufficient warrant papers the judge will let the suspect go free. If the player is successful, they receive a congratulatory message from the Chief before being briefed on the next case. In solving clues, hints are available in the Detective Guide, an on-line database with information on flags, currencies, and languages, as well as the physical atlas provided with the game.

The game opens at the entrance to the ACME European agency, where a robot says "Humanoid at console, Please log on"; the player can either use the same name of an in-progress game to continue, or type in a new name to start a fresh game. The left-hand of the screen had a colourful and cartoonish depiction of a landmark within the country the player was currently located in. At the top of the right-hand side of the screen there is either a clue about which location Carmen's crook has escaped to or information to add to their warrant, or a geographical, economic, or cultural fact about the location. An interface of options was below; players used this section of the screen to investigate, ask the locals for information, go to the airport to travel to a new location, or update their warrant. Almost all actions could be done by using the arrow keys or a joystick so there was little need to type with a keyboard. Apple II users were unable to use the mouse. The title contained a Save Game option to allow the player to return to an unfinished upon their return; each user name had only one save slot. The sound could be toggled on and off by pressing a keyboard key.

As in all Carmen Sandiego games, there is an educational element to the gameplay. Facts about European history and geography are included in each location. Rand McNally's Concise Atlas of Europe was included, and the game also contained a database of information on flag colors, currencies and languages, the first game in the series to do so. In addition to the atlas, players also received a User's Manual, and a physical poster with suspects on one side and facts about Europe on the other. The game was made secure against video game piracy by requiring the player to answer questions based on the hard-copy atlas before allowing further progress. This was an early method of protection.

== Reception ==
Reception

Review scores
Publication	Score
Computist	2/5
Computer Play	9.1/10
The House of Games	8/10

Carol S. Holsberg of Compute! praised the "winner" for its graphics, animation, ease of use, and for being just as exciting as its predecessors World and Time, commenting that it would appeal to educators, parents, and children. Holsberg thought the title demonstrated the ability of computers to be effective teaching tools that engages kids in a narrative while surreptitiously teaching them a wealth of worldly knowledge. Compute! suggested that Broderbund should provide a 3 1/2-inch option for the Apple II to reduce disk swapping, particularly with the 3.5 drive becoming far more commonplace with all the Apple IIGS machines available in homes and schools, and hoped the game would inspire other regional versions of Carmen Sandiego. In Issue #75 of Computist, three Carmen Sandiego games were reviewed by Jeff Hurlburt (World, Europe, and Time), and Europe was the lowest scored due to being less realistic; nevertheless the magazine praised the game for its colourful high resolution scenes and effective use of game windows, while noting that it used essentially the same format of the previous entries in the series. Hurlburt disliked how Telegrams and Notes were sent directly to the player from the Chief thereby eliminating the thrill of investigating and sleuthing, though concluded that it was an enjoyable way for players to learn more about Europe.

John Pustai of Commodore magazine thought the CIA-inspired Detective Guide, a new addition in this game, was a powerful educational tool that reinforced database information within a "computer-sided instruction environment", thereby adding to the title's educational value. He highly praised the user manual for not only providing operational information, but also strategies on how to advance through the game. Pustai thought the program could be used by children to reinforce content learnt in the school system, while also appealing to adults who would be motivated at the challenge of apprehending criminals; he noted that it was worthy of multiple excellence awards and concluded that the title demonstrated that the Carmen Sandiego franchise had limitless potential. Computer Play's Rusel Demaria noted that the game had a similar format to World and USA, while praising its ability to be both "high enjoyable" and "incidentally educational" in an industry where learning is often equated with unpleasantness. He wrote that the game was a rarity in organically getting the player actively enthused about conducting research and looking up facts, while offering a simplistic yet fun simulation of detective work that was "excellent" as a family activity and even appealed to real police officers. Demaria complimented the game's well-integrated graphics and sound, the ease of its menu-driven system, and its replayability, ultimately deeming it a worthy sequel in a series that constituted the best of educational gaming.

L. R. Shannon of The New York Times praised the game for cleverly disguising educational content inside of a video game. InCider noted that the game was "less global in scope" than the premiere entry in the franchise, Where in the World is Carmen Sandiego?. A reviewer in Issue #61 of Computist thought the game continued the tradition of Carmen Sandiego games simultaneously offering fun and learning, and enjoyed playing it so much they decided to put a deprotected version onto a 3 1/2-inch disk, via a method they printed in the magazine. Similarly, a reviewer in Issue #76 of the magazine lamented that the game was so "excellent" that it was a shame Broderbund placed copy protection on it.

In 1989, the game won a Software Publishers Association Excellence in Software Award for Best Social Studies/Science Program and Best Home Learning Program.

Unfortunately for Broderbund, just two years after the game's release, the entire communist Eastern Bloc collapsed, leading to massive changes in the geography of Eastern Europe, such as the reunification of Germany and dissolution of the Soviet Union, creating about two dozen new countries in the region, which rendered at least half the game's information obsolete, so production had to be discontinued.
