= Where in the World is Carmen Sandiego? 3 - New Carmen Adventure =

2009 video game

- Developer: Strass Productions
- Publisher: Mindscape
- Series: Carmen Sandiego
- Platforms: Nintendo DS, Windows
- Release: February 18, 2009
- Genre: Point-and-click Educational
- Mode: Single-player

Mais où se Cache Carmen Sandiego? Mystère au Bout du Monde ("Mystery at the End of the World") also known as Where in the World is Carmen Sandiego? 3 - New Carmen Adventure in English is a French Carmen Sandiego game released on February 18, 2009.

Mindscape had previously been acquired by The Learning Company (formerly SoftKey) alongside Carmen Sandiego developer Broderbund and took over its productivity, reference and entertainment brands when The Learning Company (formerly SoftKey) integrated its Broderbund division.

It is a point-and-click adventure aimed at ages 8 to 12. It follows ACME detectives Julia and Adam in a worldwide hunt across 10 countries for stolen world treasures. It is published by Mindscape, France, and developed by Paris-based Strass Productions. It was released for the Nintendo DS and for the PC.

== Plot ==
In ACME's New York branch, the Chief informs agent Julia that some of the world's greatest treasures have been stolen. The Chief suspects the thefts to be the work of Carmen Sandiego, but there is lack of evidence to confirm it. Julia along with Adam Shadow are sent to find the thief and recover the treasures, before news of the theft reaches the public. Matt Forrest provides technical assistance during the mission. After many investigations around the world and putting together a digital map of Atlantis, it turns out that Carmen Sandiego had been intercepting ACME communications and planned this entire mission. Carmen Sandiego steals the map and heads to South America.

== Gameplay ==
The gameplay consists of point and click elements. To progress the player must choose dialogue options during conversations, solve puzzles, make use of the digital handheld ACME computer and select a travel destination on the world map until a case is solved. When a case is solved the player gains a higher ACME rank.

== Critical reception ==
Reception

Review scores
Publication	Score
PALGN	2.5/10
CNet	4/10

A review of Where in the World Is Carmen Sandiego? 3 at PALGN was negative: "It's difficult to decide upon the worst aspect of Where in the World Is Carmen Sandiego? 3. The obvious indifference with which it's been slapped together? The frustrating, poorly devised puzzles? The fact that even though it does little more than slide 2D pictures across the screen, it still manages to introduce a game-stopping bug?". The game was given a score of 2½/10, calling the game as "tired, uninspired and buggy".

Deyel Dalziel-Charlier gave a negative review for the Nintendo DS version of Where in the World Is Carmen Sandiego? for Cnet. Whilst he enjoyed the bright clean graphics and the "occasional fun moments", he did not like the lack of challenge, the repetitive gameplay, the static visuals, and the sexual innuendo in a game aimed at children. He concluded his analysis by saying: "Where in the World Is Carmen Sandiego? is a frustrating game because while nothing is actually bad (though a few elements do come close) the whole package feels overwhelmingly mediocre. While it isn't really terrible, it's unimaginative, dull and unsatisfying". He rated the game 4 out of 10.
