= Where in the World Is Carmen Sandiego? (1996 video game) =

- CD cover art
- Developer: Brøderbund Software
- Publishers: Brøderbund Software; The Learning Company
- Series: Carmen Sandiego
- Platforms: Windows, MacOS
- Release: 1996
- Genre: Educational/strategy/side-scrolling
- Mode: Single-player

Where in the World Is Carmen Sandiego? (sometimes referred to as Where in the World Is Carmen Sandiego? v3.0) is a 1996 video game part of the Carmen Sandiego franchise. It was the third version of the game, after the 1985 original title of the same name and a 1992 Deluxe version of said game. The game's release coincided on the heels of the end of the PBS game show, and features QuickTime videos of Lynne Thigpen reprising her role as "The Chief". This was the last version of the game to follow the "classic" formula of the series (until the Facebook version), but much of the game, especially the "warrant" portion, was heavily redesigned. The Deluxe Edition released in 1998 (also sometimes subtitled as "version 3.5") added speech welcoming the player to each country and an "ACME Global Language Link-Up" satellite which quizzed the user on the local language. Players also received a spy watch and "an introduction to 12 foreign languages".

This "upgrade of the classic [1985] detective program", in which players "take on the role of gumshoe and explore the globe tracking down crafty criminals" remains the same as the original version. Upgraded features include: "guided tours of various locales and beautifully painted 360-degree panoramas". The game uses "geopolitical maps from National Geographic for more than 50 countries". The searchable database within the game contains: "video clips; essays on each area's economics, politics and culture; maps; and photographs.

According to the "BOX: TOP SOFTWARE CALENDAR YEAR", Where In The World is Carmen Sandiego was the second best-selling title of 1996 after Disney's Toy Story Animated Storybook.

== Production ==
On the upgrades made to this reboot, Broderbund Executive Publisher Ken Goldstein commented: "For years, children, families and schools have embraced Carmen Sandiego as an educational geography product filled with lively animation, high quality sound, and superb graphics...New technology has given us the opportunity to create a new generation of Carmen Sandiego software in which the quality of animation is as sophisticated as what children are used to seeing in movies and television. We feel the enhancements we've introduced to game play may set a new standard for educational software."

One of these improvements was that the game, along with the rebooted version of Where in the USA is Carmen Sandiego, "use film clips of actress Lynne Thigpen to assign cases to gumshoes and tell them if they're on a hot or cold trail". In addition to this, "A variety of zany animated characters give information about the description and whereabouts of the fugitive, and other clues tell something about the country or city where the bad guy has fled."

The Carmen Sandiego site explained:

It takes anywhere from 12 to 18 months to make a computer game these days. Where in the World is Carmen Sandiego? Version 3.0 took about 13 months of production time to complete. But brainstorming about the design started as far back as February of 1994, which just goes to show you how much time and thought goes into making a great game! A large team of over 30 people worked to create the game. This group includes artists, photographers, writers, musicians, sound designers, programmers, product managers, product testers, and the list goes on!

Larry Tuch was a contributing scriptwriter on the game.

=== Animation and design ===
The animation in the game closely imitated the look of traditional animated cartoons. The animations that alert the user that the correct destination has been reached featured either Carmine from Carmen Sandiego: Junior Detective Edition or a pair of bumbling janitors named Rick and Nick ICK according to the game manual. These animations, as well as the animations that depicted the arrest of the crooks, featured much use of cartoon physics. Ivan Idea will arrive with his floating orb that brings out a mallet to hammer the crooks; Herman Nootix would close his book onto the crooks and shrink them; Dee Plomassy would call her bodyguards to tie up the crooks, Renee Santz would paint her ropes onto the crooks to capture them; Rock Solid would roll on a log and flatten the crook, Ann Tickwittee will shove the crooks into her vase; and Kim Yoonity will lasso up the crooks with her telephone wire.

The Carmen Sandiego website explained regarding the 3D landscapes:

A lot of work went into making the 360 degree illustrated backgrounds in Where in the World is Carmen Sandiego? Version 3.0 as true-to-life as possible. All of these backgrounds are based on actual photographic references, taken at real locations by a photographer spinning in a circle. As all this spinning occasionally made the photographers dizzy, some inaccuracies or omissions may exist. In particular, our artists sometimes removed natural obstacles from a scene--like clumps of bushes or trees--in order to allow a better view of more significant objects.

== Gameplay ==
Unlike in the previous games, the image of the locations took up most of the screen, with the game options only taking up the bottom third of the screen. Each location had an elaborately painted backdrop that could be scrolled around a full 360 degrees. Each location provided clues in the form of several bystanders and scraps of paper lying on the ground. The scraps of paper exclusively provided clues about the suspect's appearance.

This game used a few aspects from the previous Junior Detective Edition game. For instance, this game identified locations by the name of the country, used the "fuel limit" convention instead of the "time limit" and eliminated the questions that needed to be answered before being promoted. However, the game did feature an elaborate time system that calculated the time of arrival in each country given the flight time and the number of time zones crossed. Traveling to the correct locations is represented by comedic acts of Carmen's pet cat, Carmine, or two bumbling janitors that were assigned to clean up after the crooks.

The user is not given dossiers describing the members of V.I.L.E., but all the clues given about the suspect are physical traits, enabling the user to identify the crook on sight. This means that the user will have to compile a full warrant rather than one of just enough traits to distinguish which crook is responsible. In the final destination, the crook is seen walking around the location with several innocent bystanders, meaning the user will have to use the warrant to identify which person is the criminal.

== Critical reception ==
Reception

Awards
Publication	Award
Codie award	1996 - Best Secondary Education Program
PC World	1996 World Class Award
SPA	Excellence in Software Awards - Best Early Education Program

A review of the game by Peter Oliver for Kids Domain concluded by saying: "WWCS is computer gaming at its best. It has great graphics, it's splendidly presented, the sound and music are wonderful, and, most importantly, it's simply a lot of fun to play. The subject matter may be a few years beyond our 4-year-old's level, but he enjoys simply watching and listening to the game. Meanwhile, Mom and Dad have a lot of fun playing the game together after the kids are in bed. We're learning more about geography than we ever did in our school years, and even when its well past any reasonable bed time for parents of young kids, Mom and Dad are saying, 'Just one more.' Now how many kids' computer games can you say that about?" Lisa Karen Savignano of Allgame said "Where in the USA is Carmen Sandiego represents a huge leap forward in the Carmen Sandiego series. Unlike the earlier versions of the game, which were mostly text-based, this new version is presented in more of a graphical format" and gave the game 4 out of 5 stars.

Cognitive Remediation for Psychological Disorders: Therapist Guide says that in regard to problem solving, deductive reasoning, inductive reasoning, attention to detail, and visual/auditory memory, World is harder than the 1996 U.S.A. game. However, it also says that both games "range in levels of difficulty from moderate to difficult". The 24 Aug 1996 edition of Billboard described World and U.S.A., which were to come out during the holiday season (autumn), as "hotly anticipated". It said they both "feature a richer environment and a beefed-up geographic database".

Computers, Curriculum, and Cultural Change: An Introduction for Teachers cites the game, as well as Oregon Trail, SimCity, and Decisions as "simulation programs" which "provide students with experiences they could not otherwise have by creating a limited model of a particular situation or phenomenon". Children's Literature: Discovery for a Lifetime describes the game as "an interactive detective story that also provides geography lessons to participants". An article in Network World in December 1996 says that modern educators believe "it is more important to teach children how to play [the game] than fill their heads with lifeless geography facts".

Digital Diaspora: A Race for Cyberspace says that even though white masculinity dominates the gaming industry, there are some exceptions such as this title or Lara Croft Tomb Raider which are "girl-inflected game [which embrace] white femininity". The December 1996 edition of Working Mother described the database as "a perfect resource for school projects". The December 1999 edition of Working Mother said of both the US and World Deluxe editions (released in 1998) "[players]'ll learn about the music, culture, and historic sites of each region", and added "the ever-popular Carmen programs just seem to get better and better". The article `Sandiego' still getting better says that the game has "high-quality content, use of the latest technology and the fun factor...show[ing the Broderbund] folks know what they're doing".
