= Math Workshop =

- Developer: Broderbund
- Publisher: Broderbund
- Platforms: Windows; Macintosh
- Release: September 1994
- Genre: Educational

Math Workshop is a 1994 educational video game developed and published by Broderbund. It was released in September 1994.

== Gameplay ==
The player enters various areas of the workshop and interacts with activities that often involve placing pieces on a board to complete pictures as exercises in spatial relationships, clicking objects so the character Poly can explain them, and navigating tasks that include sections such as the Rhythm Shop, all while animations play and certificates can be printed as rewards.

== Reception ==
Reception

Review scores
Publication	Score
All Game Guide	3/5
Macworld	4/5

CNET called Math Workshop well worth your while. The Daily Telegram liked the puzzles in Math Workshop.
