= Where in Space Is Carmen Sandiego? =

1993 video game

- Developer: Broderbund
- Publisher: Broderbund
- Designers: Bob Arient; John Baker; Michael Barrett; Christa Beeson; Michelle Bushneff; Jim Everson; Ken Goldstein; Lance Groody; Tom Rettig; David Ross
- Series: Carmen Sandiego
- Platforms: Classic Mac OS, MS-DOS
- Release: UK: May 1993
- Genre: Educational

Where in Space Is Carmen Sandiego? (also with a Deluxe suffix) is an educational video game developed and published by Broderbund. It was released in 1993 for Classic Mac OS and MS-DOS

== Gameplay ==
With only minor aesthetic changes to the interface, the game is familiar to anyone who played the previous entries. Each investigation follows a variation on the classic Carmen Sandiego formula: Sandiego or one of her gang has stolen something, and players need to collect evidence across the Solar System in order to obtain an arrest warrant before capturing the villain du jour. Research into topics of space exploration—classical astronomy, constellations, contemporary exploratory efforts (e.g. the Viking program), and more—is needed to succeed in capturing the master thief and her 14 "henchthings". After capturing several gang members, the player will begin receiving increasingly obscure clues.

The chief of detectives issues each assignment: a valuable artifact has been stolen from somewhere in the Solar System (e.g. the Skynd crater from Umbriel, Sacajawea Patera from Venus, or Hermes' winged hat from Mercury). After traveling to the last place the thief was seen, clues will indicate to which of 32 available locations the suspect fled, and once players search each new location for new clues, the chase continues. Following too many incorrect leads will exhaust the player's fuel, insufficient clues will preclude an arrest warrant, and over-analysis will afford the suspect time to fully escape; all of which are a game over.

The game's built-in database (VAL 9000) not only contains data on the Solar System and space exploration (with digitized NASA photographs), but also criminal dossiers, a log of where the player has already been, and sarcastic commentary on the player's progress.

== Development ==
Developed by Broderbund, Where in Space was designed by Bob Arient, John Baker, Michael Barrett, Christa Beeson, Michelle Bushneff, Jim Everson, Ken Goldstein, Lance Groody, Tom Rettig, and David Ross.

=== Technical specifications ===
Running Where in Space Is Carmen Sandiego? on an IBM PC compatible required an Intel 80386 processor (or compatible), VGA graphics, 640 kilobytes of random-access memory, eight megabytes of hard disk drive space, and DOS 3.1 or later; a sound card and mouse were recommended. No digital rights management was built into the game.

On the Macintosh, Where in Space required ten megabytes of hard drive space.

== Release ==
Where in Space Is Carmen Sandiego? was released alongside the popular Where in the World Is Carmen Sandiego? children's television game show. In the UK, Broderbund and Electronic Arts published the game in May 1993. In the United States, Where in Space sold for US$79.95 (equivalent to $178.19 in 2025) in August 1993; by May 1994, a Macintosh version had been released, selling for US$40 (equivalent to $86.89 in 2025).

In 1995, University Games published a Junior Detective Edition of Where in Space. It sold for US$21.95 (equivalent to $46.38 in 2025), and was marketed for ages eight and up. That December, The Columbian wrote that children enjoyed learning about outer space, and that Where in Space was better than other Carmen Sandiego games they had played, but that it was also "too difficult for 8 year-old kids". The Register-Guard agreed that, while more fun than other games in the franchise, it was too much for the youngest children in its advertised age bracket.

== Reception ==
Review scores
Publication	Score
AllGame	3/5
Aktueller Software Markt	11/12
Computer and Video Games	65/100
PC Games (DE)	69/100
PC Player	73/100

Charles Taft with PC Magazine was happy with this new outing of the already-venerable series. Small aesthetic and gameplay changes kept players' interactions fresh, while the core gameplay stayed true to the series' formula. Where in Space Is Carmen Sandiego? did not ship with a hard copy of encyclopedic resources, and Taft touted how the equivalent built-in Val 9000 database was available to end-users without running the game. Clayton Walnum wrote for Compute! that not only was Where in Space a "wonderful" entrant to the series—though the few animated sequences quickly became repetitive, the VAL 9000 alone was worth the US$79.95 asking price. Computer Shopper praised the game's graphics (both original and of space), and commended the game's animation, user guide, and "well-scripted powerful musical score". This magazine also conceded that, while fun, Where in Space could become repetitive. Of the Macintosh version, in 1994 Dwight Silverman of The Register-Guard said "[t]he graphics are gorgeous and the script witty".

For Computer Gaming World, Charles Ardai thought the animations were great but too few, the audio was creative but became grating and repetitive, and the puzzles were fine but lost their trickiness after repetition; after questioning the relevance of the game's lessons in comparison to the previous versions, Ardai ultimately thought that Where in Space was merely satisfactory. As strictly a game, PC Player wasn't impressed with the game, citing the grind of the process, but they rated the game at 73/100, saying that the graphics would probably attract both children and adults. Despite technical improvements over previous Carmen Sandiego games, PC Games only recommended Where in Space as a reference work, rating it at 69/100. When Computer and Video Games rated the game a 65/100, they said that "it becomes boring extremely quickly".

In 2015, Bustle ranked the intro music from Where in Space as the second-best piece of music from the Carmen Sandiego franchise, behind only the theme music from the Where in the World Is Carmen Sandiego? game show.
