= Where in the World Is Carmen Sandiego? (2011 video game) =

Where in the World is Carmen Sandiego?
- Promotional artwork for the game.
- Developer: Blue Fang Games
- Publisher: The Learning Company
- Series: Carmen Sandiego
- Platform: Facebook
- Release: February 9, 2011
- Genre: Educational game/Puzzle game/Adventure game
- Modes: Single-player; Multiplayer

Where in the World is Carmen Sandiego? was a Learning Company Facebook puzzle game released in 2011. It was an adaption of the 80s and 90s Carmen Sandiego games of the same title. The game, which was released along with another game The Oregon Trail, was developed by Blue Fang Games and released by The Learning Company.

This version, a remake of the first Carmen Sandiego game, was released on the social network site Facebook on February 9, 2011. The game was taken down in 2012.

== Development ==
Dubbin, one of the developers, explained that he originally wrote a spec for Blue Fang, "with the kind of clues I might do and the sort of material you might get". He played the original game numerous times and put together a series of sample clues. Because of the scale involved (each of the 66 cities had many clues about them), a team was assembled to write them. The developers acknowledged the effects of a search engine like Google to the fact-finding nature of Carmen Sandiego, and incorporated this into their design.

== Gameplay ==
Players began the game in the Chief's office in the ACME headquarters in San Francisco, where they could check which cases were available to choose. After accepting one of the available cases, players started by traveling to the first crime scene. Much like in the original games, players could travel through the city to search for and collect clues; the city clue hinted at the next geographic location to fly to, and the ID clue at the identity of the thief for that case. Important information was collected and listed in the clue log. The player could open up the map and fly to the next destination. If in the new location people gave you additional clues, the player was in the right place; if they didn't know anything, the player was in the wrong location and had to backtrack. The suspect list was narrowed down until only one option remained, and a warrant could be issued for the suspect's arrest. Without a correct warrant, one could not pass the case. Players had a certain number in-game days to complete the case, which were defined by the distance traveled between two geographic locations, not by real-time. Shortcuts could be bought by spending Facebook Credits. If players missed the deadline, the suspect would escape and the case would be closed without a reward being issued. This version included 86 world cities that players could visit:

== Critical response ==
The game has received generally positive reviews.

Matthew Booth of Avault gave the game a rating of 3/5 stars. He notes that "it might not possess all of the characteristics of a AAA game, but it's entertaining and a good option if you're at work and need to kill a few minutes". He comments that "if you find yourself stuck on a clue, you can cheat like I did and enlist the help of Google, or you can request help from your friends". His closing comments are "it's free and you're already wasting time on FB, so what's to lose? But don't expect anything worth the hype...now if Carmen Sandiego had zombies, maybe then I'd stay interested". Out of the options "Skip it", "Play it" or "Buy it", he suggested "Play it".

Dan Zuccarelli of Gamezebo gave the game rating of 4 1/2 stars out of 5. He comments that "the great news is that the game's transition to Facebook doesn't detract from it in any way. Quite the opposite actually. Jet setting, clue solving, and criminal catching is as fun as ever". He adds that playing on the social medium allows players to ask their friends for help or even get them to take part in your cases. However, he also says that in the pre-internet era of Carmen Sandiego games, players were equipped with a "big desk reference book" that allowed them to search for answers to clues they were given throughout the cases, but also commented that with Google and Wikipedia "only a browser tab away", it is hard to resist the temptation of getting the correct answer immediately. He said that he was addicted to the game and kept saying "just one more case!". His closing comments were that "Carmen Sandiego's engaging and educational gameplay is just as good now as it was way back when". While the pros were its engaging and educational gameplay, and great presentation, the cons were it having not enough visual variety.

On Common Sense Media, the game is rated 2/5 for positive messages, 2/5 for positive role models, 3/5 for ease of play and 2/5 for consumerism. The review notes that "the game does not push its premium currency on the player as aggressively as other titles, and the game is perfectly enjoyable without needing it". It gave the game an overall rating of 5/5 stars, arguing that the game is "essentially the same game as its PC counterpart", as opposed to its Oregon Trail counterpart which "resulted in a highly commercial and arguably less fun experience". It adds that "cases seem to be randomly generated and there are more than a dozen suspects, so replay value is very good". The site advises that the game is for ages 13 and up.
