= Where in America's Past Is Carmen Sandiego? =

1991 video game

- Developer: Broderbund
- Publisher: Broderbund
- Series: Carmen Sandiego
- Platforms: Apple II, MS-DOS, Classic Mac OS
- Release: December 1991: MS-DOS; 1992: Apple II, Mac
- Genre: Educational
- Mode: Single-player

Where in America's Past Is Carmen Sandiego? is the 5th educational video game in the Carmen Sandiego series. It was produced by Broderbund and released in 1991.

== Gameplay ==
Bundled with What Happened When (an abridged version of Encyclopedia of American Facts & Dates), the game includes 45 geographic locations, and 9 different historical eras to travel to. This far outweighs the number of travel destinations in the 1985 Where in the World Is Carmen Sandiego? game. Carmen and her henchmen are involved with some of American history's most iconic moments, including the signing of the Declaration of Independence.

== Development ==
The scenery for the locations came from photographs that were digitized and pixelated.

== Reception ==
Reception

Awards
Publication	Award
Codie award	1992 - Best Home Learning Program
Software Publishers Association	1991 - Excellence in Software Awards

PC Magazine said the game "offers complexities of plot and graphics that make the original Where in the World is Carmen Sandiego seem almost bland by comparison". It said the game "won't disappoint adventure hungry Carmen fans" and that "as edutainment, this game is fun and challenging". Compute! named it a "Compute Choice", calling the game's VGA graphics "stunning". The magazine concluded that "Where in the Past is Carmen Sandiego? is a must-have package for anyone interested in superior and engaging entertainment software". Computer Gaming World liked the game, but stated that it would become boring to older children and adults, and that it seemed designed to teach rudimentary facts about the chronology of American history as opposed to details. The reviewer was hopeful, however, that Where in America's Past would encourage students to study history on their own.
