= Where in the World Is Carmen Sandiego? (1985 video game) =

1985 video game

- Developer: Broderbund
- Publisher: Broderbund
- Series: Carmen Sandiego
- Platforms: Apple II; Commodore 64; Amstrad CPC; Apple IIGS; Amiga; Atari ST; Classic Mac OS; Dragon 32/64; MS-DOS; FM Towns; Master System; TRS-80 Color Computer; TurboGrafx-16; Genesis; Super NES
- Release: April 23, 1985
- Genre: Educational

Where in the World Is Carmen Sandiego? is an educational video game released by Broderbund on April 23, 1985. It is the first product in the Carmen Sandiego franchise. The game was distributed with The World Almanac and Book of Facts, published by Pharos Books. An enhanced version of the game was released in 1989, which did not have the almanac-based copy protection and instead used disk-based copy protection. A deluxe version was released in 1990, and features additional animation and a reworked interface from the original version. Some of the bonus features include digitized photos from National Geographic, over 3200 clues, music from the Smithsonian/Folkways Recordings, 20 villains, 60 countries, and 16 maps. CD-ROM versions for MS-DOS and Mac were released in 1992. A Windows version was released in 1994.

In the game, the player takes the role of a rookie in the ACME Detective Agency, tasked to track down crooks from the V.I.L.E. organization who have stolen famous works from around the world. They do this by using their knowledge of geography (aided by the Almanac) to question witnesses or investigate clues to track down where the crook has gone. Successfully solving these crimes increases the player's rank in ACME, leading to more difficult cases and later being tasked with finding the leader of V.I.L.E. and namesake for the game, Carmen Sandiego.

The game was initially developed as a menu-driven interface to replace the text-driven interface of adventure games like Colossal Cave Adventure for graphic-enabled computers like the Apple II. Along the way, the idea of introducing geography as part of the game and distributing the Almanac with the game shifted its approach. While it was not intended as an educational game at release, the game proved very successful as an educational tool for schools. By 1995, over four million copies of the game had been sold, and established the Carmen Sandiego franchise. This game is not to be confused with the 1996 rebooted version sometimes mistakenly called the "Deluxe" version.

== Plot and gameplay ==
The goal of the game is to track down Carmen Sandiego's villains around the world, arrest them and later capture Carmen herself. Each case begins with an alert stating that a spectacular crime has been committed, after which the player travels to the scene and begins to gather information, traveling throughout the world in the hope of catching the thief before time runs out. There are 30 countries that can be visited in the game, each identified by one of its prominent cities (which are not always consistent with the country images displayed on screen).

In each city, the player has four options:

- See/Hide connections: Brings up or hides a list of cities that the player can reach from the current location.
- Depart by plane: Travel to one of these cities.
- Investigate: Choose one of three places in the current location and interview a witness, gaining clues about the thief's identity and/or next destination.
- Visit Interpol: Enter details about the thief into the Interpol database in order to narrow the field of suspects. (The gender of the thief is always stated in the initial alert.)

A screenshot from the game, showing the options to the player at a given location. Carmen Sandiego's interface was designed as a graphic menu-driven adventure game to remove the ambiguity of previous text adventure games.

The player can use a combination of facts from a reference book (provided with the game) and clues from the witnesses to decide which country to visit next. If the player travels to an incorrect location, none of the witnesses there will report seeing anything suspicious and the player will have to backtrack to their previous location for another attempt. Correct choices are indicated by a brief animation of a V.I.L.E. henchman lurking on the screen.

Once the Interpol database determines that only one suspect fits the profile entered by the player, it will issue an "arrest warrant" (the equivalent of a Red Notice) for that person. If the player enters details that eliminate every possible suspect, the database will display a message to this effect and issue no warrant.

Once the player reaches the thief's final location, any attempts to investigate will yield an animation such as a knife being thrown or a gun being fired, and the witnesses will only tell the player to be careful. The thief is hiding in one of the three places open to investigation; if the player chooses it and has the correct warrant, the police chase and apprehend the thief and the case is solved.

Each action taken by the player uses up a certain amount of in-game time, as displayed by an on-screen clock. Once the hour grows late enough on any given day, the player will automatically go to sleep for several hours and resume work the next morning. The thief will escape if not caught before the deadline set in the initial alert, or if the player catches up to them without holding a warrant in their name.

The player becomes eligible for promotion after solving enough cases. Before the new rank is granted, though, the player must correctly answer a geography question with the help of the provided reference book (used as a form of copy protection). The cases become more difficult as the player advances, with more potential locations to visit. The culprit in the final case is Carmen Sandiego herself; apprehending her earns the player a spot in the game's Hall of Fame.

The Master System version plays quite differently compared to the other versions. Instead of using a menu-based system, a sprite character representing the player can be moved to the respective buildings within a country, to get a warrant or back to the airport to travel. The player must duck or jump knife attacks from henchmen and gun attacks from Carmen's gang, and will lose some time recovering if hit.

=== Locations ===
This is a list of the 30 locations visited in the game, organized in alphabetical order by country. Note that cities are identified as they were in the game and that they are followed by the country that the city would have been located in at the time the game was produced.

Cities and countries
Buenos Aires, Argentina	Reykjavík, Iceland	Lima, Peru
Sydney, Australia	New Delhi, India	Kigali, Rwanda
Rio de Janeiro, Brazil	Baghdad, Iraq	San Marino, San Marino
Montreal, Canada	Rome, Italy	Singapore
Peking, China	Tokyo, Japan	Moscow, Soviet Union
Moroni, Comoros	Bamako, Mali	Colombo, Sri Lanka
Cairo, Egypt	Mexico City, Mexico	Bangkok, Thailand
Paris, France	Kathmandu, Nepal	Istanbul, Turkey
Athens, Greece	Oslo, Norway	London, United Kingdom
Budapest, Hungary	Port Moresby, Papua New Guinea	New York, United States

=== Deluxe version ===
Where in the World Is Carmen Sandiego? Deluxe
- Developer: Broderbund Software
- Publisher: Broderbund Software
- Series: Carmen Sandiego
- Platforms: MS-DOS, FM Towns, Windows, Classic Mac OS
- Release: 1990: MS-DOS; 1992: CD-ROM
- Genres: Educational, strategy
- Mode: Single-player

Where in the World Is Carmen Sandiego? Deluxe, on CD-ROM, adds digitized photographs from the National Geographic Society and music from Smithsonian/Folkways. Each location contains three sources of clues: The user can question a bystander, search the area, or call "Crime Net". Bystanders and "Crime Net" provide clues as to the suspect's location and, on occasion, additionally state something about the suspect. Searching an area along the perpetrator's path turns up an object that provides a clue as to the suspect's location. The Deluxe edition is the first in the series to feature dialogue spoken aloud, although most information still appears in written form and the dialogue of bystanders is not spoken but rather contained in speech balloons.

== Development ==
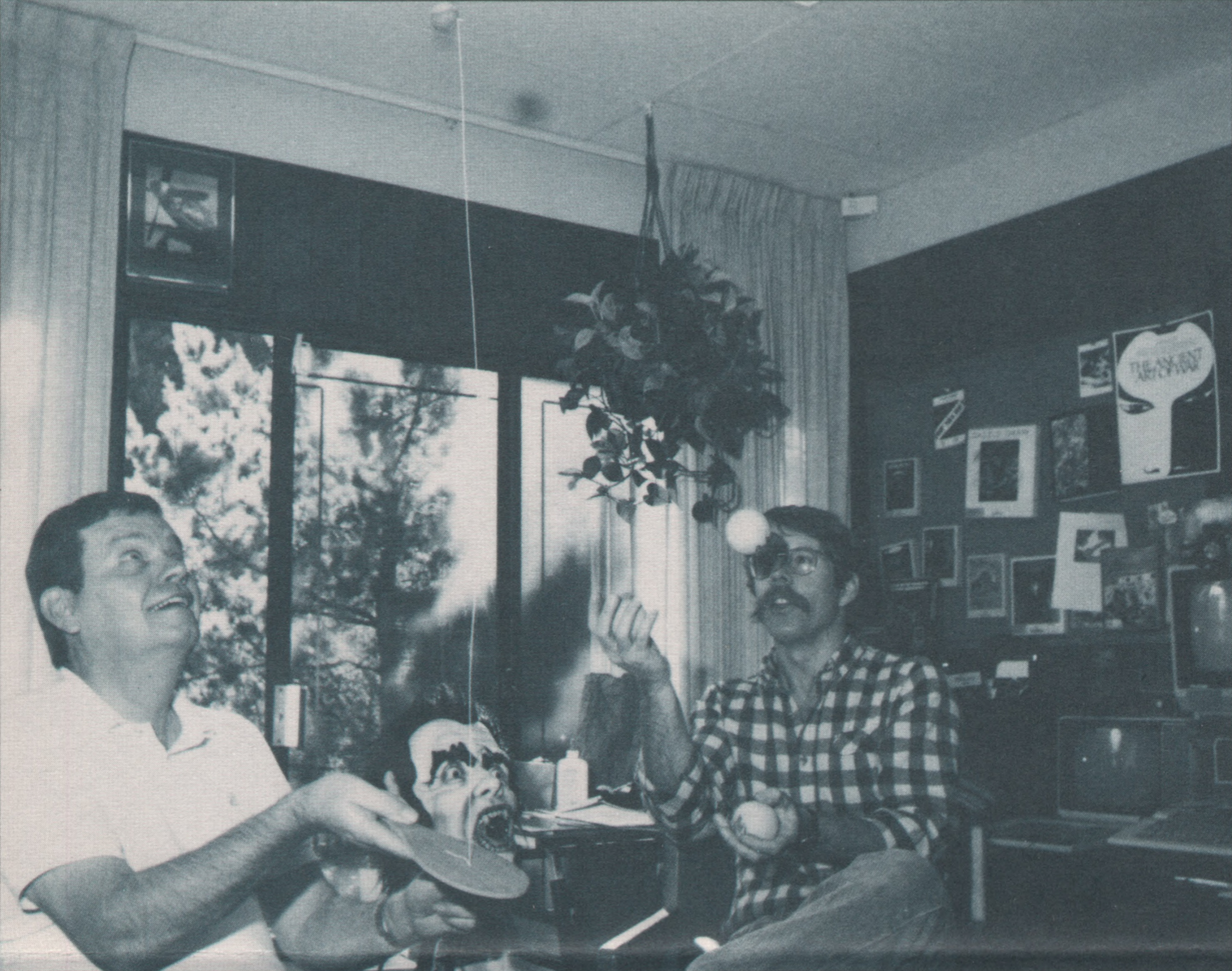
Portwood and Elliott in the "Rubber Room", 1985

Where in the World Is Carmen Sandiego? was the first product developed within Broderbund, which had only published externally developed software. The conception of the game began in 1983, though it did not start off as an educational game. Broderbund programmer Dane Bigham had played the text adventure game Colossal Cave Adventure, but found that players would struggle in trying to find the correct synonyms to use for the commands programmed into the game, a limitation of computational power at that time. With the Apple II home computer gaining popularity, Bigham believed he could write an adventure game for children, using the graphics of the Apple II to provide menu-driven commands to replace text commands. Bigham developed the game to a point where it contained enough locations and concepts to take it to Broderbund's "Rubber Room", the offices of Gene Portwood, a former Disney artist, and Lauren Elliott, as to start developing a more complete story and art for the game. Bigham's initial idea, based on the childhood game of cops and robbers, did not readily get Portwood's attention, but as Bigham pared down the concept, in particular focusing the game on catching one criminal at a time rather than multiple, Portwood warmed up to the idea.

As Bigham, Portwood, and Elliott worked on this approach, Broderbund co-founder Gary Carlston suggested changing the game from an adventure to one focused on geography, recalling his own travels as a child in Europe in the 1950s. Bigham was not as thrilled with this idea, but continued on with the game focusing on refining the game's interface.

To compose a narrative, Carlston hired writer David Siefkin, and initially suggested a narrative around the Great Cities works from Time-Life Books, but later directed him to use the World Almanac, as Carlston had plans to ship the game with the Almanac with it.

Siefkin wrote the first script for the game beside the swimming pool in Strawberry Canyon on the campus of the University of California at Berkeley. Siefkin was also inspired by Colossal Cave Adventure, transforming the cavern into a map of the world, where the rooms of the cavern become countries with real treasures, and the clues were based on the languages, culture, and geography of those countries.

Siefkin's first script featured several villains, one of whom he named Carmen Sandiego. Siefkin adapted Carmen's name from the Brazilian singer and actress Carmen Miranda, and from the American city of San Diego, California. Project manager Katherine Bird latched onto that name believing it captured something exotic and mysterious. She was described in the original game manual as "An agent, double agent, triple agent, and quadruple agent in so many countries that even she has forgotten which one she's working for". Carlston also liked the name as they could design a female character for it, allowing young women to be able to connect with the game, as well as not having to worry about her backstory of why she became a crook. The name also lent well to the title Where In the World Is Carmen Sandiego? as it succinctly informed the player of the game's goal. With this, they fleshed out two organizations: V.I.L.E. – Villains' International League of Evil – and the ACME Detective Agency – with ACME jokingly considered an initialism for "A Company that Makes Everything". Some of the villains in V.I.L.E. were designed from other Broderbund employees: Carmen was modeled after Marsha Bell, the company's manager of marketing services, while the villain "Katherine Drib" was an anagram of Bird's name. Others were named based on puns, such as "Ken U. Sparadigm" for "can you spare a dime". The game would now require the player to start as a recruit for ACME, and work their way up by locating the henchmen within V.I.L.E., until finally they were ready to track Carmen. As they worked their way up, they would have less in-game time to find the crook, and the geographic trivia would become harder.

Bigham refined and developed this idea further. In the initial script, the game would select a random villain and a stolen treasure, and start the player in a randomly-selected city with a clue of where to go next via Bigham's menu interface. Getting the right answer would give the player another clue to the next location, and this process would repeat five to six times until the villain was caught and a new game started. Siefkin and Bigham believed that children would learn about the world through trial and error as they played the game. Broderbund approved of this idea for the script and incorporated it into the existing development.

Shortly after completing the first script, Siefkin passed the U.S. Foreign Service examination and was invited to join the U.S. State Department as a diplomat. He is listed in the game manual as a contributing author, and received two percent of the royalties from the original Carmen Sandiego game. He was astonished when, a few months later, he began to receive substantial royalties from the game.

Bigham considered his relationship with this first Carmen game as one of "love-hate", as he had been more inspired to develop action games, and Carlston had denied him opportunities to work on these at Broderbund while Carmen was still in production. Bigham was still not sure if the game would be successful, and once the game was complete by 1985, took a brief leave from Broderbund to work with Douglas E. Smith during that summer. When he returned to Broderbund, he was surprised that Carmen was popular from a market area they did not anticipate, that being from an educational standpoint, becoming a core piece of software in many schools.

== Reception ==
Reception

Awards
Publication	Award
Software Publishers Association (1985)	Best Learning Product
Classroom Computer Learning (1986)	Outstanding Software Award
Software Publishers Association	SPA Certified Platinum
Software Publishers Association	Certified Diamond

Where in the World Is Carmen Sandiego? was a commercial blockbuster. It was Broderbund's third best-selling Commodore game as of late 1987. In April 1989, the game was awarded a "Diamond" certification from the Software Publishers Association for sales above 500,000 units, making it one of the top two best-selling computer games in the United States (along with Karate Champ) up until June 1989. It went on to achieve sales above 800,000 units by December 1989. At the time, Joyce Worley of Video Games & Computer Entertainment called its performance "an incredible accomplishment for any piece of entertainment software and especially remarkable for an educational game." It had surpassed two million units sold by 1991, and four million by 1995. In 2003, Computers and Education wrote that Carmen Sandiego was "by far the best-selling educational software in North America".

Roy Wagner reviewed the game for Computer Gaming World, and stated that "The graphics are nice and the manual is well written with a dossier on each thief. The game is good for schools or played as family activity. Everyone is sure to learn something."

Compute! called Carmen Sandiego an example of Broderbund's "attention to detail", and added "that it helps teach research skills and fundamentals of geography as well seems almost too good to be true ... it's entertaining enough to disguise the fact that you might be learning something while you play". The magazine gave it the 1989 Compute! Choice Award for Educational Software, stating that it successfully combined teaching and fun. Info gave the Commodore 64 version four-plus stars out of five, describing it as "a really good educational game ... you'll hardly be aware that you've been taught. The graphics and gameplay are nice, too".

GamePro gave the SNES version a positive review. They described it as identical to the earlier PC and Genesis versions, and praised the graphics and the strong edutainment value.

In 2021, The Strong National Museum of Play inducted Where in the World Is Carmen Sandiego? to its World Video Game Hall of Fame.

=== Deluxe version ===
In April 1994 Computer Gaming World said that the Deluxe CD version "adds substantial value to an already excellent game". The San Diego Union said the "'Carmen Sandiego Deluxe' game is challenging, but still fun", adding that "Kids will be anything but bored". Boston Globe said it was "for older children". Pittsburgh Post-Gazette described it as a "fast paced detective chase". The Los Angeles Times said "[Carmen Sandiego's] creators at Broderbund have remade her bigger and badder than ever in a terrific new CD-ROM release of "Where in the World Is Carmen Sandiego? Deluxe Edition", and gave the game a rating of 5 out of 5 stars.

The game was given a press score of 6.3 by IGN, and a Reader Review Average of 8.0, a GameFAQs Rating Average of 8.5, and a GameRankings Average of 6.2 off the website GameFAQs. Nintendo Power gave the game a rating of 3.075 out of 5. A review of the 1992 version of Where in the World Is Carmen Sandiego? by Gary Hartley for HonestGamers concluded by saying: "For the most part, this is a good game. It has its share of flaws, but you should find it above average overall". Hartley gave the game a score of 6/10 (Good).
