= List of Broderbund products =

Broderbund was a large American software developer and publisher most active in the 1980s and the 1990s. Though most of their products were video games, they also published a number of home productivity software titles.

== Legend ==
Video game platforms
3DO	3DO	AMI	Amiga	APPII	Apple II
ATR	Atari 8-bit computers	ATR52	Atari 5200	ATR78	Atari 7800
ATRST	Atari ST, Atari Falcon	BBC	BBC Micro, Acorn Electron, BBC Master	C64	Commodore 64
CDI	CD-i	CLV	ColecoVision, Coleco Adam	CPC	Amstrad CPC
DOS	PC DOS / MS-DOS, Windows 3.X	DS	Nintendo DS, DSiWare, iQue DS	FDS	Famicom Disk System
FM7	FM-7	GB	Game Boy	GBC	Game Boy Color
GEN	Genesis / Mega Drive	GG	Game Gear	IBM	IBM PC, IBM PC compatible
iOS	iOS, iPhone, iPod, iPadOS, iPad, visionOS, Apple Vision Pro	JAG	Atari Jaguar	LYNX	Atari Lynx
MAC	Classic Mac OS, 2001 and before	MSX	MSX	NES	Nintendo Entertainment System / Famicom
PALM	Palm OS	PC88	PC-8800 series	PC98	PC-9800 series
PCD	TurboGrafx-CD / PC Engine CD-ROM²	PS1	PlayStation 1	PSN	PlayStation Network
PSP	PlayStation Portable	SAM	SAM Coupé	SAT	Sega Saturn
SCD	Sega CD / Mega-CD	SG1K	SG-1000	SMS	Master System
SNES	Super NES / Super Famicom / Super Comboy	TRS80	TRS-80	VIC20	VIC-20
WIN	Windows, all versions Windows 95 and up	X360	(replace with XB360)	X68K	X68000
XBOX	(replace with XB)	ZX	ZX Spectrum		

Video game genres
Action	Action game	Action-adventure	Action-adventure game	Adventure	Adventure game
Educational	Educational video game	Platformer	Platformer	Puzzle	Puzzle video game
Puzzle-platformer	Puzzle-platformer	RPG	Role-playing video game	RTS	Real-time strategy
Shoot 'em up	Shoot 'em up	Sports	Sports video game	Strategy	Strategy video game
Vehicular combat	Vehicular combat game	Wargame	Computer wargame		

== Notable series ==
The following is a list of notable IP made by Broderbund.

Series	Initial Release	Latest Release	Description	Ref.
Carmen Sandiego	1985	2025		
Kid Pix	1989	2018	An educational environment	
Living Books	February 7, 1992		A series of edutainment titles based on popular children's books	

== List of video games ==
Title	Release date	Platforms	Genre	Description / Notes	Ref.
A.E.	1982	APPII, ATR, MSX, PC88	Shoot 'em up	Co-developed by Programmers-3	
Airheart	1986	APPII	Action	A game by Dan Gorlin	
Alien Tales	1995	WIN, MAC	Educational	Also released as Reading Galaxy	
The Ancient Art of War	1984	APPII, MAC, DOS	RTS, Wargame		
The Ancient Art of War at Sea	1987	APPII, MAC, DOS	RTS, Wargame	A game focused on naval warfare	
Apple Panic	1981	APPII, ATR, DOS, VIC20	Platformer		
The Battle of Olympus	1988	NES	Action-adventure	A game set in Ancient Greece	
Captain Goodnight and the Islands of Fear	1985	APPII	Action-adventure	A side-scrolling game where you fly a plane, drive a tank, steer a jeep, pilot a sub, and ride a tram.	
Capitalism Plus	1996	WIN	Business sim		
The Castles of Dr. Creep	1984	C64	Puzzle-platformer	A game set in medieval castles	
Centauri Alliance	1990	APPII, C64	RPG		
Championship Lode Runner	1983	APPII, C64, DOS, NES	Puzzle-platformer	The sequel to Lode Runner	
Choplifter	1982	APPII, ATR, ATR52, ATR78, C64, CLV, FM7, MSX, NES, SMS, VIC20	Action	Player is a helicopter pilot attempting to save hostages being held in prisoner of war camps	
CosmoGIRL! The Game!	2000	WIN	Quiz	CosmoGirl magazine branded game about the life of a teenage girl	
Darby the Dragon	1996	WIN, MAC	Adventure	Part of the StoryQuests game series.	
The Dark Heart of Uukrul	1988	APPII, DOS	Turn-based, RPG	A first-person fantasy RGP with some advanced features for its time.	
David's Midnight Magic	1982	APPII	Pinball		
Deadly Towers	1986	NES	Action-adventure		
Drol	1983	APPII, ATR, C64, PC88, SG1K	Platformer	A game with a cartoon robot hero	
Dusty Diamond's All-Star Softball	1990	NES	Sports	Publisher for the NA release.	
Galactic Empire	1980	APPII, ATR, TRS80	Strategy	Brøderbund's first game; a sci-fi space conquest game	
Genetic Drift	1981	APPII, ATR	Shoot 'em up	Written by Scott Schram	
Gregory and the Hot Air Balloon	1996	WIN, MAC	Adventure	Part of the StoryQuests game series. Won the Parent's Choice Gold Award.	
The Guardian Legend	1988	NES	Action-adventure, Shoot 'em up	Also known as Guardic Gaiden	
Gumball	1983	APPII, C64	Action		
In the 1st Degree	1995	MAC, DOS, WIN	Adventure	An interactive legal drama	
Karateka	1984	CPC, APPII, ATR, ATR78, C64, DOS, FDS, GB, ATRST, ZX	Action	An game with influential, pioneering animation	
Koala Lumpur: Journey to the Edge	1997	WIN, DOS	Adventure		
The Last Express	1997	DOS, MAC, WIN	Adventure	A game set right before the start of World War I	
Labyrinth	1982	APPII, ATR	Shoot 'em up, Maze	Written by Scott Schram	
Legacy of the Wizard	1987	NES	Adventure, RPG	A sidescrolling game in the Dragonslayer line	
Lode Runner	1983	APPII, ATR, BBC, C64, CPC, IBM, iOS, LYNX, MAC, NES, PS1, PSN, SG1K, SNES, VIC20, WIN, X360, ZX	Puzzle-platformer		
Logical Journey of the Zoombinis	1996	MAC, WIN	Educational, Puzzle	Created by Chris Hancock and Scot Osterweil of TERC	
The Mask of the Sun	1982	APPII, C64, ATR	Interactive fiction		
Matchboxes	1983	ATR, C64	Puzzle		
Math Workshop	1994	WIN, MAC	Educational	Edutainment game that teaches math	
Moebius: The Orb of Celestial Harmony	1985	AMI, APPII, ATR, C64, DOS, MAC, ATRST	Action, RPG	A top-down tile-based game with some action sequences	
Myst	1993	3DO, AMI, CDI, iOS, JAG, MAC, DS, PS1, PSP, SAT, WIN	Adventure	A game with ground-breaking 3D computer graphics	
Operation Whirlwind	1983	ATR, C64	TBS	A battalion-level game set in Northern France	
Orly's Draw-A-Story	1997	DOS, MAC, WIN	Educational	An edutainment game where the user draws pictures for inclusion in a story	
PlayMaker Football	1989	DOS, MAC, PALM, WIN	Sports (football)		
The Playroom	1991	AMI, APPII, DOS, MAC	Educational	An early childhood education system	
Prince of Persia	1989	AMI, APPII, CPC, DOS, GB, GBC, GG, iOS, MAC, NES, PCD, PSN, SAM, SCD, GEN, SMS, SNES, ATRST, X68K, X360, ZX	Platformer	First game in the Prince of Persia series	
Prince of Persia 2: The Shadow and the Flame	1993	DOS, MAC, SNES, XBOX	Platformer	Sequel to the original Prince of Persia	
Raid on Bungeling Bay	1984	C64, MSX, NES	Shoot 'em up	First game designed by noted designer Will Wright	
Red Alert	1981	APPII	Shoot 'em up		
Rugrats Adventure Game	1997 or 1998	WIN, MAC	Point and click adventure	Based on the Nicktoon series Rugrats	
Seafox	1982	APPII, ATR, C64, VIC20	Shoot 'em up	Player uses a submarine to sink enemy ships	
Serpentine	1982	APPII, ATR, C64, DOS, VIC20	Maze	Featuring an ever-growing player-controlled snake	
The Serpent's Star	1983	APPII, ATR, C64	Interactive fiction	Developed by Ultrasoft	
Shufflepuck Café	1989	AMI, ATRST, CPC, NES, X68K, PC98, DOS	Sports (air hockey)		
SkyChase	1988	AMI, ATRST, DOS	Vehicular combat (plane)		
Spellcraft: Aspects of Valor	1992	DOS, SNES	Strategy		
Spare Change	1983	APPII, ATR, C64	Action		
Spelunker	1983	ATR, C64, MSX, NES, PSN	Platformer	A game with a cave exploration theme	
Star Blazer	1982	APPII, ATR, MSX, VIC20	Shoot 'em up	Winner of a Certificate of Merit in the category of "Best Arcade/Action Computer Games" at the 4th annual Arkie Awards.	
Star Wars	1983	C64, DOS, MAC	Rail shooter	A sci-fi space combat game based on the Star Wars media franchise; port of original arcade game	
Stealth	1984	ATR, C64	Rail shooter	A pseudo 3D game	
Stellar Shuttle	1982	ATR	Action	A Lunar Rescue clone written by Matt Rutter.	
Stunts	1990	AMI, DOS, PC98	Racing	Contains special track areas featuring early 3D computer graphics	
The Treehouse	1991	DOS, MAC, WIN	Educational	Point-and-click game with minigames and minimal encyclopedic information	
Track Attack	1982	APPII, ATR	Maze, Platformer		
Typhoon Thompson	1988	AMI, ATRST	Action	Enhanced remake of Airheart	
WarBreeds	1998	WIN	RTS	A sci-fi resource management video game	
Where in the World Is Carmen Sandiego?	1985	APPII, C64, DOS, MAC, PCD, SMS	Educational	The first game in the Carmen Sandiego series	
Where in North Dakota Is Carmen Sandiego?	1989	APPII	Educational	The only entry in the Carmen Sandiego series designed to teach facts about a single US state.	
Where in Time Is Carmen Sandiego?	1989	AMI, APPII, C64, DOS, SMS, NES, GEN, SNES	Educational	A time travel video game in the Carmen Sandiego series	
Whistler's Brother	1984	ATR, C64	Platformer		
Wings of Fury	1987	AMI, APPII, C64, CPC, DOS, GBC	Vehicular combat (plane)	A World War II fighter plane action game with some simulation aspects	
Wolfpack	1990	AMI, DOS, MAC, ATRST	Vehicle sim (submarine)	A World War II game	
Write, Camera, Action!	1996	MAC, WIN	Educational	A game where the user has to help complete a Hollywood film, and tries to solve a mystery while doing so.	

== List of other products ==
The following is a list of all non-game titles produced by Broderbund.

Title	Release Date	Platforms	Description	Ref.
Arcade Game Construction Kit	1988	C64	An arcade game construction program	
The Arcade Machine	1982	APPII	An arcade game construction program. Winner of a Certificate of Merit in the category of "Most Innovative Computer Game" at the 4th annual Arkie Awards.	
The Amazing Writing Machine	1995	MAC, WIN	Creative writing and drawing software	
Animate	1987	APPII	Animation program similar to Dazzle Draw	
Banner Mania	1989	DOS	Banner making program. Released by Broderbund; developed for Pixellite Group by Presage Software Development.	
Calendar Creator	1995	WIN	Create calendars	
Dazzle Draw	1984	APPII	Paint program to create bitmapped image files	
Fantavision	1985	AMI, APPII, DOS	Animation program based around "tweening" and transforming objects.	
The Music Shop	1985	C64	A music notation program with playback capabilities.	
The Print Shop	1984	APPII, ATR, C64, DOS, MAC	A desktop publishing title for home users.	
Science Toolkit	1985	APPII, DOS	Data logging software with a hardware interface that obtains real time data from sensors.	
The Toy Shop	1986	APPII, C64, DOS, MAC	A set of computerized templates for assembling mechanical paper models	
Type!	1986	C64, DOS, MAC	A typing program	

== See also ==
- Red Orb Entertainment — Broderbund's game publishing division
