= Zoombinis =

- Series logo
- Genres: Educational, puzzle
- Developers: TERC and Broderbund (1996); The Learning Company (formerly SoftKey) (2001-2002); TERC, FableVision, and Learning Games Network (2015)
- Publishers: Broderbund (1996); The Learning Company (2001-2002); TERC (since 2015)
- Platforms: Windows, Mac OS, OS X, iPadOS, Android, Fire OS
- First release: Logical Journey of the Zoombinis; March 1996
- Latest release: Zoombinis; August 2015

Zoombinis is a series of educational puzzle computer games that were originally developed by TERC and published by Broderbund. In 1998, Broderbund was purchased by The Learning Company, (formerly SoftKey) who took responsibility for developing and publishing the series in 2001. The series consists of three games: Logical Journey of the Zoombinis (1996), Zoombinis: Mountain Rescue (2001), and Zoombinis: Island Odyssey (2002). Logical Journey was remade as Zoombinis for modern operating systems in 2015. The series focuses on the Zoombinis, small blue creatures each with different appearances and personalities, which the player must guide through strange puzzle-filled lands.

== Games ==
=== Logical Journey of the Zoombinis (1996) ===
Zoombini Isle, the Zoombinis' homeland, has been taken over by the evil Bloats. The Zoombinis flee, but end up in a mysterious and treacherous land. Players must guide the Zoombinis through this land to reach the safety of a new settlement: Zombiniton (Zoombiniville in the U.S.). The original version of the game by Broderbund Europe released in March 1996,. The European version has different names of some areas of the game.

==== Gameplay ====
The player starts at Zoombini Isle, where they assemble a team of 16 Zoombinis, picking from 5 different options each in hair, eyes, nose color, and footwear, for a total of 625 (400 in the 2015 remake) possible combinations. Each combination can be used twice in the game. The player then has to do a series of minigames, helping the Zoombinis traverse through dangerous places until they reach the next location on the island. By the end of a minigame, a number of Zoombinis may be left behind. At the end of a section, the Zoombinis can rest at a campsite and be stored to join another group of Zoombinis if there are fewer than 16 Zoombinis left. From the first campsite are two branching roads that take the Zoombinis to two different areas of the island. These roads eventually join up at the second campsite which leads to the final section of the island. At the end of the final section lies the target destination Zombiniton/Zoombiniville. A monument is added to the new town if a group of 16 Zoombinis makes it through a leg of three challenges without any being lost. The game ends when 625 (400 in the 2015 remake) Zoombinis make it to Zoombiniville.

==== Zoombinis Logical Journey v2.0 (2001) ====
The original game was expanded and republished as Zoombinis Logical Journey v2.0 by The Learning Company in September 2001.

==== Zoombinis (2015) ====
In 2014, TERC began an internally funded redevelopment of Logical Journey of the Zoombinis. In February 2015, they launched a Kickstarter campaign to fund additional enhancements and releases and on 25 March, the campaign was funded successfully, with the total pledged double the original target of $50,000. The main improvements are updated graphics and the game's ability to run on modern operating systems.

Zoombinis was officially released on 6 August 2015 for iPadOS, Android, Windows and MacOS, and for Fire OS on 28 October of the same year by TERC, FableVision, and Learning Games Network.

=== Zoombinis Mountain Rescue (2001) ===
After the foundation of Zoombiniville, the Zoombinis find peace once more, until a small group of them get trapped inside a cave seeking shelter from a storm. They meet up with strange creatures called Boolies who occupy a city known as Booliewood. As a result of the storm, the Boolies have been scattered across the land, and their mayor, the Grand Boolie Boolie, has disappeared. The goal of the game is to rescue a total of 400 Boolies and bring them to Booliewood to return the Grand Boolie Boolie.

==== Gameplay ====
The player begins in Zoombiniville, where they assemble a team of 16 Zoombinis. Like the previous game, the player has to get as many of the 16 Zoombinis through the minigames as possible, by making use of the Zoombinis' different characteristics in accordance to the patterns and principles of the minigames. Some of the minigames however, require only the player's logic, regardless of the Zoombinis' characteristics. After all minigames are completed on one part of the land, the player progresses to play more minigames on the next part of the land. The gameplay takes more of an adventure game approach, as the number of Zoombinis on a part of the journey vary throughout different areas of the game after each checkpoint between Zoombiniville and Booliewood. The checkpoints are where Zoombinis that do not make it through minigames return to. The player also has the option to send the Zoombinis on alternate routes from checkpoints across the land to complete different minigames.

=== Zoombinis Island Odyssey (2002) ===
Long after the take over of Zoombini Isle at the hands of the Bloats, the island was completely stripped of its food and plant life, leaving the Zerbles and native moths hungry while the Bloats abandon the isle. A seagull travels to Zoombiniville and informs the Zoombinis of the situation. After an expedition of Zoombinis survey the damage on the island, they decide to bring caterpillars to restore balance to the island's chain of life.

==== Gameplay ====
The player begins by creating a group of 12 Zoombinis, which can be customized. The player must then complete different puzzles, such as growing berries and breeding moths, to eventually restore the ecosystem of the island. This game incorporates science concepts and math concepts into the puzzles, including intersection of rates, cryptography, astronomical time, Venn diagrams, and Punnett squares, as well as some reincarnations of puzzles from Logical Journey. The graphics have again received an update. The Zoombinis are fully 3-D, but their features no longer affect gameplay. When the Zoombinis release 224 Zerbles into the wild, the game is won.

== Educational effects ==
The game works with problem solving through mathematics, deduction, and hypothesis testing primarily by clearly stating the goal of the problem at hand, with the option to either deduce for one's self or learn from gameplay strategies for success. In 2015, the National Science Foundation awarded TERC nearly $2 million to study how much "computational thinking" children do while playing Zoombinis (2015), both at home and in the classroom, and whether teachers can extend the lessons outside the game.

=== Mathematical aspects ===
The different games a player encounters when trying to get the Zoombinis from Zoombini Isle to Zoombiniville represent many mathematical characteristics. "Pizza Pass", "Allergic Cliffs", and "Stone Cold Caves" exercise the sorting, grouping, and comparing of information. "Captain Cajun's Ferryboat", "Stone Rise", and "Titanic Tattooed Toads" reinforce ordering, linking information, and problem solving. "Fleens!", "Mudball Wall", and "Hotel Dimensia" emphasize graphing and mapping, while "Lion's Lair", "Mirror Machine", and "Bubblewonder Abyss" train the player in sorting, organizing, and algebraic thinking.

=== Deductive reasoning ===
Sub-games such as "Allergic Cliffs" and "Stone Cold Caves" require the player to find patterns and arrangements of the Zoombinis in order to pass the obstacle. Each game also has a select number of attempts which may be failures before a Zoombini is taken back to the beginning of a path segment (to Zoombini Isle, or to the base camps of Shelter Rock and Shade Tree), giving an incentive for the player to think critically and not randomly guess answers. As a result, these games enable players' deductive skills while also enforcing strategic efficiency.

=== Hypothesis testing ===
Players also encounter critical thinking with testing and observing different logical outcomes in "Pizza Pass" and "Mudball Wall". By examining the varying characteristics of toppings on a pizza and the number and color of dots on a wall, the player can experiment with the correct patterns to get the Zoombinis to the next level. Similarly, with the deductive reasoning sub-games, these exercises discourage random guessing by giving only a few options to fail before losing a Zoombini. However, with the games that involve more hypothesis testing, the incorrect guesses remain on the screen in a categorized pile so that the player might learn from previous attempts to come to the correct conclusion.

== Awards ==
Year	Nominee / work	Award	Result
2003	Zoombinis Island Odyssey	Bologna New Media Award	Won
