= Tawala's Last Redoubt =

1981 video game

Galactic Saga IV: Tawala's Last Redoubt
- Developer: Broderbund
- Publisher: Broderbund
- Series: Galactic Saga
- Platform: Apple II
- Release: June 1, 1981
- Genre: Strategy
- Mode: Single-player

Tawala's Last Redoubt is a strategy video game programmed by Douglas C. Carslton and published by Broderbund for the Apple II in 1981 as the fourth and final entry in the Galactic Saga series.

== Plot ==
In the game, you play as Benthi, the leader of a rebellion against cruel tyrant Tawala. You've previously ousted the Emperor from his throne, and he has since fled to distant planet "Farside", preparing to make a final stand. Your goal is to eliminate Tawala and his remaining Minions.

== Reception ==
Hartley G. Lesser of BYTE in June 1982 "highly recommend[ed]" Tawala's Last Redoubt for Apple II, citing its manual, adjustable speed, and savegame function.
