= Sierra Print Artist =

Computer program from Sierra Home

Print Artist
- Website: www.printartist.com

Sierra Print Artist is a computer program from Sierra Home (part of Sierra Entertainment). The software allows the user to make cards, calendars, stationery and other assorted crafts and then print them with their printer. The current version is 25.

== History ==
The program was originally developed by Pixellite Group in the early 90s. The MS-DOS version was written by Christopher Schardt. The original Windows version was written by Mr. Schardt, and Ferdinand G. Rios and Tracy Elmore of SAPIEN Technologies Vince Mills handled later versions.

The program was first published in 1992 under the name Instant Artist by Autodesk. After half a year or so, Autodesk decided to abolish its consumer products division. Maxis then published the program under the name Print Artist. In 1995, Sierra On-Line purchased Pixellite Group and the rights to the software and it became known as Sierra Print Artist. It was published under Sierra's "Sierra Home" label and continues to be today despite several purchases and mergers of Sierra On-Line beginning in 1996.

The underlying vector-graphics/font-effects technology was developed by Dane Bigham and Christopher Schardt. It was first used in Banner Mania, published by Broderbund, also written by Christopher Schardt. Steve Hales wrote the Mac version of BannerMania. Marty Kahn (the author of the original Print Shop) wrote the Apple II version. The technology also found its way into what would eventually become the WordArt add-in for Microsoft Word.

A popular feature of the program was the Graphics Grabber, developed by Vince Mills, which enabled the program to handle a catalog of thousands of vector and bitmap graphics, organized by keywords. Sierra Home also publishes Hallmark Cards-licensed versions of the program as Hallmark Scrapbook Studio Deluxe and Hallmark Holiday Card Studio. OEM-branded versions of Print Artist also came bundled with certain Epson printers and scanners.
