= Choplifter III =

- Developers: Teeny Weeny Games; Beam Software; Broderbund
- Publishers: Ocean; Extreme Entertainment Group; Victor Interactive Software
- Platforms: Game Boy,, Game Gear, Super NES
- Release: Super NES: NA: January 1994; EU: August 8, 1994; JP: September 9, 1994; Game Boy: EU: 1994; Game Gear: NA: 1993
- Genres: Shoot 'em up, strategy
- Mode: Single-player

Choplifter III is a shoot 'em up video game released for the Super Nintendo Entertainment System in 1994. It was the third Choplifter title starting with the original Apple II game released in 1982.

A portable version of the game was released for the Game Gear, but this version was actually a remake of Choplifter II. This version of the game was subsequently re-released for the Game Boy.

== Gameplay ==
The gameplay revolves around piloting a rescue helicopter into hostile territory and rescuing hostages. The player's task is made more complicated by the limited number of hostages the helicopter can carry as well as increasing difficulty throughout the four chapters of the game. Each chapter is split into four collective stages and set in a different environment, starting off with jungle, desert, sea, and finally city.

The game also has a number of minibosses spread throughout the campaign.

== Reception ==
Reception

Review scores
Publication	Score
Electronic Gaming Monthly	SNES: 8/10, 8/10, 7/10, 8/10, 8/10; GG: 7/10, 7/10, 6/10; 7/10, 7/10
GamePro	SNES: (Note: Graphics: 4/5, Sound: 4/5, Control: 4/5, Fun Factor: 4.5/5)
Nintendo Power	SNES: (Note: Graphics: 3.1/5, Play Control: 3.6/5, Challenge: 3.4/5, Theme/Fun: 3.5/5)
Official Nintendo Magazine	GB: 68%
Super Gamer	SNES: 85/100
Nintendo Acción	SNES: (Note: Graficos: 3/4, Sound: 3/4, Jugabilidao: 3/4, Diversion: 4/4)

GamePro gave the game a mostly positive review, commending its "beautiful" graphics and "addictive" gameplay. Electronic Gaming Monthly gave it a 7.8 out of 10, commenting that it is suitable for fans of military simulation games. In 1995, Total! ranked the game 92nd on their "Top 100 SNES Games" list.
