= Galleons of Glory: The Secret Voyage of Magellan =

1990 video game

- Developer: Broderbund
- Publisher: Broderbund
- Platform: MS-DOS
- Release: 1990
- Genre: Simulation

Galleons of Glory: The Secret Voyage of Magellan is a simulation video game developed and published by Broderbund in 1990 for MS-DOS. The game sees the player simulating the voyage of Ferdinand Magellan, using the sea navigation tools given to them in an attempt to discover the Strait of Magellan.

== Gameplay ==
Galleons of Glory is a game in which players seek to discover the Straits of Magellan.

== Reception ==
Alan Emrich reviewed the game for Computer Gaming World, and stated that "Broderbund has done a fine job of creating a simple game with plenty of fascinating history for players to learn quite transparently while they enjoy the game's play."

Steven Anzovin for Compute! said that "if you are intrigued by the exploits of 'so noble a captain,' as Magellan's chronicler Antonio Pigafetta called him, take the helm. Galleons of Glory proves to be quite a seaworthy simulation."

== Reviews ==
- ASM (Aktueller Software Markt) - Apr, 1991
