= Airheart =

1986 video game

- Publisher: Broderbund
- Designer: Dan Gorlin
- Platform: Apple II
- Release: NA: 1986
- Genre: Action
- Mode: Single-player

Airheart is an action game designed and programmed by Dan Gorlin for the Apple II and published by Broderbund in 1986. It requires a 128K Apple IIe (or later) to run, as it uses the 16-color double hi-res graphics mode. After three years of development, the game was technically advanced at its time of release, using scaled sprites for 3D effects, but did not include all of the planned features. Gorlin reworked the game as Typhoon Thompson in Search for the Sea Child for the Atari ST (1988), and later the Amiga (1990), which is closer to what he originally envisioned.

== Gameplay ==
Players assume the role of a warrior tasked to rescue an infant prince in a structure over the ocean. They are tasked by the Spirit Guardians to retrieve three items: a sword, goblet and harp, to prove their fitness to perform the rescue. Players navigate using a sled and shoot robots using a projectile weapon attached to it. There are seven types of robots, each with a different defense system, with some pursuing the player or attempting to destroy their craft. Players must pick up the Pod of a destroyed robot before it respawns the robot.

== Development ==
Airheart was developed by Dan Gorlin, who had previously developed Choplifter. Airheart took about three years to develop. This is in large part because he also developed other games which he lost interest in and never completed, and also because he did a lot of research and built a number of tools to help in game development. Gorlin was unable to include all the features he planned. At one point, for example, he had tunnel and underwater levels working, but was unable to complete them due to time constraints. Tunnels and islands, in fact, were key elements of his original vision for the game, but had to be scrapped, being too ambitious for the time.

The largest version of each sprite was created by hand, then Gorlin used proprietary tools to create the roughly twenty smaller versions. Storing these sprites in RAM, he was able to simulate scaling in real time. Though the sprites used a lot of memory, it was the only method that satisfied Gorlin since he hated the low-polygon look of other contemporary games.

== Reception ==
Reception

Review score
Publication	Score
Contact	3/10

Critics cited Airheart as an example of more sophisticated arcade games arriving on the Apple II, a genre they considered had been neglected on the system. A+ praised the visual fidelity and smooth scrolling of the game as "superb", although found the game too easy to complete and little to recommend other than the graphics. Compute! similarly found the graphics and animation "excellent", and noted the "speed and sensitivity" of the sled's controls was appropriate for a joystick. Describing Airheart as "one of the worst games" reviewed that year, Contact found the controls overly difficult, and considered the game did not clearly explain its rules or how to defeat different enemies.
