= Crazy Bone =

Crazy Bone may refer to:

- Krayzie Bone - A member of the rap/hip-hop group Bone Thugs-n-Harmony.
- Gogo's Crazy Bones - small, collectible figurines, popular in the 1990s and 2000s.
- Another term for the funny bone
