= The Dot (book) =

Book by Peter H. Reynolds

- Front cover, designed by Peter H. Reynolds
- Author: Peter H. Reynolds
- Illustrator: Peter H. Reynolds
- Cover artist: Reynolds
- Language: English
- Subject: Art, School, Self-esteem
- Genre: Children's Picture book
- Published: 2003 (Candlewick Press)
- Publication place: United States of America
- Media type: Print (hardcover)
- Pages: 32
- ISBN: 978-0-7636-1961-9
- OCLC: 51093445
- Dewey Decimal: [E] 21
- LC Class: PZ7.R337645 Do 2003

The Dot is a 2003 children's picture book written and illustrated by Peter H. Reynolds. Published by Candlewick Press, it is about a girl named Vashti who discovers her artistic talent.

== Plot ==
Vashti is a girl who believes she can not draw. When her art teacher realizes that she left her assignment blank, Vashti is instructed to just "make a mark and see where it takes you." Vashti is only able to make a small dot on her paper, but to her surprise, the teacher asks her to sign it and displays it in her office the next week. Believing that she can do better than just that, she starts drawing multiple, more elaborate and colorful pieces centered around the dot motif, earning widespread attention and realizing that she is indeed an artist.

The next week during the school art show, Vashti encounters a young boy who believes he can not draw. After he claims that he can not even draw a straight line, Vashti asks him to try his best at making one. While the result is imperfectly squiggly, she nonetheless instructs him to sign it, starting a whole new adventure in the process.

== Legacy ==
The Dot has been adapted into an animated short film on July 1, 2004, produced by Weston Woods Studios and FableVision. It was awarded the 2005 Carnegie Medal for Excellence in Children's Video.

Now educators and students celebrate around the world on September 15 (ish) - International Dot Day, a global celebration of creativity in the classroom based on Peter H. Reynolds' award-winning book.
