= Star Blazer =

Star Blazer may refer to:

- Star Blazer (video game), a 1982 video game for the Apple II home computer
- Starblazer, a science fiction comic anthology that was published between April 1979 and January 1991
- Star Blazers, an American adaptation of the first three seasons of the Japanese animation series "Space Battleship Yamato" (Japanese: 宇宙戦艦ヤマト)
