= PC Globe =

Software atlas

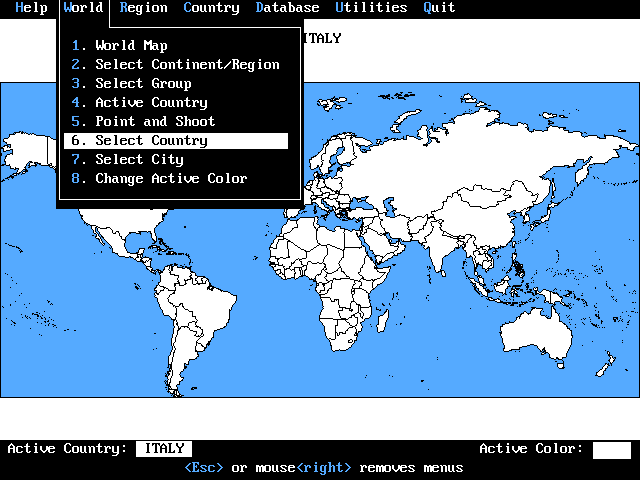
- Version 3.0
- Developer(s): Comwell Systems; PC Globe; Broderbund
- Initial release: 1987
- Stable release: PC Globe Maps-N-Facts / 1994
- Operating system: MS-DOS, Windows 3.X, Macintosh, Atari ST
- Type: Educational
- License: Proprietary

PC Globe is an atlas for MS-DOS, Microsoft Windows, Apple Macintosh and Atari ST, first released in 1987 by Comwell Systems Inc. It offered information on 177 countries and dependencies.

The minimum system requirements of the initial PC version of the software are a IBM PC XT/AT compatible computer running MS-DOS 2.0, 256 KB of RAM and a CGA graphics card. Distributed on multiple floppy disks, the program is divided into several menus that allow to user to access data.

The database includes a geographic map of the world, with the possibility to select the country of interest. For each state there are maps and information (for example, the policy framework, the demographic situation as well as tourist information).

Two related programs, PC Nations, a companion program with flags and anthems of 175 countries and PC USA, focusing only on the United States, were also released.

== Release history ==
=== MS-DOS ===
For MS-DOS, PC Globe was first released in 1987. It was followed by PC Globe-Plus.

PC Globe 3.0 was released in 1989, along with PC Nations and PC USA.

PC Globe 4.0 and PC USA 2.0 were released in 1990. In 1992 PC Globe 5.0 came out, with PC USA 3.0 released the next year.

=== Other systems ===
For the Atari ST, PC Globe 3.0 was released in 1990.

MacGlobe was first released for the Macintosh in 1991 and an updated version in 1992.

PC Globe Maps-N-Facts for Windows and Apple Macintosh was released in 1994.
