= Choplifter HD =

2012 video game

- Promotional art
- Developer: inXile Entertainment
- Publishers: inXile Entertainment; Konami (Xbox 360)
- Series: Choplifter
- Engine: Unreal Engine 3
- Platforms: Windows, PlayStation 3, Xbox 360, Ouya, Android
- Release: January 10, 2012: Windows; PAL: January 10, 2012; NA: January 11, 2012; PlayStation 3; NA: January 10, 2012; PAL: February 29, 2012; Xbox 360 January 11, 2012; Ouya August 27, 2013; Android October 11, 2013
- Genre: Scrolling shooter
- Mode: Single-player

Choplifter HD is a 2012 scrolling shooter video game developed by inXile Entertainment. It is a 3D polygonal remake of the 1982 game Choplifter by Dan Gorlin, whom inXile hired as a design consultant for the remake. As in the original game, players fly missions in a helicopter, defeating enemies and rescuing people.

It was released for Windows, Xbox 360, and PlayStation 3. The game was later ported to Ouya and Android devices. Choplifter HD was praised for staying true to the original and retaining the gameplay the series was known for, but was criticized for its high level of difficulty.

== Gameplay ==
Players take on the role of a helicopter pilot for an elite rescue squad known as Coordinated Helicopter Operations, Preservation and Rescue (C.H.O.P.R.). The game retains the same basic objectives as the original Choplifter, including the classic side-scrolling gameplay, but now features 3D polygonal graphics. Choplifter HD offers three main campaigns and 30 different missions, along with a tutorial level. The player completes missions by piloting the helicopter into hostile territory while evading or destroying enemies and managing the helicopter's depleting fuel supply, which can be replenished either at the helicopter's home base or at fuel depots scattered throughout the level. Missions typically involve picking up and dropping off various passengers. New features include passengers who can die and are associated with a timer, as well as zombie enemies. Levels now feature enemies in the foreground, which can only be defeated by facing them directly. Players can also unlock improved helicopters by collecting stars in each mission. Three difficulty modes are available, with the higher difficulties making enemies more challenging to defeat and causing the helicopter's fuel to deplete faster.

== Development ==
The game was announced in March 2011 for release on PlayStation 3 (via the PlayStation Network) and Windows. An Xbox Live Arcade release was confirmed the following June. inXile founder Brian Fargo was a fan of the original Choplifter, having played the game on the Apple II. The original game's designer, Dan Gorlin, served as a design consultant for Choplifter HD, and Fargo credited Gorlin with contributions such as "connect(ing) the pilot to the rescued hostages in a meaningful way".

Originally slated for release in Fall 2011, the game was delayed to a winter release, with Konami signing on to publish the Xbox Live Arcade version.

== Reception ==
Reception

Aggregate score
Aggregator	Score		
Aggregator	PC	PS3	Xbox 360
Metacritic	65/100	71/100	65/100

Review scores
Publication	Score		
Publication	PC	PS3	Xbox 360
1Up.com	B	B	B
Destructoid	N/A	N/A	7/10
Electronic Gaming Monthly	N/A	N/A	6.5/10
Eurogamer	N/A	N/A	7/10
GameSpot	N/A	N/A	5.5/10
IGN	8/10	8/10	8/10
Official Xbox Magazine (US)	N/A	N/A	4.5/10
PC Gamer (UK)	59%	N/A	N/A
PlayStation: The Official Magazine	N/A	8/10	N/A
TeamXbox	N/A	N/A	6.5/10
Maxim	N/A	8/10	8/10
Metro	N/A	N/A	6/10

Choplifter HD received "mixed or average reviews" on all platforms according to the review aggregation website Metacritic. Several reviewers, such as Destructoid's Maurice Tan and GameSpot's Sean Evans, praised the game for its faithfullness to the original game, but was criticized for its difficulty, particularly the relentless incoming fire from enemies, which Ryan Winterhalter of 1Up.com compared to that of a bullet hell shooter. While Evans opined that game's difficulty will deter players from playing further, Winterhalter called Choplifter HD "the ideal game for perfectionists with a flair for self-flagellation". Despite this, some reviewers felt that the difficulty enhanced the game's enjoyment, with Christian Donlan of Eurogamer calling it "pleasantly punishing" and Mitch Dyer of IGN commenting that "frustrations are rare in Choplifter HD because its constant concern is that you're having a good time".
