= Whistler's Brother =

1984 video game

- Publisher: Broderbund
- Designer: Louis Ewens
- Platforms: Atari 8-bit, Commodore 64
- Release: 1984
- Genre: Platform

Whistler's Brother is a platform game designed by Louis Ewens and published in 1984 by Broderbund for the Atari 8-bit computers and Commodore 64.

== Gameplay ==
The player is ascending the ladder, while their brother, not paying attention, continues moving ahead. (Atari 8-bit screenshot)

In Whistler's Brother, the player controls not only his character, but also his thoughtless brother. By pressing the fire button, the player character whistles so that his brother (who is not taking his eyes off the map) knows which direction to follow him. Proper timing is important, as failing to whistle will cause the player's brother to go the wrong way and possibly die. The player is tasked with retracing the path of his brother's last expedition and recovering the lost manuscript, artifacts and tools he left behind.

The game consists of 13 chapters, with the first chapter beginning on a pier where the player must board a ship sailing to South America. In each subsequent chapter, the player will find tools or artifacts that, when collected, give a special power: a spinning that will make the player's character immune to all dangers in his path.

== Reception ==
Whistler's Brother received fairly positive reviews. Zzap!64 reviewer concluded that "Overall this is an excellent game". Commodore Power/Play, Tom Benford praised the longevity of the game: "Each chapter has its own intricacies, idiosyncrasies, dangers and strategies, so Whistler's Brother will sustain your interest for a long, long time. It's not a game you're going to master in an hour – or ten, for that matter." Antic's Jack Powell praised the graphics and animation, but complained about the annoying sound and less than adequate documentation.
