= Apocalypse (1994 video game) =

1994 video game

- Developer: Miracle Games
- Publisher: Virgin Interactive Entertainment
- Platform: Amiga
- Release: 1994
- Genre: Shoot 'em up
- Mode: Single-player

Apocalypse is a 1994 shoot 'em up video game developed by Miracle Games and published by Virgin Interactive. Released for the Amiga, the game places the player in control of a combat helicopter tasked with completing missions in enemy territory and rescuing prisoners of war while engaging a variety of enemy units such as tanks, helicopters, and fortified positions.

The game has received mostly positive reviews. Across them, Apocalypse was frequently praised for its graphics, sound design, and atmospheric presentation, but criticized for its high difficulty, control issues, and reliance on trial-and-error gameplay.

== Gameplay ==
Apocalypse is a side-scrolling helicopter shooter in which the player pilots a helicopter across hostile environments, engaging enemy forces and rescuing hostages. Missions involve objectives such as destroying enemy installations, avoiding anti-aircraft fire, and extracting civilians or prisoners from enemy bases. The game features multi-directional parallax scrolling, with layered backgrounds aiming to create a sense of movement and depth during flight. Dense environmental detail and jungle-themed visuals were designed to evoke a cinematic war setting reminiscent of contemporary Vietnam War films; the game's title and cover art is lifted from Francis Ford Coppola's Apocalypse Now, although the in-game setting is a fictional island of Majipoor.

The player must land near destroyed buildings to collect hostages, while managing the helicopter's limited carrying capacity. In some missions, rescuing wounded personnel requires first picking up medical staff from a designated base, who then transport injured individuals to safety. Wounded allies remain on the battlefield until rescued, encouraging players to prioritize evacuation and support roles in addition to combat. Enemy forces include ground troops armed with heavy weapons, tanks, and opposing aircraft. Some levels feature off-screen artillery, such as missile launchers and howitzers that fire high-speed shells across the map, requiring the player to locate and destroy them before they can be safely approached. Enemy fire realistically affects all units in the game world, allowing hostile attacks to damage both enemy forces and friendly units, including hostages. Some missions are structured in multiple phases, requiring the player to complete sequential objectives such as rescuing hostages, destroying enemy installations, and clearing the battlefield before progressing.

The helicopter is equipped with multiple weapon types, including machine guns, rockets, air-to-air missiles, and mines, each suited for different combat situations. Ammunition can be replenished by collecting supply drops that periodically appear during gameplay. The game emphasizes careful planning, as rushing objectives can lead to failure due to the constant threat of enemy fire. For example, players may need to eliminate hidden lookouts before attempting rescues, as failure to do so can trigger enemy reinforcements that attack during extraction and increase casualties.

The game permits multiple attempts at missions, effectively allowing players to continue after being destroyed, though repeated failures may require restarting earlier progress. as the game does not have a save progress feature.

== Development and release ==
Apocalypse was developed by Miracle Games and published by Virgin Interactive Entertainment for the Amiga in 1994.

== Reception ==
Reception

Review scores
Publication	Score
Świat Gier Komputerowych	8/10
CU Amiga	49%
Power Play	64%
Amiga Computing	66%
Amiga Format	66%
Amiga Joker	85%
Amiga Power	80%
Génération 4	80%
The One Amiga	80%
Amiga Dream	81%

Apocalypse received mixed to positive reviews from critics.

Tina Hackett of Amiga Computing praised the game's graphics and sound design, noting its strong atmosphere and detailed presentation, but criticized its high difficulty, lack of save function, and occasionally confusing visual layering. The review also found the control scheme somewhat awkward, particularly due to overlapping functions assigned to the same input.

A review in the French magazine Amiga Dream described Apocalypse as a competent and enjoyable action game, noting its solid execution and accessible gameplay. The review also observed that the game was not particularly original, characterizing it as a derivative but well-made entry in the genre.

Rob Mead of Amiga Format praised the game's blend of action and tactical elements, describing it as an engaging and accessible experience that remained challenging over time. The review highlighted the game's atmosphere, environmental variety, and sense of involvement, concluding that "Apocalypse is a sexy, rip-roaring, shoot-em-up with a strong element of tactical awareness. Very good."

Stuart Campbell of Amiga Power criticized the game for relying heavily on luck rather than skill, arguing that unpredictable hazards could prevent fair progression. The review also noted the limited number of levels and repetitive gameplay, describing the experience as visually appealing but ultimately lacking depth.

Richard Löwenstein of the German Amiga Joker magazine saw the gameplay as inspired by Choplifter. He praised the game's animation (with the caveat that "the shockingly gory death falls of riddled soldiers are a matter of taste"), parallax scrolling, and sound design, describing it as atmospheric and technically impressive. However, the review noted shortcomings such as limited features, lack of save functionality, and a high difficulty level that could frustrate less experienced players. He concluded that despite some shortcomings, "Virgin has thus succeeded in creating an atmospherically dense and enormously playable shooter game".

A review in CU Amiga criticized the game for relying heavily on luck rather than player skill, in contrast to similar titles such as Choplifter. The reviewer found the game frustratingly difficult, with enemies capable of destroying the player quickly and limited opportunities for recovery. The controls were noted as functional but somewhat unresponsive, with delays in helicopter movement affecting gameplay. Despite these criticisms, the review praised the game's visual presentation, particularly its animation and use of parallax scrolling. In the end, the reviewer concluded that the game "undoubted good looks" but is too difficult.

The German magazine Power Play noted that the game combined visually appealing presentation with frustrating gameplay design. The review highlighted the high difficulty level and the extent to which success could depend on chance rather than player skill. The controls and flight mechanics were described as imprecise, making it difficult to maneuver effectively under pressure, particularly when reacting to sudden threats such as enemy fire or off-screen attacks. This lack of responsiveness was cited as a major unhelpful factor contributing to the game's difficulty. Despite these issues, Power Play acknowledged the game's technical strengths, including its detailed graphics and smooth animation, though these were not considered sufficient to offset its gameplay shortcomings.

Thierry Falcoz of French Génération 4 described Apocalypse as an enjoyable and technically accomplished game, praising its graphics and sound design and noting that it offered a polished arcade-style experience. The review, however, criticized the game for its lack of originality, describing it as heavily derivative of earlier titles such as Choplifter, and noted that its limited variety reduced its long-term appeal. Despite these criticisms, the game was considered accessible and well-executed, with responsive controls and strong audiovisual presentation contributing to its overall appeal.

Arkadiusz Matczyński reviewed the game for the Polish magazine Świat Gier Komputerowych. His review highlighted the game's challenging missions, varied weapon systems, and visually appealing graphics and sound, while noting its high difficulty level, awarding the game the score of 80%.

The May 1994 issue of The One Amiga described Apocalypse as a game whose flaws initially outweigh its strengths, but which remains compelling to play. The review attributed its appeal to satisfying combat, the inherent strengths of the Choplifter-style gameplay formula, and a challenging difficulty curve that rewards careful target prioritization. According to the reviewer, while early encounters may appear unfair, persistence reveals a more structured and learnable system. Criticism focused on the limited content, particularly the presence of only five missions and the frustrating lack of a save game feature, which requires players to replay earlier levels repeatedly. Although the game was considered enjoyable and well-designed in parts, these limitations were seen as reducing its long-term appeal.

Apocalypse was reviewed in a number of other contemporary magazines and outlets, including Amiga Games, Computer and Video Games, Datormagazin, High Score, and Score.

== See also ==
- Choplifter
