= Personal Preference =

Board game

Personal Preference is a 1987 board game created by Donal Carlston that involves guessing the order in which a player prefers foods, activities, people, and other items compared to one another. The game was published by Broderbund in the United States, Playtoy Industries in Canada, and Parker Brothers International in Britain.

An updated version by the original creator was launched on Kickstarter on May 1, 2023. The new version contains updated cultural references and new categories.

== Original 1987 Version ==
The game contains cards in four categories: Food & Drink, Activities, People, and Potpourri (miscellaneous). Each card has a photo or drawing on each side and text indicating what that side represents (e.g., chocolate éclairs, climbing a mountain, Harrison Ford, spy novels). Each round, one player draws four cards from one category, or one from each category, depending on the player's position on the board. Each card is placed in a colored quadrant of the board. The player then ranks these four items according to his or her preference using color-coded cards that are placed in an envelope. Next, other players (or teams) use numbered tiles to guess that player's order, and move forward one space for each correct guess when the order is revealed. If players choose to double a guess by placing a tile towards the center of the board, they move forward two spaces if correct and back one space if incorrect. Players take turns drawing and ranking cards until someone reaches the end of the board.

== Reviews ==
- Games #89
- Best Games of 1988 in Games #94
