= Peter H. Reynolds =

Canadian author and illustrator of children's books

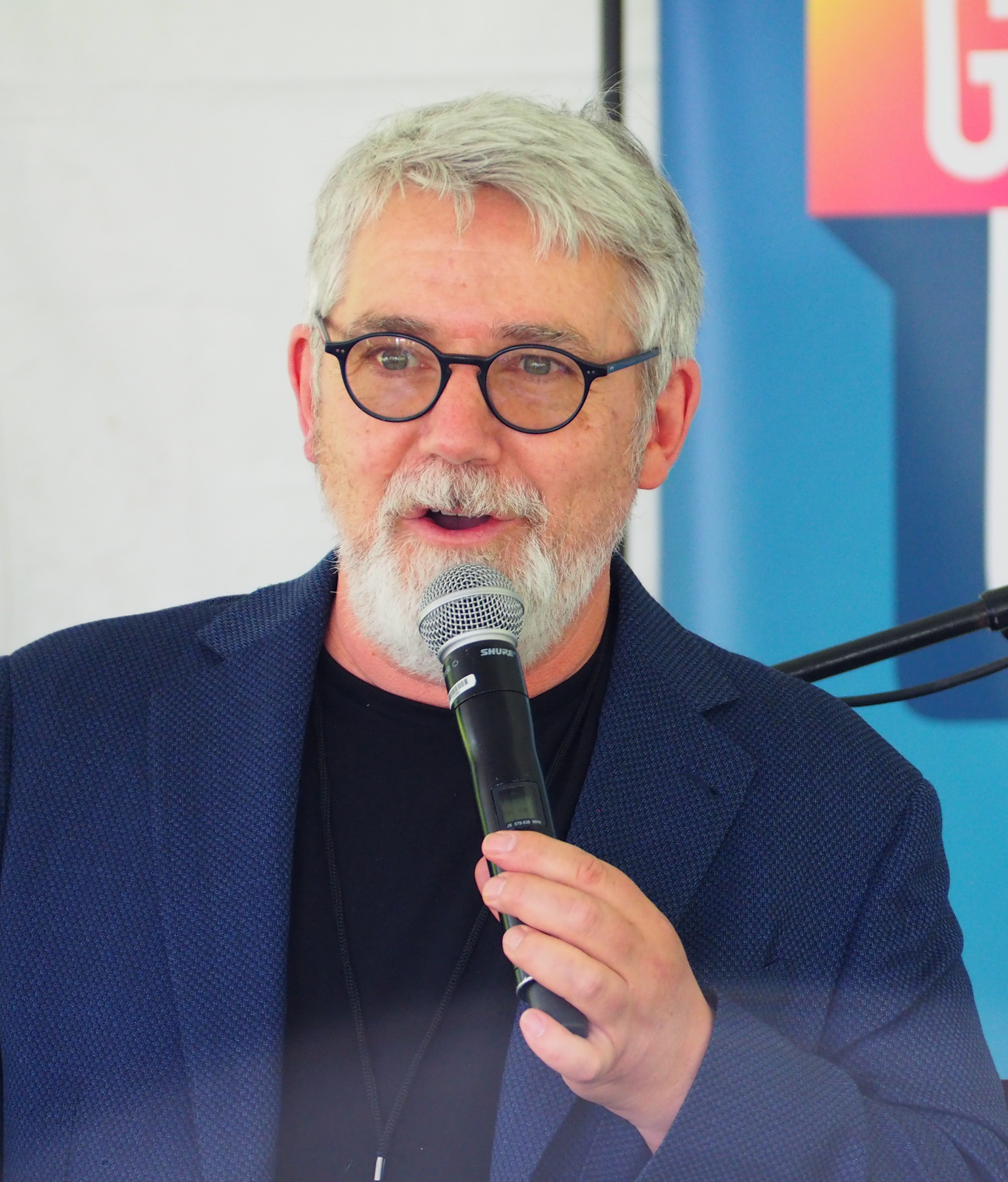
Peter Hamilton Reynolds

Peter Hamilton Reynolds is a Canadian author and illustrator of children's books and is the founder of the educational media company FableVision.

== Life ==
Reynolds was born in 1961 in Canada with his identical twin brother, Paul, who collaborates as author on several children's books (Going Places, Full STEAM Ahead), and is CEO of the Reynolds educational media firm FableVision. He attended the Massachusetts College of Art and Fitchburg State College where he received the Communications Student of The Year Award in 1983, Alumni Recognition Award in 1999 and was awarded the title Litterarum Humanarum Doctor (L.H.D) in 2007 for his "substantial contributions to education and the arts".

Reynolds is best known for his children's books about "authentic learning, creativity and self-expression", including The North Star, Ish, The Dot, and So Few of Me. The Dot, published by Candlewick Press, has been published in over twenty languages, as well as in Braille, and has won a number of awards, including the Oppenheim Platinum Toy Award, Borders Books' Original Voices 2003 Award, and the Christopher Medal, as well as the American Library Association's 2005 Carnegie Medal of Excellence for the book's animated adaptation. Reynolds has also published a book series for young children, based on the character "SugarLoaf". Published by Simon & Schuster, the first two books in this series are titled My Very Big Little World and The Best Kid in the World. Reynolds's award-winning publishing work also includes the best-selling Judy Moody series written by Megan McDonald, Eleanor Estes's The Alley and The Tunnel of Hugsy Goode, Judy Blume's Fudge series, and Ellen Potter's Olivia Kidney books. His collaboration with Alison McGhee called Someday spent two months on the New York Times Best Seller list for Children's Books.

In addition to his children's books, Reynolds also created the award-winning animated short films, The Blue Shoe and Living Forever, as well as the film adaptations of his books The Dot and Ish.

Together with the Burkinabe model and activist, Georgie Badiel, he has co-created "Water Princess" which tells the story of Badiel's homeland of Burkina Faso's need for aquifers. The book was released in the Spring of 2016.

Reynolds lives in Dedham, Massachusetts and is the co-owner of his family's book store, The Blue Bunny Bookstore, and is the founder of the civic-powered revitalization group Dedham Square Circle. He is a Distinguished Eagle Scout.
