= La Guerre des clans =

- Genre: Game show
- Based on: Family Feud by Mark Goodson
- Presented by: Luc Senay; Jean-François Baril; Jean-François Breau
- Country of origin: Canada
- Original language: French

Production
- Production locations: Télé-Québec studios Montreal, Quebec (2009–2017)
- Running time: 30 minutes

Original release
- Network: V
- Release: August 31, 1992 – May 23, 1997
- Release: August 31, 2009 – 2017
- Release: September 17, 2018 – 2019

Related
- Family Feud; Family Feud Canada

La Guerre des clans (The Clan Wars/The War of the Clans) is a Canadian French language television game show based on the American series Family Feud and was hosted by Luc Senay. It was taped at TQS in Montreal and ran from 1992 to 1997.

Like Family Feud, La Guerre des clans pits two families against each other in a contest to name the most popular responses to a survey-type question.

On August 31, 2009, V (formerly TQS) brought back the show with Jean-François Baril as host, taped at the Télé-Québec studios in Montreal, Quebec. Baril has hosted the show until 2017. On February 21, 2018, it was announced that the show would come back after a brief hiatus with Jean-François Breau as the new host.

On April 12, 2019; it has been announced that La Guerre des Clans had been cancelled, with the network stating that low viewership in the 18–49 key demographic was the culprit. Reruns of the show remain in V's daytime lineup.

Later in the same year, an English-spoken adaptation Family Feud Canada hosted by Gerry Dee aired on CBC. Its debut was on December 16, 2019.

== Gameplay ==
The game is administered like the U.S. version of the game. The first three questions were worth single points. Question four has double points. All points in the fifth round and up are tripled. A "stealing" family would be credited for a "steal" answer. The first team to reach 300 points wins the game and plays the bonus round.

=== Bonus Round ===
The winning family goes on to play the bonus round, which is basically the same as Fast Money on the American series. The captain chooses two family members to play the round. One family member leaves the stage and is placed in an isolation booth, while the other is given 20 seconds (15 seconds on the 1992–97 version) to answer five questions. The clock begins counting down after the host finishes reading the first question. If he or she cannot think of something, he or she may say pass, and the host will come back to it if there's time left. The number of people giving each answer is revealed once all five answers are given or time has expired, whichever comes first. The player earns one point for each person that gave the same answer; at least two people must have given that answer for it to score.

Once all the points for the first player are tallied, the second family member comes back on stage with the first contestant's answers covered and is given 25 seconds (20 seconds in the first version) to answer the same five questions. If the second player gives the same answer as the first player on a question, a double buzzer will sound, and the host will ask for another response.

If one or both family members accumulate a total of 200 points or more, the family wins CA$2,000; starting in the second week of the 2009 run, it was a cash prize that starts at $2,000 and increases by $500 every time it was not won. Anything under 200 points means they get $3 a point. Starting on September 17, 2013, if the first contestant answers with all #1 answers, they win $1,000 bonus regardless of the outcome. Comedian Alexandre Barrette was the very first contestant to accomplish this feat, which happened on a special celebrity episode of the show. Families can stay for up to five shows.

== Production ==
The set for La Guerre des clans from 1992–95 resembled the then-running (1988–94) United States version set. From 1995 to the end of the first run, the colors changed: the border of the survey board went to gold, while the background was blue and the face-off podium was blue along with its logo in the middle.

== Merchandise ==
There were two board games based on the show that were released by two different companies at the time. The first version based on the original 1992–1997 TQS run was released by Playtoy Industries in 1993. Minus the design of the survey board (similarly but not quite looking to that of Family Fortunes) and the brick wall pattern replacing the stairs artwork, the cover art looks rather similar to the Pressman/Croner versions from the US in 1990 and Australia in 1989 respectively. Seventeen years later, a new version based on the former 2009 V run was released by a new toy company called Éditions Gladius International, Inc. in 2010.
