= Galactic Empire (1980 video game) =

- Developer: Broderbund
- Publishers: Broderbund; Adventure International
- Platforms: Apple II, Atari 8-bit, TRS-80, Classic Mac OS
- Release: 1980: TRS-80; 1981: Atari 8-bit 1994: Mac
- Genre: Strategy
- Mode: Single-player

Galactic Empire is a strategy video game written by Doug Carlston for the TRS-80 and released 1980. It is the first game in the Galactic Saga and became first game published by Broderbund which was, in fact, created for the purpose of publishing the game. Galactic Empire was ported to the Apple II and Atari 8-bit computers and followed by three sequels. The game was also published by Adventure International.

== Description ==
Doug Carlston was an attorney who wrote Galactic Empire on his TRS-80. Adventure International was the original publisher; after his brother Gary began successfully selling the game to computer stores, they founded Broderbund.

Many of the locations have names taken from African languages, such as Afrikaans or Swahili, based on Carlston's years in Africa. The game navigation uses a list of planets with names beginning with a unique letter of the alphabet for easy access. The 'R' key is reserved for 'Return', and 'Q' for 'Quit.' The player has one fleet which travels from planet to planet, beginning with the home world 'Galactica.' Conquered planets can be taxed and produce troops used to take other planets. Each planet has a technology level above or below Galactica standard, which makes it easier or harder to conquer. It takes time to travel between planets to collect taxes and troops to conquer new planets. The player has 999 years to take the galaxy.

== Reception ==
J. Mishcon reviewed Galactic Empire in The Space Gamer No. 30. He commented that "Galactic Empire provides hours of play, but they can be frustrating and tedious hours. It is too easy to beat the system, and the game cannot be saved. A mediocre buy." 80 Micro in 1981 called Galactic Empire "one of the best game programs currently available for the TRS-80". The magazine described the game as "well designed and fun to play", stated that it "is never dull" with replayability from a random map generator, and approved of the addition of a save function on newer versions given that a session could last up to six hours. It concluded, "I heartily recommend Galactic Empire to anyone seeking a complex, intelligent, and of course, fun program."

== Legacy ==
A Macintosh port was released by Cary Torkelson in 1994, with permission from Doug Carlston.

Subsequent games in the Galactic Saga are Galactic Trader (no relation to the later Galactic Trader game by Stephan Meier), Galactic Revolution, and Tawala's Last Redoubt.
