= Captain Goodnight and the Islands of Fear =

1985 action video game

- Developer: Broderbund
- Publisher: Broderbund
- Platform: Apple II
- Release: 1985
- Genre: Action

Captain Goodnight and the Islands of Fear is a 1985 action video game by Broderbund. It was released on the Apple II in English and French. The player must traverse air, sea and land in jets, jeeps, tanks, trams, boats, submarines, and on foot to advance toward enemy territory, the goal being deactivating the Doomsday Device on Doom Island. Along the way, enemy forces attempt to stop the captain.

== Plot ==
F.O.G. HQ has been given an ultimatum: either give 200 billion dollars to the Federation of Evil, or the free world will be destroyed. It is up to Captain Roscoe “Buzz” Goodnight to destroy the doomsday device before it can be activated. The hero, Captain Goodnight, is a cross between "Biggles, James Bond and Hannay".

== Gameplay ==
After a short briefing, Captain Goodnight is dropped off at an airfield where he begins his journey to find and destroy Doctor Maybe's Doomsday machine. The player has 24 in-game hours to accomplish this, represented by a timer that counts down from 24 "hours" at a rate of one minute every real time second, though an in-game cheat could be used to give the player 100 "hours", making it virtually impossible to lose. Along the way, Goodnight encounters various enemy vehicles and robots. Being hit by any of these will knock Goodnight down, but he simply dusts himself off and jumps back into the fray, meaning the player has effectively unlimited lives. However, each time this happens, one hour is deducted from the timer. If the timer reaches zero before Goodnight can destroy the Doomsday machine, Maybe activates it, destroying the world and ending the game in failure.

== Development ==
The game was designed to be "loaded with humor".

Roland Gustafsson provided the protection schemes for this game.

== Reception ==
Video game reviewer Reggie C. deemed it "One of my favorite games from the Apple era", adding that it has "less than an hours worth of action" and is "crazy hard". InThe80s said the game "showed the foregrounds to Austin Powers", while Unwinnable Weekly deemed it "pulpy but incredibly difficult". Vintage Game Consoles said the game "impressed with its rich cinematic, multistage gameplay". The Australian Apple Review wrote that the game "is very nearly the ultimate that can be achieved with current technology on computer". Finnish Retro Game Comparison Blog deemed it a "brilliantly parodic tribute to James Bond". PC Magazine deemed it one of the Apple II's best exclusive games.

The game was listed at #16 in Billboard's list of Top Computer Software for the week ending September 4, 1985.
