= Dan Gorlin =

American computer game programmer and designer

Dan Gorlin is a video game programmer and designer best known for his 1982 Apple II game Choplifter, in which the player pilots a helicopter to rescue hostages. His next Apple II game, Airheart (1987), took three years to complete. While technically advanced, it was not as well received as Choplifter. He wrote the sequel to Airheart for the Atari ST: Typhoon Thompson in Search for the Sea Child (1988). All three games were published by Broderbund.

Gorlin teaches and performs West African dance-drumming with Alokli West African Dance, an organization which he has directed since 1985.

== Career ==
Gorlin accidentally got into game development. While living in Los Angeles working for the RAND Corporation researching artificial intelligence, he borrowed an Apple II from his grandfather. While trying to sell his house and sitting at home for six months, out of sheer boredom, he started writing a game that drew on his affinity for helicopters. A local kid doing odd jobs for Gorlin suggested he should add men to pick up, like in Defender. What resulted from his changes became his seminal game Choplifter. Gorlin completed the game in six months.

Gorlin's next game, Airheart, also for the Apple II, took three years to complete. The following game, Typhoon Thompson, took about two years, but Gorlin admits that the development of these games overlapped somewhat. The development for these games took so long because Gorlin started other games in between—a black hole game and a seaplane game—which proved too ambitious and which he ended up abandoning. During this time, however, he built a lot of tools whose descendants he still uses today.

During this time, Gorlin was an independent developer with an informal relationship with Broderbund, who published his first game. Being his own boss, Gorlin never felt pressure to finish anything, so a lot of concepts he abandoned, though he thought they would make good games. He just got bored with developing them and said that if he had the modern equivalent of a game producer pressuring him, he might have actually finished them. He concedes that with a corporate structure, he probably never would have had the freedom to develop his fledgling "experiments" in the first place.

Airheart was the realization of Gorlin's dream of making a 3D game, which Choplifter was originally intended to be. Typhoon Thompson was an even further pursuit of this goal, but his full dream was too ambitious for production milestones and current technology. During this time he also developed the Amiga conversion of Prince of Persia.

Once the Apple II became outdated, Gorlin says he could not figure out what its successor was going to be. He says that he was hoping the Macintosh or Amiga would emerge as the new dominant system, but was disappointed that neither did. He investigated MS-DOS, but was disgusted with the hardware limitations. He says he decided to "wait it out" and went back to teaching African music and culture, which he had been doing since 1972.

Gorlin became interested in game development again around 1995, with the introduction of Windows 95 and DirectX. He became the Director of Software Development for Gravity, Inc. in San Francisco, California. He pursued putting together a development team with Victor Mercieca. What became of that venture was never publicly disclosed, but in late 1997 it leaked to the press that Gorlin had founded a development team called Ariok Entertainment and was working on a 3D Choplifter game for PC. This game was never released.

Gorlin was a consultant for Choplifter HD in 2011, and was exploring the idea of developing games for the Android platform.
