= 3D Home Architect =

Windows software

- Logo of Deluxe 4.0 (2001)
- Developer: Broderbund
- Release: 1992
- Operating system: Windows

3D Home Architect is a CD-ROM software from Broderbund.

== Functions ==
3D Home Architect lets a user design a house from scratch, plan an addition to the user's present home, or map out a renovation.

== Development ==
3D Home Architect was co-developed by Jack Simpson, Chief Technical Officer at Advanced Relational Technology Inc. 3D Home Architect Deluxe 4.0 was released in May 2001.

== Reception ==
CNET said "Making a complicated job like house design easy enough for an amateur is no small feat, but 3D Home Architect succeeds. So what's keeping you? Start designing that dream house right away". Kids Domain called 3D Home Architect a wise investment of your time.

3D Home Architect ranked 14th on PC Data's list of Top-Selling Personal Productivity Software for July 1997. 3D Home Architect won the Editors' Choice award from PC Magazine.
