= SAPIEN Technologies, Inc. =

American software company

Coordinates: 38°17′47″N 122°17′29″W

SAPIEN Technologies is a privately held software company based in Napa, California. Founded in 1986, the company has produced a number of commercial software products under contract from various publishers, as well as its own commercial software products.

== History ==
SAPIEN Technologies started as Group Telein, founded by Paul Lamoreux, David Gaertner, and Ferdinand G. Rios. Lamoreux and Gaertner were Computer Science undergraduates at University of California Berkeley; Rios has a Ph.D. in Forensic Science. Group Telein was a small computer consulting firm with the stated goal of creating their own software products. However, to begin realizing income more quickly, the three began offering simple computer consulting services, including assisting individuals with personal computer setup, office computer setup, and so forth. The personal computer was only about 6 years old at the time, and computers were often significantly more complex and difficult to set up and maintain than today.

Lamoreux's father was a bio-mechanical engineer, and had developed a device to measure knee laxity (how loosely the tibia was attached to the knee joint). The device was to be the first of its kind to feed diagnostic data directly to a computer in real-time, and Lamoreux was offered the opportunity to write the companion software. Group Telein wrote the software in Turbo Pascal, eventually moving their operations from their individual residences to an office in downtown Berkeley, California. The knee device was successful, and led to other projects. By 1989, the company had seven employees, but only a single major client.

The bio-mechanical company decided to slow down software development, resulting in an almost total loss of revenue for Group Telein. After Group Telein laid off all of the company's employees, Gaertner, who had just graduated from UC Berkeley, accepted a position with IBM. Rios and Lamoreux decided to incorporate under a new name, SAPIEN Technologies, in 1990.

Along with two former employees, Tracy Elmore and Alex Zeltser, SAPIEN decided to work on their first in-house software product, a language-independent programming editor called ECOS, designed for Microsoft Windows v2.0. The product received a lukewarm reception at the company's first tradeshow; programmers at the time were accustomed to writing programs for Microsoft Windows, but did so in a DOS-based development environment. Without any income coming from the product, Elmore and Zeltser decided to seek other employment. Elmore eventually accepted a position with Berkeley Systems, which at the time was a Macintosh software development company seeking to begin Windows development.

Rios and Lamoreux continued to work on small projects to generate revenue; Elmore recommended SAPIEN as a contractor with Windows development experience to help Berkeley Systems develop modules for their popular After Dark screen saver product. SAPIEN developed More After Dark and After Dark: Star Trek Edition for Berkeley Systems. SAPIEN continued to increase both their revenue and their staff through 1992, when the company entered into an agreement with PixelLite to create a vector-based print publishing application similar to the popular PrintShop software. PixelLite was owned by the original creators of Print Shop, which had by then been sold to Broderbund Software. Elmore was hired back from Berkeley Systems to help with the new product, which was originally named InstantArtist (InstantArtist was originally published by Autodesk Corporation, then by Maxis Software under the name PrintArtist; Maxis was purchased by Sierra, which still publishes PrintArtist).

From 1992 to 1997, SAPIEN developed software for other companies, including Individual Software, Viacom Entertainment, Illumina Productions, and others; the company entered into a five-year agreement with Rand McNally to design and develop their TripMaker software. Zeltser came back to SAPIEN to head development on TripMaker, eventually producing not only that product but also StreetFinder and New Millennium World Atlas for Rand McNally. Alex Riedel joined the staff in 1997 to work on the World Atlas product. As the five-year agreement with Rand McNally neared its end, however, Lamoreux and Rios decided to discontinue all development contracts, downsize the staff, and begin developing SAPIEN's own products.

While still living in Germany, Riedel had published a shareware Windows-based programming editor called ARIS Edit. SAPIEN came to an agreement to use the source code of ARIS Edit to produce SAPIEN's own programming editor. Because Windows-based editors were plentiful in the market, SAPIEN focused on a new language being produced by Microsoft: Visual Basic Scripting Edition, or VBScript. SAPIEN's editor was named PrimalScript 1.0, and it focused primarily on providing an integrated development environment for VBScript.

In 2004, SAPIEN acquired ScriptingAnswers.com and began expanding from a single-product software company to a larger product portfolio focused on scripting and software development.

== Products ==
SAPIEN's products fall into four basic categories:

Software Includes the PrimalScript script development environment and the PrimalScope Windows script debugger.

Publishing The company publishes scripting-related books under the SAPIEN Press brand name.

Community The company supports free community Web sites related to scripting, including ScriptingAnswers.com and SearchScripting.com.

Training The company's training products, including instructor-led training and ScriptingAnswers.com-branded self-based training, are consolidated into a single training Web site.

== Trivia ==
- The company's name came from an informal discussion between Lamoreux and Rios, based on Homo sapiens. The company occasionally uses the tagline, "Way Better Than Apes" in its advertising and promotions.
