= Alien Tales =

1995 video game

- Developer: Brøderbund Software
- Publisher: Brøderbund Software
- Platforms: Windows, Macintosh
- Release: Windows 1995; Macintosh 1996
- Genre: Educational

Alien Tales (also released as Reading Galaxy) is a 1995 video game developed and published by Brøderbund Software for Windows and Macintosh. It is an educational video game in which younger players participate in a game show aimed at answering questions based on classic children's literature.

== Gameplay ==
Gameplay screenshot

Players complete a series of minigames set in a game show format. In the first round of the game (either 'To Tale The Truth' or 'Ganymede Squares', based on Celebrity Squares), players select an author such as Mark Twain, Roald Dahl or Jules Verne, are provided a brief biography, and must answer questions about the author and the book they have written. Each correct answer allows players to assemble a puzzle depicting a scene from the book. In the second round, players must fill in words in a crossword in a time limit based on passages taken from the book of the selected author. In the third round, players wager points named Starbucks earned in the first two rounds, and play either 'Meteor Match', where they match facts to the author, or 'Stump the Human', by completing a cryptogram.

== Development and release ==
Broderbund announced Alien Tales at the Winter Consumer Electronics Show. In 1996, DIC Entertainment planned a children's television series based on the software.

== Reception ==
Reception

Review scores
Publication	Score
CD-ROM	4/5
Macworld	4/5

Alien Tales received positive reviews upon release. Macworld considered the game to be engaging for younger players and assist their enthusiasm in reading comprehension of classic novels. Describing the title as "surprisingly fun" with "gorgeous" graphics and "great" sound effects, Computer Game Review appreciated the game exposed younger readers to texts they may not have read before.
