= Typhoon Thompson =

1988 video game

- Developer: Dan Gorlin Productions
- Publisher: Broderbund
- Designer: Dan Gorlin
- Platforms: Amiga, Atari ST
- Release: 1988
- Genre: Action
- Mode: Single-player

Typhoon Thompson in Search for the Sea Child is a video game created by Dan Gorlin. It was published by Broderbund for the Atari ST in 1988, then the Amiga in 1990. Typhoon Thompson is a reworking of the Apple II game Airheart, also written by Gorlin.

== Reception ==
Antic in November 1988 praised the Atari ST version of Typhoon Thompson's graphics and playability.

The game was ranked the 24th best game of all time by Amiga Power.
