= Logical Journey of the Zoombinis =

1996 video game

- Developers: Broderbund (v1); The Learning Company (v2.0)
- Publishers: Broderbund (v1); The Learning Company (v2.0)
- Designers: Chris Hancock; Scot Osterweil
- Programmer: Michael C. Rivard
- Writers: Karen Boylan; Dennis Leahy; Chris Hancock; Scot Osterweil; Jonelle Adkisson
- Composer: Jonelle Adkisson
- Series: Zoombinis
- Platforms: Windows, Mac OS, OS X
- Release: 26 February 1996
- Genres: Educational, puzzle
- Mode: Single-player

Logical Journey of the Zoombinis (also known as Zoombinis Logical Journey and Zoombinis) is an educational puzzle video game developed and published by Broderbund for the original and The Learning Company for the rerelease. It is the first game in the Zoombinis video game series.

== Gameplay ==
The Zoombini select screen at the start of each adventure

The Zoombinis are a species of small blue creatures depicted with varying facial features, initially living in prosperous peace on a small island called Zoombini Isle. Later they are tricked and enslaved by their neighbors, the Bloats. The game depicts the Zoombinis' search for a new home, featuring a variety of logical puzzles which the player must solve to get the Zoombinis to their new home. Most of the puzzles involve the physical features of the Zoombinis as part of the solution. For example, in the puzzle 'Allergic Cliffs', the player is given a choice of 2 bridges, each of which will allow Zoombinis to pass only if they have certain combinations of features. In total, there are 625 unique combinations, of which the game allows to make up to two Zoombinis (twins) with each combination, making 1,250 possible Zoombinis in total. Of these, 625 must be saved in order to finish the game.

The Zoombinis travel in groups of a maximum of 16 across a series of puzzles. There are 12 puzzles in total, split into four sections of 3 puzzles each, and the Zoombinis must complete a path of 9 puzzles to establish their new home at 'Zoombiniton' ('Zoombiniville' in US version). The first and last 'legs' are compulsory and must be completed by all Zoombinis; for the second leg, the player is given a choice to take either the north or the south path. Between each 'leg' is a campsite where the Zoombinis can be stored for later retrieval.

The first time the player successfully brings an entire party of 16 Zoombinis through a leg, a building will be constructed at Zoombiniton/Zoombiniville to celebrate this achievement. If three parties of 16 are brought through a leg, the difficulty of that leg increases for future trips (unless it is already the maximum difficulty, named "Very, Very Hard" and color-coded red). The four difficulty levels are 'Not So Easy', 'Oh So Hard', 'Very Hard', and 'Very Very Hard', and each difficulty level is color-coded (green, yellow, orange, and red, or green, purple, yellow, and red, respectively). Once a leg has increased in difficulty, there is no way to reverse the change.

== Development ==
The game was created in 1995, and released in 1996. The European version has different names of some areas of the game.

== Expansions and franchise ==
The US version of the game was expanded and republished as Zoombinis Logical Journey v2.0 by The Learning Company in September 2001.

A remake for modern devices, titled Zoombinis, was officially released on 6 August 2015 for iPadOS, Android, Windows and MacOS, and for Fire OS on 28 October of the same year by TERC, FableVision, and Learning Games Network.

Graphical differences between remake and original ("Pizza Pass" level)

Original

Remake

== Reception ==
The Washington Post's Rob Pegoraro wrote that the game's pattern and deductive logic puzzles teach "how to think" rather than a specific skill. Karney said the game was fun and praised its audio cues for children with little reading skills. In 1997, the game won "Best Home Education for Pre-Teens" at the 12th Codie awards. The editors of PC Gamer US named Zoombinis 1996's "Best Educational Game", and wrote that it "has the same appeal and value for your brain as a favorite sport does for your body". It was also a finalist for the Computer Game Developers Conference's 1996 "Best Educational Game" Spotlight Award, but lost the prize to Freddi Fish 2. It received 4 out of 5 stars from Macworld, and 4 out of 5 from MacUser, whose editors declared it one of 1996's top 50 CD-ROMs.
