= Family Pastimes =

Canadian board game publisher

Family Pastimes is a boardgame publisher based out of Perth, Ontario, Canada. Hailed as the original "inventor" of cooperative boardgaming, from 1973 to 1990, it was the only publisher of exclusively cooperative games.

In 1973, Jim and Ruth Deacove left their careers as high school teachers in Boissevain, Manitoba to form a boardgame company focused exclusively on cooperative games with themes such as mountain climbing, harvesting a crop, building a community or exploring space while overcoming obstacles in collaboration with other players rather than against them. The company was started with their savings, and a $1000 loan from a friend - purchasing a printing press, paper cutter, table saw and sander. By 1982, it had built a catalogue with over 60 games and had become the largest publisher of cooperative games in North America. In October 1983, an electrical fire destroyed the barn in which $125,000 of board game inventory was stored. By 1986 the company had annual sales of $200,000.

Born into a Doukhobor family, Deacove has also written manuals on cooperative sports and party games.

Harvest Time is one of their most popular board games, and was one of five whose license was purchased by Playtoy Industries when Deacove declined to sell the entire company. Two other popular games are Zen Blocks and Community which is a Monopoly-style game. Eagle Eye Agency sees players work together to solve various crimes. By 1982 they had 38 games, including Sleeping Grump, Beautiful Place, Warp N Woof, Space Future, Pin N Ball, Max the Cat, Caves and Claws, Mountaineering, and Amazing Illusions.

Lynn Johnston, the creator of For Better or For Worse comics wrote enthusiastically about the games, which in the 1970s were advertised in The New Yorker, Saturday Night and Psychology Today when the company was operated as a mail order business. Dr. Terry Orlick, who wrote about the role of cooperation in sports and game psychology, also applauded the Family Pastimes innovative games which were also featured in the Canadian Toy Testing Council's 1983 recommendations for parents.

"Cooperative games" are rated on BoardGameGeek.
