= Playtoy Industries =

Canadian toy company

Playtoy Industries was a Canada-based toy company founded by 1973 in Toronto, Ontario, with president Jerry Smith and vice-presidents Stephen Morris and Ron Burke. In 1997, it moved to Concord, Ontario. They went out of business in mid 1999.

Playtoy both developed its own games, and licensed from others. Most often, they licensed from Pressman Toy Corporation. Playtoy Industries would then translate the product into French in order to ship a bilingual product. Playtoy introduced three new Canadian games each year. They licensed some of these to Pressman Toy Corporation, as in the case of IQ2000. The company also distributed a range of games in Canada for the Sega Genesis.

Games were manufactured both locally at their combined offices/factory and overseas. The most notable exceptions were hoolahoops and some other plastic products which were assembled by ARC Industries (a sheltered workshop for adults with a developmental disability).

Playtoy also manufactured games based on television game shows, such as La Guerre des clans from TQS, and other shows from CBC Television and other Canadian broadcasters. They were Johnson & Johnson's infant toys distributor in Canada (and responsible for the French translation).

Playtoy's mass manufactured Co-Operative Game line was licensed from Family Pastimes. which continued to manufacture the same games in small batches. Thus the same games, with the same titles, were sold in two forms at the same time.

== Distributed games ==
Red Box Line (value line)

- Snakes & Ladders (1998)
- Pickup Sticks
- Checkers
- Tic Tac Toe
- Replacement Chess Pieces
- Michigan Rummy

Developed by/for Playtoy

- IQ 2000 / Jeu de savoir (1984) Game of Knowledge (UK), Spiel des Wissens (Germany), Kwestie van weten (Netherlands), Seneca, el juego del saber (Spanish)
- IQ 2000 Rock Edition
- Inve$tor (1985)
- Domino Rally
- Tongue Twister (1988)
- Monster Dominoes
- Forever Green (1991)

Licensed from Pressman Toy Corporation

- Picture Tri-Ominos (1973)
- Safely Home Game (1985)
- La roue chanceuse / Wheel of Fortune (1988)
- "Siege" ( Game of Battle Action similar to Crossbows and Catapults ) 1994
- Rummikub (rummy tile game - Manufactured in Taiwan © Israel) 1995
- 'Smath

Licensed from Palmer-Cornale Games

- Charades

Licensed from BroderBund

- Where in the World is Carmen San Diego (board game)
- Personal Preference

Co-Operative Games Line, licensed from Family Pastimes, Inc

- Granny's House
- Harvest Time
- Funny Faces
- Mountaineering
- Deep Sea Diving
- Sleeping Grump

Unknown

- La Guerre des clans /Family Feud (1993)
- Teenage Mutant Ninja Turtles Sewer Hockey (this is the only known Playtoy product which was sold in Quebec, without being translated into French)
- Dizzy Dizzy Dinosaur
- Real Squirmin' Bugs (1997)
- Crazy Bones
- Grand Champion Toy Horses

Distributed on behalf of Johnson and Johnson

- Balls in a Bowl
