= Shufflepuck Café =

1989 video game

- Cover art by Gary Ruddell
- Developers: Christopher Gross; Gene Portwood; Lauren Elliott
- Publishers: Broderbund; Ubisoft
- Platforms: Amiga, Apple IIGS, Atari ST, Amstrad CPC, MS-DOS, Famicom, Macintosh, PC-98, X68000
- Release: 6 July 1989
- Genre: Sports
- Mode: Single-player

Shufflepuck Café is an air hockey video game developed by Christopher Gross, Gene Portwood and Lauren Elliott for Broderbund (not a table shuffleboard video game, as the name would suggest—though that was the intention when the name was coined by Christopher Gross). Originally developed for the Macintosh, it was later adapted for the Amiga, Atari ST, Amstrad CPC, Famicom, X68000, PC-98, and MS-DOS.

== Gameplay ==
Screenshot from the Amiga version, playing against Princess Bejin

There are two game modes. The player can compete in a tournament, playing against opponents who visit the Café, or can practice against each opponent to find out their weakness in a single-player match.

The game is controlled via the computer's mouse. The player and a computer opponent are positioned at opposite ends of a playing table and control paddles to knock a puck back and forth. One point is scored every time either side drives the puck past the paddle controlled by the other, represented by the shattering of a glass shield at that end of the table. The first side to score a set number of points (usually 15) wins the match.

Shufflepuck Café includes nine opponents:

- Skip Feeney: A short male human in his early 20s, wearing glasses. Has just started in shufflepuck and thus is very nervous and slow to react, making him easy to beat.
- Visine Orb: A green-coloured alien with huge eyes, who is only about 1.5 metres tall and can barely see over his end of the table. He jitters his paddle all over his end of the table, so that his serves often bounce back and forth on their way to the player.
- Vinnie the Dweeb: A veteran shufflepuck player who keeps his calm and is not easily surprised. While not particularly strong, his playing style is consistent and is a slight step up in difficulty from the two previous opponents.
- Lexan Smythe-Worthington: A lizard-like alien, a filthy rich playboy who gets 30,000 credits per year to keep away from his home world. He begins playing fiercely and hard to beat, but as play progresses, he sips his champagne, making him inebriated and less focused on the game, thus easier to beat. When defeated, he hiccups and passes out.
- The General (also known as Eneg Doowtrop - "Gene Portwood" spelled backwards): A pig-like alien who pretends to be a military general, although he really is just a militaristic gung-ho enthusiast. Recently divorced, he is addicted to shufflepuck, which he plays with fierceness and devotion.
- Nerual Ttoille ("Lauren Elliott" spelled backwards): A non-corporeal alien. Mimics the player's own shot power and angle. He occasionally opens his robe to expose a one-eyed alien at chest level, who either smirks or snarls at the player depending on whether he has just won or lost a point.
- Princess Bejin: A woman with supernatural powers. When it is her turn to serve the puck, she uses telekinesis to float it out to the center of the table and drift it to one side before sending it toward the player. One of two different sound effects accompanies each serve, indicating whether the puck will move in the same or opposite direction.
- Biff Raunch: The reigning champion. A tough, street-hardened biker dude who plays a mean game. He has no weaknesses and only the best players will be able to beat him.
- DC3: A robot waiter. DC3 serves as a training partner, who can be customised to be as easy or as difficult as the player wishes. He does not play in the main championship.

In some versions, during gameplay there is a cheat option, which gives the player the option of winning or losing the game, winning or losing the tournament or gaining or losing five points.

Subsequent releases include Shufflepuck Revolution (an OS X version, now discontinued) and Shufflepuck (from the same developer).

== Plot ==
There is a general storyline behind the Amiga and Famicom versions of the game in which the player is an inter-galactic salesman whose spaceship has broken down. He needs to find a telephone to call the breakdown service and get the spaceship fixed. Shufflepuck Café is the nearest place for miles, so he goes in to use their telephone. The main eight Shufflepuck players are standing in his way and will not let him get to the phone until he has beaten them all. Once all are defeated, the player gets in his spaceship and flies off into the distance.

== Reception ==
The game was reviewed in 1989 in Dragon #142 by Hartley, Patricia, and Kirk Lesser in "The Role of Computers" column. The reviewers gave the game 4 1/2 out of 5 stars. On release, Famitsu magazine scored the Famicom version of the game a 23 out of 40. A retrospective review for Retro Gamer from 2008 said the game was a "forgotten gem" although unfortunately lacking a 2 player mode.
