= Genetic Drift (video game) =

1981 shooter video game

- Developer: Scott Schram
- Publisher: Broderbund
- Platforms: Apple II, Atari 8-bit
- Release: 1981
- Genre: Shoot 'em up

Genetic Drift is a shoot 'em up video game written by Scott Schram for the Apple II and published by Broderbund in late 1981. A port to Atari 8-bit computers was released in 1982.

== Gameplay ==
Genetic Drift is a game in which the player changes hostile mutants into friendly life forms.

== Reception ==
Bob Boyd reviewed the game for Computer Gaming World, and stated that "This is not a game for the pondering thoughtful player. I would recommend this game to arcade addicts only. The game can become extremely angering especially when you've got all but one form turned into a TV set and while waiting for it to come back into range you notice the heart peacefully drifting toward you from the rear is upside down."

== Development ==
Scott Schram quit his job to write the game for the Apple II. He spent several weeks developing Photon Base, which Broderbund retitled Genetic Drift.
