= Star Blazer (video game) =

1982 video game

- Publisher: Broderbund
- Designer: Tony Suzuki
- Platforms: Apple II, Atari 8-bit, MSX, VIC-20
- Release: 1982: Apple II; 1983: Atari, MSX, VIC-20
- Genre: Scrolling shooter

Star Blazer is a horizontally scrolling shooter programmed by Tony Suzuki for the Apple II and published by Broderbund Software in 1982. A version for Atari 8-bit computers was released in 1983 as Sky Blazer.

== Gameplay ==
Star Blazer is a game in which the player is the Star Blazer, fighting back against the oppressive Bungeling Empire.

== Reception ==
Barry Gittleman reviewed the game for Computer Gaming World, and stated that "The game is enjoyable for almost all gaming types. The only disappointment is the sudden ending after that terrific build-up. Star-Blazer must be seen to be truly appreciated."
