= Choplifter II =

1991 video game

- North American cover art
- Developer(s): Beam Software
- Publisher(s): Victor Musical Industries; JVC Musical Industries
- Composer(s): Marshall Parker
- Series: Choplifter
- Platform(s): Game Boy
- Release: 1991
- Genre(s): Scrolling shooter
- Mode(s): Single-player, multiplayer

Choplifter II (チョップリフターII) is a video game developed by Beam Software and released in 1991 exclusively for the Game Boy. It is a follow-up to the original Choplifter and the first entry in the series released for the Game Boy.

== Gameplay ==
As in the original, the objective of the game is to rescue hostages.

Gameplay is largely the same as the original Choplifter and revolves around piloting a rescue helicopter into hostile territory and rescuing hostages. Enemies like birds, fighter jets, and ammunition fired from various weapons can harm the player's helicopter. Saving more hostages than the scenario requires will allow players to collect extra points, but losing a lot of hostages will lead to a loss of continues, regardless of how many lives the player has during that time.

== Reception ==
Mean Machines gave the game a 90%, calling it a "perfect mini blastathon which packs thrills and spills in a totally addictive package that's impossible to resist" and "a simple, yet highly compelling game..." that "should keep you glued to your Gameboy for weeks". Gary Whitta, writing for Advanced Computer Entertainment, gave the game a positive review, commenting on the portable sequel's faithfulness to its predecessor.

French magazine Joypad gave the game an 82%, calling it "pleasant" and "fun", despite being critical to its controls.
