= Fantavision =

2D animation program

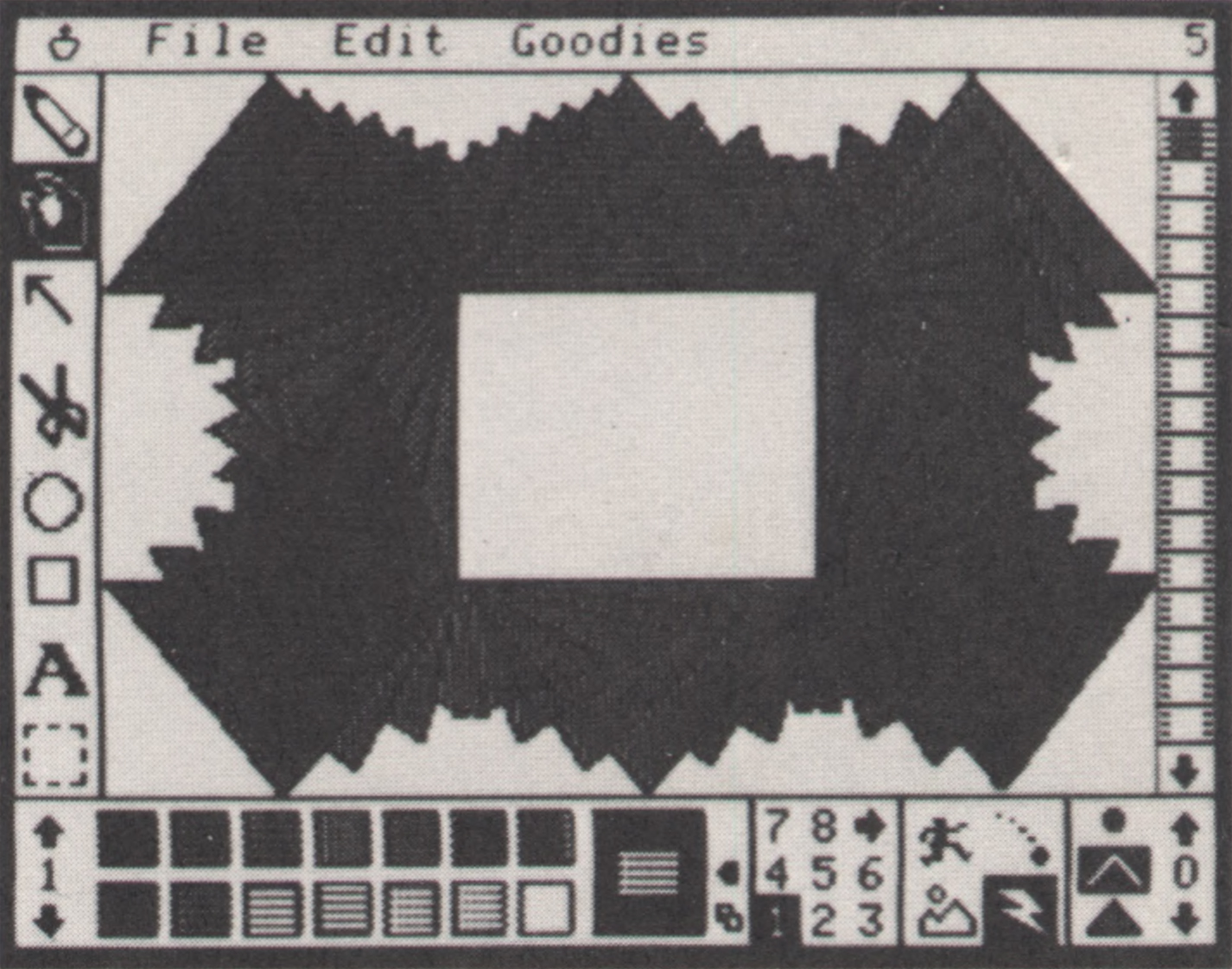
- Screenshot from the 1985 Broderbund Newsletter
- Original author: Scott Anderson
- Release: 1985; 41 years ago
- Stable release: MS-DOS (1988)
- Platform: Apple II, Apple IIGS, Amiga, MS-DOS

Fantavision is an animation program by Scott Anderson for the Apple II, published by Broderbund in 1985. Versions were released for the Apple IIGS (1987), Amiga (1988), and MS-DOS (1988).

Fantavision allows the creation of vector graphics animations using the mouse and keyboard. The user creates frames, and the software generates the frames between them. Because this is done in real-time, it allows for creative exploration and quick changes. The program uses a graphical user interface in the style of the Macintosh with pull-down menus and black text on a white background.

Advertisements claimed Fantavision a revolutionary breakthrough that brings the animation features of "tweening" and "transforming" to home computers.

== Reception ==
Compute! in 1989 called Fantavision the best animation program for the IBM PC, although it noted the inability to draw curves.

== Reviews ==
- Games #70
