= Gogo's Crazy Bones =

Toy line

Also known as Gogo's
- Designers: Magic Box Int - part of Martomagic (PPI Worldwide)
- Publishers: iToys (North America); Plus Marketing (Europe); Panini (Brazil)
- Players: Any Number can play
- Setup time: 1 minute
- Playing time: Dependent on game
- Chance: High
- Skills: Flicking, concentration

Gogo's Crazy Bones (Stylized as gogo's CRAZY BONES, also referred to as Crazy Bones or Gogo's) are colorful plastic figurines that can be used to play many different games, similar to marbles and jacks. There were many series throughout their production. Each piece is a different character with a name and personality. They became a popular fad during the late 1990s. Crazy Bones were produced by PPI Worldwide and distributed by Spanish company Magic Box, Int. from 1996 to 2019.

== History ==
Crazy Bones was inspired by a children's game played in Ancient Greece and Rome called 'Astragal' (Knucklebones), where children played a similar game using sheep's knucklebones. This ancient pastime is also known as Tabas. Games played are reminiscent of marbles and jacks. Crazy Bones is a modern version of this game, played with characters molded from plastic. There are hundreds of individual characters, each character having a unique face and name. Each series has a number of 'rare' pieces that are sought after by collectors and are sold on numerous websites for many times their original value.

Crazy Bones was launched in the United States by Peter Gantner after witnessing the success of Barcelona-based GoGos in Spain, which had sold over 350 million packs from its inception in 1996 to 1997. Gantner formed Toy Craze in December 1997 with his brother David Gantner and businessman Scott Harris, and the company acquired the distribution rights in the US. Some sources indicate Bill Flaherty, who became President of Toy Craze, also founded the company. Gogos agreed to provide him with inventory with no upfront costs in return for 50% of all profits. This deal was later renegotiated, and the manufacturer was later paid a royalty of sales.

A small company at the time of inception, Crazy Bones became a popular fad in the late 90s. The product was aggressively marketed to children, and promotional events took place in scout meetings, club groups, fairs, and shows, where free sample packs were distributed. Toy demos have also taken place in SkyDome, where children were given free packs and taught how to play Crazy Bones. This promotion was organized by the Canadian marketers of Crazy Bones, a joint venture by Wayne Fromm and Eric Segal of All 4 Fun Consumer Products Ltd. All 4 Fun Toy Products Ltd. also created a series of Crazy Bones for the Toronto Blue Jays, a cereal promotion with Cap'n Crunch and another with Wrigley. In 1999 and 2000, Fromm and Segal created one of Canada's largest collectible fads in the toy industry.. Fromm conceived of a musical band based on Crazy Bones in 2000, called B2Krazy. This was a joint venture between Fromm, Segal and Iron Music. Nearly four million free packs have been distributed. Crazy Bones secured a number of high-profile partners, including McDonald's, which included the product as Happy Meal toys nationwide. These Crazy Bones were significantly larger than the normal toys, possibly to reduce risk of choking among young children.

Within two years, the company's revenues had grown to nearly $17 million. By favoring tours of scout meetings and the like over television and print advertisements, Toy Craze has also kept its marketing costs to around 10%.

=== Gogo's Crazy Bones in America ===
==== United States ====
Peter Gantner, a purveyor of POGS, is responsible for bringing Crazy Bones to the United States after learning about their success in Barcelona, Spain. In 1997, Gantner cut a $50,000 deal with Spanish company Magic Box International, Inc for the product and distribution rights for Crazy Bones in the United States. Crazy Bones were first sold in the United States in February 1998 by Gantner's Cleveland based toy company Toy Craze, Inc.

The original series, called "Gogo's", were small plastic figurines made with faces. Each gogo had a different name and personality. Crazy Bones were most often sold in foil packs for about 2 dollars and came with four pieces, four stickers, and a game card. In an attempt to make Crazy Bones more valuable collectibles, Gantner "buried" the original 60 characters by stopping their production May 1999.

Toy Craze racked up 3.5 million dollars of sales in 1998 from Crazy Bones. Toy stores that carried Crazy Bones include: Zany Brainy, Learningsmith, and FAO Schwarz. Zany Brainy even partnered with Toy Craze and came out with their own original gogo's "Zany-Ack" and "Brainy-Ack".

In March 1999, Toy Craze came out with a brand new series released in United States called "Sports"; the series included 40 Crazy Bones characters with a soccer theme. The pieces were numbered 1-40, separate from the original gogo's series.

The "Things" series launched May 1999 and included 60 Crazy Bones shaped like various everyday objects such as: a TV, a couch, and a book. "Things" were numbered 61-120 and also known as series 2, a continuation of the original 60 gogo's.

In the "Aliens" series, there are 60 different anthropomorphic figures of a classic grey, big eyed, alien. Some of the designs included: Salad Head (Caesar), Cyclops, Boris, Tut and others. A "Third" series of Crazy Bones (in the old packaging and design) named "The New Generation" was later released, including 120 all new characters. Some seem to be variations of the originals, or mutant original, but they are all meant as new characters to the series.

As of October 2010, the current distributor for Gogo's Crazy Bones in the US (as well as Canada) is Jonic Distribution North America.

==== Canada ====
Crazy Bones were originally distributed in Canada through the Concord, Ontario-based company Playtoy Industries, where they enjoyed similar success. Playtoy Industries declared bankruptcy in December 1999 and Wayne Fromm and Eric Segal catapulted Crazy Bones through a joint venture (www.frommtoys.com)

Crazy Bones enjoyed incredible popularity in the late 1990s. From 1998 to 2000, 31.5 million packages were sold. Over 23 million figurines were sold in the UK and Spain in a relaunch between March and December 2008.

The Classic series was available in Canada in the 1990s. The rebranded Gogo's Crazy Bones series 1 was sold in Canada in 2009. Series 2 became available in May 2011, then came series 3 and now series 4.

=== Gogo's Crazy Bones in Europe ===
In Europe Crazy Bones are released in different sets for different countries.

==== United Kingdom ====
===== Sets =====
The following sets have been released:

- Gogo's Crazy Bones (series 1) - 80 bones, each available in five colours, plus five 'Most Wanted' and 15 'Wanted' rare bones with different paint schemes
- Gogo's Crazy Bones Evolution (series 2) - 80 bones, each available in five colours, approximately half are translucent with embedded glitter
- Gogo's Crazy Bones Explorer (series 3) - 80 bones, each available in four normal colours and a fifth 'laser' metallic colour
- Gogo's Crazy Bones Advance - 10 bones, each available in five colours. Only available in tin boxes
- Gogo's Crazy Bones Power (series 4) - 80 bones, each available in two normal and two metallic colours, and 10 'Most Wanted' rare metallic bones with added paint steps. This set also adds a collectible card game to the mix with each pack containing two bones and two cards (often one normal figure, one metallic figure, one normal game card and one metallic card) with a chance of a 'Most Wanted' figure or card replacing one of these. The Most Wanted cards have the character name suffixed with a '-W', and have a laser-style finish.
- Gogo's Crazy Bones Gold Series Limited Edition Tin Part 1 - 10 bones. Only available in tin boxes. Gold metallic versions of popular characters from series 1–3.
- Gogo's Crazy Bones England 2010 - 27 bones and five 'laser' variants. These bones each represent a member of the England 2010 football squad. Each has a more complex paint scheme than usual, and the rear of the bone has the name of the player it represents.
- Gogo's Crazy Bones Superstar (series 5) - 80 bones, each available in two colours, plus four Most Wanted versions. Features a selection of the most popular bones from Series 1–4. Each bone has a new "fuzzy" finish. Most Wanted versions have a combined Fuzzy Metallic finish. Packs have a retail price of £1.99 and contain two bones, two stickers and one storage/display cube. The cubes come in seven colours and can be attached to each other in the style of popular building bricks.
- Gogo's Crazy Bones Gold Series Limited Edition Tin Part 2 - 10 bones. Only available in tin boxes. Gold metallic versions of popular characters from series 1–4.
- Gogo's Crazy Bones Trading card series - 160 cards, 128 'Normal' and 32 'Leaders'. Trading card versions of popular characters from Series 1–4.
- Gogo's Crazy Bones Edge (series 6) - 60 bones. These launched in the UK at the end of January 2012.

===== Specials =====
In March 2009, to mark the release of the Explorer series in the UK, the Daily Mirror newspaper ran a week-long promotion where they gave away free figurines, stickers and sticker books. Two of the figurines were exclusive to this giveaway

In April 2009, the Entertainer toy shop in Kingston upon Thames held a 'swap day'. Every swapper received a special 'Laser Mosh' - Mosh is the first bone in the original series. The Laser Mosh is lime green, and carries the same coating as the Explorer special Gogos.

===== Gogo's Mega Metropolis =====
In January 2010, Gogo's Crazy Bones Mega Metropolis was re-released in the UK after an earlier trial in selected areas. A Partwork, the magazine features a new 'Mega Gogo' each week. Starting with Mosh (Gogo #1 from series 1), the Mega versions are thus far all from series 1. After that, the others have been released in a different order (1,8,3,9 etc.) Each Mega Gogo has a flip-top head which opens to reveal an evolution series 2 bone. The Mega Bones' heads are also removable, allowing different versions to be created once other models have been collected. Each Mega Bone comes in several colour variants, some of which do not match the original colours from the series. The Mega Bones are contained in a hexagonal 'pod'. These are connectible and also have different colours to collect. It is possible to pull these apart to make multi-colour pods.

===== Gogo's Trading Card Game =====
From January 21, 2011, Magic Box International added a new Gogo's Crazy Bones Trading Card Game. This new trading game complemented the range of Gogo collectable figurines and created an exciting new way to play and collect Gogos. There were 160 cards to collect, including 32 special prismatic 'Leader' cards. Packets of the Gogo's Crazy Bones Trading Card Game contain six cards (including one special card), and were priced at 50p. A Starter Pack was also available containing a Collector Album for storing the cards, a full game guide, checklist and three packets of cards. The Starter Pack was priced at £3.99. As with all Gogo's Crazy Bones collections, an extensive marketing campaign was in place to support the launch. This included a large TV advertising campaign and product sampling via the Gogo's Crazy Bones Comic.

=== Gogo's Crazy Bones in South Africa ===
Gogo's Crazy Bones Series 1 was released in South Africa in October 2009. The collectables are available as 4 product variations:

- A booster pack with three figurines and three stickers
- A collectables special bag sold with three figurines
- A sticker album
- A collector's item tin containing 10 unique figurines that are not available in any of the other product lines

In December 2009, the largest South African Sunday newspaper listed the toy as the top gift for boys between the ages of 6 and 8. Four months after release the sales exceeded 200,000 units.

Gogo's Crazy Bones Series 2 was released on March 18, 2010. The South African distributors and licensors of the toy are Blowfish Entertainment.

== Gogo's Crazy Bones in other countries ==
Different sets were released all over the world, making it very hard for collectors to get every figure.

While Series 1 was already released in North America, 15 new figures were promoted as upcoming characters to be released and inserted into Series 1 packs starting in September 2009. These 15 "Wanted Gogo's" were only available in the US and Canada. North America has also gotten many exclusive characters since JDNA's take over of distribution. Characters such as Miro K, Mr. Peako, Q-Mack, and the 20 Diamond Series characters have only been released in North America.

South American Countries received a whole different line of characters. Characters did not always have paint. The Turma Da Monica series has only been released in Brazil. The Avengers: Endgame series was released in 2019, once again exclusive to Brazil.

The Mega Metropolis line of figures was exclusively released in the UK during 2010. While 20 of the figures were rereleased in other countries later on, 60 of the 80 figures remain exclusive. The UK also received the England 2010 set, 22 special figures based on the country's football team, as well as two exclusive figures that could only be obtained via the Daily Mirror newspaper, and special mini and laser variants of Mosh that could only be obtained during special events.

Israel also received an odd line of sets - Series 1, Series 2, Foot, Cool, Olympics. Israel's line of Gogo's began with the Gogo's series, but when the Evolution series was brought over, exclusive rare metallic versions of a handful of figures were added to the collection. While Explorer was speculated to be the next release, PPI released the Foot series instead. This was the only release of the set where all figures were painted. Israel received very rare figurines based on famous football players from the country, known as the "Supergol" set. It was also the first country that the Cool Gogo's (music) series was released in, and was the only country that the very rare 2012 Olympics set was sold in.

Spain received a special series of Danonino Gogo's that were only found in newsstands, as well as Mega Nuclos figures that were usable as storage cases.

The Netherlands received the European Magic Box sets to purchase in stores, but have gotten many exclusive characters thanks to C-1000 supermarkets. The first set was a special version of the Megatrip series, with many characters receiving changes that vary from small to large. The second being Foot (with exclusive variants of existing characters and Jarum, an all new figure exclusive to the C-1000 version of the set), the 3rd being Cool (renamed to Groovy), and 4th being the X-Gogo's series, which was only released in C-1000 stores.

Panasonic teamed up with PPI to release two exclusive figures included with batteries in Germany in 2012. These two figures reused the sculpts from the Daily Mirror Gogo's.

The Philippines received gold versions of the original five most wanted Gogo's, laser versions of Megatrip figures, and special tins with special metallic versions of Urban Toys, Cool, and Megatrip characters.

India received a very limited and very rare tin with 10 Urban Toys figures with extra details added onto them.

Two sets of Disney Gogo's were released in 2016, exclusive to South America.

== Gameplay ==
Other than the collectable nature of Crazy Bones there are multiple games that can be played with the figurines including:

- Base to Base! - Three upturned plastic plant pots or cardboard boxes (etc.) are set up with at least 30 centimetres between each of them. Players take it in turns to try to flick each Gogo from one pot or box to the next, landing on the top. The smaller the pot or box is, the more difficult the target landing spot will be. Players receive two points for each Gogo that makes it to the second base, and an additional three points for each Gogo that makes it to the third base.
- Bungee Elastic! - One end of a metre length of elastic is attached to the first Gogo. Holding onto the other end of the elastic, drop the Gogo to see how high it bounces back up. The Gogo that springs up the highest is the winner and the player receives five points. The runner-up receives three points and the third one point. The remaining players (if applicable) do not receive any points.
- Chuck 'n Catch! - Taking it in turns, players put three Gogos on the back of their hand, chuck them up into the air and try to catch them as they come back down. Players receive three points for each Gogo that they catch.
- Diving Contest - Gogos are lined up along the edge of a wall and players take it in turns to flick each one off. The player is awarded one point for each somersault that the Gogo performs before it lands. If a Gogo lands standing upright, five extra points are awarded to the player. Optionally, a bucket of water can be placed at the bottom of the wall and the Gogo that makes the smallest splash is awarded an extra five points. The winner is the player with the most points once all the Gogos have been flicked off.
- Fingers and Fours - Taking it in turns, players turn their hands palm up and balance a Gogo on each finger. They then throw them up into the air (at least 30 centimetres high) and try to catch as many as they can. Players receive two points for each Gogo that they catch.
- Football Madness! - Using chalk, mark out a football pitch on the ground with one set of goalposts at either end. Scrunch up some paper into a ball and place it in the centre of the pitch. Each player chooses five Gogos and places one in their goal before flipping a coin to see who starts. Players then have ten minutes to try and score as many goals against the other as possible. At the end of the game, the team with the most goals is awarded one point for each Gogo.
- Going the Distance - Players line up their Gogos along a starting line. They then take it in turns to flick them along the ground. The player that flicks their Gogo the furthest (with just one flick) is the winner and receives two points.
- Knock 'Em Out - One Gogo is placed on the floor as the target for the game. A chalk circle may be drawn around it to indicate its position if it gets knocked over or moved by other Gogos. Players stand about two meters away from the target and take it in turns to throw each of their Gogos as close to the target as possible. Players are allowed to knock other players' Gogos out of the way in order to be closer than them. Once all the Gogos have been thrown, the winner is the player that threw the Gogo that is left closest to the target. In a tournament, the winner is awarded three points, the runner-up is awarded one point, and the furthest away from the target is deducted one point.
- Pushover! - Gogos are put in pairs next to each other. Players take it in turns to choose a pair and flick one of the Gogos into the other. The three Gogos that manage to flick the others the furthest earn ten points for the player that flicked them (for a maximum total of 30 points to one player).
- Teleport, teleport, ATTACK! - Players select 1 gogo each. Each player takes it in turn to take a go. They may either "Teleport" by moving the gogo to any point on the playing surface, or "Attack", by flicking the gogo at that of the opponent. If the opponent's gogo is hit and knocked over, the one who attacked wins the game. If the attack misses, the gogo remains in the spot where it lands, and the opponent takes their turn. Players may not Attack on their first turn.
- The Drop - Players take it in turns to drop each Gogo to the floor and mark on the wall with chalk how high the Gogo bounced on its first bounce. The winner receives one point.

== Other merchandise ==
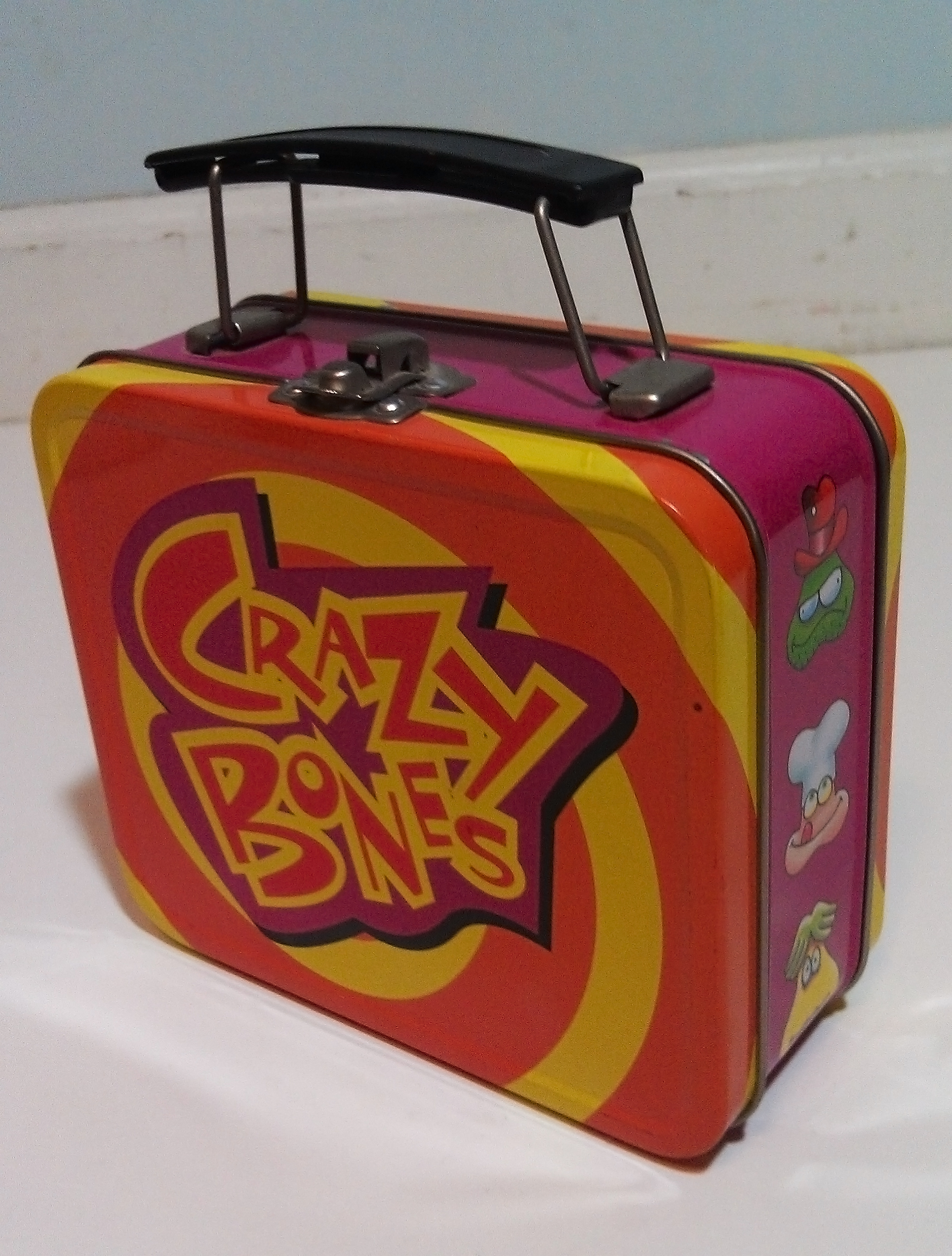
Photograph of an official Crazy Bones lunchbox.

European Crazy Bones, Evolution, Explorer and Superstar packets also contain stickers. These can be collected in sticker albums which are sold separately.

Series 4 Power Gogo's replace stickers with cards. There is a collector's folder with transparent sleeves for all cards. Released February 2011, The trading cards also have a collector's folder, sold with a free pack of cards @ £3.99.

Magic Box Int has also created various collector tins, bags (blue and green) and containers for the gogos.

In August 2009, plush toys of three types were released:

- 'Clipper' Keyrings (8 different designs)
- 6" Reversible dolls (5 designs that swap between 'normal' and 'most wanted')
- 8" 'Bone Shakers' (3 designs with removable heads that reveal a cup to throw normal-sized bones with)

All plush designs are based on bones from series 1

In March 2010, the 'England dugout 2010' was released to store the England 2010 collection.

== Planned TV Series ==
There were originally plans for a CGI action-comedy TV series based on the collectible figurines of the same name. It was animated in Peru by Aronnax Animation Studios in association with Televix Entertainment. For numerous years, the intro was the only widely available footage of the show. However, the pilot was found in late 2021.

== Series (chronologically) ==
- Gogo's (Feb. 1998)
- Sports (Mar. 1999)
- Things (May 1999)
- Aliens (Nov. 1999)
- Buddies (Nov 1999)
- Mutants (Nov. 1999)
- Mega Bones (1999)
- New Generation-Ghosts & Monsters (2005)
- 2012 Olympics
- Advanced
- Bombers (Skips)
- C1000
- Cap'n Crunch
- Daily Mirror
- Danone Dino Gogo's
- Disney
- Dragonball Z
- Edge
- England 2010
- Evolution
- Explorer
- Foot
- Fusion
- Genios Universe
- Glowies
- Gogo's 1998
- Gogo's Crazy Bones 2007
- Groovy (Cool)
- Hielocos
- Hubba Bubba Gogo's
- Israel Collection
- Kellogg's
- Magnetic Series (Mags)
- Marvel Heroes
- Medabots
- Mega Bones
- Mega Foot (Brazil)
- Mega Foot (Israel)
- Mega Groovy
- Mega Metropolis
- Mega Mutants
- Megatrip
- Megatrip Mega
- Monica's Gang
- Monica's Gang Mega
- Monster Bones (McDonald's)
- New Generation (Ghosts)
- Panasonic
- Pokémon (Unreleased)
- Power
- Q Mack & J Box
- Rockers
- Shin Chan
- Skinny Bombers (Mega Crazy Bones)
- Sports Series 2
- Supergoal
- Superstar
- Sweet Box (Macro)
- The Diamond Tins
- Third Series
- Tiny Gogo's (Eggy Key Chain)
- Tiny Gogo's (Mega Metropolis)
- Toronto Blue Jays
- Toy Story 2
- Urban Toys
- X-Gogo's
- Zany Brainy

== Similar products ==
During the mid-1990s, Coca-Cola released a similar brand of toys named "Hielocos" in Mexico, Colombia, Venezuela, Ecuador, Costa Rica and "Geloucos" and "Gelo-Cósmicos" in Brazil (The first two translated to 'Crazy Ice Cubes').

Since the resurgence of the European Gogo's Crazy Bones, several similar products have entered the market;

- Abatons - Panini
- Avengers Chibis - Made by Bulls-Eye Toys
- BlockHeadz
- Bumping Weirdos - Sold with Church's Chicken
- Cartoon Network Hielocos in association with Gamesa Cookies
- Crazy Critters - Made by Avon Company (Use same sculpts as Knuckle Heads)
- Curious Gogo's
- DC Universe Chibis - Made by Bulls-Eye Toys
- Digimon - Only released in Peru
- Digimon Tolas
- Disney Cars Jumpers
- Disney Wikkeez
- Dracco Heads - Made by Dracco
- Dragon Hunter - Made by Dracco
- Dunkin Shockys - From Poland
- E - Flyers - Made by E Max (Added a gimmick of magnets)
- Fidgets' Knuckleheads - Made by Moose
- Fings - Made by Topps Europe
- Forever Evil Chibis - Made by Bulls-Eye Toys
- Frikis - Made by E-Max (Have a BONES™ label on the back.)
- Grolls & Gorks - Made by Dracco
- Hobbit Chibis - Made by Bulls-Eye Toys
- Jojo's and TimFoot - Made by Laor Toys
- Jumpers
- Karma Kidz
- Les Barjo's
- Little Tokyo's / Japs - Made by Exit toys of Barcelona
- Matuolas - Made by Matutano (Characters were stolen from Crazy Bones)
- Mini Dinos - By Danone
- Moose Millennium Bugs
- Nitsus aka Jumpers - Made by Abril & Gici
- Nog'nz aka Marvel Madz
- Pupákok - Made by Master Crok
- Simpsons Dracco Heads - Made by Dracco
- SpongeBob E-Flyers - Made by E Max
- Star Wars Dracco Heads - Made by Dracco
- Toonz/Blinku micro monsters (40 to collect + 2(?)half-toonz that connect to create a single micro monster) - Clearly derivative but with the gimmick of animated '3d motion effect' faces. Made by Dracco, a Danish company with a Macau-based subsidiary.
- Skyzos - Made by Panini. Each model has a good and evil side.
- Urbanzees
