= Choplifter =

1982 video game

- Atari 5200 box art
- Developer: Dan Gorlin (Note: Arcade version developed by Sega R&D1; SG-1000 and MSX versions developed by Compile; Famicom version developed by Tose; Master System version developed by Sega R&D2.)
- Publishers: Broderbund: C64; NA: Broderbund; EU: Ariolasoft 5200 Atari, Inc. Arcade, SG-1000, Master System Sega Famicom Jaleco 7800 Atari Corporation
- Series: Choplifter
- Platform: Apple II: Atari 8-bit, VIC-20, Commodore 64, Atari 5200, FM-7, PC-88, ColecoVision, Coleco Adam, SG-1000, arcade, MSX, PC-6001, Sharp X1, Thomson MO5, Thomson TO7/70, Famicom, Master System, Atari 7800
- Release: May 21, 1982: Apple II; NA: May 21, 1982 Atari 8-bit; 1982 C64; NA: September 1983 5200; Mid-1984 ColecoVision; Early 1985 SG-1000; JP: July 1985 Arcade; JP: September 25, 1985; EU: Late 1985; NA: December 1985 Famicom; JP: June 26, 1986 Master System; NA: September 1986; UK: August 1987 7800; August 1987
- Genre: Scrolling shooter
- Mode: Single-player
- Arcade system: Sega System 2

Choplifter (stylized as Choplifter!) is a 1982 horizontally scrolling shooter video game developed by Dan Gorlin and published by Broderbund for the Apple II. It was ported to the Atari 8-bit computers the same year, and later to the VIC-20, Commodore 64, Atari 5200, ColecoVision, MSX, and Thomson computers. In 1985, Sega released a remake for arcades, with subsequent ports published for the Master System and Famicom in 1986. Graphically enhanced versions for the Atari 8-bit computers and the Atari 7800 were also released in 1988 by Atari Corporation.

== Gameplay ==
The player assumes the role of a combat helicopter pilot who must rescue hostages held in barracks within the territory controlled by the evil Bungeling Empire. The player must collect the hostages (described in the backstory as "delegates to the United Nations Conference on Peace and Child Rearing") and safely transport them to the nearby U.S. Postal Service building, all while fending off hostile tanks and other enemy combatants. According to the backstory, the helicopter's parts were smuggled into the country, disguised as a "mail-sorting machine".

The helicopter can face three directions: left, right, or forward (facing the player). It can shoot at enemies in any of these directions and need not fly in the same direction it is facing. The forward-facing mode is primarily used to shoot at tanks. The player must be cautious to protect the hostages from enemy fire and avoid hitting them with friendly fire.

To rescue the prisoners, the player must first shoot at one of the hostage buildings to release the hostages, then land to allow them to board the sortie, and finally return them to the player's starting point. Each of the four buildings holds 16 hostages, and the helicopter can only carry up to 16 passengers at a time, meaning several trips are necessary. Once the chopper is full, no more hostages will attempt to board; they will wave the helicopter off and wait for its return. Each successive trip is typically more perilous than the last, as the enemy becomes aware of the player's actions and mounts a counterattack.

If the player lands directly on top of a hostage or completely blocks the building exit, the hostages will be killed. In the Apple II and Atari 7800 versions, hostages will also die if the helicopter is not landed correctly (i.e., if it is slightly tilted), being crushed as they attempt to board. While grounded, the helicopter can be attacked by enemy tanks, which it can only shoot at by returning to the air. Additionally, enemy jet fighters are deployed, which can attack the helicopter in the air with air-to-air missiles or on the ground with bombs. The next enemy is an alien spacecraft, which is very hard to avoid.

== Development ==
Coming off a stint working for the Rand Corporation, Dan Gorlin initially developed Choplifter using an Apple II loaned to him by his grandfather. Initially, Gorlin envisioned Choplifter as a 3D game, but he switched to a traditional 2D game environment due to technical limitations.

The game was developed in six months. After Gorlin began experimenting with animating a helicopter on the Apple II, he added scenery, tanks, and planes, with the hostages being added last. He noted that, as a story developed, the film camera techniques seemed appropriate, including the final message "The End" instead of "Game Over". Gorlin's first demonstration to Broderbund was "too realistic" for a helicopter simulation, and the company helped him make it easier to fly. The concept of rescuing hostages was inspired by Gorlin's experience with the game Defender, in which the player must protect people on the ground. Although the Iran hostage crisis ended the year before the game was released, Gorlin said that the game was not intended to be a "tie-in" to this event during the game's development.

In the 1990s, Gorlin revisited the 3D concept in a failed attempt to remake the game.

== Reception ==
Debuting in May 1982, the game sold 9,000 copies by June, appearing on Computer Gaming World's list of top sellers. II Computing listed Choplifter seventh on the magazine's list of top Apple II games as of late 1985, based on sales and market share data.

In Japan, Game Machine listed Sega's arcade version of Choplifter as the most successful table arcade unit of October 1985. After being dethroned by Taito's The Legend of Kage on November 15, Choplifter returned to the top of the chart on December 1.

=== Reviews ===
Softline in 1982 called the game "the first Interactive Computer-Assisted Animated Movie", describing it as a fusion of arcade gaming, simulation, and filmic visual aesthetics. The magazine praised the animation and the helicopter's "subtle flight control" and concluded that seeing the hostages' "hope and excitement, their faith in you" made the game "hard to play". In 1983, its readers named Choplifter fourth on the magazine's Top Thirty list of Atari 8-bit programs by popularity. BYTE called Choplifter "great fun". Computer Gaming World, Creative Computing Video & Arcade Games, and The Commodore 64 Home Companion praised the graphics and animation, the latter stating that the hostages running across the desert made the game "alive" and realistic.

The Apple II version of the game received a Certificate of Merit in the category of "Best Computer Audiovisual Effects" at the 4th annual Arkie Awards, and shortly afterward, Billboard named it Computer Game of the Year. The Addison-Wesley Book of Atari Software 1984 gave the game an overall A+ rating, calling it "a masterpiece". The book concluded that the concept, graphics, and animation make this "a delightful game". InfoWorld's Essential Guide to Atari Computers cited it as "innovative" and a "winner".

Console XS magazine reviewed the Sega Master System version, giving it a score of 85%. Computer and Video Games magazine reviewed the Master System version in 1989, giving it a score of 87%. They also reviewed the ColecoVision and Atari 7800 versions, giving them scores of 81% and 84%, respectively.

== Legacy ==
Choplifter II, subtitled "Rescue Survive", was released for the Game Boy in 1991, then remade for both the Game Boy and Game Gear as Choplifter III in 1994. An unrelated Choplifter III was released for Super NES.

1994 Amiga game Apocalypse was seen as significantly inspired by Choplifter.

In late 1997, Gorlin and his development team, Ariok Entertainment, were working on a Choplifter game for IBM PC compatibles that would be in 3D and feature multiplayer functionality. The game was never released.

Sega released a pair of spiritual successors without the Choplifter brand: Air Rescue (1991) for the Sega System 32 arcade hardware is a first-person, pseudo-3D take on the concept. Air Rescue (1992) for the Master System more closely resembles the 2D Choplifter, but features stages that scroll in all directions.

Programmer Will Botti cited Choplifter as a major inspiration for his 1996 game Black Dawn.

In 2004, Xicat Interactive published ChopLifter: Crisis Shield exclusively in Europe.

inXile Entertainment released Choplifter HD for Xbox Live Arcade, PlayStation Network, and Microsoft Windows in January 2012, and for Ouya in August 2013.
