= Doug Carlston =

American chief executive (born 1947)

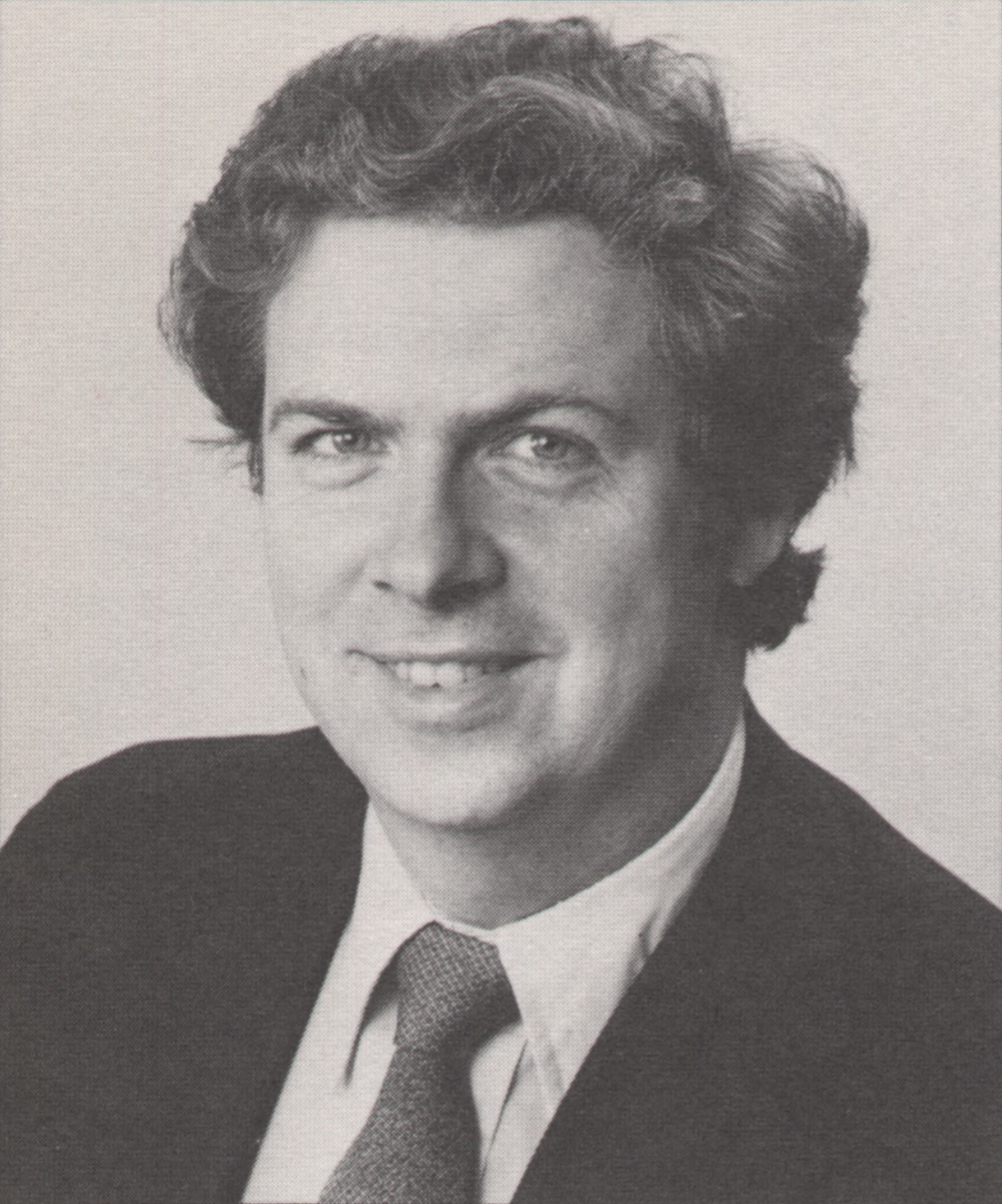
Carlston in 1986

Douglas Gene Carlston (born April 30, 1947 in Boston, Massachusetts) is the founder and CEO of Tawala Systems based in San Rafael, California. He was previously CEO, chairman, and co-founder of Broderbund Software, a software publishing firm that produced Lode Runner, The Print Shop, Where in the World Is Carmen Sandiego?, Prince of Persia, and Myst. Broderbund was acquired in 1998 by The Learning Company (the company previously known as SoftKey) for $420 million, and the combined company was sold to Mattel for $3.6 billion.

== Biography ==
Carlston was born in Boston in 1947 and grew up in Dubuque and Iowa City, Iowa. He received his bachelor's degree from Harvard University in 1970 and also studied economics at the Johns Hopkins School of Advanced International Studies. He earned a J.D. from Harvard Law School in 1975. Prior to founding Broderbund in 1980, he was an attorney. As of February 1994 Carlston owned 18% of the company.

He has served as chairman of Public Radio International (PRI) and of the Carlston Family Foundation (formerly the Broderbund Foundation), and on the boards of the MoveOn Political Action Committee, the Ploughshares Fund, the Albanian American Enterprise Fund, A.H. Belo Corporation, and the Long Now Foundation. He has also served on the Committee on University Resources of Harvard University, and the board of advisors of the Johns Hopkins School of Advanced International Studies.

In March 2014, Carlston donated company records, design documents, and games from Broderbund's history to The National Museum of Play.
