= FableVision =

American media production studio

- Industry: Educational media Educational software
- Founded: 1996
- Founders: Peter H. Reynolds; Paul Reynolds; Gary Goldberger; John Lechner
- Divisions: FableVision Studios; FableVision Learning
- Subsidiaries: The Reynolds Center for Teaching, Learning and Creativity

FableVision Studios is a media production studio. FableVision designs and develops educational media, including software, games, interactive activities, mobile apps, animated films, websites, and museum kiosks.

FableVision produces children's broadcast programming, educational videos, and multimedia applications.

== History ==
FableVision was set up in 1996 by twin brothers Peter and Paul Reynolds with Gary Goldberger and John Lechner. Prior to starting FableVision, Peter Reynolds was working for Tom Snyder Production using media, storytelling, and technology in education. Paul Reynolds was working with Cosmic Blender, using media, storytelling, and technology for adults in workplace training. FableVision was originally in Watertown, Massachusetts alongside Cosmic Blender.

== FableVision Learning ==
FableVision Learning is a K-12 educational media publisher.

== The Reynolds Center for Teaching, Learning and Creativity ==
The Reynolds Center for Teaching, Learning and Creativity is a 501(c)(3) non-profit organization.
