= Broderbund =

American software company

Broderbund Software
- Industry: Software; Video games
- Founded: 1980; 46 years ago San Rafael, California, US
- Founder: Doug Carlston; Gary Carlston
- Defunct: 1998; 28 years ago
- Fate: Acquired by and folded into The Learning Company. Red Orb Entertainment folded into Mindscape.
- Successor: The Learning Company
- Headquarters: Eugene, Oregon, US; San Rafael, California, US; Novato, California, US
- Key people: Doug Carlston (chairman, CEO); Gary Carlston; Cathy Carlston Brisbois; Edmund Auer
- Revenue: 172,000,000 ±1000000 United States dollar (1995)
- Parent: The Learning Company
- Website: broderbund.com

Broderbund Software, Inc. (formerly stylized as Brøderbund) was an American maker of video games, educational software, and productivity tools. Broderbund is best known for the 8-bit video game hits Choplifter, Lode Runner, Karateka, and Prince of Persia (all of which originated on the Apple II), as well as The Print Shop—originally for printing signs and banners on dot matrix printers—and the Myst and Carmen Sandiego games. The company was founded in Eugene, Oregon, and moved to San Rafael, California, then later to Novato, California. Broderbund was purchased by The Learning Company in 1998.

Brøderbund is now the brand name for Riverdeep's graphic design, productivity, and edutainment titles such as The Print Shop, Carmen Sandiego, Mavis Beacon Teaches Typing, the Living Books series and Reader Rabbit, in addition to publishing software for other companies, notably Zone Labs' ZoneAlarm.

As of 2001, Ubisoft owns the entertainment titles of Brøderbund, including Prince of Persia.

The company would often release school editions of its games, which contained extra features to allow teachers to use the software to facilitate students' learning.

== Etymology ==
The word "brøderbund" is not an actual word in any language and has never been used as a surname, but is a somewhat loose translation of "band of brothers" into a mixture of Danish, Dutch, German, and Swedish. The "ø" in "brøderbund" was used partially as a play on the letter ø from the Dano-Norwegian alphabet; however, the letter was mainly referencing the slashed zero found in mainframes, terminals, and early personal computers. The three crowns above the logo are also a reference to the lesser national coat of arms of Sweden.

The company's name is pronounced /ˈbruːdərbʌnd/ instead of the popularly used /ˈbroʊdərbʌnd/.

== History ==
Early Broderbund logo with the stylized O

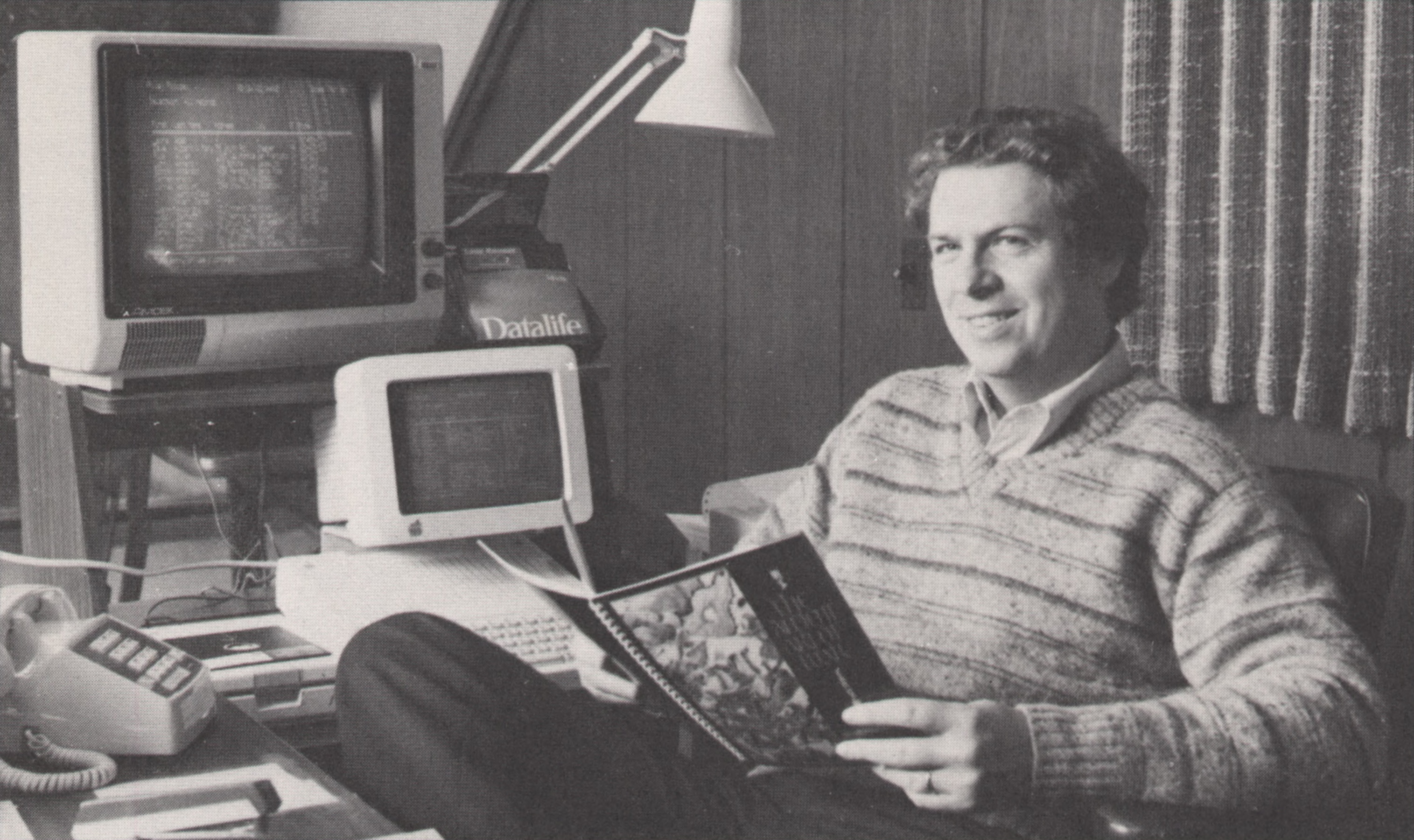
Doug Carlston, 1985

Broderbund was founded by brothers Doug and Gary Carlston in 1980 to market Galactic Empire, a strategy computer game that Doug Carlston had created in 1979. Before founding the company, Doug was a lawyer and Gary had held several jobs, including teaching Swedish at an American college. Their sister Cathy joined the company a year later from Lord & Taylor. Besides Doug and Gary Carlston, their brother Don wrote an Apple II game and invested $500 in the company. Galactic Empire had many names taken from African languages; a group of merchants was named Broederbond, Afrikaans for "association of brothers". To emphasize its family origin while avoiding a connection with the ethnonationalist Afrikaner organization of the same name, the Carlstons altered the spelling when naming their company "Brøderbund". Gary Carlston said "If we had known we were going to be successful we would not have [chosen that name], as we endured a fair bit of criticism because of the South African connection".

The company's original intention was to market software for law offices, with games as a side business. By 1982, Broderbund produced action games which, the company told Jerry Pournelle, sold much better than strategy games. Burr, Egan, Deleage & Co. invested in the company that year. In 1983, the Carlstons publicly discussed their plans to emphasize home utility software (Bank Street Writer and other "Bank Street" applications), computer literacy with The Jim Henson Company, and edutainment. By early 1984 InfoWorld estimated that Brøderbund was tied with Human Engineered Software as the world's tenth-largest microcomputer-software company and largest entertainment-software company, with $13 million in 1983 sales. That year it took over the assets of the well-regarded but financially troubled Synapse Software. Although intending to keep it running as a business, it was unable to make money from Synapse's products, and closed it down after a year.

Broderbund's The Print Shop software produced signs and greeting cards. Broderbund started discussions with Unison World about creating an MS-DOS version. The two companies could not agree on a contract, but Unison World developed a product with similar function and a similar user interface. Broderbund sued for infringement of its copyright. Brøderbund v. Unison (1986) became a landmark case in establishing that the look and feel of a software product could be subject to copyright protection.

The company turned down what Gary Carlston later described as "the worldwide rights to Tetris for $50,000". Sierra On-Line and Broderbund ended merger discussions in March 1991. By that year Brøderbund had about $50 million in revenue, and 25% share of the education market. Carmen Sandiego had been its first internally developed product, but the company now developed most of its software; Doug Carlston stated that Brøderbund needed "to control our own sources, to control our future". After an unsuccessful initial public offering in 1987, the company executed a private placement for 20% of shares with Jostens. Broderbund became a public company in November 1991 with the NASDAQ symbol BROD. When it went public The Print Shop comprised 33% of total revenue, and the Carmen Sandiego series 26%. After considering another merger with Electronic Arts in 1994, Brøderbund stock price and market capitalization climbed to $72.50 per share by September 1995, and then fell steadily because of continued losses for several years.

The early and mid-1990s saw a video game industry trend of consolidation of development and publishing companies, as rising development costs and pressure from large retailers put pressure on smaller companies. Brøderbund acquired PC Globe in July 1992. It attempted to purchase The Learning Company in 1995, but was outbid by SoftKey, who purchased The Learning Company for US$606 million in cash and then adopted its name. By 1992, Broberbund had sold 13 million copies of its software titles.

=== Acquisition ===
On June 22, 1998, The Learning Company bought Broderbund for about US$420 million in stock. The acquisition was structured as a stock swap, with The Learning Company issuing 0.80 shares for each share of Brøderbund's, with the purchasing price set at about 21 percent higher than Broderbund's valuation according to its stock price. The Learning Company then fired five hundred employees at Broderbund the same year, representing 42% of the company's workforce. Doug Carlston explained that in a bid to roll up Broderbund, SoftKey used its previous acquisitions to weaken the company's position in the industry. The company allegedly gave a rebate to customers of Mindscape's PrintMaster, a direct competitor to Broderbund's Print Shop, that was more than the product was worth.

In 1998, Broderbund agreed a deal with Nickelodeon to develop CD-ROM games based on its animated cartoons, such as Rugrats.

In 1999, the combined company was purchased by Mattel for $3.6 billion. Mattel reeled from the financial impact of this transaction, and Jill E. Barad, the CEO, ended up being forced out in a climate of investor outrage. Mattel sold its game division Mattel Interactive as well as all its assets in September 2000 to Gores Technology Group, a private acquisitions firm, for a share of whatever Gores could obtain by selling the company. During this time, Broderbund products were owned by The Learning Company Deutschland GmbH, located in Oberhaching, Germany. Headed by Jean-Pierre Nordmann, the company was a subsidiary of The Learning Company (formerly SoftKey), which itself was a wholly owned subsidiary of Gores Technology Group. The company published games under two logos: Blue (Broderbund) and Red (The Learning Company). The "Brøderbund" label was used for "high-quality infotainment, design and lifestyle titles such as Cosmopolitan My Style 2 and PrintMaster", while "The Learning Company" label was used for children's software.

In 2001, Gores sold The Learning Company's entertainment holdings to Ubi Soft, and most of the other holdings, including the Brøderbund name, to Irish company Riverdeep. Many of Brøderbund's games, such as the Myst series, are published by Ubisoft. The Brøderbund line of products is published by Encore, Inc. under license from Riverdeep. Under the terms of the agreement, Encore now manages the Broderbund family of products as well as Brøderbund's direct to consumer business. In May 2010, Encore acquired the assets of Punch! Software.

In 2014, Doug Carlston donated a collection of Brøderbund's business records, software, and a collection of games that includes Myst, Prince of Persia, and Where in the World is Carmen Sandiego? to The Strong National Museum of Play. The Strong National Museum of Play forwarded the collection to the ICHEG museum for preservation.

In 2017, Houghton Mifflin Harcourt offered the Brøderbund, The Print Shop, Calendar Creator, and ClickArt brands for licensing.

=== Products ===
Broderbund scored an early hit with the game Galactic Empire, written by Doug Carlston for the TRS-80. The company's first title for the Apple II, Tank Command, was written by the third Carlston brother, Professor Donal Carlston.

The company became a powerhouse in the educational and entertainment software markets with titles like Fantavision, Choplifter, Apple Panic, Lode Runner, Karateka, Wings of Fury, Prince of Persia, Where in the World is Carmen Sandiego?, The Guardian Legend, Logical Journey of the Zoombinis, and Myst, which stayed the highest grossing home video game for years. Broderbund became one of the most dominant publishers in the computer market of the 1980s, releasing video games for virtually all major computer systems in the United States.

Like most early computer gaming developers, Broderbund began as an Apple II-focused company and began expanding to other platforms as time went along. They released IBM PC ports of a few games very early on, however, it was not until after 1985 that Broderbund would seriously develop for PC compatibles. Due to its strong focus on education titles, it was one of a few developers to actively support the Apple IIGS in the late 1980s. Some of the more popular Broderbund titles were licensed to Western European and Japanese developers and ported to systems in those regions. During the 1990s, Brøderbund mostly concentrated on educational titles for PCs and Macintoshes with a few forays into RPGs and strategy games.

Broderbund published the Print Shop series of desktop publishing making programs; Family Tree Maker (a genealogy program supported by hundreds of CDs of public genealogy data); 3D Home Architect, a program for designing and visualizing family homes; and Banner Mania, a program for designing and printing multi-page banners. By the end of the 1980s, games represented only a few percent of Broderbund's annual sales, which by then were heavily focused in the productivity arena and early education and learning areas.

Just before being acquired by The Learning Company (formerly SoftKey), Broderbund spun off its Living Books series by forming a joint venture with Random House Publishing. Despite the success and quality of the Living Books series, the joint venture was only marginally successful and was dissolved with The Learning Company deal.

For a brief time, Broderbund was involved in the video game console market when it published a few games for the Nintendo Entertainment System (NES) through its New Ventures Division. All of Broderbund's games for the NES, including the port of its own franchises Lode Runner, Spelunker, and Raid on Bungeling Bay, were developed by third-party Japanese companies. Broderbund published some titles that were produced by companies that didn't have a North American subsidiary, such as Irem's Deadly Towers, Compile's The Guardian Legend, Imagineer's The Battle of Olympus, and Legacy of the Wizard, the fourth installment in Nihon Falcom's Dragon Slayer series.

Broderbund also developed and marketed an ill-fated motion sensitive NES controller device called the U-Force, which was operated without direct physical contact between the player and the device. Broderbund also served as distributing agent of Irem's North American NES release of Sqoon, because Irem didn't yet have its own American operation. In 1990, Broderbund sold its New Ventures Division, including manufacturing equipment, inventory, and assets, to then-fledgling company THQ.

Broderbund released in the United States Arsys Software's 1986 third-person action RPG shooter WiBArm.

Broderbund briefly had a board game division, which published Don Carlston's Personal Preference, along with several board game versions of its video games.

== See also ==
- List of companies based in Oregon
- Red Orb Entertainment — Broderbund's game publishing division, later supported by Mindscape
