= Carmen Sandiego (TV series) =

2019 animated television series

- Picture of seasons 1 & 2 opening intro with Carmen Sandiego in the background
- Genre: Action-adventure; Mystery-drama; Edutainment; Spy fiction
- Based on: Carmen Sandiego by Broderbund
- Developed by: Duane Capizzi
- Directed by: Jos Humphrey; Kenny Park; Mike West
- Voices of: Gina Rodriguez; Finn Wolfhard; Michael Hawley; Abby Trott; Paul Nakauchi; Dawnn Lewis; Liam O'Brien
- Theme music composer: Jared Lee Gosselin
- Opening theme: "Carmen Sandiego" performed by Raquel Castro
- Composers: Steve D'Angelo; Lorenzo Castelli
- Countries of origin: Canada; United States
- Original language: English
- No. of seasons: 4
- No. of episodes: 32 (+1 special)

Production
- Executive producers: Caroline Fraser; C.J. Kettler (S1); Anne Loi; Kirsten Newlands (S2–4); Amir Nasrabadi (S3–4)
- Producer: Brian Hulme
- Running time: 33 minutes (episodes 1–2); 24 minutes
- Production companies: WildBrain Studios (Note: Credited as DHX Studios Vancouver for the first and first few two seasons.); HarperCollins Productions; I Can & I Will Productions

Original release
- Network: Netflix
- Release: January 18, 2019 – January 15, 2021

Related
- Where in the World Is Carmen Sandiego?; Where in Time Is Carmen Sandiego?; Where on Earth Is Carmen Sandiego?; Where on Google Earth is Carmen Sandiego?

Carmen Sandiego is an animated television series based on the media franchise by Broderbund. It is the fourth series in the franchise following the PBS game shows Where in the World Is Carmen Sandiego? (1991–1995) and Where in Time Is Carmen Sandiego? (1996–1997), and the Fox Kids animated series Where on Earth Is Carmen Sandiego? (1994–1999).

Produced by Houghton Mifflin Harcourt and WildBrain, the series presents a "serialized look at Carmen's backstory that is told from her perspective", and features many characters drawn from the franchise's 35-year history: Carmen herself, who debuted in the original World video game; The Chief, who took her current form in the World game show; Player, Zack, and Ivy from the Earth animated series; Chase Devineaux from the video game Word Detective and Julia Argent from the video game Treasures of Knowledge.

The first season was released on January 18, 2019, on Netflix. A second season was released on October 1, 2019. A third season was announced on April 24, 2020, and was released on October 1. A fourth and final season was announced on October 2, 2020, and was released on January 15, 2021. In September 2024, it was announced that a puzzle-adventure game which visually resembles and takes "plot cues" from the series would be released in the first quarter of 2025.

== Premise ==
An orphan girl codenamed Black Sheep was found on the side of a road in Buenos Aires, Argentina, roughly 20 years ago and is raised and trained to become a master thief by a group of villains who double as the faculty at V.I.L.E. Academy, a school for thieves and secret criminal organization, located on the Isle of V.I.L.E. in the Canary Islands.

Black Sheep considers the island and faculty her home and family until she learns the organization's true nature. After seeing how much harm V.I.L.E causes, she goes rogue, escapes the island at the age of 19, and adopts the name Carmen Sandiego. Now, in her early 20s, she seeks to take down V.I.L.E. by stealing things they have already stolen, returning them to their rightful place or owner and stopping their future heists and plans from being executed. Carmen's friends and team are white-hat hacker Player, who works as recon tech support, and Boston siblings Zack (former race car driver) and Ivy (car mechanic/tech repairwoman) who help her on-site and often act as distractions or operate various get-away vehicles. She treats each one of them with care like they're her own family, and together, they set out to thwart V.I.L.E.'s criminal schemes all while on the run from the mysterious law enforcement agency, A.C.M.E., who have set their sights on arresting V.I.L.E and Carmen, whom they suspect has connections to V.I.L.E.

A recurring theme is that both V.I.L.E. and A.C.M.E. make mistaken assumptions about Carmen's actions and intentions.

In season one, Carmen is a modern-day Robin Hood, traveling the globe, stealing from V.I.L.E. and giving back to its victims. Cloaked in red, she is accompanied by her hacker Player, and her best friends Zack and Ivy. Carmen is publicly perceived as a master criminal by most law enforcement agencies due to the sheer scale and theatricality of her heists. The audience follows her escapades and learns why she became a super thief, getting to determine not only where, but "who" in the world is Carmen Sandiego?.

In season two, Carmen seeks answers about her past, while V.I.L.E. attempts to keep their finances from plummeting even further into the red. The Faculty attempt to find a new fifth member after Shadowsan joins Carmen. Thanks to Julia's (a former Interpol agent who works for A.C.M.E.) encouragement, Carmen and the Chief make a loose alliance to take down V.I.L.E..

In season three, Carmen has been off the grid for months, looking for clues to her mother's identity. Julia quits A.C.M.E., after Chief has become too blinded by distrust toward Carmen, for stealing intel on her father from them, to see that she isn't stealing from anyone. V.I.L.E. sets up base in the mountains of Scotland, sending new agents after Carmen who were specifically trained to capture her.

In season four, after several failed attempts to claim gold, including the lost hidden treasures stolen by the past generations of the organization, V.I.L.E. has been pushed to its limits and they start using robot operatives. After Carmen exposes V.I.L.E's secret treasure stash in the Pyramids in Egypt, they eventually capture and brainwash Carmen, who turns into an evil VILE operative and loses all her former memories, who then quickly rebuilds their funds and gains the Faculty's favor. However, Graham helps A.C.M.E. and Shadowsan bring the real Carmen back bringing down V.I.L.E. in the process. Carmen finally tracks down and meets her mother in Argentina. Shadowsan retires and reunites with his brother in Japan, while Zack and Ivy join A.C.M.E. in crime-fighting. After the downfall of V.I.L.E. with its leaders apprehended, A.C.M.E. chases down its remaining members, with the occasional help from Carmen.

== Characters ==
=== Main/Team Red ===
- Carmen Sandiego / "Black Sheep" (voiced by Gina Rodriguez) – The eponymous protagonist and heroine, Carmen is a former student of V.I.L.E. who seeks to dissolve the group and donate its stolen funds to humanitarian causes; this Carmen is notably different than previous incarnations, who were leaders of V.I.L.E. and lady thieves. Initially, Carmen believed that she was found as an abandoned baby on the roadside of Buenos Aires, Argentina 20 years ago, taking her name from the brand name tag in a hat she used in her escape disguise. By the end of the second season, Carmen learns that she is the daughter of former V.I.L.E. faculty member Dexter Wolfe, who was killed by the mysterious Chief of A.C.M.E. during an ambush by Interpol and assassination attempt by V.I.L.E., and that her mother may still be alive.
- Player (voiced by Finn Wolfhard) – A white-hat hacker from Niagara Falls, Ontario who helps Carmen plan her heists, gives her intel about the places she visits and keeps her updated on the local authorities, V.I.L.E. activity, or any possibilities she may have missed. Player is inspired by the live-action character of the same name from Where on Earth Is Carmen Sandiego?, who in turn is a reference to people playing the video games. In Season 4, his last name is revealed to be Bouchard.
- Zack (voiced by Michael Hawley) and Ivy (voiced by Abby Trott) – Siblings from South Boston helping Carmen after they met during a Donut shop heist which was a V.I.L.E. front; they are inspired by the A.C.M.E. detectives of the same names from Where on Earth Is Carmen Sandiego?. Ivy, the older of the two, often runs interference for Carmen, either through disguises or her engineering skills; she also is much more well-read than Zack, who habitually makes mistakes about their discoveries and is less experienced with going undercover.

=== A.C.M.E. ===
A.C.M.E. (short for Agency to Classify & Monitor Evildoers) is the secret global detective and law enforcement agency that often combats V.I.L.E. and the anti-heroes of the series. In this iteration, they seek out finding proof leading to the dissolution of the criminal organization through the means of finding and capturing Carmen and her crew for intel on them.

- The Chief / Tamara Fraser (voiced by Dawnn Lewis) – Head of A.C.M.E. and supervises all of the organization; she is inspired by the Chief from the PBS game shows. She has only appeared via hologram in most of the series but believes Carmen may be a lead to helping A.C.M.E. prove the existence and downfall of V.I.L.E. By the end of season 2, it is revealed that her name is Tamara Fraser and that she was the one who killed Carmen's father, Dexter Wolfe, the night she was taken in by Shadowsan.
- Chase Devineaux (voiced by Rafael Petardi) – A French Interpol inspector turned A.C.M.E. recruit; he is inspired by the A.C.M.E. agent of the same name from Carmen Sandiego Word Detective. He, along with Julia, is one of the only two agents to get close enough to see Carmen's face. He is inept, arrogant, pompous, and constantly overestimating his own abilities. By the end of the first season, Chase is put into mental strain caused by a device Brunt and Shadowsan used to force him to answer their questions. In season 2, after waking up from his coma, he provides a lead, but is dismissed and returned to Interpol with a desk job. However, he is fired for going off the grid in pursuit of Carmen and finds the Isle of V.I.L.E. only after it was destroyed. By the season 2 finale, A.C.M.E. rehires him after Carmen steals from their databanks and eventually gains a higher opinion of him after his success in preventing 'Carmen' from stealing priceless masks.
- Julia Argent (voiced by Charlet Chung) – An Interpol agent turned A.C.M.E. recruit, Chase's partner and opposite: she usually does the logistics and fact-finding that Chase would otherwise overlook or disregard; is more highly intelligent, competent and perceptive; and is the most open to believing Carmen is instead stealing from other thieves. She is inspired by the A.C.M.E. detective of the same name from Where in the World Is Carmen Sandiego? Treasures of Knowledge. In season 2, Julia actively tries to recruit Carmen as an A.C.M.E. agent despite being undermined by the Chief's focus to outright arrest Carmen to gain intel on V.I.L.E. She, along with Chase Devineaux, is one of the only two officers to get close enough to see Carmen's face. She is also the only A.C.M.E. agent to visibly keep her job for the whole of both seasons until season 3, when she quits due to the Chief's mistaken assumptions with Carmen.
- Zari (voiced by Sharon Muthu; main – season 2) – A longtime pursuant of Carmen Sandiego's, who becomes Argent's partner in season 2. While focused and efficient, her loyalty is shown to lie with the Chief and not her partner. She is later partnered with Devineaux in season 3.

=== V.I.L.E. ===
V.I.L.E. (short for Villains' International League of Evil) is a shadowy international crime syndicate of thieves and the main antagonists of the series. Its undercover name is Valuable Imports, Lavish Exports. Their origins date back to the medieval ages where the original founders pillaged trades routes, ancient monuments, and tombs. According to the Chief, their operations have been involved in manipulating financial markets and contaminating food staples in the past decades. Their headquarters are located on one of the Canary Islands and use the academy there to train their new recruits for a one-year semester. As of the end of Season 2, V.I.L.E. Island was destroyed after the V.I.L.E. Faculty believed that A.C.M.E. had found their location. V.I.L.E. was relocated to a castle in Scotland in Season 3.

==== The Faculty ====
A council of five masterminds who are the leaders of V.I.L.E., the instructors of V.I.L.E. Academy, and the primary antagonists of the series; Carmen considered them the only family she knew before betraying them. They each have equal authority, and reach decisions by a majority vote; thus they try to ensure an odd number is always present.

- Professor Gunnar Maelstrom (voiced by Liam O'Brien) – A Swedish-Norwegian psychiatrist and teacher of psychological manipulation. Sinister and quite psychotic, often the classic Machiavellian-type villain and coming off as creepy to the V.I.L.E. graduates and faculty. Unlike his 1994 series counterpart, Maelstrom is part of V.I.L.E. itself, often acting as the leader, mediator, and head spokesperson for the faculty as a group.
- Coach Brunt (voiced by Mary Elizabeth McGlynn) – A Texan coach and teacher of combat and physical training. She was Carmen's favorite teacher, and the two had soft spots for each other. Carmen always thought that Coach Brunt was the one who found her, so the two shared a good relationship. Brunt, like the other faculty members, was quite upset over Carmen's betrayal. However, it seems that Carmen still has a soft spot for Coach Brunt, despite her true motivations.
- Countess Cleo (voiced by Toks Olagundoye) – An Egyptian wealthy debutant and teacher of culture, class, and forgery. She seems to not really care that much about Carmen, and always tries to use her etiquette lessons to get rid of Carmen's rebellious streak. Her crimes deal with obtaining fine art and fashion which she keeps for short periods before selling them off. Her name is based on that of Pharaoh Cleopatra.
- Dr. Saira Bellum (voiced by Sharon Muthu) – An Indian mad scientist and V.I.L.E.'s master inventor, responsible for creating all of the many gadgets and tools V.I.L.E. uses in their heists and schemes. She is shown to be slightly more reasonable than the other faculty, though still willing to destroy the food supply of Indonesia just to shill in a market for an artificial commercial brand; she also has trouble understanding metaphors. She tends to multitask even during council meetings, focusing on numerous screens of information, much to Maelstrom's annoyance. Her name is a pun on the word cerebellum, a part of the brain.
- Shadowsan (voiced by Paul Nakauchi; main – season 2) – A Japanese master thief, skilled swordsman, assassin, and a former member of the V.I.L.E. Faculty teaching stealth and covert thievery. He gave a test where students had to find and steal a dollar from his coat when Carmen was still in school and emptied his coat so she would not be able to find the dollar, which caused Carmen's need to outdo Tigress. In the season one finale, Shadowsan reveals that he was really on Carmen's side all her life and that he was the one who found her in Argentina when she was a baby. He is a secret member of Carmen's team as well, providing her with a new drive on V.I.L.E.'s financial data at the end of the season. By season 2, his betrayal is revealed and he becomes an enemy of V.I.L.E. while helping Carmen foil their plans. In "The Daisho Caper", his real name is revealed to be Suhara, having stolen his katana from his brother decades earlier and regretting the life he chose. In the season 2 finale, Suhara joins Carmen's search to find her mother, who went into hiding just before Wolfe's death. In the 1994 animated series and Carmen Sandiego Adventures in Math, Suhara was a Japanese detective who mentored Carmen when she was an A.C.M.E. agent.
- Roundabout / Nigel Braithwaite (voiced by Trevor Devall) – A British veteran V.I.L.E. operative and MI6 double-agent who is the chief of the agency and takes the place of Shadowsan at the end of season 2. He utilizes his influence in British Intelligence to give V.I.L.E. a leg up on any law enforcement that may zero in on their operations, as well as divert attention away with proper diversionary substance. By the end of Season 3, he is exposed to world as a criminal for stealing the Crown Jewels.

==== V.I.L.E. Operatives ====
- Tigress / Sheena (voiced by Kari Wahlgren) – A spy with a literal catsuit with claws and a technological mask to match her namesake, who is particularly antagonistic toward Carmen, even while at the academy. She is based on the character of the same name from the original 1994 animated series; though, unlike the original, who was nothing more than a disguise donned by Ivy, Tigress is a separate person in the 2019 continuum. She is the longest-running combatant against Carmen, who felt like she needed to prove she was better than Tigress at pick-pocketing due to Tigress acing a test set by Shadowsan that Carmen failed (however, this is only because Shadowsan cheated so Carmen could fail). Tigress also dislikes Paper Star. In the interactive special, it is shown that in spite of her dislike of Carmen, Tigress is still capable of returning the favor if Carmen helps her out, showing that she has a sense of honor.
- El Topo / Antonio (voiced by Andrew Pifko) and Le Chèvre / Jean Paul (voiced by Bernardo de Paula) – A pair of V.I.L.E. operatives who used to be in Carmen's group of friends before she left. El Topo is a wisecracking Spanish spy with streamlined powerful digging gauntlets, while Le Chèvre is a no-nonsense French spy with incredible parkour and climbing skills. In the interactive special, if Carmen works with El Topo, he holds no hostility towards her, stating his belief they are just pawns in the game of life; Le Chèvre, on the other hand, will taunt her. With the destruction of V.I.L.E. at the end of season 4, they open a food truck together as partners. In September 2021, series creator Duane Capizzi confirmed that Le Chèvre and El Topo were a gay couple.
- Mime Bomb – A silent spy and mute informant who dresses as a mime artist for public camouflage. He is usually used by the faculty to spy and snitch on the students, which is also how the faculty found out that Carmen had stowed away. However, they sometimes wonder if it was a good idea to hire a mime as a spy since they can't really understand what he's trying to say though he does communicate through charades and sign language.
- Paper Star (voiced by Kimiko Glenn) – A psychopathic master of origami weapons, she is Maelstrom's favorite pupil. In contrast, Shadowsan rightfully believes Paper Star to be too psychotic to carry out orders, as Paper Star refused to hand over the stolen goods to Le Chèvre per V.I.L.E. protocol. Paper Star has little combat experience outside of her origami techniques such as throwing paper shurikens whenever they have been negated.
- Dash Haber (voiced by Troy Baker) – Countess Cleo's executive courier and personal assistant. Dash Haber's main weapon is his hat, which is embellished with razor-sharp blades and can be thrown and retrieved through magnets in his gloves. His name is a pun of the word haberdasher.
- The Cleaners / Vlad and Boris (voiced by Liam O'Brien) – Two Russian men who not just have janitorial duties as the cleaning crew at V.I.L.E. but they are also the men-in-black who are deployed to extricate V.I.L.E. members who have failed their missions by being apprehended and "Scrub" any evidence of V.I.L.E.'s existence. They are based on Rick and Nick ICK, commonly known as The ICK Brothers, a pair of V.I.L.E. henchmen who had similar jobs, seen in the 1996 edition of Where in the World is Carmen Sandiego?.
- Cookie Booker (voiced by Rita Moreno) – V.I.L.E.'s bookkeeper and financier; she believes in white collar crime above other forms. Rita Moreno was the voice of Carmen Sandiego in the 1994 animated series, a connection subtly referenced when Carmen steals her trademark outfit from Booker as a kind of "passing of the torch."
- Lady Dokuso (voiced by Sumalee Montano) – a veteran V.I.L.E. operative who is a prominent poison expert stationed in Tokyo, where she runs a nightclub frequented by Yakuza and noted to be a woman of great skill. She has excellent reflexes, having been able to effectively repel an attack from Paper Star using only an umbrella. She also displayed skillful acrobatics during fights with Shadowsan.
- Neal the Eel (voiced by Rhys Darby) – A New Zealander thief that wears a wet suit allowing him to slip through vents, tight spaces, and anyone that attempts to grab him. He mostly works for Dr. Bellum. His offensive weapons are a pair of tasers.
- Spin Kick (voiced by Dante Basco) – A member of V.I.L.E. Academy's newest graduated class that specializes in kickboxing and is partnered with Fly Trap.
- Fly Trap (voiced by Sarah-Nicole Robles) – A member of V.I.L.E. Academy's newest graduated class that wields a pair of bolas and is partnered with Spin Kick. Carmen outwits her by using the bolas in ricochet attacks to catch Fly Trap off guard.
- The Troll (voiced by Osric Chau) – A Korean skilled computer tech and internet hacker who is considered an evil counterpart to Player. He has demonstrated as high proficiency in encryption breaking, hacking and data collection like Player. The Troll hates it when people call him simply "Troll", though he admits that it's not always best to pronounce it that way.

==== Former V.I.L.E. operatives ====
- Graham Calloway (voiced by Michael Goldsmith) – Also known as Gray or Crackle, Graham is an Australian electrician, an Ex-V.I.L.E. operative and Carmen's former best friend at V.I.L.E. Academy. However, after a failed mission, Graham had his memories erased by Bellum. He returned to Australia where he met up with Carmen once again (only this time, he didn't remember her) and asked her out for coffee. However she left before she even got there, because she thought that Gray had a chance to start over, and that Carmen Sandiego would ruin that chance. In "The Crackle Goes Kiwi Caper", Carmen recruits him to help her infiltrate Dr. Bellum's New Zealand lab, but upon his realizing Carmen's true mission, he helps destroy Bellum's experiment; they then finally have coffee together and talk more. By the end of season 3, it is revealed that Graham has been spied on by A.C.M.E. since then, acknowledging that he is the last and only link they have to Carmen, and it is hinted they intend to bring him in.
- Dexter Wolfe / The Wolf – Carmen's late father and Shadowsan's predecessor as both a member of the V.I.L.E. Faculty and Stealth 101 Professor at V.I.L.E. Academy, he was a master thief who was often allowed to leave V.I.L.E. Island due to his expertise, though he preferred stealing for the thrill rather than for selfish gain. However, when Carmen was born, the rest of the faculty realized that he was planning to leave the organization and sent Shadowsan to assassinate him. By this point, he was attempting to make his escape with Baby Carmen to be reunited with his wife "Vera Cruz" but was accidentally killed instead by the current Chief of A.C.M.E. after hiding Carmen in the closet, leaving her to be taken to V.I.L.E. Island by Shadowsan.

=== Civilians ===
- Dr. Pilar Marquez (voiced by Carla Tassara) – Dr. Pilar Marquez is an archaeologist hunting for the Ecuador 8 Escudos. She appears in The Fishy Doubloon Caper.
- Miro (voiced by Andrew Pifko) – Miro is tour guide and an Aboriginal Australian. Team Red paid him to travel to Uluru. He waited as he observed the Team stop the rocket launch hijacking. He appears in The Opera in the Outback Caper.
- Dr. Jeanine Dennam (voiced by Sharon Muthu) – Dr. Jeanine Denman is a scientist for HelioGem working on the Boomerang, a rocket. She appears in The Opera in the Outback Caper.
- Hideo (voiced by Mike Hagiwara) – Hideo is the museum curator of Matsumoto Castle in Japan and is Shadowsan's brother. He first appears in The Daisho Caper.

== Episodes ==
=== Series overview ===
Season	Episodes	Originally released
1	9	January 18, 2019
2	10	October 1, 2019
Special		March 10, 2020
3	5	October 1, 2020
4	8	January 15, 2021

=== Season 1 (2019) ===
No. overall	No. in season	Title	Directed by	Written by	Original release date
1	1	"Becoming Carmen Sandiego" (Part 1)	Jos Humphrey and Kenny Park	Duane Capizzi	January 18, 2019
In the present, Carmen Sandiego robs the Poitiers estate of Countess Cleo, a V.I.L.E. Academy professor, and is pursued by French Interpol Inspector Chase Devineaux and his junior partner Julia Argent. Fleeing the scene on a train to Paris, Carmen is cornered by her old classmate and V.I.L.E. agent Graham—codenamed "Crackle"—as she lured him to the train knowing there was a tracker in the item she stole. In the past, Carmen, a mischievous orphan originally given the codename "Black Sheep" by her mentor Coach Brunt, grows up on V.I.L.E. Isle—a remote island home to V.I.L.E. Academy, a secluded school for thieves—but longs for the opportunity to see the outside world. After pickpocketing a phone from a staff member, she is called by a white hat hacker called "Player" who hacked into the V.I.L.E. network out of curiosity, and the two build a covert friendship. Black Sheep enrolls in V.I.L.E. Academy, but when she takes her final exams, she fails a test with Instructor Shadowsan, and cannot graduate. Nonetheless, she sneaks aboard the graduates' helicopter to follow them on their mission.
2	2	"Becoming Carmen Sandiego" (Part 2)	Jos Humphrey and Kenny Park	Duane Capizzi	January 18, 2019
Seeing her classmates going on their first mission, Black Sheep crashes the graduates' caper after touching down at an archaeological dig site near Casablanca. There, Black Sheep meets with the dig leader and develops an appreciation for history and culture, but the camp soon comes under attack by the graduates. She saves the dig leader from Gray, but is captured and returned to V.I.L.E. Isle. Now disillusioned with V.I.L.E., she resolves to escape from the island and begin stealing from them to dissolve the organization. Recovering her phone, she calls Player to enlist his help and narrowly escapes, stealing a hard-drive with all of V.I.L.E.'s funding and prospective capers for the next year. As she leaves, she takes the name "Carmen Sandiego" from the brand name stitched onto the hat she used as a disguise. Back in the present, Carmen defeats Crackle and leaves him for Devineaux. Meanwhile, Argent finds the stolen diamond from the dig in Morocco, which Carmen left it to be recovered by the authorities. Carmen escapes through Paris' canals as two unidentified agents hone on her, and report to their "Chief" that they have her in their sights.
3	3	"The Sticky Rice Caper"	Kenny Park	May Chan	January 18, 2019
Escaping on the River Seine, the pair of unidentified agents pursue Carmen, but she escapes with the help of her partners: Bostonian twins Zack and Ivy. Player navigates the trio to a secret lab in Java, Indonesia, where V.I.L.E. is developing a fungus designed to destroy the country's rice supply—after which, they would promote their V.I.L.E. imitation rice. Meanwhile, before Devineaux and Argent can interview Crackle, the "Cleaners" pick him up and take him back to V.I.L.E. Isle, erasing all evidence he was there. V.I.L.E. also orders "Tigress", Carmen's class rival, to intercept her. Carmen's team track the supply truck carrying the bioweapon to a shadow-puppet festival, planning to covertly disperse the fungus in fireworks. Carmen engages Tigress in combat and is defeated, but Zack and Ivy successfully swap the bad fireworks with the real ones during the fight. Later, the team gets rid of the fungus after the festival's celebration. Back on V.I.L.E. island, Crackle is brought before Dr. Bellum for debriefing, and she plugs a device on his head. The next day, the two unknown agents report to their Chief that they lost Carmen again, with the Chief telling them to begin "Plan B".
4	4	"The Fishy Doubloon Caper"	Jos Humphrey	Becky Tinker	January 18, 2019
While exploring a shipwreck off the coast of Ecuador, Carmen stumbles upon hidden treasure in the form of an old gold coin, but her old classmate "El Topo" battles her underwater for it while his partner "Le Chèvre" confronts Zack and Ivy. The chase continues to the mainland after a tuna swallows it, gets caught by fishermen and then later put on sale at a fish auction. Carmen meets with local archaeologist Dr. Pilar Marquez, who tells Carmen of the historical value of the Ecuadorian doubloon back in the 19th century, prompting Carmen to find it and return it to the doctor. Chèvre and Topo also pursue the coin, believing that if Carmen is after it, then it must be worth a fortune. Reaching a fish market in Quito, Carmen faints from altitude sickness, but Pilar finds and treats her. After Zack and Ivy find the right fish at the auction, a fight with Topo and Chèvre allows Carmen a chance to reclaim the coin without their knowing. Carmen gives the coin to Pilar, and the two part ways as friends, as Carmen must intercept another V.I.L.E. target in the Rijksmuseum. Meanwhile, as Devineaux and Argent part ways after a long day, the two agents kidnap Devineaux to have a holographic conference call with the Chief of A.C.M.E, who is determined to prove the existence of V.I.L.E. and believes Carmen can lead them to it. During the call, Argent finds them and both she and Devineaux are recruited to A.C.M.E.
5	5	"The Duke of Vermeer Caper"	Kenny Park	Greg Ernstrom	January 18, 2019
In Amsterdam, Carmen goes undercover to stop Countess Cleo, who's been replacing priceless paintings with forgeries and plans to sell them off to the highest bidder. Carmen steals the last Vermeer painting on the list, and sets up a meeting. But awaiting their contact, Zack mistakenly opens the door to Cleo's assistant; Dash Haber and, as "The Duke", accepts the invitation to a dinner party and auction, giving the crew only 24 hours to save the mission; while Devineaux and Argent search for "The Dutchess", unaware that she is Carmen's alias. After preparing and following Zack, Carmen spots and eludes a following Devineaux. As Zack meets with and distracts the Countess at the dinner, Carmen infiltrates her manor in the Swiss Alps to switch the stolen Vermeer collection with blanks. When dessert is being handed out, Cleo serves caviar, and Zack, who has a fear of fish, is saved when Devineaux arrives to warn them and the party guests that Carmen Sandiego is near; coincidentally allowing Carmen more time to steal all the paintings. Zack then points out the window and Devineaux sees a woman with a red cloak motor-skiing away, prompting the agent to give chase after her. Cleo declares the party over and later finds her collection gone. Devineaux catches up with "Carmen", but it turns out to be Ivy pretending to be a tourist, while Zack and Carmen escape with the paintings. The next day, A.C.M.E. finds the chateau destroyed and no trace remaining, as well as all Vermeer paintings returned. Meanwhile, in Sydney, Crackle gets off a bus in front of the Sydney Opera House.
6	6	"The Opera in the Outback Caper"	Jos Humphrey	Becky Tinker	January 18, 2019
In Australia at the Sydney Opera House during an Opera, Carmen finds Crackle, not recognizing her and going by Graham again. Carmen later finds and fights Le Chèvre, who deploys a low-frequency sound-wave generating device on the show and its audience, including Carmen, and leaves. Player analyzes Carmen's commlink device's data and finds a hypnotic subliminal message in it by Dr. Saira Bellum directed at Jeanine Dennam, a Helio-Gem rocket scientist who was in the audience. Outside, after the opera, Graham asks Carmen, who was asking for his help in finding an outback guide, out on a date. Reaching the outback the next day, Carmen and her team tour around Uluru as the Helio-Gem base is nearby. Player and Carmen then deduce V.I.L.E.'s plan: launch a defective "Boomerang" rocket to rain debris over the outback, forcing Helio-Gem out and allowing V.I.L.E. to take over their contracts. At the launch station, Zack and Ivy protect Dennam, while Carmen keeps the rocket grounded. As El Topo hacks the station's audio system to play the trigger music, Zack and Ivy restrain Dennam, but Carmen falls victim to the hypnosis and starts the 3 minute launch sequence. Zack and Ivy handle Topo and Chèvre respectively, and once Carmen returns to normal, she stops the rocket. When Carmen goes to meet Graham, she decides that he'll be better off without 'Carmen Sandiego' back in his life. While on the Isle of V.I.L.E., Professor Maelstrom assigns the next agent to fight Carmen Sandiego.
7	7	"The Chasing Paper Caper"	Kenny Park	Greg Ernstrom	January 18, 2019
Professor Gunnar Maelstrom schemes to steal all 17 pages of Magna Carta, with origami weapons expert Paper Star, despite Shadowsan viewing Paper Star as unpredictable. In Mumbai, India, Carmen predicts Maelstrom's plan and fights defensively, but is restrained and unable to stop Paper Star. When Le Chèvre meets with Paper Star at the rendezvous, she paper-cuts his hands to make him reveal the next drop location in Agra. Player finds Paper Star on surveillance and he and Carmen track her to a train in Agra City, where Devineaux and Argent are also on after catching her trail back at the museum where the theft occurred. Carmen gets confronted by Devineaux in a car, but manages to cuff him to a seat and swipes his A.C.M.E. ID Keycard. She then meets and greets Argent in the dining car for a short talk before leaving; Argent realizes that she met Carmen and looks for Devineaux. Carmen and Paper Star clash again, but Carmen gets the upper hand by leading the fight to the roof where the wind counters the origami weapons. As Carmen retrieves Magna Carta, Argent finds Devineaux, and Carmen covertly leaves Magna Carta for Argent. When asking Player to hack Devineaux's A.C.M.E. keycard, she finds that Paper Star took it off her during their fight. Back on The Isle of V.I.L.E., Paper Star submits the keycard to the Faculty as a consolation prize.
8	8	"The Lucky Cat Caper"	Jos Humphrey	May Chan	January 18, 2019
In San Francisco, Carmen attends an elegant charity auction. After buying a car for Zack, she discovers Mime Bomb stole a rare stamp worth $10,000,000. Following him to Chinatown, he stashed the stamp in a maneki-neko. Shadowsan sends in Tigress to pick up the stamp, and Coach Brunt secretly sends the Cleaners as unseen backup, while Bellum is trying to hack the A.C.M.E. keycard. As Carmen battles Tigress over the lucky cat, tricking her with bait and switch, the statue was Mime Bomb's diversion to hold the real stamp. After encountering Devineaux and Argent, he slips the stamp into Devineaux's coat. At Fisherman's Wharf, Tigress rendezvouses with Mime Bomb and covertly steals the stamp from Devineaux's coat; leading Carmen, and by extent Devineaux, on a car chase to the Golden Gate Bridge. Devineaux crashes his A.C.M.E. car into the bay, while the Cleaners rendezvous to get Tigress, but Carmen manages to swipe the stamp from her and escapes with Tigress' phone to call V.I.L.E. and gloat. Despite the defeat, Dr. Bellum announces she learned the owner of the keycard: Chase Devineaux.
9	9	"The French Connection Caper"	Kenny Park	Duane Capizzi	January 18, 2019
Studying Devineaux, the Faculty find he is always there where Carmen appears, seeing him as a partner. Shadowsan and Brunt are elected to interrogate Devineaux. After debriefing with Chief, Devineaux accuses Argent of being Carmen Sandiego's "silent partner", and upon returning home, the Cleaners capture him and leave a message on the Dark Web for Carmen. Meanwhile, in the basement of Cleo's residence in Poitiers, Chase is put into mental strain caused by a device Brunt and Shadowsan are using to force him to answer their questions. Arriving at the house, Zack and Ivy each disguise as Carmen to lure the Faculty members out while the real Carmen breaks in to rescue Devineaux, but when Brunt corners Zack, she realizes the trick and races back. Carmen sneaks in to save Devineaux and she frees him and just before passing out, he calls the Chief, who greets Carmen before alerting Argent and the police to his location. Before Carmen can move Devineaux, Brunt returns and overwhelms Carmen, making one final offer to return, which Carmen rejects. As Brunt attempts to bearhug Carmen to death, Shadowsan returns and stuns Brunt unconscious and helps open a locked grate for him and Carmen to escape together in, which makes her slowly figure out that he was the one who found her 20 years ago. He then helps the injured Carmen escape before the authorities arrive, but Brunt also awakens and escapes before capture. Elsewhere, Shadowsan reveals that he was always looking out for and trying to protect Carmen and had intentionally failed her knowing that she'd reject V.I.L.E.'s mission. He tried joining her escape, but she got away without him, but not before he sabotaged the Cleaner's air-transport. Argent reports to Chief of Devineaux's condition, and The Chief believes Carmen took his keycard to lure Devineaux into a trap, while Argent remains uncertain. As Shadowsan vanishes when Carmen relays everything with Player, he leaves behind another V.I.L.E. hard-drive for her next series of capers.

=== Season 2 (2019) ===
No. overall	No. in season	Title	Directed by	Written by	Original release date
10	1	"The Hot Rocks of Rio Caper" (Part 1)	Jos Humphrey	Becky Tinker	October 1, 2019
One week after learning Shadowsan's true alignment, Carmen's distracted mind leads her to fumble a mission in Prague, but she still obtains a clue pointing to an Alexandrite mining operation by V.I.L.E. in Rio de Janeiro. The Faculty debate Shadowsan's disappearance as Le Chèvre reports mission success in the Alexandrite mining. Meanwhile, Devineaux wakes from his coma and gives details regarding Brunt and Shadowsan, but Chief has him put on permanent leave for his recklessness. Devineaux is forced to return to Interpol to work a boring desk job; Argent is partnered with Agent Zari and sent to Rio after CrimeNet deduced Carmen to be there. In Rio, Zack and Ivy get information from a dealer, and come upon Le Chèvre, who flees. Carmen gives chase, but her mind once again becomes distracted, causing her to lose Le Chèvre in the surrounding neighborhood. A distressed Carmen is invited by a kind family to dinner, and they inform her of a likely V.I.L.E. safe house. There, Carmen finds a tunnel to the V.I.L.E. mining operation, but gets caught by Tigress, Le Chèvre and El Topo. Shadowsan then steps out of the shadows to congratulate them.
11	2	"The Hot Rocks of Rio Caper" (Part 2)	Kenny Park	Greg Ernstrom	October 1, 2019
Shadowsan elaborates to the V.I.L.E. agents about his scarcity as to being on Carmen's trail while pretending to earn her trust, but he drops a code phrase which informs Carmen of his true allegiance. When Le Chèvre states an inaccuracy, Shadowsan uses his position to detain him and takes Carmen away. Tigress informs the Faculty of Shadowsan being there, relaying his story which reveals his treachery, and they contemplate the extent of his infiltration. Elsewhere, Carmen's crew decides to work with Shadowsan to stop V.I.L.E.'s plan, while Argent and Zari follow sightings of Carmen. During the Rio Carnival, Carmen's team realize V.I.L.E.'s planning to use the Carnival as cover to use a Duck boat to covertly deliver the gems from Rio to Prague, and find a stray Dragon float. Intercepting on the water, Carmen and Shadowsan successfully retrieve the gemstones, and disguise the float as a duck to escape. Carmen uses her charity foundation, Black Sheep Inc., to open a community fund for the family that gave her dinner and their neighbors, with the value of the gemstones. As Shadowsan ponders what to do now that he blew his cover, Carmen invites him to join her. Agents Argent and Zari find them, but lose the thieves in the crowd, but an image capture of Shadowsan inadvertently links Carmen to V.I.L.E.
12	3	"The Daisho Caper"	Kenny Park	Greg Ernstrom	October 1, 2019
As Carmen awakes in Matsumoto, Nagano in Japan, Shadowsan has once more vanished. At Matsumoto Castle, she learns Shadowsan's Katana is part of a Daishō, realizing he stole the other half of the pair. Meeting with him, Shadowsan aims to return the katana and Player informs them that V.I.L.E.'s plotting to steal the short sword to draw him out, leading Carmen to steal the sword before V.I.L.E. can. She encounters Paper Star, who distracts her so Lady Dokuso, a veteran V.I.L.E. agent, can retrieve the Tantō; reporting her success, she is offered to replace Shadowsan should she prevail. Later, Carmen confronts Shadowsan about the importance between him and the swords and of learning his true name 'Suhara' from the curator, who is revealed to be his elder brother—Hideo. Shadowsan explains that, while Hideo was content with his scholar's livelihood, Suhara was not content living poor and became a thief. To prove himself, he stole the katana while Hideo saved the Tantō, and has regretted the choice ever since. Now understanding, Ivy covertly disarms the guards before Shadowsan fights, while Carmen fights Paper Star for the Tantō and entraps her. As Dokuso poisons Shadowsan into being temporarily paralyzed, Carmen arrives and forces Dokuso to flee. They return the Daishō to Matsumoto Castle, and Suhara pleads with Hideo. While he still does not forgive Suhara, he allows him to return the sword. Shadowsan then joins Carmen's crew, no longer calling Japan home.
13	4	"The Fashionista Caper"	Jos Humphrey	Becky Tinker	October 1, 2019
After failing to stop V.I.L.E. Agent Dash Haber from stealing smart-fabric in Greece, Player finds chatter leading the team to Fashion Fest in Milan, where V.I.L.E.'s plan will be enacted and Shadowsan deduces that Countess Cleo and Dr. Bellum are working together on a caper, likely an idea from an operative aiming to replace him as Faculty. V.I.L.E. accountant Cookie Booker, in a bid for Shadowsan's old seat, coordinates with Bellum and Cleo in a plan to save V.I.L.E. from debt. Eavesdropping, Carmen learns Dash Haber is adding the smart-fabric to supermodel attire to mind control the models, part of the plan to abscond with original 14th century Medici attire. After evading A.C.M.E., Carmen enlists Argent's aid in securing the gowns, and fights off the mind-controlled models in a secluded space. Once Shadowsan swipes Haber's weaponized chapeau, he and Carmen destroy the mind-control hats, and stop V.I.L.E.'s plan. Taking Shadowsan to a clothing store, he changes his attire to something not as ostentatious as his Wafuku and Player finds a possible HQ location for the crew to have, which coincidentally happens to be the warehouse of the same brand of Carmen's hat she used to escape from the island. On the Isle of V.I.L.E., as Booker's application as Faculty is denied, other operatives are being looked at for the position.
14	5	"The Boston Tea Party Caper"	Kenny Park	Becky Tinker	October 1, 2019
As Carmen's team look at the warehouse building in San Diego for a possible stationery HQ, they tell Shadowsan the story of how they all first met on their very first heist: the Donut Shop Caper. One year prior, Zack and Ivy were a brother-sister racing team trying to earn prize money so they could get out of Southie, but after Zack loses against his rival racer silver spoon Trey Sterling and busts up his car in the process, the siblings had to ask gangster Shark Head Eddie for help, as he was the one who loaned them the money for the car. Eddie gave them a simple job- rob a donut shop which was a front for, according to Eddie, the Mob. It was there they encountered Carmen, who had to keep them safe as V.I.L.E. used the donut shop as a front for printing money with stolen treasury plates. V.I.L.E.'s plan was to print money as a way of buying prime real estate in Boston to expand their influence and enterprises. Despite Carmen's efforts to keep them away, the siblings still gave her help in finding and destroying V.I.L.E.'s money printing, making their own tea party. Realizing they have nothing in Boston, and to avoid Eddie, the siblings opt to join Carmen on her globe trotting capers. Hearing their story, Shadowsan also adds that the V.I.L.E. Faculty had no idea how dangerous Carmen was to them until now. Following the story, Player relays V.I.L.E.'s plan to steal the world's fastest electric car in Dubai, and the team sets out again.
15	6	"The Need For Speed Caper"	Jos Humphrey	Greg Ernstrom	October 1, 2019
V.I.L.E. operative 'The Mechanic' comes from London with a plan: steal the most advanced car in the world to make a fleet of V.I.L.E. super-getaway-cars. As Shadowsan coordinates with Player, Carmen's team goes to Dubai to steal the super car and keep it away from V.I.L.E. As they infiltrate a Palm Jumeirah gala, Zack and Ivy come across Trey Sterling and his father Sterling Sterling, the latter who is supportive of the two unlike Trey. As the caper goes off, Zack is triggered by posters of Trey and makes a scene stealing the car which lands him and Ivy in jail. However, an impressed Sterling Sr. bails them out and offers them a job under him, while Carmen is angered that they risked the mission and calls them amateurs. This leads to the siblings to the conclusion that they weren't meant for the life of thievery and ponder on whether or not to take Sterling Sr.'s offer. The next morning, Zack and Ivy find Trey tied-up, realizing his "girlfriend" was a V.I.L.E. agent, 'The Driver', and follow her across Dubai. Clashing with The Mechanic and The Driver in a getaway blimp, Team Carmen save the car. Afterwards, Carmen waits for Zack and Ivy, who have turned down Sterling Sr.'s offer and rejoin her. As thanks, Carmen buys the warehouse to give the two roots to call home, and Player then calls with a lead in Moscow; Carmen and Shadowsan go, while Zack and Ivy stay behind to remodel their new home.
16	7	"The Crackle Goes Kiwi Caper"	Jos Humphrey	Steven Melching	October 1, 2019
In Moscow, Shadowsan and Carmen encounter Neal the Eel at the Kremlin, but he escapes. Player learns Neal stole project schematics of "The Trip Wire" EMP weapon, which Dr. Bellum will likely improve upon. With Neal involved, Shadowsan deduces Bellum's lab to be in New Zealand. Player urges they need to have a skilled electrician on-site to manage the power grid hack, suggesting Crackle, despite Carmen's wish to protect Graham. Still recruiting him in Sydney for 'a charity opera', they fly him to Auckland. As Graham's memories in V.I.L.E. were wiped, Shadowsan stays at their warehouse HQ, not risking triggering any V.I.L.E. memories or impulses. In the lab, Carmen deletes all Trip Wire data, but runs into Neal upon exiting. As Graham starts the "encore," he realizes the deception, enters Bellum's lab and finds Carmen mid-caper. She exfils Graham to the roof, but Bellum holds Auckland hostage for her capitulation. At the roof, Graham's subconscious V.I.L.E. training allows him to sabotage the Trip Wire, which Bellum destroys upon activating. Carmen finally has coffee with Graham, content V.I.L.E. is unaware of his involvement. Elsewhere, A.C.M.E. tracks Carmen and learns about Graham, believing him to be of use.
17	8	"The Stockholm Syndrome Caper"	Kenny Park and Mike West	Benjamin Townsend	October 1, 2019
With only Four members, V.I.L.E.'s Faculty reach an impasse on whether or not to abandon V.I.L.E. Isle. They ultimately decide to do so once their current class graduates, and motivates them to hunt down Carmen Sandiego. Elsewhere in Stockholm, Ivy dresses as Carmen to play decoy with A.C.M.E. agents, while Argent petitions the Chief to allow her a chance to recruit Carmen- which is approved. Alone, Carmen finds and talks with Argent about stopping a major V.I.L.E. plan; but when Zari spots that Ivy is a decoy, Argent's plan is revoked and Carmen is swarmed by A.C.M.E. agents. Barely escaping, Carmen is hit by tranquilizer gas while escaping, causing her to glide crashing into a forest; and Argent is incensed by Chief's actions. Meanwhile, V.I.L.E. agents 'Otter Man' and 'Moose Boy' capture Ivy, thinking her to be Carmen. With both the girls missing, Player directs Zack to find Ivy, trusting Carmen's survival skills, but Carmen struggles to escape from an icy ravine and survive out in the cold. As Ivy escapes Otter and Moose, she also recovers stolen Gold Codes, completing Carmen's original mission, and reunites with Zack. Carmen reluctantly uses Argent's A.C.M.E. Communicator pen, having swiped it earlier, as a last resort. She activates it to call Chief for help, but faints from the cold before she can ask. It is believed from Chief that she got frostbite and is later given over to her team to get serious medical attention as a show of trust between them.
18	9	"The African Ice Caper"	Jos Humphrey	Steven Melching	October 1, 2019
Carmen's team admit her to a hospital for treatment, then move her to HQ while Shadowsan completes her missions as she recovers. Meanwhile, Devineaux secretly analyzes all of Carmen's past capers, realizing the only anomaly is an isle of the Canary Islands with no data and heads out to investigate. As Carmen works to recover, she heads to Botswana which Player connects to an illegal diamond mining operation. Meanwhile, V.I.L.E. operative "Roundabout" informs Maelstrom of Shadowsan's involvement on a mission, compromising their mining operation. As Carmen's team discover the operation's extent and locate Brunt, Tigress corners Carmen until Zack and Ivy help to subdue her. Carmen calls the Chief for help, and later, Player transmits a visual of the Chief to Shadowsan, who recognizes her, and asks him to trace the signal. As the authorities raid the mine, they narrowly escape a scrubbing trap, giving "proof" to V.I.L.E. of Carmen's collusion with A.C.M.E. On a train to the airport, Carmen promises Chief a better outcome next time and is later captured by Brunt and the Cleaners. Waking up, Brunt doesn't kill her, but informs her that on the night Shadowsan “found her", he killed her father, leaving her tied-up and gagged to reel from the revelation.
19	10	"The Deep Dive Caper"	Kenny Park and Mike West	Duane Capizzi	October 1, 2019
Carmen ventures to the now destroyed Isle of V.I.L.E. to crack the main databank. Devineaux, stranded on the island following Carmen's trail, starts a fire and is then rescued, but was fired during his absence. With their old base gone, the Faculty call Roundabout to inform him that he has been unanimously voted in as the fifth faculty member and his first order of business is to find a new relocation site. After recovering the data, Carmen learns her father was Dexter Wolfe, codenamed "The Wolf"; V.I.L.E. Faculty and Shadowsan's predecessor as teacher of stealth and thievery. Confronting Shadowsan, he reveals Wolfe was mostly absent as a teacher, but always delivered results. The Faculty then learned of his planning to leave V.I.L.E., ordering Shadowsan to remove him. After finding Wolfe's secret family life, Interpol swarmed Wolfe's home that night before Shadowsan could carry out the mission, and Wolfe was accidentally killed by Agent Tamara Fraser, the now Chief of A.C.M.E. After burning Wolfe's house per protocol, Shadowsan saved baby Carmen and her Russian nesting dolls; the Faculty then voted to keep her lineage secret and induct Shadowsan in Wolfe's place. After Player tracks the Chief in Seattle, Carmen confronts her in a coffee shop and leaves behind a V.I.L.E. data-drive, which allows Player to hack A.C.M.E. and corroborate Shadowsan's account. From that file, Carmen also learns her mother "Vera Cruz" faked her death and is somewhere in the world and now sets out to find her as a secondary mission. Enraged by the hack, Chief Fraser reinstates Devineaux to hunt down Carmen, which he gleefully accepts.

=== Special (2020) ===
Title	Directed by	Written by	Original release date
"Carmen Sandiego: To Steal or Not to Steal"	Jos Humphrey; Co-Directed by: Kenny Park and Mike West	Story by : Duane Capizzi, May Chan, Sam Nisson, & Susan O'Connor; Teleplay by : Greg Ernstrom & Becky Tinker	March 10, 2020
In this interactive movie, while attempting to steal from a V.I.L.E. building, Carmen learns that her friends, Zack and Ivy, have been kidnapped by V.I.L.E. and the Faculty threaten to brainwash them into becoming henchmen unless Carmen steals some objects for them. There are multiple endings that can be taken. Upon finding the good endings, a bonus scene will be unlocked, with all of the cast members but Carmen singing the theme song from the 1990s game show.

=== Season 3 (2020) ===
No. overall	No. in season	Title	Directed by	Written by	Original release date
20	1	"The Luchadora Tango Caper"	Jos Humphrey	Duane Capizzi	October 1, 2020
V.I.L.E. relocates to a Scotland castle, with Roundabout, now as the fifth faculty member, still working his double life on their behalf. Roundabout reveals that after weeks and upon months of being off the grid, Carmen has been spotted in Buenos Aires, Argentina. Carmen retrieves a locket with a picture of herself as a baby with her father from his bank's safety deposit box before defeating V.I.L.E.'s new graduate operatives; Spin Kick and Fly Trap in combat. Based on a clue from the picture, Carmen heads to Veracruz, Mexico and discovers her mother is supposedly called Carlotta Valdez. Investigating clues to her identity, Carmen befriends a luchadora with the same name in the process: a masked wrestler who uses the stage name Lupe Peligro and invites the gang to an upcoming wrestling match she is in. Brunt decides to go one last time herself to bring Carmen in, stealing a luchadora mask to hide her face as she attempts to capture Carmen at Lupe's wrestling match. Carmen teams up with Lupe to beat Brunt, who flees back to V.I.L.E. in anger, all while A.C.M.E. agents, Julia and the newly rehired Chase, zone in on her after tracking her to the match.
21	2	"The Day of the Dead Caper"	Mike West	Sharon Flynn	October 1, 2020
As Mexico City celebrates Día de los Muertos, Carmen tracks a young art thief named Sonia who just might be recruited into V.I.L.E. by one of Cleo's art contacts, Marta Contreras. Back at the Castle, The Faculty celebrate Halloween, with an enthusiastic Maelstrom embracing the holiday. Carmen convinces the recruit to use her skills for helping others; the thief takes it to heart and begins tracking down all the art she helped steal. Meanwhile, Shadowsan leads Spin Kick and Fly Trap on a wild goose chase in the southern tip of Africa to keep them off Carmen's trail after failing to capture her in Buenos Aires but double back on her in the Mexican Border after seeing the trick, while Julia decides to quit A.C.M.E. to work in a university; having become tired of Chief's distrust towards Carmen.
22	3	"The Haunted Bayou Caper"	Jos Humphrey	Kathryn Lyn	October 1, 2020
In New Orleans, Carmen and the team track V.I.L.E.'s counterfeiter to a drop point with Tigress and discover he has been making fake tickets for an upcoming event where a celebrity chef called "The Crawfish King" will be hosting a costume gala at his spooky family mansion. V.I.L.E. sends Tigress, Paper Star and the Cleaners to steal the charity money digitally with the help of The Troll's retinal scan app. Carmen's Team goes undercover to save him as Chase, now partner-less, tries his hardest not to bumble and destroy his A.C.M.E. gear; however, Carmen evades him at every step. Zack and Ivy manage to keep the chef away from V.I.L.E long enough until the midnight deadline forces them to give up and Carmen stops Paper Star from stealing the King's Great-Great grandmother's original secret recipe for his Crawfish seasoning that was written in her own handwriting.
23	4	"The Masks of Venice Caper"	Mike West	Steven Melching	October 1, 2020
V.I.L.E. plots to steal priceless masks from a museum in Venice, Italy. Shadowsan's brother, Hideo, is also there, having lent Japanese artifacts. Chase is partnered with Agent Zari, due to the Chief's growing frustration at his lack of capturing Carmen or a V.I.L.E. agent, and they inform museum security of "Carmen's" incoming theft. Mime Bomb and Neal the Eel are sent to commit the theft, forcing Shadowsan to meet his brother and explain that he and Carmen are hiding the artifacts from the real thieves. After duping the V.I.L.E. goons into taking fake masks during a boat chase, Carmen is caught by Chase; however, he is surprised that she hands over the real ones, making him realize Julia was right all along. Shadowsan makes amends with his brother, who tells him that he will be welcomed home once his fight against V.I.L.E. is over. Meanwhile, as Neal and Mime Bomb realize they've been tricked, Mime Bomb tries to warn Neal of incoming police, but he is misunderstood and instead dives into the water, leaving Neal to be arrested. At V.I.L.E. Castle, Roundabout reassures the rest of the V.I.L.E. Faculty that Neal the Eel will be released and that an elaborate trap will be set for Carmen Sandiego that she will not be able to resist.
24	5	"The Jolly Good Show Caper"	Jos Humphrey	Greg Ernstrom	October 1, 2020
In London, Carmen and her crew break into the Tower of London to stop V.I.L.E. from nabbing the Crown Jewels of England. Roundabout and The Troll trick her into starting the theft, getting her caught by the authorities, while Roundabout switches St. Edward's Crown with a replica and hands it off to Le Chèvre to take back to V.I.L.E. at Big Ben, only later to be confronted by Shadowsan. Roundabout follows and fights Shadowsan to the top of the clocktower, where the police arrive via helicopter and order Roundabout to surrender for the theft of the crown. Shadowsan then slips to the shadows while revealing the team's true plan: Player tricked The Troll and forwarded footage of the theft to the police, while Zack and Ivy posed as the officers taking away Carmen, allowing her to take back the real crown from Le Chèvre and placing it in Roundabout's office, thus pinning the crime on him. Defeated, Roundabout accepts arrest, only to be freed by the Cleaners to be taken to V.I.L.E. in Scotland. Meanwhile, at A.C.M.E., Chief, having finally run out of leads and patience to catch Carmen and stopping V.I.L.E., decides to bring in Graham, the only link to Carmen left exposed.

=== Season 4 (2021) ===
No. overall	No. in season	Title	Directed by	Written by	Original release date
25	1	"The Beijing Bullion Caper"	Mike West	Becky Tinker	January 15, 2021
Graham is with a touring opera in Reykjavík when A.C.M.E. agents take him in for questioning. Meanwhile, Roundabout and Neal are given second chances after Dr. Bellum's mindwipe device malfunctions. They plan on kidnapping Huang Li, manager of the gold bullion in China's largest bank. Their initial kidnapping attempt in the Forbidden City is thwarted by Team Red, so they try again during the Peking opera, where Huang Li is performing with his daughter, Xifeng. Lady Dokuso incapacitates Huang Li, while Mime Bomb takes his place onstage; Xifeng and Carmen immediately detect Mind Bomb's presence. Player hacks into Beijing's traffic system to momentarily stop Neal driving Huang Li to the bank, allowing Zack, disguised in Huang Li's costume, to switch places with him. When Neal arrives at the bank, Zack escapes. Huang Li is rushed back for his performance, while Xifeng takes down Mime Bomb. Shadowsan fights with Dokuso on the roof, but falls, breaking his leg. With V.I.L.E.'s caper failed, Roundabout is taken to the dungeons, while Neal escapes. Meanwhile, Chief interrogates Graham, but he is unable to remember anything. When Chase recognizes Graham from the train in Paris, Chief sends him in to interrogate Graham further.
26	2	"The Big Bad Ivy Caper"	Jos Humphery	Kathryn Lyn	January 15, 2021
Dr. Bellum proposes using robot operatives for V.I.L.E. heists. Cleo sends Dash Haber to meet with Madam Goldlove to smuggle gold out of Bavaria. Carmen and Ivy go to Bavaria alone, since Shadowsan is recovering from his leg injury, and Zack stays at HQ to keep him company. Player cannot help, since his parents are sending him to public school. Ivy sees Dash Haber and pretends to be Madam Goldlove, while the real Goldlove is lured away by Carmen, pretending to be Haber. Haber and Ivy enter the factory where V.I.L.E. plans to smuggle gold by forming it into gnome figurines and pouring chocolate over them to appear as confectioneries. Carmen sneaks into the factory but is taken captive by Goldlove, with Ivy's cover being blown. Carmen and Ivy fight with Goldlove and V.I.L.E. until the police arrive, prompting V.I.L.E. to flee. Meanwhile, Chase and Chief still question Graham, but he cannot give any answers. A.C.M.E. uses an experimental device to rejuvenate Graham's memories. With Graham's memories of V.I.L.E briefly restored, he escapes and calls V.I.L.E. The V.I.L.E. faculty questions how Crackle can be back, but decide to answer the call.
27	3	"The Robo Caper"	Mike West	Carly Denure	January 15, 2021
Dr. Bellum sends her completed robot operative, Roby the Robo-Robber, to steal a golden crown from a new science museum in Singapore. Without Player's help, Carmen and Ivy fail to stop it. However, they are able to get Roby's arm after it is run over by Ivy, and they bring it back to headquarters for analyzing. Meanwhile, Graham is stuck in a fugue state due to his confused memories, so Maelstrom tells him to wait for someone to pick him up after calling V.I.L.E. for help during his delirium. He is later arrested for stealing due to his flickering thief persona. Carmen, Zack and Ivy catch wind of Graham's trouble and head to Reykjavik to save him, running into Chase, who was sent by Chief to bring Graham in. Carmen locks Chase in the police station's interrogation room, despite him saying that he wants to help, rather than wanting to arrest her. Carmen fails to rescue Graham, and he is taken away to Bellum by the Cleaners and Roby. During all this, Shadowsan, still recovering at HQ, fends for himself against Roby's reactivated arm.
28	4	"The Himalayan Rescue Caper"	Jos Humphrey	Greg Ernstrom	January 15, 2021
Chief, who is disappointed about Graham and Carmen escaping, tells Chase to get his priorities with Carmen straight. Feeling unsure, he goes to see Julia, who is now a university professor of history at Oxford. However, when he tries to get help understanding Carmen, she rebuffs him with a meeting for lunch next Friday. Graham is brought to Dr. Bellum's lab in the Himalayas, where Maelstrom begins working to fully jog Graham's memory. After some resistance and confusion, Graham remembers and decides to continue as a V.I.L.E. operative. Carmen tracks Graham to Bellum's lab, but Player is unable to assist while at school. Zack and Ivy, pretending to be fumigators, get the school to be evacuated, allowing Player to assist. Infiltrating the lab, Carmen discovers a whole army of V.I.L.E. robots. She encounters Graham, who asserts himself as a V.I.L.E. operative, but is hesitant toward fighting Carmen and pleads with her to stop trying to defeat V.I.L.E. as he regretted hurting her before and doesn't want and have to be put in the same situation again to do so. Carmen rejects him and sets off an explosive, destroying most of Bellum's facility and all the robots. She escapes with the stolen crown, evading Bellum and Roby, who is destroyed at the base of a cliff. Carmen meets face to face with Player, who explains that his parents are pulling him out of public school due to fears of the "infestation". Meanwhile, in Nevşehir, Turkey, archaeologists explore a cavern exposed by recent earthquakes, finding a V symbol.
29	5	"The V.I.L.E. History Caper"	Mike West	Story by : Greg Ernstrom & Kathryn Lyn; Teleplay by : Greg Ernstrom	January 15, 2021
A livestreamed excavation of the newly discovered cavern in Nevşehir reveals footage of a V symbol relic on a wall. This symbol represented V.I.L.E. in its early history, which was kept only to the V.I.L.E. faculty. Long ago, there were 5 founders who used the symbol to represent them and had grown their operation with so much wealth that they had to hide it in a vault; eventually they created 3 relic clues in 3 places for V.I.L.E.'s descendants to find them and use to locate the treasures but they were lost to history. Carmen heads to retrieve the relic in the cavern but it's taken by El Topo. Giving chase, Carmen pursues him and Le Chèvre onto a massive floating balloon, among a balloon festival in the neighboring town. The pair take a selfie with the symbol but lose it after Carmen steals it out of their hands. The image is identified by Maelstrom as related to Svalbard in Norway and was the faux burial ground of Gunnhild the Gruesome, one of the earliest founders of V.I.L.E. Carmen heads to Oxford to ask Julia for help and tells the necessary information from the clue; it leads to a Viking ship buried underground in Longyearbyen. The ship is hidden in an icy cavern and upon entering, the team is split by falling ice. Zack and Ivy reach the ship, where they snag the eye patch hiding and containing the second clue in the ship's head. Maelstrom and Coach Brunt enter and prepare to fight, but Carmen and Shadowsan intervene. Maelstrom takes the relic and leaves, followed by the team, while Shadowsan fights Brunt. Their fighting causes instability in the cavern and the surrounding ice sheet to collapse. Everyone makes it out in time, Maelstrom is in a taxi cab when he see Brunt tired on the road. Maelstrom takes control of the car and drives himself and Brunt back home. Team Red realize the cloth from the eyepatch has the imprints of the 2nd clue from the relic and go to Julia again to translate the information.
30	6	"The Egyptian Decryption Caper"	Jos Humphrey	Carly Denure, Nicole Belisle & Sharon Flynn	January 15, 2021
After Carmen steals the final map relic in India, an angry Dr. Bellum and Cleo use surveillance of Carmen to track Julia down. With the help of Tigress and the Cleaners, Cleo kidnaps her and takes Julia to Egypt to find the vault in the Great Pyramid of Giza. Carmen calls in Chase, who had taking her call to Julia at the university when he arrived for their lunch meeting, for help rescuing Julia. He then, once the treasure has been found, call in Chief to send the police in to recover the treasure. Escaping capture and enraged beyond reason, Cleo tells the Faculty they must make Carmen pay severely. Meanwhile, digging into Carmen's bank trip in Argentina, Chief slowly discovers a connection between her and Dexter Wolfe and later accepts Carmen has been helping take down V.I.L.E. the entire time and gets Julia to set up a meeting with her through the means of a cryptic blog post for Player to track. Back in the coffee shop in Seattle, Carmen meets with Chief and shows her the picture she took from the bank, revealing that she is the long lost daughter of Dexter Wolfe and asks Chief to find her mother, in exchange for all the intel she has on V.I.L.E. Afterwards in a park, The Cleaners kidnap Carmen, taking her back to V.I.L.E. Castle.
31	7	"The Viennese Waltz Caper"	Mike West	Sharon Flynn & Duane Capizzi	January 15, 2021
Following the abduction and during the three weeks of trying to find clues to V.I.L.E.'s new location, Julia rejoins A.C.M.E. as Chief assigns her to find Carmen's mom and Player finds a new lead about an upcoming scheme. Shadowsan, Zack, Ivy and A.C.M.E. fly to Vienna to intercept V.I.L.E.'s latest heist, hoping it'll lead them to the missing Carmen, unaware that the Faculty have successfully brainwashed Carmen into becoming a loyal V.I.L.E. operative who is a pure evil version of herself and now works with her old classmates, who have been trained to keep the new Carmen in check, to quickly rebuild their funds. Later, after finally confronting her and realizing Carmen has turned bad, Team Red ponders how to get Carmen back and A.C.M.E. is reluctantly forced to take Carmen down for good. After six months of successful yet ever boundary pushing schemes, the brainwashed Carmen has earned the faculty's favor and she is brought to V.I.L.E. Castle to be added into V.I.L.E.'s faculty who tell her that her father used to reside in the very same seat she now occupies, until Shadowsan stole his life and now seeks revenge against him.
32	8	"The Dark Red Caper"	Jos Humphrey	Duane Capizzi	January 15, 2021
The brainwashed Carmen has earned and accepted the faculty's seat and declares V.I.L.E. her family. Chief and Julia find and track down Carmen's mother who runs an orphanage, which she started initially in the hopes of finding her lost daughter. While A.C.M.E. keeps an eye on the orphanage, Shadowsan infiltrates and finds several pictures of Dexter Wolfe and the final Russian nesting doll missing from Carmen's collection. Graham asks for A.C.M.E.'s help to restore Carmen's memories as he wants Carmen back in charge of her own fate. Together, A.C.M.E. and Graham decide to trick V.I.L.E. into sending Carmen after the same treasure that she helped recover from her first trip in Poitiers; the diamond from the Morocco heist. During an intense struggle with Chase, Julia, Graham and Shadowsan, Carmen is zapped with the memory restorer and returns to her senses after Shadowsan shows her the last doll. Carmen gives Chief V.I.L.E.'s location, leading to the arrest of Brunt, Bellum, Cleo, Roundabout, Maelstrom, Tigress and Mime Bomb. While El Topo and Le Chèvre open and run a food truck, the rest of V.I.L.E. remains at large. Shadowsan returns home to his brother, while Carmen finally meets her mother and Graham is rewarded with being let go by A.C.M.E. after he recovers in the hospital. Two years later, Zack and Ivy are now A.C.M.E. agents paired with Chase and Julia. They track Paper Star down to a museum, only to find her tied up. They catch sight of Carmen on the roof, happy to see her again, before she takes off for parts and to places unknown.

== Production ==
On April 14, 2017, Hollywood insider information site The Tracking Board reported that they had exclusively learned of an animated Carmen Sandiego project at Netflix, with Gina Rodriguez as the voice of the titular character. The site reported that the 20-episode series would aim to be "as educational as it is entertaining", in keeping with the style of the franchise. It was later confirmed that the series would be called Carmen Sandiego. Rodriguez confirmed the story via her Twitter feed the following day in response to a Hypable story, which compared the news to that of a Kate McKinnon-led revival of The Magic School Bus. Carmen Sandiego was set to appeal to a wider audience (ages 6–11), plus the parents of those kids and fans of the original series. On April 18 and 19, the news began to be published by reputable news sites, where it was confirmed that Netflix had rebooted the franchise on TV by ordering twenty 22-minute episodes of Carmen Sandiego, which would premiere in 2019 and with Gina Rodriguez in the starring role. Rotoscopers noted that this was "more than most Netflix Originals receive". The Hollywood Reporter noted that Rita Moreno, who voiced Carmen in the FOX animated series Where on Earth Is Carmen Sandiego?, had recently guest-starred on Rodriguez's show Jane the Virgin. The new series was described as having "thrilling adventure and intrigue", while offering an "intimate look into Carmen's past" and what inspired her career choices, essentially answering the question "Who in the world is Carmen Sandiego?" while simultaneously following her on her thieving escapades.

Promotional material for the series

Caroline Fraser, Head of HMH Productions, is the Executive Producer of the series. Duane Capizzi, known for Transformers: Prime and The Batman, is the showrunner and Co-Executive Producer. Kevin Dart serves as visual designer. It is a production by DHX Media, providing production work, and Chromosphere, providing the design work. Animation services are outsourced to Top Draw Animation in the Philippines. DHX/WildBrain Media is the current owner of the library of DIC Entertainment, the animation studio which produced the Earth animated series. The series is produced by Houghton Mifflin Harcourt, who own the rights to the franchise after their corporate predecessor Riverdeep acquired the property in 2002. The Hollywood Reporter wrote that the series followed in the wake of Bill Nye Saves the World and Julie's Greenroom. Finn Wolfhard signed on to lend his voice to the character Player, who is described as Carmen's chief accomplice and friend. Another character called "Player" was featured in Where on Earth Is Carmen Sandiego?, but this character was a fourth wall-breaking live action boy who bookended the show and interacted with Carmen, implied to be the player of a video game featuring her. E! Online reported that the new series would be called, simply, "Carmen Sandiego".

Rodriguez, who had first learned about the series through the PBS game show Where in the World Is Carmen Sandiego?, asserted that the new Carmen Sandiego origin series was "tight", "well written", "really, really good", and "unbelievable". She mentioned that Netflix was a home for great programming and that the show had partnered with talented illustrators. She added that despite being entertaining, the show would still provide geographic and historical education. In another interview, she said that she loved the art and story of the animated series, and praised the show's executive producer, Duane Capizzi, for making the world that Carmen inhabits in the show itself.

Andy Yeatman, Netflix director of global kids content, explained "We think there's a huge benefit of having a program that parents remember fondly and grew up with. We are giving them the opportunity to introduce it to their kids and spark a conversation", explaining that while the service pitched reboots of many '80s and '90s shows, Carmen Sandiego was one that "made sense" and "really stood out". They responded to the fact that this is not a show that is perennially rebooted, as the last Carmen Sandiego series ended 20 years before this new series would premiere, and that there are interesting ways to retell the story. In addition to Yeatman's comments, Amy Dunkin, Houghton Mifflin's the chief marketing officer, noted that many had "fond memories" of Carmen Sandiego, and added that there are many ways "you can go with Carmen just based on what she stands for."

In March 2018, Netflix also ordered a live-action film of Carmen Sandiego, once again with Rodriguez as the titular character.

Of the initial 20-episode order, nine episodes were released as the show's first season. On February 15, 2019, Netflix announced the second season, made up of a further ten.

On April 24, 2020, Netflix announced a third season, followed on October 2, 2020, with announcement of a fourth, which was later announced to be the final season.

In September and October 2021, the official Twitter account for the show confirmed that a spin-off of the series was in the "earliest stages" and that they would share details on the spinoff as soon as they could.

== International broadcast ==
After the end of the show, it has been syndicated across countries. In France, it airs on Disney Channel since August 29, 2022. In Switzerland, it airs on RTS 1 since August 27, 2022. In Japan, it also airs on Disney Channel. In Canada, it airs on Family Channel since 2023 and WildBrainTV from November 5, 2022 to the channel's closure on October 23, 2025.

== Reception ==
=== Pre-release ===
The announcement saw a positive response by the media, who appreciated the throwback, and a return for the Carmen Sandiego franchise to the small screen. TVShowsOnDVD wrote "It's awesome to see this franchise return to television". The Rolling Stone thought the TV series' origin story subject matter offers what was once one of "golden age of television's favorite thematic trappings". Commenting "children of the 90's rejoice", Maxim suggested that Netflix enlist the talents of World game show theme song performers Rockapella to provide music for the show. ScreenRant noted that "those who still hold fond memories of the property" would be intrigued as to what type of shape the new series will take; adding that it has a "storied legacy" to live up to and will likely take some inspiration from Earth. Dark Horizons expressed sadness that the show was two years away. Toonzone wondered if the new show would maintain the established backstory of the red fedora-wearing villain, which in mid-to-late '90s canon involved Carmen Sandiego beginning as an A.C.M.E. agent before finding the work too easy so wanting to outsmart her former colleagues. Gizmodo thought the new series would "bring the character's trademark blend of edutainment to new audiences". Mashable said "fans demanding the series NOW". Pedestrian thought the trend toward series such as this was a sign that producers were aiming to " trap people in a downwards vortex of nostalgia ". Fortune suggested that the new show offered Netflix "huge merchandizing potential", and that the company could follow in the footsteps of Disney by creating a merchandising arm to support its shows. Rom-Game saw this as a sign that Netflix was "indirectly interested in gaming heritage". MiscRave mentioned how much potential the franchise with its interactive edutainment in a compelling package it previously had. NerdHQ noted that the new series offered an opportunity to resuscitate the "once-dormant" and "dying" franchise. Apart from these media reviews, various Latina women across the United States were excited and energized by the show's release.

=== Post-release ===
The show currently holds a 95% approval rating on Rotten Tomatoes, based on 14 reviews, with the site's consensus reading, "Vivid animation and creative reconstruction of the Carmen Sandiego backstory elevates this property beyond its edutainment roots."

Megan Summers of Screen Rant highlighted Wolfhard's role as Player, calling it one of his best roles, and Prabhdeep Dhaliwal in The Peak stated that while the show is "geared towards a younger demographic," adults can still be entertained by it. He also stated that the show has sympathetic characters and an "overarching theme of good winning over evil."

Other reviewers are more critical. Renaldo Matadeen of CBR, for instance, critically reviewed the series. He argued that the second season ended on a "very intense note," while noting the family history themes in the show, and stated that the final episode of the third season remixes all the movies of the Ocean's franchise. Additionally, Katherine Smith of Paste felt that Carmen Sandiego had returned to relevance with the Netflix series, but also highlighted how animated projects "hustle their employees out of sight," contrasting the gains in visible representation with "very plausible worker exploitation." She cited an example of Filipino company, Top Draw (working on the animation), which fired a whistleblower who demanded proper compensation. She concluded by saying that in the current series, Carmen Sandiego is a female thief who "steals only from thieves now," and worried about where her character had gone when compared to the original story. On the other hand, Emily Ashby of Common Sense Media described the series as "action-packed" and argued that the series "incorporates solid geographical and cultural information" into the story in "creative ways."

In a review of all the episodes of the third season, Matadeen wrote that there is a "lot packed in" the third season, predicting the revenge of the villainous Roundabout, saving Gray, a face-off between The Chief and Carmen, and the continued search for Carmen's mom in the show's next season. At the same time, Martha Sorren of Bust also predicted that the fourth season could explore the relationship between Carmen and her mother.

=== Awards and nominations ===
Year	Award	Category	Nominee(s)	Result
2019	71st Primetime Creative Arts Emmy Awards	Outstanding Children's Program	Caroline Fraser, C.J. Kettler, Kirsten Newlands, Anne Loi, Duane Capizzi and Brian Hulme	Nominated
2019	71st Primetime Creative Arts Emmy Awards	Outstanding Individual Achievement in Animation	Elaine Lee (as background painter for "The Chasing Paper Caper")	Won
2020	47th Annie Awards	Best Character Design — TV/Media	Keiko Murayama (for "The Chasing Paper Caper")	Won
2020	47th Annie Awards	Best Music — TV/Media	Jared Lee Gosselin, Steve D'Angelo and Lorenzo Castelli (for "The Chasing Paper Caper")	Nominated
2020	47th Annie Awards	Best Production Design — TV/Media	Eastwood Wong, Sylvia Liu, Elaine Lee, Linda Fong and Emily Paik (for "Becoming Carmen Sandiego")	Nominated
2020	47th Annie Awards	Best Storyboarding — TV/Media	Kenny Park (for "Becoming Carmen Sandiego")	Won
2020	47th Daytime Creative Arts Emmy Awards	Outstanding Special Class Animated Program	Caroline Fraser, C.J. Kettler, Kirsten Newlands, Anne Loi, Duane Capizzi and Brian Hulme	Nominated
2020	47th Daytime Creative Arts Emmy Awards	Outstanding Directing for an Animated Program	Jos Humphrey, Kenny Park, Mike West, Flávia Guttler and Jamie Simone	Nominated
2020	47th Daytime Creative Arts Emmy Awards	Outstanding Casting for an Animated Series or Special	Jamie Simone and Sierra Leoni	Nominated
2020	47th Daytime Creative Arts Emmy Awards	Outstanding Individual Achievement in Animation	Wei Li and Sylvia Liu	Won
2020	36th TCA Awards	Outstanding Achievement in Youth Programming	Carmen Sandiego	Nominated
2021	32nd Producers Guild of America Awards	Outstanding Children's Program	Carmen Sandiego	Nominated
2022	49th Annie Awards	Best TV/Media — Children	"The Himalayan Rescue Caper"	Nominated
