= Where in the World Is Carmen Sandiego? Junior Detective Edition =

1995 video game

Carmen Sandiego: Junior Detective
- Box cover
- Developer: Broderbund
- Publisher: Selectsoft Publishing
- Series: Carmen Sandiego
- Platforms: Windows; Mac OS
- Release: US: March 1, 1995
- Genre: Educational
- Mode: Single-player

Carmen Sandiego: Junior Detective (sometimes referred to as Carmen Sandiego: Junior Detective Edition, Junior Detective Edition, or Where in the World is Carmen Sandiego: Junior Detective Edition) is a 1995 education game in the Carmen Sandiego franchise developed by Broderbund. Although not a version of Where in the World Is Carmen Sandiego? by name, it is essentially a simplified version of it for pre-readers. Allgame says the game "is geared for younger users, with only 14 cases to solve". The lead characters of the FOX animated series Where on Earth Is Carmen Sandiego?, Zack and Ivy, were included in the game, along with Stretch - "ACME's crime-tracking dog".

== Production notes ==
Although Zack, Ivy, the Chief and Carmen Sandiego seem to have the same voice actors as in Earth, Carmen's appearance is different from in the show. Aside from including these characters and the fact that the user is addressed as "Player", the game has little to do with the Earth show.

ACME's Stretch the Crime Dog and Stretch's nemesis Carmine, Carmen Sandiego's pet cat, are introduced in this game. According to the game manual, Stretch captured so many V.I.L.E. agents as a puppy that ACME gave him "The Golden Snout Award", its highest K-9 honor. Stretch later appeared in one episode ("The Remnants") of the Earth series.

=== Geographical errors ===
Notably, this is the first post-Cold War version of the World game, meaning it is the first to feature Russia instead of the Soviet Union. However, the map of Asia used in the game inaccurately shows Sakhalin to be under the dominion of Japan. In actuality, the island is under the control of Russia, as it was at the time this game was produced.

== Gameplay ==
The game is played on a device called the GizmoTapper 586-LC which includes DeeJay, an artificial intelligence who guides the user through the game. Each country visited consists of a stock photograph inserted in the GizmoTapper's monitor. The user moves the cursor over the monitor, where it turns into a magnifying glass and glows to indicate the user has found a clue. Presented to the user by Zack, Ivy or DeeJay, each clue is a simple icon that represents a characteristic of the destination country's culture or economy (e.g. coffee, cathedrals, snakes, gold). The user must match the icon to the icons on a map to determine where the crook went. As the game progresses, more and more icons are needed to determine the target location. After the final photographs have been taken and the wanted poster assembled, the user is presented to a final country, where he or she must simply find a single clue. Once a clue is found, the chase begins (see The Warrant and the Arrest) Instead of the "time limit" used in previous games, there is a "fuel limit" — that is, the arrest must be made before the GizmoTapper runs out of power (which is expended by traveling between countries, finding clues, and assembling the wanted poster). Another change is that each location is identified by the name of the country rather than the name of a city within that country.

A simplified version of the "warrant" function is also included. At each location, a bumbling photographer attempts to take a picture of the crook, but only gets a portion of the criminal's portrait. One or two pieces of the crook's picture are captured in each destination. The user must place these pieces together in a wanted poster located in the bottom right corner of the GizmoTapper. Failure to do this will result in the culprit escaping at the end of the case. As the game progresses, the wanted poster will have more pieces to it, making it increasingly difficult to assemble. The user is not required to answer questions in order to be promoted.

== Critical reception ==
Reception

Review score
Publication	Score
PC Player	70%

Awards
Publication	Award
Codie award	1995 Best Early Education Program
Newsweek	1996 Editor's Choice Award
Family PC	Family Tested Recommended Award

The German PC Player gave the game a score of 70 out of 100.

Lisa Karen Savignano of Allgame gave the game a rating of 4 stars out of 5, which is broken down into 4 stars for graphics, 4 stars for sound, 4 stars for enjoyment, 3 stars for replay value, and 4 stars for documentation.

The game received the 1995 Codie award for Best Early Education Program.
