= Where on Earth Is Carmen Sandiego? =

American animated television series (1994–1999)

- Genre: Action-adventure; Comedy; Edutainment
- Developed by: Sean Roche
- Directed by: Joe Barruso (seasons 1–3); Stan Phillips (season 4)
- Voices of: Rita Moreno; Jennifer Hale; Scott Menville; Rodger Bumpass
- Composer: Tom Worrall
- Country of origin: United States
- Original language: English
- No. of seasons: 4
- No. of episodes: 40 (list of episodes)

Production
- Executive producers: Andy Heyward; Robby London; Michael Maliani; Benjamin Melniker; Michael E. Uslan
- Producers: Michael Maliani (seasons 1–2); Joe Barruso (seasons 2–3); Stan Phillips (season 4)
- Editor: Miriam L. Preissel
- Running time: 30 minutes (with commercials)
- Production company: DIC Productions, L.P.

Original release
- Network: Fox (Fox Kids) (1994–1998); Fox Family Channel (1998–1999)
- Release: February 5, 1994 – January 2, 1999

Related
- Where in the World Is Carmen Sandiego?; Where in Time Is Carmen Sandiego?; Carmen Sandiego (Netflix series)

Where on Earth Is Carmen Sandiego? is an American live action/animated television series based on the series of computer games. The show was produced by DIC Productions, L.P. and originally aired from February 5, 1994 to January 2, 1999, on Saturday mornings during FOX's Fox Kids Network block. Reruns aired on the Qubo television network from June 9, 2012 (alongside Animal Atlas) to May 26, 2018.

The series won a Daytime Emmy Award for Outstanding Children's Animated Program in 1995, and in the same year was spun-off into a Where in the World-styled video game entitled Carmen Sandiego: Junior Detective. Its theme song uses the melody from the chorus "Singt dem großen Bassa Lieder" ("Sing Songs of the Great Pasha") from Mozart's opera Die Entführung aus dem Serail (The Abduction from the Seraglio).

== Plot ==
Following the plot of the Carmen Sandiego franchise, Earth sees international thief Carmen Sandiego (voiced by Rita Moreno) lead the organization V.I.L.E. in stealing treasures from around the world and leaving clues behind for ACME agents Zack (voiced by Scott Menville) and Ivy (voiced by Jennifer Hale), under the guidance of the Chief (voiced by Rodger Bumpass), to find and capture her. In this version, Carmen Sandiego was a former agent of ACME who left to seek a greater challenge, and has a strong code of ethics when stealing items and why she went rogue. The Player is an unseen live-action character who bookends acts by communicating with Carmen; it is implied that the television series is a video game that they are playing from a computer. Mostly the recurring bit in the series, Zack and Ivy find Carmen towards the end of the episode, but she escapes before they can capture her. They, however, retrieve the stolen items and her henchmen are usually captured.

While Carmen is originally presented as the show's titular antagonist, she becomes more of an anti-hero as the series progresses; she even helps Zack and Ivy fight against mutual enemies.

== Characters ==
=== Main characters ===
- Carmen Sandiego (voiced by Rita Moreno) is an international thief and the head of V.I.L.E. Despite the name of her organization, she has a strong code of morals and only steals for the challenge of it. She was a former agent of the ACME Detective Agency.
- Chief (voiced by Rodger Bumpass) is the head of ACME. Short for Computerized Holographic Imaging Educational Facilitator, his role consisted of providing exposition, information, alerts of Carmen's recent crime, and comic relief. He had a very intimate professional and personal relationship with Carmen before she turned coat. He once also had a robotic body while working with Carmen back when she was still part of the ACME Detective Agency.
- Ivy (voiced by Jennifer Hale) is an 18-year-old woman who has short red hair and green eyes. She and Carmen seem to have a past history, although it is only hinted at in the series. Her skills include having multiple black belts in martial arts and being an expert pilot. She can get frustrated easily, such as hating it when Zack calls her "sis" (even though she often calls him "little bro") or when Carmen is getting away.
- Zack (voiced by Scott Menville) is Ivy's 14-year-old brother, who has blond hair and blue eyes. He speaks multiple languages and knows cultures from all over the world and he is also highly intelligent. He takes cases less seriously than his sister Ivy. Zack's jacket has his name misspelled as Zak. Mostly he is a lazy slacker and quite arrogant.
- Player (portrayed by Jeffrey Tucker in season 1, Justin Shenkarow in season 2, Asi Lang and Joanie Pleasant in seasons 3–4) is the only live-action character on the program, always seen from behind as a computer user at the beginning and ending of the show. They are the ones who transport Zack and Ivy to their locations and summon ACME detectives to their aid.

=== ACME detectives ===
The following are ACME detectives who assist Zack and Ivy:

- Aileen (voiced by Janice Kawaye) is a Hawaiian detective. Her older brother Max is a TV news reporter where they appear in "Curses, Foiled Again".
- Amati is a Black detective and archaeologist who appears in "A Higher Calling" and "Follow My Footprints".
- Armando Arguella is an Argentinian detective and gaucho who appears in "The Good Old Bad Old Days", "Scavenger Hunt", "Just Like Old Times", and "Can You Ever Go Home Again?" Part 2.
- Billy Running Bird is a Native American detective who appears in "Shaman Spirits".
- Chester is a young American detective and amateur ornithologist who appears in "Birds of a Feather".
- Gro (voiced by Chadwick Pelletier) is a Norwegian detective and friend of Zack who appears in "Retribution" Pt. 2.
- Jasmine is a Jamaican detective who appears in "Skull and Double-Crossbones".
- Josha is an American detective and computer expert who appears in "Retribution" Pt. 3, "The Trial of Carmen Sandiego", "Cupid Sandiego", and "Can You Ever Go Home Again?" Pt. 1. He has a crush on, and later dates, Ivy.
- Ketut is an Indonesian detective from Bali who enjoys hang-gliding and appears in "Hot Ice".
- Li is a detective from Macao who appears in "Skull and Double-Crossbones" and "Can You Ever Go Home Again?" Pt. 2.
- Maria (voiced by Kath Soucie) is a Brazilian detective from ACME's Rio de Janeiro office who seems to have a crush on Zack. She appears in "Music to My Ears".
- Marco is an Italian detective and friend of Ivy who appears in "Split Up".
- Michelle is a young African American Space Camp Florida participant in "Moondreams" and later becomes an ACME detective in "Follow My Footprints".
- Reggis and Barrow are a team of Black/White British detectives who appear in "Just Like Old Times".
- Tatiana (voiced by Candi Milo) is a Russian ACME detective whom Zack has a crush on as seen in "Scavenger Hunt" and "Can You Ever Go Home Again?" Pt. 2.
- Wahidullah is an Afghan detective who appears in "Birds of a Feather".

=== V.I.L.E. agents ===
The following are agents who work for Carmen Sandiego's organization, V.I.L.E.:

- Abe L. Body is a V.I.L.E. agent and an athlete who is a team player to V.I.L.E. and likes to steal items from the Olympics and any other sports. He was mentioned in "Follow My Footprints" to have been arrested by authorities for trying to steal some volcanic ashes as a possible answer to one of the clues in the contest about who would succeed Carmen Sandiego after her supposed death. His name is a play on "able body".
- Al Loy is a hotheaded American metallurgist who appears in "A Date with Carmen" Pts. 1 & 2, and "All for One". His name is a play on "alloy".
- Archie Ology is a white American archaeologist who appears in "Follow My Footprints" and "The Trial of Carmen Sandiego". His name is a play on "archaeology".
- Auntie Bellum is a white American agent from the South who appears in "Timing Is Everything". Her name is a play on "Antebellum".
- Buck N. Bronco is a white American agent from the West who appears in "The Good Old Bad Old Days". His name is a play on "bucking bronco".
- Clair E. Net and Cora Net (both voiced by Kath Soucie) are a white American twin sister musicians: Clair is a singer, while Cora is a pianist and electric guitarist. They were once "busted in a lip-synching scandal" as mentioned by the Chief when they appeared in "Music to My Ears". Their names are plays on "clarinet" and "cornet".
- Clay Tandoori is an Indian agent who appears in "Dinosaur Delirium" and "Labyrinth" Pt. 1. His name is a reference to tandoors, traditionally made of clay.
- Dara Riska is an equally hotheaded white American agent and rival of Al Loy who appears in "All for One". Her name is apparently a play on "dare a risk".
- Dee Tritus is a white American gemologist who appears in "Hot Ice". Her name is a play on "detritus".
- Four Chin Hunter is an Asian American treasure hunter who appears in "A Higher Calling" and "A Date with Carmen" Pt. 1. His name is a play on "fortune hunter".
- Frank M. Poster is a white British master of disguise who appears in "By a Whisker" and "Birds of a Feather". His name is a play on "frank impostor".
- Hannah Lulu is a superstitious Hawaiian agent who appears in "Curses, Foiled Again". She was later mentioned in "Can You Ever Go Home Again?" Pt. 2. Her name is a play on "Honolulu".
- Lars Vegas is a greedy, vain white American agent who appears in "Follow My Footprints", "Just Like Old Times" and "Cupid Sandiego". His name is a play on "Las Vegas".
- Lee Galese is Carmen Sandiego's lawyer who acts as executor of her estate in "Follow My Footprints" and as her defense attorney in "The Trial of Carmen Sandiego". His name is a play on "legalese".
- Manny Mistakes is an absent-minded computer technician who appears in "Just Like Old Times". His name is a play on "many mistakes", though his last name is never spoken in the episode.
- Moe Skeeter is a bumbling white American agent who always appears with Lars Vegas in "Follow My Footprints", "Just Like Old Times" and "Cupid Sandiego". His name is a play on "mosquito".
- Paige Turner is a white American literature expert who appears in "Chapter and Verse". Her name is a play on "page-turner".
- Pearl Diver is an American underwater diver who appears in "A Date with Carmen" Pts. 1 & 2.
- Pop A. Wheelie and Iggy Nition are a team of white American agents and motorcyclists who appear in "The Remnants". Their names are plays on "pop a wheelie" and "ignition".
- R.B. Traitor is ostensibly a judge turned criminal who hunts crooks down and sentences them to a secret jail while stealing their loot, but he is in fact a V.I.L.E. agent who assists Carmen by using Zack and Ivy to lead her past security measures to her desired loot, an original copy of the Magna Carta as seen in "The Trial of Carmen Sandiego". His name is a play on "arbitrator".
- Rip Shipoff is a white pirate who has a pet parrot who appears in "Skull and Double-Crossbones". His name seems to mean "rip off a ship".
- Stu L. Pijin is a bird trainer who appears in "Birds of a Feather". His name is a play on "stool pigeon".
- Touriste Classé is a French "international con man and master art thief" who appears in "The Stolen Smile" and "Labyrinth" Pt. 1. His name is a play on "tourist class".
- An unnamed pair of agents, one man and one woman, are presumably Chinese, whose hideout is a junk on the Yangtze River. Each has a tattoo of half of a yin and yang symbol, and the man has a pet cormorant. They only appear in "Moondreams".
- A substantial number of unnamed henchmen who work for Carmen Sandiego and other V.I.L.E. agents, they wear head-to-toe blue outfits with goggles and boots and appear in most episodes.

=== Other villains ===
As Carmen Sandiego became less villainous and evolved into more of an antihero, other characters began to fill her original role as the show's antagonist. The following villains are:

- Dr. Sara Bellum is Carmen Sandiego's former robotics and computer expert who appears in "Split Up" and "Chapter and Verse". She betrays V.I.L.E., impersonating Carmen in an attempt to become known as the world's greatest thief in "When It Rains", but later appears to be a V.I.L.E. member again in "Follow My Footprints" where she competes to become Carmen's successor following her apparent death. Her name is a play on "cerebellum".
  - Ira Gation (voiced by Michael Earl) is Sara's sole henchperson during her time away from V.I.L.E. who appears in "When It Rains". His name is a play on "irrigation".
- Dr. Gunnar Maelstrom (voiced by Tim Curry) is a hostile and extremely violent criminal who considers Carmen Sandiego his archenemy and appears in the three part "Retribution" episodes. As an ACME detective, Carmen pursued him and eventually put him in prison following his attempt to steal the wreck of the Titanic. Years later, following his escape from prison and apparent death, Carmen had come to consider him a rolemodel, but his escape was in fact part of a plot for revenge on her. His last name is a reference to maelstroms, a term for powerful oceanic whirlpools.
  - Bilge is Maelstrom's lead henchman who appears in "Retribution" Pts. 1–3.
- Mason Dixon is a V.I.L.E. agent and avowed Southerner who resents Carmen's success and appears in "Timing Is Everything". In 1989, the two were partners in an art theft in Amsterdam, but Mason was arrested and Carmen escaped when he turned the wrong way down a street and was captured by police. He uses her time machine to change the outcome of that incident, allowing him to take over V.I.L.E. and leaving Carmen exceedingly meek, and to attempt to overturn the outcome of the Civil War. His name is a reference to the Mason–Dixon line.
- Lee Jordan (voiced by David Coburn) is the first ACME agent to have captured Carmen Sandiego, and was among ACME's most accomplished employees, making him arrogant and womanizing. Embittered by his fame and the lack of challenge in fighting crime, he left ACME and helped Carmen Sandiego escape to train to be a V.I.L.E. agent, but his impulsive and violent nature clashed greatly with Carmen's more refined, pacifistic approach, leading her to fire him. One plot had him getting close to Ivy in "Boyhood's End" Pts. 1 & 2 so that he can have his revenge on Carmen Sandiego. In "Can You Ever Go Home Again?" Pt. 1 and 2, Lee sought his latest revenge on her, eventually kidnapping Malcolm Avalon, a businessman she believed to be her birth father, to blackmail her into stealing for him.
  - Cruiser is Lee Jordan's lead henchman who appears in "Can You Ever Go Home Again?" Pts. 1 & 2.

== Episodes ==
Season	Episodes	Originally released	
Season	Episodes	First released	Last released
1	13	February 5, 1994	September 24, 1994
2	8	February 4, 1995	March 25, 1995
3	10	September 16, 1995	December 23, 1995
4	9	September 9, 1996	January 2, 1999

== Cast ==
- Rita Moreno as Carmen Sandiego
- Jennifer Hale as Ivy
- Scott Menville as Zack
- Rodger Bumpass as the Chief
- Justin Shenkarow as the Player (season 1)
- Jeffrey Tucker as the Player (season 2)
- Asi Lang as the Player (seasons 3–4)
- Joanie Pleasant as the Player (seasons 3–4)

=== Additional voices ===
- James Avery
- Yoshio Be
- Jim Belushi – Paul Revere ("A Date with Carmen" Parts 1&2)
- Susan Blu
- Bettina Bush
- Rocky Carroll
- Kevin Castro
- David Coburn – Lee Jordan ("Boyhood's End" Parts 1 & 2, "Can You Ever Go Home Again?" Parts 1 & 2)
- Jesse Corti
- Tim Curry – Dr. Gunnar Maelstrom ("Retribution" Parts 1–3)
- Shelly DeSai
- Grisha Dimant
- Feisha Dimetros
- Michael Earl – Ira Gation (in "When it Rains")
- Jeannie Elias
- Dave Fennoy
- Efrain Figueroa
- John Garry
- Brian George
- Dan Gilvezan
- Fernanda Gordon
- Kevin Guillaume
- Alaina Reed Hall
- Clayton Halsey
- Jamie Hanes
- Dorian Harewood
- Jess Harnell
- Karen Hartman
- Phil Hayes
- Hector Herrera
- Amy Hill
- Vien Hong
- Michael Horse
- Patricia Van Ingen
- Robert Ito
- Marabina Jaimes
- Nick Jameson
- Marcia Jeffries
- Jamie Kaplan
- Janice Kawaye – Aileen ("Curses, Foiled Again")
- Gene Kidwell
- Clyde Kusatsu
- Alexander Kusnetzsrv
- Maurice LaMarche
- Joe Lala
- Frederick Lopez
- Danny Mann
- Dawn McMillan
- Sidney Miller
- Candi Milo – Tatiana ("Rules of the Game")
- Pat Musick
- Humberto Ortiz
- Laurel Page
- Samantha Paris
- Chadwick Pelletier – Gro ("Retribution" Part 2)
- Stan Phillips
- Matt Plendl
- Phil Proctor
- Lisa Raggio
- Don Reed
- Frank Renzulli
- Kevin Michael Richardson
- Robbie Rist
- Brogan Roche
- Eugene Roche
- Sean Roche
- Roger Rose
- John Rubinow
- Marco Sanchez
- Brandon Scott
- Alan Shearman
- Stacy Sibley
- Susan Silo
- Jane Singer
- Kath Soucie – Maria, Claire E. Net, Cora Net ("Music to My Ears")
- David H. Sterry
- Michael Su
- Russi Taylor
- Dierk Torsek
- Frank Welker
- Ian Whitcomb
- Reuven Bar Yotam

== History ==
=== Production and broadcast (1994–1999) ===
We optioned Carmen Sandiego three years ago. Originally our intent was to do it as a straight animated cartoon. The Fox Saturday morning series was based on the computer game designed by Bay Area-based Broderbund Software. As we developed it, it became a mixture of CGI, classical [sic] cel animation, computer graphics, live action, film clips, different styles of cel animation. The bed of the show is a mystery show with two kids searching for a thief, but there's so much stuff going on in mixed-media bags. The show is doing very well, and we think it's going to open the door for a lot of innovations.

— DIC Entertainment president Andy Heyward in interview with Variety.

The script for every Earth episode had to meet the approval of Broderbund, which created and owned the franchise. Their cause for concern was the level of violence on other FOX children's shows such as X-Men and Mighty Morphin Power Rangers. Broderbund did not require this of the creators of the World and Time game shows that aired on PBS, presumably since PBS, as the distributor of such shows as Sesame Street, had a long-standing reputation for non-violent educational children's programming. The lead characters of Earth were featured in Carmen Sandiego: Junior Detective, released in 1995. The opening theme song for the show is "Singt dem großen Bassa Lieder" from Wolfgang Amadeus Mozart's Die Entführung aus dem Serail, with new lyrics, pop instrumentation, and a backbeat. The Rainbow Animation Group (later renamed Galaxy World, Inc., not to be confused with the Italian studio Rainbow S.p.A.), and Han Yang Productions contributed some animation for this series.

=== Home media ===
Fox Kids Video released four VHS tapes of the series, containing two episodes each, in 1994.

In November 2001, Lions Gate Home Entertainment and Trimark Home Video released two VHS tapes, Carmen's Revenge and Time Traveler, consisting of the show's three-part episodes ("Retribution" and "Labyrinth", respectively) in a feature-length format. Time Traveler was also released on DVD, which included a DVD-ROM section with a demo of Where in the World is Carmen Sandiego? Treasures of Knowledge. Early copies of Treasures of Knowledge included a VHS of the episode "Timing is Everything". In September 2003, Sterling Entertainment Group released Into the Maelstrom and No Place like Home on VHS and DVD. Into the Maelstrom contained the three-part "Retribution" episode, while No Place like Home contained the episode "The Remnants" and the two-part episode "Can You Ever Go Home Again?" The DVD versions contained "When it Rains..." and "Follow My Footprints" as bonus episodes, respectively. NCircle Entertainment reissued both DVDs in 2007.

In June 2006, Shout! Factory and Sony Music Video released the first season on DVD. Due to poor sales, no further seasons were released.

Mill Creek Entertainment released the complete series on DVD as a four-disc set, as well as a ten-episode single-disc "best-of" collection, in Region 1 on February 21, 2012. These releases were reissued in June 2017, with the latter retitled ACME's Most Wanted. In 2025, a five-disc "30th Anniversary Edition" DVD set was released by Topaz Distribution.

PIDAX, a German company, released the complete series on DVD for Region 2 in three volumes in 2019 in English and German.

As of 2026, the series is available to stream on Tubi in the United States and Canada, and The Roku Channel in the United States.

== Reception ==
The show was given a rating of 4 stars out of 5 by Common Sense Media, noting that the format of the show – which includes trivia sessions between acts, vocabulary definitions, and the use of foreign languages – is "designed to pique kids' interest in these subjects". DVD Talk noted that the show exceeded the obligatory action of comedy of a cartoon, by respecting its audience with an intelligent sensibility rarely seen in children's television.
