= Where in the World Is Carmen Sandiego? Deluxe =

1992 video game

- Developer: Broderbund Software
- Publisher: Broderbund Software
- Series: Carmen Sandiego
- Platforms: DOS, FM Towns, Microsoft Windows, Classic Mac OS
- Release: 1992
- Genre: Educational/strategy
- Mode: Single-player

Where in the World Is Carmen Sandiego? Deluxe is a video game within the Carmen Sandiego franchise. It is the first remake of the 1985 title Where in the World Is Carmen Sandiego? and follows the Enhanced Version. It is sometimes referred to as Version 2.0 along with USA and Space. The Deluxe version featured additional animation and a reworked interface from the original version. Some of the bonus features included digitized photos from National Geographic, over 3200 clues, music from the Smithsonian/Folkways Recordings, 20 villains, 60 countries, and 16 maps. CD-ROM versions for DOS and Macintosh were released in 1992, and a Windows version was released in 1994.

International music from Smithsonian Folkways was approved for use in this game.

Where in the World is Carmen Sandiego? Deluxe, released on CD-ROM, adds digitized photographs from the National Geographic Society and music from Smithsonian/Folkways. Each location contains three sources of clues: The user can question a bystander, search the area, or call "Crime Net". Bystanders and "Crime Net" provide clues as to the suspect's location and, on occasion, additionally state something about the suspect. Searching an area along the perpetrator's path turns up an object that provides a clue as to the suspect's location. The Deluxe edition is the first in the series to feature dialogue spoken aloud, although most information still appears in written form and the dialogue of bystanders is not spoken but rather contained in speech balloons.

A Windows version, simply titled "Where in the World is Carmen Sandiego?", missing the "Deluxe" nomenclature release was also released in 1994. This version features gameplay that is visually similar to that of the "Deluxe" CD-ROM based variant, but further improved the graphics, video, and audio of the previous version. This can usually be identified by yellow and green split box design, as well as text specifically referencing Windows compatibility.

== Critical reception ==
In April 1994 Computer Gaming World said that the Deluxe CD version "adds substantial value to an already excellent game". The San Diego Union said the "'Carmen Sandiego Deluxe' game is challenging, but still fun", adding that "Kids will be anything but bored". Boston Globe said it was "for older children". Pittsburgh Post-Gazette described it as a "fast paced detective chase". The Los Angeles Times said "[Carmen Sandiego's] creators at Broderbund have remade her bigger and badder than ever in a terrific new CD-ROM release of "Where in the World Is Carmen Sandiego? Deluxe Edition", and gave the game a rating of 5 out of 5 stars.

The game was given a press score of 6.3 by IGN, and a Reader Review Average of 8.0, a GameFAQs Rating Average of 8.5, and a GameRankings Average of 6.2 off the website GameFAQs. Nintendo Power gave the game a rating of 3.075 out of 5. A review of the 1992 version of Where in the World Is Carmen Sandiego? by Gary Hartley for HonestGamers concluded by saying: "For the most part, this is a good game. It has its share of flaws, but you should find it above average overall". Hartley gave the game a score of 6/10 (Good). Carole Stewart McDonnell for the website Guide2Games gave a positive review for the 1992 version of the game Where in the World Is Carmen Sandiego?, saying "this is a fun way of learning world geography". The game was given a Christian Rating of 5/5 (nothing offensive), a Gameplay rating of 5/5 (excellent), a Violence rating of 5/5 (none) and an Adult Content rating of 4/5 (barely present).
