= List of Where on Earth Is Carmen Sandiego? episodes =

This is a list of Where on Earth is Carmen Sandiego? episodes. The show ran for a total of four seasons from February 5, 1994 to January 2, 1999. The first three seasons ran their episodes weekly, while the fourth season had a season premiere in September 1996, a 1996 Halloween special, then a three-part episode that aired mid-1998, and the final four episodes airing late 1998 to early 1999.

The episodes were aired out of their production order and intended broadcast order. As a result, episodes from one production season would sometimes air before all of the episodes from the previous season had aired, leaving the seasons without well-defined start or end dates, and using airdate alone to determine what season an episode belongs to is impossible. The seasons, however, can be distinguished by their different intros and outros, and by their bookends around commercial breaks, and the order in which they appear on the DVD releases matches what is known about the production codes, implying that the DVD order is correct.

== Series overview ==
This list goes by the original, intended production season DVD order, and ignores the order of broadcast.

| Season | Episodes | Originally released | |
| Season | Episodes | First released | Last released |
|---|---|---|---|
| 1 | 13 | February 5, 1994 | September 24, 1994 |
| 2 | 8 | February 4, 1995 | March 25, 1995 |
| 3 | 10 | September 16, 1995 | December 23, 1995 |
| 4 | 9 | September 9, 1996 | January 2, 1999 |

== Episodes ==
=== Season 1 (1994) ===
| No. overall | No. in season | Title | Directed by | Written by | Original release date | Prod. code | Locations |
|---|---|---|---|---|---|---|---|
| 1 | 1 | "The Stolen Smile" | Joe Barruso | Kimmer Ringwald, Michael Konik, and Sean Roche | February 5, 1994 | 101 | Amsterdam, Netherlands; Giza, Egypt; Paris, France; Lascaux Cave, France |
Carmen steals parts of famous artworks to try to create her own personal masterpiece with help from her henchman Touriest Classe.
| 2 | 2 | "A Higher Calling" | Joe Barruso | Kimmer Ringwald and Sean Roche | February 12, 1994 | 102 | Salisbury, England; Ellesmere Island; Palenque, Mexico; Easter Island; Ayers Rock, Australia |
When Carmen and her henchman Four Chin Hunter steal Stonehenge, ACME detectives have to travel to England, Canada, Mexico, Easter Island and Australia in order to retrieve the stolen items.
| 3 | 3 | "Dinosaur Delirium" | Joe Barruso | Thomas Peroutka and David Ehrman | February 19, 1994 | 103 | Agra, India; Washington, D.C.; Komodo Island, Indonesia |
Carmen steals four military helicopters and to India, Washington D.C., Indonesia. The two heroes must pursue to stop the creation of dinosaurs.
| 4 | 4 | "Moondreams" | Joe Barruso | Sam Graham and Chris Hubbell | March 5, 1994 | 104 | New York City, New York; Sichuan, China; Cape Canaveral, Florida; Andes Mountains in Peru |
Carmen is off on her most egotistical caper ever - attempting to put her face on the moon and create the world's largest billboard to herself.
| 5 | 5 | "By A Whisker" | Joe Barruso | Doug Molitor | March 12, 1994 | 105 | London, England; Gobi Desert, Mongolia; Vancouver, British Columbia, Canada; Siberia, Russia; Zambezi National Park, Zimbabwe |
When Carmen steals the Tower of London, the team must chase her to Mongolia, Vancouver, Siberia, and Zimbabwe in order to reclaim stolen artifacts before she uses them for her cats.
| 6 | 6 | "The Good Old, Bad Old Days" | Joe Barruso | Cydne Clark & Steve Granat | March 19, 1994 | 106 | Tokyo, Japan; Carson City, Nevada; Vienna, Austria; Tombstone, Arizona; Innsbruck-Tyrol, Austria |
When Carmen breaks into the "safest safe in the world", the team goes to Nevada, Vienna, Tombstone, and Tyrolean Alps to prevent Carmen's western train robbery with help from ACME detective Armando Arguaya.
| 7 | 7 | "Rules Of The Game" | Joe Barruso | Cecelia Fannon | April 9, 1994 | 107 | Saint Petersburg, Russia; Xi'an, China; Bavaria, Germany; Kīlauea, Hawaii |
When Carmen steals the car and statue of Catherine the Great, the team goes to Russia, China, Bavaria, and Hawaii in order to prevent a giant chess game while working with Russian ACME detective Tatiana.
| 8 | 8 | "Music To My Ears" | Joe Barruso | Doug Molitor | April 23, 1994 | 109 | Sydney, Australia; Vienna, Austria; Rio de Janeiro, Brazil; Venice, Italy |
Carmen and her henchmen Claire E. Net and Cora Net make off with the Sydney Opera House. To retrieve it, Zach and Ivy collaborate with Brazilian ACME detective Maria.
| 9 | 9 | "Chapter And Verse" | Joe Barruso | David Ehrman & Sean Roche | April 30, 1994 | 108 | Copenhagen, Denmark; London, England; Hannibal, Missouri; Maienfeld, Switzerland |
When Mark Twain's writing desk and Charles Dickens' inkwell are stolen, the detectives track Carmen to Rudyard Kipling's India as Carmen's henchman Sara Bellum tries to hack into the Chief's systems.
| 10 | 10 | "The Play's The Thing" | Joe Barruso | Richard Merwin & Sean Roche | May 7, 1994 | 110 | Los Angeles, California; Cairo, Egypt; Kyoto, Japan; Bushmills, Northern Ireland |
Carmen steals a series of items that the detectives soon deduce are all connected to theater.
| 11 | 11 | "Split Up" | Joe Barruso | Michael Maurer, Matt Uitz, and Sean Roche | September 24, 1994 | 111 | Mont-Saint-Michel, France; Vinci, Italy; Bihar, India; Antarctica |
When Carmen steals the entire Island of Mont Saint-Michel, Zack and Ivy split up to capture her in their own separate ways. On Ivy's part, she works with Italian ACME detective Marco and has an encounter with Sara Bellum.
| 12–13 | 12–13 | "A Date With Carmen" | Joe Barruso | Peter Lawrence & Sean Roche | September 10, 1994 | 112 | Arctic Russia; Boston present day, 1775 and 1773; Nagasaki, Japan in 1773; Philadelphia in 1752 |
| 12–13 | 12–13 | "A Date With Carmen" | Joe Barruso | David Bennett Carren & J. Larry Carroll | September 17, 1994 | 113 | Philadelphia in 1752; Boston in 1773; London, England in 1752; Boston in 1775, Philadelphia present-day |
Part 1: With help from Sara Bellum, Four Chin Hunter, and Pearl Diver, Carmen steals top secret research in order to steal something that does not exist. Part 2: As the team tries to put an end to Carmen's time-traveling scheme even when she is assisted by her henchman Al Loy, they meet Benjamin Franklin, John Adams, and Paul Revere.

=== Season 2 (1995) ===
| No. overall | No. in season | Title | Directed by | Written by | Original release date | Prod. code | Locations |
|---|---|---|---|---|---|---|---|
| 14 | 1 | "Skull and Double-Crossbones" | Joe Barruso | Doug Molitor | February 4, 1995 | 201 | Port Royal, Jamaica; Macao |
Zack and Ivy team up with Jamaican ACME detective Jasmine when a ghostly robbery of antique cannons caused by Carmen Sandiego and her henchman Rip Shipoff take place at Fort Charles, Jamaica.
| 15 | 2 | "Hot Ice" | Joe Barruso | Michael Medlock | February 11, 1995 | 202 | South Pacific; Coal Mine in Kentucky; Bali, Indonesia; San Francisco, California |
Carmen's mysterious break-in at ACME headquarters leads Zack and Ivy on their strangest case ever that involves Carmen springing her henchmen Dee Tritus from prison.
| 16 | 3 | "All For One" | Joe Barruso | Bruce Shelly & Reed Shelly | February 18, 1995 | 203 | Yangon, Myanmar; Oslo, Norway; Olympia, Greece |
When Carmen's henchmen Al Loy and Dara Riska botch a robbery of the Shwe Dagon Pagoda in Myanmar, Zack and Ivy are called in on the case.
| 17 | 4 | "Scavenger Hunt" | Joe Barruso | Melanie Williams & Perry Adleman | February 25, 1995 | 204 | Washington, D.C.; Moscow, Russia; Memphis, Tennessee; Amazon rainforest in Brazil |
Carmen gives Zack and Ivy a "clue" list of five items she plans to steal by midnight. Zach and Ivy are assisted by ACME detectives Armando and Titania.
| 18 | 5 | "When It Rains" | Joe Barruso | Sam Graham & Chris Hubbell | March 4, 1995 | 205 | McMinnville, Oregon; Odeillo, France; Amazon rainforest in Brazil; San Pedro de Atacama, Chile |
A copycat Carmen tries to pull off the most audacious crime in history and usurp Carmen's title as World Greatest Thief. After an encounter with V.I.L.E. operative Ira Gation, they soon discover that the culprit is actually Sara Bellum.
| 19 | 6 | "Déjà Vu" | Joe Barruso | Cecelia Fannon & Sean Roche | March 11, 1995 | 206 | Anchorage, Alaska; San Francisco, California; Tokyo, Japan; Santa Fe, New Mexico |
Zack thinks an old detective is too over the hill to help them on a case.
| 20–21 | 7–8 | "Boyhood's End" | Joe Barruso | Sean Roche, Melanie Williams & Perry Adleman | March 18, 1995 | 207 | Sahara desert in Egypt; Palermo, Sicily; Barcelona, Spain; Delphi, Greece |
| 20–21 | 7–8 | "Boyhood's End" | Joe Barruso | Sean Roche, Melanie Williams & Perry Adleman | March 25, 1995 | 208 | Delphi, Greece; Vatican City; Geneva, Switzerland; Philadelphia |
Part 1: Carmen kicks off another one of her crime sprees by stealing King Tut's sarcophagus, and Ivy is temporarily given a new partner when Zach is needed elsewhere. This person happens to be Lee Jordan who had solved 100 cases and had previously apprehended Carmen Sandiego in the past. Part 2: Lee frees Carmen and joins V.I.L.E. until he is fired for his impulsiveness, which sets him on an even darker path as he tries to prove himself a superior criminal than her.

=== Season 3 (1995) ===
| No. overall | No. in season | Title | Directed by | Written by | Original release date | Prod. code | Locations |
|---|---|---|---|---|---|---|---|
| 22 | 1 | "The Tigress" | Joe Barruso | Mark L. Hoffmeier | September 16, 1995 | 301 | Paris, France; Bayeux, France; Nagoya, Japan; South Pole |
A new thief called the Tigress emerges to challenge Carmen as she attempts to steal items relating to history's great strategic minds.
| 23 | 2 | "The Remnants" | Joe Barruso | Melanie Williams & Perry Adleman | September 23, 1995 | 302 | Washington, D.C.; Oyster Bay; New York; Menlo Park, New Jersey; San Francisco, California |
Carmen leads Zack and Ivy on a trip down her own memory lane by stealing objects about her favorite book series, The Wizard of Oz and they learn about her past. Ivy considers a new job and Chief pairs her and Zack up with a Basset Hound named Stretch as they contend with Carmen's henchmen Pop A. Wheelie and Iggy Nition.
| 24 | 3 | "Curses, Foiled Again" | Joe Barruso | Mark L. Hoffmeier | September 30, 1995 | 303 | Honolulu, Oahu, Hawaii; Waimea, Kauai, Hawaii; Hilo, Hawaii, Hawaii; Honolulu |
As Carmen makes moves around the Hawaiian Islands with her henchmen Hannah Lulu, Zack is worried his luck is heading south after losing his rabbit's foot.
| 25 | 4 | "Birds of a Feather" | Joe Barruso | Perry Adleman & Melanie Williams | October 7, 1995 | 304 | Banff, Alberta, Canada; London, England; Mazar-i-Sharif, Afghanistan; Hoy, Scotland, United Kingdom; Piedmont, California; Limerick, Ireland |
When the Star of Africa is stolen from the Tower of London with Carmen a continent away, the detectives have to wing it to figure out the bird connection to the case. Zach and Ivy collaborate with an ACME ornithologist named Chester and an Afghan ACME detective named Wahidullah while dealing with V.I.L.E. operatives Stu L. Pijin and Frank M. Poster.
| 26 | 5 | "Shaman Spirits" | Joe Barruso | Steve Granat & Cydne Clark and Rick Shin Gould | October 14, 1995 | 305 | Prince of Wales Island, Alaska; Mesa Verde, Colorado; Black Hills, South Dakota; Devil's Tower National Monument, Wyoming |
A recurring nightmare sends Carmen on a quest to seek help from some Native American elders. Zach and Ivy enlist the Native American ACME detective Billy Running Bird to help out.
| 27 | 6 | "Follow My Footprints" | Joe Barruso | Kevin West | October 21, 1995 | 306 | Patan, Nepal; Siberia, Russia; Laetoli, Tanzania; Milan, Italy; Kennedy Space Center, Florida; Moon; Himalayas |
When Carmen is seemingly killed in a plane crash in Nepal, ACME detectives and V.I.L.E. henchmen alike aim to solve the clues to her final caper per the will that Carmen wrote out that was written by her lawyer Lee Galese. After Abe L. Body was arrested trying to steal Hawaiian ashes as one of the possible answers to the clues, Zack and Ivy thwart the heists of Archie Ology in Tanzania, Lars Vegas and Moe Skeeter in Italy, and Sara Bellum in Florida with help from ACME detectives Armati and Michelle.
| 28–30 | 7–9 | "Labyrinth" | Joe Barruso | Written by : Wendell Morris & T.R. Sheppard; Story by : Joe Barruso | November 4, 1995 | 307 | Brussels, Belgium; Mammoth Cave National Park, Kentucky; Amsterdam, Netherlands |
| 28–30 | 7–9 | "Labyrinth" | Joe Barruso | Dennis O'Flaherty and Sean Roche | November 11, 1995 | 308 | Central American Jungle in 2101, New York, New York, Moscow, Russia; Abidjan, Côte d'Ivoire |
| 28–30 | 7–9 | "Labyrinth" | Joe Barruso | Doug Molitor | November 18, 1995 | 309 | Abidjan, Côte d'Ivoire in 2101, The Alps in 218 B.C.; Rome in 176 A.D.; Mammoth Cave National Park, Kentucky, present day |
Part 1: Zack and Ivy find Carmen's secret training facility and are put to the test where they encounter Carmen's henchmen Clay Tandoori and Touriest Class. Pt. 2: Woman of the Year...2101: Carmen heads to the future with Zack and Ivy on her tail and becomes a hero for stopping a crime. Pt. 3: When in Rome: With a magnet in tow, Carmen heads to ancient Rome with plans for a great heist, while Zack and Ivy try to stop her in time.
| 31 | 10 | "Just Like Old Times" | Joe Barruso | David Ehrman | December 23, 1995 | 310 | New York, New York; Greenland; London, England; Rome, Italy; New York, New York |
A Christmas caper sees Carmen reunited with the Chief as Zack and Ivy leave clues to lead Carmen to her next theft that involves Lars Vegas, Manny, and Moe Skeeter. While Zack and Ivy work to restore the Chief after he was hacked, Carmen commits her heist in London and is confronted by ACME detectives Barrow and Reggis.

=== Season 4 (1996–99) ===
| No. overall | No. in season | Title | Directed by | Written by | Original release date | Prod. code | Locations |
|---|---|---|---|---|---|---|---|
| 32 | 1 | "The Trial of Carmen Sandiego" | Stan Phillips | Bill Matheny & Laren Bright | September 9, 1996 | 401 | Copper Canyon, Mexico; Rome, Italy; New York, New York; Salisbury, England |
While on a heist with Archie Ology, Carmen has been kidnapped and put on trial by Judge R. Be Traitor for stealing Magna Carta. Zack and Ivy are made her defense team after Judge R.B. Traitor dismisses Lee Galese. Zack and Ivy must find out if she is innocent or guilty.
| 33 | 2 | "Trick or Treat" | Stan Phillips | Perry Adleman & Melanie Williams | October 31, 1996 | 402 | Beijing, China; San Francisco, California; Hollywood, Los Angeles; Silkeborg, Denmark; Ashland, Oregon |
Halloween approaches and Carmen is in the mood for a Halloween-themed heist with Sara Bellum.
| 34–36 | 3–5 | "Retribution" | Stan Phillips | Steve Granat & Cydne Clark | March 30, 1998 | 403 | Folsom State Prison, California; Liverpool, England in 1985; San Francisco, California; Sydney, Australia; North Atlantic Ocean; Belize in present day |
| 34–36 | 3–5 | "Retribution" | Stan Phillips | Douglas Booth | March 31, 1998 | 404 | Belize; Folsom State Prison, California; Key Largo, Florida; Bodø, Norway; Williamsburg, Virginia |
| 34–36 | 3–5 | "Retribution" | Stan Phillips | Doug Molitor | April 1, 1998 | 405 | Williamsburg, Virginia; Paris, France; Mersin, Turkey |
Pt. 1: The Unsinkable Carmen Sandiego: Carmen's greatest nemesis as a detective named Dr. Gunnar Maelstrom escapes from prison, and Chief tells the tale of Carmen stopping one of his greatest thefts. Pt. 2: In Memoriam: Zach and Ivy track Dr. Maelstrom to Belize as they realize he wants revenge against Carmen while Carmen wants to pay tribute to her fallen adversary. Pt. 3: Maelstrom's Revenge: Maelstrom puts his plans in action for his greatest theft and it is up to Zack, Ivy, and Carmen to work together and put a stop to his evil plan.
| 37 | 6 | "Timing is Everything" | Stan Phillips | Mark L. Hoffmeier | December 5, 1998 | 406 | Appomattox Court House, Virginia in present day; Appomattox Court House in 1865; Richmond, Virginia in present day; Charleston Harbor, South Carolina in 1864; Hampton Roads, Virginia in 1862; Amsterdam, Netherlands in 1991; Appomattox in present day |
Carmen's henchman Mason Dixon uses her time machine to change the past and put himself in charge of V.I.L.E., and he has plans to change America.
| 38 | 7 | "Cupid Sandiego" | Stan Phillips | Diane M. Fresco | December 12, 1998 | 407 | Seychelles; Blarney, Ireland; Verona, Italy |
Carmen, Moe Skeeter, and Lars Vegas steal from an ACME agent named Josha that is crushing on Ivy and decides to help him overcome his fears, in her own special way.
| 39–40 | 8–9 | "Can You Ever Go Home Again?" | Stan Phillips | David Ehrman | December 26, 1998 | 408 | Buenos Aires, Argentina; San Francisco, California; Volgograd, Russia; Switzerland |
| 39–40 | 8–9 | "Can You Ever Go Home Again?" | Stan Phillips | David Ehrman | January 2, 1999 | 409 | Switzerland; Washington, D.C., London, England, Tokyo, Japan, Los Angeles, California; Paris, France; Beijing, China |
Part 1: When Carmen steals from a wealthy industrialist named Malcolm Avalon, she makes a discovery that she has been searching for her whole life and is willing to get caught solving. To make matters worse, Lee Jordan has resurfaced with help from his henchman Cruiser. Part 2: Continuing from the last episode, Lee Jordan and Cruiser have kidnapped Malcolm Avalon. He is using Carmen's talents to steal for himself, forcing Zack, Ivy, Amanti, Billy Running Bird, Josha, Tatiana, and a Chinese ACME detective named Li to stop the madman's plan in time.
