= Carmen Sandiego Adventures in Math =

- Series logo
- Genre: Educational game
- Developer: Houghton Mifflin Harcourt
- Publisher: The Learning Company
- Platforms: Wii, Windows 8
- First release: The Lady Liberty Larceny; December 15, 2011
- Latest release: The Island of Diamonds; March 22, 2012

Carmen Sandiego Adventures in Math is a series of five games released in 2011/2012 for the Wii, and is part of the Carmen Sandiego franchise. The style of the games are reminiscent of comic books. The 5-part series were the first English language console games from the Carmen Sandiego franchise since The Secret of the Stolen Drums. These "short, educational detective adventures" were only available as a download through the Nintendo Wii Shop. The games were developed by Gamelion Studios, and published by Houghton Mifflin Harcourt. They could take up to 6 players, and required 600 Wii points. Maths topics included in the games include: Symmetry, Identifying angles, Graphing coordinates on a grid, Logic puzzles, Working with fractions, Solving equations, and Tangrams. The games are designed for elementary learners across grades 3–5.

== Production ==
With the recent release of The Magic School Bus on the DS, this game continued the trend of classic edutainment software being resurfaced. On this new development in the franchise, Bethlam Forsa, EVP Global Product Development for HMH said: "For decades, Carmen Sandiego has remained one of the most beloved, engaging educational institutions – helping students to master key concepts in reading, math, history, and geography. This new slate of games for the Wii, starting with "The Lady Liberty Larceny", will challenge students with fun new stories and characters".

Though the subject is math instead of geography, the gameplay is very reminiscent of the original Where in the World is Carmen Sandiego game. Much like the original games in the series, the game has a light-hearted sense of humour, and many of the characters have "funny, punny names". The game covers maths topics such as geometry, angles, axes, logic puzzles, and fractions, and is aimed at the school curriculum for Grades 4 and 5. The game is "presented as an animated comic book". Locations travelled to include New York City, Shanghai, and Berlin.

== Plot ==
The five games follow a similar plot. Carmen Sandiego and her VILE henchmen stole an item from a location, and The Chief has asked the player to go out and catch the thief. This mystery sees the player "chatting with a variety of colorful game characters in cities around the world".

== Gameplay ==
The aim of the game is to "travel the globe, solve brain-twisting math puzzles, and catch the crook". The game has 3 modes: Story Mode (a single-player playthrough of the game), Practice Mode (playing individual puzzles in single-player), and Multiplayer Mode (completing individual puzzles the fastest against other players). The players use Wii Remote to point at the screen and highlight characters to talk to, or point to the part of the screen the players want the agent to walk to. They can also press and hold the B Trigger at any time in these scenes, at which point the cursor transforms into a hidden object scanner. Each location will provide clues which will reveal where to head to next, and several Hint Coins are also scattered around the environments. After finding three clues, the players can study the dossiers of the V.I.L.E.'s motley crew of criminals and deduce who is the villain.

In these point and click adventures, players solve puzzles in the various environments that they explore, in a system described by Nintendo Life as "much like any of the Professor Layton games". All the puzzles are related to mathematics. While solving each individual puzzle helps the player to unravel the larger mystery, "the experience points and levelling system are completely arbitrary". Nintendo Life compared the game mechanics to the games featuring Professor Layton.

== Critical reception ==
Nintendo Life said "the Carmen Sandiego Adventures in Math series is truly an edutainment series with a whole lot of charm". The site added: "The one intelligent thing about these episodes is the ability to carry your character profile from one game to the next".

=== The Lady Liberty Larceny (12/15/11) ===
Common Sense Media gave the game 3/5 stars for both quality and learning, calling it a "fun, low-budget, educational gumshoeing adventure", and recommending it for "those who prefer reading to reflex-based action". It noted that fluctuations in puzzle difficulty, and a frustrating navigational problem near the end make the game frustratingly difficult as players struggle with how to progress. The game's educational properties – its abundance of "mathematical concepts...world geography, cultures and their customs" was praised. IGN noted a few similarities between this game and the Professor Layton series, and suggested that the former sought inspiration from the latter due to the gameplay elements of collecting coins and solving puzzles. Despite a small criticism of its short length, the game was given a rating of 8/10. Nintendo Life game the game 5/10 stars, writing "Carmen Sandiego Adventures in Math: The Lady Liberty Larceny could have been great, but falls very short of being significant. It looks and sounds nice, controls well and has a whole lot of charm, but what it comes down to is that the actual game itself as a whole package isn't very satisfying, even for 600 Points. If there had been more puzzles, or at least a different variety with each playthrough, then this would have been a very different story. But, as it stands, it's a bit of a robbery in itself". Giving the game a score of 13/30, Wiiloveit wrote: "Simply put, this so-called "comeback" of such a beloved educational franchise is far from enjoyable and I actually find it very upsetting that the developers didn't go to further lengths to fully capture what Carmen Sandiego has always been about". USA Today gave the game 3.5 stars out of 4, concluding "Carmen Sandiego Adventures in Math: The Lady Liberty Larceny makes doing math fun and it also presents a great mystery story for kids to solve".

=== The Big Ben Burglary (12/29/11) ===
Nintendo Life gave the game a rating of 5/10 stars, criticizing it for being short and having no replay value. It added that "the visuals are still underwhelming yet charming, and the music follows suit", and concluded that "newcomers might want to stay clear, but fans of the first won't be disappointed". IGN noted the sameness between this title and the previous one, and concluded that "anyone who enjoyed solving the mystery of the missing Statue of Liberty should be assured that bringing home Big Ben is similarly satisfying", rating the game 7 out of 10.

=== The Case of the Crumbling Cathedral (1/12/12) ===
Nintendo Life gave the game a rating of 5 stars out of 10, and said: "Without having played the previous two games in this ongoing series, you probably won't be too interested in getting this one either. While it retains all of the charm of the first two episodes, it does nothing more to improve on the formula or stand out as a worthwhile investment. At 600 Nintendo Points, the asking price isn't too outrageous, but the lack of depth and replayability is a glaring issue for anyone looking for a game with any sort of lasting appeal. Carmen Sandiego Adventures in Math: The Case of the Crumbling Cathedral is more of the same, and at this point you should know that it's not much to behold". PixelBit rated the game 2/5 stars, commenting: "With this third episode it becomes even clearer that Carmen Sandiego's adventure in math should've been released as one retail title that featured more polished gameplay and a greater selection of puzzles. If you've already picked up either of the first two episodes, "The Case of the Crumbling Cathedral" is not for you".

=== The Great Gateway Grab (2/2/12) ===
It was given a score of 5 stars out of 10 at Nintendo Life, a score of 4 stars out of 5 at Common Sense Media, and a score of 2 stars out of 5 at PixlBit.

=== The Island of Diamonds (3/22/12) ===
It was given a score of 5 stars out of 10 at Nintendo Life.
