= Carmen Sandiego (video game series) =

American educational mystery video game series

- Genre: Edutainment
- Developers: Broderbund; The Learning Company; Gameloft Brisbane
- Publishers: Broderbund; Houghton Mifflin Harcourt; Gameloft
- Creators: Gene Portwood; Dane Bigham; Lauren Elliott
- Platforms: Apple II, Commodore 64, MS-DOS, Windows, Mac, Nintendo Entertainment System, Super Nintendo Entertainment System, Xbox, PlayStation 2, GameCube, Nintendo DS, Wii, Facebook, iOS, Browser, Nintendo Switch PlayStation 4, PlayStation 5, Nintendo Switch 2
- First release: Where in the World Is Carmen Sandiego? 1985
- Latest release: Carmen Sandiego; 2025

Carmen Sandiego is a series of American educational mystery video games that spawned an edutainment franchise of the same name. The game released in 1985, Where in the World Is Carmen Sandiego?, started off both the video game series and the franchise as a whole, which has continued up to the present day. Each game of the series has a particular theme and subject, where the player must use their knowledge to find Carmen Sandiego or any of her innumerable henchmen. This series was originally owned by Broderbund, but is now owned by Houghton Mifflin Harcourt. Since its initial release the series has won over 125 awards and accolades. By 1992, Carmen Sandiego games had sold 2 million copies.

== Design ==
=== Background ===
The first six games during the Broderbund era

In 1983, the founders of Broderbund Software, Gary and Doug Carlston, publicly discussed a plan to make edutainment one of their company's three focus areas. The character of Carmen Sandiego was developed by David Siefkin, who drafted the first script of the game for Broderbund beside the Strawberry Canyon swimming pool of the University of California, Berkeley in 1984. Siefkin combined the character's first and last names from the Brazilian singer and actress Carmen Miranda and the city of San Diego, California. Carmen Sandiego was just one of several villains in the original script. She was chosen for the title role by the early project manager Katherine Bird because her name suggested mystery and exoticism, as well as humor. Siefkin departed the project shortly after writing the first script to become a Foreign Service Officer for the U.S. State Department, and served as a press and cultural attaché.

=== Gameplay ===
The first game in the series released in 1985, Where in the World Is Carmen Sandiego?, was designed and written by Gene Portwood and Lauren Elliott, and programmed by Dane Bigham. It established an original formula that was followed very faithfully in all Carmen Sandiego games. This formula involves a series of missions in which the computer player tracks and apprehends each of Carmen Sandiego's enemies. Each case begins with the player being alerted that a spectacular theft has been committed. Immediately transported to the scene of the crime, the player must find clues to infer the suspect's next destination and to create an arrest warrant describing the guilty party's attributes. The culprit travels through a series of different locations around the world in an attempt to shake off any pursuers, so the player will have to continue tracking the thief for some time. The game continues in this manner until the player catches up with the culprit, at which point the thief is arrested, and if the warrant is correct, the player puts the thief in ACME prison. As more and more thieves are arrested, the player rises up through ACME's ranks, and the later cases assigned to the player will become more difficult. On the final case, the perpetrator is revealed to be Carmen Sandiego herself, and the game ends when the player successfully captures her and is later inducted into the ACME Hall of Fame.

With the release of Word Detective, Math Detective, and Great Chase Through Time, Broderbund began to abandon the original formula in 1997. Word Detective and Math Detective involves the player infiltrating V.I.L.E. hideouts around the world and therefore maintain the globe-hopping element of previous games. However, Great Chase Through Time completely abandoned the series' original formula and has the player spending each mission in one time period, where the goal is to create makeshift solutions to any historical problems that the theft has caused and find the thief whom Carmen Sandiego has dropped off. The final mission of the game involves the player to track down Carmen Sandiego similar to the traditional formula, although the player does not construct a warrant.

=== Style of humor ===
The games created by Broderbund featured silly humor with a distinctive style of word play with extensive use of puns, rhymes, and alliteration. This style of word play was also present, in varying degrees, in all three Carmen Sandiego television shows.

Gag names ("Hardley Worthit", "Rob M. Blind", "Ruth Less", "Joy Ryder", "M. T. Pockets", etc.) were quite frequently used in the games, often to the point where Carmen herself seemed to be the only person without such a name. Clues about the suspect's next destination often used extended puns (example: "I pumped her for information, but her unrefined answer only suggested a crude plan to visit oil wells near Ahvaz") or rhyming couplets. Even as the games began to abandon their original formula, this word play was still retained. For example, a news report on massive blackouts from Carmen Sandiego Math Detective quotes an official as saying, "We're taking a dim view of the situation".

Although Carmen's V.I.L.E. gang members were often portrayed as cartoonish buffoons, they seemed to be capable of "stealing" landmarks, cities, national parks, notable cultural exports (such as "stealing all the sushi from Japan") and the like. Her thieves have also been known to steal geographic features and even nonexistent map features such as the Mason–Dixon line. Some thefts were even non sequiturs based on word play, such as "robbing the banks of the Nile" or plays on the word "steal" such as "stealing the show".

== Video games ==
=== Broderbund-developed games ===
==== Where in the World Is Carmen Sandiego? (1985, 1996) ====
The original version was released in 1985. The goal of this game is to track Carmen's villains around the world and arrest them and later ultimately arrest Carmen herself. In order to make an arrest, the user had to have a warrant for the correct villain. The player began the game by visiting the city and country where the crime took place, and then obtaining hints from the bystanders on where the thief went next, leading them on a chase around the world to find the thief before they "get away". In the process, the player collected clues about the villain’s identity to determine who the culprit is. When the player reached their final destination, the player presented the accurate warrant to arrest the villain.

The deluxe version was released in 1992 and featured additional animation and a reworked interface. Sarah Nade was added to this version of Carmen Sandiego Software. CD-ROM versions for DOS and Macintosh were released in 1993, and a Windows version was released in 1994. The Windows version was later re-released as Where in the World is Carmen Sandiego? Classic Edition.

The reboot version was released in 1996 with a new gameplay interface and animated characters. This version features QuickTime videos of actress Lynne Thigpen reprising her role as "The Chief" from the eponymous PBS game show, a role she would also play in the U.S.A. and Time reboot games released during that same period.

==== Where in the U.S.A. Is Carmen Sandiego? (1986, 1996) ====
This title was released in 1986. Similar to World, the goal of this game is to track Carmen's villains around the United States, and arrest them and later ultimately arrest Carmen herself. In order to make an arrest, the user must have the correct warrant. The user gets information from the bystanders on where the thief went next and what the thief looks like. When the user reaches his/her final destination where the villain is going to pass off the loot to Carmen, he/she has to arrest them.

==== Where in Europe Is Carmen Sandiego? (1988) ====
Where in Europe Is Carmen Sandiego? is one of the many games in the Carmen Sandiego series. It focuses on the European history and geography. The gameplay is very similar to that of Where in the World Is Carmen Sandiego?, meaning that the player is sent to a location, has to find clues to lead them to the next location, and builds up a warrant along the way. This was the first of the games to have a database built into the crime computer, where players could narrow down their next stop by entering information such as flag colors, currency used, and languages mentioned. Production of the game was discontinued in 1990 due to the fall of the Eastern Bloc and drastic border and government changes that resulted.

==== Where in Time Is Carmen Sandiego? (1989, 1997) ====
The original version was released in 1989. The goal of this game is to track Carmen's villains through history and arrest them and later ultimately capture Carmen herself.

The reboot version was released in 1997 and later renamed Carmen Sandiego's Great Chase Through Time. This version was heavily influenced by and features villains from the short-lived PBS game show.

==== Where in America's Past Is Carmen Sandiego? (1991) ====
This game is widely considered the most informational game of the entire series. Though it may contain some minute differences from the main series, it remains true to it. This game's aim is to capture Carmen's gang of thieves, one by one until all of her henchmen have been caught. This is done by searching for clues, trailing them, identifying them and finally, bringing them in for trial. After all of the henchmen have been caught, the player must then go after Carmen herself. One of the main differences is that the player can receive in-game help.

==== Where in Space Is Carmen Sandiego? (1993) ====
The intention of this game is to teach astronomy. The player flies in a rocket ship throughout the Solar System, interrogating various alien lifeforms in order to solve the theft of an important part of the Solar System (e.g. Saturn's rings). There was only a limited amount of fuel available for travel, and if the player does not ask the right questions on the right planets, or followed the wrong clues, the criminal(s) would get away and leave the player to start anew with another crime. This version is somewhat similar to Where in the World Is Carmen Sandiego?. Kneemoi was introduced in this installment.

==== Junior Detective Edition (1995) ====
This title was released in 1995 and features characters from the Earth animated series. It uses a simplified version of the standard gameplay designed for younger players.

==== Carmen Sandiego Word Detective (1997) ====
This title was released in 1997. This game is intended to teach language arts for kids age 9-12. The game features Chase Devineaux.

In the game Carmen Sandiego has invented a machine called the Babble-On Machine, and the user, playing the role of Agent 13, has to thwart her plans and free all the other agents that have been captured by Carmen.

The game is very similar to Carmen Sandiego Math Detective.

==== Carmen Sandiego Math Detective (1998) ====
This title was released in 1998 and is intended to teach Math for kids age 9-12. The game features Chase Devineaux.

In the game, Carmen Sandiego has invented a machine called the Quantum Crystallizer, and the user, playing the role of Agent 9, has to thwart her plans and restore 12 landmarks that Carmen has shrunk with the machine.

The game is very similar to Carmen Sandiego Word Detective.

=== The Learning Company (formerly SoftKey)-developed games ===
==== Carmen Sandiego's ThinkQuick Challenge ====
This game teaches multiple subjects for kids ages 9–12. It was also the first title in the Carmen Sandiego series to be released by The Learning Company (formerly SoftKey). The game features Chase Devineaux.

In the game, Carmen Sandiego has invented KnowBots to steal knowledge and the player(s) have to try and thwart her plans. This game is set up much like the Carmen Sandiego game shows on PBS and is the only multiplayer game of the series.

==== Where in the World Is Carmen Sandiego? Treasures of Knowledge ====
This game was released in 2001.

==== Carmen Sandiego: The Secret of the Stolen Drums ====
This game, released in 2004, is the first in the series to give the player complete control of a character in a 3-dimensional world. The avatar, Cole, must maneuver through stages including a museum in New York City, the beaches of New Zealand, and Machu Picchu. The player fights against Carmen's robots and spirits to prevent her from stealing an enchanted diamond, the repository of all the knowledge of the nations.

==== Mais où se Cache Carmen Sandiego? Mystère au Bout du Monde ====
This is a French language Carmen Sandiego game released in 2009.

==== Carmen Sandiego Adventures in Math ====
This is a series of games released in 2011/2012 for the Wii

- The Lady Liberty Larceny (Dec 15, 2011)
- The Big Ben Burglary (Dec 29, 2011)
- The Case of the Crumbling Cathedral (Jan 12, 2012)
- The Great Gateway Grab (Feb 2, 2012)
- The Island of Diamonds (Mar 22, 2012)

==== Where in the World Is Carmen Sandiego's Luggage? ====
This is a Carmen Sandiego game that was based on the game shows and video games, and "was used as part of a classroom-based customer service training course at Scandinavian Airways Systems (SAS)". Games and Learning writes: "The corporate sector...embraced game-based learning early on with games like Where in the World is Carmen Sandiego’s Luggage?, a customer service training tool". The date of release is unknown.

==== Carmen Sandiego Returns ====
This title was released in 2015 on iOS and Windows.

==== Where in the World Is Carmen Sandiego? The Trivia Game ====
In 2019, Houghton Mifflin Harcourt licensed Carmen Sandiego to Global Eagle for them to make a trivia game to be played on airlines.

==== Carmen Sandiego Handheld Electronic Game ====
In late 2019, Basic Fun released an interactive handheld version of Carmen Sandiego.

==== Carmen Sandiego: To Steal or Not To Steal ====
The interactive animated film was released on Netflix in 2020. It involves Carmen Sandiego saving Ivy and Zack when V.I.L.E. captures them during a heist in Shanghai.

=== Gameloft-developed games ===
==== Where in the World Is Carmen Sandiego? (2008) ====
Where in the World Is Carmen Sandiego? was released by Gameloft around 2008–2009. This game sees the titular thief Carmen Sandiego and her VILE gang steal jewels from museums around the world and to try to find out the famous confession of Leonardo da Vinci's brother Ruperta. The player's goal is to stop Carmen and capture her thieves. Starting as an inexperienced rookie, the player's first quest is to retrieve the Napoleon bowl that was stolen from the Louvre museum in Paris and apprehend the thief. It is then revealed that the bowl has spaces for 8 jewels, and it is the players' task to find these treasures. The game is an arcade game combined with an adventure game, consisting of twelve increasingly difficult cases to solve.

Each investigation sends the player to various cities around the world. Their task is to interrogate witnesses, find out what the perpetrator looks like (three clues are required to obtain an arrest warrant), and obtain clues about their whereabouts. Players have seven days to solve each case. The player chooses the next destination on a map: if they choose incorrectly they lose time.

As the player gains experience, they gain access to two useful gadgets - the almanac (which contains detailed information about the city) and a scanner (which helps to find clues in the city). The game includes 3 mini-games: "World Chase" - selecting the capital of a given country, "Flag Quiz" - recognizing the flag of a given country, and "Face Match" - remembering then indicating facial features.

==== Carmen Sandiego (2025) ====
In September 2024, Gameloft and HarperCollins Productions announced a new single-player game in the Carmen Sandiego franchise titled Carmen Sandiego. The game, developed by Gameloft's in-house studio Gameloft Brisbane, was released on March 4, 2025, initially on Netflix before being distributed on Steam, Nintendo Switch, PlayStation and Xbox. The story and visuals are based on the Carmen Sandiego Netflix series, which ran from 2019 to 2021. According to the game announcement, players take on the role of Carmen Sandiego herself. As in the Netflix series, Carmen is depicted as a hero who is tasked with tracking down and defeating V.I.L.E. villains. A classic mode called "The Acme Files" also exists, which the publishers said was a tribute to the classic Carmen Sandiego games of the 1980s. At the Australian Game Developer Awards 2025, the game was nominated for the Excellence in Mobile award.

=== Browser games ===
==== Where on the Web Is Carmen Sandiego? ====
On September 1, 1999, Internet solutions firm Rare Medium created a Carmen Sandiego website for The Learning Company which included a Where on the Web is Carmen Sandiego? game that took kids through educational links.

Where on the Web Is Carmen Sandiego? was a free online adventure for grades 4-8. The game built reading comprehension and critical thinking skills. Student teams completed one cross-curricular mission per week during the six-week challenge. Teams could save their progress for later completion. Every class that completed four of six missions would have a chance to win a new computer loaded with The Learning Company educational software. The program began in February 2000. The synopsis says: "As special agents of the ACME Detective Agency, kids will embark on missions to track down the devious Carmen Sandiego and her cohorts, collecting clues and learning about the world (and the Internet) to solve the case". The project was design directed by Eric Wood.

==== Where in the World Is Carmen Sandiego? (2011) ====
In 2011, a Facebook version of Where in the World Is Carmen Sandiego? was released.

==== Where on Google Earth Is Carmen Sandiego? ====
In 2019, Google partnered with Houghton Mifflin Harcourt to develop a series of Carmen Sandiego capers that utilized Google Earth as the world map, the first released in March, but was otherwise playing out similar to the original 1985 video game.

== Homages and cultural references ==
- The 1991 video game The Treehouse featured the Carmen Sandiego theme as a song to play on its keyboard minigame.
- The acapella group The Vineyard Sound covered the original theme "Where in the World is Carmen Sandiego?" on their 1995 album Part Deux.
- The acapella group Techiya parodied the original theme "Where in the World is Carmen Sandiego?" on their 2010 album Techiya Sunrise.
- The band The Relay Company's 2010 album X features the song "Marco Polo", which mentions Carmen Sandiego by name in the chorus.
- MC Lars' 2016 album Donald Trump Has Really Bad Morals features the song "Carmen Sandiego Has Really Bad Morals".
- The band Flying Coach's 2018 EP "The Flying Five Family Funtime" features the song "Carmen Sandiego".
- The band Being Beta's 2018 album Read More Books features the song "Where in My Life is Carmen Sandiego".
- The band Grizfolk's 2019 album Rarest of Birds features the song "Carmen Sandiego".
- Tatiana Hazel's 2020 album Duality features the song "Carmen Sandiego".
- The 2021 video game Chinatown Detective Agency is heavily inspired by the Carmen Sandiego series, particularly the user interface of Where in the World? Deluxe.

== See also ==
- Where in the World Is Carmen Sandiego? (game show, 1991)
- Where in Time Is Carmen Sandiego? (game show, 1997)
- Where on Earth Is Carmen Sandiego? (TV series, 1994)
