= Where in Time Is Carmen Sandiego? =

Where in Time is Carmen Sandiego? may refer to:

- Where in Time Is Carmen Sandiego? (video game), a 1989 video game
- Carmen Sandiego's Great Chase Through Time (previously known as Where in Time Is Carmen Sandiego?), a 1997 video game
- Where in Time Is Carmen Sandiego? (game show), an American television game show

== See also ==
- Carmen Sandiego (disambiguation)
- Where in the U.S.A. Is Carmen Sandiego? (disambiguation)
- Where in the World Is Carmen Sandiego? (disambiguation)
