= Where in the World Is Carmen Sandiego? =

Where in the World Is Carmen Sandiego? may refer to:

- Carmen Sandiego (franchise), a media franchise sometimes referred to as Where in the World Is Carmen Sandiego?
- Carmen Sandiego (video game series), several of which are titled Where in the World Is Carmen Sandiego?
  - Where in the World Is Carmen Sandiego? (1985 video game), the first video game in the series
  - Where in the World Is Carmen Sandiego? (1988 video game), a Prodigy game
  - Where in the World Is Carmen Sandiego? Deluxe, a 1992 video game
  - Where in the World Is Carmen Sandiego? (1996 video game), partially based on the television game show
  - Where in the World Is Carmen Sandiego? Treasures of Knowledge, a 2001 video game
  - Where in the World Is Carmen Sandiego? (2008 video game), a Gameloft game
  - Where in the World Is Carmen Sandiego? 3 – New Carmen Adventure, a 2009 video game
  - Where in the World Is Carmen Sandiego? (2011 video game), a Facebook game
  - Where in the World Is Carmen Sandiego? The Trivia Game, a 2019 video game
  - Where in the World Is Carmen Sandiego's Luggage?, an undated video game
- Where in the World Is Carmen Sandiego? (game show), an American television game show
  - Where in the World Is Carmen Sandiego? (album), a 1992 soundtrack album for the television game show
    - "Where in the World Is Carmen Sandiego?" (song), a 1992 song by Rockapella

== See also ==
- Carmen Sandiego (disambiguation)
- Where in the U.S.A. Is Carmen Sandiego? (disambiguation)
- Where in the World (disambiguation)
- Where in Time Is Carmen Sandiego? (disambiguation)
- Where on Earth Is Carmen Sandiego?, an American animated television series
