= Where in the U.S.A. Is Carmen Sandiego? =

Where in the U.S.A. Is Carmen Sandiego? may refer to:

- Where in the U.S.A. Is Carmen Sandiego? (1986 video game)
- Where in the U.S.A. Is Carmen Sandiego? Deluxe, a 1992 video game
- Where in the U.S.A. Is Carmen Sandiego? (1996 video game)
- Where in America is Carmen Sandiego?: The Great Amtrak Train Adventure, a 1998 video game

== See also ==
- Carmen Sandiego (disambiguation)
- Where in the World Is Carmen Sandiego? (disambiguation)
- Where in Time Is Carmen Sandiego? (disambiguation)
