= Carmen Sandiego: The Secret of the Stolen Drums =

2004 video game

- PAL region PS2 cover art
- Developer: Artificial Mind and Movement
- Publisher: BAM! Entertainment
- Series: Carmen Sandiego
- Platforms: Xbox, PlayStation 2, GameCube
- Release: PAL: March 5, 2004; NA: August 31, 2004
- Genres: Action-adventure, platformer
- Mode: Single-player

Carmen Sandiego: The Secret of the Stolen Drums is a 2004 action-adventure video game developed by A2M and published by BAM! Entertainment (European distribution being handled by Acclaim Entertainment) under license by The Learning Company. The game is based on the Carmen Sandiego series and features Cole Gannon along with Jules Argent, Shadow Hawkins and the Chief of Where in the World Is Carmen Sandiego? Treasures of Knowledge. The game was originally scheduled to be released in the U.S. on December 12, 2003, but was delayed by almost nine months; it did, however, get released in the PAL region on March 5, 2004.

== Gameplay ==
This game is the first in the Carmen Sandiego series to give the player complete control of a character in a 3D world. The avatar, ACME agent Cole Gannon, must maneuver through multiple stages including a museum in New York City, the beaches of New Zealand, the palace in Bangkok, Machu Picchu, and five other exotic locations. The player fights against Carmen's robots and spirits to prevent her from stealing a beautiful diamond, the repository of all the knowledge of the nations. The game also features an in-game PDA system in which Shadow and Jules can send "video mail".

== Reception ==
Reception

Aggregate score
Aggregator	Score		
Aggregator	GameCube	PS2	Xbox
Metacritic	57 / 100	53 / 100	53 / 100

Review scores
Publication	Score		
Publication	GameCube	PS2	Xbox
Game Informer	N/A	6 / 10	N/A
Gamekult	N/A	4 / 10	4 / 10
GameSpot	4.7 / 10	4.7 / 10	4.7 / 10
GameZone	N/A	5 / 10	N/A
IGN	5.6 / 10	5.6 / 10	5.6 / 10
Jeuxvideo.com	9 / 20	9 / 20	9 / 20
NGC Magazine	70%	N/A	N/A
Nintendo Power	3.4 / 5	N/A	N/A
Official U.S. PlayStation Magazine	N/A	2.5/5	N/A
Official Xbox Magazine (US)	N/A	N/A	5.5 / 10

The game received "mixed" reviews on all platforms according to the review aggregation website Metacritic. A lot of magazines gave the game mixed reviews while it was still in development.

IGN's closing comments were: "Is Carmen Sandiego: The Secret of the Stolen Drums worth your hard earned cash? Well, if you're a major fan of the television show and PC games, then no. If you're a gamer looking for sweet platforming action, then no...It may [however] entertain the kiddies for a while. Otherwise, simply rent it if you're curious."
