= Carmen Sandiego's Great Chase Through Time =

1997 edutainment video game

- The cover for the game from 1997 to 1999 as Where in Time Is Carmen Sandiego?
- Developer: Broderbund
- Publishers: Broderbund Software; The Learning Company (after Broderbund's purchase)
- Series: Carmen Sandiego
- Platforms: Windows, Mac OS
- Release: US: August 13, 1997
- Genres: Educational, adventure
- Mode: Single-player

Carmen Sandiego's Great Chase Through Time (previously Where in Time Is Carmen Sandiego? and sometimes given the subtitle v3.0) is a 1997 edutainment point-and-click adventure game developed by Broderbund for Microsoft Windows and Macintosh devices. The game is a remake of the 1989 time-travel title Where in Time Is Carmen Sandiego?, making it the second Time video game in the Carmen Sandiego franchise. The game was strongly influenced by the short-lived PBS game show, Where in Time Is Carmen Sandiego?. The game was previewed at the 1997 Toy Fair in New York City. A demo version was included on the CD for Carmen Sandiego Word Detective and was available on the Carmen Sandiego website. After Broderbund was sold to The Learning Company, the game was re-released with a new title – Carmen Sandiego's Great Chase Through Time – but with minimal redesign.

The game's narrative involves master thief Carmen Sandiego, who has used a time machine called the Chronoskimmer to plant her associates at key historical events to stop them from occurring. The object of the game is to track down Carmen Sandiego and her henchmen by jumping through time tunnels that link historical periods together, retrieve the stolen item, and correct the course of history. During each case, the player visits a well-known historical event, such as the signing of the Declaration of Independence or Lewis and Clark's expedition to the Pacific Northwest, and meets historical figures like Queen Hatshepsut, William the Conqueror, and Yuri Gagarin. At the end of case 18, the player locates the Chronoskimmer, thereby acquiring the tools to chase and capture Carmen for the final case.

Carmen Sandiego's Great Chase Through Time received critical acclaim upon its release, earning praise for its story, soundtrack, puzzle-solving and historical content. It was awarded "Computer Edutainment Game of the Year" at the 1st Annual Interactive Achievement Awards.

== Gameplay ==
On the opening screen, the player can choose to sign into the ACME roster to begin a game, continue with a saved one, or create a customized game by selecting one or more cases (a feature recommended for teachers). The game is a point-and-click adventure with a changeable cursor, drop-down menus, and on-screen icons. Players must identify on-screen "hot spots" to find items that will help their progress. In each case, the player must investigate clues to help a historical figure solve a problem, recover a stolen treasure, and capture a thief. ACME agents referred to as "Good Guides" are available to help the player to complete each challenge. The player also has access to the ACME Agent Handbook supplied with the game, which contains hints and suggestions for solving the puzzles. Each case involves a four-step process of identifying the theft, solving the problem, collecting the Carmen notes, and arresting the thief.

The game is divided into 19 cases, starting in Ancient Egypt and advancing towards the modern day. The player must complete all cases to win the game. Before starting a case, the Chief will tell the player the nature of the problem in the period of history. At the start of each case, the player will be assisted by one of five accompanying Good Guides (Ann Tickwittee, Ivan Idea, Rock Solid, Renee Santz, and Polly Tix), characters who are knowledgeable about the culture of each case's historical period and are paired with the player based on a particular area of historical expertise. The group consists of Ann Tickwittee (ancient civilizations and general knowledge), Ivan Idea (inventions), Rock Solid (exploration), Renee Santz (arts and culture), and Polly Tix (political and military conflicts). They provide some historical context and mention any notable figures who will appear throughout the case. They also help the player by liaising with the historical figures on the player's behalf. After clicking on a person, the player can proceed to question them about their situation. If necessary, they may then re-ask any questions via rollover text to extract further information. Historical characters' responses guide the player toward that period's task.

The player begins the game with the rank of Time Pilot but is promoted by the Chief as the game progresses, advancing to Time Scout, Time Trooper, Time Detective, Time Inspector, and, by the end of the game, achieving the rank of Time Sleuth, enabling a chance to capture Carmen Sandiego.

Carmen and her crooks in the Opening Sequence. From left to right: mobster Buggs Zapper, engineer Jane Reaction, knight Sir Vile, witch Medeva, Carmen Sandiego, pilot Baron Grinnit, mad scientist Dr. Belljar, Jacqueline Hyde, General Mayham, and hacker Dee Cryption.

Items must be collected and moved around the screen or placed in the inventory box to complete cases. Characters will either offer the player objects, or the player must seek out items that can be taken. Collectible items can be kept for later use by dragging the object into the Inventory box. Players must also look for scraps of the Carmen Notes, which describe where each thief will hide. These notes have each been torn into three pieces to make them more difficult to find. The player must click on the scraps of paper to assemble them into a whole note. Once all the pieces of the Carmen note are found, the ACME handcuffs (known as Time Cuffs) activate and the player can decode Carmen's message to deduce her henchmen's location. Using the Time Cuffs on the relevant object reveals the thief, whom the Good Guide then arrests. After capturing each crook (with Dee Cryption captured once and the others captured twice), the player pursues Carmen herself.

The player can access the Chronopedia, a historical guide that provides information about each time period and its important people, places, maps, and events. Each Good Guide carries a section of the Chronopedia and gives the player the relevant chapter upon arrival in each time period. All the text within the Chronopedia was reviewed and approved by editors of the Encyclopædia Britannica. The information may be used to decipher Carmen's notes.

The gameplay mechanics change once the player retrieves the Chronoskimmer at the end of Case 18, which sees Carmen relinquishing her stolen item to the player. Instead of staying within the same time period for the duration of the final case, the player now follows clues at each location to work out where to go next. This is a return to the Where in Time Is Carmen Sandiego? mechanic. Though the player now has the ability to travel to any period in history whenever they like, Carmen may only travel to time periods that she has already visited, and therefore the game restricts the player to the time periods of the previous cases. Parts of the screen previously occupied by Carmen's notes and in-game collectible items are replaced with the Chronoskimmer slider and the travel button. Throughout this case, the player receives help from all five ACME Good Guides. Originally, players could visit a themed website for "more in-depth learning" about the cultures visited in the game, which included "articles from Brittanica [sic], hints, and a feedback area". The site also had a Christopher Columbus minigame, which was linked to the finished game's tenth case. Additionally, it offered an extended free trial exclusively to owners of the game. The site - along with the other Carmen Sandiego pages created by Broderbund Software and maintained by The Learning Company - was shut down in 2005.

== Plot ==
Lynne Thigpen as The Chief

The game begins in the present day, when Carmen Sandiego breaks into ACME Timenet headquarters in San Francisco and steals a time travel device called the ACME Chronoskimmer. Carmen sends her V.I.L.E. villains Sir Vile, Dr. Belljar, Baron Grinnit, Medeva, General Mayhem, Jacqueline Hyde, Buggs Zapper, Jane Reaction, and Dee Cryption to travel through time and steal historical treasures, thereby altering the course of history. She also provides them with a note detailing where to hide before she picks them up.

After the theft, the Chief greets the player and explains the importance of recovering the device and restoring history, as well as the Chronoskimmer's safeguard mechanic of leaving time tunnels behind. The Chief sends the player on a series of missions to stop Carmen and her crooks. Each mission has the players paired up with a Good Guide like Ann Tickwittee, Ivan Idea, Rock Solid, Renee Santz, and Polly Tix.

After the eighth case is solved and all the crooks are incarcerated, Carmen Sandiego uses the Chronoskimmer to bail them out and commit more thefts in history. After reinforcing the prison with "laser bars", the Chief sends the player to recapture the crooks and catch Carmen once and for all. After the player finishes recapturing the crooks and restoring history while capturing the final crook Dee Cryption, Carmen Sandiego lets the player retrieve the Chronoskimmer and then goes through time, leading the player on a chase through all of the previously visited time periods until she returns to the present to steal her personal dossier from ACME HQ. After a chase by all five Good Guides, Carmen Sandiego is caught and incarcerated.

Once the player is successful, the Chief lets them in on top secret information: Carmen Sandiego was once an ACME agent, but she felt the challenge of catching crooks was too easy, so she became a villain to outsmart her former colleagues. She aimed to delete a detailed dossier about her transition, which is thematically linked to her desire to delete the memory of history's greatest figures and achievements (dubbed "Project: History Sweep"), under the pretense of simply "stealing history's greatest treasures". While incarcerated, Carmen tells the players that they won't be able to hold on to her for long.

Though unstated in the game, it is implied that Carmen Sandiego only ordered her henchmen to steal these items as a decoy to ensure the ACME headquarters was completely empty while all agents were cleaning up her trail of historical messes.

== Characters and cast ==
The only live-action role in the game was that of The Chief, played by Lynne Thigpen. All other roles were performed as voice-overs. Brenda Burke, who played Carmen Sandiego on the game show's second season, voiced the character in the game. Although most of the voice actors in the game only play one character, some performed multiple roles in different cases. For example, Charles Martinet plays both William Shakespeare and Ludwig van Beethoven. Jarion Monroe plays a mixture of both historical and fictional characters: Ivor the Blacksmith, Kublai Khan, Huang the Merchant, Richard Burbage, and Yuri Gagarin. While the voice actors playing most of the crooks are not credited, Francine Scott is credited as playing "Villains".

The game distinguishes between historical and fictional characters with rollover text that is displayed when the cursor is placed over a character. With a few exceptions (including ACME agents, V.I.L.E. villains, and the peasants in Case 5), characters who have both first and last names are genuine historical figures, while characters with only a first name or a descriptive title are fictional. However, some of the real historical figures like Queen Elizabeth I and Montezuma are referred to by only their first names.

== Development and release ==
By 1991, Broderbund had released five successful Carmen Sandiego games: World (1985), USA (1985), Europe (1988), Time (1989), and America's Past (1991). This year marked the franchise's debut into television with the PBS game show Where in the World Is Carmen Sandiego? hosted by Greg Lee, starring Lynne Thigpen as the Chief, and featuring the a cappella band Rockapella. This series ultimately lasted for five seasons, winning six Daytime Emmy Awards throughout its run. After cancellation World was followed by a less successful spin-off entitled Where in Time Is Carmen Sandiego? which ran from 1996 to 1997, winning one Daytime Emmy Award. During the run of the World game show, Broderbund had released Space and Junior Detective (based on the animated TV series), and planned on rebooting their most popular titles for a new generation; this resulted in the release of Where in the U.S.A. Is Carmen Sandiego? (1996), Where in the World Is Carmen Sandiego? (1996), and Time (1997). While USA and World became inspired by the World game show, many elements of the Time game show became incorporated into Time, including the theme song (performed by its vocal group The Engine Crew), the names of many of its villains, and the ACME Timenet headquarters (a parody of World's ACME Crimenet). In each of these three titles, Thigpen assigned cases to the player through live-action video clips in her reprised role as Chief. Throughout Time's two seasons, these video games were often given to players as prizes for winning. Clear Ink won the contract to create a website for Carmen Sandiego, which was released in line with the shipping of Time and Word. Kenneth Goldstein, who joined Broderbund in 1992 to "strengthen" the Carmen Sandiego series, was executive producer for the game. The game "supports the National Curriculum".

=== Development ===
By 1995, Where In The World Is Carmen Sandiego, the first television series based on the franchise, had been airing for five years. The show's producers at PBS decided it was time to "evolve the brand and put something new in front of their audience" that "carried over the core values of the original". Despite Broderbund having meetings to convince the producers to continue World due to its success, they persisted with their creation of a Where in Time spiritual sequel. At the time, Broderbund were putting Where in Time is Carmen Sandiego? into development as a CD-ROM game with a "completely new play paradigm" designed by Broderbund employee Jim Everson. Jim's vision was for Carmen Sandiego to transition into sequential adventure games interspersed with narrative-driven cut scenes. Broderbund put together a prototype based on this vision and showed it to PBS; they also noted a plan to include World cast member Lynne Thigpen as The Chief to introduce and summarize the cases. PBS loved the pitch and agreed to the use of their character, allowing for cross-platform synergy of the franchise.

Good Guide Ann Tickwitee's appearance in the demo of the game (left). She was redesigned into an Asian-American character for the finished version (right).

While Broderbund had previous experience with point-and-click titles with the 1993 video game Myst, Time was the first game of the genre that was part of the Carmen Sandiego franchise. Breaking away from the 'clues to next location' style of gameplay, the developers chose a graphic adventure game, in which each case took place in one historical setting. This allows the player to experience the culture of each period, "learn[ing] about the history of the people, events and life conditions of the time", rather than simply obtaining a clue then traveling elsewhere. The game bears only cosmetic resemblance to the 1989 game of the same name, the latter uses the time-traveling Chronoskimmer, the theft of historical objects by Carmen's crooks, and a form of pun-based humor present in most games in the series. This game was often subtitled v3.0 as it was made in the same style and production batch as World 3.0 and USA 3.0 which are the third versions of their games. While there was an Enhanced version of Time, it never received a remake in the Deluxe v2.0 style as did World and USA. Both versions of Time share a name though the game play is different. In Where in Time is Carmen Sandiego, the developers were able to incorporate QuickTime video of The Chief. At the time, Lynne Thigpen was playing The Chief on the television series as well. She flew out to San Francisco and recorded her parts in the Broderbund studio. Her presence allowed the developers to have streaming video of TV quality and a well-known actress in their game.

Though the company had experimented with other subject matter in previous Carmen Sandiego games, to many critics this title, along with Carmen Sandiego Word Detective (1997) and Carmen Sandiego Math Detective (1998), marked the franchise's debut in subjects other than geography. The Buffalo News said, "instead of world facts, they aim to teach lessons about history and word usage", adding that the transition was a "smooth one". The Providence Journal Bulletin wrote: "Broderbund's Where In Time is Carmen Sandiego and Carmen Sandiego Word Detective continue the great tradition of the original Carmen, expanding into [history] and language". The Christian Science Monitor wrote: "Now Carmen has taken her criminal activities beyond geography and into the realms of history, math, and the language arts", and argued that Time was "the most closely related to the series' prototype". Closed-captioned CD-ROMs were virtually non-existent by 1996 and there wasn't an organized effort to encourage multimedia companies to provide subtitles for plot-intensive products; Great Chase Through Time broke the mould by including a closed captioning option.

The straightforward question-answer puzzle game Carmen Sandiego's ThinkQuick Challenge (1999) was the final game to be developed by Broderbund; the company was acquired by the Learning Company in 1998, and on June 1, 1999, re-released Time with a minimal redesign and a name change from Where in Time Is Carmen Sandiego? to Carmen Sandiego's Great Chase Through Time.

=== Design ===
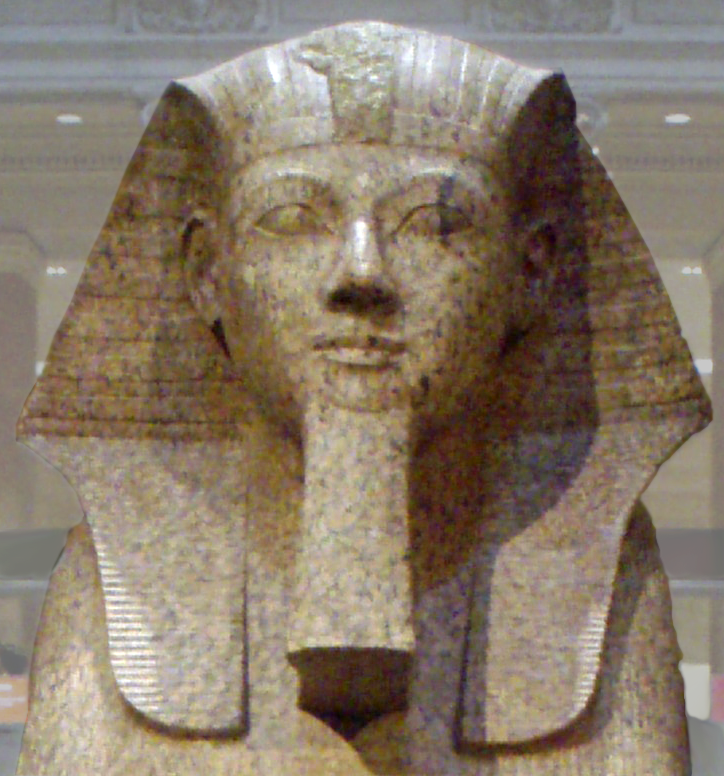
Large granite sphinx bearing the likeness of the pharaoh Hatshepsut, depicted with the traditional false beard, a symbol of her pharaonic power — Metropolitan Museum of Art

The character animation was done independently of the background design, and they were layered on the same screen after each element was produced. This allowed the same character animation to be placed in multiple backgrounds. For example, Sacagawea appears in both the opening and final scenes of Case 15 in an identical physical stance. Broderbund was very efficient with its workflow, having an assembly line system. The company's plan was to keep the look consistent throughout. Instead of putting each artist in charge of both design layout and painting, the tasks were given to two separate work streams, done by two separate groups of artists with different skill sets. Approximately two to three artists painted the backgrounds for the game, which began as prototype backgrounds before being colored in. The same system applied with the color models for animated characters. A full-time onsite employee came up with the look and feel of the design while freelance artists were hired to fulfill the vision. Layout artists were required to complete animation on top of static images. Many of those who worked on this game also contributed to World, U.S.A. and Word. Much of the design work took place between 1996 and 1997. The opening, closing, and jailbreak sequences required special attention to ensure they were aesthetically impressive and told a succinctly visual narrative. In mid-1997, the three cut-scene sequences had to be painted over to give them a 3D effect which matched the backgrounds of the game levels. The freelance artists used Photoshop, and instead of using tools such as Wacom tablets or handheld styluses, they painted with a mouse and developed painting techniques as they went. E.g. to give trees a "leafy look", an improvised technique was to "ha[ve] the mouse fade after two to three pixels [for] several strokes".

Though the game was "carefully constructed to be fun and factual", in some cases the historical accuracy was sidestepped in favor of ease of gameplay, creating fun puzzles, and increasing visual clarity. The siege in Case 5 is entirely fictional and is a direct result of Carmen's crook stealing the Domesday Book, resulting in a perceived weakness in William's leadership and a rebellion to overthrow him. In addition, while efforts were made to convey historically accurate scenarios, they could only do so based on the available evidence from which they sometimes extrapolated. In situations where the truth is unknown, certain viewpoints were chosen. For example, while there is no evidence that Hatshepsut wore a false beard, she is often depicted wearing one in statues and hieroglyphs and the game's designers decided to include this "intriguing, if debatable, element". Often, the designers created simplified versions of long and complex concepts in order to reduce confusion and make cases shorter. Examples include the mummy-making process in Case 1, the feudal political system presented in Case 5, the sign language of the Plains and Rocky mountain regions in Case 15, and the Vostok rocket parts involved in Yuri Gagarin's spaceflight in Case 18. Also, modern titles were used in favour of contemporary ones in the case of "Pharaoh" for Hatshepsut, "Inca" for the Incan civilization itself, and "Edison" for Thomas Alva Edison. Similarly, a choice was made for every character to speak English instead of using subtitles for the sake of simplicity, even in time periods or locations where English was unknown or was not the local language.

=== Release ===
Interviewing Matt Fishbach, Associate Designer at Broderbund Software in January 1997, fansite The Sandiego Manor asked: "Are there going to be updated versions of Where in Time or America's Past?" (in response to the then-recent reboots of Where in the World? and Where in the USA?). He replied: "Quite likely. Look for an announcement at the upcoming Toy Fair event in NYC (in March, I believe)". The following month, on February 10, Broderbund released a press release explaining they would reveal the game at that year's Toy Fair, and it would be released in stores that fall. Where in Time is Carmen Sandiego? was unveiled at the Toy Fair in New York City by Broderbund later that year. Business Wire noted at the time that "the announcement of this new software title takes place on the heels of the recent releases of Where in the World is Carmen Sandiego? and Where in the USA is Carmen Sandiego?, both top five software titles this past holiday, and the successful launch of the new Where in Time is Carmen Sandiego? PBS game show for kids". Where in Time is Carmen Sandiego? was eventually released on August 13, 1997.

Broderbund Software's marketing strategy aimed at a target demographic: "young parents who have a computer at home and want their kids to learn while playing". To do this, it created edutainment titles with "entertaining graphics and sound", beta-tested them with kids to ensure they were easy to use, and made deals with retailers like Best Buy and Babbages. An MHHE document entitled Marketing's Role within the Firm or Nonprofit Organization explained that "retailers are happy to give new Broderbund products shelf space because they know that Broderbund's promotion will help bring customers into the store". In the case of Great Chase Through Time, Broderbund "not only placed ads in family-oriented computer magazines but also sent direct-mail flyers to its registered customers". Due to brand loyalty, Carmen Sandiego games were able to be sold for more money than software from other companies. Parents appreciated that it "cater[ed] to their needs and offer[ed] good customer value". The Mirror held a promotion where they would give away 10 copies of the video game through The A List. The game was included in the TLC School Alliance, which saw its titles being sold at discount at the NSBA Conference in Nashville and the California CUE Conference in Santa Clara. James Lyband Jackson, Computer Education Coordinator for both the YWCA/Day Care and the Church, included the "hands-on history" program as part of their education program. The School Edition of the game came with a three-ring binder to hold the software, a User's Guide, a custom-developed Teacher's Guide, and the resource book World History Simulations by Max W. Fischer.

=== Post-release ===
The game was released on two CD-ROMs, though later re-releases by The Learning Company had the game on one DVD-ROM with a dual layer, supplied with a 36-page instruction manual. This re-release came when the Learning Company changed the game's title to Carmen Sandiego's Great Chase Through Time after acquiring Broderbund's properties. As part of the Carmen Sandiego Social Studies Library, a School Edition of the game "came packaged in a sturdy three-ring binder that holds the software, User's Guide, a custom-developed Teacher's Guide, and the bonus resource book, World History Simulations by Max W. Fischer". The Carmen Sandiego site explained: "Developed specifically to help you integrate the program into your classroom curriculum, the School Edition is loaded with lesson plans, reproducible student pages, bibliographies, and many other classroom resources".

== Critical reception ==
Reception

Review scores
Publication	Score
AllGame	4.5/5
Learning Village	4.4/5
Parenting	A
USA Today	4/5
Software Informer	3/5

Awards
Publication	Award
Codie award	1998 - Best Curriculum Software for Middle Schools
1st Interactive Achievement Awards (AIAS)	1998 - PC Edutainment Title of the Year

=== Historical learning ===
While the structure of the earlier games has been criticized by the paper The Child and the Machine: How Computers Put Our Children's Education at Risk for having historical people and places "pop up as isolated phenomena that are discarded as soon as they have served their purposes", this new version was often praised for adding context and a framework to absorb their learning. The Learning Village noted that by carefully listening to the story, the player exposes themselves to a variety of interesting historical events and periods, commenting that the historical content was accurate and clearly written. MacWorld noted "the game only skims the surface of most cultures, concentrating on a few select narrow aspects"; alternatively, Advocate deemed the video game "right on target". Anne Reeks of Parenting wrote the game delivers "bits of the era's culture, achievements, government, and technology". KidsWorld magazine noted that "you don't have to know a lot of history to enjoy this game, and there's an electronic reference book for help". Great Chase Through Time was cited by Mary E. Hocks in her journal article "Feminist Interventions in Electronic Environments" as an example of a Carmen Sandiego game which "included educational information in a gender-neutral way and portrayed strong, intelligent women characters" such as the African-American Chief and the Hispanic Carmen Sandiego.

Kids appreciated that students could go to the Carmen Sandiego website for more in-depth learning into the time periods they experienced. Robin Ray of the Boston Herald wrote that the game "manages to bring the educational features inside the game itself", prompting children to learn in order to solve puzzles and complete the game, "never heavy-handed or off-putting [and] just part of the fun". Debbie Maria Leon of the New Straits Times said that "there's so much to learn in this ... fun, upbeat edutainment title" and that "each case is unique and challenging and offers a wealth of knowledge". ICT and Literacy said that "genuine historical clues are hidden in each screen and that each of the 18 cases is designed to be a "discrete historical source for an area of learning", additionally noting that the Chronopedia can "familiarize children with techniques necessary to use non-fiction CD-ROMs". The Sydney Morning Herald noted that "Asian and Australian history is all but neglected".

=== Deductive learning ===
The Learning Village noted that the game allows players to use their initiative and encourages them to investigate and think, commenting that the sleuthing aspects were "extremely well constructed, weaving together very cleverly the story telling, solving the challenge and uncovering the clues to find the thief". Anne Reeks of Parenting wrote that "each mission delivers wit-sharpening riddles". Elizabeth Hurley of USA Today commented that "the beauty of this program is that it's not just a history lesson, but a lesson in thinking", noting that it "has taken the boredom out of learning". FamilyPC said that their 66 testers most enjoyed the "thrill of the hunt and the knowledge they picked up along the way". Debbie Maria Leon of the New Straits Times thought "the high level of interactivity makes [the game] very engaging" and advised players not to "rush through the game [as] the thrill is in exploring for clues and making sense of them". ICT and Literacy noted that "satisfaction comes from detective work, mixed with chases, talking to historical and fictional figures", using skills such as problem-solving, deduction, research, decision-making, memorization, and hand-eye coordination must be used by the player, adding that finding the "baddie" and preventing the "historical disaster" is the reward for the player's efforts. The New York Times said that the game's mysteries were more plausible than those of the "conventional" Carmen Sandiego Math Detective.

=== Audiovisuals and design ===
Games Domain Review wrote that the game was enjoyable due to its humorous characters and lush graphics. Lisa Karen Savignano of Allgame noted the occasional goofiness and out-of-syncness, though acknowledged these problems didn't detract from the overall game. Meanwhile, the Milwaukee Journal Sentinel thought the game was lively without being too cutesy. Robin Ray of the Boston Herald wrote that the rebooted version of the game "corrects the faults of the earlier version and adds a lot of great new features". Kristie Rohwedder of Bustle ranked the game's instrumental theme sixth on a list of the best Carmen Sandiego songs. A negative assessment came from the book Telling Children about the Past: An Interdisciplinary Perspective, which suggested it was possible that the game's use of cartoons and stylized graphics were "projecting modern biases to the past and distorting it". Mitch Gitman of the Pittsburgh Post-Gazette reviewed Carmen Sandiego's Great Chase Through Time, together with Carmen Sandiego Math Detective and Carmen Sandiego Word Detective, and said Time was the "smartest creative move [out] of the three new products", and that "the production value, with cinematic music and quality animation" makes Time all the more deep, and described it "[much more] ingenious and innovative" than either Word or Math". ICT and Literacy explains that the series "mak[es] history accessible to a wide audience" and that the game "fuses fiction with non-fiction in a sophisticated design". Debbie Maria Leon of the New Straits Times enjoyed the "myriad of clickable items are lurking in every scene, waiting to unleash just some more interesting and intriguing information". The Cedar Rapids Gazette noted the game is "packed with that same wry humor and word play of previous Carmen games". Home PC noted that the only downside of this "much improved" Where in Time is Carmen Sandiego? game was that it was a one-time play due to clues not being random and the mystery in each era remaining the same.

=== Difficulty and The Chief ===
The Learning Village felt the game "can be just as engaging for the parent to experience as for the child". Anne Reeks of Parenting thought the experience was "unlike earlier Carmen escapades, which dragged on". Kiplinger's Personal Finance noted the game's challenging nature and that it stumped several children who tested the game. The Milwaukee Journal Sentinel described Carmen Sandiego's Great Chase Through Time as "entertaining [and] challenging for their target age groups". Savignano wrote that the game is challenging but not particularly difficult, and that "some hints [and solutions to puzzles] are included with the manual [and] at the website". Karen Campbell of The Christian Science Monitor wrote: "There's a bit of trial and error involved when clues are not immediately apparent. It can get tedious for adults, but children, for whom the tactic is a natural part of learning, don't seem to mind". Telling Children about the Past: An Interdisciplinary Perspective noted the game's accessibility for those with disabilities by offering a hearing impaired assistance setting.

David Colker of the Los Angeles Times enjoyed the "on-screen presence of actress Lynne Thigpen", noting she brought "a winning presence to her role". Debbie Maria Leon of the New Straits Times wrote that "the urgency of the [confident Chief's] voice [gives] enough oomph to make [the player] go scurrying to restore history". Alternatively, Providence Journal - Bulletin wrote that "there's a lot to learn along the way, but we spent a lot of time sitting through overblown speeches from the chief especially when we would rather have gotten on with it". Telling Children about the Past: An Interdisciplinary Perspective noted the game's defiance of stereotypes, featuring a leader who is female and black.
