= Jacqueline Hyde =

Jacqueline Hyde may refer to:

- Jacqueline Hyde, a fictional character in the game show Where in Time Is Carmen Sandiego?
- Jacklyn Hyde (fl. 2000s), an American wrestler in Women of Wrestling matches
- Jacquelyn Hyde (1931-1992), American actress

See also:

- "Jekyll and Hyde", story a.k.a. "Strange Case of Dr Jekyll and Mr Hyde"
