= The Trail of Time =

The Trail of Time may refer to:

- The Trail of Time, the bonus round from the educational game show Where in Time Is Carmen Sandiego?
- Trail of Time, an outdoor geology exhibit and nature trail on the South Rim of Grand Canyon National Park
