= An American Daughter (film) =

- Genre: Drama
- Based on: An American Daughter by Wendy Wasserstein
- Written by: Wendy Wasserstein
- Directed by: Sheldon Larry
- Starring: Christine Lahti; Tom Skerritt; Jay Thomas; Mark Feuerstein; Stanley Anderson; Blake Lindsley; Scott Michael Campbell; Matt Weinberg; Will Rothhaar; Caroline Aaron; Teri Austin; Karen Kim; Cynthia Harris; Lynne Thigpen
- Theme music composer: Phil Marshall
- Country of origin: United States
- Original language: English

Production
- Executive producers: Abby Adams; Chad S. Hoffman; Robert Schwartz; Wendy Wasserstein
- Production location: Los Angeles
- Cinematography: Albert J. Dunk
- Editor: Charles Bornstein
- Running time: 91 min.
- Production companies: Gleneagle Productions; Hearst Entertainment Productions

Original release
- Network: Lifetime
- Release: June 5, 2000

An American Daughter (also known as Trial by Media) is a 2000 Lifetime Television film directed by Sheldon Larry. The teleplay was written by Wendy Wasserstein, based on her 1997 play of the same name.

== Plot ==
Dr. Lyssa Dent Hughes (Lahti) is the daughter of U.S. Senator Alan Hughes (Stanley Anderson). She appears to be headed for nomination as the U.S. Surgeon General until a background check reveals she once neglected to return a jury duty notice. Then, she makes a faux pas in comments about her homemaker mother that leaves her open to a media blitz and her certain nomination suddenly appears to be in doubt. She is supported by her best friend, Judith Kaufman (Lynne Thigpen), an African American Jewish feminist and physician, who has her own set of troubles.

== Cast ==
- Christine Lahti as Lyssa Dent Hughes
- Tom Skerritt as Walter Abrahmson
- Jay Thomas as Timber Tucker
- Mark Feuerstein as Morrow McCarthy
- Lynne Thigpen as Dr. Judith Kaufman
- Stanley Anderson as Sen. Alan Hughes
- Blake Lindsley as Quincy Quince
- Scott Michael Campbell as Billy Robbins
- Matt Weinberg as Nicholas
- Will Rothhaar as Kip
- Caroline Aaron as Veronica
- Teri Austin as Greta
- Karen Kim as Hope
- Cynthia Harris as Charlotte "Chubby" Hughes

== Production ==
The made-for-TV film was broadcast on the Lifetime network in June 2000. The TV film is based on Wasserstein's play of the same title, An American Daughter, which ran on Broadway in 1997.

== Critical response ==
The Variety reviewer noted that the "screenplay is much more than an exploration into the mutual adulation of and animosity toward powerful women. It’s also a provocative look at the complex issues that converge when the definition of roles, be they gender or political, are called into question."

== Awards and nominations ==
Golden Globe Awards

- Best Actress - Miniseries or Television Film (Lahti, nominated)
