= Carmen Sandiego (disambiguation) =

Carmen Sandiego is a media franchise based on a video game series.

Carmen Sandiego may also refer to:

- Carmen Sandiego (video game series), a video game series in the media franchise
  - Carmen Sandiego (video game), a 2025 video game
- Carmen Sandiego (character), a fictional character in the media franchise
- Carmen Sandiego (TV series), an animated television series based in the media franchise

== See also ==
- Where in the U.S.A. Is Carmen Sandiego? (disambiguation)
- Where in the World Is Carmen Sandiego? (disambiguation)
- Where in Time Is Carmen Sandiego? (disambiguation)
