= Where in the U.S.A. Is Carmen Sandiego? (1996 video game) =

1996 video game

- The former box cover artwork of the game. It was redesigned when Broderbund was sold to The Learning Company in 1999.
- Developer(s): Broderbund
- Publisher(s): Broderbund
- Series: Carmen Sandiego
- Platform(s): Windows, Mac OS
- Release: 1996
- Genre(s): Educational
- Mode(s): Single-player

The remake of Where in the U.S.A. Is Carmen Sandiego? was released in 1996 by Windows and Macintosh and features Lynne Thigpen playing "The Chief" from the World game show. The game's opening credits finds Carmen Sandiego arriving in her underground V.I.L.E. outpost in Washington, D.C., as she and RoboCrook plan to steal America's greatest treasure from each of the 50 states. Carmen later contacts each of her 39 V.I.L.E. operatives telling them to begin their missions.

The Deluxe Edition released in 1998 (also sometimes subtitled as "version 3.5") added an "ACME Global Language Link-Up" satellite which quizzed the user on facts about the current state they were visiting.

== Gameplay ==
After receiving enough clues to where the thief went, the player may choose the next location on the map and travel to the next state.

Unlike in the previous games, the image of the locations took up most of the screen, with the game options only taking up the bottom third of the screen. Each location had an elaborately painted backdrop that could be scrolled around a full three hundred and sixty degrees. Each location provided clues in the form of several bystanders and scraps of paper lying on the ground. The scraps of paper exclusively provided clues about the suspect's appearance. An energy meter at the bottom of the screen steadily diminishes as the player travels between states, speaks with bystanders, and obtains a warrant. If the meter is completely emptied, the case ends in failure.

The user is not given dossiers describing the members of V.I.L.E. and that all the clues given about the suspect are physical traits (gender, hair color, height, weight, and accessory) enabling the user to identify the crook on sight. This means that the user will have to compile a full warrant rather than one of just enough traits to distinguish which crook is responsible. In the final destination, the crook is seen walking around the location with several innocent bystanders, meaning the user will have to use the warrant to identify which person is the criminal.

After capturing all of Carmen's crooks and completing her secret message, the player gets the chance to capture Carmen herself as the game's final mission. Failure will result in her breaking three of her crooks out of prison, whom the player must recapture before they can go after Carmen again.

== Characters and animation ==
Lynne Thigpen appears in various cutscenes as The Chief of ACME, reprising her role from the game shows Where in the World Is Carmen Sandiego? and Where in Time Is Carmen Sandiego? An added feature is the ACME Good Guides, a group of colorful characters who, if called upon, provide information about the United States. If the user calls an ACME Good Guide during a case, that guide will call back later to inform the user whether or not their warrant has any errors. If the user wishes to take tours with the Good Guides and travel to states without the inconvenience of having to track a crook, "explorer mode" is available. Finally, the Good Guides are responsible for arresting the V.I.L.E. villains once the player identifies them.

The animation in the game closely imitated the look of traditional animated cartoons. The animations that alert the user that the correct destination has been reached featured either Carmine the cat from Junior Detective Edition, a pair of bumbling janitors named Rick and Nick ICK, or RoboCrook. These animations, as well as the animations that depicted the arrest of the crooks, featured much use of cartoon physics (with cartoon sound effects). Ivan Idea will summon his floating orb that sprouts a large glove that flattens the crook; Herman Nootix will literally throw his book at the crook to trip them; Dee Plomasy will trap the crook with her turban; Renee Santz will play her saxophone, where musical notes will trip and pin the crook; Rock Solid will toss his tree and hit it with his axe, causing the tree to split into several logs that surround the crook; Ann Tickwittee touches her magic lamp to summon a Genie to capture the crook while they are laughing in disbelief; and Kim Yoonity will give the crook her balloon that causes them to float up, after which Kim uses a blowgun to pop the balloon and cause the crook to come crashing down.

== Critical reception ==
A review by William T. Yates for the website WorldVillage Software Reviews on March 9, 2005 praised the game. The review concluded with "the whole package is well-designed and constructed. The graphics are good as is the sound. And there is no shortage of content, both educational and recreational. In fact, it's hard to differentiate between the two. Broderbund has done an excellent job and provides you with excellent value". The game was given a rating of 5 globes.

Allgame said the game "represents a huge leap forward in the Carmen Sandiego series" as it is the first one "presented in more of a graphical format", as opposed to the older games which were largely text-based. It gave the game a rating of 4 stars out of 5.

A review of the game Where in the USA Is Carmen Sandiego? off TopTenREVIEWS summarised by saying: "The interesting facts that are included in Where in the USA Is Carmen Sandiego? are fun and educational for the whole family. It has long since been a favorite of geography students. The software is quite old, but still playable with the right operating system". Whilst stating that "this program specializes in USA facts and material", it continued to say that "it does not have materials for the entire globe". The verdict was that "this is a good product with a lot of great facts about the United States". The game was given an overall rating of 2.5/4 stars.

== Where in the USA is Carmen Sandiego? School Version ==
In 2004, Houghton Mifflin Harcourt released a school edition of this game. The new version included "the "State-A-Base", an electronic database filled with essays, maps, music, color photos, and video clips that can be searched by key word", although using the search engine function drained the energy meter. Also, all the data within the program was updated to 2004; the game could be supported on Windows XP, Windows 2000 and Mac OS X; 50 printable state outline maps were provided, which could be used in classrooms; and a Full Install Option which allowed teachers install and run the software without the CD. The "Teacher's Resource CD-ROM" included a comprehensive user's guide, 19 lesson plans, tutorials, blackline masters, and an annotated bibliography of resources.
