= Lynne Thigpen =

American actress (1948–2003)

- Thigpen as Miss Barrett in the 1989 film Lean on Me
- Born: Cherlynne Theresa Thigpen; December 22, 1948; Joliet, Illinois, U.S.
- Died: March 12, 2003 (aged 54); Marina del Rey, California, U.S.
- Resting place: Elmhurst Cemetery, Joliet, Illinois
- Other name: Lynne Richmond
- Education: University of Illinois at Urbana–Champaign
- Occupation: Actress
- Years active: 1971–2003
- Television: The Chief in (Where in the World Is Carmen Sandiego?)
- Awards: 1992 Obie Award – (Boesman and Lena); 1997 Tony Award for Best Featured Actress in a Play – (An American Daughter); 1999 Obie Award – (Jar the Floor)

Cherlynne Theresa Thigpen (December 22, 1948 – March 12, 2003) was an American actress of stage and screen. She was known for her role as the Chief of ACME Crimenet in the game show Where in the World Is Carmen Sandiego? and various spinoffs, and for her role as Luna the Moon in the Playhouse Disney children's series Bear in the Big Blue House. For her varied television work, Thigpen was nominated for six Daytime Emmy Awards. She won a Tony Award in 1997 for portraying Dr. Judith Kaufman in An American Daughter, and also played Ella Farmer on The District (2000–2003). Thigpen first gained attention for her role in the 1971 off-Broadway musical Godspell. Thigpen's character is named Lynne, and she sang "O Bless the Lord, My Soul" in the musical. Thigpen reprised her role as Lynne in the 1973 film adaptation, which she starred in alongside David Haskell and Victor Garber.

== Early life and education ==
Thigpen was born in the Chicago suburb of Joliet, Illinois, to George and Celia (Martin) Thigpen. She obtained a degree in teaching. She taught high school English briefly while studying theatre at the University of Illinois on an acting fellowship.

== Career ==
=== Stage ===
Thigpen moved to New York City in 1971 to begin her career as a stage actress. She appeared in numerous musicals including Godspell, The Night That Made America Famous, The Magic Show, Working, Tintypes, and An American Daughter (for which she won her Tony Award for her portrayal of Dr. Judith Kaufman in 1997).

In 1994, Thigpen originated a role in an Adrienne Kennedy short play Motherhood 2000, while in 1995, she served as associate artistic director of the acclaimed off-Broadway theater, Circle Repertory Company, while Austin Pendleton served as artistic director.

=== Film ===
Her first feature film role was as Lynne in Godspell (1973), co-starring opposite Victor Garber and David Haskell. Thigpen also portrayed a radio DJ (shown only from the nose down) in Walter Hill's The Warriors (1979), and Leonna Barrett, the mother of an expelled student, in Lean on Me (1989), the story of American high school principal Joe Louis Clark. She had a role in the remake of Shaft (2000) as the mother of a murder victim, and played the Second President of the World Congress in Bicentennial Man (1999). Her last film, Anger Management (2003), starring Adam Sandler and Jack Nicholson, was released a month after her death and paid tribute to her in the end credits.

=== Television ===
Thigpen was most known to television audiences for playing the Chief in the PBS children's geography game show Where in the World Is Carmen Sandiego?, which involved education, humor, and an occasional musical performance. She also reprised her role as The Chief in the successor show Where in Time is Carmen Sandiego? She also played Luna in the television show Bear in the Big Blue House and also appeared in many other television series during her career, most notably in a recurring role as Grace Keefer on the ABC daytime drama All My Children and a supporting role as Ella Mae Farmer, a crime analyst for the Washington, D.C., police department, on the CBS crime drama The District. She guest-starred in episodes of Gimme a Break!, Roseanne, Thirtysomething, The Cosby Show, L.A. Law, Law & Order, The Days and Nights of Molly Dodd, Homicide: Life on the Street, and Sesame Street, and was a regular cast member on the NBC sketch comedy series The News Is the News.

=== Audio productions ===
She appeared in radio skits of the Garrison Keillor program The American Radio Company of the Air. Her voice was also heard on over 20 audio books, primarily works with socially relevant themes.

=== Computer games ===
In her association with the Where in the World Is Carmen Sandiego? television show, Thigpen reprised her role as The Chief in three related computer games. Two were released in 1996: Where in the World Is Carmen Sandiego? (a reboot of the original 1985–1992 game) and Where in the U.S.A. Is Carmen Sandiego? The following year, a video game counterpart to the TV series' successor show, Where in Time is Carmen Sandiego, was released, titled Carmen Sandiego's Great Chase Through Time. Thigpen recorded hundreds of QuickTime videos for cut-scenes in the games, and generally received praise for her performances in them; in reviewing the 1997 game, David Colker of the Los Angeles Times enjoyed the "on-screen presence of actress Lynne Thigpen", noting that she "brings a winning presence to her role," while Debbie Maria Leon of the New Straits Times wrote that "the urgency of the [confident Chief's] voice [gives] enough oomph to make [the player] go scurrying to restore history".

== Death ==
Thigpen died of a cerebral hemorrhage on March 12, 2003, in her Marina del Rey, California, home, outside of Los Angeles, at the age of 54, after complaining of headaches for several days. The coroner's autopsy found "acute cardiac dysfunction, non-traumatic systemic and spontaneous intraventricular hemorrhage, and hemorrhage in the brain." Thigpen was entombed at Elmhurst Cemetery in her hometown of Joliet, Illinois.

=== Response and legacy ===
Following Thigpen's death, the remaining three episodes of the third season of The District killed off her character, Ella Mae Farmer.

Thigpen's family and friends established a non-profit foundation, The Lynne Thigpen–Bobo Lewis Foundation, to help young actors and actresses learn to survive and succeed in New York theater and to mentor the next generation of Broadway stars.

Thigpen was posthumously nominated for a Daytime Emmy Award for Outstanding Performer in Children's Programming for voicing Luna the moon in Bear in the Big Blue House, but lost to Jeff Corwin for his eponymous wildlife reality series The Jeff Corwin Experience. Her final film, Anger Management, was dedicated to her memory. An elementary school in Thigpen's hometown of Joliet, Illinois, was named after her.

== Filmography ==
=== Film ===
Year	Title	Role	Notes
1973	Godspell	Lynne	
1979	The Warriors	DJ	
1982	Tootsie	Jo	
1984	Streets of Fire	Subway Motorwoman	
1985	Walls of Glass	Woman Cop	
1986	Sweet Liberty	Claire	
1987	Hello Again	Reporter #2	
1988	Running on Empty	Contact at Eldridge St.	
1989	Lean on Me	Leonna Barrett	
1990	Impulse	Dr. Gardner	
1992	Article 99	Nurse White	
1992	Bob Roberts	Kelly Noble	
1993	Naked in New York	Helen	
1994	The Paper	Janet	
1994	Blankman	Grandma Walker	
1995	Just Cause	Ida Conklin	
1999	Random Hearts	Phyllis Bonaparte	
1999	The Insider	Mrs. Williams	
1999	Bicentennial Man	President Marjorie Bota	
2000	Shaft	Carla Howard	
2001	Novocaine	Pat	
2003	Anger Management	Judge Brenda Daniels	Posthumous release; dedicated in memory

=== Television ===
Year	Title	Role	Notes
1972	Fol-de-Rol	Witch / Ensemble	Television film
1981	Lou Grant	Mrs. Dupree	1 episode
1983	Love, Sidney	Nancy	1 episode
1985–1986	Gimme a Break!	Loretta Harper	3 episodes
1986	Rockabye	Rica Towne	Television film
1986	Spenser: For Hire	Mrs. Jarvis	1 episode
1987	The Ellen Burstyn Show	Pam James	1 episode
1987	The Equalizer	Cleaning Lady	Episode: "Blood and Wine"
1988	Frank's Place	Madame Torchet	1 episode
1989	Roseanne	Dr. Bryce	1 episode
1989	Thirtysomething	Rosie	Recurring role, 6 episodes
1989	Fear Stalk	Barbara	Television film
1989–1990	FM	Naomi Sayers	Main role, 13 episodes
1989–1993	ABC Afterschool Specials	Mrs. Meeks / Jo Delancey	2 episodes
1990	Hunter	Lt. Marilyn Fowler	1 episode
1991	The Days and Nights of Molly Dodd	Nate's Cousin	1 episode
1991	Dear John	Sarah Donnelly	1 episode
1991	Separate but Equal	Ruth Alice Stovall	2 episodes
1991	The Cosby Show	Mrs. Hudson	2 episodes
1991–1995	Where in the World Is Carmen Sandiego?	The Chief	Main role, 296 episodes
1991–1992	L.A. Law	D.A. Ruby Thomas	Recurring role, 10 episodes
1992	Loving	Judge Hale	2 episodes
1993–2000	All My Children	Grace Keefer	Recurring role
1995–1999	Law & Order	Trial Judge Ida Boucher	3 episodes
1995	Cagney & Lacey: The View Through the Glass Ceiling	Capt. Gigi Cardenas	Television film
1995	The Puzzle Place	The Chief	Episode: "The Mystery of the Fabulous Hat"
1996	The Boys Next Door	Mrs. Tracy	Television film
1996	A Mother's Instinct	"Mike" Wheelwright	Television film
1996–1997	Where in Time Is Carmen Sandiego?	The Chief	115 episodes
1997–2003	Bear in the Big Blue House	Luna	Voice role, 103 episodes
1997	Homicide: Life on the Street	Regina Wilson	3 episodes
1997	Promised Land	Dr. Bea Goldman	1 episode
1997	King of the Hill	Judge	Voice role, episode: "Hank's Dirty Laundry"
1998	Sesame Street	WASA Training Officer	2 episodes
1998	Cosby	Linda / Dr. Holmes	2 episodes
1998–2003	Where in the Universe Is Carmen Sandiego?	The Chief	Unknown episodes
1999	Night Ride Home	Fran	Television film
2000	An American Daughter	Dr. Judith B. Kaufman	Television film
2000–2003	The District	Ella Farmer	Main role, 66 episodes

=== Stage ===
Year	Title	Role	Notes
1972	Godspell	Bless the Lord	Ford's Theatre
1974	The Magic Show	Dina (Replacement)	Cort Theatre, Broadway
1975	The Night That Made America Famous	Performer	Ethel Barrymore Theatre, Broadway
1978	Working	Diane Wilson/Heather Lamb/JoAnne Robinson/Maggie Holmes	46th Street Theatre, Broadway
1979	But Never Jam Today	Persona Non Grata	Longacre Theatre, Broadway
1980	Tintypes	Performer	John Golden Theatre, Broadway
1983	Full Hookup	Joellen	Circle Repertory Company, Off-Broadway
1984	Balm in Gilead	Bonnie	Minetta Lane Theatre, Off-Broadway
1987	Fences	Rose (Replacement)	46th Street Theatre, Broadway
1987	A Month of Sundays	Mrs. Baker	Ritz Theatre, Broadway
1994	Motherhood 2000	Mother/Writer	McCarter Theatre
1992	Boesman and Lena	Lena	Manhattan Theatre Club, Off-Broadway
1996	Having Our Say	Bessie	Mark Taper Forum
1997	An American Daughter	Judith B. Kaufman	Cort Theatre, Broadway
1999	Jar The Floor	Lola	Second Stage Theater, Off-Broadway

== Awards and honors ==
Awards

- 1992 Obie Award – Boesman and Lena
- 1997 Tony Award for Best Featured Actress in a Play – An American Daughter
- 2000 Obie Award – Jar the Floor

Nominations

- 1981 Tony Award for Best Featured Actress in a Musical – Tintypes
- 1987 Los Angeles Drama Critics Award – Fences
- 1994, 1995, 1996 Daytime Emmy Awards for Outstanding Performer in a Children's Series – Where in the World Is Carmen Sandiego?
- 1996 NAACP Image Awards for Informational Youth or Children's Series/Special – Where in the World Is Carmen Sandiego?
- 1997 NAACP Image Awards for Outstanding Actress in a Daytime Drama Series – All My Children
- 1997, 1998 Daytime Emmy Awards for Outstanding Performer in a Children's Series – Where in Time Is Carmen Sandiego?
- 2000 AudioFile Awards Golden Voices for the Year
- 2004 Daytime Emmy Awards for Outstanding Performer in a Children's Series – Bear in the Big Blue House (Posthumously nominated)

Honors

- Lynne Thigpen Elementary School, Joliet, Illinois
