= Carmen Sandiego (character) =

Fictional thief

- Carmen Sandiego character
- Carmen Sandiego, as depicted in the promotions of Where in the World Is Carmen Sandiego? handheld electronic game.
- First game: Where in the World Is Carmen Sandiego? (1985)
- Created by: Gene Portwood; Dane Bigham; Lauren Elliott
- Voiced by: Various: Rita Moreno (Earth); Mari Devon (Word Detective and Math Detective); Christiane Crawford (Treasures of Knowledge and The Secret of the Stolen Drums); Gina Rodriguez (Netflix animated series); Darragh Mondoux (2025 video game)
- Portrayed by: Janine LaManna (Time; season 1); Brenda Burke (Time; season 2)

In-universe information
- Home: San Francisco, California
- Nationality: Argentinean-Mexican

Carmen Isabella Sandiego is a fictional character featured in a long-running edutainment video games series of the same name created by the American software company Broderbund. As an international lady thief, a criminal mastermind, and the elusive nemesis of the ACME Detective Agency, Carmen Sandiego is the principal character of the video game series and the head of ACME's rival organization, V.I.L.E. She is depicted as an extremely intelligent, stylish, fashionable woman whose signature look features a red, matching fedora and trenchcoat. Many of her crimes depicted in the games involve spectacular and often impossible cases of monument theft, which are used as a pretext to teach children geography via the simulated process of tracking down the character, the stolen monuments, and her accomplices all over the world.

Carmen Sandiego's authors were Gene Portwood, Lauren Elliott, and Dane Bigham. Writer David Siefkin wrote the first script of the game and invented the character's name. He left the project to become a diplomat for the U.S. State Department before the first game was released in 1985. The character's identity as a Hispanic woman has remained a consistent and integral part of her character, and visually, she was partly influenced by the Brazilian singer and actress Carmen Miranda. Her last name alludes to the city of San Diego, California. Carmen Sandiego is referred to by such epithets as The Miss of Misdemeanor, The Flimflam of Nations, Vicious & Cruel, The Queen of Crime, and The World's Greatest Thief.

== Character overview ==
There are numerous discrepancies in the various media depicting Carmen Sandiego, and no official or correct canon has been designated or established. However, the following seems to have remained consistent throughout all Carmen Sandiego media created since around the mid-1980s:

- In most Carmen Sandiego media, it is stated or implied that Carmen is a lady thief in that she steals only for the challenge of it, although some of her V.I.L.E. minions are more traditionally motivated. She often describes her schemes and the protagonists' attempts to stop them as being a game, which they ironically are, regularly gloating that she will never be captured, that her plans are infallible, and acting as though any efforts made against her are extremely trivial. Sometimes, she asserts that it is impossible for anyone to understand her motives and seems to revel at how difficult she can make it for anyone trying to figure her out.
- In the original 1985 Where in the World Is Carmen Sandiego? game, Carmen is characterized as a former spy for the Intelligence Service of Monaco and that she is "an agent, double agent, triple agent, and quadruple agent for so many countries that even she has forgotten which one she is working for," but this background seems to have since been abandoned.
- Starting with Carmen Sandiego's Great Chase Through Time (formerly Where in Time Is Carmen Sandiego?), it is explained that she was an ace detective for the ACME Detective Agency who found catching criminals too easy and decided that outsmarting ACME itself would make for greater challenges. This origin story was consistently maintained for over a decade, with one of the protagonists of Where in the World Is Carmen Sandiego? Treasures of Knowledge being Carmen's former partner.
- In both the animated TV series Where on Earth Is Carmen Sandiego? and in the video game Where in the World Is Carmen Sandiego? Treasures of Knowledge, it is heavily hinted that, despite her thieving ways, she may still have some goodness left in her. The character has, however, never been depicted turning back to the good side outright, although she has often been encouraged to do so. Nevertheless, Carmen tries to maintain a reputation as a "thief with a conscience" in the Earth series and ACME agents who used to work closely with her are often shown to have mixed feelings about imprisoning her.

== Backstory ==
In the games, ACME Headquarters is primarily located in San Francisco and the leader of ACME is called "The Chief". Carmen Sandiego was a brilliant agent for the Villains' International League of Evil (V.I.L.E.) until she left and joined ACME. V.I.L.E. seeks to commit incredible thefts and/or cause chaos in other ways, while ACME tries to thwart them and capture their agents. In the computer games, the thefts of the minor henchmen are almost always meant to keep ACME occupied before Carmen herself pulls off the real crime, usually something monumental and significant to the theme of the game. Carmen is incredibly, at times almost supernaturally, elusive and her permanent capture would be ACME's holy grail.

Carmen Sandiego was voiced by Rita Moreno in the Earth animated series. This animated television series reveals a unique backstory about Carmen Sandiego. According to the show, Carmen Sandiego was an orphan raised at the Golden Gate Girls' School in San Francisco. The Chief gave her a home at the ACME Detective Agency and, by age seventeen, she solved more cases than any other ACME agent. However, she then disappeared and turned to a life of crime. Her partner when she was at ACME was a Japanese man named Suhara, who left ACME after she did and appears to now be retired. Unlike in most of the rest of the series, the reason for Carmen leaving ACME is not specifically stated, although it is speculated on by Suhara ("Déjà Vu"). In the latter seasons of the show, Carmen began to be portrayed as more of an antivillain than a proper villainess, even teaming up with the show's protagonists to defeat criminals more unscrupulous than herself on several occasions. Additionally, it was made clear that she makes a point of refusing to steal something if the theft will cause anybody harm—a vow she frequently breaks outside this canon.

The Earth series gave the franchise a timeline, with the mid-1990s (the time the show was produced) being the present. According to this timeline, Carmen joined ACME in 1985, placing her birth in approximately 1968. Her birthday is on March 1 ("The Scavenger Hunt"). In the two-part finale, Carmen Sandiego attempts to rob millionaire Malcolm Avalon of a statue but finds a portrait of someone who she believes is her mother based on a locket she owns and sparks the possibility that Avalon might be her father. Avalon refuses to believe that she is his daughter due to her propensity of being a thief and that he believes his daughter died in a hotel fire along with her mother in San Francisco. However, later on in the episodes he accepts the possibility that she might be his daughter. Before finding out the ultimate truth, Avalon falls from a roof during a battle with former ACME agent Lee Jordan and has selective amnesia of the events that have transpired. At the end of the final episode, Carmen hires a hypnotist in order to remember what happened the day of the fire. It is discovered she picked the locket off the ground, but cannot recall if it was because she dropped it, or if she found it while the hotel was burning. The finale ends with her saying, "But maybe there are just some things we aren't meant to know for sure."

CommonSenseMedia explains:

why Carmen breaks the law at every turn, but her thefts are somehow forgivable because she does it more for the challenge and the thrill of it than for any personal gain, and her main concern is always the preservation of the artifacts. She even concerns herself with the kid detectives' well-being and is known to step in on their behalf when there's a danger.

DVDTalk determines:

Carmen, bless her heart, is a thief only in the sense of her love of a mental contest; she's not out to hurt anybody, often leaving valuables behind, and, in one episode, attempting to save Ivy from harm. The teens, then, give their brains a workout with every adventure, obviously taking great delight in solving Carmen's geography riddles.

According to the episode "Hot Ice", Carmen has been gone from ACME for 10 years, 3 months and 7 days.

Unlike in most of the rest of the franchise, the reason for Carmen leaving ACME is not specifically stated in the Earth series, although it was speculated by Suhara ("Déjà Vu"). In the episode "Hot Ice", Carmen points out she didn't have all the high-tech hardware Zack and Ivy have back when she was an ACME detective. In the episode "Retribution, Part 1" a scene shown in flashback shows how justified she was. This is further enforced in another episode, where Carmen is dared to try something without any of her high-tech equipment. She agrees to this, and actually pulls it off, hijacking the Orient Express with only conventional tools. Carmen is sometimes depicted as genuinely liking Zack and Ivy, and enjoying the ongoing battle of wits she has with them to the point where she will often congratulate the two for their successes regarding them as worthy opponents. Carmen thievery skills are highly complex as she has managed to steal the Mona Lisa's smile, technology to steal musical talent and even the entire beach of Kaimu Beach in Hawaii. Despite her nature as a thief, Carmen does have her nice moments. In one episode, Carmen eludes every ACME Detective at once, the detectives find that she has left them all a doll of herself that teases that it is the only Carmen that they'll catch, and wishes a Merry Christmas as a Christmas gift. In the episode "Trick or Treat" Zack and Ivy find Carmen's Halloween party. They see Sara Bellum handing out candy to trick-or-treaters, on Carmen's orders so her theft wasn't going to wreck the holiday for children. Although a villainess Carmen operates on her own brand of morals, such as being a thief in the strictest sense of the word and not killing Zack and Ivy despite gaining many opportunities to do so. She has even saved the Chief's life when he was suffering a viral malfunction and did not want to lose him and only had Manny "kidnap" him so she could get to play chess with him like they did every Christmas when she was an ACME agent.

The six Carmen Sandiego games produced from 1996 through 1999 (Where in the World Is Carmen Sandiego?, Where in the U.S.A. Is Carmen Sandiego?, Where in Time Is Carmen Sandiego? (Carmen Sandiego's Great Chase Through Time), Carmen Sandiego Word Detective, Carmen Sandiego Math Detective and Carmen Sandiego's ThinkQuick Challenge) seem to form a loose canon as they feature some of the same characters. However, characters as well as some other elements often appear differently between the games due to the use of different animation styles. It is only in Word Detective and Math Detective that substantial information about Carmen is given. In this universe, Carmen's partner when she was at ACME was Chase Devineaux and one of the last cases they worked on together involved the mythical "Prometheus Rock." Although Chase and Carmen apprehended the thieves responsible for stealing it, the rock itself was not found. When Carmen left ACME, Chase was forced to leave ACME as well since he had worked so closely with her. However, Chase began working with ACME again to stop Carmen's plan to steal language with the Babbel-On Machine, as depicted in Carmen Sandiego Word Detective. In Carmen Sandiego Math Detective, the whereabouts of the Prometheus Rock became all too clear when Carmen tried to use it to make herself all-powerful, although her plans were thwarted by Agent 9 (the player) and Chase. As of Carmen Sandiego's ThinkQuick Challenge, Chase is again working for ACME.

In the Carmen Sandiego Treasures of Knowledge canon, Carmen was a child prodigy, who won a substantial amount of money on a game show called It's a Wise Child (a reference to J. D. Salinger's Glass family in Franny and Zooey and many of his short stories) when she was ten years old. She used the money to travel extensively around the world until she was twelve. Her partner when she was at ACME was Jules Argent, who still works for ACME and appears to be in her early twenties. Jules specifically notes that Carmen never talked about her childhood, and aside from the mention of her winning the aforementioned game show, no details of it are given. (Where in the World Is Carmen Sandiego? Treasures of Knowledge) The game show Carmen wins may be a reference to the game shows the character herself starred in.

According to Where in Space Is Carmen Sandiego?, her favorite writer is Ursula K. Le Guin and her favorite astronomer is Nicolaus Copernicus.

In Carmen Sandiego: Junior Detective Edition, the third version of Where in the World Is Carmen Sandiego? and Where in the World Is Carmen Sandiego? Treasures of Knowledge, Carmen owns a red helicopter. In Junior Detective and in the 1996 versions of World and U.S.A., she owns a pet cat named Carmine.

In the 2019 Netflix animated series, which portrays Carmen as the hero instead of a villain, she is an orphan Argentine girl code-named "Black Sheep" who is rescued by V.I.L.E. 20 years earlier, and trained as an agent. But when she learns the organization's true goal, she turns against them and seeks to dissolve it by stealing back from them. In this series, Carmen has no personal connection to The ACME Detective Agency, but they have parallel goals in opposing V.I.L.E. and the agency pursues Carmen to investigate the agenda of her crimes which appears to have some connection to their primary enemy.

== Portrayals ==
=== Games ===
Carmen Sandiego has often been created through animation techniques in many games, either with various forms of computer graphics or traditional animation. The Time game show is the only time the character has officially been portrayed in live action, aside from photographs in early game manuals.

Carmen Sandiego's voice was heard for the first time on Where in the World Is Carmen Sandiego? Deluxe Edition during her trial after she is captured by the player. Her voice was featured regularly in the World game show, though only during the phone tap skit. She had minor personality on the World show, aside being constantly exasperated by her crooks' incompetence and showing sarcasm. No voice artist was credited; however, later performers maintained the distinctive, slightly dusky voice she was given on World.

=== Attire ===
Carmen Sandiego is almost always portrayed as a woman who often wears a red ("carmine") trench coat, a matching fedora (though often portrayed similar to a sombrero cordobés), and long brown hair, although her hair color was given to be "auburn" or "black" in some of the earlier games of the franchise. Her hat is often shown leaving her face in shadow and obscuring her eyes. When her eyes are visible, they are usually brown, although they were blue in the Earth animated series and in the Math Detective game. In many appearances, she also wears gray or black leather gloves.

In the original Broderbund games, Carmen Sandiego wore a yellow or orange dress under her trench coat, with a matching stripe on her fedora, and red high-heeled shoes (best recognized in this outfit). She also seemed to have a flair for elegance, being described in the classic 1985 video game as having "jewelry" as a feature and in its accompanying manual as wearing a famous necklace known as the "Moon of Moldavia". In the later games developed under The Learning Company and Houghton Mifflin Harcourt, the character's appearance was rebooted so that she wore a grayish black catsuit under her trench coat, with the stripe on her fedora changed to match, and more practical footwear.

In the canon depicted in the Earth animated television series, her hair is black, rather than the usual brown, as are her normally gray gloves. Her hat band on Earth is orange, matching a turtle neck and skirt she wears under her trench coat in this series. Frances Martel of The Mary Sue described her as having a "keen but conservative fashion sense". In the Netflix animated series, she wears a black jumpsuit under her trench coat and a black stripe on her hat, as well as a choker with a triangle pendant, although she briefly wore the classic design in the second episode. She has olive skin, auburn hair, and grey eyes.

=== Animation ===
In the Earth animated series, Carmen Sandiego also had a much larger role and was voiced by actress Rita Moreno. Moreno would later voice Carmen for the game Junior Detective and the planetarium film Universe. In the games Word Detective and Math Detective, Mari Devon took on the title role. More recently, her voice was provided by Christiane Crawford for Treasures of Knowledge and The Secret of the Stolen Drums. On Time, Carmen Sandiego also had little personality and was generally portrayed as a straight villain. Furthermore, her face was never fully visible and all images of her were posterized, giving her a stylized, unreal look. Although the actress portraying Carmen in the show was not directly credited, it has been confirmed that she was played by Janine LaManna in the first season, and later Brenda Burke until the show's cancellation. LaManna and Burke also portrayed minor characters, such as Elizabeth Cady Stanton and Eleanor Roosevelt.

Efforts were made at least once, in 2006, to produce a film featuring the character, possibly starring Sandra Bullock as the titular thief. In 2011 and 2012, there was talk that Jennifer Lopez would play the titular thief.

The 2019 Netflix animated series presents an intimate look into Carmen Sandiego's past where viewers not only follow her escapades but also learn her origins. Her backstory was that she was an orphan from Buenos Aires taken in and raised by V.I.L.E. at their secret Canary Islands headquarters. When she learns the truth, she turns on them and seeks to undo their thievery. Gina Rodriguez is the voice of the character for the series.

== Cultural impact ==
Though her name is loosely based on the Brazilian singer and actress Carmen Miranda, Carmen Sandiego is commonly considered to be of Hispanic descent. Carmen Sandiego is cited as having a major "cultural impact [on] Latin American girls" in particular. Martel states that "Sandiego has a particular impact on girls...because she was a symbol of cultural rebellion. She is the first major American pop culture example of a mischievous yet beloved hero who also happens to be both a woman and a Latin American." Julie M. Rodriguez of Care2 said: "There are so few examples of what a competent, successful Latina woman looks like in the media – and it's wonderful to realize that, even in the infancy of the video game industry, there was at least one game working to remedy that problem".

=== Reception ===
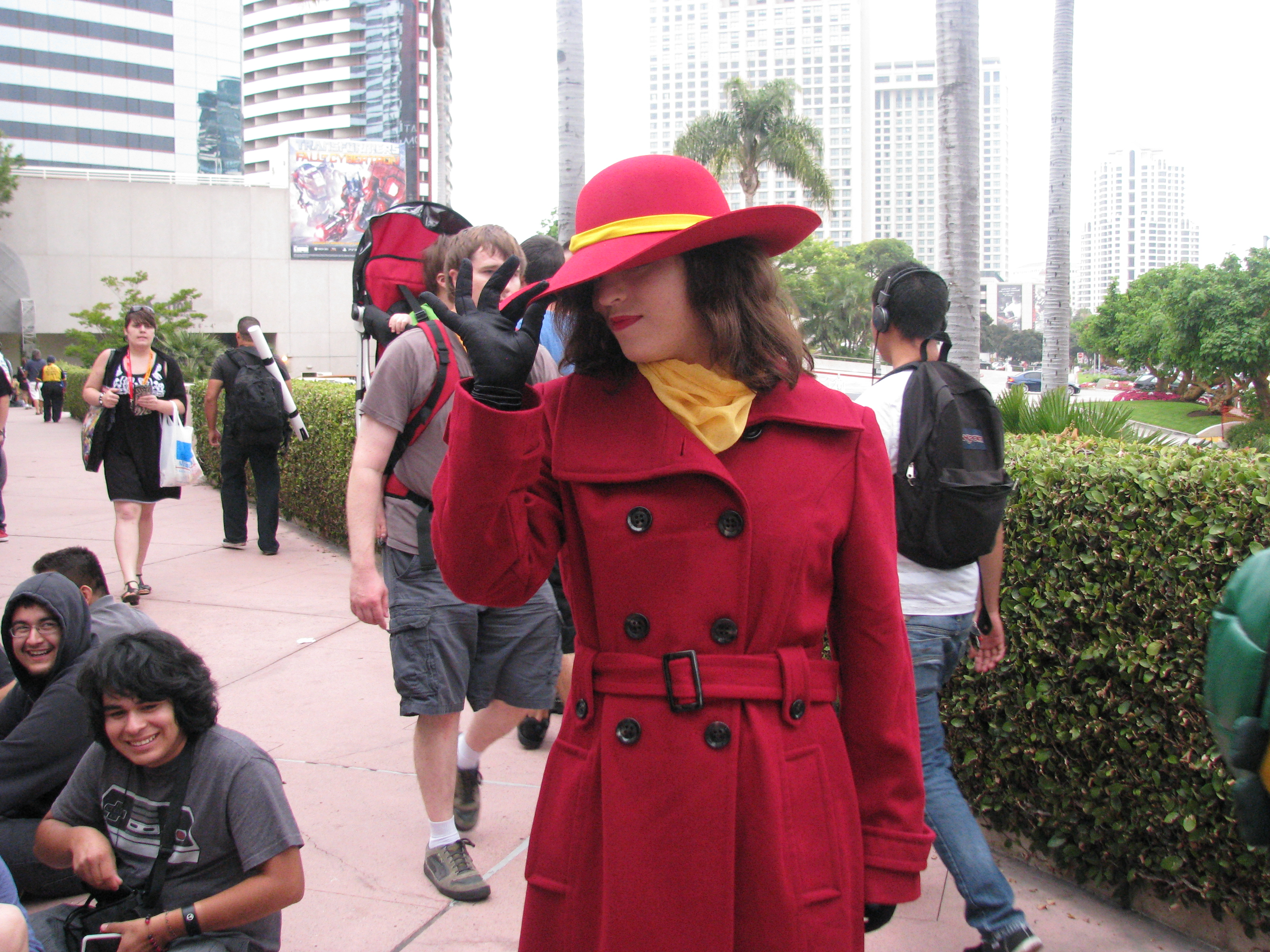
A cosplayer portraying the Carmen Sandiego character.

The character has had mostly positive reception. St. Cloud Times described her as "glamorous", "shifty", "smart", and "great fun to chase". Heather Alexandra of Kotaku described her as "mysterious", "clever", "dashing", a "mastermind", "cunning", "sly", "sneaky", "smart", and fashionable, summing her up as the "perfect childhood villain". Brittany Vincent of SyFy Wire stated that what drew her most to Sandiego was her "grandiose attitude and infallible confidence". Robert Workman of GameDaily elected Sandiego as the 21st most "evil mastermind" in video games of all time, and the website also included her among "the smartest video game babes". In 2011, Complex ranked her as third on the list of "most diabolical video game she-villains", and in 2012, they ranked her as the 27th coolest video game villain of all time as well as the tenth on their "The Most Evil Women In Video Games" list. In 2013, they placed Sandiego eleventh in a list of "12 Old School Video Game Characters Who Were Style Icons". Hugh Sterbakov of GamePro also included the character on its list of "The 47 Most Diabolical Video-Game Villains of All Time", placing her 44th. She was included in GameSpot's 2010 "All Time Greatest Video Game Villain" contest and lost to Sweet Tooth in "Round 1b". The same site included her in their "The Ten Best Female Characters". IGN placed Carmen Sandiego 62nd on their 2010 list of "The Top 100 Videogame Villains", saying she "is one tricky end boss". In 2012, GamesRadar+ included her on their "Mediocre Game Babes" article and in 2013 they ranked her as the 71st best villain in their "Top 100" list.
