= Where in the World Is Carmen Sandiego? Treasures of Knowledge =

2001 video game

- Developer: The Learning Company
- Publisher: Riverdeep
- Series: Carmen Sandiego
- Platforms: Windows, MacOS
- Release: November 12, 2001
- Genre: Educational/adventure
- Mode: Single-player

Where in the World Is Carmen Sandiego? Treasures of Knowledge (a.k.a. Where in the World is Carmen Sandiego? and Carmen Sandiego Treasures of Knowledge) is a point-and-click adventure game in the Carmen Sandiego franchise, released in 2001. (Note: Attributed to multiple references:) For its title, the game does not use the long-standing formula of the previous Where in the World Is Carmen Sandiego? titles. Instead, the game seems to be based on the structure of the newest version of Where in Time is Carmen Sandiego?, which The Learning Company retitled Carmen Sandiego's Great Chase Through Time.

The game was released onto Steam in August 2020, the first CD-ROM era Carmen Sandiego game to be readily available on modern hardware.

== Design ==
=== Art ===
Artist John Hays of Wild Brain Studios designed and directed the character artwork and animation for the game, giving a new makeover from the previous games.

=== Educational goals ===
The idea of the game was to reinforce knowledge of worldwide history, geography, religions, art, architecture and culture of 50 different countries to users in an entertaining and absorbing way. A translator feature was also included to incorporate teachings of foreign languages. In addition each mission encourages players to explore, examine clues, map read, identify landmarks and artifacts and learn words and meanings. The minigames and puzzles also serve to keep the player amused. Players are free to go through the game at their own pace, stopping to thoroughly explore any locale.

== Plot ==
The protagonists of the game are Julia "Jules" Argent, an experienced ACME detective and Carmen's former partner, and Shadow Hawkins, a new ACME recruit who is gadget-happy and rather arrogant. Jules and Shadow's personalities frequently bounce off each over the course of the game, similar to how Zack and Ivy were paired up in Where on Earth Is Carmen Sandiego?, in that they had trouble with each other, but in the end, they both got along. The Chief explains that she has paired them together because she believes their personalities complement each other and indeed by the end of the game they appear to have gained some respect for each other's methods (or have at least agreed to disagree).

Carmen steals a rare Franco-Italian edition of The Travels of Marco Polo and then proceeds to steal a Māori wood carving, Incan Quipus and other seemingly random items. Jules and Shadow find that each object Carmen has stolen seems to be tied to a mysterious Portuguese explorer, a lost city with a great treasure and a strange "wheel" design. On the eighth and final case, Jules and Shadow track down the lost city itself. Once inside the city, however, they find Carmen sitting inside a chamber filled with priceless treasures. Carmen suggests that she may be planning to lock Jules and Shadow away in the city, but Jules insists that Carmen would not do such a thing. Shadow captures Carmen by grabbing her wrist with a grapple launcher, but she inexplicably escapes through the use of a smoke bomb. Jules and Shadow debate if Carmen led them to the treasure for ethical reasons or if she is simply a bad person. Whatever were Carmen's true motivations remain a mystery.

== Gameplay ==
The game is divided into seven missions. The goal of each missions is to recover one item of the stolen artifacts which Carmen has hidden in a puzzle somewhere in the world. The user can only unlock this puzzle by collecting items or clues from other countries, often having to solve other puzzles first. A database can be used to find out where a place is and where an item can be found. At the end of each case, the item is found and it is announced that Carmen has stolen something else.

== Critical reception ==
Reception

Review scores
Publication	Score
GameCola	7/10
Game Pressure	8.6/10
Review Corner	5/5

Awards
Publication	Award
Parents' Choice	Gold Award
Academy of Interactive Arts & Sciences	PC Educational
Best Educational Software	Award of Excellence
Tech & Learning	Award of Excellence 2003

The Philadelphia Inquirer thought the graphics were "hopelessly primitive" when compared to contemporary Xbox and PlayStation titles. Learning Village called the title "completely updated and significantly enriched" when compared to the original 1985 version, and praised both the animation and storyline for being more sophisticated. The Washington Post was disappointed that the animation was reminiscent of a Saturday morning cartoon, but thought the storyline made up for this, ultimately recommending the game. Discovery Education praised the game's design. Tech With Kids gave it 5 stars.

The title was one of four featured in The Learning Company pack called Enhanced Educator Versions; this version of the game had a Class Progress Report that maintained and updated the progress of the player.

The Canadian Toy Testing Council gave Where in the World Is Carmen Sandiego? Treasures of Knowledge three stars on a scale of three stars, two stars, one star, novelty, not recommended.
