= An American Daughter =

Play written by Wendy Wasserstein

An American Daughter is a play written by Wendy Wasserstein. The play takes place in a living room in Georgetown, Washington, D.C.

== Production history ==
An American Daughter opened under the New Play Workshop Series at Seattle Repertory Theatre in June 1996. Directed by Daniel J. Sullivan (then-Artistic Director), the cast featured Meryl Streep, Julianne Moore, Penny Fuller, Adam Arkin, and Liev Schreiber.

The play premiered in a Lincoln Center Theater production on Broadway at the Cort Theatre on April 13, 1997, and closed on June 29, 1997, after 89 performances and 27 previews. Directed by Daniel J. Sullivan, the cast featured Kate Nelligan (as Lyssa Dent Hughes), Elizabeth Marvel, Lynne Thigpen (as Judith B. Kaufman), Penny Fuller, and Hal Holbrook. There were also recorded voices of several real-life "Television/Radio Personalities" such as Charlie Rose. Lynne Thigpen won the 1997 Tony Award, Best Featured Actress in a Play.

A benefit reading of the play took place on May 8, 2017, at the Second Stage Theatre's Tony Kiser Theatre (New York City). Directed by Christine Lahti, the cast featured Keri Russell, Hugh Dancy, Jonathan Groff, Victor Garber, Julie White, Raúl Esparza, Zoe Kazan and Quincy Tyler Bernstine. The reading benefited She Should Run.

There has also been a production by the L.A. Theatre Works.

The first New York City revival of An American Daughter ran from August 11th through September 20th on the Diamond Stage at the Pershing Square Signature Center in 2026. Directed by Sarna Lapine, the cast featured Jean Lichty, Robert Sean Leonard, Montego Glover, Dakin Matthews, Ryan Spahn, Mary Beth Peil, Carmen Zilles, Chris Ghaffari, and Will DeVary. Produced by La Femme Theatre Productions, the production garnered largely negative reviews.

== Plot ==
Dr. Lyssa Dent Hughes is the daughter of a U.S. Senator. She appears to be headed for nomination as the U.S. Surgeon General until a background check reveals she once neglected to return a jury duty notice. Then, she makes a faux pas in comments about her homemaker mother that leaves her open to a media blitz and her certain nomination suddenly appears to be in doubt. She is supported by her best friend, Judith Kaufman, an "African American Jewish feminist" physician, who has her own set of troubles.

== Critical response ==
New York Times critic Ben Brantley wrote: "Themes (big themes), relationships (deep and confusing ones), plot complications (of the melodramatic variety) are piled to the toppling point, most of them never satisfactorily defined. Neither Dan Sullivan's chipper, keep-it-moving direction nor Ms. Wasserstein's justly famed ear for dialogue and bone-deep sense of craft can conceal the feeling that she doesn't know entirely where she's heading or how to get there."

== Film adaptation ==
The play was made as a TV film released in June 2000, starring Christine Lahti.

== Awards and nominations ==
=== Original Broadway production ===
Year	Award	Category	Nominee	Result
1997	Tony Award	Best Featured Actress in a Play	Lynne Thigpen	Won
