= KidsWorld =

Canadian children's magazine

KidsWorld is an English-language Canadian magazine aimed towards children aged twelve and under, published by MIR Communications Inc. The magazine features sections and articles such as movies, sports, hobbies, and role models. The magazine is provided free to elementary schools, and is published on a quarterly basis. The headquarters of the magazine is in Toronto, Ontario. It is available online through Gale, and covered in Canadian Periodical Index. The ISSN is 1490–6341. Kids World Magazine as it was originally titled, was first published in March 1993. The website of the magazine was launched in 1996.
