= Where in the World =

Where in the World may refer to:

- Where in the World? (Irish game show), a 1987-1996 quiz show on RTÉ One
- Where in the World (UK game show), a 1983-1985 quiz show on Channel 4
- Where in the World? (album), a 1991 album by Bill Frisell
- Where in the World, a 2002 album by Sylvia
- "Where in the World?", a song by Kylie Minogue from Greatest Hits
- "Where in the World (song)", a song by Swing Out Sister from Kaleidoscope World
- "Where in the World", a song by Midge Williams & Her Jazz Jesters

== See also ==
- Where in the World Is Carmen Sandiego?, a series of computer games and related items
- Where in the World Is Matt Lauer?, a segment on NBC's Today show
- Where in the World Is Osama Bin Laden?, a 2008 documentary film
