= Where in the World is Carmen Sandiego? (Prodigy video game) =

- Screenshot of Where in the World is Carmen San Diego? on Prodigy circa 1988 (Prodigy)
- Series: Carmen Sandiego
- Genres: Adventure, mystery

Where in the World is Carmen Sandiego? is a game within the Carmen Sandiego franchise made for the Prodigy Interactive online service, a "special edition" and Prodigy service adaptation of the 1985 Broderbund educational game of the same name.

Prodigy was a computer service from a partnership of IBM and Sears. World was one of three games available on the extra audio card, alongside Silpheed and Cakewalk Apprentice. It was an on-line version of the popular PC title, written specifically for Prodigy. This version had a new adventure each week, each Carmen Sandiego episode sponsored by the Prodigy online.

The game was pitted to teach geography in an "exciting new way". The book Parents, kids & computers describes Prodigy's version of Carmen Sandiego as "a sort of online Carmen miniseries that changes from time to time".

It was often used as a major selling point of the Prodigy service to parents, and advertised as "your kids' personal tutor' and for "adventure and role-playing enthusiasts". It was highlighted as part of Prodigy's "Education and entertainment spanning school subjects". Other kid-friendly programming included Sesame Street and Nickelodeon.

== Gameplay and plot ==
Players can find the game through a series of menus for instance the Stories Menu, or by '[JUMP]: carmen'. Once in the game, the player will see 4 menu options: the current case, a How To Play page, Last Week's Winners, and an Acme Detective Agency Honor Roll. Clicking on the game yields three choices: start the case, read the eight criminal dossiers, or look at some hints.

As with other games in the series, World sees players traipse behind Carmen and her crooks in the hunt to capture them in the least amount of time possible. Players travel to three cities per case - after two stops the players should have enough information to know the name on the arrest warrant; in the third city the player must find the criminal and make the arrest with the correct warrant.

When players start a case, they navigate through a series of screens that introduce them to the case, and then they are introduced to the first city of investigation. Each city offered three locations to explore, for instance in Rome the player may visit the Auditorio, the Colosseum, or the Spanish Steps. Only one of the locations will yield both a clue about the next location and the thief's identity. If the player chooses the wrong location, their score goes up by 15 points and they are lectured by The Chief.

In the third city, The Chief asks the player to create an arrest warrant - players complete this by making selections in the crime computer about the suspect's characteristics, players don't need to fill in every option but need enough information to narrow down to one suspect. They can narrow down their search options by looking at the suspect's dossiers. The dossiers reveal information about the suspect's sex, hair color, vehicle, distinguishing feature (like tattoo, scar, or limp), and hobby, which will help identify the correct suspect when utilising clues in the crime computer.

In-game gameplay - dossiers are vital to give clues to players to help them correctly identify the suspect by comparing information to clues given out by witnesses in city locations.

This version was also a contest: the more quickly the player solved the puzzle, the lower their score. Points are given out based on actions taken in the game - it takes 5 hours to investigate any location in a city, and 15 hours to move from one city to the next. Players generally need to explore at least one location in each city to have enough information to complete each case. The perfect score is 60 – 45 hours to move three times, and 5 hours each to investigate one place in each city while guessing the correct location of the thief in the last city on the first try, a 1-out-of-3 chance.

The lowest (best) scores saw the player's name posted in the Prodigy service weekly hall of fame the following week. Only the player's first score in any week counts toward beating other members on the honor roll, players are able to play multiple times afterwards for fun. It was designed as a game of interest for younger members. The Prodigy service version offered new stories weekly that were always related to current events.

"For example, the inaugural Bible was stolen the week the President was sworn in, the lucky shamrock were taken on St. Patrick's Day, and, in this example, the engraving plates for the new issue of Italian currency are missing."

— The Official Guide to the Prodigy Service discussing how the Prodigy online version of World offered an opportunity for more timely plots.,

== Critical reception ==
The New York Times noted: "Because electronic books and games can be "published" more quickly than conventional books, Prodigy's "Carmen" is very topical". PC Mag noted it wasn't as graphically pleasing as the genuine article and wondered aloud if parents would want their kids using up the phone line for hours at a time to play the game. But the magazine questioned whether kids should be encouraged to take up the phone line for hours to be able to play. Compute felt the move was surprising for the popular Carmen Sandiego franchise, commenting that there was "even" an online version of the game. Mocagh suggested that the gameplay of the online version trumped the traditional game in which the player has the same experience each time they play. The Official Guide to the Prodigy Service wrote that the game is "really challenging for kids in fourth grade and up [and] entertaining for adults", and advises that players " always read through the dossiers" before playing - they also recommended playing with an encyclopedia or almanac handy, and visiting the next location even if only receiving a location clue because players can always receive enough suspect clues in the other cities. The Seattle Times felt the service's low monthly rate meant "the little ones can compute to their hearts' content" with titles like Carmen Sandiego. PC Mag noted that ads 'deferred the cost of the system'. Parents, kids & computers recommended children to try it if their parents were already subscribed to Prodigy, though noted this version requires "a bit more reading and a bit less action" than its PC counterpart. Online Access suggested "sometimes it doesn't seem as if enough clues have been gathered before Carmen and the gang are caught". Home Office Computing felt the game was representative of the wide range of services Prodigy offered. CD-ROM Professional deemed it "yet another incarnation of the popular game". Technology & Learning felt the game was adapted to the online environment with scaled-down graphics and less information per page. People said the game "strengthens geography muscles" and took part in Prodigy's kid-friendly brand. Computer Shopped agreed that games like Carmen Sandiego made are "aimed especially at kids".
