= Where in America is Carmen Sandiego?: The Great Amtrak Train Adventure =

1998 video game

- Developer: Broderbund
- Series: Carmen Sandiego
- Release: 1998
- Genres: Educational, mystery

Where in America is Carmen Sandiego?: The Great Amtrak Train Adventure is a 1998 video game and special edition of Broderbund's 1996 educational game Where in the World Is Carmen Sandiego?. It was developed by Broderbund as part of a co-marketing initiative with the American passenger railroad service Amtrak.

== Background ==
In 1998, Amtrak was at risk of losing its funding, and as a result the company decided to embark on a "comprehensive co-marketing venture" to increase brand awareness and ticket sales. They enlisted help from marketing agency E. James White Communications, who were "challenged to come up with a nontraditional media outlet to attract new Amtrak customers". The agency "borrowed a page from the McDonald’s strategy", adopting a strategy to "attract the next generation of rail riders". By marketing directly to kids, they were able to target those who have a significant influence on their family's travel habits, thereby helping drive family sales.

This resulted in a $4 million "Great Getaway Fares promotion" with the 1996 Carmen Sandiego title Where in the World Is Carmen Sandiego?. The promotion offered families discount travel fares from April 19 to May 21 (the first person pays the regular fare; the second passenger got 50% off, and the third rode for free), and a mail-in offer for a Where in America Is Carmen Sandiego? The Great Amtrak Train Adventure, advertised as a special edition of the game, for $9.95. Travel agents were able to obtain coupons - by calling (800) TEL-TRAK - for their clients to purchase the game for $7.95 plus tax, which was $2 off the advertised price. The special spring fares were valid for sites highlighted in the game.

Marian Azzaro, senior marketing director for Amtrak Intercity, expected the concept to boost Amtrak's family business by 10-15 percent, and felt the co-marketing was "a natural fit". It became the first promotion done through Amtrak's one-year licensing agreement with Carmen Sandiego. While Broderbund had previously had licensing deals with companies like Wendy's, KFC and Kodak, this marked the first time they created a game for a promotional partner.

The promotion was supported by spot and cable TV and print advertising. The animated TV spot was created by New York-based Ammirati Puris Lintas. It debuted on February 22 and featured the lead character Carmen and her crooks taking Amtrak trains on an adventure that is dubbed "the steal of the century". Meanwhile, print ads appeared in Florida daily media and national magazines such as Parents and TV Guide. After the promotion expired, the railroad was to distribute the special edition game through third parties such as Visa.

== Gameplay and plot ==
The core plot, gameplay, and assets are carried over from 1996's Where in the World is Carmen Sandiego, though there are some noticeable changes and additions. This could be thought of as a special edition, expansion, or mod of the original title.

The Great Amtrak Train Adventure players chase the crook Carmen Sandiego and her crooks across the United States in an Amtrak train. The game was aimed at children aged 7–12 and their families, and introduce them to the Amtrak's rail destinations through five animated Amtrak characters with pun-based names such as conductor Phil Steemahead. It showcased both Amtrak trains as well as its destinations such as the California Zephyr, Adirondack, Southwest Chief, Coast Starlight and Empire Builder.

== Critical reception ==
GamesRadar listed it as one of the three longest video gaming titles they found for an article dedicated to this topic, and said it "stretch[ed] the boundaries of rational naming". Buyer's Guide questioned whether it was "another great Carmen Sandiego disc or an ad for Amtrak". Deseret felt the effort was Amtrak's attempt to get kids "in the mood for a train trip". Baltimore Sun described it as "cheap, educational fun for the kids". The Tribune deemed the game "great value". A 2019 retrospective described an advertisement of the game as a tie-in that "cleverly used travel as a theme".

== Picture archives ==
- http://www.rrpicturearchives.net/showPicture.aspx?id=1451428
- http://www.rrpicturearchives.net/showPicture.aspx?id=1451429
- http://www.rrpicturearchives.net/showPicture.aspx?id=1451430
- http://www.rrpicturearchives.net/showPicture.aspx?id=1451431
- https://web.archive.org/web/19980507063134/http://www.amtrak.com:80/amtrak/promotion/images/carmengreat2c.jpg
