= Where in Time Is Carmen Sandiego? (game show) =

US WGBH-TV television program

- Based on: Where in Time Is Carmen Sandiego? published by Broderbund
- Directed by: David Turner
- Presented by: Kevin Shinick; Lynne Thigpen
- Starring: The Engine Crew; Alaine Kashian; John Lathan; Owen Taylor (season 1); Jamie Gustis (season 2)
- Theme music composer: Sean Altman; David Yazbek; Randy Vancourt (French Version)
- Opening theme: "Where in Time Is Carmen Sandiego?" by The Engine Crew
- Country of origin: United States
- Original language: English
- No. of seasons: 2
- No. of episodes: 115

Production
- Executive producers: Jay Rayvid; Kate Taylor
- Producers: Shirley Abraham (senior producer); Charles Nordlander; James Greenberg; Raeford Dwyer (animation producer)
- Production locations: Kaufman Astoria Studios; Queens, New York
- Editor: Kevin Conrad
- Running time: 30 minutes
- Production companies: WGBH-TV; WQED (TV)

Original release
- Network: PBS
- Release: October 7, 1996 – December 12, 1997

Related
- Where in the World Is Carmen Sandiego?; Where on Earth Is Carmen Sandiego?; Carmen Sandiego (Netflix series)

Where in Time Is Carmen Sandiego? is an American half-hour children's television game show loosely based on the computer game of the same name created by Broderbund Software. It is the second competition show to be based on the Carmen Sandiego franchise. Just like its predecessor, Where in the World Is Carmen Sandiego?, the show was produced by WGBH Boston and WQED Pittsburgh. However unlike the predecessor show, in which questions were strictly geography based, "Where In Time" focused more on history, social studies, and pop culture. The program ran for two seasons on PBS, consisting of 115 episodes (65 in Season 1 and 50 in Season 2), which ran from October 7, 1996 to December 12, 1997, with reruns airing until May 7, 1999. The show starred Lynne Thigpen as "The Chief", Kevin Shinick as "ACME Time Pilot Squadron Leader" replacing Greg Lee and "The Engine Crew" who is considered a replacement for Rockapella as various informants. It was recorded entirely at Kaufman Astoria Studios in Queens, New York City, which is also remarkably the longtime home of Sesame Street.

== Format ==
=== Opening/Intro ===
Before the show began, the viewing audience would see Carmen Sandiego in her V.I.L.E. headquarters (the gang being recognized by a giant letter 'V'). Carmen would complain about a circumstance, invention, or situation that improved society and the future for the better, and decide to steal a souvenir or symbol related to this event. In Season 1, she spoke in a fourth wall narration, while in Season 2, a surveillance nano-probe from ACME filmed Carmen in her lair where it went unnoticed.

Carmen would then assign once of her five V.I.L.E. henchmen to steal the day's loot. Before sending them through time, in Season 1, she would use an "Info-Beam" to convey the details of the heist, while in Season 2, she only provided a shining capsule she called a Loot Orb to keep it in.

The Chief then told the audience that Carmen's chosen henchman had stolen something from the past. She tells them to recover the loot in 28 minutes (the length of each episode) to prevent temporal paradox. The Chief would then introduce the Chronoskimmer (a UFO-looking spaceship in which most of the episode took place) and Kevin Shinick, the Chronoskimmer's Captain, Time Pilot Squadron Leader, and host of the show. Shinick would then introduce the time pilots/contestants competing in that day's mission and his assistants/helpers, "The Engine Crew", (similar to the Boyband Rockapella, in "Where In The World"), a group of urban hip-hop dancers who helped the Chronoskimmer run smoothly, and helped the contestants throughout the episode.

=== Round One ===
Three players (aged 9–14, who all lived in the New York, New Jersey, Pittsburgh, or Boston area) known as "Time Pilots" competed. Each was given a consolation of 100 'Power Points' to begin. Time pilots were situated in front of the Chronoskimmer dashboard, which would keep their individual scores, and also their "controllers" which had three different colors/options (pink, green, blue), to correspond to questions Shinick would give.

Each of the four sections of Round One consisted of an informative skit, a question in which a correct answer would earn 10 points (no penalty for wrong answers), and then a warp through time. The first skit was always the Mission Profile, in which the Chief briefs Kevin and the Time Pilots by identifying the time and place of the crime, as well as some background information on the loot. Shinick would then quiz the contestants, based on the information the Chief just explained, asking exactly what V.I.LE. stole. If the time pilots answered correctly, they would receive 10 points. No penalty for an incorrect choice.

Skits include the following:

- Cluefinder: The Cluefinder was an alarm identifying a clue, either leading into one of the other skits below, but it usually meant a visitor was coming onboard the ship. It was commonly a historical figure, civilian/human from the past, or object to appear aboard the Chronoskimmer to reveal more clues. The person brought aboard could be a famous figure such as Elisha Gray or Ada Lovelace or a normal ordinary person caught in a famous event, such as a Navajo Code talker or the opening of Coney Island.
- V.I.L.E. Villain: The show's villain was shown revealing a clue, ostensibly against his or her intention. When this happened, Kevin often exclaimed "We're losing communications!" if the villain was taking over the ship. On other occasions, the ship's nano-probes would film the villain reporting to Carmen, still giving the clue to the contestants.
- Collision Alert: Kevin conversed with a possible 'future' version of himself, to acquire clues.
- Parallel Universe: Clues were given by Commisaar (an evil Chief) and an evil Kevin from ACME Slimenet, the evil version of ACME Timenet.
- Omnicia: On certain occasions, when Kevin ran out of clues, he would ask the Chief to contact an omniscient informant known as Omnicia. According to the Chief, contacting Omnicia took a lot of power, and she always cited the risk of crippling the Chronoskimmer before using a computer secured in a briefcase to input the enabling codes.
- Engine Crew's Clues: The Engine Crew sang the clues from the Engine Room. On other occasions, the Engine Crew were in the Chronoskimmer's cafeteria conversing with Libby the Cafeteria Robot (portrayed by Thigpen) as other passengers dine in the background. One episode where Kevin interacted with Eleanor Roosevelt during the "Cluefinder" skit had him stating that the cafeteria is for the Engine Crew and some other people he doesn't know.
- Intruder Alert: The Intruder Alert alarm alerted Kevin to an intruder in his bedroom, which was Sector 5, where a figure identified as his mother revealed the clue.
- Millenia: "The world's oldest woman;" Millenia (portrayed by Thigpen) ostensibly had been around for almost everything. Sitting on a rocking chair on her front porch, she recalls a memory relevant to the current case.
- Elephant Guy: A businessman (portrayed by Owen Taylor) being chased through a jungle by an elephant gave clues to the time pilots, displayed in black and white.
- The Unknown Explorer: An old bearded sailor riding on a raft provided a clue. Portrayed by John Latham.
- ACME Street Entertainers: Three street entertainers (portrayed by The Engine Crew) performed in front of some of the studio audience members and gave out a clue.
- Molecular Generator Clue: Kevin found clues inside the Chronoskimmer's Molecular Generator.
- TIMENET Weather Report: A weather woman with a southern accent (portrayed by Alaine Kashian) gave clues during her weather report.
- Engine Room Alert: A siren would sound and Kevin responded. Then, one of the Engine Crew members in the engine room on the viewscreen would indicate to Kevin and the pilots that they've picked up a signal from one of the other sketches saying that they have some important clues. The sketch would then be put up on the viewscreen.

There were also additional opportunities for points at the end of each round:

- Data Boost: Kevin gave the pilots a choice of 2 or 3 answers and then read several questions (about five or six) on a given subject using those answers (e.g., listing terms and asking whether they were cars or facial hair; listing people's names and asking if they were already dead or not yet born in the year they've traveled to; simple true/false questions; etc.). The first pilot to buzz in and guess the correct answer scored 5 Power Points, but lost 5 Power Points if they gave a wrong answer. The Data Boost happened twice per episode in Season One and once per episode in Season Two; in Season One, the first time was because they ran out of Fact Fuel after a warp and the second time was due to the villain sabotaging the Chronoskimmer. In Season Two, it was always the villain's sabotage. After the first Data Boost, Kevin always said, "Just a reminder: all our fact fuel/data is verified by Encyclopædia Britannica."
- Global Pursuit: Immediately after a warp, the villain begins "globe-hopping" to try shaking off the time pilots. The time pilots looked at a map with certain areas circled on their screens and Kevin read clues about the locations, with three answer choices displayed alongside the map. Like the Data Boost, correct answers scored 5 Power Points while incorrect answers lost 5 Power Points. This round occurred once per episode and played similarly to the Chase round of Where in the World is Carmen Sandiego? In Season 1, pilots could ring in during the question, as was the case on World. In Season 2, pilots could only ring in after Kevin had finished reading the question.
- Ultimate Data Boost: The final contest in Round 1, taking place before the last warp. Identical to a normal Data Boost, but with twice as many questions each worth twice the normal value.

The two pilots with the highest scores after the first round advanced to the second round, while the third-placed pilot was eliminated from the game. If there was a tie between two pilots for second place or a three-way tie for first place, Kevin asked a tiebreaker question, which was always identifying a President of the United States.

=== Round Two: The Flight Plan ===
With Kevin in command, the two remaining pilots fast forward to the present day (or near–present day) and activated the Loot Tractor Beam to capture the stolen artifact. The time pilots now had to restore the item from present day where it was recovered, back to the initial time and place the situation originated from. The Chief listed eight historical and pop culture events, related to the day's theme that the pilots had to recite in reverse chronological order, with the final item being the day's loot; whichever pilot had the higher score from Round One chose who went first, with a coin toss as a tiebreaker. If a time pilot said an event out of sequence or took too long to choose an item, their turn ended. The first pilot to recite the events in the correct order restored the loot to its proper place in time and advanced to the Bonus Round to capture Carmen and the day's villain.

=== Bonus Round: The Trail of Time ===
The Trail of Time consisted of six "Time Portals/buildings," each themed on a different era, spaced out with no clear order, which the Engine Crew helped navigate the winning pilot through. Each portal had a locked gate stopping the contestant from advancing, and by pressing a button next to the door, Carmen Sandiego would ask them a question based on that episode's theme, with two answer choices. If the pilot answered correctly, the gate opened immediately, but if they answered incorrectly, the pilot would have to perform a physical stunt to manually open the gate (spinning a wheel, turning a crank, pulling a rope, etc.).

Once through the second or third gate, the pilot captured Carmen's assistant, and the time pilot then began chasing after Carmen Sandiego herself. If the pilot passed through the sixth gate within ninety seconds, they took the energized "Capture Crystal" and placed it into the "Chronolock Chamber" to capture Carmen. If the mission fails, Carmen escapes, fleeing from the Trail of Time with a mocking laugh.

The show always ended with Kevin, the pilot, and the Engine Crew saying: "At ACME Time Net, history is our job, and the future is yours!" followed by the theme song being played again, as they all headed back to the present.

== Episodes ==
Season 1 lasted 65 episodes and ran from October 7, 1996 until January 3, 1997. Season 2 lasted for 50 episodes and ran from October 6, 1997 until December 12, 1997. Reruns of the show continued on PBS until May 7, 1999. On May 8, 1999, PBS dropped the show from its lineup altogether in order to make room for more programs aimed at preschoolers.

== V.I.L.E. ==
Other than playing the Engine Crew, Owen Taylor, Jamie Gustis, Alaine Kashian, and John Lathan as well as James Greenberg (who was also one of the show's producers) and Paula Leggett Chase also portrayed Carmen's V.I.L.E. minions.

- Carmen Sandiego (portrayed by Janine LaManna in Season 1, Brenda Burke in Season 2) – V.I.L.E.'s mastermind, portrayed as a straight villain. Though her iconic red trench coat and fedora were visible, her face was largely obscured. Carmen herself was played by general cast members Janine LaManna and Brenda Burke. They were not credited, because the actresses also played "good" characters who would help the contestants.
- Baron Wasteland (portrayed by James Greenberg) – A British moustached villain wearing a V-marked eyepatch; a wealthy aristocrat who loves pollution and enjoys destroying the environment. His name is a play on "barren wasteland" and he is supposedly a native of the Industrial Era. He was only in the first season, being replaced by Buggs Zapper in Season 2 (see below). His getaway animation showed his body shattering into several triangular shards. When assaulting the Chronoskimmer, he would shock it with lightning emitted by his cane. He was the only villain on the show to be absent from the newer version of the computer game, although the game featured a different villain holding the title of baron, that being Baron Grinnit ("grin and bear it").
- Buggs Zapper (portrayed by James Greenberg) – Buggs Zapper is a New York-accented Italian-American mafia, gangster with a fear of insects who wears a pinstriped suit and constantly carries an old-fashioned bug sprayer. He was introduced in the second season, replacing Baron Wasteland (see above). In the computer game's manual, it is stated that his only goal in life is to "rub out" a single fly that may exist only in his imagination. When assaulting the Chronoskimmer, he was shown spraying a cloud of pesticide from his bug sprayer into an open hatch. His time era is presumably the 1920s to the 1930s. His name is a play on "bug zapper" and gangster Bugs Moran.
- Dr. Belljar (portrayed by Owen Taylor in Season 1, Jamie Gustis in Season 2) – A cyborg mad scientist. His name apparently refers to bell jars. He appeared on both of the show's seasons, but his appearance was drastically retooled for the second season. His getaway animation in the first season showed him disintegrated into a multitude of cubes through a device mounted on his wrist. In the second, he was simply obscured by television static. In season 1, he assaulted the Chronoskimmer by zapping it with electricity from his fingertips (identified as the "Misinformation Missiles"). In the second season, he sabotaged the systems directly.
- Jacqueline Hyde (portrayed by Alaine Kashian) – Jacqueline Hyde is a young present day valley girl with a split personality and psychopathic tendencies. Her two personalities are the sweet-tempered and innocent "Jacqueline" and the vindictive and insane "Hyde". She constantly alternates between her personalities, with each surfacing for a few seconds. She wears a red blazer, a pink blouse, a red miniskirt and knee-length stockings, perhaps to suggest a traditional schoolgirl uniform. Her getaway was becoming a sphere and floating from sight. In the first season, she assaulted the Chronoskimmer by throwing an orb of electricity; whereas in the second season, she physically sabotaged the craft at an open maintenance panel. Her name is a play on "Dr. Jeykll & Mr. Hyde".
- Medeva (portrayed by Paula Leggett Chase) – Medeva is an evil voodoo witch who mostly speaks in couplets, incantations, and spells. In season one, she assaulted the Chronoskimmer by breathing fire at it. In the second, she would cast a spell into an open maintenance panel that would cause something to happen to the Engine Crew, causing a Data Boost to be done to undo the spell. Her name seems to be a portmanteau of Medea (a sorceress in Greek mythology) and "diva", and/or a play on the term medieval.
- Sir V.I.L.E. (portrayed by John Lathan) – Sir Vile (or V.I.L.E., named after the association he's involved in), is an obsequious and very powerful and dangerous medieval knight. Sir Vile is a posh Black British man from the Middle Ages. In the first season, his armor was a dull silver; but appeared fiery red in the second. In season one, he assaulted the Chromoskimmer by striking it with lightning; whereas in the second season, he was shown ripping a cable from a maintenance panel and breathing fire into the opening. His name is a play on the adjective "servile", owing to how obsequious he acts around Carmen Sandiego.

== Prizes ==
The budget was smaller on this version of the show compared to World. As a result, the grand prize for a winning pilot capturing Carmen was a computer system instead of a trip.

The third-place player received an "ACME TimeNet Mission Pack." It contained a Britannica world atlas; a Where in Time is Carmen Sandiego? t-shirt, baseball cap, and wristwatch; and a collection of Carmen Sandiego CD-ROM games (all of which also featured Lynne Thigpen as the Chief) and board games: Where in Time Is Carmen Sandiego?, Where in the U.S.A. Is Carmen Sandiego?, and Where in Space is Carmen Sandiego? The second-place player received a Mission Pack and a CD player.

If the first-place player won the Bonus Round and captured Carmen, he/she won the grand prize of a complete multimedia computer system (specifically, the Gateway 2000 P5-120) a year of Britannica Online, a Britannica CD-ROM encyclopedia, and a 32-volume set of Encyclopædia Britannica (in season 1). If Carmen escaped, the pilot received a portable music system in addition to a 32-volume set of Encyclopædia Britannica (in season 1) or an ACME TimeNet Mission Pack (in season 2).

== Production ==
=== Conception ===
The series was created as a spin-off of the long-running geography game show, Where in the World Is Carmen Sandiego?. Executive producers Kate Taylor of WGBH and Jay Rayvid of WQED wanted to refocus the show on history as a recent study had shown American children were weak in this area, and because Broderbund had already created a game in this field. Taylor noted that it was important to them to create something new and fresh and different for fans of the original show.

Around 10% of each half-hour episode consisted of computer-generated animation and 3-D special effects, and the graphics/illustration for all episodes in a season were produced in around four months. The budget for each episode of the show' was $46,000. Animator David J. Masher spent $120,000 for animation equipment in his studio -he worked with a tight schedule and low budget. The question writers worked with the Encyclopædia Britannica and a panel of history teachers.

=== Educational goals ===
Rayvid noted that history can be more politically charged than the more cut-and-dried geography, noting, for instance, how the nature of historical documents led to bias toward male white stories. Moving away from a pro-American bias, in a World War II themed episode, the show spoke candidly about American internment camps for Japanese-Americans, citing this as an example of how "We try to deal with controversy in a very straightforward, educational way". Another aim of the show was to give young viewers "a sense of time", in that things happened before they were born that influenced their current reality.

=== Production ===
The music on the show was performed by The Engine Crew. The music package included the theme song and the songs about clues in the engine room. The theme was played in the opening and closing sequences. When the contestant was heading for the trail of time, the theme was sometimes edited after the crew sang, "We're on the case" and the villains say, "And they're chasing us through history!" (used in first season). In the second season, when the contestant headed for The Trail of Time, the ending was normal instead of the villains singing the end part. The show's main theme song was written by Sean Altman of Rockapella and David Yazbek, and is sung by The Engine Crew as the audience claps to the rhythm of the theme song in the first season. In the second and final season, the audience remain slient during the theme song, until the Chief calls Kevin's name twice, finally Kevin leaves the room then the audience claps.

Like its predecessor series, which faced outdated information during its run, the end of every episode had an audible disclaimer from Lynne Thigpen stating that "All historic information has been verified by Encyclopedia Britannica (and was accurate as of the date this program was recorded)." with the recording date shown with the copyright information at the end of each episode.

The show was funded primarily by the Corporation for Public Broadcasting and by the annual financial support from the viewers/stations of PBS throughout the entire series. Delta Air Lines and the National Endowment for Children's Educational Television both provided funding during the show's first season.

Scott Wells served as the 3-D animator while Raeford Dwyer was the animation producer; together they gave the show a style that mixed computer-treated video FMV performances computer-generated two- and three-dimensional animation and special effects.

A live version of the World and Time shows ("Carmen Sandiego Live") was performed at 85 sites across the United States and Canada from 1993 to 1997.

== Critical reception ==
The New York Times felt the show stood out among new afternoon series.

== Awards ==
Where in Time is Carmen Sandiego has been nominated thirteen times for awards. It also won a Daytime Emmy Award in 1998.

Award	Category	Nominee	Result
1997 Daytime Emmy Awards	Outstanding Children's Series		Nominated
1997 Daytime Emmy Awards	Outstanding Performer in a Children's Series	Lynne Thigpen	Nominated
1997 Daytime Emmy Awards	Outstanding Directing in a Children's Series	David Turner	Nominated
1997 Daytime Emmy Awards	Outstanding Graphic Titles and Title Design		Nominated
1997 Daytime Emmy Awards	Outstanding Graphic Titles and Title Design		Nominated
1997 Daytime Emmy Awards	Outstanding Achievement In Costume Designing/Styling	Wendy Stuart	Nominated
1997 Daytime Emmy Awards	Outstanding Hairstyling		Nominated
1997 Daytime Emmy Awards	Outstanding Live and Direct to Tape Sound Mixing		Nominated
1997 Online Film & Television Association Awards	Best Game Show		Nominated
1998 Daytime Emmy Awards	Outstanding Lighting Direction	Dikran Hazirjian & Charles Noble	Won
1998 Daytime Emmy Awards	Outstanding Children's Series		Nominated
1998 Daytime Emmy Awards	Outstanding Performer In A Children's Series	Lynne Thigpen	Nominated
1998 Daytime Emmy Awards	Outstanding Directing In A Children's Series	David Turner	Nominated
1998 Daytime Emmy Awards	Outstanding Multi-Camera Editing		Nominated
1998 Daytime Emmy Awards	Outstanding Costume Design/Styling	Wendy Stuart	Nominated

== International versions ==
- Quebec – A French-Canadian version of the show, titled À la poursuite de Carmen Sandiego (In pursuit of Carmen Sandiego), was produced by Radio-Canada in 1998 (with reruns airing through at least 2001), shortly after the original American version of the show ended, taped in Montreal using the same set as the American series. The French theme song was written and produced by Randy Vancourt. This version of the show stars Brigitte Paquette as "The Chief", Patrick Labbé as "ACME Time Pilot Squadron Leader", and Daniel Dô, Marie-Hélène Fortin, and Widemir Normil as "The Engine Crew". Gameplay in this version stayed the same as the original, with each pilot going through all six gates and capturing Carmen Sandiego wins a grand prize package that included a mountain bike instead of a computer system.
