= Where in Time Is Carmen Sandiego? (video game) =

1989 computer and video game

- Cover art
- Developer: Broderbund
- Publisher: Broderbund
- Designers: Gene Portwood; Lauren Elliott
- Series: Carmen Sandiego
- Platforms: Apple II, Classic Mac OS, Commodore 64, Amiga, MS-DOS, NES, Super NES, Genesis
- Release: August 1989
- Genres: Educational, strategy
- Mode: Single-player

Where in Time Is Carmen Sandiego? is a multiplatform video game where players have to travel through time to collect clues and the warrants necessary to capture Carmen Sandiego or her henchmen. The goal is to track Carmen's villains through history and arrest them and ultimately arrest Carmen.

Similar to the 1985 game Where in the World Is Carmen Sandiego?, the player plays as a secret agent for the ACME Detective Agency, and has to use research books to crack the clues given to them on which location (and time period) the crook went, and also decode the physical attributes or interests of the crook based on other clues. They must achieve these objectives in order to secure an arrest warrant, which allows them to identify the person at the end of the case as the crook. The player travels through time and space with a device known within the Carmen Sandiego universe as the Chronoskimmer. The game is time limited, and every action one takes uses up some of that time; the player needs to solve the case within the allotted time in order to be successful. As well as teaching the player about both geography and history it also provides practice with using a research book – a copy of the New American Desk Encyclopedia came with the game for assistance. The people, events, and inventions featured in the game hail from period in history ranging from 400 AD to the 1950s – the past 1500 years of human history. The game also comes with a 28-page instruction manual.

This was the first game in the series to establish that ACME Headquarters is located in San Francisco.

The game was released on a variety of different platforms including Apple II (1989), Amiga (1990), Commodore 64/128 (1990), Macintosh (1990), IBM PC Compatible (1990), Nintendo Entertainment System (1991), Sega Genesis (1992), and Super Nintendo Entertainment System (1993).

In 1991, Konami released a port of the game for the Nintendo Entertainment System which included a small, paperback encyclopedia as a free pack-in. Hi Tech Expressions later created a port for the Super NES. Electronic Arts also created a port for the Sega Genesis. The console versions did not include a Battery backed save file instead opting for a Password System

Gene Portwood and Lauren Elliott were the designers for the game, Lance Groody and Rod Nelson were the programmers, Don Albrecht, Leila Bronstein, Michelle Bushneff, Maureen Gilhooly, Julie Glavin, Avril Harrison and Barbara Lawrence all worked on graphics, Clair Curtin was the product manager, Susan Meyers wrote the clues, and Matthew Leeds wrote the manual.

== Gameplay ==
Screenshot of England in the year 1212

Players start out as a Time Cadet for the ACME Detective Agency (and throughout the game get promoted to various ranks based on number of cases solved up to Super Time Sleuth), and need to "track the criminals' movements, figure out where he or she is going next, obtain a warrant for his or her arrest, and send a 'Capture Robot' to arrest the thief". The player has to capture 80 criminals in order to beat the game and retire; if they wish to play again, they must do so under an assumed name.

The player finds this hideout by following the "trail throughout the time stream". The player asks people for clues, and every travel clue given at a location gives the player a hint as to the next destination and time period. Each location can be visited in several different eras, so the same country may appear more than once among the travel options, centuries apart. The player clicks on whichever of the travel options fits the clue, and is then sent there to receive the next clue. They know if they reach the correct location if they see a short animation of a VILE agent upon arrival.

The player also gets clues about the culprit's physical appearance and their hobbies/interests, which the player then uses to make the warrant.

The game can be played in five different languages: English, French, Spanish, German and Italian.

== Reception ==
Reception

Review score
Publication	Score
AllGame	3/5 (Mac)

Awards
Publication	Award
Codie award	Best Home Learning Program
MacWorld Game Hall of Fame	Best Adventure Game of 1990

From the time the game was released (August 1989) up until January 21, 1990, the game had sold "more than 100,000 copies". The game was "the best-selling software game during the 1989 holiday season". After shipping all 95,000 copies of the bundled encyclopedia it ordered in October 1989, Broderbund requested a special print run of 35,000 more copies in December.

Macworld named the Macintosh version of Where in Time Is Carmen Sandiego the Best Adventure Game of 1990, putting it into the Macintosh Game Hall of Fame, and called the graphics and gameplay "top-notch".

Compute! in 1989 stated that Where in Time was the most exciting in the series. It concluded that "besides being one great game [it] has the added value of being an exceptional educational program". Computer Gaming World also favorably reviewed the game, stating that it was "challenging and fun, as well as educational". Entertainment Weekly picked the game as the #13 greatest game available in 1991: "The first-ever video game to come packaged with its own softcover encyclopedia. Playing a 'time sleuth', you travel to various countries in various historical epochs, trying to accumulate enough clues to track down (for instance) the man who stole Paul Revere's horse".

A Newsday review noted its educational nature, saying it is "unlike most other video games which contain fast-paced action". It gave the game a rating of 8 out of 10. Nintendo Power gave the SNES version of the game a score of 3.2/5 in March 1993. A Power Play review for the Genesis version, published in June 1992, gave the game a score of 57 out of 100. Nintendo Power magazine gave the version a score of 3.6 out of 5 in November 1991, and Electronic Gaming Monthly (EGM) gave the version a rating of 58 the same month as well. GamePro (US) gave the NES version a rating of 5 out of 5 in December 1991.

A 1998 allgame review of the Macintosh version of the game by Lisa Karen Savignano commented on the game's sameness to the previous World title, and insinuated that a player's response to one game would determine how they respond to the other. She comments that the animated clip of the robot capturing the criminal "is cute the first couple of times you see it, but quickly grows boring and tiresome to the older set". She also commented on the "realistic sounds" of the deathtraps and the "improbable-sounding names" of the villains. Overall, she gave the game a score of 3/5 stars. This breaks down into: 3 stars for graphics ("static and photorealistic [and] cartoony"), 3.5 stars for sound ("they tell you if you...are on the right track"), 2 stars for enjoyment ("older kids may find it tiresome and continually the same"), 3.5 stars for replay value ("the game always plays differently each time, but your 80th case is always Carmen Sandiego"), and 3 stars for documentation ("a slim manual...explains the basics of the game"). PC Mag wrote that the game "sharpens a student's powers of deductive reasoning".

In 2014, The A.V. Club described the game as "the closest thing to a good Doctor Who game", arguing that "Where In Time still replicated the sense of adventure, danger, and mystery that gives Doctor Who so much of its life. The rhythms of each mission mirror an episode of Doctor Who almost exactly: The hero turns up unannounced, sticks his nose where it doesn't belong, solves a mystery in the nick of time, and zips away without bothering with cleanup or paperwork. Players travel through time in a Chronoskimmer that functions much the same way as the Doctor's TARDIS, serving as not just a vehicle but also as a mobile lab and headquarters. The Chronoskimmer's scanner is similarly reminiscent of the Doctor's sonic screwdriver, since both are all-purpose gadgets used to quickly pick useful information out of a scene, and both make satisfying electronic chirping noises when used".
