= List of fictional dogs in video games =

This is a list of fictional dogs originating in video games, which is a subsidiary to the list of fictional dogs. It is a collection of various notable dogs that are featured in video games, including arcade games, personal computer games, or console games.

Canine	Origin	System(s)	Notes
Ai	Puyo Puyo Tetris	Nintendo 3DS · Wii U · PlayStation Vita · PlayStation 3 · PlayStation 4 · Xbox One · Nintendo Switch · Windows	An anthropomorphic dog and chief engineer of the starship Tetra. Voiced by Yūki Tai in Japanese and by Joe J. Thomas in English.
Alice	The Last of Us Part II	PlayStation 4	One of many dogs trained by the WLF to assist in patrolling Seattle, Alice is primarily handled by supporting character Mel.
Alphonse	Fortnite	Multiple	A male anthropomorphic Shiba Inu skin. He wears a shirt, gloves, a pair of glasses, a necktie, and green pants with a belt buckle.
Amaterasu	Ōkami	PlayStation 2 · Wii	The main protagonist of the game, Amaterasu is the Japanese Shinto sun goddess, who has inhabited the form of a white wolf.
Angelo	Final Fantasy VIII	PlayStation	Full name: Sant' Angelo di Roma, the canine companion of Rinoa Heartilly. She assists Rinoa in most of her Limit Breaks.
Annoying Dog	Undertale	PC · PlayStation 4 · Nintendo Switch	A dog who represents the game's creator, Toby Fox. It often steals Papyrus' special attack bone, and is encountered mostly in Snowdin. It resembles both the American Eskimo and Samoyed breeds of dogs.
Ash	Fuga: Melodies of Steel 3	Windows · Nintendo Switch · PlayStation 4 · PlayStation 5 · Xbox One · Xbox Series X/S	A 19-year old anthropomorphic German Shepherd and leader of the Crimson Knights.
Barbas	The Elder Scrolls series	Multiple	The companion of the Daedric Prince Clavicus Vile, a shapeshifting Daedra who often takes the form of a dog. Is generally a feature of Clavicus Vile's quests in each Elder Scrolls game, and foil to the nastier side of his antics.
Barista	Rhythm Tengoku	Game Boy Advance	A white dog who wears red headphones and a recurring character throughout the series. Runs the in-game café, where he will offer the player conversation.
Bill Grey	Star Fox 64	Nintendo 64	Bill Grey is a fictional, supporting male character from the Star Fox series. He is an anthropomorphic bulldog with brown fur, though was originally gray in color, reflecting his name.
Blade Wolf	Metal Gear Rising: Revengeance	PS3 • Xbox 360 • PC	A robotic hound acting as both boss fight and companion.
Boney	Mother 3	Game Boy Advance	The pet dog of Lucas' family and eventual party member.
Boomer	Far Cry 5	PC · Xbox One · PS4	Recruitable character.
Britz Strudel	Fuga: Melodies of Steel	Windows · Nintendo Switch · PlayStation 4 · PlayStation 5 · Xbox One · Xbox Series X/S	An anthropomorphic male Dobermann child who was separated from his family.
Brown	Rule of Rose	PlayStation 2	A brown Labrador, loyal and able to track down items.
Buckley	The Last of Us Part I	PlayStation 3	The pet dog of Tommy; found at the dam in Jackson, Wyoming. Appears briefly in The Last of Us Part II.
Bullet	Blair Witch	PC • Xbox One • PlayStation 4 • Nintendo Switch • Oculus Quest • Oculus Quest 2 • Luna	A Belgian Malinois who is the companion of the main character, Ellis.
Caesar	Wargroove	PC · Nintendo Switch · Xbox One · PS4	A canine that leads armies with wordless dignity. He inspires and guides troops through battle.
Cheese Legs	Lisa: The Painful	PC	A white dog with light brown spots, Cheese Legs is the first enemy in the game.
Chef	Fortnite	Multiple	A male anthropomorphic Pug skin.
Chick and Hack Montblanc	Fuga: Melodies of Steel	Windows · Nintendo Switch · PlayStation 4 · PlayStation 5 · Xbox One · Xbox Series X/S	A pair of anthropomorphic Welsh Corgi twins. Chick is voiced by Natsumi Haruse, and Hack is voiced by Tomomi Mizuma.
Chop	Grand Theft Auto V	Xbox 360 • PlayStation 3 · Xbox One · PlayStation 4 · PC	The pet dog of Lamar Davis, Chop is eventually taken care of by Franklin Clinton.
Chorizo	Far Cry 6	PC · PS4 · PS5 · Xbox One · Stadia · Xbox Series X/S	A Dachshund pup on a special wheelchair who the player can recruit as a companion.
Conductor	The Murder of Sonic the Hedgehog	Windows · macOS	An anthropomorphic male St. Bernard and train conductor.
Copper and Booker	Animal Crossing series	Multiple	A pair of police dogs who guard the town gate and operate the lost and found.
D-Dog	Metal Gear Solid V: The Phantom Pain	PC · Xbox One · PS4 · Xbox 360 · PS3	D-Dog is one of the available buddies that can be found and deployed for use in missions alongside Venom Snake.
Digby	Animal Crossing: New Leaf, Animal Crossing: Happy Home Designer	Nintendo 3DS	An anthropomorphic Shih Tzu and twin brother of Isabelle, he is in charge of the Happy Home Showcase. Initially absent from Animal Crossing: New Horizons, he later appeared in an update.
Dinky Di	Mad Max	PC · PlayStation 4 · Xbox One	An injured dog that rides in a modified buggy with Max to help search for buried land mines.
Dog / Barkspawn	Dragon Age: Origins	PC · PlayStation 3 · Xbox 360	An optional Mabari Warhound character that can be recruited by the protagonist or is present in the human noble beginning sequence. Name defaults to "Dog" ingame, though the character is unofficially known as "Barkspawn".
Dog	Fable II	Xbox 360	The protagonist's dog, who accompanies them and can fight and locate buried treasure.
Dog	Resident Evil 4	Multiple	A dog who can be saved from a bear trap early in the game, and will then help the player during the fight against El Gigante.
Dogamy and Dogaressa (Dogi)	Undertale	PC · PlayStation 4 · Nintendo Switch	A pair of minibosses encountered in Snowdin Forest. They appear later as NPCs in Grillby's and are members of the Royal Guard.
DogDay	Poppy Playtime	Multiple	An orange American Cocker Spaniel who was the leader of the Smiling Critters. His pendant is a Sun.
Dogfella	Superbrothers: Sword & Sworcery EP	iOS • Android • PC	The companion of Logfella the lumberjack.
Doggo	Undertale	PC · PlayStation 4 · Nintendo Switch	A member of the Royal Guard, he is a miniboss encountered in Snowdin Forest. He is later found as an NPC in Grillby's. He cannot see outside of things that move.
Dogmeat	Fallout series	PC · Xbox One · PS4	A recurring character in Fallout, Fallout 3 and Fallout 4. He is an optional companion who the protagonist can recruit either by meeting certain criteria or as a random encounter. In Fallout 3, it is possible for Dogmeat's puppy to be found and recruited if Dogmeat dies while accompanying the protagonist. The design of Dogmeat in Fallout 4 drew inspiration from a real-life dog named River, who also performed motion capture for the character.
Dr. Jennifer Dogna	Super Animal Royale	PC · macOS · Nintendo Switch · PS4 · PS5 · Xbox One · Stadia · Xbox Series X/S	A Golden Retriever researcher and scientist.
Dribble	WarioWare, Inc.: Mega Microgames!	Game Boy Advance • GameCube • Virtual Console	A large anthropomorphic bulldog with red hair, who stands on his hind legs. He wears a blue jumpsuit with a picture of a teddy bear on the back, and a green hat which bears his logo. He is large, burly, and gruff, though calm and friendly, though perhaps not as intelligent.
Duck Hunt Dog	Duck Hunt	NES • 3DS • Wii U	An iconic pooch with an unparalleled sense of humor. One of the playable fighters in Super Smash Bros. for Nintendo 3DS / Wii U and Super Smash Bros. Ultimate.
Duke	Fortnite	Multiple	A male anthropomorphic Dobermann skin.
Fay	Star Fox 2	Super Nintendo Entertainment System (Note: The game is programmed for and runs on Super NES consoles. It never received a physical release for the platform, but the ROM image was re-released on the Super NES Classic Edition microconsole.)	An anthropomorphic female canine recruit and member of the Star Fox team.
Fetch	Fortnite	Multiple	A male anthropomorphic Pomeranian dog skin. He wears a dog bone-imprinted pink jumpsuit and a necktie.
Flam Kish	Fuga: Melodies of Steel	Windows · Nintendo Switch · PlayStation 4 · PlayStation 5 · Xbox One · Xbox Series X/S	A 22-year-old anthropomorphic female Dobermann lieutenant colonel of the Berman Empire. By the third entry, she is one of eleven assistant characters who accompany the children on their journey. Flam is voiced by Yui Kondo.
Floyd	JumpStart 1st Grade	PC	A Basset Hound who serves as a hall monitor in the 2000 updated version of JumpStart 1st Grade.
Frankie	JumpStart series	PC · Wii · Nintendo DS · Mobile app	An anthropomorphic dachshund dog who serves as the primary mascot of the JumpStart series of educational games. He first appeared in the original version of JumpStart 1st Grade.
General Pepper	Star Fox 64	N64	Commander-in-chief of the Cornerian Defense Forces.
Gizmo	JumpStart Adventures 4th Grade: Sapphire Falls	PC	The companion of the main characters, TJ and Sally.
Greater Dog	Undertale	PC · PlayStation 4 · Nintendo Switch	A member of the Royal Guard who is a miniboss encountered in Snowdin Forest. It is later found as an NPC in Grillby's. It has very big armor, but later it is revealed that it is a puppy, and that it only wants to play with Frisk.
Harriet	Animal Crossing series	Multiple	A pink poodle who runs the Shampoodle barber shop. She first appears in Animal Crossing: City Folk.
Hewie	Haunting Ground	PlayStation 2	The main character's companion throughout the game, a four-year-old white German Shepherd.
Interceptor	Final Fantasy VI	SNES • PlayStation • GBA • iOS • Android • PC	Dog owned by Shadow, who is hostile but friendly with Relm Arrowny.
Isabelle	Animal Crossing series	Multiple	A kind Shih Tzu and Digby's twin sister, who assists the player in their new role as the town mayor as their secretary and assistant. She first appears in Animal Crossing: New Leaf.
Jake	Dog's Life	PlayStation 2	The main character of the game; a happy-go-lucky American Foxhound on a mission to rescue the girl dog of his dreams, Daisy.
Jin Macchiato	Fuga: Melodies of Steel	Windows · Nintendo Switch · PlayStation 4 · PlayStation 5 · Xbox One · Xbox Series X/S	An anthropomorphic Basset Hound child. Voiced by Yūichi Iguchi.
K.K. Slider	Animal Crossing series	Multiple	A dog musician who has appeared in all of the Animal Crossing games to date.
KEI-9	Mass Effect 3	PC · Wii U · PlayStation 3 · Xbox 360	KEI-9 is a robotic dog left to Shepard by an engineer working on the Normandy. KEI-9 is purely cosmetic and roams the cargo bay area.
Koromaru	Persona 3	PlayStation 2	Dog who can summon a Persona.
Laika	Laika: Aged Through Blood	Windows · PlayStation 4 · PlayStation 5 · Xbox One · Xbox Series X/S · Nintendo Switch	An anthropomorphic female coyote and player character who rides around in a motorcycle.
Lappy	Astral Chain	Nintendo Switch	An anthropomorphic Labrador mascot of the Ark Police and a public relations officer. He is usually seen carrying balloons.
Lesser Dog	Undertale	PC · PlayStation 4 · Nintendo Switch	A member of the Royal Guard who is one of the monsters encountered in Snowdin Forest and is later found as an NPC in Grillby's. Its neck often grows when it is excited. Like Greater Dog, it merely wants to play.
Malt Marzipan	Fuga: Melodies of Steel	Windows · Nintendo Switch · PlayStation 4 · PlayStation 5 · Xbox One · Xbox Series X/S	The lead Caninu protagonist child of the first two Fuga games.
Meeko	Skyrim	PC · Xbox 360 · PlayStation 3 · Xbox One · PlayStation 4	A recruitable and adoptable canine companion found on the road near "Meeko's Shack".
Mei Marzipan	Fuga: Melodies of Steel	Windows · Nintendo Switch · PlayStation 4 · PlayStation 5 · Xbox One · Xbox Series X/S	Malt's younger sister.
Milla Basset	Freedom Planet	PC · Wii U · PlayStation 4 · Nintendo Switch	A young girl Basset Hound with orange hair and one of the playable protagonists. She is voiced by Aimee Smith.
Mimpi	Mimpi	iOS • OS X • Android • PC	The protagonist, Mimpi is a little dog who sets out to find his owner.
Mira	Silent Hill 2	PC · PlayStation 2 · Xbox	Revealed to be the mastermind behind the events of the game in a joke ending.
Missile	Ghost Trick: Phantom Detective	Nintendo DS	He stars in the mini-game "Missile Omikuji", where he tells fortunes to players in his "enthusiastic" style. Missile is a Pomeranian with brown and white fur. He is very excitable from loud noises and strangers by barking at them to greet them. However, he is very loyal, doing anything in his power to protect his owners Lynne and Kamila.
Missile	Ace Attorney series	Multiple	A Shiba Inu breed K-9 police dog with the Los Angeles Police Department who briefly appears in several games. Detective Dick Gumshoe is in charge of the dog's care, and calls him one of his "Seven Secret Weapons".
Moss	Pikmin 4	Nintendo Switch	Moss is the companion dog of Captain Olimar in Pikmin 4. Moss acts as an opponent to the player during the game, and appears in the game's Dandori Battles.
Muggshot	Sly Cooper series	PlayStation 2	A recurring villain in the franchise. He appears only in the first and third games of the series, but also makes appearances in the second issue of the comic series and a promotional short called "Timing is Everything".
"Good Boy" Mutt	Kingdom Come: Deliverance	PC · PlayStation 4 · Xbox One · Nintendo Switch	A large, muscular dog of indeterminable breed formerly owned by a butcher, Mutt joins the protagonist, Henry of Skalitz, after they both survive the massacre of their hometown. Mutt can be trained for hunting game, discovering hidden items and distracting enemies by biting and wrestling them.
Oatchi	Pikmin 4	Nintendo Switch	Oatchi, a breed of creature dubbed "Space Dog", is a member of the Rescue Corps; a group of intergalactic individuals tasked with rescuing space adventurers who have become stranded. Oatchi is one of two playable characters in the game's main story along with the playable character, who they are partnered with to explore the Pikmin planet and find Olimar.
Pablo	Grapple Dog	Nintendo Switch, Microsoft Windows, Xbox Series X/S	The titular anthropomorphic dog protagonist of the game.
PaRappa the Rapper	PaRappa the Rapper	PlayStation	Trying to impress the love of his life. He motivates himself out of problems with his catchphrase, "I Gotta Believe!" His name comes from the Japanese term for 'paper thin'.
Pascal	Shin Megami Tensei	Super Nintendo Entertainment System	Pet dog of the protagonist, can be used to summon Cerberus
Peter Puppy	Earthworm Jim	Sega Genesis	An anthropomorphic alien dog with the ability to transform into a large monstrous form whenever he is hurt or scared.
Polterpup	Luigi's Mansion 2: Dark Moon	Nintendo 3DS	A ghostly dog that appears throughout the game. It is the only ghost that Luigi is not afraid of. He appears again in Luigi's Mansion 3.
Poochy	Yoshi's Island	SNES · GBA	Similar to a dog, yet has no visible ears or nose, and looks somewhat like a duck. Poochy & Yoshi's Woolly World introduces three "Poochy Pups", who provide assistance in the game's "Mellow Mode".
Poppy	Samurai Shodown	Arcade · Various	The husky companion of Galford.
Popka	Klonoa series	Multiple	The sidekick of Lolo, who accompanied Klonoa to save the world.
Psyche	Fuga: Melodies of Steel 3	Windows · Nintendo Switch · PlayStation 4 · PlayStation 5 · Xbox One · Xbox Series X/S	A 17-year old anthropomorphic Dobermann and member of the Crimson Knights.
Pyrok	Fuga: Melodies of Steel 3	Windows · Nintendo Switch · PlayStation 4 · PlayStation 5 · Xbox One · Xbox Series X/S	A 23-year old anthropomorphic German Shepherd and the oldest member of the Crimson Knights.
Ralph	Sleepwalker	Amiga • PC • C64 • Atari	The protagonist, tasked with rescuing its owner Lee.
Red Savarin	Solatorobo: Red the Hunter	Nintendo DS	A 17-year old male mecha pilot and freelance adventurer. Voiced by Tetsuya Kakihara.
Reindog	MultiVersus	PC	One of the playable characters.
Reksio	Reksio (video game series)	PC	The main character of the game. A white dog with orange spots.
Repede	Tales of Vesperia	Xbox 360 · PlayStation 3	Faithful companion of Yuri Lowell and playable character. Wears an eyepatch and wields a dagger as a weapon. Also has a pipe in his mouth, though is not shown using it to smoke.
Rex	Fallout: New Vegas	PC · Xbox 360 · PS3	The King's pet Cyberdog, loaned to The Courier originally for a quest, then on a semi-permanent basis.
Riley	Call of Duty: Ghosts	PC · Xbox One · Xbox 360 · PS3 · PS4	A loyal military dog who accompanies the protagonist on a series of missions spanning the globe.
Ros	Assassin's Creed Odyssey: The Fate of Atlantis part I	PC · Xbox One · PS4 · Nintendo Switch	Ros was the personal pet dog of the Isu Persephone in the simulation of Elysium. When combined with the Apple of Eden, Ros is actually Cerberus, guardian of the Underworld.
Rosie	The Walking Dead: The Final Season	PC · Xbox One · PS4 · Nintendo Switch	An American Bulldog who eventually becomes Clementine's pet.
Rufus	Red Dead Redemption	Xbox 360 · PlayStation 3	Rufus is the family dog of the Marstons' and a dependable tracking dog.
Roscoe the Space Dog	Space Channel 5 series	Various	A hostage and dancling who is forced to dance by the Morolians, and later the Rhythm Rogues in an alternate timeline. Roscoe accompanies Ulala if he is saved, and enjoys barking and dancing. He belongs to a group called "dogma," and is also known by his other alias, "Funny." Roscoe is rumored to be a robot dog.
Roswell	JumpStart Adventures 6th Grade: Mission Earthquest	PC	The pet blue canine of Zack and Jess.
Rush	Mega Man 3	NES	Mega Man's robot dog companion, able to transform into several vehicle forms as part of his support role.
Sam	Sam & Max	PC · Xbox 360 · Wii · PS3 · Nintendo Switch · MS-DOS · MAC OS · IOS	An anthropomorphic private investigator, often described as a six-foot-tall dog who wears a suit and a fedora. He works along his partner, Max, with the purpose of solving problems as the Freelance Police, though often in a maniacal manner.
Sam	The Walking Dead: Season Two	Multiple	A stray dog who Clementine meets in Episode 1.
Scratch	Baldur's Gate 3	Xbox Series X/S · PS5 · PC · macOS	A stray dog, potential camp follower and familiar of the protagonist.
Scubby	Liar's Bar	PC	An anthropomorphic male Dobermann. He is seen wearing a black tank top, a gold chain around his neck, and a pair of pants with a belt buckle. Scubby also occasionally smokes cigars.
Shadow	Dead to Rights	Xbox · PS2 · GCN · PC · PS3 · PSP · GBA · Xbox 360	Jack Slate's dog. Can perform instant takedowns, and is available for stealth missions in Retribution.
Sif, the Great Grey Wolf	Dark Souls	Xbox360 · PC · PS3	Great Grey Wolf Sif is the wolf companion of Sir Artorias, the Abysswalker.
Socks Million	Fuga: Melodies of Steel	Windows · Nintendo Switch · PlayStation 4 · PlayStation 5 · Xbox One · Xbox Series X/S	An anthropomorphic bespectacled male Terrier who loves knowledge and mechanics. Voiced by Miyu Tomita.
Squirt	JumpStart Advanced 1st Grade	PC	A puppy who is the younger cousin of Frankie.
Tiere	Fuga: Melodies of Steel 3	Windows · Nintendo Switch · PlayStation 4 · PlayStation 5 · Xbox One · Xbox Series X/S	A 20-year old anthropomorphic Collie and the only female member of the Crimson Knights.
Temjin	Space Channel 5: Part 2	Dreamcast • PlayStation 2 • PC • Xbox 360	A narky dog that enjoys the company of Alumi.
Timber	Far Cry New Dawn	PC · Xbox One · PlayStation 4 · Stadia	A mutated stray dog that can be hired as a companion.
Torgal	Final Fantasy XVI	PlayStation 5	Resembles a real-life grey wolf, appearing as both a puppy and an adult, and provides assistance during battles.
Vigilance	Skyrim	PC · Xbox 360 · PlayStation 3 · Xbox One · PlayStation 4	Can be bought from Banning at the Markarth Stables, and will then serve as companion to the Dragonborn.
Waffle Ryebread	Tail Concerto	PlayStation	A 16-year old anthropomorphic male canine police officer and mecha pilot.
Walt	Valiant Hearts: The Great War	PC • PS3 • PS4 • Xbox 360 • Xbox One • iOS • Android • Nintendo Switch • Stadia	A brave medical dog who assists his human in the war-torn fields, inspired by the courageous frontline dogs of World War I. Walt and his sister were the main heroes of the iOS-exclusive interactive comic Valiant Hearts: Dogs of War.
Wappa Charlotte	Fuga: Melodies of Steel	Windows · Nintendo Switch · PlayStation 4 · PlayStation 5 · Xbox One · Xbox Series X/S	An anthropomorphic female Spaniel who loathes losing. Voiced by Hiyori Nitta.
Whiskey	Commandos 2: Men of Courage	PlayStation 2	A Bull Terrier and playable character who is befriended by the Commandos after his owner, a wounded ally, dies while imprisoned.
Wonder Dog	Wonder Dog	Sega Mega-CD • Amiga 1200	A dog who must rescue his home planet from invading forces.
Yamato	Shadow Dancer: The Secret of Shinobi	Sega Genesis	The companion dog of the protagonist, Joe Musashi, who is known as Hayate in the Japanese version.

== See also ==
- List of fictional cats in video games
