= Fuga: Melodies of Steel 3 =

2025 video game

- Developer: CyberConnect2
- Publisher: CyberConnect2
- Director: Hiroto Niizato
- Producer: Shingo Watanabe
- Designers: Hiroto Niizato; Hisashi Natsumura; Takahide Ishii; Ryuto Kitamura; Songwei Bao
- Programmers: Daisuke Ito; Ryuichi Sakata; Takumi Taniguchi; Naoki Hashimoto; Ichika Terui
- Writer: Yasuhiro Noguchi
- Composer: Chikayo Fukuda
- Series: Fuga; Little Tail Bronx
- Engine: Unreal Engine 4
- Platforms: Microsoft Windows; Nintendo Switch; PlayStation 4; PlayStation 5; Xbox One; Xbox Series X/S
- Release: WW: May 29, 2025
- Genre: Tactical role-playing
- Mode: Single-player

Fuga: Melodies of Steel 3 (Note: Known in Japan as 戦場のフーガ3 (Senjō no Fūga Tsu, "Fugue of the Battlefield 3")) is a tactical role-playing video game developed and published by CyberConnect2. It is the sixth title in the company's Little Tail Bronx series, serving as the third and final entry of the previous two Fuga games that released in 2021 and 2023 respectively. The game was released worldwide on May 29, 2025, for Microsoft Windows, Nintendo Switch, PlayStation 4, PlayStation 5, Xbox One and Xbox Series X/S.

== Plot ==
Following the events of Fuga 2, Malt, the oldest member of a group of children who once used the gargantuan Taranis tank to fight off an invasion by the Berman Empire, is accosted by agents of that same empire after approaching the cave by his home village where the Taranis was originally found. Some months later, he is bound beside the Kaiser of the Berman Empire and watches in despair and anguish as his friends are killed in the Taranis by a new invading army. As he is sent back in time, he finds himself a prisoner of the Berman and awaits rescue.

== Development ==
In February 2022, Fuga 3 was indirectly announced as simply as a third entry by Fuga series director, Yoann Gueritot. The game was directed by Hiroto Niizato instead of Gueritot since the latter left CyberConnect2 midway through the production phase of Fuga 2 in March 2023.

During Anime Expo 2024, in an interview with RPGSite, a representative from CyberConnect2 stated that Fuga 3 would "be over twice as long as the previous entries with over double the illustrations".

In January 2025, a teaser trailer was unveiled and given a release date of May 29.

== Reception ==
The PC version of Fuga: Melodies of Steel 3 received generally favorable reviews from critics, according to the review aggregation website Metacritic. Fellow review aggregator OpenCritic assessed that the game received strong approval, being recommended by 81% of critics.
