= Fuga: Melodies of Steel 2 =

2023 video game

- Developer: CyberConnect2
- Publisher: CyberConnect2
- Directors: Yoann Gueritot; Hiroto Niizato
- Producer: Hiroshi Matsuyama
- Artist: Tokitsu Yusuke
- Writer: Yasuhiro Noguchi
- Composer: Chikayo Fukuda
- Series: Fuga; Little Tail Bronx
- Engine: Unreal Engine 4
- Platforms: Microsoft Windows; Nintendo Switch; PlayStation 4; PlayStation 5; Xbox One; Xbox Series X/S
- Release: WW: May 11, 2023
- Genre: Tactical role-playing
- Mode: Single-player

Fuga: Melodies of Steel 2 (Note: Known in Japan as 戦場のフーガ2 (Senjō no Fūga Tsu, "Fugue of the Battlefield 2")) is a tactical role-playing video game developed and published by CyberConnect2. It is the fifth title in the company's Little Tail Bronx series and is a direct sequel to the original Fuga: Melodies of Steel released in 2021. The game was released worldwide on May 11, 2023, for Microsoft Windows, Nintendo Switch, PlayStation 4, PlayStation 5, Xbox One and Xbox Series X/S.

A third and final entry of the Fuga series, Fuga: Melodies of Steel 3, was released in May 2025.

== Premise ==
Fuga 2 is set one year after the events of Fuga: Melodies of Steel, taking place in the same world modeled after World War II-era France and populated by anthropomorphic dogs ("Caninu") and cats ("Felineko"). With the recent armistice between the nations of Berman and Gasco, the bloody conflict which served as the backdrop of the previous game has ended. The main characters have separated to live peaceful lives until their gigantic tank, the Taranis mysteriously activates and goes on a rampage, capturing some of them in the process. Led by the young Caninu boy Malt Marzipan, the remaining children, along with their new ally Vanilla, board a new tank, the dread weapon Tarascus, to rescue them.

== Development ==
Fuga 2 was first announced by representatives of CyberConnect2 on July 14, 2022. More information was revealed two weeks later in an issue of Famitsu magazine, which confirmed the game's multiplatform release for Microsoft Windows, Nintendo Switch, PlayStation 4, PlayStation 5, Xbox One, and Xbox Series X/S in 2023. Development began as a result of the team's original decision to make the series a trilogy, with the story picking up after the "true" ending of the original game where every member of the player's party survives, and having a main scenario twice as long as the previous entry. A teaser trailer was released at the same time, along with details of the game's revamped battle system and quality-of-life improvements over the original game. In January 2023, the title received its release date of May 11, 2023, as well as confirmation that it would be included as part of Xbox Game Pass for Microsoft consoles and Windows.

The game represented a passion project of the studio, with development of the sequel proceeding despite not making their profit margin on the first game. It was produced by many of the same staff who produced the original title, including character design by artist Tokitsu Yusuke and music by Chikayo Fukuda. Yoann Gueritot, director of the previous game, would leave the company partway through development of the sequel, stating "I am sad I couldn't guide my beloved and brave children through the end of their journey, but Fuga already has a strong and solid basis, and I am sure the team will do a fantastic job."

Fuga 2 was released as both standard and digital deluxe editions, the latter containing a downloadable art book and 15-track mini soundtrack as well as in-game bonus items. A number of in-game bonus items can also be earned if the player has save files with specific ending earned in the previous title.

== Reception ==
Reception

Aggregate score
Aggregator	Score
Metacritic	PC: 86/100; NS: 84/100; XSX: 86/100

Review scores
Publication	Score
Famitsu	33/40 (Switch/PS4)
Hardcore Gamer	4.5/5 (Switch)
The Games Machine (Italy)	8.5/10 (XSX)
GamingBolt	8/10 (PS5)
Multiplayer.it	8.5/10 (Switch)
RPG Site	9/10 (PC)
Siliconera	9/10 (Switch)

Fuga 2 received a 33 out of 40 total score from Japanese Famitsu magazine based on individual reviews of 9, 8, 8, and 8. Austin Wood of Yahoo! Singapore described the game as "Beastars meets Valkyria Chronicles", calling it "a legitimately good strategy game;" praising it for its moral and strategic choices. John Cantees of GamingBolt stated that the sequel was "a surprisingly solid tactical RPG that strikes a good balance between accessibility and skill" giving it the final verdict of "great", John also pointed out how "the story is hampered by weak writing and inconsistent characters, but apart from that there isn't much to complain about".
