= Missile (Ghost Trick) =

Ghost Trick character

- Missile in Ghost Trick
- First appearance: Ghost Trick: Phantom Detective (2010)
- Created by: Shu Takumi

Missile (Japanese: ミサイル, Hepburn: Misairu) is a character in Ghost Trick: Phantom Detective. He is a Pomeranian dog who first meets the protagonist, Sissel, after he is killed and becomes a ghost. After Sissel saves his life, he further assists him in his quest while attempting to keep his owners, Lynne and Kamila, safe. He is based on director Shu Takumi's dog of the same name and breed. He has been a popular character among fans and critics, identified as one of the best dogs in games and a highlight of the Ghost Trick cast.

== Appearances ==
Missile appears in Ghost Trick: Phantom Detective as the supporting character to the protagonist, Sissel, a man who has recently been murdered and is trying to learn who he is and why he died. Sissel discovers that he has the power to go back four minutes before someone's death to potentially save them. He uses this to prevent the death of a woman named Lynne, who then went back to her own apartment. Sissel is assisted on this quest by a ghost inhabiting a desk lamp called Ray, who tells him that he has only until the end of the night before he disappears forever, using that to set him on his quest to travel to the apartment through the phone lines.

In this apartment, Sissel finds a girl tied up, a dead dog, and a man with a gun. Sissel helps Missile survive his death, and Kamila goes to the park. Missile follows, but is ultimately killed, and as a ghost, gains the ability to swap objects of the same shape. Once he and Sissel reunite, they use their powers to help save multiple people's lives. They eventually find a man named Yomiel, who looks like Sissel. Yomiel turns out to have died ten years prior, but is stuck in a state of both life and death due to being struck by a fragment of a meteorite, which causes people to gain powers as ghosts when they die in its proximity. Missile and Sissel go four minutes before Yomiel's death, causing the events of the game to not happen.

Before the timeline is changed, Sissel is visited by Ray, who reveals himself to be Missile, but much older. He reveals that he once attempted to prevent the events of that night from happening, gaining the powers of the dead because in this timeline, he was killed in Yomiel's presence. However, he couldn't travel the telephones like Sissel could, and Sissel refused to help. Thus, Missile couldn't save anyone, and went four minutes before Yomiel's death. He then spent ten years waiting, ultimately manipulating Sissel by lying about things to trick him into helping. In the new timeline, the younger Missile once again appears as the family pet.

On the official Ghost Trick remaster website, a short story was released, titled Encounter with a Missile, which detailed how Missile came to live with Kamila and Lynne.

== Concept and creation ==
Missile was created for Ghost Trick: Phantom Detective, initially included in a test demo for the game. This demo, which was built around ensuring that a girl survives her death, did not originally include him, but was included later after director Shu Takumi thought about who might die in her place. After this, the staff deliberated on the type of dog, with the first thing to come to mind for Takumi being a Pomeranian. While Takumi has a Pomeranian named Missile, he noted that he did not make it a Pomeranian so he could include his own dog. However, the way he imagines his dog was used in the creation of Missile's character. His animation was handled by Sayuri Shintani. Because Pomeranians have fluffy fur, his model was difficult to animate in 3D. Ghost Trick producer Shingo Izumi called Missile his favorite character, recounting how he always smiles when he sees a Pomeranian. A Shiba Inu named Missile appears in the Ace Attorney series, also created by Takumi.

== Merchandise ==
Missile has received multiple pieces of merchandise, including a muffler towel depicting him. A Missile-themed pillow was given away to winners of an official Capcom Twitter campaign. He is featured on a Ghost Trick T-shirt, along with Sissel, Lynne, and Kamila. An original song was originally produced for the game's three-year anniversary in 2014, titled "I'm a Missile". This track was composed by the game's director, Shu Takumi, Along with the Ghost Trick remaster in 2023, a remaster of this song was also released, titled "I am Missile Captune/CAP-JAMS feat.Takshu". Missile was also featured as part of a set of stickers found on the Line messaging app.

== Reception ==
Missile has received positive reception, receiving significant praise in many reviews of Ghost Trick and being identified as one of its highlights by multiple critics. (Note: See Destructoid, RPGFan, Vice, Siliconera, and GamesRadar+) Siliconera writer Stephanie Liu stated that she heard "play this game for Missile" a lot. According to Janet Hsu, one of the game's English localizers, Missile outshone Sissel, being among the most beloved characters in the game. IGN writer Sigh regarded him as a standout among the cast, while Power Unlimited staff felt that he overshadowed the protagonist and stole the hearts of all Ghost Trick players. Famitsu writer Arimichi felt that Missile embodied a pet dog well due to how caring he was, saying that they were happy with the Ghost Trick remaster due to being able to meet Missile again. He considered him one of his favorite characters, and felt he was among the most popular characters in the game. GameSpot writer Chris Watters discussed how endearing Missile was to him, citing the way his dialogue is expressed in capital letters and screen shaking as well as his devotion to his owners for this. He considered Missile one of the character highlights of 2011. Fellow GameSpot writer Shaun McInnis also considered Missile a highlight of the game, believing that any game that featured Missile would automatically enter his top 10 games of any year.

PCGamer writer Jody Macgregor called him the best dog in video games, a sentiment shared by GamesRadar+ staff, who regarded him as one of the best characters of its generation. Macgregor felt that he was part of why Ghost Trick became a "cult classic." Hobby Consolas writer also felt Missile was one of the best dogs in video games, noting that Missile stood out among a strong cast in Ghost Trick. Meristation writer Will van Dijk felt that, more than other characters, Missile exemplifies the humor and character in Ghost Trick. Anime News Network writer Jean-Karlo Lemus remarked on the passing of the dog Missile was based on, stating that Missile would stay in people's hearts forever.

Destructoid writers Chad Concelmo discussed his love of Missile with Concelmo feeling that he had a lot of personality. He also remarked about how surprising it was that he was so "complex and vital" to the plot due to how that was rarely the case with dogs in video games. He appreciated that he became a playable character, commenting that he hasn't loved a video game character as much as Missile in a long time. The revelation near the end of the game was also discussed, with Concelmo remarking that it made him sad to think of life without his own dog. Fellow Destructoid writer Allistair Pinsof considered him one of the best new characters of 2011, noting that while the game had multiple great character Missile stood out due to his loyalty and being "too adorable for his own good." GamesRadar+ writer Anthony John Agnello felt that Missile is what made Ghost Trick "so wonderfully distinct," feeling that Missile's quest to save his family by remaining a ghost helped elevate him. He also wished to see Missile get a starring role in any kind of video game, whatever it may be.

== See also ==
- Characters in Ghost Trick: Phantom Detective
