= Little Tail Story =

Online role-playing game

- Developer: CyberConnect2
- Publisher: Bandai Namco Games
- Producer: Ryo Mito
- Designer: Hiroshi Matsuyama
- Composer: Chikayo Fukuda
- Series: Little Tail Bronx
- Platforms: Android, iOS
- Release: JP: March 25, 2014
- Genre: Role-playing
- Mode: Single-player with multiplayer interaction

Little Tail Story (Japanese: リトルテイルストーリー, Hepburn: Ritoru Teiru Sutōrī) was a free-to-play online social role-playing game developed by CyberConnect2 and published by Bandai Namco for Android and iOS. It is the third title in the company's Little Tail Bronx series, acting as a spiritual successor to Tail Concerto and Solatorobo: Red the Hunter, and the first to appear on mobile devices. The project was headed by CyberConnect2's company president Hiroshi Matsuyama, and features music by Chikayo Fukuda with vocals by Tomoyo Mitani, who both previously collaborated on Solatorobo.

The game features a cast of anthropomorphic dogs and cats who must work together to battle monsters and obtain items, with its developer giving it the customized genre name "Dogs and Cats in RPG" (イヌとネコでＲＰＧ, Inu to Neko de RPG). It was released exclusively in Japan on March 25, 2014, and shut down on October 30.

== Gameplay ==
Little Tail Story is a 3D role-playing game presented from an overhead view where players undergo quests that involve exploring areas and battling monsters to obtain treasure. Players construct a party consisting of eight members, choosing from a variety of dog and cat species as well as a job class for each. During battle, enemies are arranged on a 3-by-3 grid, with each class having a specific attack radius. Only three party members may fight on the front lines at a time, but the player may rotate them in a circular fashion to change their positions, allowing them to hit enemies on certain panels. By defeating foes and completing quest objectives, items are obtained that may be crafted into stronger weapons and armor.

The original classes include Swordsman (剣士, Kenshi), who deal heavy damage to a single opponent; Knight (騎士, Kishi), who use lances to hit in a straight line; Guardian (衛士, Eji), who carry shields and attack in a horizontal line; Warrior (闘士, Toshi), who use hammers to attack a circular area; and Witch (魔法使い, Mahōtsukai) who can hit all enemies for light damage. Since the game's launch, three more classes were added: Fighter (武闘家, Budōka) who uses hand-to-hand combat to attack a single enemy; Gunner (砲術士, Hōjutsu-shi) who can target all enemies with a bazooka; and Hunter (狩人, Kariudo), who strikes all enemies in a straight line.

== Development ==
Since the release of Solatorobo: Red the Hunter in 2010, Cyberconnect2 had expressed interest in creating more games in the Little Tail Bronx series despite the low sales of its two previous titles. In January 2014, Namco Bandai Games published a Japanese trademark for Little Tail Story, along with the genre "Dogs and Cats in RPG", followed by a teaser website promising an upcoming mobile game between the company and CyberConnect2. On January 30, a trailer was released officially announcing the title, as well as a projected release date of Spring 2014 in Japan.

Little Tail Story was headed by CyberConnect2 company president Hiroshi Matsuyama, with Ryo Mito of Bandai Namco Games acting as producer. Matsuyama explained that he wanted the game to be a "casual" and "friendly" experience, and developed the title for smartphones to expand the series to a larger audience, both male and female. Music for the game was handled by composer Chikayo Fukuda and vocalist Tomoyo Mitani, collectively known as "LieN", who previously collaborated on the soundtrack for Solatorobo: Red the Hunter. The title's official theme song is Hikari no Mukō e (光の向こうへ, To The Other Side of Light), which was performed live one month before the game's release during LieN's "Voyage" concert event in Japan.

The game features costumes related to characters from Solatorobo, in addition to other Bandai Namco properties such as .hack, God Eater 2, and Tales of Xillia.
