= Characters in Ghost Trick: Phantom Detective =

Sissel, the main protagonist of Ghost Trick

Ghost Trick: Phantom Detective is a Nintendo DS video game developed by Shu Takumi in 2010. Like Takumi's other works, Ghost Trick has a strong emphasis on characters, while the plot's central theme is death and mystery. It stars Sissel, a ghost who is attempting to recover his memories. Other major characters include Lynne, who acts as a sidekick to Sissel and seeks to uncover a mystery of 10 years ago; Jowd, a detective accused of murdering his wife; Kamila, the daughter of Jowd; Missile, a Pomeranian who, after dying, chooses to stay dead so that he can protect his owner Kamila; Ray, a ghost who inhabits a desk lamp and initiates Sissel's journey; Cabanela, a detective and friend of Jowd who enjoys dancing; the Pigeon Man, the superintendent of the junkyard where the game begins; the Justice Minister, a man who the protagonists beseech to stay Jowd's execution; Yomiel, a ghost who seeks revenge for the events of 10 years ago; and the antagonists, an unidentified organization from a foreign country who seek to kill anyone involved in the events of 10 years ago.

Ghost Trick's main character Sissel was originally designed to be a spy, and was designed to be a ghost so he could better interact with the other characters. Ghost Trick features a number of tropes that are found in other video games by Takumi; one such trope is the sidekick to bounce jokes off of each other, namely Lynne. He compared her role to that of Dr. Watson in the Sherlock Holmes novels. Takumi explains that he was growing tired of 3D animation; as such, he created the style used in the game by creating 3D models and rendering them in 2D afterward, creating what Video Gamer's Martin Gaston describes as "buttery smooth" animation; this was as opposed to using motion capture technology, which Takumi feels would not allow characters to have their own quirks to their design.

The cast of Ghost Trick has received largely positive reception since appearing in Ghost Trick: Phantom Detective, both for their dialogue and design. In particular, Missile was called the most popular character in the game among fans by Takumi. The characters also received praise for most of them not being shoehorned into the plot, and for their unique personalities and attire. The characters have been compared to the cast from the Ace Attorney series, with 1UP.com's Justin Haywald calling them "over-the-top". The animation has been described as resembling that of a cartoon, and has been praised as having "some of the most impressive presentation work in the whole graphic adventure genre" by PALGN's Jarrod Mawson, "some of the most brilliant and unique visuals the DS has seen" by GameZone's Brian Rowe, and for being good enough to still be impressive if the animation was done on the technologically superior Wii and Nintendo 3DS by NGamer UK.

== Concept and creation ==
This visual style (compared to rotoscoping found in early 90s video games such as Out of This World) is given its smooth animation by making the characters in 3D and then rendering them in hand-drawn 2D sprites.

The characters in large part were created by Shu Takumi, who also created the game itself. The protagonist, Sissel, was originally conceived as a spy. The idea of making him a ghost came from unfulfilled ideas that the team could not accomplish in the Ace Attorney series; namely, the difficulty in delving into peoples' personal lives due to the format of the series being episodic. As such, he designed Ghost Trick to be one continuous story with a focus on characters, designing Sissel as a ghost to make it easier for him to interact with a large number of characters, arguing that a living character would have difficulty accomplishing this. One point made is the difficulty in entering a person's house as a living person, whereas as a ghost he can both interact and observe other characters. When asked of the creation of the game's characters, Takumi explains that he made them "weird and quirky" because he is curious, him giving examples of him wondering what a certain character he is writing will turn out like. He also used the ghost gimmick to allow him to go deeper into the characters, as opposed to his original plan to write back stories for every one of them. Takumi designed the writing to combine a serious story with humorous elements, specifically citing Lynne as a character he enjoys in the game due to how many times she dies yet still finds humour in her situation.

In an interview with Gamasutra, Takumi noted that when designing his games, he writes the stories before writing the characters. After the basic story is created, he creates characters to fill roles in the story. He adds that once he begins to write the scenarios for the game, the characters begin to take shape. When writing characters, he describes himself as writing a bit of himself into them, using this to accomplish his goal of making characters who fit the situation they are in but also feeling realistic. When designing the main character, Takumi desires to make said character identifiable to players, commenting that they can often act as the player, while the sidekick can drive the main character and by proxy the players to do something else. In particular, he likes to include sidekicks in his games to give the main character someone to talk to, explaining that in Japan, humour is often derived from dialogue. Specifically, such dialogue between the two characters is often jokes going back and forth to each other. He also attributes his interest in sidekicks to his love of mystery novels, specifically citing the character Dr. Watson, who acts as a sidekick to the character Sherlock Holmes in the series of mystery novels of the same name.

Takumi explains that the 2D style used in the game was used as a result of his boredom with three dimensional graphics. He adds that it was only "by chance" that he was able to succeed in creating such visuals, due to finding the right staff for the job. The first thing made as a sample with this style was "a scene of a girl eating a doughnut while a dog is running around beside her", which was what fully convinced him to use this style. When designing characters, Takumi ensures that the character presents a good silhouette, feeling that if the silhouette isn't memorable, the character's design will not leave an impression on players. He felt that this was particularly true for Ghost Trick, since it was about "small figures moving around".

While discussing the process of creating this style, Takumi noted the limitations that become apparent when trying to do this style in 3D. However, because he wanted to give it a smooth animation, he did a process wherein he made the 3D polygons and rendered them and the motions of the characters to 2D sprites. He additionally noted that instead of doing motion capture, all of the character designs were done by hand, discussing how each character is both realistic and yet features their own quirks, which could not have been accomplished as well with motion capture. Another advantage Takumi noted was having full control over the characters' actions, such as a scene mentioned by Joystiq of a girl backing into a fence and "glancing quickly" at it. He also gave criticism to some Western games' visual styles, describing them as broad versus what he describes as a level of sensitivity for nuances that Japanese people have according to Takumi.

== Characters ==
=== Sissel ===
Sissel (Note: Japanese: シセル, Hepburn: Shiseru) is the protagonist of the game, and the titular character as well. He is recently deceased, and as a ghost, attempting to recover his lost memories. He is tasked by a ghost nicknamed "Ray" with protecting a girl named Lynne from being killed. Ray teaches him of his powers, which include being able to manipulate objects, travel through phone lines, and go back in time to four minutes before a person's death. After rescuing Lynne, they eventually team up, with Lynne using Sissel to help her solve a mystery of 10 years ago and Sissel using Lynne to recover his memories. He later teams up with a dog named Missile who recently died and, when revived, goes to save his owners, Lynne and Kamila. Sissel is eventually tasked by Lynne to check on the schedule of a prisoner named Jowd, a former detective, only to find that he has none, as he is scheduled to be executed. After finding Jowd dead, he rewinds time to save Jowd, and he works to save him from prison, though Jowd is later arrested by his friend Cabanela in the process. Sissel works to not only stay this execution but to rescue Kamila from her kidnappers. He succeeds in staying the execution, and over time, learns that the person he believed to be him was actually a man by the name of Yomiel, a ghost who has the ability to manipulate people.

Sissel works with Missile, Lynne, and Jowd to rescue Kamila, the group boarding the submarine owned by the antagonists that Yomiel was working with to kill Lynne and Jowd. However, when Sissel enters, he learns that the antagonists have betrayed Yomiel by stealing a meteorite fragment from his body, which was responsible not only for Yomiel's body's inability to die, but also for Sissel and Missile's ghost powers. In order to save Lynne and Kamila from a sinking submarine, Sissel, Missile, Jowd and Yomiel travel back to the event of 10 years ago in order to avert Yomiel's death, which was caused by the meteorite fragment piercing his body while he was holding up Lynne after escaping from a police questioning room. The three of them, using their powers, prevent these events, with Yomiel possessing himself to protect Lynne and being arrested instead of being killed. After this point, Yomiel reveals to Sissel that Sissel is actually the ghost of a cat who he found at the scene of his death and took care of for 10 years; however, in the process of getting his revenge on those involved in his death, he inadvertently got Sissel killed shortly before the events of the game. Averting Yomiel's death successfully undoes the events of Ghost Trick, and Sissel becomes Jowd and Kamila's pet cat; however, he retains his abilities, as he was struck by a meteorite fragment in the new timeline.

=== Lynne ===
Lynne (Note: Japanese: リンネ, Hepburn: Rinne) is a detective and the caregiver to Kamila and the owner to Missile, a Pomeranian. She is targeted by multiple assassins sent by an unknown foreign country, and consistently gets in trouble, either from being suspected of murder or dying several times throughout the game. In the beginning, she and Sissel form a pact together of "using each other"; Sissel to recover his lost memories, and Lynne to solve a mystery from ten years ago. She eventually asks Sissel to halt the execution of Jowd, former detective and her mentor. It is later revealed that she was involved in the incident of ten years ago, as a hostage to a man who held her at gunpoint after escaping from a police questioning room and pursued by Jowd. During the investigation, Sissel and Lynne learn that Lynne was the one who killed Sissel, though neither recollects this. However, they eventually learn that she was manipulated into this by Yomiel, the ghost of the man from 10 years ago, seeking revenge on everyone involved. While traveling ten years into the past alongside Sissel, Missile, and Jowd, Yomiel eventually saves her and helps to undo the events of ten years ago, as well as the events of the game.

=== Ray ===
Ray (Note: Japanese: クネリ, Hepburn: Kuneri) is a ghost inhabiting a red swivel desk lamp. In the beginning of the game, he helps Sissel recover his memory by convincing him to save Lynne. He teaches Sissel how to use his powers, and informs him that he has only until dawn before his spirit will cease to exist, preventing him from recovering his memories. While he is not directly involved in the game’s plot, he appears at the end and reveals himself to Sissel to be the spirit of the dog Missile, though aged ten years. He reveals that he, like Sissel, attempted to undo the events of ten years ago in a past timeline; however, his limited powers made him unable to undo these events. As such, he waited ten years to find someone who could possibly do what he failed to do. While Sissel initially declined Ray's offer to help him out due to focusing on recovering his memories, Ray decided to lie about Sissel's spirit disappearing by dawn and telling him that Lynne holds the secret to his memories to make him act with more urgency.

=== Antagonists ===
Ghost Trick's primary antagonists encompass several assassins and other underhanded people working for an unstated foreign country who are identified by their blue skin. Players first see a member of this organization by the name of "Near-Sighted Jeego" (Note: Japanese: ド近眼のジーゴ, Hepburn: Dokingan no Jīgo), a man who has good aim when at close range, trying to kill Lynne, the sidekick to the protagonist, but is killed. Players later encounter Sith (Note: Japanese: シス, Hepburn: Shisu), a regal old man who is behind this attempted assassination, as well as his robotic servant, who has a very large build. Players again encounter an assassin by the name of "One Step Ahead" Tengo (Note: Japanese: 先回りのテンゴ, Hepburn: Sakimawari no Tengo), a rival to Jeego. He attempts to kill Lynne, but is thwarted and killed in a similar fashion to Jeego. Players also encounter a foreign agent posing as a doctor, who attempts to steal a corpse from a crime scene, but is found out by police inspector Cabanela. Finally, players encounter an apparent couple: a short, apologetic man named Dandy (Note: Japanese: ダンディー, Hepburn: Dandī) and a tall, domineering woman named Beauty (Note: Japanese: ビューティー, Hepburn: Byūtī), who kidnap Kamila, another important character to the story.

=== Kamila ===
Kamila (Note: Japanese: カノン, Hepburn: Kanon) is a young girl who is taken care of by Lynne, and who is often in the company of Missile. She initially enters the game when protagonist Sissel finds his way to her house to find her tied up, Missile dead, and an assassin waiting for Lynne; he works to revive Missile and hide the both of them to ensure that this does not happen. She is tasked by Lynne to bring a music box to her, but is mistakenly kidnapped by one of the game's antagonists to ensure the execution of Detective Jowd, her father, takes place. During these events, Missile dies yet again, though he gains special powers that allow him to swap objects, which he uses to protect people from dying, specifically Kamila and Lynne. Players learn that Kamila seemingly created a "murder machine" on her mother Alma's birthday: a Rube Goldberg machine originally intended to light a party popper was later modified by Yomiel to light an old-fashioned gun which shoots and kills Alma as part of his revenge plot; Kamila's father Jowd takes the blame to protect her. Sissel, Lynne, Jowd, and Missile all make their way to a submarine where Kamila is being held captive; there, Yomiel possesses Kamila and tries to kill Lynne to finish his revenge. However, he fails, and eventually Sissel, Missile, and Yomiel go back to the past to undo the events of 10 years ago, causing the events of the game to become undone—meaning her mother Alma comes back to life.

=== Missile ===
Missile (Note: Japanese: ミサイル, Hepburn: Misairu) is a Pomeranian who is first found by Sissel having been shot and killed in the process of planning to kill his owner, Lynne. However, he is revived by Sissel, who has the ability to avert peoples' deaths; after the killer leaves without killing him, he follows his other owner, Kamila, with the desire to protect her. In the process, however, he is inadvertently killed by a kidnapper who hits him with his motorized scooter. However, unlike before, Missile is granted with his own special ability to swap objects of similar shape. He and Sissel work together to use their powers, but instead of being revived again, Missile chooses to stay a ghost, wanting to use his powers to better protect Lynne and Kamila. However, he is blown away in the wind while possessing a leaf, and disappears until reappearing and reuniting with Sissel near the scene of a killing by a ghost named Yomiel. Missile and Sissel, at this point, begin working together to rescue the kidnapped Kamila. The two of them, along with Jowd and Lynne, go onto a submarine, where Yomiel and the antagonists are located. He and Sissel work to save Lynne and Kamila from a sinking submarine, and are aided by Yomiel in this task, who was recently betrayed by the other antagonists. He, Sissel, and Yomiel go back to an event from 10 years ago to save everyone, where Yomiel held a young Lynne hostage after escaping from a police questioning room. They work together to avert this event, which led to not only Yomiel's powers, but Sissel and Missile's as well.

After averting the fates of the people in these events, the events of Ghost Trick: Phantom Detective are undone as well. Eventually, Sissel learns that a character named Ray who taught Sissel about his powers in the beginning was actually Missile from an alternate timeline; in it, he was murdered by one of the assassins in the company of Yomiel, giving him ghost powers due to his proximity to the meteorite fragment. He attempts to enlist Sissel's help, but Sissel shows no interest, apologizing and leaving to find his memories. He goes through similar steps to rescue everyone like had been done by Sissel, but without Sissel and Yomiel's abilities, he becomes trapped in the event of 10 years ago, and waits until time goes back to where it was in the beginning of the game. At this point, he tricks Sissel into helping him by telling him that Lynne is the key to his memories, and that he has only until dawn before he ceases to exist, in order to get Sissel to help save Lynne and Kamila.

=== Justice Minister ===
The justice minister (Note: Japanese: 法務大臣, Hepburn: Hōmudaijin) is a man of power who is central to Detective Jowd's fate and execution. He is seen in-game as an extremely nervous person, to the point where he goes into incredible panic attacks. This is contributed to by his wife by the name of Emma, who left him with his daughter, Amelie, who is beside herself toward her mother because of this. Because she refuses to answer his phone calls at some point, when he learns that his daughter was apparently kidnapped to force him to not stay the execution of Jowd, he is unabled to check up on her, though it is revealed that it was Jowd's daughter Kamila, not his, who was kidnapped; players also learn that his wife left him over his decision to not stay the execution. Due to the stress of the apparent kidnapping, the justice minister dies of a heart attack, though this is reversed by Sissel. It is learned that he only signed the execution order when controlled by a ghost named Yomiel into doing so; this resulted in him becoming paranoid about being possessed, making him nervous and standoffish to anyone who approaches him. He eventually halted Jowd's execution.

=== Cabanela ===
Cabanela (Note: Japanese: カバネラ警部, Hepburn: Kabanera-keibu) is a detective working in the Special Investigation Unit, acting as the group's top investigator. He is noted for frequently dancing in nearly any situation, and is respected by his subordinates. While Jowd was responsible for looking after Lynne, Inspector Cabanela takes over once he was arrested for the murder of his wife. At this point, his goal becomes attempting to get further in his career, with the intention of gaining enough power to aide him in his investigation of Jowd's wife's murder, believing a man called the "manipulator" to be responsible. He investigates this alongside a man identified as the "pigeon man", a former medical examiner who quit to investigate the case full-time. He attempts to help Jowd, but only through legal means, forcing him to return him to prison after Sissel helped him escape. Sissel, to Cabanela's relief, has Jowd's execution stayed. However, he later calls the justice minister and demands that Jowd be executed once the manipulator gains access to him and forces him to do so; afterward, he kills Cabanela, though Cabanela is revived by Sissel after saving both the pigeon man and Cabanela by tricking the manipulator into thinking that they were dead.

According to Shu Takumi, Cabanela’s dancing animations were heavily inspired by Michael Jackson’s dance moves.

=== Pigeon Man ===
The pigeon man (Note: Japanese: コトリノロウジン, Hepburn: Kotori no Rōjin) is a superintendent who was a former medical examiner for the police department. He is an old bespectacled man with green hair and a blue pigeon who typically rides atop his head. After Jowd's wife was killed and Jowd accused of murder, he quit his job and became a superintendent of a junkyard so that he could focus on Jowd's wife's death full-time with Cabanela, specifically to discover the source of the powers of a ghost who has been manipulating people into doing things, believing in particular that this manipulator was involved in the death of Jowd's wife. As part of his research, he constructed a murder machine similar to the one that killed Jowd's wife. He and Cabanela later encounter the manipulator controlling a corpse, and though he is killed, the death of both him and later Cabanela by the manipulator's hands was undone by Sissel, who manipulated the situation so that the manipulator would believe that he had succeeded in killing them.

=== Jowd ===
Jowd (Note: Japanese: ジョード, Hepburn: Jōdo) is a detective who was charged with murder and sentenced to death by his own request. Lynne asks Sissel to check up on him, only to learn that he is to be executed the next day. He had apparently shot and killed his wife, and was seen painting an apparent portrait of Sissel. He was involved in the incident of 10 years ago, particularly saving Lynne from an escaped suspect who held her at gunpoint, but apparently was killed by Jowd, though it is later discovered that a meteorite fragment had killed him instead. While he was executed, his death was undone by Sissel. At this point, Sissel helps Jowd escape from prison to prevent another attempted execution, though he was apprehended by his friend Cabanela, though it is eventually discovered that Cabanela trusted him, and was merely trying to save Jowd "by the books" by bringing him to the justice minister to hopefully prevent his execution. However, it turns out that his daughter, Kamila, was mistakenly kidnapped instead of the justice minister's daughter Amelie in order to force the execution to happen. His execution is eventually stayed, and Jowd, Sissel, and Lynne go to save his daughter on a submarine. However, Jowd is killed, and forces Sissel, Missile, and Yomiel to go to 10 years in the past. In the process, they learn that a present for his wife by his daughter was manipulated so that instead of causing a party popper to go off, it would cause a gun to fire and kill her, as revenge for what Jowd did. After they undid the events of 10 years ago, this undoes everything that happened in the game, allowing Jowd to have a normal life with his wife and daughter.

=== Yomiel ===
Yomiel (Note: Japanese: ヨミエル, Hepburn: Yomieru) is the ghost of a man who died in an event 10 years ago. While his identity is unknown for a large portion of the game, it is eventually revealed that he is the ghost of the corpse that protagonist Sissel believed to be his. He is first seen controlling the corpse, killing both Cabanela and the pigeon man, as well as manipulating people in an attempt to kill everyone involved in the Temsik meteor crash or otherwise ruin their lives. It is eventually learned that a meteor fragment was what killed him, though the energy from it gave him special abilities, as well as make his corpse impervious to any pain or damage. It is also learned that anyone who dies near any of the meteor will gain similar powers. Among his crimes, he attempted to get Lynne arrested by manipulating her into shooting him, shortly before the events of the game; due to strong will, she is able to resist and misses, but the second shot hits. Another significant crime is the murder of Detective Jowd's wife by means of a complex device created by Jowd's daughter Kamila that normally sets off a party popper, but instead, lights an antique gun that kills Jowd's wife.

He collaborates with the antagonists to get his revenge, but is betrayed when they steal his meteorite fragment, taking his abilities. At this point, he helps protect Lynne and Kamila while the submarine sinks, and to try to save Jowd who was killed on the submarine, goes back to 10 years ago with Sissel and Missile. This event has him holding up a young Lynne after escaping from a police questioning room in a park; through manipulation, the three of them work together to not only prevent the meteorite fragment from hitting Yomiel, but also having Yomiel possess his past self and become injured to save Lynne. It is learned that he was a top systems engineer, and is arrested under suspicion of being a spy, and that his revenge was due to his fiancée killing herself after he died. In the process, he reveals to Sissel that Sissel was the ghost of a cat that he found at that scene, and that he took care of for the 10 years following. He was intending to leave the country with Sissel; after Lynne shoots him, he possesses Sissel to flee the scene. However, he eventually learns that Lynne's abovementioned misfire had killed Sissel. After the events of 10 years ago were undone, this caused the events of Ghost Trick to be undone as well, and in the new future, Yomiel had spent 10 years in prison before he was finally released.

== Reception ==
Since the release of Ghost Trick: Phantom Detective, the characters have received highly positive reception. Series creator Shu Takumi noted that, even more so than protagonist Sissel, Missile is the one who gained the most positive response in Japan. He describes him as "one of the more beloved characters in the series." 1UP.com's Justin Haywald described the characters as being "over-the-top", comparing them to those found in the Ace Attorney series though noting the lack of puns that the characters had in Ace Attorney. He adds that while Ghost Trick's characters have similar exaggerations and stylish clothing, they are much more "down-to-earth". Wired's Jason Schreier found numerous similarities between the two series' characters, calling Sissel "endearing in his brutal honesty and loyalty" and the other characters memorable, while also praising the dialogue as fantastic. The Telegraph's Tom Hoggins, while calling the characters unique, noted the similarities between the two cast of characters, noting the "colour playfulness" that is "thickly laced with dark tragedy and built on strong character." GameSpot's Carolyn Petit called the characters memorable, attributing this to their "snappy dialogue". Official Nintendo Magazine's Chris Scullion called the characters colourful, and praised the game's script. GamesRadar's Carolyn Gudmundson called the characters "many-layered", as well as praising them as being as good as the characters from Ace Attorney. She specifically cited Missile, who she describes as making her "heart hurt" with his devotion. Video Gamer's Martin Gaston noted that Sissel, an amnesiac, succeeds in ways that other amnesiac characters in video games do not.

GameTrailers praised the main character Sissel's "willing but skeptical personality", commenting that it allows players to enter an "unfamiliar world better". They go further and praise the secondary characters for providing a reaction, regardless of if the reaction is good or not. They gave specific praise to Missile, who they say is "practically guaranteed to win you over". GameZone's Brian Rowe called the characters empathetic, citing how even the most minor characters could have "distinctive mannerisms and powerful personalities". His only qualm was in how the narrative sometimes repeated the same thing in different wordings back-to-back, though noting it as "only a small slight". Despite the overwhelming reception, Game Informer's Joe Juba found the characters to not nearly be as able to enthrall him as the Ace Attorney series has, criticizing Sissel as "falling flat as a hero". IGN's Daemon Hatfield noted that the cast's characterization makes it obvious that it is developed in Japan, citing their flamboyance, exaggerated reactions, and awkward dialogue. He adds that while fans of Japanese adventure games would not mind the cultural barrier, others may not be as forgiving. RPG Fan's Kimberly Wallace called the characters "refreshing", as well as having several kinds of characters, ranging from "goofy", "suspicious", and "versatile" characters. She also praises the game for having "some of the best dialogue I've seen in a graphic adventure game." GamePro's AJ Glasser praised the characters' dialogue, describing it as particularly humorous. The Guardian's Chris Schilling described the characters as "gloriously idiosyncratic and the wry dialogue is similarly warm and witty."

Eurogamer's Dan Whitehead cited how Ghost Trick uses each character as an important aspect of the plot as opposed to a character with only comedic value for the game's "masterful plot". He also called the characters as memorable as previous video games developed by Takumi; he gave special mention to Cabanela, describing him as an "unforgettable, preening supercop whose Michael Jackson affectations and Kojak dialogue make him a meme waiting to happen." The Onion's John Teti praised Takumi for his character work, describing the characters as "flamboyant" and the dialogue "hyperactive", though he notes that he has "no filter on his self-indulgence," citing how the character Cabanela enters each scene with his "elaborate faux-Michael-Jackson dance". PALGN's Jarrod Mawson noted the characters and dialogue as part of the game's "heavy emphasis", describing the characters as "colourful and lovable". He adds that the collective cast's involvement in the story is not forced, and the number of characters is adequate.

In his first impressions of Ghost Trick, 1UP.com's Andrew Fitch was fond of Lynne's personality, calling her "spunky, charismatic," and a "likable foil" to Sissel. One of Famitsu's editors, in their preview, noted the conversations as one thing that impressed him. He specifically praised them for having a "real wit and tempo to them". Joystiq's JC Fletcher called the characters "flamboyant" and "bigger-than-life". Adventure Gamers' Steve Brown noted that while the striking visual quality of the characters may distract from the personalities, the main characters end up having complex personalities. The Washington Examiner's C-Ryan Vogt found the characters and dialogue less entertaining than those in the Ace Attorney series in terms of humour and drama, though specifically giving praise to Cabanela, describing him as "white-clad, dancing detective who seems to think he's Michael Jackson in the "Smooth Criminal" video". USA Today's Marc Saltzman commented that the adventure was "light-hearted" due to its "zany characters, silly dialogue and often-humorous death scenes".

=== Design ===
The character design, both in portraits and in their full-body designs, have received overwhelming praise for their fluidity of animation. 1UP.com's Justin Haywald described the portraits as "gorgeous", while the 3D models are "fluid, realistic, and graceful", comparing the rotoscoping style to older games such as Prince of Persia and Out of this World. Nintendo World Report's James Jones similarly praised the rotoscoping, calling it "some of the most organic movement in gaming". NGamer UK praised the style for providing "comedic life" for the characters, feeling that it would be impressive on the technologically superior Wii or Nintendo 3DS. GameSpot's Carolyn Petit called the animation "stunningly smooth and expressive", adding that it was "mesmerizing to behold and speak volumes about the characters themselves." One particular praise she gave was how the animation for each character matched their personalities. Official Nintendo Magazine's Chris Scullion found the animation to help players understand the personalities of the characters before they say anything, adding that the visuals improve the characters much more than they do for previous video games made by Shu Takumi. GameTrailers praise the game for its animation, feeling that it shows "plenty of personality" in the characters. Video Gamer's Martin Gaston called the animation "buttery smooth", comparing it to the rotoscoping technology of the 90s. He adds that it's "probably the only game I've ever played where a character walking down the stairs actually forced me to laugh out loud."

GameZone's Brian Rowe called the character's hand-drawn animation "some of the most brilliant and unique visuals the DS has seen." Game Informer's Joe Juba, while finding the characters and narrative to be strong enough to carry the game, found the animation to be "incredibly fluid and impressive". Wired's Jason Schreier called the animation "strikingly fluid", citing such examples as how assassins in the game "skulk around like shady criminals" and a prisoner who "flops out of bed like a beached whale". The Telegraph's Tom Hoggins, in addition to the similarity in characterization to that of the Ace Attorney cast, noted the similarities in design, including the "anime hairstyles" used in both. IGN's Daemon Hatfield commented that the animation was more fluid than in some cartoons, commenting that it is "probably the most impressive animation I've ever seen in a video game." RPG Fan's Kimberly Wallace called the character portraits "extraordinary" and in-keeping with the game's humour, citing Sissel's hair which she describes as resembling a lightning bolt; she further notes it for reminding her of her love for the film The Nightmare Before Christmas, which she also notes for having a cast of characters whose design stands out.

Eurogamer's Dan Whitehead noted that while Ace Attorney's manga-style had its charms, Ghost Trick's "beautifully animated characters" were a step up. While he noted that they were "little more than stylised stick figures", due to having little facial detail, their animation is a "joy to behold." He further compares it to earlier games such as Out of This World and Flashback. PALGN's Jarrod Mawson, while praising the story, noted the animation and presentation as the best part of the game. He finds that not only is the animation some of the best on the Nintendo DS, but also adds that "it wouldn't be a stretch to say the game has some of the most impressive presentation work in the whole graphic adventure genre." Game Revolution's KevinS praised Takumi for making "distinct" characters, including praise for each one moving in their own way; he specifically cited Cabanela, comparing his movements to that of Michael Jackson. He also compared it to the PlayStation Portable video game Exit in its visual style. GamePro's Tae K. Kim noted the visuals as interesting, calling them "anime-inspired". Kotaku's Brian Crecente called the art style "fanciful." Joystiq's JC Fletcher praised the 2D animation, which he calls the best he'd ever seen in a video game, for "imbuing each character with a unique physical presence". Adventure Gamers' Steve Brown praised the character animation as "stylish", specifically describing protagonist Sissel as "visually striking" due to his "bright red suit and sunglasses, with hair swept back to form a single huge blonde spike." The Guardian's Chris Schilling noted that in the lessened dialogue from previous Takumi games, the game fills the gaps in dialogue with the quality animation, commenting that it succeeds in "brilliantly capturing the emotions and mannerisms of the key players."
