= Nintendo DS (disambiguation) =

The Nintendo DS is a 2004 handheld video game system by Nintendo. Nintendo DS may also refer to:

- Nintendo DS Lite, the second iteration, released in 2006.
- Nintendo DSi, the third iteration, released in 2008.
- Nintendo DSi XL, the fourth and final iteration, released in 2009.
- Nintendo DS Browser, the Internet browser for the DS
- Nintendo DSi system software, the software for the DSi
- Nintendo DS sales

== See also ==
- Nintendo 3DS, the successor to the DS, first released in 2011
