= Ghost Trick: Phantom Detective =

2010 puzzle adventure video game

- Developer: Capcom
- Publisher: Capcom
- Directors: Shu Takumi; Atsushi Maruyama (Note: Directed 2023 remaster)
- Producers: Hironobu Takeshita; Shingo Izumi (Note: Produced 2023 remaster)
- Designer: Shu Takumi
- Programmer: Toshihiko Honda
- Artist: Koki Kinoshita
- Writer: Shu Takumi
- Composers: Masakazu Sugimori; Yasumasa Kitagawa (Note: Rearranged 2023 remaster soundtrack)
- Engine: RE Engine (Note: Used in development of 2023 remaster)
- Platforms: Nintendo DS; iOS; Android; Nintendo Switch; PlayStation 4; Windows; Xbox One
- Release: June 19, 2010: Nintendo DS; JP: June 19, 2010; NA: January 11, 2011; EU: January 14, 2011; AU: January 20, 2011 iOS; JP: December 16, 2010; WW: February 2, 2012 Android; JP: November 1, 2012; WW: March 28, 2024 Nintendo Switch, PS4, Windows, Xbox One; WW: June 30, 2023
- Genres: Adventure, puzzle
- Mode: Single-player

Ghost Trick: Phantom Detective (Note: Known in Japan as Ghost Trick (Japanese: ゴースト トリック, Hepburn: Gōsuto Torikku)) is a 2010 puzzle adventure video game developed and published by Capcom. The story follows Sissel, an amnesiac ghost with supernatural powers, and his journey to rediscover his identity. Players solve environmental puzzles, interact with eccentric characters, and uncover the truth of Sissel's death over the course of one night. Gameplay is split into two sections: gathering information by navigating through the city, and saving lives by traveling back in time.

Direction, writing, and game design were headed by Shu Takumi, creator of the Ace Attorney franchise. Development began after the Japanese release of Trials and Tribulations in 2004, with the goal of creating a mystery beyond what the conventions of Ace Attorney had allowed. The game was announced at TGS 2009, and released for the Nintendo DS in Japan in June 2010, and in North America, Europe, and Australia in January 2011. An iOS port released in Japan in December 2010, and internationally in February 2012. An Android port was released exclusively in Japan in November 2012.

Ghost Trick was positively received, with praise for its characters, art direction, animation, music, and story, and criticism for its puzzle design and traversal mechanics. Ghost Trick was a commercial failure in Japan, leading Capcom to cite its performance as a cause for lackluster Q1 2010 revenue. The game was nominated for several industry awards, including Game of the Year by GameSpot and Nintendo Power, and has garnered a cult following. An HD remaster released worldwide for Nintendo Switch, PlayStation 4, Windows, and Xbox One in June 2023, and for Android and iOS in March 2024.

== Gameplay ==
Ghost Trick is a single-player puzzle adventure video game. Players control the character Sissel, an amnesiac ghost with supernatural powers, over the course of one night. The story is divided into 18 chapters, each titled after the time of night in which they take place. At the start of the game, only the first chapter is available to play; when players complete a chapter, the next one is unlocked. Gameplay is split into two sections: gathering information by navigating through the city, and saving lives by traveling back in time.

Sissel manipulating a suit of armor with a ghost trick

Players can press the "Ghost" button to swap between the real world and the Ghost World—an alternate dimension in which time does not pass. In the Ghost World, Sissel takes the form of a blue flame, and can travel between nearby objects. Every interactable object contains a glowing sphere of essence called a "core". Players can swipe from core to core to explore the environment. In the real world, Sissel cannot move around, and relies on his ability to possess and manipulate objects: by pressing the "Trick" button, players can perform "ghost tricks", creating paths of traversal or influencing characters in the environment. For example, moving a cart of doughnuts may prompt a character to chase after it, while also giving Sissel access to new areas.

Possessing a telephone in use allows Sissel to trace the source of the call, add the number to his Phone Book, and travel to the location on the other end of the line. Additionally, certain locations have internal telephone lines, giving players the option to explore multiple rooms within a single area. As long as a functional telephone is nearby, players are free to return to any previously visited location. While moving from place to place, Sissel eavesdrops on characters' conversations and comments on his surroundings. As players interact with characters and discover locations, information about them is added to Sissel's record.

At multiple points in the story, players will arrive at the other end of a telephone line to discover the corpse of a character. By possessing the corpse, Sissel is able to communicate with the victim's spirit and travel back in time to four minutes before their death. During these "4 Minutes Before Death" segments, players are tasked with averting the victim's fate, using ghost tricks to manipulate the environment before time runs out. If players fail to rescue the victim, they can rewind time and return to the beginning of the sequence. If players manage to delay the fate of the victim, a checkpoint is created in the timeline. In later chapters of the game, players are able to control Missile, the ghost of a Pomeranian who befriends Sissel. 4 Minutes Before Death segments during these chapters increase in complexity, as Missile's spirit is able to reach further than Sissel's, and has the ability to swap the position of two objects that are of the same shape. Successfully averting a character's fate brings them back to life in the present. Rescued victims also develop permanent cores, allowing Sissel to talk directly with any character who has previously died. Conversations in the Ghost World resemble the investigation sections of Ace Attorney, providing players with a list of topics to choose from and lines of inquiry to follow.

== Plot ==
At 7:02 pm, an amnesiac spirit named Sissel regains consciousness in a junkyard. Seeing the corpse of a man nearby, Sissel concludes that he has just been killed. Ray, a spirit possessing a desk lamp, tells Sissel about the nature of spirits and "powers of the dead", including the power to travel back in time to four minutes before a person's death. Sissel uses these powers, called "ghost tricks", to save a young detective named Lynne from an assassination attempt. Sissel learns that Lynne came to the junkyard at his request, and decides that she is the only lead to uncovering his identity. Ray warns Sissel that his spirit will vanish at dawn.

Sissel and Lynne work together to save other victims as Sissel learns more about the past. Ten years prior, Detectives Jowd and Cabanela arrested Yomiel, a man falsely accused of foreign espionage. Yomiel fled into the nearby Temsik Park, taking a young Lynne hostage, but was killed by a fragment from the impact of a meteorite later named "Temsik". Jowd adopted Lynne into his family, including his wife Alma, daughter Kamila, and pet dog Missile. Five years later, Alma was inadvertently killed by a Rube Goldberg machine built by Kamila for a surprise party. Jowd hid the evidence and took responsibility for Alma's death to protect Kamila, going to prison under Cabanela's watch.

In the present, Sissel and Lynne discover that Sith, a foreign agent, was behind Lynne's assassination attempt. Sith claims to have kidnapped the justice minister's daughter as blackmail to hurry Jowd's execution, unaware that his subordinates mistakenly took Kamila instead. Sissel uses his powers to free Jowd from prison, though Cabanela soon recaptures him. Sissel proves the minister's daughter is safe at home, leading the minister to call off Jowd's execution. He tells Sissel and Lynne his fear that a spirit known as "the manipulator" is behind recent events, including Alma's death.

Cabanela is shot and killed while investigating Sissel's body. Missile, having died earlier and gained ghost tricks of his own, helps Sissel undo Cabanela's death. Sissel learns that his corpse was used by the manipulator to kill Cabanela and escape, and Cabanela reveals that the body actually belongs to the manipulator, Yomiel, whose corpse went missing shortly after his death. The body contained traces of radiation found in the Temsik meteorite, preventing it from decomposing.

Sissel, Missile, Lynne, and Jowd follow Yomiel aboard Sith's submarine, rescuing Kamila and cornering Yomiel. Sith betrays Yomiel, extracting the meteorite fragment from his body, and sinks the submarine after fleeing. Yomiel reveals that powers of the dead are granted to those who die in the presence of Temsik radiation. He had been working with Sith's organization to retrieve the Temsik fragment and eliminate all those who knew of its existence, including Jowd, Lynne, and Cabanela. Soon after his apparent death, Yomiel's fiancée—also named Sissel—committed suicide. Yomiel had come to work for Sith as a spirit, and was promised the means to lead a normal life once Sith had the fragment.

With no means of escape and dawn approaching, Sissel realizes that the group can travel to four minutes before Yomiel's death, as his corpse is no longer being preserved by Temsik radiation. Sissel, Jowd, Yomiel, and Missile all travel ten years into the past and prevent Yomiel's death, creating a new timeline. In the aftermath, Sissel discovers his true identity: a stray cat who had lived at Temsik Park ten years ago and who Yomiel adopted after his fiancée's suicide, having been killed when a stray bullet struck his cat carrier at the junkyard. Before returning to the present, Ray appears and tells Sissel the truth of his own identity: an aged Missile from an alternate timeline who failed to prevent Yomiel's death without Sissel's help and waited ten years to ensure his involvement, tricking him into believing he had only one night before disappearing.

In the new timeline, Sissel has been adopted by Jowd, Alma, and Kamila, while Yomiel serves out his prison sentence to rejoin his waiting fiancée. It is revealed that in this new timeline, Sissel was struck by the meteorite fragment instead, living as a spirit with the fragment in his body.

== Development ==
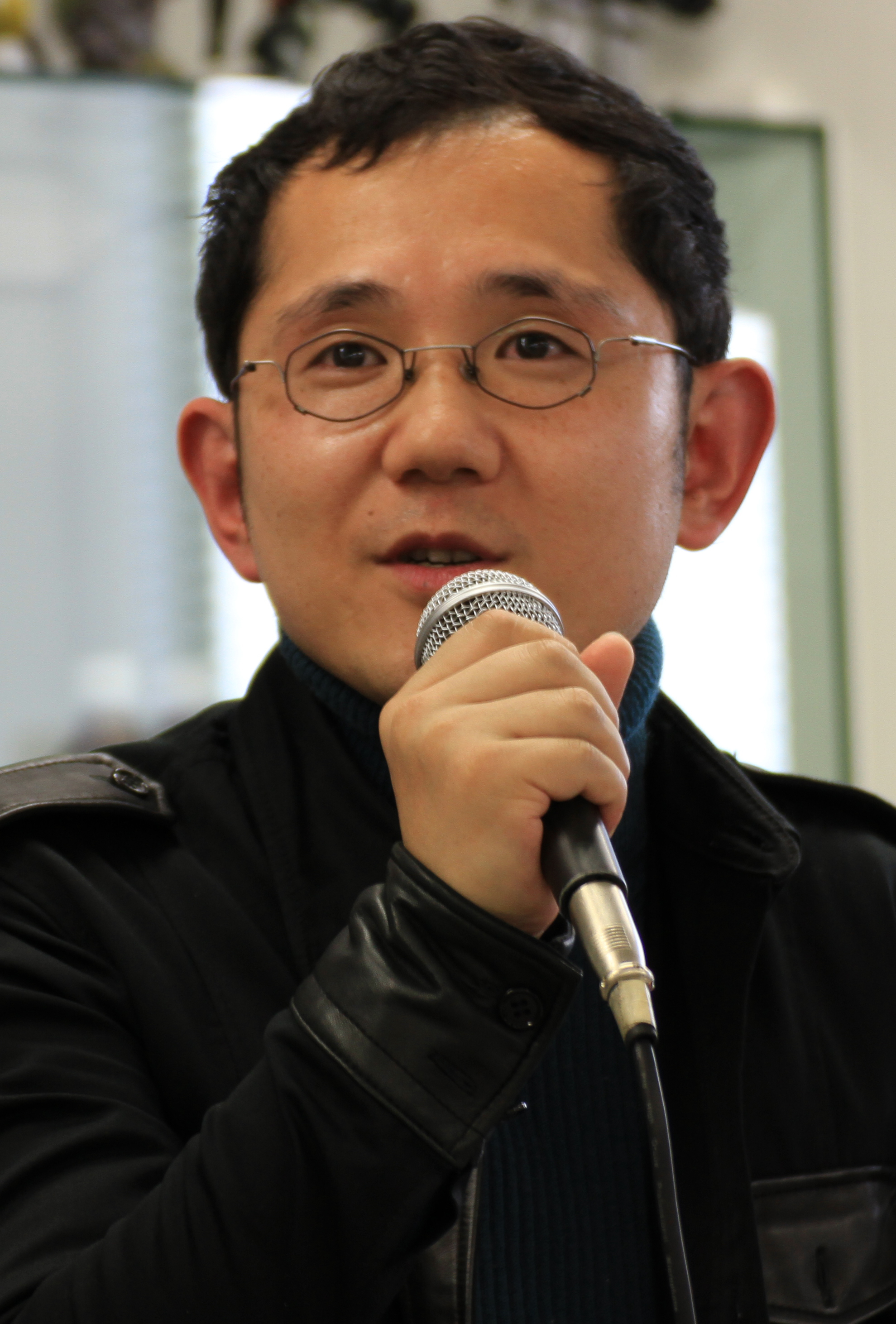
Shu Takumi at a 2011 blogger event promoting the Ghost Trick iOS release

Ghost Trick was developed over the course of six years by a team of 20, headed by Ace Attorney director Shu Takumi. Shortly after the Game Boy Advance release of Trials and Tribulations in 2004, Takumi stepped away from Ace Attorney to create a "new type of mystery" without the restrictions of the series' conventions. He drafted a rough storyline for the project—codenamed Mansion—centered around an ensemble cast of strangers. His priorities were shifted back to Ace Attorney later that year, split between porting the series to the Nintendo DS (DS), writing a fifth episode for the Phoenix Wright: Ace Attorney DS port, and supervising development of Apollo Justice: Ace Attorney. In October 2007, following the release of the Trials and Tribulations DS port in Japan, the project became Takumi's sole focus. He rewrote his original draft, dividing the story into chapters to make it easier to understand, and full-scale development began.

Takumi's initial design document was written for a "different portable console" capable of 3D visuals at the suggestion of Capcom, but was adapted for 2D graphics when development shifted to the DS. The game was tentatively titled Ghost Spy during pre-production, and tasked players with observing the behavior of mysterious apartment tenants from the perspective of a disembodied spirit. The game's Ghost mechanic was inspired by ideas Takumi could not fully explore with Ace Attorney's episodic format; namely, delving deeper into the personal lives of the game's cast. According to Takumi, forming meaningful connections with over 30 characters in a single night would prove "very hard ... [for] a character who is alive", and that the "best way is to have a ghost." As development progressed, the spy narrative was scrapped in favor of an amnesiac murder victim in search of answers, placing further emphasis on communication and interaction rather than observation. The title was eventually changed to Ghost Trick as a pun on toritsuku (取り付く), meaning "to possess", and the Japanese pronunciation of the English word "trick", or torikku (トリック).

=== Art and game design ===
Cabanela's walk cycle took a month to finalize, and was a favorite of the team's.

Ghost Trick's unique art direction resulted from Takumi's desire to create something that "looked more like an illustration than a game." The team prioritized bold colors, hard shadows, and distinct silhouettes to help character portraits and backgrounds stand out on the small screens of the DS. Characters were also modeled in 3D to populate environments, paired with dynamic animations to evoke the drama of a stage play. Exaggerated poses, deliberate choreography, and fluid motion were used to express the characters' individuality through movement, and to "[lend] an action element" that was not possible with the Ace Attorney series. Takumi insisted that characters be animated by hand, as he felt the use of motion capture would detract from their nuance and appeal. The team's first test sample—a short loop of Missile running around while Kamila snacked on a doughnut—convinced him that the process would be worth the effort.

Nintendo DS screens are not the largest ... [so] it became important to make sure that whatever death we were presenting to the player was visually easy to comprehend. So being crushed to death by some giant object was a perfect fit for our requirements, whether it was under a big rock or a huge roast chicken. ... That's probably the influence of Tom and Jerry on the young Shu Takumi showing through.

— Shu Takumi, director

Due to technical limitations, however, the team had trouble rendering the 3D character models properly on the DS hardware. At the suggestion of Toshihiko Honda—the game's lead programmer—pre-rendering techniques popularized by video games like Donkey Kong Country were used to rasterize the models into 2D sprites, preserving the quality of the animation while greatly reducing system load. The game's spotlight animation was also the result of hardware constraints. Takumi found that shifting from 3D development on Resident Evil and Dino Crisis to 2D development on Ace Attorney and Ghost Trick significantly limited the practicality of using in-game cameras to direct players' attention. This restriction, paired with Ghost Trick's theatrical design language, led to the creation of what Takumi called the "mysterious light" effect, placing emphasis on whichever character or object was pertinent to a given scene.

The original Ace Attorney trilogy was developed for Japanese audiences, and proved notoriously difficult for Capcom to localize for the West. According to Janet Hsu, the game's English editor, the team "knew [Ghost Trick] was going to be localized and ... took that into consideration" during development. Artists completely avoided using written language on buildings, objects, clothing, and other in-game assets. Character and location designs were also kept as culturally and chronologically ambiguous as possible. Apart from easing the localization process, this also gave what Takumi called a "fairytale-like" quality to the game's world. However, much like Ace Attorney, certain characters' names are Japanese puns, specifically relating to concepts of life and death: Lynne's name is derived from rinne (輪廻), (Note: Japanese word for the Buddhist concept of saṃsāra, or "reincarnation") Jeego's from jigoku (地獄), (Note: Japanese word for "hell") and Cabanela's from shikabane (しかばね), (Note: Japanese word for "corpse"; shikabane → Kabanera) for example.

Lynne and Kamila's living room was the first location created after development began, and served as a prototype for balancing difficulty and establishing the rules of the game's puzzles. Producer Hironobu Takeshita was often asked to playtest the game for the team, due to his relative unfamiliarity with puzzle games. To accommodate for a variety of skill levels, a passive hint system was implemented. Those who felt stumped had the option to read additional dialogue in the form of interactable thought bubbles, while experienced players could choose to ignore them. To aid in puzzle construction, the development team would reference a "foreign book" speculated to be Baby Einstein's Wordsworth's Book of Words. According to an interview with Joystiq, the book contained images of everyday objects paired with names and descriptions, and "whatever caught [Takumi's] eye" would become part of a puzzle.

=== Music and sound design ===
According to an interview with Gamasutra, the game's sound effects were written directly into the script. Takumi would leave notes at key story beats—detailing when and where to use sound effects—for programmers to reference at later stages in development. Yasumasa Kitagawa, who would go on to rearrange the soundtrack for the 2023 Ghost Trick remaster, assisted Takumi but ultimately went uncredited.

The game's soundtrack was written by Phoenix Wright: Ace Attorney composer Masakazu Sugimori. Takumi personally requested that Sugimori return, praising his "ability to create an original world" through music. Due to Takumi's hiatus from the project in late 2004, Sugimori was able to compose much of the game's score before development officially started. When full-scale production began in October 2007, he had already left Capcom to found Design Wave—a Tokyo-based music studio—but resumed work on the game as a contractor. Sugimori lists jazz and fusion as inspirations for the soundtrack, and wrote the game's title theme after seeing concept artwork of the Zone D Waste Center location. He was also heavily influenced by an untitled oil painting he owned of a black and blue night sky.

Ghost Trick Original Sound Track, a CD set of the game's soundtrack, was released under the Suleputer label on June 19, 2010 in a limited edition bundle via e-Capcom. It was later distributed digitally through iTunes to celebrate the game's third anniversary on June 19, 2013. In August 2015, Capcom released an artbook bundle, including a compilation album of the game's most popular tracks and an original song written and composed by Takumi titled "I Am Missile" (ボクはミサイル, Boku wa Misairu).

== Release ==
Capcom's Ghost Trick demonstration booth at TGS 2009

Ghost Trick was first revealed in Weekly Famitsu during an interview with Takumi in early September 2009. The game was formally announced at TGS 2009 later that month, featuring a demonstration booth themed after the Zone D Waste Center location. On February 12, 2010, Capcom filed a North American trademark for the game, leading several publications to suspect an overseas release date was imminent. On March 11, 2010, Capcom announced that the game would launch in Japan on June 24, 2010. The game made its first appearance in North America at Capcom's Captivate summit in April 2010, with an international release window of winter 2010. This was followed by showcases at Nippon TV, E3, San Diego Comic-Con, Gamescom, TGS, New York Comic Con, and CES.

In May 2010, Takumi created a Twitter account under the name "Ghost Tweet" to share exclusive development information and answer questions from fans. In June 2010, Capcom promoted the game on Ghost TV, a short YouTube docuseries in which Takumi and the production team would demonstrate gameplay and provide insight into their development process. Later that month, Capcom uploaded gameplay commentary videos featuring Japanese celebrities, including members of AKB48 and Yokohama F. Marinos, to the Ghost Trick website. Two tutorial demos with altered dialogue and puzzles were also made available; one via the Nintendo Channel and the other via Flash.

Takumi and Takeshita at a Ghost Trick launch event

Ghost Trick was originally scheduled to launch in Japan on June 24, 2010. However, to coincide with new colors and price drops coming to the DS family of systems, a last-minute announcement was made during the team's wrap party, moving the release date up to June 19. A limited edition bundle was distributed in Japan via e-Capcom, including Ghost Trick Original Sound Track and a full-color art booklet with exclusive developer commentary from Takumi, Takeshita, and Sugimori. In July 2010, the game was featured in a five-page cover story for Weekly Famitsu.

In November 2010, Capcom held a Ghost Trick t-shirt design contest, followed by a community webcomic contest in December. To promote the webcomic contest, Capcom commissioned popular artists to publish special Ghost Trick issues of their comics, including Ctrl+Alt+Del, PvP, Penny Arcade, and The Adventures of Dr. McNinja.

Ghost Trick released internationally in North America, Europe, and Australia the following year in January 2011, with Nintendo providing European marketing and distribution on behalf of Capcom. A bundle titled "Ghost Trick: Phantom Detective New Classics" was also made available, and included a copy of the then out-of-print Phoenix Wright: Ace Attorney DS port.

=== Mobile ports ===
An enhanced iOS port of the game was released in Japan on December 16, 2010, and internationally on February 2, 2012. Development started after localization of the international DS version was finished, and took just under three months to complete. The port began as an experiment, as the DS team had no experience developing for iOS. Instead of sending the source code to Capcom's mobile gaming division, Takeshita was impressed with the team's progress, and urged for development to continue in-house. Capcom initially planned for the game to launch episodically, with each chapter releasing one after another. However, according to Takeshita, "many fans finished the original in one go, and [the team] didn't want to make anyone wait." The first two chapters were distributed for free, with the remaining chapters costing extra.

The mobile version includes "Ghost Puzzle", a sliding puzzle minigame rewarding players with downloadable wallpapers, and a Japan-exclusive feature called "Missile Omikuji" (みさいるおみくじ, Misairu Omikuji), in which Missile would draw an omikuji fortune for players once a day. The game launched at #1 on the App Store in Japan, and held the position throughout its release week.

On September 15, 2011, Sony Ericsson revealed that an Android port of the game was scheduled to release for the Xperia Play, followed by a formal announcement from Capcom. It launched exclusively in Japan via the G-Game app store on November 1, 2012. The platform has since gone defunct following a merger in December 2017.

In December 2023, Capcom announced that the original iOS port of the game would be delisted from the App Store in spring 2024, along with plans to release the 2023 remaster on iOS and Android devices. The mobile version launched worldwide on March 28, 2024.

=== 2023 remaster ===
A re-release of Ghost Trick was rated in South Korea on September 2, 2022. The game was officially revealed to be a full HD remaster the following February in a Nintendo Direct, and a demo of the first two chapters was made available on June 12, 2023. To promote the game on Twitter, Capcom translated a collection of short stories previously exclusive to Japan called "Four Prologues", following Sissel, Lynne, Jeego, and Ray leading up to the events of Chapter 1. "Meeting Missile", an unreleased epilogue Takumi wrote in 2010, was also localized for promotional purposes.

The remaster launched on June 30, 2023 for Nintendo Switch, PlayStation 4, Windows (PC), and Xbox One, and for Android and iOS on March 28, 2024. A limited edition co-developed with escape room company Scrap was made available, including a unique box with reflective embossing and a board game designed by Takumi titled "Escape from the Toy Factory" (あるおもちゃ工場からの脱出, Aru Omocha Kōjō kara no Dasshutsu). A deluxe edition was also released, including everything from the limited edition plus Ghost Trick Original Sound Track 2023—a CD set of Kitagawa's rearranged soundtrack—and a deck of playing cards featuring character portraits. In September 2023, Capcom released the rearranged soundtrack on Spotify, Apple Music, and other music streaming services.

The remaster was developed using Capcom's RE Engine, and features upgraded visuals rendered in 1080p at 60 frames per second. As the development team was no longer restricted by hardware limitations, the remaster uses the high-resolution 3D character models that the original DS sprites were rasterized from. The remaster also includes the mobile Ghost Puzzle minigame, music and concept art galleries, customizable widescreen borders, support for nine languages, achievements in the form of "Challenges", a new song composed by Sugimori, and the ability to switch between the original and rearranged soundtracks during gameplay.

According to Takumi, conversations about revisiting Ghost Trick started in 2020. Yuki Kaji, who provided the voice of Ryūichi Naruhodō / Phoenix Wright in the Ace Attorney anime in Japanese, approached him about technical issues with the mobile version after the release of iOS 14. "[Kaji] said, 'The iOS version doesn't work anymore!' Due to an update, there was a period where it wasn't playable", Takumi told Famitsu. This prompted him to contact original producer Takeshita, setting discussions about the game's future in motion. Producer Shingo Izumi also cited fan requests as a driving factor in developing the remaster, saying, "With the tenth anniversary, and the [Change.org] petitions, Ghost Trick ranked first on a list of most-wanted remakes." Many of the original staff members who worked on the DS version remained at Capcom, and began development of the remaster in late 2021 with Takumi serving as a supervisor.

== Reception ==
Reception

Aggregate score
Aggregator	Score
Metacritic	(NDS) 83/100 (iOS) 87/100 (NS) 86/100 (PS4) 84/100 (PC) 90/100 (XONE) 84/100

Review scores
Publication	Score
1Up.com	A
Destructoid	8.5/10
Eurogamer	8/10
Famitsu	34/40
GameSpot	9/10
GamesRadar+	4/5
IGN	8.5/10
Nintendo Life	10/10
Nintendo Power	9/10
PC Gamer (US)	92/100
Pocket Gamer	4.5/5
Push Square	8/10
TouchArcade	4/5

Ghost Trick received "generally favorable" reviews, according to the review aggregator website Metacritic. The 2023 remaster received "universal acclaim" on PC and "generally favorable" reviews on consoles. The game is considered to be a cult classic.

The game's story and characters were highly praised. GameSpot's Carolyn Petit said the "comic absurdity" of the plot cleverly spins its tragic themes into comedic moments, and that story beats culminate in a rewarding and memorable conclusion. She also found interacting with the game's characters entertaining, admiring their snappy and engaging dialogue. Carolyn Gudmundson of GamesRadar+ found the characters endearing and many-layered, comparing them favorably to the Ace Attorney cast. Gudmundson also called the game's storytelling "Takumi's best work to date", noting Missile in particular as a standout example of character writing. Echoing the sentiments of Gudmundson, Justin Haywald of 1Up.com called Ghost Trick's story a "creative extension" of Ace Attorney that successfully expanded on the core ideas of the franchise. John Teti of The A.V. Club lauded the game's complex approach to mystery, likening it to the Professor Layton series, but found that the thought bubble hint system often interrupted suspenseful moments.

Writing for IGN, Daemon Hatfield highly praised the game's art direction and animation, calling it "the most impressive ... [he had] ever seen" in a video game, and the best reason to play it. Dan Whitehead of Eurogamer favorably compared the art style to the works of Éric Chahi, citing Out of This World in particular. He also thought that the theatrical character animation complemented the dramatic stylization of the game's scenery. GameSpot's Petit found that the game's exaggerated approach to animation "[spoke] volumes" about the characters, and helped them stand out against the game's various background environments. Mark Brown of Pocket Gamer also commented on the strong characterization of the animation, praising the game's ability to reveal insight through actions rather than dialogue. Nintendo Life's Kate Gray said that the 2023 remaster successfully and faithfully translated the game's visuals to HD, but criticized the pillarboxing that resulted from retaining the DS version's original 4:3 aspect ratio.

Critics were divided on the game's puzzle design and traversal mechanics. 1Up.com's Haywald thought the puzzles were novel and fun, but occasionally found the "trial-and-error process" of deducing solutions frustrating. He also expressed disappointment in the seemingly limitless potential of interactable objects often having a single, linear route. Cassandra Khaw of TouchArcade praised the game's rewind mechanic, finding that the ability to restart at any point prevented 4 Minutes Before Death segments from becoming too unforgiving. Push Square's Stephen Tailby found the puzzles gratifying to complete, despite their relative simplicity and mild difficulty. Nick Chester of Destructoid largely enjoyed the puzzles, comparing them to the board game Mouse Trap, and found them "full of 'ah-ha!' moments" and satisfying outcomes. He also faulted them for their linearity, however, citing a lack of creative freedom afforded to players. GamePro's AJ Glasser took issue with certain late-game puzzles requiring that players wait until the last second to determine the correct solution. Writing for Game Informer, Joe Juba found the spacing and placement of checkpoints inconsistent, warning that players should expect to rewatch cutscenes and repeat ghost tricks multiple times before solving a puzzle. Jason Schreier of Wired was highly critical of the game's traversal mechanics, and found moving from scene to scene "eternally frustrating ... due to a constricting gameplay mechanic."

=== Sales and accolades ===
Ghost Trick debuted at #2 on the Media Create sales charts, and sold 44,000 physical copies by the end of its release month. According to the 2011 edition of Video Game Industry White Paper, the game sold a cumulative total of 81,325 physical copies in Japan by December 2010. Capcom has cited the game's poor performance in Japan as a contributor to low income in the first quarter of its 2010 fiscal year. Publications have speculated that sales were negatively affected by releasing the game at the end of the DS life cycle, and that it was overshadowed by the announcement of the Nintendo 3DS. The iOS version debuted at #1 on the App Store, and "performed well" according to Capcom's 2011 annual report. The Nintendo Switch version debuted at #5 on the Famitsu sales charts, and sold 10,449 physical copies by the end of its release month.

GameTrailers awarded Ghost Trick Best Nintendo DS Game, and nominated it for Best Story. It won Best Handheld Game from GameSpot, and was nominated for the award by X-Play. GameSpot also named it Best Puzzle Game, while nominating it for Game of the Year. It received the award for Best DS Game of E3 2010 from Kotaku and Jeuxvideo.com, and was nominated for the award by 1Up.com, GameSpot, and GameTrailers. It was named Nintendo DS Game of the Year by GameZone, and received a nomination for the award from Nintendo Life. The game was included in the GamesRadar+ list of the "Best DS Games of All Time", Game Informer's "Top 50 Games of 2011", and Adventure Gamers' "Top 100 All-Time Adventure Games". The 2023 remaster earned a Game of the Year staff award from Nintendo Life.

Year	Award	Category	Result	Ref.
2009	Japan Game Awards	Future Division	Won	
2010	Game Critics Awards	Best Handheld Game	Nominated	
2011	Japan Media Arts Festival	Jury Selections	Won	
2011	Golden Joystick Awards	Best Action/Adventure Game	Nominated	
2011	Golden Joystick Awards	Best Strategy Game	Nominated	
2011	Spike Video Game Awards	Best Handheld/Mobile Game	Nominated	
2012	39th Annie Awards	Best Animated Video Game	Nominated	
2012	Aggie Awards	Best Story	Nominated	
2012	Aggie Awards	Best Character	Nominated	
2012	Aggie Awards	Best Gameplay	Nominated	
2012	Aggie Awards	Best Concept	Nominated	
2012	Aggie Awards	Best Graphic Design	Nominated	
2012	Aggie Awards	Best Console/Handheld Adventure	Won	
2012	Aggie Awards	Best Non-Traditional Adventure	Nominated	
2012	Aggie Awards	Best Adventure of 2011	Nominated	
2012	Nintendo Power Awards	Overall Game of the Year	Nominated	
2012	Nintendo Power Awards	Nintendo DS Game of the Year	Won	
2012	Nintendo Power Awards	Best Nintendo DS Graphics	Won	
2012	Nintendo Power Awards	Best Adventure Game	Nominated	
2012	Nintendo Power Awards	Best New Character	Nominated	
2012	Nintendo Power Awards	Best Story/Writing	Won	
2012	Nintendo Power Awards	Best New Idea	Nominated	
2012	15th Annual Interactive Achievement Awards	Handheld Game of the Year	Nominated	
2012	NAVGTR Awards	Character Design	Nominated	
2024	New York Game Awards	Freedom Tower Award for Best Remake	Nominated	

== Legacy ==
In November 2011, Capcom released Ultimate Marvel vs. Capcom 3, an updated version of Marvel vs. Capcom 3: Fate of Two Worlds introducing Ace Attorney's Phoenix Wright and Maya Fey in their fighting game debut. One of the duo's alternate costume sets is themed after the color schemes of Sissel and Lynne, respectively.

In December 2017, Capcom released a free content update for Dead Rising 4 called "Capcom Heroes", giving players 17 new outfits based on the studio's video game franchises, each with their own attributes. This mode includes a Sissel costume, and allows the main character, Frank West, to possess everyday objects and use them to attack enemies.

In a June 2023 Game Informer interview, Takumi said that developing a Ghost Trick sequel would be difficult, and considers Sissel's story complete, but thinks that the powers of the dead introduced in the game hold untapped potential. Producer Izumi suggested that the commercial success of the remaster would ultimately determine the likelihood of a sequel, but that he is open to the possibility.
