= Solatorobo: Red the Hunter =

2010 video game

- European cover art featuring Red Savarin in both his Caninu and Trance forms respectively (center left to center)
- Developer: CyberConnect2
- Publishers: WW: Namco Bandai Games (Note: Released under the Bandai label in Japan.); NA: Xseed Games
- Director: Takayuki Isobe
- Producer: Rio Nakata
- Designers: Takayuki Isobe; Yasuhiro Noguchi; Hisashi Natsumura
- Artists: Nobuteru Yūki; Yoshitake Taniguchi
- Writer: Yasuhiro Noguchi
- Composer: Chikayo Fukuda
- Series: Little Tail Bronx
- Platform: Nintendo DS
- Release: JP: October 28, 2010; EU: July 1, 2011; NA: September 27, 2011; AU: November 24, 2011
- Genre: Action role-playing
- Modes: Single-player, multiplayer

Solatorobo: Red the Hunter, originally released in Japan as Soratorobo -Sore Kara Kōda e-, (Note: Japanese: ソラトロボ -それからCODAへ-, Hepburn: Soratorobo -Sore Kara Kōda e-; lit. "Solatorobo: And Then, to CODA") is an action role-playing video game developed by CyberConnect2 and published by Namco Bandai Games for the Nintendo DS. Originally released in Japan in October 2010, an English version was released in Europe in July 2011 and Australia the following November, with a North American release in September by Xseed Games. It is the spiritual sequel to Tail Concerto, and, like its predecessor, features artwork and character designs by manga artist Nobuteru Yūki and music by Chikayo Fukuda. The game includes animated cutscenes produced by Madhouse, as well as vocal themes performed by Tomoyo Mitani.

Set in a steampunk fantasy world of floating sky islands populated by anthropomorphic dogs and cats, dubbed "Caninu (Note: イヌヒト, Inuhito; Dog people)" and "Felineko (Note: ネコヒト, Nekohito; Cat people)", respectively, the game focuses on a canine freelance adventurer named Red Savarin who pilots a flying mecha. On a seemingly ordinary task to fetch a stolen file, he encounters a mysterious young Felineko named Elh, and becomes involved in a series of events that reveal the hidden truth of the origin of his world and those who live in it.

== Gameplay ==
Solatorobo uses a mix of 3D and 2D graphics.

Solatorobo is an action role-playing game where players control Red, an adventurer who pilots his own small mecha equipped with long arms that can grab and throw objects or enemies. Red can throw enemies into one another, as well as repeatedly toss and re-throw the same enemy in a combo to deal extra damage. Each time an enemy is defeated, Red gains experience points that allow him to gain levels, making him stronger and increasing his health. His mecha can be upgraded and customized by purchasing parts with currency called "rings", which consist of simple geometric shapes that fit into slots unlocked by finding "P. Crystals" throughout the game. As the story progresses, he gains new offensive abilities such as swinging an opponent around or firing projectiles. The player may also allow Red to exit his machine at any time, giving him the ability to swim, climb ladders, activate panels or switches, and immobilize enemies with his stun gun.

Players advance the story by making it to the end of each new area, often solving puzzles and defeating enemies along the way. In addition to the main narrative, players must also complete a number of side quests to increase their "hunter rank", allowing them to gain access to new parts of the main storyline. A total of 83 quests exist in the game, which often require the player to find items, perform tasks for townsfolk, or play minigames. While 12 of these quests were only available as downloadable content in the Japanese and PAL versions, the North American release contains all of them on the game card from the start. The game also includes a multiplayer racing mode called Air Robo GP, which can be played over the Nintendo Wi-Fi Connection.

== Story ==
=== Characters and setting ===
Solatorobo takes place in the Shepherd Republic, a series of floating islands traversed by airships and small personal mechas. French is the dominant language, incorporated into the setting to lend it a "European flair". The characters of the game consist of anthropomorphic dogs known as "Caninu" and anthropomorphic cats known as "Felineko". Players control the titular Red Savarin (Note: レッド・サハラン, Reddo Saharan) (voiced by Tetsuya Kakihara), a 17-year-old Caninu who makes his living as a Hunter, a type of mercenary. Characterized as an "alpha dog", he suffers from amnesia and pilots the robotic Dahak throughout the game, which serves as his primary weapon and means of travel. He is accompanied by his adoptive sister Chocolat Gelato (Note: ショコラ・ジェラート, Shokora Jerāto) (voiced by Kana Asumi), a mechanically-minded Pomeranian Caninu who supports him over Dahak's communication system. Much of the story revolves around Red's relationship with Elh Melizée (Note: エル・メリゼ, Eru Merize) (voiced by Saori Gotō), a mysterious American Shorthair Felineko he encounters on an early mission, with her gender initially left ambiguous. In the second course, Red also met Yurlungur (Note: ユルルングル, Yururunguru) (voiced by Mari Todo), the last remaining Juno on Earth who is aware of the actions of the Hybrids.

The principal antagonists include members of the Kurvaz Guild, an organization that uses blackmail and intimidation to get what they want, and plan to unleash an ancient evil force called Lares. Led by the German Shepherd Caninu Bruno Dondurma (Note: ブルーノ・ドンドルマ, Burūno Dondoruma) (voiced by Shigenori Sôya), his associates, known as the Kurvaz Special Operations Unit, include Opéra Kranz (Note: オペラ・クランツ, Opera Kurantsu) (voiced by Ryōka Yuzuki, a Russian Blue Felineko who pilots the Robo known as Tiamat; Gren Sacher (Note: グレン・ザッハー, Guren Sahhā) (voiced by Hiroshi Tsuchida), a Kishu-Inu Caninu in command of the Mephisto; and Calua Napage (Note: カルア・ナパージュ, Karua Napāju) (voiced by Taisuke Yamamoto), an ocelot Felineko who rides the OverMephisto. They are assisted by Bruno's secretary Merveille Million (Note: メルヴェーユ・ミリオン, Meruvēyu Mirion) (voiced by Emi Shinohara), a Collie Caninu, as well as Béluga Damiens (Note: ベルーガ・ダミアン, Berūga Damian) (voiced by Satoshi Katougi), a lynx breed Felineko bounty hunter who flies the Salamander and becomes a rival of Red's. In the game's second course, Red and the others encounter a new organization called Hybrids, composed of both Blanc (Note: ブランク, Buranku) (voiced by Nozomu Sasaki), a male human hybrid who rides the Srvara and Nero (Note: ネロ, Nero) (voiced by Kae Araki), a female human hybrid who pilots the Zairita. Both of them take orders from Baion (Note: バイオン, Baion) (voiced by Tomohiro Tsuboi), the leader and pilot of the robo Berius, who awoke prematurely from his cold sleep to initiate Operation CODA.

=== Plot ===
The story of Solatorobo is divided into two parts, with the first focusing on the conspiracy of the organization Kurvaz. Red Savarin is tasked with retrieving an important file that has been stolen. To retrieve it, he boards a massive airship called the Hindenburg, deep within which he finds a mysterious medallion. Suddenly, a gigantic creature called Lares rises up through the plasma sea beside the ship and heavily damages the Hindenburg. As Red makes his escape from the burning Hindenburg he runs into a mysterious Felineko child, who has passed out. At risk of his own life, Red carries the child out of the ship onto his personal craft, the Asmodeus, where he learns the child's name to be Elh. Before he knows it, Red finds himself in a journey across the Shepherd Republic to uncover the mysteries of the medallion and stop Bruno from controlling Lares.

The second part of the story focuses on Red's origins as a Hybrid and the mysterious operation known as "Operation CODA" (known as Continent Orientation Defloat Alignment). Shortly after defeating Lares, Red and his friends first encounter and are attacked by Blanck and Nero, human-like Hybrids who first attacked parts of the Shepherd Republic. Despite Red's efforts to defend against the attacks of Blanck and Nero, he was no match for them. Following the confrontation, Red learns from Merveille that he has the ability of Trance, which allows him to turn into a human. Along with discovering his ability to enter Trance, Red also discovers that Merveille, through previous involvement in Operation CODA, rescued him 9 years ago - as an unwanted by-product of an experiment to create Hybrids for use in Operation CODA, in which Red was deemed a "failure" and labelled to be disposed of. Soon after Red finds out the truth, Baion, a human Hybrid who was awakened prematurely from his sleep and the creator of Blanck, Nero and Red, starts initiating Operation CODA. Red eventually learns that their world is Planet Earth and was once inhabited by humans. But the obtainment of mysterious entities called Juno by humans caused the extinction of the human race due to their greed for knowledge. They also learned that Baion's plans for Operation CODA are to summon Tartaros and reset Earth by eradicating the current civilization. Red and his friends must do everything to stop Operation CODA and Baion before their world is destroyed.

== Development ==
Solatorobo was first teased in 2007 by an artwork on CyberConnect2's website. The game was later revealed in March 2010 under the title "Solarobo" by the Japanese video game magazine Famitsu with the release coinciding with the 15th anniversary of the studio. Part of the staff working on the title include Hiroshi Matsuyama and Takayuki Isobe as the directors, Nobuteru Yūki, who previously worked for Tail Concerto, as the character designer, Yoshitake Taniguchi of Super Robot Wars fame for mecha designs, and Madhouse for the opening movie. The game was presented at Japan Expo 2010 in France under the title "Project Coda". The demo was translated into French, which raised rumors of a western release. A release for Europe (including Russia and Turkey) and other countries (South Africa, Australia, and New Zealand) was confirmed by Nintendo in April 2011, and was released on July 1, named Solatorobo: Red The Hunter. The game was released on October 28, 2010 in Japan with a normal and a collector's edition, the collector's edition includes an artbook, a soundtrack CD and a "Prelude disc" DVD for the purchase of the game. Namco Bandai aired 100 commercials of Solatorobo on 21 October on the TV channel Tokyo MX and set the Guinness World Record at 8 hours for, “Most TV commercials for the same product”.

Xseed Games released Solatorobo in North America on September 27, 2011. Nintendo distributed physical copies of the game in Europe for Namco Bandai on July 1, 2011.

=== Audio ===
The music for Solatorobo was composed by Chikayo Fukuda, who previously wrote the soundtrack for Tail Concerto as well as titles in CyberConnect2's .hack series. She collaborated with singer Tomoyo Mitani under the group name "LieN", with Mitani performing the game's opening and ending theme songs "And Then, to CODA" (それからCODAへ, Sore Kara CODA e) and "Re-CODA", respectively, as well as the insert song "Nagareboshi ☆ Kirari" (流れ星☆キラリ, Shooting Star ☆ Kirari). A soundtrack featuring a selection of 24 songs was packaged with the limited edition of the game in Japan, as well as the standard edition North American version by Xseed Games. In October 2012, an official commercial soundtrack called the Solatorobo Perfect Soundtrack (ソラトロボ パーフェクトサウンドトラック, Soratorobo Pāfekuto Saundotorakku) was released in Japan by Namco Bandai Games, which featured 80 songs across two discs.

== Reception ==
Reception

Aggregate scores
Aggregator	Score
GameRankings	75.87%
Metacritic	76 / 100

Review scores
Publication	Score
1Up.com	B−
Eurogamer	8 / 10
Famitsu	33 / 40
Game Informer	7.5 / 10
GameSpot	7.5 / 10
IGN	8 / 10
Nintendo Power	9 / 10

The title received a total score of 33 out of 40 from Japanese magazine Weekly Famitsu based on individual reviews of 9, 8, 8, and 8, earning it the publication's Gold Award. Initial sales were low in the region, however, with the game entering the Media Create software charts as the seventh most-bought title in its debut week with 21,915 copies, and it would go on to sell approximately 100,000 copies worldwide.

Solatorobo earned mostly positive ratings in Europe and North America, with a 75% average score on aggregate review website GameRankings, and a 76 out of 100 from Metacritic, and game's overall bright tone and presentation were generally praised by critics. Some, such as Nintendo Power, remarked that the title went against the then-current video game market trend of "brooding teenagers and grim space marines" calling it "a game that captures the bold, experimental spirit of the NES era with some of the finest production values seen on the Nintendo DS". However, criticism was reserved for its lack of challenge and over-abundance of dialogue, stating that "its 20-hour quest is padded with a few more conversation scenes than it needs". 1UP.com similarly felt that Solatorobo's pace was hindered by too much text, calling it "an excellently localized treat to read, full of life and never clumsy; unfortunately, the game's major issue is that it just doesn't know when to shut up". While reviewers such as Destructoid found the gameplay as a whole to be "repetitive" and "mediocre", it commented that Solatorobo's unique visual style and well-produced cutscenes could have been the foundation for an animated film.

Solatorobo was nominated for DS Game of the Year, Best Adventure Game, Best Story/Writing, Overall Game of the Year, and Best New Character for "Red the Hunter" in the 23rd annual Nintendo Power awards in 2011. The magazine would later rank the game as the 268th greatest title released for a Nintendo console in its December 2012 farewell issue. IGN would also nominate the game for "Best 3DS/DS Role-Playing Game" during its "Best of 2011" awards feature.

== Legacy ==
A light novel adaptation of Solatorobo named Red Data Children was published in Dragon Magazine. The novel is a prequel to the main game, taking place seven years before the title's main storyline, and was written by Daishi Kitayama and illustrated by Dmyo. In November 2012, CyberConnect2 president and CEO Hiroshi Matsuyama revealed at a Bandai Namco press event in Barcelona that his company was interested in developing a follow-up to Solatorobo, confirming they had a story ready despite no finalized platform or release window. The mobile phone game Little Tail Story, set in the same universe, was later released in Japan in March 2014, with Red Savarin making a cameo appearance as a playable character in a July 2014 event. That same year, characters from Solatorobo also appeared in the Japanese mobile game Road to Dragons by Acquire Corp.

A proper prequel, only titled Fuga: Melodies of Steel was teased by Hiroshi Matsuyama on the February 2018 issue of Famitsu as part of the Vengeance series. This game is set 700 years before the events of Solatorobo and Tail Concerto. The game was released in July 2021.
