= Party popper =

Pyrotechnic device used at parties

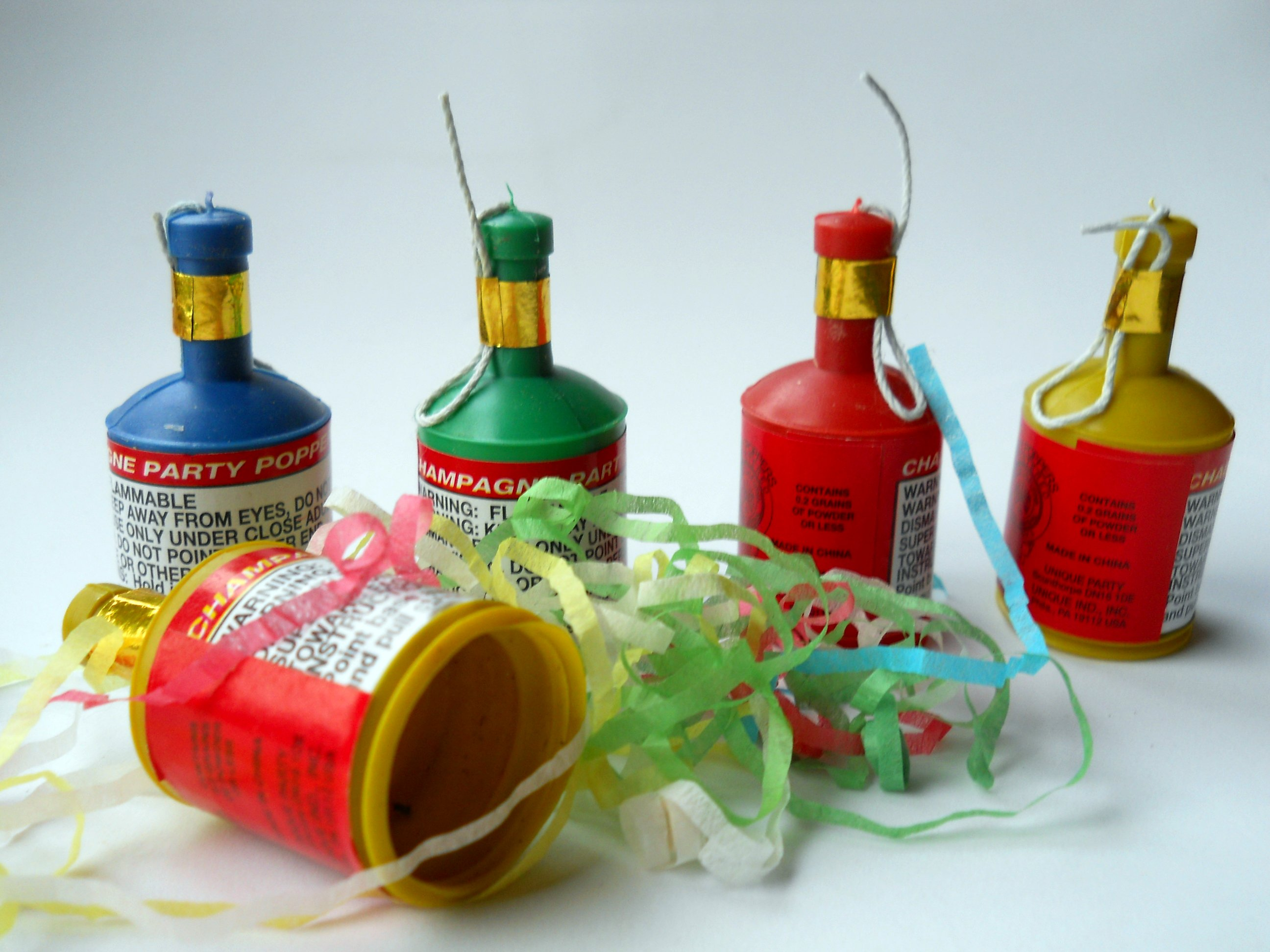
Party poppers

A party popper is a handheld pyrotechnic device commonly used at parties. It makes a loud popping noise by means of a small, friction-actuated explosive charge that is activated by pulling a string. The explosive charge comes from a very small amount of Armstrong's mixture (a highly sensitive explosive) in the neck of the bottle-like shape. In some party poppers, the explosive charge is replaced by compressed air. In party poppers with an explosive charge, there are less than 0.25 grains (0.016 g) of explosive. The streamers are non-flammable for safe use. The charge or compressed air blows out some confetti or streamers and emits a popping sound. The charge is often composed of red phosphorus and strong oxidizer, such as potassium chlorate and potassium perchlorate.

There are also party popper revolvers on the market, which use a Speedloader-style cartridge filled with six-party popper charges inserted into a normally colourful plastic device loosely resembling a pistol or revolver. Its functionality is very much the same as a pistol; the depression of the trigger apparatus rotates the chamber so that a live charge is presented to a hammer, which falls onto a regular cap ring embedded in the bottom of the chamber. The chambers are one-time use only.

== Safety and precautions ==
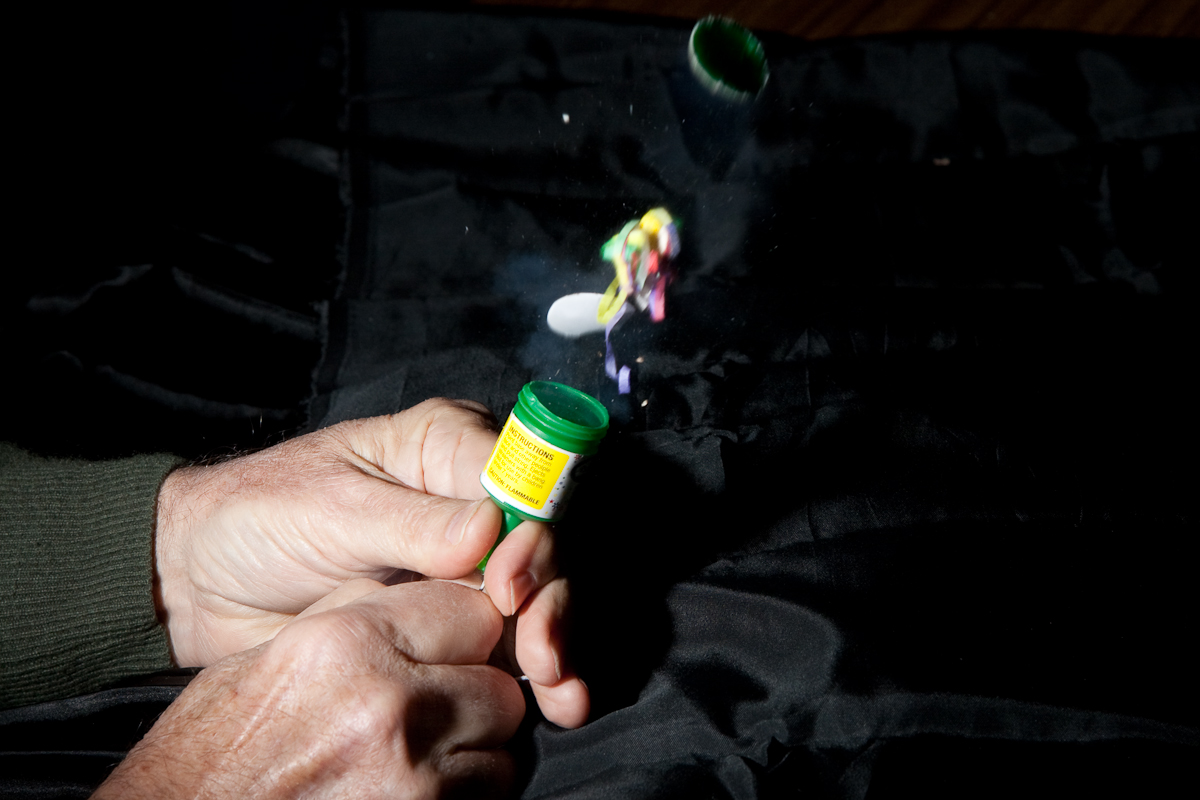
Contents being launched from the popper

Party poppers have been known to cause serious eye trauma and other facial injuries when aimed at people. Consumers are advised to avoid disassembling party poppers. Supervision of children during usage is also highly important. Party poppers are classified as "indoor fireworks", and as such, they are subject to legal restrictions in some places. Party poppers cannot be sold to anybody under the age of 16 in the United Kingdom.

== Emoji ==
The party popper has been part of emojis (🎉) since 2015. It is also known as the "tada" emoji.
