= Tail Concerto =

1998 video game

- North American cover art
- Developer: CyberConnect
- Publisher: Bandai: NA: Atlus
- Artist: Nobuteru Yūki
- Composers: Chikayo Fukuda; Seizo Nakata
- Platform: PlayStation
- Release: JP: April 16, 1998; FRA: December 1998; NA: November 3, 1999
- Genres: Action-adventure, platform
- Mode: Single-player

Tail Concerto (Note: Japanese: テイルコンチェルト, Hepburn: Teiru Koncheruto) is an action-adventure platform video game developed by CyberConnect and published by Bandai for the PlayStation. It is the first game to be developed by CyberConnect, as well as the first installment in the Little Tail Bronx series, which takes place in a steampunk fantasy world of floating islands populated by anthropomorphic dogs and cats. The game revolves around a teenaged canine police officer named Waffle Ryebread and his encounters with the Black Cats Gang, a group of sky pirates who aim to steal magic crystals. Though it received a generally positive response from critics, the title was met with low sales in Japan, falling short of the publisher's expectations.

Tail Concerto was first released in Japan in April 1998 and the following December in France, with an English version released in North America in November 1999 by publisher Atlus USA. The game features character designs and artwork by manga artist Nobuteru Yūki, and the Japanese version included the opening theme song "For Little Tail" performed by Kokia before her debut in the music business.

== Gameplay ==
Screenshot of Tail Concerto showing 3D characters and environments

Tail Concerto is an action-adventure platforming game featuring three-dimensional characters and environments. Players control the character Waffle, who pilots a semi-humanoid mecha called the "Police Robo" with the ability to run, jump, climb on ledges, and hover in mid-air for brief periods. In addition, the mecha is equipped with a pair of mechanized arms that can pick up and throw objects such as crates and bombs, as well as a long-range "bubble blaster" used to damage or immobilize enemies. The game features support for the PlayStation's DualShock controller's analog sticks, which can be used for movement instead of the directional pad, as well as its built-in vibration feedback function.

The game features a variety of levels, each with their own objectives that usually involve capturing enemy kittens by grabbing them with the Police Robo's limbs, as well as boss battles that take place at the end of certain stages. Some areas require the use of different means of travel, such as mine carts and a jet pack, or attacking enemies using heat-seeking missiles. While the game's camera remains static most of the time, the player is given the ability to rotate the view angle during certain action scenes.

The game also contains role-playing game features such as the ability to explore towns and interact with non-player characters. Also hidden in each area are whistles that grant extra lives, and boxes containing pieces of photographs featuring artwork that may be viewed in a gallery once all the sections are found. Players may choose between one of three difficulty settings from the main options screen, and progress can be saved to a PlayStation memory card.

== Plot and setting ==
Tail Concerto is set in the Kingdom of Prairie, a floating archipelago populated by anthropomorphic dogs and cats. Animosity between the two species has led to a history of conflict, with dogs now representing the majority population. Due to its unique geographical configuration, the nation's inhabitants mostly commute by way of airships, and their society is characterized by steam-based technology and mysterious crystals culled from the ruins of an ancient civilization.

The story revolves around a young canine police officer named Waffle, and begins as he investigates a public disturbance caused by the Black Cats Gang on one of Prairie's islands. He and the Black Cat's leader, Alicia, immediately recognize each other as childhood friends before she feigns ignorance and escapes.

Waffle soon encounters the cats again after they kidnap the adventurous Princess Terria, and learn that they are seeking five special crystals that hold an unknown, potentially dangerous power. After speaking with his grandfather Russel, Waffle learns that the crystals once served as the power source for a colossal robot called the Iron Giant which nearly destroyed the world centuries ago in a great war. Thinking the cats want to revive the giant themselves, he discovers that the gang is unaware of the crystals' purpose, and were only gathering them on behalf of their financier and weapon supplier Fool, who tricked them with the promise of getting revenge on the dog people for years of prejudice.

Fool successfully awakens the giant using the four gathered crystals and Alicia's pendant, a present from Waffle when they were both young, which is revealed to be the fifth. However, the robot turns on him immediately, and Alicia flies her hot air balloon inside the creature to get her pendant back. Waffle goes to rescue her, assisted by both the Black Cats and the princess's royal guard, Cyan, and manages to destroy the Giant's core while he and Alicia make their escape. In the end, Waffle takes Alicia back to his home to recover, and gives her back her pendant to reaffirm their friendship.

== Voice cast ==
- Waffle Ryebread (Note: ワッフル・ライブレッド, Waffuru Raibureddo): Akio Suyama (JP) / Lani Minella (EN)
- Panta (Note: パンタくん, Panta-kun): Tarako (JP) / Lani Minella (EN)
- Alicia Pris (Note: アリシア・プリス, Arishia Purisu): Yūko Miyamura (JP) / Amanda Winn-Lee (EN)
- Stare Pris (Note: ステア・プリス, Sutea Purisu): Chieko Higuchi (JP) / Carrie Gordon Lowrey (EN)
- Flare Pris (Note: フレア・プリス, Furea Purisu): Kumiko Nishihara (JP) / Carrie Gordon Lowrey (EN)
- Russell Ryebread (Note: ラッセル・ライブレッド, Rasseru Raibureddo): Yōsuke Akimoto (JP) / Travis (EN)
- Fool (Note: フール, Fūru): Ryūsei Nakao (JP) / Ari Ross (EN)
- Princess Terria (Note: テリア姫, Teria-hime): Maaya Sakamoto (JP) / Carrie Gordon Lowrey (EN)
- Cyan Garland (Note: シアン・ガーラント, Shian Gārando): Ryōtarō Okiayu (JP) / Jeff Hobbs (EN)
- Chamberlain: Motomu Kiyokawa (JP) / Ari Ross (EN)
- King Hound III (Note: ハウンド三世, Haundo-sansei) Yōsuke Akimoto (JP) / Jeff Hobbs (EN)
- Chief: Motomu Kiyokawa (JP) / Travis (EN)

== Development ==
Development for Tail Concerto began in 1996 by members of CyberConnect, shortly after the company was established. After the success of such 3D action titles as Nintendo's Super Mario 64 and Ocarina of Time for the Nintendo 64 and Sega's Nights into Dreams for the Sega Saturn, the company made a proposal to publisher Bandai to produce a similar game for the PlayStation, which they "gladly accepted". The game features artwork and character designs by manga artist and illustrator Nobuteru Yūki, as well as nearly 20 minutes of animated cutscenes produced by Astrovision, Inc. Tail Concerto spent nearly two years in development before being released in Japan in April 1998, and would make an appearance at the 1998 Tokyo Game Show where it "drew a crowd for its looks and playability", according to website IGN.

A playable demo featuring Japanese text and audio was later released in North America in the "Imports" section of the PlayStation Underground: Jampack disc in 1998. While Bandai of America had originally not confirmed an English release in the region, the company remarked that the title "had a very good chance" of coming to the West as early as June 1999. However, they expressed concern that the developers responsible for translating and localizing the title may not be able to complete the game on time, citing it as "the only factor that would make Tail Concerto not see a release on these shores". As the deadline passed, publishing rights changed hands between multiple US studios, including Activision, before Atlus USA announced in July 1999 that they would be releasing the North American version of Tail Concerto as part of their company strategy to "broaden its domestic library through eclectic acquisitions", and to release it by the end of the following September. Although delays caused the title to miss this date, Atlus later made a statement on their website that they would begin shipping the game to retailers on November 3, and for players to expect it in stores shortly thereafter.

=== Audio ===
Tail Concerto's background music was composed by Chikayo Fukuda and Seizo Nakata, and features the Japanese opening theme song "For Little Tail" by J-Pop singer Kokia, which was replaced by an original instrumental piece in the English version, but retained in the French version. "For Little Tail" was recorded in 1997 specifically for the game, one year before Kokia's musical debut, and was regarded by her as an "illusion song" since it was never released on any album until 13 years later, when it appeared as the B-side of her 2010 single "Road to Glory ~Long Journey~". Although no soundtrack originally accompanied the game's 1998 release, an album called the Tail Concerto Perfect Sound Track was eventually released on January 30, 2015 featuring 47 tracks, including a new version of "For Little Tail" performed by Tomoyo Mitani, who provided the vocals for the theme songs to Solatorobo: Red the Hunter and Little Tail Story.

== Reception ==
Reception

Aggregate score
Aggregator	Score
GameRankings	73%

Review scores
Publication	Score
CNET Gamecenter	6 / 10
Electronic Gaming Monthly	6 / 10
Famitsu	30 / 40
Game Informer	7.75 / 10
GameFan	88% (Note: In GameFan's viewpoint of the game, one critic gave it 84, and the rest gave it each a score of 90.)
GameSpot	6.9 / 10
IGN	7.2 / 10
Next Generation	3/5
Official U.S. PlayStation Magazine	3.5/5
RPGFan	80%
Dengeki PlayStation	75/100, 85/100, 75/100, 75/100

Tail Concerto received a 30 out of 40 from the staff of Famitsu, earning the publication's Silver Award, as well as a 77.5% average score from Dengeki PlayStation, based on individual reviews of 75, 85, 75, and 75.

The game received above-average reviews in the west according to the review aggregation website GameRankings. Peter Bartholow of GameSpot called attention to the Japanese import's "pleasant and light" presentation, deeming it "a 3D platformer perfect for gamers of all ages", but ultimately felt that it lacked challenge and was too short. Matt Helgeson of Game Informer similarly called the game charming and a "cute-fest" with "delightfully clumsy anime cutscenes", but that the gameplay was "nothing too complex or innovative." Adam Cleveland of IGN found Tail Concerto to be "a fun game that is just too short for its own good", calling attention to the game's "great graphics and sound effects", but added that it had little to offer older players who "will most likely require a little more complexity than this". He also felt that although the spoken dialogue was "very well done", the translation became "curiously awkward" as the story progressed, and that certain voice samples had a tendency to play over the wrong text. GamePro's early review called it "a strange, appealing and above-all harmless game that manages to be fun despite its obscure story and oft-frustrating control." (Note: GamePro gave the game two 4/5 scores for graphics and control, and two 4.5/5 scores for sound and fun factor.) Jeff Lundrigan of NextGen advised the reader in his review to pick up the game "on the cheap, if possible, then gather some friends, get in the right frame of mind, and surprise them by throwing this in. You'll be a hit until at least the party is over, guaranteed."

Jeremy Parish of 1Up.com compared the game to the films of director Hayao Miyazaki in 2012, declaring that "CyberConnect2's Tail Concerto and its sequel Solatorobo -- drip with Ghibli style, perhaps more than any other game you can name". He would elaborate that the series "comes across as a combination of Laputa and Porco Rosso. With a serious-mindedness that belies its whimsical appearance, these games brilliantly embody the essence of Hayao Miyazaki's directorial ethos."

The game sold approximately 97,000 units in Japan, falling short of CyberConnect and Bandai's original goal, and would reach a grand total of around 150,000 units sold worldwide.

== Legacy ==
Despite the low sales of the original game, CyberConnect were interested in creating a sequel as early as one year after Tail Concerto's release in Japan. Company president Hiroshi Matsuyama proposed ideas for Tail Concerto 2 to Bandai in both 1999 and 2000, but was rejected both times since the publisher believed the franchise simply wasn't profitable, leading CyberConnect to instead focus on their then-upcoming .hack franchise. However, Matsuyama and his colleagues didn't give up, citing that Tail Concerto had fans all over the world and believed a follow-up could still find an audience. They re-proposed the idea in 2003 and 2004, with Bandai again refusing to greenlight the project due to its predecessor's low sales.

Despite a direct sequel never coming to fruition, CyberConnect and character designer Nobuteru Yūki returned to the world of Tail Concerto in 2005 with the creation of the character "Mamoru-kun" (まもるくん), a public safety mascot who first appeared in Fukuoka Prefecture's disaster-warning email program of the same name. The promotional materials for the program reveal that Mamoru-kun and his friends live in the country of "Nipon", which, along with Tail Concerto's Prairie Kingdom, is part of a larger world called "Little Tail Bronx". In June 2007, CyberConnect2 released promotional artwork for a new video game, which was confirmed to be a spiritual successor to Tail Concerto called Solatorobo: Red the Hunter, which takes place in the same world, and was released for the Nintendo DS in 2010.

A mobile game set in the same universe, Little Tail Story, was released in 2014. Another game in the series titled Fuga: Melodies of Steel was announced as part of the Trilogy of Vengeance series, commemorating CyberConnect2's 20th anniversary. It was released in 2021 for Nintendo Switch, PlayStation 4, PlayStation 5, Xbox One, Xbox Series X/S and PC via Steam.

== See also ==
- Cartoon animal
- Mecha
