= Fuga: Melodies of Steel =

2021 video game

- Developer: CyberConnect2
- Publisher: CyberConnect2
- Director: Yoann Gueritot
- Producers: Taichiro Miyazaki; Yuki Nishikawa; Hironori Yamaoka
- Designers: Simon Abitan; Meri Honda
- Programmers: Yasuhiko Tsuneoka; Kosuke Usami; Naoki Hashimoto; You Oyadomari; Takafumi Murauchi; Ryuichi Sakata; Tan Soon Seang; Shinji Soyano
- Artist: Tokitsu Yusuke
- Writer: Yasuhiro Noguchi
- Composer: Chikayo Fukuda
- Series: Little Tail Bronx
- Engine: Unreal Engine 4
- Platforms: Microsoft Windows; Nintendo Switch; PlayStation 4; PlayStation 5; Xbox One; Xbox Series X/S; iOS; Android
- Release: Windows, Nintendo Switch, PlayStation 4, PS5, Xbox One, Xbox Series X/S; July 29, 2021; iOS, Android; July 29, 2026
- Genre: Tactical role-playing
- Mode: Single-player

Fuga: Melodies of Steel (Note: Known in Japan as 戦場のフーガ (Senjō no Fūga, "Fugue of the Battlefield")) is a tactical role-playing video game developed and published by CyberConnect2. It is the fourth title in the company's Little Tail Bronx series, and serves as a prequel to Tail Concerto and Solatorobo: Red the Hunter. The game takes place in a war-torn world populated by anthropomorphic dogs and cats ("Caninu" and "Felineko" respectively, lit. "イヌヒト" and "ネコヒト" / "dog people" and "cat people"), where a group of children struggle for survival aboard a giant tank against soldiers from an enemy nation. It was released in July 2021 for Microsoft Windows, Nintendo Switch, PlayStation 4, PlayStation 5, Xbox One and Xbox Series X/S. Mobile ports for iOS and Android was released on the game's fifth-year anniversary on July 29, 2026, with all of the DLC intact.

A sequel, Fuga: Melodies of Steel 2, was released in May 2023.

== Premise ==
Fuga is set in a war-ravaged world where a village is destroyed by the Berman Empire. Six child survivors band together, and 6 can be rescued throughout the game, one being from the Berman empire themselves. After the attack, they board a gigantic tank known as Taranis—a relic of an ancient but technologically advanced civilization—in order to travel across the dangerous landscape and rescue their families who were taken prisoner. The Taranis houses a super weapon called the Soul Cannon which is capable of immense destruction at the cost of a crew member's life, with the main characters having to choose when and whom to sacrifice in order for the group to reach their destination. The game is separated into 12 chapters and features multiple endings depending on player choice and how many characters survive.

== Development ==
In February 2018, CyberConnect2 announced a recruitment drive for its "Next Plan" project which would shift its design focus for the next decade to new, original titles. The first of these, Fuga: Melodies of Steel, was showcased at Anime Expo 2019 by the developer as part of its Little Tail Bronx series, and would be its first self-published game. It is the first strategy role-playing game in the franchise, and is designed to be similar to roguelike games where the story is advanced through trial and error. The setting was based on France during World War II and was given a tone where the main characters "will experience the horrors and cruelty of war" but will "depict the bright and joyful atmosphere that the Little Tail Bronx series is known for". The title is meant to be the first of three games from the company known as the "Trilogy of Vengeance" along with Tokyo Ogre Gate and Cecile - games built by smaller teams and development cycles connected by a common theme of vengeance. CyberConnect2 jump-started the project by establishing an in-house game design competition known as the "C5 Project Initiative" where ideas were gathered by various staff. Fuga was originally meant to be released along with the rest of "Vengeance" games by the end of 2019, but was pushed back until early 2020, then again to 2021. The game was released for the PlayStation 5 and Xbox Series X/S, in addition to the previously announced Microsoft Windows, Nintendo Switch, PlayStation 4 and Xbox One platforms, on July 29, 2021. The game had a development budget in excess of ¥327 million. In February 2022, creative director Yoann Gueritot announced that Fuga would become a trilogy.

== Reception ==
Reception

Aggregate score
| Aggregator | Score |
|---|---|
| Metacritic | PC: 84/100; NS: 82/100; XSX: 89/100 |

Review scores
| Publication | Score |
|---|---|
| Famitsu | 33/40 |
| Nintendo World Report | 7/10 |
| RPGFan | 70/100 |

Fuga: Melodies of Steel received "generally favorable reviews" from critics according to review aggregator Metacritic.

== Legacy ==
In August 2021, CyberConnect2 announced that a manga adaptation, titled Fuga: Melodies of the Battlefield, was in the works. Written and illustrated by Takafumi Adachi, the manga launched on December 7 the same year.
