= Index of Windows games (J) =

This is an index of Microsoft Windows games.

This list has been split into multiple pages. Please use the Table of Contents to browse it.

Title	Released	Developer	Publisher
Jack Keane	2007	Deck13 Interactive	Strategy First
Jack Orlando	1997	Toontraxx	TopWare Interactive, JoWooD Productions
Jack the Ripper	2004	Galilea Games	The Adventure Company
Jade Empire	2007	BioWare, LTI Gray Matter	2K Games, Electronic Arts
Jagged Alliance 2	1999	Sir-Tech Canada	TalonSoft
Jagged Alliance: Back in Action	2012	Coreplay	bitComposer, Kalypso Media
Jagged Alliance: Flashback	2014	Full Control	Full Control
Jagged Alliance: Rage!	2018	Cliffhanger Productions	HandyGames
James Bond 007: Nightfire	2002	Eurocom, Gearbox Software, Aspyr, JV Games	Electronic Arts, MGM Interactive
Jane's Attack Squadron	2002	Looking Glass Studios	Xicat Interactive, Inc.
Jane's F-15	1998	Jane's Combat Simulations	Electronic Arts
Jane's IAF: Israeli Air Force	1998	Pixel Multimedia	Electronic Arts
Jane's US Navy Fighters 97	1996	Electronic Arts	Electronic Arts
Jane's USAF	1999	Electronic Arts	Electronic Arts
Jane's WWII Fighters	1998	Jane's Combat Simulations	Electronic Arts
Jaws Unleashed	2006	Appaloosa Interactive	Majesco
Jazz Jackrabbit 2	1998	Orange Games, Epic Games	Gathering of Developers
Jeff Wayne's The War of the Worlds	1998	Pixelogic ltd.	GT Interactive
Jerusalem: The Three Roads to the Holy Land	2002	Arxel Tribe	Cryo Interactive
Jets'n'Guns	2004	RakeInGrass	RakeInGrass, Reflexive Entertainment, Stardock
Jett: The Far Shore	2021	Superbrothers, Pine Scented Software	Superbrothers, Pine Scented Software
Jewel Quest	2004	iWin	iWin
JFK Reloaded	2004	Traffic Games	Traffic Games
Jimmy Neutron vs. Jimmy Negatron	2002	AWE Games	THQ
Jimmy Neutron: Boy Genius	2001	AWE Games, Big Sky Interactive, Human Soft	THQ
Jimmy White's 2: Cueball	1999	Awesome Developments	Virgin Interactive
Jingai Makyō	2005	Nitroplus	Nitroplus
John Deere: American Farmer	2004	Gabriel Entertainment	Destineer
Joint Operations: Typhoon Rising	2004	NovaLogic	NovaLogic
Joint Strike Fighter	1997	Innerloop	Eidos Interactive
Joint Task Force	2006	Most Wanted Entertainment	HD Publishing, Sierra Entertainment
Jonny Quest: Cover-Up at Roswell	1996	Virgin Sound and Vision	Virgin Sound and Vision
Journey	2019	Thatgamecompany, Inline Assembly Ltd.	Annapurna Interactive
Journey to the Savage Planet	2020	Typhoon Studios	505 Games
The Journeyman Project 2: Buried in Time	1995	Presto Studios	Sanctuary Woods
The Journeyman Project 3: Legacy of Time	1998	Presto Studios	Red Orb Entertainment
Judge Dredd: Dredd vs. Death	2003	Rebellion Developments	Evolved Games
Juiced	2005	Juice Games	THQ
Jump 'n Bump	1998	Brainchild Design	Brainchild Design
JumpStart 2nd Grade	1996	Knowledge Adventure	Knowledge Adventure
JumpStart Advanced 2nd Grade	2002	Knowledge Adventure	Knowledge Adventure
JumpStart Adventures 3rd Grade: Mystery Mountain	1996	Knowledge Adventure	Knowledge Adventure
JumpStart Adventures 4th Grade: Haunted Island	1996	Knowledge Adventure	Knowledge Adventure
JumpStart Adventures 4th Grade: Sapphire Falls	2000	Knowledge Adventure	Knowledge Adventure
JumpStart Adventures 5th Grade: Jo Hammet, Kid Detective	1997	Knowledge Adventure	Knowledge Adventure
JumpStart SpyMasters: Unmask the Prankster	2001	Knowledge Adventure	Knowledge Adventure
JumpStart Typing	1997	Knowledge Adventure	Knowledge Adventure
Jurassic Park III: Danger Zone!	2001	Knowledge Adventure	Knowledge Adventure
Jurassic Park III: Dino Defender	2001	Knowledge Adventure	Knowledge Adventure
Jurassic Park: Operation Genesis	2003	Blue Tongue Entertainment	Vivendi Universal
Just Cause	2006	Avalanche Studios	Eidos Interactive
Just Cause 2	2010	Avalanche Studios	Eidos Interactive
