= Tony Pope =

American voice actor (1947–2004)

- Born: Anthony J. Pope; March 22, 1947; Cleveland, Ohio, U.S.
- Died: February 11, 2004 (aged 56); Burbank, California, U.S.
- Resting place: Forest Lawn Memorial Park (Hollywood Hills)
- Other names: Anthony Mozdy; Anthony Mozoy
- Occupation: Voice actor
- Years active: 1973–2004
- Spouse: Patricia Lentz (m. 1984)
- Children: 3

Anthony J. Pope (March 22, 1947 – February 11, 2004) was an American voice actor. He appeared in over 100 titles during his three-decade career, including as the voice of Goofy from 1979 to 1988. His anime roles include Colonel Shikishima in the Streamline Pictures dub of Akira (1988) and Shunsaku Ban in Metropolis (2001). Pope also provided the voice for the Tiger Electronics toy Furby.

== Early life ==
Anthony J. Pope was born in Cleveland, Ohio, on March 22, 1947, to Thomas and Katherine Pope (née Mozdy).

== Career ==
After graduating from college, Pope moved to Los Angeles, California in 1973 where he officially began his career as a voice actor. His mentor was Daws Butler who was best known as the voice of Yogi Bear and Huckleberry Hound. Pope was known for providing the voice of Furby in English and five other languages. He was also the voice of Goofy for 11 years, garnering 17 Gold and Platinum records. His voice is prominent at Disneyland on several rides, as well as in the JumpStart products by Knowledge Adventure.

== Personal life ==
Pope married actress Patricia Lentz in 1984 and had three children together.

== Death ==
Pope died on February 11, 2004, from complications of leg surgery at the age of 56 in Burbank, California. He was buried at Forest Lawn – Hollywood Hills Cemetery.

== Filmography ==
=== Film ===
Year	Title	Role	Notes
1980	Hurray for Betty Boop	Coffee Shop Boss, Mirror, Ringmaster	
1985	Back to the Future	Radio Announcer	Uncredited
1987	Sport Goofy in Soccermania	Goofy	
1988	Invasion Earth: The Aliens Are Here	Alien	
1988	Who Framed Roger Rabbit	Goofy, Big Bad Wolf	Role of Goofy shared with Bill Farmer
1988	Akira	Colonel Shikishima, Yamagata, Nezu	Credited as Anthony Mozdy
1990	Spaced Invaders	Lieutenant Giggywig	
1990	Watchers II	Outsider	
1997	Cats Don't Dance	Alligator	
1999	The King and I	Burmese Emissary	
2001	Metropolis	Shunsaku Ban	
2001	Marco Polo: Return to Xanadu	Babu, Foo-Long, Reginald	
2002	Muhammad: The Last Prophet	Salman	
2003	LeapFrog: The Letter Factory	Professor Quigley	
2003	LeapFrog: Talking Words Factory	Professor Quigley	
2004	The Nutcracker and the Mouse King	Father, Old General	Posthumously release; Final role

=== Anime ===
Year	Title	Role	Notes
1981	Mobile Suit Gundam	General Revil	
1981	Mobile Suit Gundam: Soldiers of Sorrow	General Revil	
1982	Mobile Suit Gundam III: Encounters in Space	General Revil	
1987	Royal Space Force: The Wings of Honnêamise	Majaho	
1991	Mobile Suit Gundam F91	Leslie Arno	
1992	Ramayana: The Legend of Prince Rama	Sage Vishvamitra	
1996	Apocalypse Zero	Oboro Hagakure	
1996	Fake	Chief, Jaco	
1996–1999	Rurouni Kenshin	Kaishu Katsu	
1998	Vampire Princess Miyu	Tonbi	
1998–2003	The Adventures of Mini-Goddess	Gan-chan	
1999	The Big O	Gisang	
1999	Hello Kitty's Paradise	Papa	
2001	Samurai Girl: Real Bout High School	Tessai Onizuka	
2001	S-CRY-ed	Chief	
2002	Cyborg 009	Commander, Dr. Herschel	
2002	Digimon Tamers	Zhuqiaomon	
2002	Ai Yori Aoshi	Kaoru's Grandfather, Fish Vendor	
2002	Ground Defense Force! Mao-chan	Sorajirou Tsukishima	Credited as Anthony Mozdy
2002	Heat Guy J	Mauro	Later replaced by Steve Kramer

=== Animation ===
Year	Title	Role	Notes
1981	Spider-Man	Joshua	Episode: "The Incredible Shrinking Spider-Man"
1986–1987	The Transformers	Wreck-Gar, additional voices	7 episodes
1992	Tiny Toon Adventures	God	Episode: "It's a Wonderful Tiny Toons Christmas Special"
1993	SWAT Kats: The Radical Squadron	Sergeant	Episode: "Rise of the Dark Kat"
1994–1995	Creepy Crawlers	Professor Googengrime, Tom Lockjaw, Hocus Locus	24 episodes
1995	What a Cartoon!	Junior	2 episodes
1997	I Am Weasel	Jacques Cousteau, Boy	Episode: "Deep Sea Tour"
1998	Pinky and the Brain	Waiter	Episode: "Beach Blanket Brain"
1998	Superman: The Animated Series	Scientist	Episode: "New Kids in Town"
2001–2003	House of Mouse	Geppetto	2 episodes

=== Video games ===
Year	Title	Role	Notes
1993	Sam & Max Hit the Road	Various characters	
1993	Star Wars: Rebel Assault	C-3PO, Gamma Base Communications Officer	
1994	JumpStart Kindergarten	Mr. Hopsalot	
1994	Ace Ventura: The Case of the Serial Shaver	Shickadance, Doctor	
1995	JumpStart 1st Grade	Frankie	
1996	JumpStart Adventures 3rd Grade: Mystery Mountain	Professor Sparks	
1996	JumpStart Adventures 4th Grade: Haunted Island	Flap	
1996	JumpStart 2nd Grade	Edison	
1997	JumpStart 1st Grade Math	Frankie, Bookworm	
1998	JumpStart Kindergarten Reading	Mr. Hopsalot	
1998	JumpStart Math	Edison	
1998	Star Wars Trilogy Arcade	C-3PO, Rebel	
1998	Star Wars: Rebellion	C-3PO, Yoda, Death Star Commander	
1999	Disney's Villains' Revenge	Out	
2000	Diablo II	Elzix, Guard	
2000	JumpStart 1st Grade Reading	Frankie	
2002	Kingdom Hearts	Geppetto	
2002	Monopoly Party	Mr. Monopoly	

=== Other ===
- Disney Discovery Series (1984–1987, read-along recordings) – Goofy, Ludwig Von Drake
- Teddy Ruxpin (1986, read-along recordings) – Newton Gimmick, L.B. the Bounder
- Robbery on the Overland Express: A Whoodunit Mickey Mystery (1993, Disney's Storyteller Series) – Heinrich Schniffengraul
- The Lion King: The Brightest Star (1994) – Cheetah (read-along cassette story recording)
- The Emperor's New Groove (2000, Disney's Storyteller Series) – Narrator
- Furby (1998) – Voice of the Furby toy
