= JumpStart Advanced 1st Grade =

2002 educational video game

- Developer: Knowledge Adventure
- Publisher: Knowledge Adventure
- Series: JumpStart
- Platforms: Windows, Macintosh
- Release: 2002
- Genre: Educational
- Modes: Single-player, multiplayer

JumpStart Advanced 1st Grade is a personal computer game created by Knowledge Adventure. It replaced the previous JumpStart 1st Grade released in 1995 and updated in 2000. As its name suggests, it was made to teach first grade students. From 2003–2008, it was distributed as the "Fundamentals" disc in a 3- or 4-disc package of the same name, though recently a factory error caused many JumpStart Advanced 1st Grade packages to instead contain JumpStart 3D Virtual World: Trouble in Town going by the same name.

== Overview ==
The game focuses on a racing tournament run on scooters that takes place in JumpStartville, the hometown of all the characters in this version of the canon. Jimmy Bumples, a typical school bully, pushes a young dog named Squirt, causing him to fall off and break his scooter just before the tournament starts. Since the prize for winning the race is a new, "totally tricked out" Super Scooter, the other protagonistic characters decide they must win the tournament so they can give the new scooter to Squirt. Jimmy is very good at scooter races, however, so in order to win, the characters must upgrade their scooters with gadgets.

The basic goal of the game is to win the JumpStartville scooter tournament; specifically, the user must win two races on each track while playing the track's owner. The first race is a race against two other also-playable characters controlled by CPUs, while the second race is against one of these characters and Jimmy as well. By playing educational activities, the user earns "power-ups" that can be transformed into gadgets and track obstacles via machines created by Hopsalot. Placing all of the available obstacles on a track will unlock it. The obstacles, however, are difficult to get past unless gadgets are added to scooters, and end up slowing the user down if a gadget is not used. Ideally, all of the gadgets should be added to every character's scooter. After all of the main characters' tracks are completed, Jimmy's track is unlocked, and the game is completed when it is won.

As in other JumpStart games, the difficulty level of the problems in JumpStart Advanced 1st Grade can be set to three different levels. In addition, the gameplay level can also be set for some games. Higher gameplay levels generally mean more enemies and faster speed.

== Characters ==
All of the characters are anthropomorphic animals.

=== Playable characters ===
The following characters are playable in the scooter races, have their own activity in this game and give out a powerup when it is completed, and have their own track. On an irrelevant note, they are all characters on the All-Stars walkie-talkie feature.

Frankie (voiced by Dee Bradley Baker): A moderately light brown dachshund dog who first appeared in the 1995 version of JumpStart 1st Grade. This version of Frankie featured in the JumpStart Advanced series usually wears a red sweatshirt with yellow lining and a blue dog collar, and is basically the mascot and main character of the game. He is good-natured and protective of the right thing, and he stood up to Jimmy and told him to fix Squirt's scooter (a request that was obviously refused). He is also very friendly and sociable. He loves dog biscuits and pizzas, and apparently has a home pizza parlor. His powerup is the Power Bone (sometimes referred to as the Smokey Bone). His name is likely a nod to "frankfurter", the kind of sausage that is traditionally used in hot dogs.

Hopsalot (voiced by Brianne Siddall): A light brown rabbit who first appeared in the 1994 version of JumpStart Kindergarten. Though he was originally depicted as an adult with the title of "Mr.", he is a child in this game, as in other games of the JumpStart Advanced series. He is also naturally bright and is talented and making new inventions. Since he is a good builder, it is unusual that he did not offer to fix Squirt's scooter. He wears a teal shirt, and was described as "quirky and original" by Frankie. He is often referred to by his nickname, "Hops". His powerup is the Hyper Carrot Fuel.

Casey (voiced by Brianne Siddall): A yellow-orange cat who first appeared in the 1995 version of JumpStart Preschool. He has a tuft of orange hair on his head, a tail tip and belly who are a lighter color than the rest of his body, a blue baseball cap turned so the brim is on the back, and a green T-shirt. He has much energy and loves sports, and his powerup is the Game-Winning Soccer Ball.

Eleanor (voiced by Kath Soucie): A pink elephant wearing a purple dress, bow, and shoes, Eleanor first appeared in Preschool. She loves reading books and eating peanuts, and her powerup is the Power Peanut. In this game, she owns a news channel she calls JumpStart Real News Network. She may be named after Eleanor Roosevelt, the first lady of Franklin D. Roosevelt, the 32nd President of the United States.

Pierre (voiced by Joshua Seth): A polar bear wearing a multi-colored hat, an orange shirt, blue overalls, and sneakers. He loves music and, apparently, snow, and owns a drum. His powerup is the Magic Ice Crystal. He is probably named after Pierre, South Dakota.

Kisha (voiced by Hope Levy): A koala who wears purple sandals and a painting shirt with a blue paint stain and a green paint stain. She loves creating art of different forms, and, judging by her shirt and powerup, she seems partial to painting. Her powerup is the Magic Paint Tube and takes a bubble bath.

C.J. (voiced by Joshua Seth): A green frog who first appeared in JumpStart 2nd Grade, C.J. wears a light-tan hat with a brown band, a tan shirt and pants, and a brown vest, and he is more humanoid than his original design. He is depicted as an explorer, adventurer, and naturalist, and his closest friend is Edison. His powerup is Swamp Gas.

=== Non-playable characters ===
These are other characters, and they cannot be played in the scooter races.

Edison (voiced by Dee Bradley Baker): Though he is a firefly, he bears little resemblance to the actual creature, and he first appeared in JumpStart 2nd Grade. His Advanced incarnation is teal with a red nose, as well as wings and the traditional firefly light on his rear, and he wears a purple hat and a blue shirt. He shares a close and ironic friendship with C.J., has an Irish-sounding accent, owns a store, appears at the winner's circle after every race to give a comment (obviously he is enthusiastic when C.J. wins), and has his own game and powerup (the Lightbulb Powerup), yet does not have his own scooter or track. He is possibly named after Thomas Edison, the inventor of the light bulb.

Squirt (voiced by Brianne Siddall): A cream-colored puppy with large ears and a red T-shirt. He seems to be significantly younger than the other characters, and bears some resemblance to Frankie. He helps Frankie in his home pizza parlor by telling him orders and delivering pizzas. During the beginning of the game, Jimmy pushes him and breaks his scooter, and the entire game is spent trying to win the Super Scooter for Squirt. According to a website belonging to Tracy Reynolds, an artist who worked on JumpStart Advanced 1st Grade, Squirt is Frankie's cousin.

Jimmy Bumples (voiced by Joshua Seth): A slender, grey-and-brown weasel wearing a black shirt and the only character whose last name is stated. He is a sly bully and excellent at scooter racing. He is responsible for breaking Squirt's scooter, and refuses to repair it. He sometimes appears as an enemy in Casey's soccer game, and will challenge the player every time they win a race. He is the only character who appears on the scooter races and is not playable. He has his own track, and it must be unlocked by winning all the other tracks while playing their owners. When his track is won, the entire game is as well. Early character designs suggest Jimmy was going to be a dog at one point, but this was changed before the product's release. He is the main antagonist.

Skid: A gray rat and Jimmy's apparent sidekick, he follows Jimmy around in the beginning cutscene and appears as an enemy in Casey's game, but he does not appear anywhere else. He has no dialogue besides a single snicker.

Casey's friends & teammates: In Casey's activity, many cats, apparently teammates and opponents of Casey in soccer, appear. All of them resemble Casey exactly, save for the color, and none have any dialogue.

== Locations and games ==
The game takes place in JumpStartville, a small city occupied by anthropomorphic animals. Within JumpStartville, there are several places the user may visit, most of which contain a game that is played to earn the player a powerup.

=== Frankie's Home ===
Frankie lives in an amber house with a red door and a pointed roof covered in cardinal tiles. The roof has what looks like a decorative golden bone on top.

==== Activity ====
The activity is presumably played in Frankie's backyard and teaches fractions. In it, the player must make pizzas for customers of Frankie's home pizza parlor using a contraption that is composed of a conveyor belt and an oven. First, Squirt arrives and tells Frankie what the customers ordered. The customers consistently order a pizza that has a certain topping on each fraction of the crust. Next, Frankie tosses a wad of dough into the air, and it forms a pizza shape. On early levels, the pizza dough is automatically marked with the fractional sections necessary to complete the pizza; on later levels, the users must mark the dough themselves with virtual pizza sauce. The pizza then is dragged onto the conveyor belt and the user must add pizza toppings to the different sections to complete the customer's order. The user must work quickly, as the second a topping is put on the pizza, the conveyor belt starts moving the pizza towards the oven. If the pizza is what the customer ordered when it makes it to the oven, Squirt will take the pizza away and come back with another order. If it is incorrect, Frankie will eat the pizza whole, claiming that he cannot let a pizza go to waste. Once four pizzas are made successfully, a Power Bone is earned.

=== Casey's Home ===
Casey's house is mostly white with a red door, a yellow roof and a huge baseball cap just above the door that forms a kind of awning with its brim.

==== Activity ====
The activity takes place in Casey's backyard, which is somewhat reminiscent of a soccer field. It teaches phonics. In it, Casey is practicing soccer, and is temporarily being "coached" by Frankie. Unlike real soccer, however, this game is apparently played on scooter. At the start of the game, Frankie tells Casey to select a ball with a letter or blend that makes the sound he says. Then, Frankie tells Casey to pass the ball to one of his teammates whose scooter is marked with the second half of a word, and, combined with the letter, blend or digraph on Casey's soccer ball, it forms a word. The teammate then must pass the ball to another teammate who has a certain kind of word on their scooter (i.e. a word that rhymes with the newly created word). This teammate then must kick the soccer ball into a goal with another kind of word in it. Throughout the game, the player must avoid passing the ball to Jimmy, Skid or a player with the incorrect answer, which will cause the ball to bounce back. After being played four times, a Game-Winning Soccer Ball is won.

=== The Tree of Knowledge ===
The Tree of Knowledge is a tree covered with doors and windows, so apparently it can be walked inside of. Hopsalot's game takes place here, so the Tree of Knowledge could possibly be his home, but this is debatable.

==== Activity ====
This activity takes place just outside the Tree of Knowledge. To prevent Jimmy from stealing them for his own purposes, Hopsalot stored his Hyper Carrot Fuel in a chest on an island. To grant himself access to the carrots, he created an invention that would supply him with miniature blimps to create a bridge with. In order for the blimps to create a bridge, they must be guided into different sections that each represent a different category. Each blimp is marked with a picture or word that belongs to one of the three categories provided. Sometimes the picture is an animal, and the blimp must be guided into the class it belongs to (i.e. mammals, reptiles, and birds), meaning this activity sometimes teaches beginner zoology. It can also teach a variety of other subjects, such as identifying shapes, parts of speech, and the number of syllables in a word. If a blimp does not fit in a category, it may be guided towards Hopsalot, who will pop it with an oversized thumbtack. Once each section has three blimps, Hopslaot will hop to the island on the blimps, grab a carrot, and head back. The bridge must then be destroyed with "pop blimps" - blimps with sharp carrots attached to them. The same rules apply, however, as pop blimps must be guided to the category in which they belong.

=== C.J.'s Home ===
C.J. lives in a house (called "Frog Manor" in some other JumpStart games) that rests upon an island in a swamp. The house is white and adorned with enormous fake toadstools.

==== Activity ====
The activity takes place in C.J.'s swamp, where the Swamp Gas machine is located. Guided by the user, C.J. must put green bubbles bubbling up from the bottom of the swamp into the Swamp Gas machine to complete math equations or words. The user must also be wary of alligators, which, while mysteriously unable to cause direct harm to C.J., pop any bubbles they touch. Every time four words or equations are finished, the Swamp Gas machine will create one-fourth of a bottle of Swamp Gas, meaning that 16 equations or words must be finished to earn one bottle of Swamp Gas.

=== Eleanor's Home ===
Eleanor lives in a square-shaped pink house with a roof that seems to have been fashioned after peanuts. A satellite dish is attached to her home, apparently so she can broadcast her news program.

==== Activity ====
Unlike most of the activities, Eleanor's game actually takes place within her house. First, the user must read a short article from one of four categories: Encyclopedia, Webpage, Storybook, or News Story. Then, Eleanor will ask the user questions about the article. The user then drags tiles marked with words and punctuation to create a complete, grammatically correct sentence answering her question. This activity is meant to teach grammatical sentence structure and reading comprehension.

=== Pierre's Home ===
Pierre lives in a wooden house with a purple roof and a garage resembling a drum. Even though it seems to be summer or spring in most of JumpStartville, Pierre's house is surrounded by thick snow.

==== Activity ====
This activity takes place in the snowy area surrounding Pierre's house, where Pierre has decided to practice scooting and, evidently, make a "snow bear" (bear-shaped snowman) at the same time. The user guides Pierre to gather snowballs marked with words and pictures in a certain order; for example, sometimes ordinals must be collected in order from lowest to highest, numbers from least to greatest, or steps in a life cycle in the order they happen. A seal stands in the upper right corner blowing a horn. If Pierre is close to the seal when he blows it, he would scoot away very fast saying "Whoa!" Every time a sequence is finished, a batch of snow is created. Once four batches of snow have been formed, the snow bear is completed and a Magic Ice Crystal is earned.

=== Kisha's Home ===
Kisha's house is multicoloured, with the right side designed to look like a paint brush and a what looks like large palette of paints on the left side. Kisha actually has two games, which are played in two different rooms of her house.

==== Painting Room Activity ====
The activity in the Painting Room is a basic drawing program, with a few features such as simple stickers and paint-mixing. Drawings made in this activity come in two sizes, Card and Billboard. Cards are large and can be used to create Card Shows in the Music Room. Billboards are much smaller and will appear on the side of tracks if a Billboard or TV is bought in Edison's shop. This activity, along with the actual Scooter Tournament itself, are the only ones to not award the user a powerup upon completion.

==== Music Room Activity ====
In this activity, users create simple presentations using pictures (including the Cards made in the Painting Room Activity) and brief music clips from a wide variety of instruments. Once a Card Show is completed, a Magic Paint Tube is earned. In addition, a Card Show is always played at the Winner's Circle (by default, the last Card Show the user creates will be played at the Winner's Circle, though the user can also choose which Card Show should be played).

=== Edison's Shop ===
Edison owns a shop, which seems to be styled after a traffic cone surrounded by two cans of gasoline.

==== Activity ====
In this activity, Edison will tell the user to buy a certain track decoration and use coins from his piggy bank to pay for it (technically, this would mean Edison would not earn any money). The user may select which track to decorate with each product that is bought. Edison will then compliment the user for the choice. Once four items are bought, a Lightbulb Powerup (since the lightbulb was invented by Thomas Edison) is won. This game intends to teach the user about coins of the United States dollar and how to count them out properly.

=== Scooter Design Shop ===
Fashioned after a purple helmet, the scooter design shop contains a machine created by Hopsalot to transform powerups into gadgets, which may then be added to the JumpStart characters' scooters.

=== Track Control Tower ===
The track control tower is a tall tower which contains another machine by Hopsalot which can transform powerups into "tricks" (obstacles), which may then be added to the JumpStart characters' tracks.

=== Race Prep Arena ===
The Race Prep Arena is a large arena where the JumpStart Scooter Tournament takes place.

==== Activity ====
This activity is the only one in the game that does not seem to provide any educational value, except perhaps improving hand-eye coordination. It is, essentially, the JumpStart Scooter Tournament itself. Players first choose a racer and a track, and then they navigate their chosen racer through the track they have chosen. When they come across an obstacle, users may use a gadget as long as they have a gadget that applies (that is, the gadget that was made from the same powerup as the obstacle was). Aside from the tracks belonging to the seven playable characters, there is also a practice track which makes no progress in the game, and Jimmy's track, which is unlocked by winning first place on each track while playing the track's owner two times. There is also a multiplayer option, making this one of the few multiplayer JumpStart games. Every time a scooter race is completed, the user visits the Winner's Circle briefly, where it is stated where the characters placed.
