= JumpStart SpyMasters: Unmask the Prankster =

2001 video game

- Developer: Knowledge Adventure
- Publisher: Knowledge Adventure
- Series: JumpStart
- Platform: PC
- Release: 2001
- Genre: Educational/adventure
- Mode: Single-player

JumpStart SpyMasters: Unmask the Prankster is a personal computer game made by Knowledge Adventure where the user must stop the Prankster. As in other JumpStart games, one has to solve educational problems to complete the game.

== Gameplay ==
There are three locations in the game.

=== HQ ===
- HQ: This is where the user goes after completing a mission.
- Lab: Here the user connects molecules with words on them organized according to their lexical category.
- Spy Masters Online: This is an Internet game where one has to get the flag from the other team.

=== Adventure Valley ===
- Dell's: This is a fast food restaurant where the players have to get the right amount of mustard in 3 blenders.
- Recording Studio: Here the players must get instrument to touch the right letter to spell the requested word.
- Software Company: The players must get to the words related to the requested word above before the time runs out.
- Robot Factory: The players must sort out computer chips with a word on them to get them 4 in a row.
- Clock tower: An area similar to the Recording Studio.
- Airport: An area similar to the Software Company.
- Power Plant: An area very alike to the Lab.

=== Ancient Ruins ===
- Library: The players must find what the pictures mean and change to a word.
- Map Room: The place which is similar to the Robot Factory.

=== Abandoned Amusement Park ===
- Puzzle Fun House: An area identical to the Library.
- Octopus Ride: An area similar to the Dell's but the only difference is that the players shoot beach balls into pirate ships.

=== Other areas ===
These places can only accessible by Jet pack or during pre-mission:

- Training Area: The user can only go there during the pre- mission and is near the ocean.
- Other Areas: Some are between the airport and Dell's, on rivers or near the ruins.

== Cast ==
- Jess/Jo: Paula Tiso
- Zack: Phil Snyder
- Sally: Kim Mai Guest
- Botley/Max: Dee Bradley Baker
- TJ: Brianne Siddall
- Dr.X: Lex Lang

== Characters ==
=== Adventurers ===
- Botley: AndroidXL2 ("Botley"), of JumpStart Adventures 3rd Grade: Mystery Mountain & JumpStart Typing, is a robot. In the game, Botley speaks in an older tone of voice.
- Thomas James Adams, of JumpStart Adventures 4th Grade: Sapphire Falls, is the newest member of the Adventurers in the game and seems to be very excited. In the game, his green T-shirt turns into a tan sweater with a green vest.
- Sally Chu, also of JumpStart Adventures 4th Grade: Sapphire Falls. In the game, Sally's ponytail turns plain short.
- Jo Hammet, of JumpStart Adventures 5th Grade: Jo Hammet, Kid Detective, seems to like skateboarding and rollerblading (as seen in JumpStart 5th Grade and JumpStart Adventure Challenge - a bonus disc that was included with several games in the past and which was also released under the names Far Out Field Trips, Ultimate Field Trips, and Extreme Field Trips in several of the Advanced packages of those same games).
- Zack is from JumpStart Adventures 6th Grade: Mission Earthquest. In the game, Zack's sweater turns into a T-shirt.
- Jess is Zack's sister and is also from JumpStart Adventures 6th Grade: Mission Earthquest. In the game, Jess' hair is black instead of red.

=== Villains ===
- Max Masters/Prankster: Max used to be the youngest Adventurer until he was kicked out. In the game, he plays pranks on (or tries to get revenge against) the Adventurers as the Prankster. He is defeated, but later seeks revenge in the sequel.

=== Minor characters/unseen ===
- People: Some were seen after the Naptime mission.

==== Unseen ====
- Dr.X: From JumpStart Adventures 5th Grade: Jo Hammet, Kid Detective, he was not mentioned in the game but his name was seen in the credits.

== See also ==
- JumpStart
