= JumpStart 3D Virtual World =

- Genre: Educational games

JumpStart 3D Virtual World is a sub-series of the larger JumpStart series of educational games. It was originally titled JumpStart World. In 2018, it was followed by JumpStart Academy.

The games feature the user maneuvering a character through a 3D world, going on missions, and playing educational activities.

Unlike the other JumpStart games, each JumpStart 3D Virtual World game comes with a limited number of levels when purchased. When these levels are completed, an online subscription is required for the player to move on. This was not mentioned on early packages, causing complaints from some buyers.

The series contains 4 games:

- JumpStart 3D Virtual World: My First Adventure (originally JumpStart Advanced Premium Preschool World)
- JumpStart 3D Virtual World: The Legend of Grizzly McGuffin (originally JumpStart World Kindergarten)
- JumpStart 3D Virtual World: Trouble in Town (originally JumpStart World 1st Grade)
- JumpStart 3D Virtual World: The Quest for the Color Meister (originally JumpStart World 2nd Grade)

== Main characters ==
These are not the only characters in JumpStart 3D Virtual World, but they are the most prominent ones. All of these characters have had their current character design since the release of JumpStart Phonics Read & Rhyme, except for Botley, who did not appear in that game. In addition, Pierre and Kisha's species were changed, and Pierre is now a panda and Kisha is now a tiger. The appearance of most of these characters varies from game to game; primarily, they are usually shorter, medium-sized, and younger-looking in games for younger children and taller, resembling teenagers, in the 2nd Grade games for higher levels. The exception to this is Frankie and Botley, whose appearances are consistent. Casey the cat, on the other hand, doesn't appear in JumpStart 3D Virtual World.

Frankie: The mascot and main character of all the JumpStart 3D Virtual World games, Frankie is an anthropomorphic dachshund dog who first appeared in JumpStart 1st Grade. In this game, he is light brown, wears blue jeans, a blue dog collar, a small black belt, and a mahogany shirt with a darker stripe outlined in yellow going across the middle. He basically runs everything in the JumpStart world according to this canon, essentially making him the leader. He likes to remain positive constantly and is always ready to lend advice. One of his core beliefs is that everyone has something special inside them. His appearance remains the same.

C.J.: An anthropomorphic frog who first appeared in JumpStart 2nd Grade. His design in My First Adventure and The Legend of Grizzly McGuffin resembles one of the tadpoles from JumpStart Explorers and JumpStart Animal Adventures, while his appearance in the other two games bears a much stronger resemblance to his design in the JumpStart Advanced games made in 2002, with the largest changes being shoes, pants, a slightly altered shirt, and, in the case of Quest for the Color Meister, the addition of hiking boots. His Color Meister version also carries a whip largely resembling that of Indiana Jones. C.J. loves to explore, go on quests, and find ancient treasures, and he likes to be prepared for new adventures. He also has a sidekick, Edison the firefly.

Hops: Known as "Hopsalot" or "Mr. Hopsalot" in other games, Hops is a light-brown, anthropomorphic rabbit in JumpStart Kindergarten. His appearance varies significantly from game to game, but he wears blue and has small buck teeth in three 3D Virtual World games. As in many previous games, he is smart by nature and talented at creating hi-tech machines and gadgets. He has the additional ambition of becoming a secret agent in this game.

Pierre: Though Pierre was portrayed as a polar bear in all games made before JumpStart Phonics Read & Rhyme, his design has since changed, and he is now a blue-and-white panda who wears a purple belt with a large golden buckle and a vest. He made his debut in JumpStart Preschool. As in many earlier games, he is fond of listening to and playing music. He also likes dancing in Virtual World games, and is now good at brainteasers as well.

Kisha: Like Pierre, Kisha's species has been altered. Though long portrayed as a koala, in JumpStart Phonics Read & Rhyme her species is changed, and she is now depicted as a tiger with a large brown tuft of hair, large purple glasses, and a purple dress. She made her debut in JumpStart Preschool. Like her previous incarnation, she is a talented and passionate artist. She now enjoys athletic activities as well, and also loves fashion. Later in JumpStart Academy, her species is now changed back as a koala.

Eleanor: As in many previous games, Eleanor is an anthropomorphic, pink elephant with a purple dress and hair bow who loves to read. She also enjoys pretending to be a fairy princess, and often reads fairy tales to her teddy bear. She is cheerful and high in physical strength, and made her debut in JumpStart Preschool.

Botley: A robot who first appeared in JumpStart Adventures 3rd Grade: Mystery Mountain. Like Frankie, he is virtually unchanged visually. He does not typically go on adventures with the other characters, but instead keeps things running smoothly, as well as storing and recording information. He is fascinated with the natural world, always seeking out new information to learn.

== Game updates ==
In July 2016, an update to World of JumpStart that changed the user avatar graphics as well as added a number of new areas was launched. Due to the avatar graphics change, the update has largely been met with a negative reaction by the game's community.
