= JumpStart Advanced 2nd Grade =

- The 2007 cover of JumpStart Advanced 2nd Grade
- Developer: Knowledge Adventure
- Publisher: Knowledge Adventure
- Series: JumpStart
- Platforms: Windows, Macintosh
- Release: 2002
- Genre: Educational
- Mode: Single-player

JumpStart Advanced 2nd Grade is a personal computer game created by Knowledge Adventure. It replaced the previous JumpStart 2nd Grade, which was released in 1996. As its name suggests, it was made to teach second grade students. From 2003–2008, it was distributed as the "Fundamentals" disc in a 3- or 4-disc package of the same name, though recently a factory error in some packages caused the Fundamentals disc to be replaced by JumpStart 3D Virtual World: The Quest for the Color Meister going by the same name.

Like the original version, this game prominently features the frog C.J. and his sidekick Edison the firefly, but also includes characters from other JumpStart games, such as Hopsalot the rabbit, who originally appeared in JumpStart Kindergarten, as well as Frankie the dog who first appeared in JumpStart 1st Grade.

Additionally, the plot is more complex than the original and involves an anthropomorphic snail called Dr. O doing evil deeds, such as vandalizing "Mount Jumpmore" (a parody of Mount Rushmore) by painting moustaches on all the faces. The JumpStart characters (in the form of the "JumpStart Intelligence Agency", or J.I.A.) must fix up the damage Dr. O causes. Hopsalot makes plans for a machine he calls the "Soapy Shooter" which will clean up the graffiti, but he lacks the parts he requires to build it. Thus, C.J., Edison, and the player of the game travel to different continents, playing games to earn "gadget pieces". After the player plays another game in order to make the machine work, Dr. O causes another problem, requiring the user to go on another quest for gadget pieces to make Hopsalot's machines work; there are six different missions total, including inflating the island on which C.J.'s house rests (as Dr. O deflated it), ridding a schoolhouse of worms which infest it thanks to Dr. O, and thawing out a river after Dr. O turns the water into ice cubes.

== Character details ==
All of the characters below are anthropomorphic animals. Also, most of the characters are not wearing their "normal" outfit in JumpStart Advanced 2nd Grade; that is, the outfits they wear in this game are not the same ones they wore in other games released around the same time.

Frankie (voiced by Dee Bradley Baker): Frankie is a wiener dog who first appeared in JumpStart 1st Grade. In this product, he is the head of the JumpStart Intelligence Agency and is prominent on the box art, but despite these points, he does not play as big a part as other characters, such as C.J. Frog, and seems to be more of a mascot than a main character. In this game, he is a semi-light brown in color and wears a white tuxedo suit (though his outfit on the box art is much different). In most other games released around the time, such as other JumpStart Advanced titles, he wore a red sweater with yellow lining and a blue dog collar. Though the box art seems to suggest Frankie going on daredevil missions, he never does so in the game; he simply stays at headquarters while C.J. does the adventuring. Frankie's taking on of leadership roles is common in recent games.

Hopsalot (voiced by Brianne Siddall): Referred to as "Mr. Hopsalot" in some other products and nicknamed "Hops", Hopsalot is a rabbit who first appeared in JumpStart Kindergarten. In this game, as in other games in the JumpStart Advanced series, he seems to be naturally bright and is talented at creating new inventions. In this product, he appears to be the scientist for the J.I.A., is light brown in color, and wears goggles with a white suit. His "normal outfit" at the time of the original JumpStart Advanced was simply a teal T-shirt.

C.J. (voiced by Joshua Seth): A frog and one of the main characters, C.J. first appeared in the original JumpStart 2nd Grade game. As in his original appearance, he is adventurous. His looks are different from his original looks, however; he is more thinner and taller, making him look somewhat more like a human, is bright green, and wears sunglasses, a light coat, and, like his original incarnation, a hat. His normal outfit at the time contained a tan shirt, pants, a brown vest, and lacked sunglasses (though the hat is the same). He is occasionally referred to as "Pond" by Frankie and Dr. O, a possible James Bond reference.

Edison (voiced by Dee Bradley Baker): C.J.'s firefly sidekick who also debuts in the original 2nd Grade. In this game, he seems to dislike adventuring (once expressing that he wishes the gadget pieces were hidden in "quiet places" like golf courses and petting zoos) and, as in most games made after 2nd Grade where he appears, sports an Irish-sounding accent. His looks are different from his original appearance: he is blue-green in color with a different hat and outfit. He is possibly named after Thomas Edison, the inventor of the light bulb.

Lucy (voiced by Kath Soucie): A female frog resembling C.J. in some ways, but with a darker color and red lipstick. She appears in the different continents that C.J. and Edison visits as an "agent in the field", though she always says her name is some sort of variant of Lucy; for example, she calls herself "Dr. Lucicle" in Antarctica and "Lucianova" in Russia (Europe). She wears sunglasses like C.J. and her eyes are never seen (C.J.'s eyes are, however, shown in the beginning cutscene).

Dr. O: A snail and the game's main villain, Dr. O is a snail with yellow-orange body, a large brown shell, a monocle, and a brown shirt with a red tie. He does various evil-doings, especially vandalism, which must be fixed using machines Hopsalot creates. Not surprisingly, he dislikes CJ, and to some extent, they seem to have a rivalry. He bears an uncanny resemblance to the character Dr. Listick, a villain who appeared in the older JumpStart Reading for Second Graders and the book CJ and the Mysterious Map.

Despite appearing in other JumpStart Advanced games, Casey Cat, Pierre Polar Bear, Eleanor Elephant, and Kisha Koala are absent from JumpStart Advanced 2nd Grade, not including the All-Star feature and the cameo made by Kisha, Eleanor and Casey as faces on Mount Jumpmore (a parody of Mount Rushmore). A few of the comments made by these characters in the All-Star feature (and the fact that they all are wearing shades) seems to indicate that they are intelligence agents themselves, even though they do not appear in the main game.

== Gameplay ==
The main menu of the game is the J.I.A. headquarters. A small world map is displayed and there are several red dots on the map to click on. Once a dot is clicked, C.J. and Edison will drive to the location it represents. Once they are at the location, Lucy will introduce herself (with a different name each time). The player can then click on different clickable things to hear facts about them. In order to earn the gadget piece, though, an educational game must be played by clicking a particular thing. Usually, the games are doing some sort of favor for Lucy. Once a game is completed, Lucy will give the user a gadget piece, and it will be added to the inventory. Once a minimum of four gadget pieces are obtained, the user must head back to H.Q. to play another game in Hopsalot's laboratory in order to activate Hopsalot's machine. After this, the user clicks around at certain areas to complete some sort of task. Afterwards, news will be reported that Dr. O has done another crime, Hopsalot will explain his invention that will fix it, and the process repeats. Once all the missions are done, the game essentially starts over from the beginning and the missions are re-done in order.

== Games ==
The games are referred to by the place they are played in. As is the case of several JumpStart games, there are three levels of difficulty to determine how challenging the problems are, and a separate gameplay level that determines the difficulty of the games themselves. Also, many games must be played a certain number of rounds in order to be fully completed and for the player to receive a gadget piece.

=== Africa ===
C.J. and Edison must "uncover the secret of the cave drawings" via the user playing a game that teaches reading comprehension. The user must read a short story. Some pictures must be placed on a background to explain what the story says. For example, if the story says that a bird is in a tree, the user must place a picture of a bird onto the tree in the background. Sometimes, players may have to place blocks of text onto a blank background rather than images on illustrated backgrounds.

=== Antarctica ===
"Dr. Lucicle" (Lucy) must cure sick penguins, but they are on the other side of a body of water. In order to make a bridge for the penguins to cross, the player must put ice flows with pictures or text on them in a particular order. For example, the player must sometimes put words in alphabetical order, Roman numerals in counting order, or pictures of an animal or plant's life cycle in the order they happen.

=== Australia ===
In order to obtain some mail for Lucy (as a mail carrier) to deliver, C.J. must drive a car to the mail bag, collecting gas cans to make sure the car does not run out of fuel. The arrow keys are used to maneuver the car and the space bar is used to shoot a type of laser that can be used to destroy obstacles. The gas cans will have text next to them. C.J. will say what kind of text must be next to the gas can in order for the gas to be beneficial for the fuel tank. For example, C.J. will sometimes ask that gas with odd numbers be collected or gas with even numbers be collected, meaning that this game sometimes teaches mathematics. He will sometimes also ask things related to language arts/reading, such as asking the player to collect gas with words that have a blend in them or words with a digraph in them. If a fuel can is shot, C.J. will read the text near it out loud.

=== France, Europe ===
This country actually has two games. One is a painting game that gives no gadget piece upon completion. The other game features an art gallery that is missing some artwork. In each round, there is a room with three pieces of artwork in it and an empty frame. C.J. will explain that the room has a certain type of artwork in it, for example, artwork with a monochromatic, polychromatic, or black-and-white color scheme, portraits, landscapes, etc. The task is to find a picture of the same type in the basement of the museum (which must be accessed by clicking an arrow). In the basement, C.J. will hold a broom and must be guided around using the arrow keys. The whole basement is dirty, but whenever C.J. moves around, the space he is on is cleaned off. The space bar is used to look at the picture inside a crate. If the crate has the right type of art inside, C.J. must push it out through the door. There must be a clean, dirt-free path to the door, however. Additionally, C.J. has three brooms (lives) to begin with. If C.J. touches an enemy dirt devil, he will lose a broom and go back to his starting position. Also, if a dust devil touches a space C.J. has cleaned off, it will become dirty again. The process repeats until the final round in which the player goes to the painting game to fill in the final space.

=== New Orleans, Louisiana, United States, North America ===
In this game (which teaches music), there is a missing section in a piece of music. The players must choose the correct note(s) to put into the missing space. There is an additional mode in which they can create own music.

=== Russia, Europe ===
This game resembles some form of board game featuring red and black checkers-styled spaces and snowman game pieces. The game pieces hold signs of different colors, each with a word on it. The goal is to get one of C.J.'s pieces to the other side of the board before Lucianova (Lucy/the computer) gets hers to the other side of the board. The players can block Lucy's pieces if they are holding the same color sign as the piece they are blocking with. There is also a plank at the bottom of the screen stating an additional way to block opponent's pieces, i.e. blocking opponents pieces with antonyms (referring to the word on the sign).

=== South America ===
A Frogger-like game where the player makes C.J. walk and hop on logs, turtles, and alligators by using the arrow keys. A question will be displayed at the bottom of the screen which Edison will read out loud. C.J. must reach the island containing the correct answer to the question. This game can teach a variety of subjects, including coins of the United States, mathematics, and language arts. If C.J. is guided to jump into the water, C.J. will swim back to shore, despite the fact that it would be quicker to swim to a floating object.

=== Hopsalot's Laboratory ===
This game does not earn the user gadget pieces; instead, it is something that must be accomplished after at least 4 gadget pieces are obtained. This game can be accessed on two ways. One is to click the star above the world map at the headquarters which will only appear if the user has at least 4 gadget pieces. The other way is by clicking on a bookshelf (also at the headquarters). If the players choose the star, they will use the gadget pieces they have earned from the games and the invention featured will be the one that Hopsalot is using to fix Dr. O's misdoings. Once Hopsalot's Laboratory is completed when accessed by the star, progress will be made in the game, but if the bookshelf is clicked, gadget pieces will not be the ones the user has obtained, progress will not be made in the game, and the invention featured will not be one that is used to fix Dr. O's wrongs. In other words, the "bookshelf mode" can be viewed as a kind of practice mode to improve skills used in the "star mode", to have fun, and/or for educational value. Usually in the game, there will be a ball at one side of the screen and Hopsalot's invention on the other. The player must arrange different gadget pieces in different places to get the ball to touch the invention. The ball will bounce off some gadget pieces, will be propelled by some gadget pieces, and will have other reactions from other pieces. Sometimes, things are a bit different (i.e. sometimes a block is involved). This game is supposed to teach logic.
