= JumpStart Adventures 6th Grade: Mission Earthquest =

1998 video game

- The 2000 cover of JumpStart Adventures 6th Grade
- Developer: Knowledge Adventure
- Publisher: Knowledge Adventure
- Series: JumpStart
- Platforms: Windows, Macintosh
- Release: October 19, 1998
- Genre: Educational/adventure
- Mode: Single-player

JumpStart Adventures 6th Grade: Mission Earthquest is a game created by Knowledge Adventure in the JumpStart series. In this game A.R.T., a computer with artificial intelligence, has gone haywire, and now wants to "redesign the chaotic system that is Earth". Zack and Jess, twin brother and sister agents of Earthquest, stop him with the help of their Uncle Eli and dog Roswell. A.R.T. seems to be inspired by HAL 9000 from the film 2001: A Space Odyssey.

JumpStart 6th Grade is now part of a 5-disc set called JumpStart Advanced 4th-6th Grade, along with JumpStart Adventures 5th Grade: Jo Hammet, Kid Detective, JumpStart Adventures 4th Grade: Sapphire Falls, and two bonus discs.

== Subjects ==
- Language arts
- Math
- Data interpretation
- Percents
- Geometry
- Biology
- Geology
- Zoology
- History
- Geography
- Fine arts

== Characters ==
- Zack

Zack is a male human with blond hair and is one of the main characters in the game. Although clearly not mean, Zack seems to have a bit more "attitude" then Jess and is rude on a few occasions. He also appeared in JumpStart SpyMasters: Unmask the Prankster, JumpStart SpyMasters: Max Strikes Back, and Adventure Challenge (also called Far-Out Field Trips, Ultimate Field Trips, and Extreme Field Trips), all in which he does not seem as rude as he does in his original appearance.

- Jess

Jess is Zack's twin sister and one of the main characters. Her hair is short and red and she doesn't seem to have as much attitude as Zack. Like her brother, she has appeared in JumpStart SpyMasters: Unmask the Prankster, JumpStart SpyMasters: Max Strikes Back, and Adventure Challenge.

- Uncle Eli

Uncle Eli is one of the main characters. Intelligent, with gray hair, and wearing a green shirt and glasses, he helps Zack and Jess in different ways to accomplish their missions.

- Roswell

A dog, Roswell is blue in color and helps capture A.R.T.'s robots before they are taken to the Robot Re-Organizer.

- Enos

A brown-colored monkey, Enos was sent on a rocket ship with A.R.T. at the start of the game - before A.R.T. even caused trouble - because the human astronauts were asking for too much money. While in space, A.R.T. told Enos that "there's been a change of plans" and that he would use robots to redesign Earth, in which Enos promptly freaked out in response to and pressed the S.O.S. button. This apparently ended up sending an image of him and A.R.T. to Earthquest, while A.R.T. cut a wire to prevent anything else from being sent. Upon seeing it, Uncle Eli then told Jess & Zack about A.R.T., and the adventure began.

- A.R.T.

The main villain, A.R.T. is a computer with artificial intelligence who desires to redesign Earth using robotic menaces than Zack and Jess are to conquer. He is said to have evil logic, as Uncle Eli noticed it when he helped develop him.

=== Avoid the Bots ===
- Shark Bots are from the activity Mine Games.
- Toxic Bots are from Pollution Solution.
- Viro Bots are from the activity Viral Vanguard.
- Bug Bots are from the activity in Insect Overthrow.
- Scorpion Bots are from the activity from Monument Mischief. The First Level has two Scorpions and the second and fourth level has three Scorpions. The player has to prevent Scorpions to touch a pod.

== Games ==
To save the world and complete the game, the user must go on missions by choosing one from the Mission Locator Map. At the start of each mission, the user must choose either Zack or Jess to be their partner. There are six different game types. After one type of game is completed, the user captures one of A.R.T.'s robots and take them to the Robot Re-Organizer. Once all the robots are captured and reorganized, then the game is completed. After a type of game is completed, the user may continue to play that type of game, though it will not bring them closer to the end. Each type of game has three places in the world where they may be played.

=== Hyper Space ===
After the user chooses a mission, the character they pick takes off in a pod. Uncle Eli explains that these pods are designed for maximum security and that, in order to land, the student must discover the pod's landing code. The game where this is done is virtually identical to the Music Hall Door game in JumpStart 3rd Grade. The difference is that instead of reorganizing letters for the words, they pick the correct word or phrase from three choices.

=== Pollution Solution ===
A.R.T.'s robots have sabotaged a factory. The user must stop the noxious poisons from being released into the environment. There is a math problem that appears at the top the screen and four answers. Obviously, the user must select the correct answer before the barrel is over flow. Naturally, there are toxin puddles and tox-o-bots to avoid. The three places in the world this game may be played are Alaska, Ukraine, and Indonesia.

=== Mine Games ===
A.R.T. is planting mines in the ocean. The user must deactivate the bomb by finding the correct answer to a problem at the top of the screen. The question may either be an English language or Geography question. Naturally, there are two shark bots to avoid, and supplies for energy to gain pod life back. The three places in the world where this game may be played are the Great Barrier Reef, the Bering Sea, and the Caribbean Sea.

=== Viral Vanguard ===
A.R.T. is killing endangered species with Viro-Bots. The pod has been shrunken to the size of a cell. The user uses the arrow keys to drive the cell pod through the animal while avoiding Viro-Bots. There will be a science question at the top of the screen and the user must select the correct answer to continue traveling through the animal. At the end they move the pod over the Viro-Bots (they make them disappear this time, instead of damaging the pod), leave the animal and the players have to return to EarthQuest. The animal traveled through varies depending on the place in the world the game is played. In India it is a tiger, in Australia it is a wombat, and in California it is a condor.

=== Insect Overthrow ===
A.R.T. is placing locks around trees to stop them from growing. The user must move the pod around on the tree rings. A math problem appears at the top and the user must find the answer and drag it to the center. Naturally, there are any nasty bugs and sap to avoid. Also, there are supplies of coal for more energy to restore a pod. This game is played in Germany, Japan, and Appalachia.

=== Canopy Crusade ===
A robot of A.R.T.'s that resembles a bulldozer is destroying the rainforest. There will be a science question at the top of the screen and the student must move the helicopter pod around and select the bag with the corresponding answer and drop it in the area where the bulldozer is at work. After answering five questions, the user plays a tic-tac-toe game. The places in the world where this game may be played are Gabon, Guyana, and Hawaii.

=== Monument Mischief ===
A.R.T.'s robots are now destroying the world landmarks. The players must move the pogo-pod around the monument. On the left side of the screen there is a passage about ancient history with blanks in it. When the pogo-pod lands on a particular brick, it will light up with a color that matches the color of one of the blanks in the passage and it will fill a word. If they think it is the right word they would select it. When all the blanks are filled in, the user returns the pogo-pod to the top of the screen. Naturally, the players must avoid scorpion-bots while on the monument. Also, there is a bag of coal with energy. If they snag a coal, it will gain their bonus pod life back. The background varies depending on the country where the game is played. The countries are Egypt, Greece, and China.

=== Robot Re-Organizer ===
After one of A.R.T.'s robots is captured, it is taken to the Robot Re-Organizer. To make sense of the information from the robot, they user must match the first and second part of idioms. For each one, they are given a coordinate.

=== Space Scan ===
The student is then asked to plot the coordinate points from the Robot Re-Organizer activity on a grid. The points correspond to where A.R.T. was when he made his last transmission, although technically, this cannot work for the grid is 2-dimensional and A.R.T. is in outer space, meaning that it would need 3 dimensions. Once the four points are plotted, the area is scanned for signs of A.R.T., who won't be found until the last robot is captured.

=== Epilogue ===
A.R.T. is found in space when all the robots are recovered and scanned. The team heads on over to A.R.T.'s position. The game ends with A.R.T. being used for bowling.
