= Jumpstart 4th Grade =

Jumpstart 4th Grade refers to two very different educational products created by Knowledge Adventure:

- JumpStart Adventures 4th Grade: Haunted Island
- JumpStart Adventures 4th Grade: Sapphire Falls
