= JumpStart Adventures 5th Grade: Jo Hammet, Kid Detective =

1997 video game

- The city of Hooverville where the game takes place
- Developer: Knowledge Adventure
- Publisher: Knowledge Adventure
- Series: JumpStart
- Platforms: Windows, Macintosh
- Release: 1997
- Genre: Educational/adventure
- Mode: Single-player

JumpStart Adventures 5th Grade: Jo Hammet, Kid Detective is an educational/adventure computer game in the JumpStart series, created by Knowledge Adventure in 1997 and intended for fifth grade students.

== Development ==
Though the game itself has never been significantly updated (beyond the addition of a printable workbook and assessment test when the game was released with new packaging on August 26, 1998), it has been repackaged several times; once with the addition of the Adventure Challenge (later called Extreme Field Trips) bonus disc (July 25, 2000), once as JumpStart Advanced 5th & 6th Grade (together with Extreme Field Trips and JumpStart Adventures 6th Grade: Mission Earthquest) on June 6, 2003, and once more in 2007 as JumpStart Advanced 4th-6th Grade School Essentials (together with JumpStart Adventures 4th Grade: Sapphire Falls, JumpStart Adventures 6th Grade: Mission Earthquest, Math & Science Challenge, and Language Arts Challenge).

== Plot ==
JumpStart Adventures 5th Grade: Jo Hammet, Kid Detective covers curricula subjects such as art history, geography, math, language, science, and US History. Throughout the course of the game, which is set in the fictional city of Hooverville, the user must (while playing the role of female fifth grade detective Jo Hammet) thwart the schemes of the evil Dr. X, who is planning to destroy factories and power plants to get revenge on them for cutting his research funding.

== Games ==
=== The Hooverville Museum of Art and Geography ===
The game is divided in a series of six missions, each corresponding to a different sabotaged site. Each mission begins at the Hooverville Museum of Art and Geography. Here, a talking lab rat named B.F. Skinny delivers Jo a crossword with clues relating to the museum's exhibits. The user must help Jo solve the crossword by touring the museum for answers. Once the crossword is completed, Jo unscrambles highlighted letters to reveal the address of the sabotaged site.

The rooms of the museum deal with the following topics:

- Geography
- Renaissance & Baroque art
- Symbolist, Romantic, Rococo, Realist & Pre-Raphaelite art
- Impressionist art
- Modern art & Photography

=== Lockpicking ===
Jo arrives at the sabotaged site with the door locked. Each lock is in the shape of an equilateral triangle, consisting of four identical smaller triangles. These smaller triangles contain a different math problem on all three sides that the user must solve. These problems involve adding, subtracting, multiplying, or dividing two numbers. Once all the problems are solved, the user has to rotate and move around the pieces so that touching sides equal the same number. Two locks must be picked on each mission.

=== Grammar ===
This activity is similar to the Cemetery activity from JumpStart Adventures 4th Grade: Haunted Island. Jo uses glasses given to her in the first mission to read the thoughts of Dr. X's henchmen. The user must fill in the missing portions of their thoughts by selecting a word that matches the part of speech asked for. Once all the words are filled in, Jo notes down all the things she will need to safely reach the bomb. Jo proceeds to skateboard around Hooverville in search of these items.

=== The Dungeon ===
Sometimes, while travelling between locations, the user must play a side-scrolling skateboard minigame, where the goal is to avoid getting caught by Dr. X's henchmen. Should the user fail, the henchmen throw Jo in a dungeon. To escape, the user must stack boxes (using the rules of Tower of Hanoi) to reach a broken window.

=== The Squishy Juice Bar ===
At the juice bar, Jo must speak with her friend Bernie, an undercover newspaper reporter posing as the bartender. He gives her one of the items she needs in exchange for helping mix up drinks. In the activity, the user is given a recipe to follow, as well as 6 beakers of varying size. Each beaker is labelled with a different fraction. They must be used to collect the correct amount of each juice stated in the recipe. On harder difficulties, the user must also pour the correct fraction of mixed drinks to satisfy customer orders.

=== Jimmy's Junkyard ===
The junkyard at the edge of town is run by a shady figure known as Jimmy "the Shadow". He gives Jo one of the items she needs in exchange for helping compact pieces of junk. The activity is essentially a tangram puzzle, where the user must arrange the seven tangram pieces into the desired shape, given by a diagram on the top-right corner of the screen.

=== The Boulder Canyon Mine Shaft ===
The Boulder Canyon mine shaft is operated by Maggie Mead, a ranger studying artefacts from the mine, but she is unwilling to personally enter the mines because she is afraid of the dark. She gives Jo an item in exchange for going down the mine shaft and retrieving the objects she needs. The mines are divided into three layers; Maggie needs one artefact from each layer. The top layer contains artefacts from colonial America and the American Revolution. The middle layer consists of artefacts from Native American history. The bottom layer contains artefacts relating to geology and Earth science.

=== Bomb disarming ===
Once Jo has all the items she needs, she returns to the sabotaged site and safely retrieves the bomb. In the activity to disarm the bomb, the user must navigate an android around a circuit attached to several batteries. Each battery is labelled with a different decimal number. The goal of the activity is to switch the batteries on and off, such that the sum of all the batteries switched on equals a target number given on screen. There are also defence androids chasing the player down. Should they make contact with the player, the bomb immediately detonates. Jo then appears on screen, breaking the fourth wall, and resetting the game.

Once the bomb has been disarmed, Jo returns to the museum and gets a new crossword, starting the next mission. At the end of the final mission, Jo is warned that Dr. X is planning on blowing up Boulder Canyon Dam (modelled upon the Hoover Dam), destroying all of Hooverville in the process. Jo manages to divert the water just before the bomb blows up, but discovers Dr. X has mysteriously disappeared.
