= JumpStart Preschool =

1995 educational video game

- Developer: Knowledge Adventure
- Publisher: Knowledge Adventure
- Platform: Microsoft Windows
- Release: July 1995
- Genre: Edutainment

JumpStart Preschool is a 1995 educational video game and third installment of the JumpStart franchise by Knowledge Adventure, after JumpStart Kindergarten (1994) and JumpStart 1st Grade (1995). It would later be re-released as JumpStart Preschool in August 1998 and superseded by a new title JumpStart Advanced Preschool in 2002. It is also known as Jump Ahead Preschool in Europe.

== Development and release ==
The game, which was "researched and developed under the direction of preschool teachers and parents", was shipped on August 28, 1995. Bill Gross, founder and chairman of Knowledge Adventure, noted that it was the company's first educational software program that "includes the full preschool curriculum". JumpStart Preschool was made available through computer software stores, mass merchants, computer superstores, book stores and computer specialty stores. A three-title bundle called JumpStart Preschool Deluxe was released on September 3, 1996, featuring JumpStart Preschool, JumpStart Pre-K and an Activity Discovery Book. Of the 1998 re-release, Peter Doctorow, vice president of product development at Knowledge Adventure noted that it was the first JumpStart program to include the company's new Kid's Assessment Technology (where players complete a cross-curricular assessment test and difficulty levels are automatically determined) and Parent Resource Center (which links progress reports between JumpStart titles).

It was adapted as the 1999 direct-to-video animated film JumpStart Preschool: Who Left the Juice in the Caboose?.

== Plot and gameplay ==
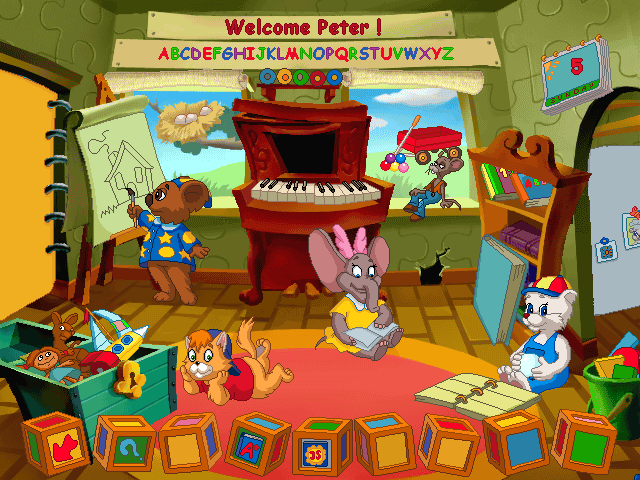
Inside the Jumpstart Schoolhouse, where users can select their classroom activity.

The title focuses on educational concepts for preschoolers, specifically covering: reading readiness, memory development, numeral recognition, and auditory discrimination. Preschool teachers and caregivers could track the player's improvement via a Progress Report, while JumpStart's Adaptive Learning Technology tracked the player's success-to-attempt ratio and modified the difficulty accordingly.

Gameplay takes place in and around a schoolhouse. The user plays alongside five characters: Kisha the Koala, Pierre the Bear, Eleanor the Elephant, Casey the Cat, and Cecil the Mouse. Upon completing a classroom activity, the player receives a train ticket. After collecting four train tickets, they can be redeemed for a ride on the train, during which one of twelve randomly selected songs plays. Songs range in length from approximately 40 seconds to just over one minute. Players also receive a stamp in their JumpStart passport for each unique land visited during the train ride.

== Critical reception ==
SuperKids praised the game's "cute characters, amusing activities, and magical worlds". The Chicago Tribune noted the surreptitious learning opportunity of the game, which had a façade of fun. Cyber-Reviews deemed the re-release superior due to the "improved graphics, motivational rewards (this is important information for the parents) an assessment technology that customizes for a child's individual needs". Young kids and computers deemed it a "solid program with well-designed activities". Child Care Information Exchange noted that while it contained more activities than Millie & Bailey Preschool, they "lack the range of concepts and the skilful embedding" offered by the latter. MacUser suggested that players were meant to 'graduate' from JumpStart Toddlers to JumpStart Preschool, then to Kindergarten, 1st Grade, and 2nd Grade.

== Commercial performance ==
According to PC Data Interactive, in the period of January 1996 through March 1998, in aggregate dollars JumpStart Preschool was the best selling preschool software program.

== Awards ==
Year	Nominee / work	Award	Result
1999	JumpStart Preschool	Interactive Achievement Award for Computer Educational Title of the Year (0–8 years)	Won
