= Isaac Asimov's Science Adventure =

1992 educational video game

Isaac Asimov's Science Adventure is an educational interactive CD-ROM. The game was later updated as Isaac Asimov's Science Adventure II. It is part of Knowledge Adventure's Adventure series.

== Production and content ==
Isaac Asimov died in April 1992, and this collaboration between his works and the developers behind the program was one of his last projects before he passed. The game's articles were based on Asimov's Chronology of Science and Discovery. The game teaches topics ranging from roller coaster acceleration to planetary orbit to pulleys.

The central hub of the program is a reference screen, which displays text panels, pictures, and timeline, and a globe. The designers described the program as an educational software toy - a sort of intellectual playground, to encourage curiosity but with no agenda. The virtual science museum has over 150 rooms, and over 1000 illustrated, interactive, and interlinked articles by Isaac Asimov.

== Critical reception ==
PC Magazine included it in its list of the Top 100 CD-ROMS, commenting on its "spectacular computer graphics" and high quality articles. The magazine recommended it as a holiday gift . Compute magazine thought the title was well produced and impressive technically. New Scientist felt the title had excellent graphics and interface. The program was highly recommended by The New York Times.
