= Karen M. Hilderbrand =

American songwriter and author

- Born: July 16, 1962 (age 63); Akron, Ohio
- Occupations: Songwriter, author
- Years active: 1987–present

Karen Mitzo Hilderbrand (born 1962) is an American songwriter and author publishing children's educational materials, based in Akron, Ohio.

== Early life and education ==
Hilderbrand was born Karen Mitzo on July 16, 1962, along with her twin sister Kim. She attended Purdue University and graduated in 1985 with a degree in Industrial Engineering.

== Career ==
Hilderbrand began writing songs in 1987 with her sister Kim Thompson, and after five years they began working full-time to create educational materials. They have since created more than 500 albums, written 3,000 songs and produced 160 e-books and 700 audiobooks. They have also produced 15 mobile apps. Hilderbrand is the CEO of Creative IP, LLC. and Twin Sisters Digital Media, headquartered in Stow, Ohio. In 2012, Scholastic announced a distribution agreement with Twin Sisters for musical and non-fiction e-books.

== Discography ==
Hilderbrand and Thompson have total album sales of more than 50 million, including one RIAA certified platinum and eight certified gold albums. All albums are released under the Twin Sisters Productions label.

Title	Details	Certifications	Sales
Phonics	Certification date: August 21, 2000; Format: Album	US: Gold	
Christmas Through the Eyes of a Child	Certification date: December 6, 2002; Format: Album	US: Gold	
Classical Music	Certification date: January 18, 2006; Format: Album	US: Gold	
2002 Christmas Jazz	Certification date: February 13, 2006; Format: Album	US: Gold	
102 Children's Songs	Certification date: February 13, 2006; Format: Album	US: Gold	
Nature Sounds	Certification date: October 26, 2006; Format: Album	US: Platinum	2,000,000+
Traditional Lullabies	Certification date: September 28, 2007; Format: Album	US: Gold	
Christmas Memories	Certification date: October 3, 2007; Format: Album	US: Gold	
Acoustic Christmas	Certification date: July 15, 2008; Format: Album	US: Gold	

== Awards and recognitions ==
- National Parenting Publications (NAPPA) Gold Award (1999, 2000, 2002, 2005, 2007, 2009, 2010)
- Dr. Toy's 10 Best Toys Winner (2009)
- Learning Magazine's Teachers Choice Award (1995, 2002, 2004)
- iParenting Media Award (2003, 2004)
- National Parenting Center Seal of Approval (2001, 2002, 2003, 2004, 2005, 2007, 2009)
- National Parenting Publications Award (2012)
- Smart Business Magazine Northeast Ohio Smart 50 Award (2017)
- Voting member of The Recording Academy (NARAS)
- Prior member of Society of Women Engineers
- Prior member of Recording Industry Association of America (RIAA)
