= Mike Gatten =

Michael Gatten
- Born: July 15, 1965 (age 60); San Luis Obispo, California, United States
- Occupation: Inventor of the Miracle Blanket
- Spouse: Mindi Gatten
- Children: Chandler, Taylor and Jake
- Parent(s): Martha R. and Bill J. Gatten

Mike Gatten, (born July 15, 1965) Deceased July 5 2018, was an American entrepreneur and inventor of the Miracle Blanket which is a stretchy blanket designed to help babies sleep comfortably. Before inventing the Miracle Blanket, Mike worked for different companies and was invested successful business ventures. He then founded AMB Enterprises in 2003 to manufacture, sell and distribute the Miracle Blanket. "AMB" stood for "Amazing Miracle Blanket". In 2009, he launched Miracle Fulfillment, LLC to distribute Miracle Industries, LLC products as well as shipping, distribution and fulfillment for national companies selling their products. Gatten was also the executive producer and drummer for the band Chasing Disaster, which released its first album in January 2011. Chasing Disaster was nominated by the New Mexico Music Awards in the “Main Stream Rock” [sic?] category for its album Bullet for a Rose.

== Miracle Blanket ==
Gatten designed the Miracle Blanket and tested and researched the blanket over a year before he set up distribution channels to make his product available to the public in late 2002. The Miracle Blanket won numerous awards such as the iParenting Media “Hot Product”, Fussy Baby Approved “Top Colic Product”, the National Parenting Center Seal of Approval(NAPPA). and the Moms Best Awards Outstanding Product Over a million miracle blankets have been sold
