= JumpStart Typing =

1997 video game

- Developers: Knowledge Adventure; Van Duyne Engineering
- Publisher: Knowledge Adventure
- Series: JumpStart
- Platforms: Windows, Macintosh
- Release: October 15, 1997
- Genre: Educational
- Mode: Single-player

JumpStart Typing is a personal computer game intended to teach typing skills to kids aged seven to ten. The game reuses the cast of JumpStart Adventures 3rd Grade: Mystery Mountain.

The game is set at Sparks Stadium, where keyboarding Olympics take place between the Sparks Team and the Galaxy Gladiators. When Polly Spark gets mad at Coach Qwerty, who didn't like her "untapped typing talent" and consequently kicked her off the team, she locks him in the Trophy Room. When Botley reminds her of how much her father wanted to win a new trophy for the Trophy Room, Polly decides to let Coach Qwerty out, but it turns out that her power cards needed to unlock and open the Trophy Room need to be recharged.

The user must therefore coach the Sparks Team in Qwerty's place and recharge Polly's power cards through taking timed typing tests. At the beginning of the game, the user takes a diagnostic test to determine the words per minute goals that need to be reached to activate the power cards.

== Keyboard Training Center ==
The Keyboard Training Center is run by Polly and includes the locked Trophy Room, the Technique-O-Tron and the Test-O-Matic. The Technique-O-Tron provides two humorous movies, made in a style to suggest they were made in the mid-20th century despite featuring modern computer keyboards, that teach the user about the "home row" keys and correct typing posture. The Test-O-Matic features lessons and timed typing tests. It is through taking the timed typing tests that the user attempts to reach the words per minute that activate the power cards.

== The games ==
Outside the Keyboard Training Center, Botley joins the user for the games, which the user plays to win gold, silver and bronze medals. Winning these medals do not lead to the freeing of Coach Qwerty. The user has a limited amount of "strength" to play the games and, if the "strength bar" gets too low, it must be restored through taking lessons and timed typing tests in the Keyboard Training Center. Botley may have been voiced by a new person, but he still seems the same, and none of the robots from JumpStart 3rd Grade are seen. The games are as follows:

- Roller Racer: The user helps a Sparks player skateboard down a track and avoid hitting obstacles or the mischievous Track Trickster by typing the letters that appear on them.
- Keyboard Kicks: In this foosball-esque game, the user types the letters that activate a row of Sparks players, so that they will block the ball away from the Sparks' goal. Thus Sending the ball right at the Galaxy Gladiators' goal 10 points are needed to be scored in the game to win.
- Trail Blazer: The user helps fifty Sparks snowboarders make it to the bottom of a mountain by typing the letters that appear above each of them.
- Cliff Hanger: The user types the letters on different ledges to help the Sparks player climb to the top of Mount Keys, while avoiding Wall Crawlers, who throw balls of slime down on the climber.
- The Fans Go Wild: The user types the letters on cards held by fans so that they turn over and form an animated message. Ms. Winkle, Polly's schoolteacher from JumpStart 3rd Grade, appears to be part of the crowd. This is the only activity in which a medal is not earned.

== The Closing Ceremony ==
After Qwerty is freed, Polly apologizes for locking him in the Trophy Room and argues that he should consider the fact that she took part in freeing him and coaching the team. He tells her that "if it takes locking me in the Trophy Room to get you to practice your keyboarding skills, then so be it" and decides not to tell Professor Spark about the incident. At the Closing Ceremony, the Professor, left with the impression that Qwerty was "mysteriously locked in a Trophy Room throughout the games", presents a trophy to the user, since Botley informed him that the user was primarily responsible for the Sparks Team winning over the Galaxy Gladiators.

As in JumpStart 3rd Grade, the storyline ends here, but the user can continue playing the games.

== Production ==
After the merge of Knowledge Adventure and Davidson & Associates, Jan Davidson began cross-developing products between the Glendale and Torrance centers and the first Knowledge Adventure product to be produced in Torrance was JumpStart Typing. Led by executive producer Mike Albanese and producer Michele Lichtenstein, JumpStart Typing was declared to be "more JumpStart than JumpStart". This effectively ended any speculation that a JumpStart title could not be produced outside of Glendale. Albanese went on to assume the role of Vice President of KA Glendale towards the end of his tenure at what was then Cendant Software.

== Critical reaction ==
Discovery Education praised its educational and entertainment value, saying it was best suited for practicing typing rather than learning the basics, and would appeal to children who enjoyed fast-paced games.
