= The Discoverers (video game) =

1994 video game

The Discoverers is an educational video game developed and published by Knowledge Adventure. It was released in 1994 for MS-DOS.
