= JumpStart =

- Series logo used from 1996 to 2011
- Genre: Edutainment
- Developers: Fanfare Software (1994–1995); JumpStart Games (1995–2023)
- Publisher: JumpStart Games
- Creator: Barton Listick
- Platforms: Windows, Mac, Game Boy Color, PlayStation, Wii, DS, Mobile app
- First release: JumpStart Kindergarten; November 14, 1994
- Latest release: JumpStart Academy Preschool & Kindergarten; January 22, 2019

JumpStart (known as Jump Ahead in the United Kingdom) was an educational media franchise created for children, primarily consisting of educational games. The franchise began with independent developer Fanfare Software's 1994 video game JumpStart Kindergarten. The series was expanded into other age groups and beyond games to include workbooks, direct-to-video films, mobile apps, and other media under the ownership of Knowledge Adventure, which later assumed the name JumpStart Games.

A JumpStart online virtual world was officially launched in March 2009, offering educational activities within an online environment. JumpStart Games later ended support for both their JumpStart and Math Blaster series, and the studio was closed in July 2023.

== History ==
The origin of the JumpStart franchise can be traced back to its inaugural game, JumpStart Kindergarten, developed in 1994 by the independent developer Fanfare Software and published by Knowledge Adventure. The title established the foundation for a series focused on combining educational content with interactive gameplay. Fanfare Software, recognized for developing JumpStart Kindergarten, along with subsequent titles such as JumpStart Preschool and JumpStart 1st Grade, was acquired by Knowledge Adventure in 1995. Following the acquisition, additional titles were released covering higher grade levels and subject areas.

The franchise expanded into online and mobile formats with the launch of JumpStart 3D Virtual World in 2009. Features such as Progress Reports and Adaptive Learning were incorporated to adjust content difficulty based on player performance.

JumpStart discontinued the JumpStart franchise, with support ending in June 2023. The studio closed in July, 2023.

== Plot and gameplay ==
The gameplay of the JumpStart series centers on interactive educational activities presented within narrative frameworks. Each game features tasks embedded within narratives, in which players interact with animated characters to complete challenges. The focus is on combining instructional content with gameplay elements.

Players engage in various activities that align with school curriculum requirements. The activities are designed to reinforce academic concepts through structured tasks and mini-games. Each game within the franchise typically includes a storyline where players interact with characters and the game environment to progress through challenges and activities. This narrative-driven structure provides progression through educational tasks.

The JumpStart series covers a wide range of subjects including math, language arts, science, and geography. The games require players to solve problems, complete puzzles, answer questions, and perform tasks that align with grade-level expectations. The games incorporate reward-based systems that provide in-game incentives for progress and task completions.

The franchise's educational goals are reflected in its gameplay mechanics. Players actively engage with content, applying critical thinking and problem-solving skills to overcome challenges. The narrative functions as a framework for delivering educational content interactively. The series was developed with the objective of making learning engaging for young learners.

=== Educational goals ===
The design approach of the JumpStart franchise focused on integrating education and entertainment. JumpStart utilized a three-fold approach to cater to different audiences and learning goals:

1. Grade-Based Products: These products covered curriculum topics specific to a single year of elementary or secondary school.
2. Subject-Based Products: These products focused on specific academic topics.
3. Learning Products: These products introduced foundational concepts within interactive game environments.

The franchise incorporated educational methodologies such as JumpStart Assessment Technology, JumpStart Adaptive Learning Technology, and JumpStart Tutor Technology. According to the company, these techniques were designed to adjust skill levels, modify difficulty levels based on player performance, and provide instructional support to overcome obstacles. The development process involved consultation with educators, experts, and children's advisory teams to align gameplay structure with stated educational objectives.

== Products in the franchise ==
Games	Platforms, release years and versions
JumpStart Kindergarten	MS-DOS (November 14, 1994 - V1.0); Mac, Windows (July 3, 1995 - V1.2); Mac, Windows (November 24, 1997); Mac, Windows (August 26, 1998 - V2.0); Re-released as JumpStart Kindergarten Deluxe; Mac, Windows (2001 - V2.6); Rebooted as JumpStart Advanced Kindergarten (aka JumpStart Advanced Kindergarten: Fundamentals); Mac, Windows (2002)
JumpStart 1st Grade (aka Jump Ahead Year 1 in UK)	Mac, Windows (July 3, 1995); Mac, Windows (December 2, 1996 - V1.5.0); Re-released as JumpStart 1st Grade 2000; Mac OS 7, Windows 95 (August 24, 1999 - V2.5); Re-released as JumpStart 1st Grade - Frankie's Treasure Hunt; Mac, Windows (June 21, 2000 - V2.6); Rebooted as JumpStart Advanced 1st Grade; Mac, Windows (2002)
JumpStart Preschool	Mac, Windows (August 28, 1995); Re-released as JumpStart Preschool Deluxe; Mac, Windows (August 26, 1998 - V2.1)
JumpStart 2nd Grade (aka Jump Ahead Year 2 in UK, working title JumpStart Adventures 2nd Grade)	Mac, Windows (March 25, 1996 - V1.1); Re-released as JumpStart 2nd Grade Deluxe; Mac, Windows (May 5, 2000); Rebooted as JumpStart Advanced 2nd Grade; Mac, Windows (2002)
JumpStart Toddlers	Mac, Windows (March 11, 1996); Mac, Windows (June 21, 2000); Rebooted as JumpStart Advanced Toddlers; Mac, Windows (2005)
JumpStart Pre-K	Mac, Windows (September 2, 1996): Rebooted as JumpStart Advanced Pre-K; Mac, Windows (2003)
JumpStart Advanced Readers	Mac, Windows (2004)
JumpStart Advanced Math	Mac, Windows (2005)
JumpStart Adventures 3rd Grade: Mystery Mountain	Mac, Windows (December 2, 1996 - V1.0, V1.2.0); Mac, Windows (August 26, 1998 - V1.1, V1.2, V1.4, V1.5); Re-released as JumpStart Advanced 3rd Grade; Mac, Windows (2003)
JumpStart Adventures 4th Grade: Haunted Island	Mac, Windows (December 2, 1996)
JumpStart Adventures 5th Grade: Jo Hammet, Kid Detective	Mac, Windows (October 15, 1997)
JumpStart Baby	Mac, Windows (August 26, 1998): Mac, Windows (June 21, 2000)
JumpStart Adventures 6th Grade: Mission Earthquest	Mac, Windows (October 19, 1998 - V1.2): Re-released as JumpStart Adventures 6th Grade Deluxe; Mac, Windows (July 25, 2000 - V1.2.0)
JumpStart Adventures 4th Grade: Sapphire Falls	Mac, Windows (December 3, 1999); Re-released as JumpStart Advanced 4th Grade; Mac, Windows (2003)
JumpStart Advanced Preschool (aka Frankie Pet Friends in UK, formerly known as JumpStart Advanced Preschool: Fundamentals)	Mac, Windows (September 4, 2002 - V3.0)
JumpStart Advanced Preschool World (aka JumpStart Advanced Preschool - Welcome to Storyland)	Mac, Windows (September 11, 2002 - V3.0)
JumpStart Advanced Animal Field Trip	Mac, Windows (November 6, 2002 - V1.0C)
JumpStart 3D Virtual World: My First Adventure	Mac, Windows (July 2, 2008 - V1.01C)
JumpStart 3D Virtual World: The Legend of Grizzly McGuffin	Mac, Windows (August 13, 2008 - V1.01C)
JumpStart 3D Virtual World: Trouble in Town	Mac, Windows (September 3, 2008 - V1.01C)
JumpStart 3D Virtual World: The Quest for the Color Meister	Mac, Windows (October 22, 2008 - V1.01C)
JumpStart Typing	Mac, Windows (October 15, 1997 - V1.0)
JumpStart Kindergarten Reading (aka JumpStart Reading for Kindergarteners)	Mac, Windows (November 11, 1996 - V1.0)
JumpStart 1st Grade Reading	Mac, Windows (August 12, 1997)
JumpStart 2nd Grade Reading	Mac, Windows (February 10, 1999)
JumpStart 1st Grade Math	Mac, Windows (December 16, 1997 - V1.0); Mac, Windows (February 10, 1999)
JumpStart 2nd Grade Math	Mac, Windows (December 16, 1997)
JumpStart Spanish	Mac, Windows (November 24, 1997 - V1.0)
JumpStart Spelling	Mac, Windows (October 21, 1998)
JumpStart Music	Mac, Windows (October 21, 1998)
JumpStart Numbers	Mac, Windows (October 21, 1998 - V1.0)
JumpStart ABC's	Mac, Windows (October 12, 1999 - V1.0c)
JumpStart Phonics	Mac, Windows (October 12, 1999)
JumpStart Kindergarten Math	Mac, Windows (February 10, 1999)
JumpStart Artist (aka "Art Discovery")	Mac, Windows (2001)
JumpStart Languages	Mac, Windows (2001)
JumpStart 3 Ring Circus	Mac, Windows (2001)
JumpStart Explorers	Mac, Windows (November 28, 2001)
JumpStart SpyMasters: Unmask the Prankster	Mac, Windows (2001)
JumpStart SpyMasters: Max Strikes Back	Mac, Windows (2001)
JumpStart Animal Adventures (aka "Jump Ahead Frankie Animal Adventures" in UK)	Mac, Windows (November 6, 2002 - V1.0c); Mac, Windows (2002 - V1.0d)
JumpStart Study Helpers: Math Booster	Mac, Windows (2005)
JumpStart Study Helpers: Spelling Bee	Mac, Windows (2005)
Jumpstart World: Preschool	Mac, Windows (2001)
Jumpstart World: Kindergarten	Mac, Windows (2001)
Jumpstart World: 1st Grade	Mac, Windows (2001)
Jumpstart World: 2nd Grade	Mac, Windows (2001)
Jumpstart World: Pet Playground	Mac, Windows (2006)
JumpStart Preschool: Magic of Learning	iOS, Android (2016)
JumpStart Punk Punk Blitz	iOS (2010)
JumpStart Deep Sea Escape	Nintendo DS (2011)
JumpStart Jet Pack	iOS, Online (2015)
JumpStart My ABC Book	iOS (2013)
JumpStart Art Studio	iOS (2013)
JumpStart Roller Squash	iOS (2013)
JumpStart Blast-Off: Math	iOS (2013)
JumpStart Pet Rescue	iOS (2013)
JumpStart Blast-Off: Early Reading	iOS (2014)
JumpStart Junior	iOS (2016)
JumpStart Dino Adventure Field Trip	Game Boy Color (2000)
JumpStart Wildlife Safari Field Trip	PlayStation (2001)
JumpStart Pet Rescue	Wii (2008)
JumpStart: Escape from Adventure Island	Wii (2010)
JumpStart Get Moving Family Fitness	Wii (2016)
JumpStart Crazy Karts	Wii (2011)
Jump Start Baby Book	Mac, Windows (2000)
My Learning Scrapbook	Mac, Windows (2000)
JumpStart Around the World	Mac, Windows (2000)
JumpStart Adventure Challenge	Mac, Windows (2000)
JumpStart Reading with Karaoke (later renamed JumpStart Phonics Read & Rhyme)	Mac, Windows (2005)
World of Jumpstart	Mac, Windows (2014)
JumpStart Magic & Mythies	Android, iOS, Kindle, Windows (2015)
JumpStart Buzzwords	Online (2000)
JumpStart: PreK-1st Grade: Frankie's Field Trip	DVD (2013)
JumpStart Power Prep 2nd Grade	DVD (2014)
JumpStart Power Prep 3rd Grade	DVD (2015)
JumpStart Power Prep 4th Grade	DVD (2015)
JumpStart Jukebox	VHS (2003)
JumpStart Kindergarten: Why Did the Bus Stop?	VHS (2000)
JumpStart Preschool: Who Left the Juice in the Caboose?	VHS (2000)

=== Compilations ===
Year	Title	Games
2003	JumpStart 1st - 3rd Grade Learning Playground	JumpStart Kindergarten Math (2000); JumpStart Kindergarten Reading (1996); JumpStart Explorers (2001); JumpStart Animal Adventures (2002); JumpStart SpyMasters: Unmask the Prankster (2001); JumpStart SpyMasters: Max Strikes Back (2001); JumpStart World: Preschool (2001); JumpStart World: Kindergarten (2001); JumpStart World: 1st Grade (2001); JumpStart World: 2nd Grade (2001); JumpStart Advanced Toddlers (2003); JumpStart Advanced Preschool (2002); JumpStart Advanced 1st Grade (2002); JumpStart Advanced 2nd Grade (2002); JumpStart Advanced 3rd Grade (2003); JumpStart Advanced 4th Grade (2003)
2003	JumpStart Advanced Kindergarten	JumpStart Advanced: Kindergarten Fundamentals (2002) (original, 3-disc, V1.0 and V2.0); JumpStart Advanced: Animal Field Trip (2003) (V1.0 and V2.0); JumpStart Advanced: Arts and Crafts (2003) (3-disc, V1.0 and V2.0); JumpStart World: Pet Playground (2006) (V1.0); Kid Keys: The Magical Typing Tutor (2001) (V2.0); Kindergarten Essentials (2003) (V3.0); JumpStart Blast-Off: Early Reading (2014) (V3.0); JumpStart Blast-Off: Math (2014) (V3.0); JumpStart Artist (2001) (V3.0); JumpStart Languages (2001) (V3.2)
2000	JumpStart Home Learning System	JumpStart Kindergarten (1994); JumpStart Kindergarten (1998); JumpStart 1st Grade (1995); JumpStart 1st Grade (2000); JumpStart 2nd Grade (1996); JumpStart Adventures 3rd Grade: Mystery Mountain (1996); JumpStart Adventures 4th Grade: Haunted Island (1996); JumpStart Adventures 4th Grade: Sapphire Falls (2000); JumpStart Adventures 5th Grade: Jo Hammet, Kid Detective (1997); JumpStart Adventures 6th Grade: Mission Earthquest (1998); JumpStart 1st Grade Reading (1997); JumpStart 2nd Grade Reading (1997); JumpStart 1st Grade Math (1997); JumpStart 2nd Grade Math (1998); JumpStart Typing (1997); JumpStart Spanish (1998); JumpStart Music (1998); JumpStart Numbers (1998); JumpStart Spelling (1998); JumpStart ABC's (1999); JumpStart Phonics (1999); JumpStart Around the World (2000); JumpStart Adventure Challenge (2000)
2000	JumpStart Early Development	JumpStart Baby (1998); JumpStart Baby (2000); JumpStart Toddlers (1996); JumpStart Toddlers (2000); JumpStart Preschool (1995); JumpStart Preschool (1998); JumpStart Pre-K (1996)

== Reception ==
=== Critical reception ===
JumpStart Study Helpers Math Booster and Spelling Bee were noted in coverage for allowing users to edit the math problems or words used in gameplay. Carolyn Handler Miller of Digital Storytelling: A Creator's Guide to Interactive Entertainment, wrote that the series "found just the right balance between storyline and other demands of educational titles". The series has been described as providing "safe, age appropriate" games for children. The Houston Chronicle praised the series for "offer[ing] many and varied academic activities, plenty of play-oriented pursuits, incentives to spur and reward achievement and all the interactive trimmings – cool characters, great 3-D graphics and snappy sound effects", describing the World Kindergarten, 1st Grade and 2nd Grade as notable examples of educational software.

=== Commercial performance ===
Knowledge Adventure made $35 million in sales in 1994 by selling titles such as JumpStart Kindergarten and Bug Adventures.

JumpStart Kindergarten was the 8th most popular title in the CD-ROM category in the Washington, D.C. area in the week ending on October 14, 1995, and 9th in the week ending on May 4, 1996. Throughout 1997, JumpStart Toddlers took in over $4 million. In the first half of 1997 four of the top five educational titles for Windows were JumpStart products, while four of the top ten DOS/Windows home education titles were JumpStart. Two of the top selling retail CD-roms of August 1997 were JumpStart products (5th and 6th), after Microsoft Windows 95 upgrade, Norton Utilities, Myst, and Viruscan. JumpStart 1st Grade (3rd), JumpStart Adventures 3rd Grade (4th), JumpStart 2nd Grade (5th), JumpStart Kindergarten II (6th), JumpStart Preschool (7th), JumpStart Adventures Fourth Grade (8th), JumpStart Toddlers ranked among the top-selling educational software across 13 U.S. software retail chains in the week ending on September 19, 1998. Jumpstart Preschool (2nd), Jumpstart First Grade (3rd), Jumpstart Kindergarten (7th), and Jumpstart Second Grade (8th) were also ranked among the top-selling home-education software across 13 software retail chains in the week ending on May 1, 1999.

By 2002, the series had sold over 13 million units.

=== Awards and nominations ===
As of 2017, the series has won over 300 awards.

Year	Nominee / work	Award	Result
1998	JumpStart Spanish	Parent's Choice Gold Award	Won
1999	JumpStart Adventures 6th Grade	Parent's Choice Gold Award	Won
2000	JumpStart Phonics	Computer Educational Title of the Year	Won
2001	JumpStart Languages	Parent's Choice Silver Honor	Won
2003	JumpStart Study Helpers: Spelling Bee	National Parenting Seal of Approval	Won
2005	JumpStart Reading with Karaoke	National Parenting Seal of Approval	Won
2005	JumpStart Reading With Karaoke	Parent's Choice Silver Honor	Won
2007	JumpStart World: Kindergarten	Parent's Choice Recommended	Won
2007	JumpStart World: First Grade	Parent's Choice	Won
2007	JumpStart World: Second Grade	Parent's Choice Recommended	Won
2007	JumpStart World 1st Grade	iParenting Media Award	Won
2007	JumpStart World 2nd Grade	iParenting Media Award	Won
2008	JumpStart World Kindergarten	Silver Recipient	Won
2008	JumpStart Advanced Preschool World	Toy Man Award of Excellence & eChoice Award	Won
2008		Toy Man Award of Excellence & eChoice Award	Won
2008		Toy Man Award of Excellence & eChoice Award	Won
2008		iParenting Media Awards	Won
2008	JumpStart World Kindergarten	The Toy Man Award of Excellence	Won
2008	JumpStart 3D Virtual World: The Legend of Grizzly McGuffin	National Parenting Seal of Approval	Won
2008	JumpStart 3D Virtual World: Quest for the Color Meister	National Parenting Seal of Approval	Won
2008	JumpStart 3D Virtual World: Trouble in Town	National Parenting Seal of Approval	Won
2008	JumpStart 3D Virtual World: My First Adventure	National Parenting Seal of Approval	Won
2008	JumpStart Advanced Preschool World Premium Edition	National Parenting Seal of Approval	Won
2008	JumpStart World	National Parenting Seal of Approval	Won
2011	Jumpstart.com	National Parenting Seal of Approval	Won
2012	Jumpstart	National Parenting Seal of Approval	Won
2013	JumpStart 3D Virtual World	2013 ON for Learning Award	Won
