= Brianne Siddall =

American actress (born 1963)

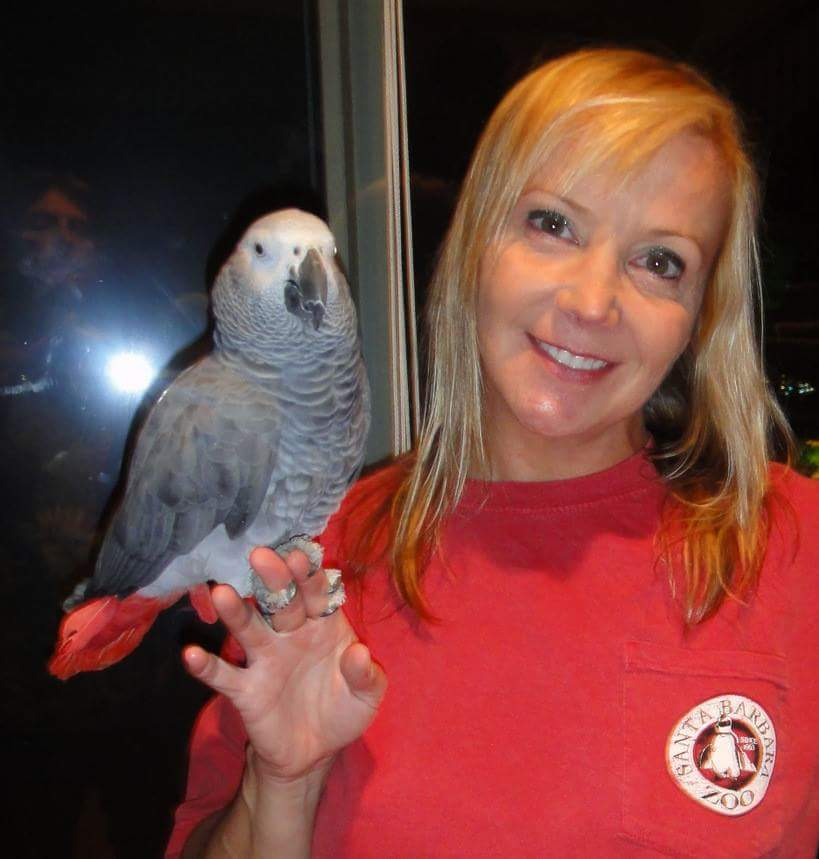
- Siddall in 2014
- Born: August 25, 1963 (age 63); Encino, California, U.S.
- Other names: Jetta E. Bumpy, Ian Hawk, Jetta Bird, Brianne Brozey
- Education: Loyola Marymount University, California State University at Northridge
- Occupation: Voice actress
- Years active: 1984–present
- Spouse: Deven Chierighino (m. 1987)
- Website: voiceactor.biz

Brianne Siddall (born August 25, 1963, in Encino, California), also known under her stage names of Jetta E. Bumpy, Ian Hawk, Murray Blue, Jetta Bird, and Brianne Brozey, is an American voice actress. She is known for voicing Tommy Himi, Koromon, Keenan Crier, and Calumon in over a hundred episodes of the popular anime Digimon and its video games, as well as for voicing Tsukasa and Elk in the anime .hack//Sign and the .hack games.

== Career ==
In the late 1990s, Siddall, under the stage name Ian Hawk, was hired to perform as the voice of Yahiko Myojin for the Sony dub of the Ruroni Kenshin anime and OAV, which premiered in the United States under the title Samurai X. This initial attempt to market the series proved unsuccessful and the series was later re-dubbed by Media Blasters, who chose to hire Bang Zoom! Entertainment to redub the series. She also voiced characters for Pioneer and Bang Zoom! including Kunikida in The Melancholy of Haruhi Suzumiya, as well as Ruby and Rina in Saint Tail. In live-action voice-over, she voiced Impus, the infant version of the character Prince Olympius, in Power Rangers Lightspeed Rescue, and Circuit the robotic owl in Power Rangers Time Force. In addition, Siddall voiced Jim Hawking, the kid crew member in Outlaw Star, which had a run on Cartoon Network's Toonami and Adult Swim programming blocks, She also voiced main character Al Izuruha in the Mobile Suit Gundam OVA, Mobile Suit Gundam 0080: War in the Pocket. She provided the voice of the toy Sage of Fijit Friends.

== Personal life ==
Siddall married producer Deven Chierighino in 1987.

In 2011, Siddall was involved in an accident on the set of NCIS: Los Angeles, where she worked as an assistant location manager. Siddall underwent surgery in 2015 to re-fuse portions of her vertebrae and the pain from the injuries and surgeries has made it difficult for her to speak.

Prior to Siddall's accident, she was an active runner and participated in several marathons.

She has a grey parrot named Jetta.

== Filmography ==
=== Anime ===
List of voice performances in anime
Year	Title	Role	Notes	Source
1988	Little Women	Tommy Brooke		
1995	Super Dimension Century Orguss 02	Ryan	As Jetta E. Bumpy	
1995	Armitage III	Kid	As Jetta E. Bumpy	
1995	Phantom Quest Corp.	Mamoru Shimesu	As Jetta E. Bumpy	
1997	Tokyo Revelation	Sinshiro Soma	As Ian Hawk	
1998	Bastard!!	Lushe	As Ian Hawk	
1998	Battle Athletes	Tanya Natdhipytadd	As Jetta Bird, OVA	
1999	Digimon Adventure	Koromon		
1999	Serial Experiments Lain	Taro	As Ian Hawk	
2000	Trigun	Tonis, Boy	As Ian Hawk	
2000	Dual! Parallel Trouble Adventure	Newscaster	As Ian Hawk	
2000	The Legend of Black Heaven	Gen Tanaka	As Ian Hawk	
2001	Arc the Lad	Young Elk	As Ian Hawk	
2001	Hand Maid May	Ikariya	As Ian Hawk	
2001	Cowboy Bebop	Various characters	As Ian Hawk	
2001	Gate Keepers	Hideki	As Ian Hawk	
2001	Outlaw Star	James "Jim" Hawking	As Ian Hawk, Grouped under English Voice Talent	
2001	Mobile Suit Gundam: The 08th MS Team	Boy	As Ian Hawk, OVA Ep. 8	
2001	Saint Tail	Ruby, Rina		
2001	Vampire Princess Miyu	Mayumi	Ep. 17	
2001	Digimon Tamers	Calumon		
2001	Mon Colle Knights	Rockna Hiiragi		
2002	Digimon Frontier	Tommy Himi/Kumamon/Korikakumon		
2002	Mobile Suit Gundam 0080: War in the Pocket	Al Izuruha	As Ian Hawk	
2002	Babel II: Beyond Infinity	Leon (child)	As Ian Hawk	
2002	X	Various characters	As Ian Hawk	
2002	Fushigi Yûgi Eikoden	Emperor Reizeitei, Boushin	As Ian Hawk	
2003	Wild Arms: Twilight Venom	Sheyenne Rainstorm	As Ian Hawk	
2003	A Little Snow Fairy Sugar	Salt	As Ian Hawk	
2003	.hack//Sign	Tsukasa, Elk		
2003	Samurai X	Yahiko Myojin	Sony dub, OAV series As Ian Hawk	
2003	Geneshaft	Remmy Levi-Strauss		
2003	Kikaider-01: The Animation	Akira		
2003	Daigunder	Jimmy		
2003	Dirty Pair: Affair on Nolandia	Misumi/Misuni, Connie Brighton	Streamline Pictures dub, As Ian Hawk	
2004	Wolf's Rain	Gehl		
2005	Saiyuki Reload	Kensei	As Ian Hawk	
2005	Fafner in the Azure	Island Core	As Ian Hawk	
2005	Zatch Bell!	Kido		
2005	Kyo Kara Maoh!	Little Shori		
2005	Mars Daybreak	Bon		
2005	IGPX: Immortal Grand Prix	Johnny Lipkin		
2005-2009	Naruto	Nawaki		
2006	Bleach	Horiuchi Hironari, Shū Kannogi		
2007	The Melancholy of Haruhi Suzumiya	Kunikida		
2007	Digimon Data Squad	Keenan Crier		
2008	Blue Dragon	Shu's Friend		
2008	Gurren Lagann	Gimmy	As Brianne Brozey	
2008	Ghost Slayers Ayashi	Soya Ryudo		
2009	Naruto: Shippuden	Nawaki		
2011	The Melancholy of Haruhi-chan Suzumiya	Kunikida	Ep. 7	
2011	Mix Master: Final Force	Tomo	As Murray Blue	
2012	Blue Exorcist	Nemu Takara, Yōhei, Takara's Puppet	Also in Kyoto Saga	
2013-15	Digimon Fusion	Ignitemon		
2014	Nura: Rise of the Yokai Clan: Demon Capital	Shokera		
2015	The Disappearance of Nagato Yuki-chan	Kunikida		
2018	Ai Tenchi Muyo!	Yuki Fuka	As Brianne Brozey, OVA	

=== Animation ===
List of voice performances in animation
Year	Title	Role	Notes	Source
1996-1997	Saban's Adventures of Oliver Twist	Artful Dodger		
1997	The New Batman Adventures	50's Robin	Episode: "Legends of the Dark Knight"	
2004	Zentrix	Nick	As Brianne Siddall	
2005	The Return of Dogtanian	Philippe		
2012–15	Rachel & the TreeSchoolers	Simon	As Brianne Siddall for Ep. 1, as Murray Blue for others	

=== Films ===
List of voice performances in direct-to-video and television films
Year	Title	Role	Notes	Source
1993	My Neighbor Totoro	Michiko	Streamline dub	
2000	Catnapped!	Toru	As Ian Hawk	
2000	Panda! Go, Panda!	Male student	As Ian Hawk	
2000	Dog of Flanders	Stephen		
2000	The Life & Adventures of Santa Claus	Ethan		
2001	Street Fighter Alpha	Little boy	As Ian Hawk	
2001	Ninku: The Movie	Boy	As Ian Hawk	
2001	YuYu Hakusho: The Movie	Koenma	Animaze dub As Ian Hawk	
2002	Metropolis	Kenichi		
2003	The Little Polar Bear	Robby		
2005	Digimon Tamers: Runaway Digimon Express	Calumon		
2005	Digimon Tamers: Battle of Adventurers	Calumon		
2005	Digimon Frontier: Island of Lost Digimon	Tommy		
2011	The Disappearance of Haruhi Suzumiya	Kunikida		
2012	A Turtle's Tale: Sammy's Adventures	ADR Loop Group		
2013	A Turtle's Tale 2: Sammy's Escape from Paradise	Loop Group		
2014	Jungle Shuffle	Young Manu		
2014	Thunder and the House of Magic	Thunder, Dylan	As Murray Blue	
2024	Digimon Adventure	Koromon		
2024	Digimon Adventure: Our War Game!	Kuramon, Little Girl 2D		

List of voice performances in feature films
Year	Title	Role	Notes	Source
1999	Tarzan	Young Tarzan yells		
2000	Digimon: The Movie	Koromon, Kuramon		

=== Live action ===
List of acting performances in film and television
Year	Title	Role	Notes	Source
1984	Shadows Run Black	Girl at Police Counter		
1987	Lust for Freedom	Prison inmate	Also Assistant editor	
1989	The Wizard of Speed and Time			

=== Video games ===
List of voice performances in video games
Year	Title	Role	Notes	Source
2001	JumpStart SpyMasters: Unmask the Prankster; JumpStart SpyMasters: Max Strikes Back	TJ Adams		
2001	Power Rangers Time Force	Circuit		
2002	JumpStart Advanced Preschool; JumpStart Advanced Kindergarten; JumpStart Advanced 1st Grade; JumpStart Advanced 2nd Grade	Hopsalot, Casey	Credited as Breanne Siddal	
2002	JumpStart Advanced 1st Grade	Squirt	Credited as Breanne Siddal	
2002	Digimon Rumble Arena	Calumon		
2003–04	.hack series	Elk, Tsukasa	Infection, Mutation, Outbreak, Quarantine	
2004	Seven Samurai 20XX	Al		
2004	Tales of Symphonia	Mithos	Also Chronicles	
2005	Xenosaga Episode II: Jenseits von Gut und Böse	Dr. Rubedo		
2006	Zatch Bell! Mamodo Fury	Kido		
2006	Zatch Bell! Mamodo Fury	Kido		
2006	Xenosaga Episode III: Also sprach Zarathustra	Jr.		
2007	Digimon World Data Squad	Keenan Crier		
