= Quest Atlantis =

Educational video game

Quest Atlantis (QA) was a 3D multiuser, computer graphics program that utilized a narrative programming toolkit to teach inquiry tasks. It was targeted toward children ages nine to sixteen. It allowed users to travel to virtual places to perform educational activities (Quests), talk with other users and mentors, and build virtual personae. The project was intended to engage children ages 9–16 in a form of transformational play comprising both online and offline learning activities.

The principal investigator was Sasha Barab, Associate Professor in Learning Sciences, now at Arizona State University. Other faculty members who played prominent roles in the project included Dan Hickey at Indiana University-Bloomington and Melissa Gresalfi at Vanderbilt University.

The game was redesigned in 2012 with the help of funding from the Bill and Melinda Gates Foundation and re-released as Atlantis Remixed.

== See also ==
- Active Worlds
- Simulated reality
