= JumpStart 1st Grade =

1995 video game

- CD cover art featuring the school mascot, Frankie
- Developer: Fanfare Software
- Publisher: Knowledge Adventure
- Producers: Barton Listick; Paul Stroube; Bernadette Gonzalez
- Designer: Barton Listick
- Programmers: Ken Coleman; Oliver Capio; Bill DuSha; Mark Dinan; LeVon Karayan
- Artists: Bonnie Bright; Pascal Baudar; Jeanne Brinker; Todd Hoff; Adrienne Medrano; Jennifer Terry
- Composers: Voyetra Technologies; Mark Beckwith; Bob Selvin
- Series: JumpStart
- Platforms: Windows, Macintosh
- Release: July 1995
- Genre: Educational
- Mode: Single-player

JumpStart 1st Grade is an educational video game developed by Fanfare Software and published by Knowledge Adventure in 1995. Aimed at children entering or in the first grade, the software provides the player educational activities set in an elementary school. The activities include interactive story books, art activities, and games that span eighteen subject areas, such as geography, arithmetic, and spelling.

The game is the second entry in the JumpStart series. Fanfare created the series as an educational supplement for parents and teachers. The developer based the activities on the curricula of several states in the United States and consulted first grade teachers during development. Promotion was handled by Knowledge Adventure. The company released an updated version, which is known by the same name as well as JumpStart 1st Grade 2000, in 1999. A two-disc set named JumpStart 1st Grade Deluxe followed in 2001. The original version was localized to the United Kingdom as Jump Ahead Year 1 in 1997.

JumpStart 1st Grade was well received by computing publications. Praise focused on the engagement of children. However, a common counterpoint was that young children needed assistance to take full advantage of the lessons. It won a CODiE Award for "Best Home Learning Program for Children" in 1996 and frequently appeared in top fifteen sales charts of educational software from 1996 to 2000. Knowledge Adventure followed JumpStart 1st Grade with spin-off games in specific subjects and books.

== Gameplay ==
The player visits different areas of the school, including the cafeteria where they must follow directions to serve lunch while learning fractions. Frankie (top right corner), the school mascot, appears throughout the game to assist.

JumpStart 1st Grade is an edutainment software aimed at five to seven-year-old children entering or in the first grade. Set in an elementary school, the player visits school-related spaces to complete educational activities. The characters learn in a classroom, ride a school bus for field trips, and eat lunch in a cafeteria. Interactive books, art activities, and games are available in the classroom, which is led by Mrs. Flores, the room's teacher. The player can enter a hallway to visit other areas of the school, such as the playground or cafeteria, to access additional activities. The school's mascot, Frankie the Dog, assists with activities.

The program focuses on eighteen areas of study, including geography, life sciences, arithmetic, spelling, and reading comprehension. The activities are short games intended to teach the player first grade-skills, such as reading, writing, simple fractions, following instructions, and creative expression. For example, a game in the cafeteria requires the player to serve food to students on plates that are divided into factions, and a vending machine on campus requires the player to make correct change.

The player can select from three levels of play. The software will also adapt the difficulty based on the user's progress. Progress is tracked through milk caps that are collected by completing games. At the playground, the milk caps can be used to access multiple-choice quizzes. Parents and teachers can also access a more in-depth report about player progress.

== Development ==
JumpStart 1st Grade was developed by Fanfare Software and published by Knowledge Adventure. Barton Listick, who founded Fanfare Software, produced the software along with Paul Stroube and Bernadette Gonzalez. Ken Coleman oversaw the software engineering, which included a team of four programmers. Bonnie Bright created the backgrounds and worked with Tom Bernardo on the animations. David Atherton directed the audio, which consisted of music, voice work, and sound effects. Bob Selvin arranged the music whereas Mark Beckwith wrote original music for the game and the MIDI music was done by Voyetra Technologies. Tony Pope and Glynnis Campbell provided character voices. Mark Beckwith, Graham Beckwith, Mark Towner, and Glynnis Campbell narrated the stories.

The software is the second release in the company's line of JumpStart edutainment games, which are grade level curriculum-based programs aimed at young children. Listick conceived the series' concept with his wife, Karen Listick, who is a teacher. They aimed to provide parents and teachers a tool that could be used at home and school, respectively, to help students get "up to speed". Karen Listick served as an educational consultant on JumpStart 1st Grade. The game's activities were based on the curricula of several states in the United States, such as New York, Texas, and California. Additionally, Fanfare consulted an advisory panel of six first grade teachers during development.

== Marketing and release ==
Knowledge Adventure promoted its JumpStart series at the 1995 winter Consumer Electronics Show in January. The company announced JumpStart 1st Grade on May 11, 1995. As part of the software's promotion, JumpStart: Sampler was included on the packaged CD-ROM of the October 1995 issue of CD-ROM Today. The demo consists of tours of Knowledge Adventure's early grade level software, including 1st Grade. When publishing the game, the company packaged the CD-ROM in a 5.75 in × 8.5 in box by Compton's NewMedia, which had become the industry standard at the time.

CUC Software, Knowledge Adventure's parent company, made JumpStart 1st Grade and its other education programs available for schools and school districts to purchase via building site and district licenses. In 1997, CUC Software expanded its license program to include a "School-to-Home" license that allowed teachers and students to use the school software programs on home computers. That same year, it was released in the United Kingdom as Jump Ahead Year 1. This version was based on Great Britain's curriculum for primary students.

In 1999, Knowledge Adventure released an updated version under the same name; however, the program was referred to as JumpStart 1st Grade 2000 after installation on the computer. The update includes a resource center to monitor individual progress, a printed teacher's guide, and new educational activities based on national curriculum standards. The company released a two-disc version named JumpStart 1st Grade Deluxe two years later.

== Reception ==
=== Sales ===
JumpStart 1st Grade frequently appeared in top sales charts following publication. MultiMedia Merchandising reported that the Windows version was the eleventh best selling children's and family software between July 12 – August 10 in 1996, based on industry surveys and retail reports. According to NDP Group, it was the second top-selling education software in August 1998. JumpStart 1st Grade dropped to fifth the next month and then to seventh in October. By November it dropped to thirteenth but rebounded to twelfth in the December sales unit rankings.

In identifying trends in educational technology, Michael Kalinowski, a professor of family studies, noted that the game was among the top ten best-selling home education software in 1999. PC Data reported that JumpStart 1st Grade was the third top home education title during the week February 28–March 6, 1999, as well as the whole month of March. Soon after, the software dropped to fifth on PC Data's list of Top-Selling Home Education Software for the week of April 4–10, based on units sold in thirteen retail chains in the United States. However, JumpStart 1st Grade was the sixth best-selling title in home education overall for April. The next month, it rose to the second rank. Additionally, the game topped PC Data's home education chart during the week of May 16–22. JumpStart 1st Grade repeated the accomplishment again the week of July 4–10. The next week, its ranking dropped to number two. By the last week of July, the software dipped another ranking.

JumpStart 1st Grade returned to the number two position mid-August, the week of August 15–21, and held there an additional two weeks. For the weeks of September 19–25 and October 3–9, it remained the second best-selling home education software. By the week of December 5–11, the game was ranked fifth. The software's sales ranking started the following year strong and then dropped after a few months. The week of January 23–29, 2000, PC Data reported that JumpStart 1st Grade was the best-selling title in the PC home education category. NDP Group reported that it was the eleventh best-selling edutainment software during the first week of April 2000, April 2–8, and then fourteenth the next week. Overall, JumpStart 1st Grade was fourth on PC Data's list of best-selling education PC titles during the first half of 2000, selling 118,711 units.

=== Critical response ===
Reception

Review scores
Publication	Score
AllGame	3.5/5
Macworld	3.5/5
HomePC	4/4
MacUser	4.5/5

Award
Publication	Award
Software Publishers Association	Best Home Learning Program for Children (1996)

JumpStart 1st Grade received an overall positive reception. Writing for Computer Game Review, Steven Greenlee praised the software, describing it as "well-conceived and well-initiated" for its age group. A reviewer from Superkids recommended the game for younger players and rated it high in its three categories: educational value, kid appeal, and ease of use. They wrote that children would not become bored from the repetitive tasks and activities. MacUser's writers, Rik Myslewski and Jim Shatz-Akin stated that the game will "engage even the most jaded first-grader." They praised the milk-caps as motivating and the songs and animations as entertaining. Ric Moxley of All Game Guide complimented several aspects of the game, overall calling it "a winner in the edutainment department." Heidi Aycock of PC Gamer praised JumpStart 1st Grade's presentation, calling the interface "clever" and the graphics "beautiful". She drew attention to the multicultural cast of characters in the game and within its stories, which she described as a harmonious mix of cultures that set a "fine example".

Multiple reviewers felt the software did a good job engaging young children and introducing them to good concepts. However, they noted that children would be unlikely to reap the full benefits without someone older present to help guide them. HomePC's editors observed children using the software and noted their excitement and positive engagement. While they described the learning as "loads of fun", the editors pointed out that younger children may need assistance on portions that are too challenging for them. Moxely praised the activities for being captivating to children, describing them as "mind-stimulating", "colorful", and "animated". While he acknowledged they are not a substitute for standard curriculum, Moxley considered the games a good support tool when a parent is present for guidance. He noted that unsupervised children would be likely to miss areas of the software and successfully complete tasks by randomly clicking.

Commentators attributed the need for assistance to some activities being too challenging for younger children. While she felt the software had widespread educational benefit and entertainment, Aycock advised parents to assess when to introduce it to their children due to the difference in grade levels the concepts are introduced across states. Writing for Macworld, Franklin Tessler recommended the software as a good back-to-school purchase. He wrote that first graders will love the program and enjoy the lessons; however, he noted that some activities may be too difficult for five and six year olds. Moxely and the HomePC editors echoed similar statements.

The software garnered awards and distinctions. The staff of CD-ROM Today named JumpStart 1st Grade the runner up for the "Best Early Reading Title" in their 1995 Rommie Awards, stating that it does an "excellent job" of preparing children for first grade. The editors of HomePC magazine named it one of the best software titles of 1995 in their holiday shopping guide. The Software Publishers Association bestowed JumpStart 1st Grade the "Best Home Learning Program for Children" in its 1996 CODiE Awards.

== Analysis ==
Academic journals have analyzed JumpStart 1st Grade's presentation and effectiveness. In study of gender representation in top-rated and best-selling language arts software for children in 1998, Deanne Drees and Dr. Gary Phye identified JumpStart 1st Grade as a best-selling software but not a top-rated ASCD one. They observed that its breakdown of character genders (58% boys and 42% girls) was consistent with the overall percentages of the best-selling software at the time (58% males and 42% females of all characters present). The study authors observed that despite improvement of gender role portrayals from 1996, the trend in 1998 indicated a difference between how purchasers and education industry reviewers regarded gender portrayal.

While examining the cultural politics of edutainment in 2006, Dr. Mizuko Ito noted that the games in the JumpStart series followed the edutainment industry format of embedding academic problems in an adventure game, which proved successful for developers. She examined an advertisement for the software from 2000, (Note: The advertisement appeared in the December 2000 issue of FamilyPC.) which included several titles in the series but focused on 1st Grade. While describing the ad's setting and character design, Ito wrote that it indirectly portrayed the young girl as part of a "white, suburban, conservative, and middle class" family. She stated the promotion draws an "unambiguous relation between the products and academic achievement" and implies it will address "inequities that have plagued girls in academic achievement."

In 2010, Dr. Lana Santoro and Dr. M.J. Bishop included JumpStart 1st Grade in their study evaluating ASCD's top recommended beginning reading software for children in 2000. Using the Likert scale, they scored it highest in affordability (4.17/5) and aesthetics (4.60/5) while scoring relatively neutral in areas of learner support (3.2/5) and overall instructional design (2.92/5). However, Santoro and Bishop rated the software the lowest (1/5) in several areas of phonological awareness (such as, sound level, sentence level, and syllable level) and alphabetic understanding (such as, blending and segmenting). While its total score (Note: Santoro and Bishop determined total scores by adding the mean scores within the four criterion categories: interface design, instructional design, phonological awareness, and alphabetic understanding.) was among the top five of those evaluated, the two determined that rankings based on total score would be "fairly meaningless" due to differing correlations between various indicators. For example, instructional design and content showed a strong positive correlation whereas interface design and content had a strong negative correlation.

== Legacy ==
Knowledge Adventure released a third JumpStart game—JumpStart Preschool—soon after. The company acquired Fanfare Software as an internal developer in August 1995. Barton Listick, Fanfare's founder, became the vice-president of Knowledge Adventure, and Fanfare staff relocated to Knowledge Adventure's headquarters in Glendale, California. Near the end of 1997, it produced subject-specific versions for reading and mathematics. The reading version, JumpStart 1st Grade Reading, has a circus theme and focuses on comprehension, spelling, and other reading fundamentals. The math version, JumpStart 1st Grade Math, tasks the player with solving arithmetic, completing sequences, estimating, and exercising other basic math principles in order to save Frankie who has been shrunk. In 2000, the company partnered with Scholastic to publish books related to JumpStart 1st Grade under its JumpStart Readers series. The books feature Frankie along with other JumpStart characters. Two years later, Knowledge Adventure relaunched the game series as JumpStart Advanced, which included an updated first grade version, JumpStart Advanced 1st Grade.
