= JumpStart Adventures 4th Grade: Haunted Island =

1996 video game

- The user's guide for the 1998 re-release of JumpStart Adventures 4th Grade: Haunted Island.
- Developers: Knowledge Adventure; KnowWare
- Publisher: Knowledge Adventure
- Series: JumpStart
- Platforms: Windows, Macintosh
- Release: December 9, 1996
- Genre: Educational/adventure
- Modes: Single-player, 1st person, sandbox

JumpStart Adventures 4th Grade: Haunted Island is a personal computer game in Knowledge Adventure's JumpStart series of educational software intended to teach a fourth grade curriculum. The game was released on December 2, 1996.

In November 1997 and in August 1998, revised versions of the game were published. Although little was changed in terms of gameplay, an in-game map was added, and the difficulty select was given an icon. In 1999, the game was retired and replaced by JumpStart Adventures 4th Grade: Sapphire Falls.

== Gameplay ==
During the game, the player is given missions by Madame Pomreeda. These missions require the player to complete three games to find a student's favorite things. Once the player has completed four missions, the character will be returned to normal, and the player will move on to another student. The game keeps track of a player's successes and failures, and a poor performance in one minigame will lead to it appearing more often.

The player also must collect all 25 keys in order to reach the attic, where the kids are being held. These are collected by earning 5000 points in one particular minigame.

The protagonist has a limited amount of "health", which is indicated by a candle in the upper left hand corner of the screen. Health is depleted through answering Repsac's questions incorrectly and is indicated by the candle burning down. If the candle burns out, the protagonist is cast into the island's labyrinth, which contains a "fountain of health" that will cause the candle to reburn and, eventually, grow back to its original size, but finding one's way out of the labyrinth is difficult.

== Plot ==
The protagonist is a 4th Grade student who missed the day of school when the class's new substitute teacher was a witch named Ms. Grunkle.

After signing in at the schoolhouse, the protagonist is transported to Haunted Island off the Coast of West Africa. With the aid of a large purple bat named Flap and a fortune teller named Madame Pomreeda, the protagonist must rescue the 13 lost classmates by collecting the students' "most prized possessions" from the island's educational activities. After these possessions (which reveal elements of the kid's personality) are collected, Madame Pomreeda transforms the classmate back with a chanting poem that dispels the monster and restores the child to normal.

Earning five thousand points will earn the protagonist one of the keys to Ms. Grunkle's house. 5 keys unlock one door and lead the protagonist into a new room. Whenever a room is entered for the first time, Ms. Grunkle appears and curses the protagonist into the labyrinth. Once the protagonist advances all the way through her house and makes it into her attic, where the rest of the class is locked up, the game is completed; but if some of the kids are still monsters when the protagonist reaches that attic, Flap informs the protagonist they will have to be changed back before the attic can be entered. It is almost impossible to not have all the keys by the time all the children have been changed back since merely playing the games that will save the kids provide all the points needed, but the players can achieve this by playing the games at only low levels and keep getting all the answers right to do this.

Once all the protagonist's classmates have been returned to normal and all the keys have been acquired, the protagonist enters the top floor and confronts Mrs. Grunkle who reveals the seeming succession of her plan. Now having the entire class before her, she intends to turn them (including the protagonist) into monsters (this time, presumed to be permanent). However, before the witch can unleash her magic, the protagonist repels her with her own wand (which fell out when she arrived on the island). Realizing she's been beaten, she flees on her broomstick. The children all cheer at their regained freedom before they and the protagonist discover a paper that fell to the floor upon Ms. Grunkle's departure, said paper shows their school returning to normal like them before they and the protagonist are magically transported back there.

== Reception ==
Reception

Review scores
Publication	Score
AllGame	4/5
MacHome	3.5/5

Lisa Karen Savignano, writing for AllGame, thought the work was "a fun game that teaches kids an entire year of fourth grade curriculum in one game."
