= JumpStart 2nd Grade =

1996 video game

- The 2000 cover of JumpStart 2nd Grade (1996 version)
- Developer: Knowledge Adventure
- Publisher: Knowledge Adventure
- Composers: Hamilton Alstatt; Mark Beckwith
- Series: JumpStart
- Platforms: Windows, Macintosh
- Release: 1996
- Genre: Educational
- Mode: Single-player

JumpStart 2nd Grade (known as Jump Ahead Year 2 in the United Kingdom) is a video game released on 26 March 1996 by Knowledge Adventure. As its name suggests, it was made to teach second grade students. It was replaced by JumpStart Advanced 2nd Grade in 2002.

== Gameplay and plot ==
Like the previous JumpStart products, the game takes place in a school setting, but begins after school hours when a giant anthropomorphic frog named C.J. enters the classroom and frees a firefly named Edison (Newton in the United Kingdom). C.J. and Edison form a double act of sorts with C.J. being an ardent, self-styled "adventurer" while Edison is the more pragmatic straight man, who frequently makes sardonic comments in response to C.J.'s grandiosity. The duo have appeared in many other JumpStart products, such as JumpStart Advanced 2nd Grade, but their looks and personalities have both undergone enormous changes throughout the years. Edison in the US version has an Irish accent, whereas Newton in the UK version does not.

== Development ==
The game was announced as being part of the JumpStart Grade School entertainment system in January 1997. The working title for the game was "JumpStart Adventures 2nd Grade".

== Reception ==
Reception

Review score
Publication	Score
MacUser	5/5

MacUser named JumpStart 2nd Grade one of 1996's top 50 CD-ROMs.
