= JumpStart Adventures 4th Grade: Sapphire Falls =

1999 video game

- Developers: Knowledge Adventure; Humancode
- Publisher: Knowledge Adventure
- Series: JumpStart
- Platforms: Windows, Macintosh
- Release: December 3, 1999
- Genre: Educational/adventure
- Mode: Single-player

JumpStart Adventures 4th Grade: Sapphire Falls is a personal computer game released by Knowledge Adventure on December 3, 1999 to replace their earlier JumpStart Adventures 4th Grade: Haunted Island released in 1996, after the Haunted Island game was deemed too scary for its target demographic.

== Gameplay and plot ==
In the game, a hairy, bipedal creature invades an old, abandoned mine in the town of Sapphire Falls. Scaring away tourists, the creature succeeds in stealing a mysterious treasure map that no one has ever been able to read. Two aspiring fourth-grade reporters named Sally and T.J. along with their pint-sized dog Gizmo travel to the mine to solve the mystery.
