= IParenting Media =

Media company

iParenting Media was a company and then a unit of Disney Online that operated web sites, provided apps, and gave widely recognized prizes for content related to children and parenting. It was a separate company prior to the Disney acquisition. The company was started in January 1997 by Elisa Ast All and Alvin All and was sold in December 2007. The former was pregnant at the time of founding.

== Sites ==
- PregnancyToday.com
- Preconception.com
- Cycle Daily
- Celebrity Parents
- Pregnancy Today
- Pregnancy Daily
- Birth Plan
- Birthstories
- Babies Today
- Baby Daily
- Breastfeed.com
- Toddlers Today
- Preschoolers Today
- Children Today
- Preteenagers Today
- Teenagers Today
- Dads Today
- Moms Today
- Grandparents Today
- Recipes Today
- Home Style Today
- Traveling Today
- Twins Today
- Special Kids Today
- iParenting Adoption
- iParenting Stories

== Content ==
iParenting Media produced podcasts from 2006 to 2009.

== Awards ==
iParenting Media Awards have been granted in these categories

- Accessories
- Audio
- Baby Care
- Bedding
- Book
- Clothing
- Cribs
- Feature Film
- Feeding
- Food
- Gear and Equipment
- Gifts
- Home Video/DVD
- Housewares
- Just for Dad
- Just for Mom
- Magazines
- Safety
- Software
- Sporting Goods
- Storyteller
- Television
- Toys & Games
- Video Game
- Websites
