= JumpStart Adventures 3rd Grade: Mystery Mountain =

1996 video game

- The current (2007) cover of JumpStart Advanced 3rd Grade
- Developer: Knowledge Adventure
- Publisher: Knowledge Adventure
- Producer: David Fratto
- Designers: David Fratto; Bernadette Gonzalez; Barton Listick; Rob Wrubel
- Programmer: Miguel Canales
- Artist: Bonnie Williams
- Writers: Doria Briddle; Robert Nashak; David Fratto
- Composers: HaleSong Music Productions; Randy Hale
- Series: JumpStart
- Platforms: Windows, Macintosh
- Release: December 2, 1996
- Genre: Educational/adventure
- Mode: Single-player

JumpStart Adventures 3rd Grade: Mystery Mountain is a personal computer game in Knowledge Adventure's JumpStart series of educational software. As the title suggests, the game is intended to teach a third grade curriculum. This is the only version of this game created and, unusually for Knowledge Adventure, was still being sold over fifteen years after its initial release on December 2, 1996. In June 2003, it was included as the "Fundamentals" disc of JumpStart Advanced 3rd Grade.

== Plot ==
Set in a retro-futuristic universe, the game concerns Polly Spark, the bratty daughter of a wealthy inventor, and her attempt to alter history so that her inane answers to a history quiz she failed will be correct. To do this, she sends 25 reprogrammed robots back in time and, with her father conveniently away on a business trip, she takes over Mystery Mountain, the literal "mountain mansion" where she and her father live. The goal of the game is to help Botley, the robot assigned to keep Polly under control, save the world by retrieving each of the 25 robots and bringing them back to the present.

== Gameplay ==
Each of the game's 25 missions (one for each robot that must be rescued) begins with the user selecting one of Polly's questions from the TransQuizzer. On the TransQuizzer, Polly's teacher Ms. Winkle poses a historical question, and Polly gives a surreally humorous answer. Polly then appears on a monitor to state which robot she has sent back in time for the question and to list the four Mission Clues that need to be found for the mission.

Botley, using his powerful sensory device, then determines which games need to be played in order to retrieve the needed Mission Clues. Once all the Mission Clues have been collected, the user will still need to collect an increasing number of Invention Points in order to be allowed to enter the Time Machine Mission Control. The number of Invention Points required to enter the Time Machine gradually increases over time.

Once inside the Time Machine Mission Control, the user has to get past the Wheel of Invention in order to acquire a Time Key and enter the Time Machine itself, though Polly has apparently reprogrammed the Wheel so it's not just a quiz, but rather a quiz show called "Pollywood Squares". Here, Monty Monitor quizzes the user with questions that provide the point in time where Polly has sent the missing robot and which eventually reveal the correct answer to Polly's original test question.

After this activity is completed, the user enters the Time Machine and travels back in time to retrieve the robot and bring it back to the present, where the rescued robots are deposited in an area called the "robot roost". After the robot has been rescued, the user begins a new mission by selecting another question from the TransQuizzer, but if the user doesn't start the mission to play all the games to win more Invention Points, Botley mentions that Polly will win. The game continues in this manner until all 25 robots are returned to the present.

== Reception ==
In 1997, BusinessWeek rated Jumpstart Third Grade: Mystery Mountain as one of several "programs that don't bore", describing it as "Not strictly a math program, but logic and listening get a good workout."
