= JumpStart Kindergarten =

1994 video game

- 1994 CD cover
- Developer: Fanfare Software
- Publisher: Knowledge Adventure
- Producer: Barton Listick
- Designer: Barton Listick
- Artist: Bonnie Bright
- Series: JumpStart
- Platforms: MS-DOS, Windows, Macintosh
- Release: 14 November 1994 (MS-DOS/Win 3.x); 28 August 1995 (Win/Mac); 24 November 1997 (Win/Mac re-release)
- Genre: Educational
- Mode: Single-player

JumpStart Kindergarten (known as Jump Ahead Starting School in the UK) is an educational video game developed by Fanfare Software and released by Knowledge Adventure on the MS-DOS platform in 1994 (v1.0). It was the first product released in the JumpStart series and, as its name suggests, it is intended to teach kindergarten students. According to the Knowledge Adventure founder Bill Gross, it is the first educational software program that covers the entire kindergarten curriculum. It was ported to the Windows and Macintosh systems in 1995 (v1.2). It was updated with a new version in November 1997 (v2.0), and later with additional content in a 2-CD Deluxe version in 2000 (v2.6), that included JumpStart Around the World. Eventually it was replaced in 2002 by JumpStart Advanced Kindergarten.

This game was adapted to VHS in 1999 as JumpStart Kindergarten: Why Did the Bus Stop?.

== Gameplay ==
The game takes place in a kindergarten schoolhouse. The game is hosted by the teacher, an anthropomorphic gray bunny named Mr. Hopsalot. The specifics of the game vary from the two versions, but in both the user may access educational activities and simple games by clicking on objects. In the early version, all of the activities are accessible from a single screen inside the classroom. In the re-release, different areas of the classroom and the nearby areas outside containing activities may be explored and as a new addition playing activities earns the player stars.

== Educational goals ==
During computer learning, the game teaches children basic pre-reading, vocabulary and math, plus songs five for entertainment. It introduces and reinforces lesson related to the Kindergarten curriculum and parents are able to check their children's progress report via a comprehensive Progress Report.

== Reception ==
CNET called JumpStart Kindergarten a great way to reinforce what's learned in the classroom.

JumpStart Kindergarten ranked 10th on PC Data's list of Top-Selling Home Education Software for the week of April 4 to 10 in 1999.
