= JumpStart Games =

American educational software developer

JumpStart Games, Inc.
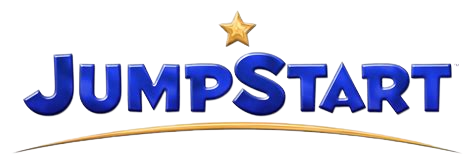
- Formerly: Knowledge Adventure, Inc. (1991–2012)
- Type: Subsidiary
- Industry: Video games Education
- Predecessor: Davidson & Associates; CUC Software; Cendant Software; Havas
- Founded: 1991; 35 years ago
- Defunct: July 1, 2023; 3 years ago
- Headquarters: Torrance, California, United States
- Products: Neopets; JumpStart (Knowledge Adventure); Blaster Learning System (Davidson & Associates)
- Number of employees: 201–500
- Parent: Vivendi Universal Games (1997–2004); NetDragon Websoft (2017–2023)

JumpStart Games, Inc., formerly Knowledge Adventure, Inc., was an American edutainment video game company, that is based in Torrance, California. Founded in 1991, it was acquired by Chinese holding company NetDragon Websoft in 2017.

== History ==
Former logo as Knowledge Adventure, used from 1993 until 1998 (the animated version used from 1994 until 1998)

From 1991 to 1997, Knowledge Adventure developed games for IBM PC compatibles running MS-DOS.

=== Purchase by CUC International ===
On November 5, 1996, CUC International announced that it would acquire Knowledge Adventure; the acquisition was completed on January 31, 1997 with a press release on February 3, 1997. In February 1996, CUC had acquired Davidson & Associates; this subsidiary was later merged with Knowledge Adventure in October 1998.

Former logo as Knowledge Adventure, used from 1998 until 2011

On May 28, 1997, CUC International announced plans to merge with Hospitality Franchise Systems to create a single, "one-stop" entity. The merger was finalized in December that year and created Cendant. As a result of the merger, CUC Software was renamed Cendant Software. On November 20, 1998, French media company Havas (later acquired by water utility Vivendi) announced that it would acquire Cendant Software for $800 million in cash and up to $200 million contingent on the performance of Cendant Software. Subsequently, the division was renamed Havas Interactive.

During that time, Knowledge Adventure released many branded games such as JumpStart, Dr. Brain, Fisher-Price, Barbie, Bear in the Big Blue House, Blaster, Franklin (TV series),Teletubbies, Noddy, Jurassic Park III, Captain Kangaroo, Curious George and American Idol. The Cendant Software/Knowledge Adventure family of products had the #1 Educational Software market share according to PC DATA during 1998.

=== Separation from Vivendi ===
In October 2004, Vivendi sold Knowledge Adventure to a group of investors interested in taking a more active management strategy, and in developing new educational software. The company released new products under both the JumpStart and Math Blaster brands.

Last logo as Knowledge Adventure, used from 2011 until 2012

In October 2012, Knowledge Adventure changed its name to JumpStart Games.

On March 17, 2014, JumpStart Games purchased Neopets from Viacom.

On July 7, 2017, JumpStart Games was acquired by Chinese online game publisher NetDragon Websoft.

=== Back-catalog digital re-releases ===
On November 25, 2014, five Knowledge Adventure titles were re-released digitally as DRM-Free exclusives on ZOOM-Platform.com through a partnership between JumpStart Games and the Jordan Freeman Group. The five titles included 3D Body Adventure, 3D Dinosaur Adventure, Dinosaur Adventure (Original), Space Adventure, and Undersea Adventure.

On March 6, 2015, another Knowledge Adventure title, Bug Adventure, was re-released digitally as a DRM-Free exclusive on ZOOM-Platform.com. This title was also released through the partnership between JumpStart and the Jordan Freeman Group. ZOOM-Platform.com indicated the game was released due to the "incredible reaction" they got to the first batch of Knowledge Adventure titles.

=== Closure and transfer of Neopets ===
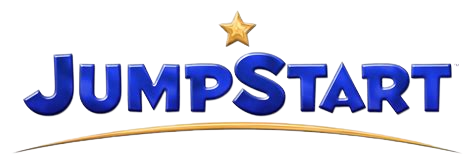
Logo for JumpStart Games from 2012 until 2023

On June 13, 2023, Jumpstart Games announced it was ceasing all of its operations and ending support of all games, excluding Neopets, on June 30, 2023. The company officially closed July 1, 2023 at 3am EST with servers and their website also shutting down. No reason upon the closure was given.

Neopets was briefly transferred over to Fluffy Dog Studios, which was formerly JumpStart Vancouver, but then was spun off as World of Neopia, Inc. in a management buyout deal.
