= List of educational video games =

This is a list of notable educational video games.

There is some overlap between educational games and interactive CD-ROMs and other programs (based on player agency), and between educational games and related genres like simulations and interactive storybooks (based on how much gameplay is devoted to education). This list aims to list games which have been marketed as educational.

Often, educational video game properties become part of larger franchises, for example Carmen Sandiego, Oregon Trail, and Math Blaster.

== Educational games for children and adolescents ==
Title	Developer	Subject	Franchise	Year
A to Zap! Featuring the Sunbuddies	ImageBuilder Software		N/A	1995
Animal Jam	WildWorks		N/A	2010
Basic Math	Atari	Arithmetic	N/A	1977
Big Brain Academy: Wii Degree	Nintendo EAD Group No. 4		Big Brain Academy	2007
Big Brain Academy	Nintendo EAD Group No. 4		Big Brain Academy	2005
Where in the World Is Carmen Sandiego?	Broderbund	Geography (World)	Carmen Sandiego	1985
Where in the U.S.A. Is Carmen Sandiego?	Broderbund	Geography (USA)	Carmen Sandiego	1986
Where in Europe Is Carmen Sandiego?	Broderbund	Geography (Europe)	Carmen Sandiego	1988
Where in Time Is Carmen Sandiego?	Broderbund	History	Carmen Sandiego	1989
Carmen Sandiego's Great Chase Through Time	Broderbund	History	Carmen Sandiego	1997
Carmen Sandiego Word Detective	Broderbund	Language	Carmen Sandiego	1997
Carmen Sandiego Math Detective	Broderbund	Mathematics	Carmen Sandiego	1998
Chill Manor	Animation Magic		I.M. Meen	1996
The ClueFinders	The Learning Company	Common Core	The ClueFinders	1998-2002
Dr. Brain	Sierra On-Line and Knowledge Adventure		Dr. Brain	1992-1999
Brain Age	Nintendo SPD and Nintendo EPD		Brain Age	2005-2020
Bug Adventure	Knowledge Adventure	Animals (Bugs)	N/A	1994
Dread Dragon Droom	Humberside		N/A	1985
EcoQuest	Sierra On-Line		Sierra Discovery Series	1991 and 1993
GCompris (GPL)	Bruno Coudoin		N/A	2000
Genomics Digital Lab	Spongelab Interactive		N/A	2009
Get Water!	Decode Global Studio		N/A	2013
Gimkit	Joshua Feinsilber		N/A	2017
Gizmos & Gadgets!	The Learning Company	Science	Super Solvers/Super Seekers	1993
Gus Goes to Cybertown	Modern Media Ventures		Gus Goes to...	1993
History of Biology	Spongelab Interactive	Biology	N/A	2010
Immune Attack	Federation of American Scientists, Escape Hatch Entertainment		N/A	2008
Immune Defense	Molecular Jig Games	Biology	N/A	2015
Inanimate Alice	Kate Pullinger		N/A	2005
InLiving	Creative North Studios, Kirklees Neighbourhood Housing		N/A	2008
I.M. Meen	Animation Magic		I.M. Meen	1995
JumpStart Kindergarten	Fanfare Software, JumpStart Games		JumpStart	1994
Lola Panda	BeiZ Ltd.		Lola Panda	2012-2014
Math Blaster!	Davidson & Associates	Mathematics	Blaster Learning System	1983
Math for the Real World	Davidson and Associates	Mathematics	N/A	1997
Meister Cody	Kaasa health	CODY Assessment	N/A	2013
Number Munchers	Minnesota Educational Computing Consortium	Mathematics	Munchers	1986
The Oregon Trail	Don Rawitsch, Bill Heinemann, and Paul Dillenberger	History	The Oregon Trail	1971
PlaceSpotting		Geography	Based on Google Maps	2007
Pax Warrior	23 YYZee	Rwandan genocide	N/A	
Quest Atlantis			N/A	
Quest for the Code	Starbright	Asthma	N/A	2002
Reader Rabbit	The Learning Company	Language	Reader Rabbit	1983
The Magic School Bus	Microsoft	Common Core	The Magic School Bus	1994-2000
Treasure Mountain!	The Learning Company		Super Solvers/Super Seekers	1990
Tuxmath (GPL)	Bill Kendrick et al.	Mathematics		
Mathletics		Mathematics	N/A	2005
Storybook Weaver	MECC	Storybook creation	N/A	1994
Swamp Gas Visits the United States of America	Inline Design	Geography (USA)	N/A	1990
Time Riders in American History	The Learning Company	History (USA)	N/A	1992
WolfQuest	Minnesota Zoo, Eduweb	Animals (Wolves)	N/A	2007
Woogi World	Children's Way		N/A	2008
Logical Journey of the Zoombinis	Broderbund	Logic	Zoombinis	1996

== Educational games for adults ==
Title	Developer	Subject	Franchise	Year
Catch the Sperm	Phenomedia AG CH	Sexual education	Catch the Sperm	2001
CyberCIEGE	Naval Postgraduate School and Rivermind, Inc.	Network security	N/A	2004
Democracy	Positech Games	Political simulation	Democracy	2005
Food Force	United Nations World Food Programme	Famine	Food Force	2005
Global Conflict: Palestine	Serious Games Interactive	Israeli–Palestinian conflict	Global Conflicts	2007
Hegemony Gold: Wars of Ancient Greece	Longbow Games	Ancient Greek warfare	Hegemony	2010
Mavis Beacon Teaches Typing	The Software Toolworks	Touch typing	Mavis Beacon Teaches Typing	1987
Miniconomy	Wouter Leenards	Economics education	N/A	2002
President Forever 2008 + Primaries	TheorySpark	Political simulation	President Forever	2006
The Typing of the Dead	WOW Entertainment and Smilebit	English language-learning	The House of the Dead	1999
TerraGenesis	Edgeworks Entertainment	Planetary science & environmental engineering	TerraGenesis	1999
