= Reading Blaster 2000 =

1996 video game

- CD cover art
- Developer: Davidson & Associates
- Publishers: Davidson & Associates (1996 - 1999); Knowledge Adventure (1998 - present)
- Series: Blaster Learning System
- Platforms: Windows, Macintosh
- Release: 1996
- Genre: Educational
- Modes: Single-player, multiplayer

Reading Blaster 2000 is an edutainment computer game in the Blaster Learning System series released by Davidson & Associates in 1996, and is a follow-up to the 1994 title Reading Blaster: Invasion of the Word Snatchers. After the series development moved to Knowledge Adventure, Reading Blaster 2000 was rebranded as Reading Blaster: Ages 6–9 in 1998 and as Reading Blaster for 3rd Grade in 2000.

== Storyline ==
The game features a premise involving the characters depicted in previous Blaster products (Blasternaut, Galactic Commander, and Spot) competing in a game show set in outer space called "The Challenge of the Reading Gladiators". The user chooses which Blaster character to play and may either compete against a friend who plays as another Blaster character, or against the computer.

When playing against the computer, the player's opponent is Illitera, the main villain of the original Reading Blaster. Illitera is the only recurring villain in the Blaster games, although here she does nothing worse than bad-mouthing the show's hosts and eliciting boos from the unseen audience.

== Gameplay ==
Reading Blaster 2000 is one of the few multiplayer video games in the Blaster series.

== See also ==
- Math Blaster Episode I: In Search of Spot
- Math Blaster Episode II: Secret of the Lost City
