= Math Blaster Jr. =

1996 video game

- "Math Blaster Jr." cover art
- Developer(s): Davidson & Associates
- Publisher(s): Davidson & Associates
- Series: Blaster Learning System
- Platform(s): Windows, Macintosh
- Release: 1996
- Genre(s): Educational (mathematics)
- Mode(s): Single-player

Math Blaster Jr. is a 1996 educational video game in the Blaster Learning System series aimed at teaching mathematics to children aged 4–8. The game was rebranded as Math Blaster: Ages 4–6 in 1997.

Math Blaster Jr. was followed by Reading Blaster Jr. and Science Blaster Jr., which shared characters, artwork, and music.

== Production ==
The game was officially announced by Davidson & Associates in February 1996 as a spin-off to the series of Math Blaster games that began with the 1982 title Math Blaster!, and it was intended for younger audience. At the time of the announcement, the game was expected to be released in the second quarter of 1996 but was delayed later into the year.

Jan Davidson, president and founder of Davidson & Associates, explained that once players master this game, they are expected to graduate to Math Blaster Episode I: In Search of Spot, which is the narrative successor.

== Gameplay ==
The game sees the Blaster Pal characters head to the Plusto galaxy in outer space to solve maths problems. By solving addition and subtraction problems, they earn printable certificates. The game contains several activities, puzzles, and songs. The game is intended to encourage "math readiness".

== Critical reception ==
Reception

Review score
Publication	Score
MacAddict	Spiff

PC Mag praised the game for effortlessly introducing maths concepts with humour, 3D graphics, and age-appropriate music, noting that it would appeal to adults as well as children. Black Enterprise recommended the game as a perfect preschool gift for the holiday season, along with Nick Jr. Play Math (Viacom New Media), JumpStart Preschool (Knowledge Adventure), Schoolhouse Rock: Grammar Rock (Creative Wonders), School Zone's Alphabet Express (School Zone Publishing), Reading Blaster Jr. (Davidson & Associates), Money Town (Davidson & Associates), Kid Pack 2 Deluxe (WizardWorks), and Reader Rabbit's Reading Development Library 1-4 (The Learning Company).
