= Arminda =

Arminda is a feminine name derived from the Roman name Arminius.

Notable people with the name Arminda include:

- Arminda, a main character in Mozart's opera La finta giardiniera.
- Arminda, a character in the 1985 British video game Dread Dragon Doom
- Arminda Aberastury (1910–1972), Argentinian psychoanalyst
- Jane Arminda Delano (1862–1919), nurse and founder of the American Red Cross Nursing Service
- Arminda Schutte (1909–1995), Cuban pianist
- Arminda Lopes Coelho de Mira (1887–1964), Portuguese physicist. Pioneered early studies on radioactivity and radiation in Portugal during the 1920s - relatively new concepts at the time.
- Arminda Elisabeth, Countess von Schmettau (1676–1753), Prussian noblewoman

Flightless grasshopper genus:

- Arminda (grasshopper), on the Canary Islands
