= The Great Brain Robbery =

The Great Brain Robbery may refer to:

- The Great Brain Robbery (board game), a 2000 board game
- Math Blaster Mystery: The Great Brain Robbery, a 1998 video game about mathematics
- "The Great Brain Robbery" (Justice League Unlimited episode)
- The Great Brain Robbery (album), a 2000 album by The Crocketts
