= Math Blaster Mystery =

1989 video game

- Developer: Davidson & Associates
- Publishers: Davidson & Associates
- Series: Blaster Learning System
- Platforms: Apple II, Apple IIGS, Mac
- Release: 1989
- Genre: Educational

Math Blaster Mystery is a 1989 educational video game developed by Davidson & Associates for the Apple II, Apple IIGS, and Mac and published in 1989. It followed Math Blaster! and Alge-Blaster! as the third entry in the Blaster Learning System franchise.

== Reception ==
Compute! deemed it a "departure from the rote software that Davidson is best known for". The Baltimore Sun recommended the game for older players. The paper Mathematics Achievement Among Chinese-American and Caucasian-American Fifth and Sixth Grade Girls assessed the educational capabilities of the title, noting that the minigame Follow the Steps was "designed to help develop strategies for solving word problems step by step". Second International Handbook of Mathematics Education noted its uniqueness in framing word problems through context relevant to the overall game narrative, though added that it rarely went beyond elementary arithmetic.

=== Awards ===
Year	Nominee / work	Award	Result
1990	Math Blaster Mystery	Software Publishers Association award for Best Secondary Education Program	Won
