= Math Blaster Episode II: Secret of the Lost City =

- Developer: Davidson & Associates
- Publishers: Davidson & Associates
- Series: Blaster Learning System
- Platforms: Windows, Macintosh
- Release: October 5, 1994
- Genre: Educational (mathematics)
- Mode: Single-player

Math Blaster Episode II: Secret of the Lost City is an educational game in the Blaster Learning System by Davidson & Associates and is the sequel to Math Blaster Episode I: In Search of Spot. In the plot of this math game, the evil Dr. Minus shoots down Blasternaut, Spot, and Galactic Commander as they search for the Lost City in their Galactic Cruiser. They crash, thankfully, next to the Lost City. Dr. Minus' 'Negatrons' try to stop them as they unlock the secret of the Lost City to save Galactic Command.

== Levels ==
- Number Hunt - the players must pull chains, hit pressure pads, or punch buttons to activate doors or elevators to collect operations and numbers to complete the equation.
- Maze Craze - the players solve the equation above using five estimations while jumping from platform to platform.
- Position Splash - the players need to get the Negatrons with the right number (the one that completes the equation) into the bottom tubes. They must hit the Negatrons with the wrong numbers with 'Position Pods' to keep them out.
- Creature Creator - the players create a creature by using tools. Each arrow indicates the number of changes that occur from box-to-box. The players must complete all of the other sections before unlocking this section.

There are different gameplay levels: Space Rookie, Space Captain, and Master Blaster.

There are also three different math levels as well as different operations: Addition, Subtraction, Division, Multiplication, Percents, Decimals, and Fractions.

== Reception ==
Reception

Review scores
Publication	Score
Parents Magazine	4/4
CD-ROM Today	4.5/5

== See also ==
- Blaster Learning System
- Math Blaster Episode I: In Search of Spot
- Reading Blaster 2000
