= Math Blaster for 1st Grade =

1999 video game

- Developer: Knowledge Adventure
- Publisher: Knowledge Adventure
- Series: Blaster Learning System
- Platform: Windows
- Release: 1999
- Genre: Edutainment

Math Blaster for 1st Grade is a 1999 educational video game in a line of educational products originally created by Davidson & Associates and continued by Knowledge Adventure. The game was re-released in 2000 as Math Blaster Mission 2.

== Plot ==
The Blaster gang, consisting of Max, G.C. and Mel, visit the Intergalactic Zoo, where they must lure out the animals to do exercise, which they do through cards which they collect by completing maths minigames.

The minigames teach skills including counting, equalities, measurement, sorting, addition and subtraction, time telling, story problems, money and logic.

== Critical reception ==
SuperKids suggested that "although the activities included in Math Blaster for 1st Grade are not all that different from those encountered in similar programs for this age range, the settings are imaginative and likely to amuse most 1st grade users". Cyber-Reviews wrote that the game "offers the same great graphics, animation and sound effects found in the other Blaster series of educational CDs with arcade-style games and activities". Kids Domain was positive to the game in their review. The Academy of Interactive Arts & Sciences wrote: "The record keeping is comprehensive and the graphics, sounds and navigation features are all unusually good...the variety of activities and the excellent design make this program a real winner".

== Awards ==
Year	Nominee / work	Award	Result
2000	Math Blaster for 1st Grade	Computer Educational Title of the Year	Nominated
