= Math Blaster Mystery: The Great Brain Robbery =

1994 video game

- Cover art
- Developer: Davidson & Associates
- Publishers: Davidson & Associates (Original); Knowledge Adventure (Remake)
- Producer: Don DeLucia
- Series: Blaster Learning System
- Platforms: Windows, Macintosh
- Release: October 5, 1994
- Genres: Adventure, educational (mathematics)
- Mode: Single-player

Math Blaster Mystery: The Great Brain Robbery is a product in a line of educational products created by Davidson & Associates that takes place in a different universe from the original Math Blaster. It has no relation to Davidson's earlier Apple II game Math Blaster Mystery. The game was released in North America, Sweden and Spain. The game was remade in 1998 with the title Math Blaster: Pre-Algebra. The game is regarded as a 'Review and Practice' type of software.

== Plot ==
In the original game, Dr. Dudley Dabble has stolen the brain of the maths genius Big Brain to win in the great mathematics competition. Rave goes to the mad scientist's mansion to liberate the brain.

In the remake of the game, Dr. Dabble has engineered a brain machine that drains and collects all the mathematics from the population's minds. Rave goes to the mad scientist's mansion three times to disable the machine.

== Gameplay ==
The player has to navigate Rave around Dr. Dabble's mansion solving math puzzles and collecting key items to progress, until Dr. Dabble's lab is reached. The math puzzles consist of multiple choice questions, formulas, arithmetics, estimates, ratios, negative numbers, BODMAS, decimals and algebraic equations. Every math puzzle activity has three different difficulty levels to choose from. By the near end of the game, the player has to win an arcade-style platformer level by throwing goo at Dr. Dabble's critters.

The remake has the same style of gameplay as the original, but with newer graphics, a different mansion layout, additional math puzzles, background and music tracks. There are two game modes: The Explore Mode, which allows the player to freely explore the mansion and focus on specific math topics and the Mystery Mode which requires the player to do all activities and play the game three times to finish it.

== Educational goals ==
Math Blaster Pre-Algebra helps introduce the concept of algebra to users in a creative manner, developing their critical skills required for algebra and advanced mathematics. When a user has difficulty tackling a math problem, the solution is shown step by step to reinforce technique. The entire game teaches a variety of topics in a fun and entertaining way.

== Reception ==
Reception

Review score
Publication	Score
Home PC	4/4

Award
Publication	Award
Parents' Choice Foundation	Seal of Approval

Math Blaster Mystery was given a 4 out of 4 star rating by the Home PC magazine adding that "most games aren't educational AND fun, but Math Blaster Mystery is both". It also received a Seal of Approval from the Parents' Choice Foundation.
