= Simon & Schuster =

American publishing company

Simon & Schuster LLC

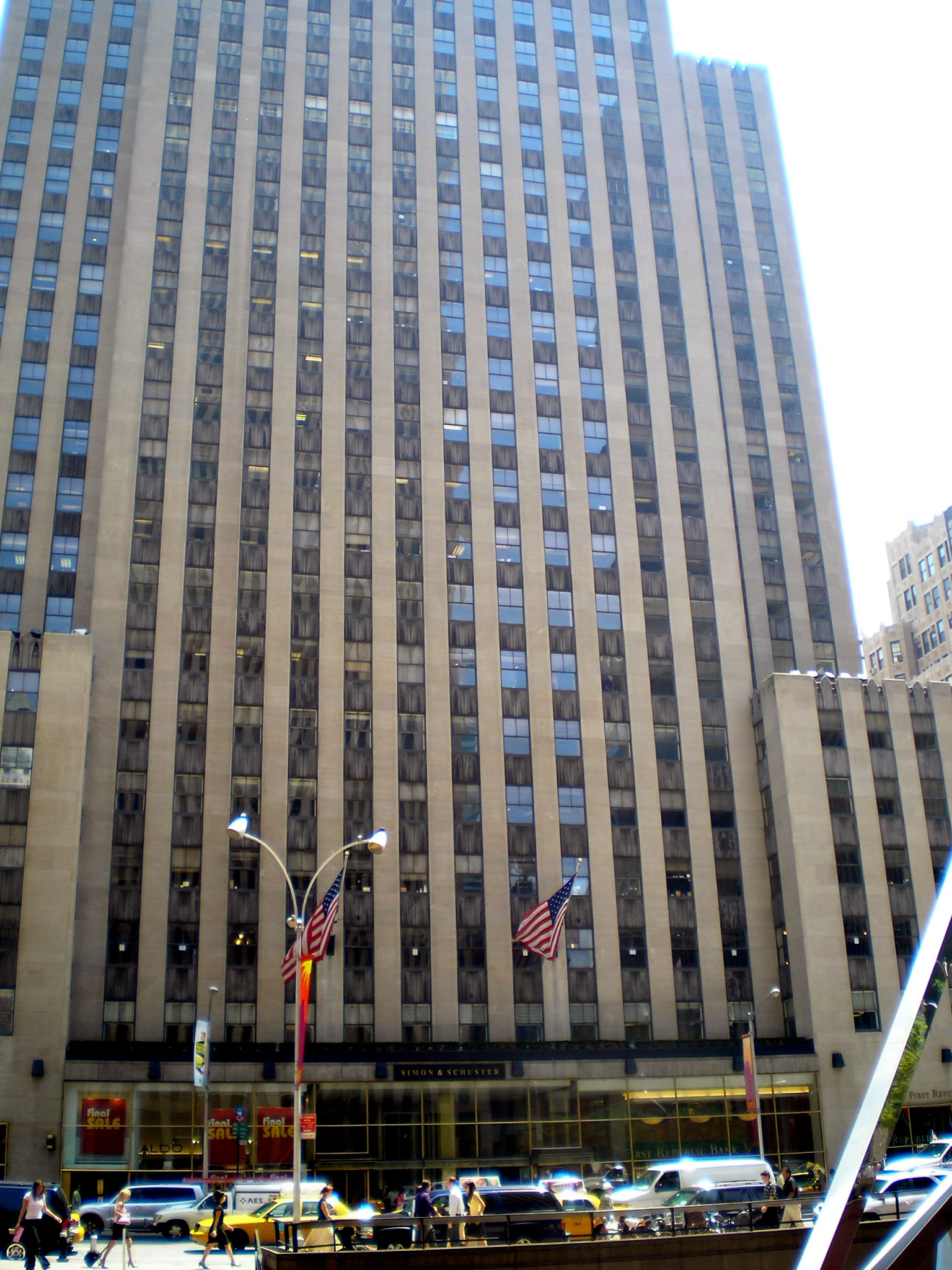
- Headquarters in New York City
- Formerly: Simon & Schuster, Inc. (1924–1993); Paramount Publishing (1993–1994); Simon & Schuster, Inc. (1994–2024)
- Type: Private
- Founded: January 2, 1924; 102 years ago
- Founders: Richard Simon; Max Schuster
- Headquarters: Simon & Schuster Building, Manhattan, New York City, United States
- Area served: Worldwide
- Key people: Greg Greeley (CEO); Dennis Eulau (CFO, EVP of operations); Perminder Mann (chief executive, UK, Australia and India); Kevin Hanson (president, Canada)
- Products: Books
- Services: See § Imprints
- Revenue: ▲US$1.1 billion (2022)
- Owner: Gulf and Western Industries (1975–1989); Paramount Communications (1989–1994); Viacom (1994–2005); CBS Corporation (2006–2019); Paramount Global (2019–2023); Kohlberg Kravis Roberts (2023–present)
- Number of employees: c. 1,600 (2023)
- Website: www.simonandschuster.com

Simon & Schuster LLC (/ˈʃuːstər/ SHOO-stər) is an American publishing house owned by Kohlberg Kravis Roberts since 2023. It was founded in New York City in 1924, by Richard L. Simon and M. Lincoln Schuster. Along with Penguin Random House, Hachette, HarperCollins and Macmillan Publishers, Simon & Schuster is considered one of the "Big Five" English-language publishers. As of 2017, Simon & Schuster was the third largest publisher in the United States, publishing 2,000 titles annually under 35 different imprints.

== History ==
=== Early years ===
In 1924, Richard Simon's aunt, a crossword puzzle enthusiast, asked whether there was a book of New York World crossword puzzles, which were popular at the time. After discovering that none had been published, Simon and Max Schuster decided to launch a company to exploit the opportunity. At the time, Simon was a piano salesman and Schuster was editor of an automotive trade magazine. They pooled US$8,000, equivalent to $150,000 today and started a company that published crossword puzzles.

The new publishing house used "fad" publishing to publish books that exploited current fads and trends. Simon called this "planned publishing". Instead of signing authors with a planned manuscript, they came up with their own ideas, and then hired writers to carry them out.

In the 1930s, the publisher moved to "Publisher's Row" on Park Avenue in Manhattan, New York.

=== Expansion ===
In 1939, Simon & Schuster backed Robert Fair de Graff to found Pocket Books, America's first paperback publisher. In 1942, Simon & Schuster and Western Publishing launched the Little Golden Books series in cooperation with the Artists and Writers Guild.

In 1944, Marshall Field III, owner of the Chicago Sun, purchased Simon & Schuster and Pocket Books. The company was sold back to Simon & Schuster following his death in 1957 for $1 million.

In the 1950s and 1960s, many publishers including Simon & Schuster turned toward educational publishing due to the baby boom market. Pocket Books focused on paperbacks for the educational market instead of textbooks and started the Washington Square Press imprint in 1959. By 1964, it had published more than 200 titles and was expected to put out another 400 by the end of that year. Books published under the imprint included classic reprints such as Lorna Doone, Ivanhoe, Tom Sawyer, Huckleberry Finn, and Robinson Crusoe. In 1967, Simon & Schuster acquired Monarch Press Publishing, Inc. with its extensive line of college and high school study guides.

In 1960, Richard Simon died of a heart attack; six years later, Max Schuster retired and sold his half of Simon & Schuster to Leon Shimkin. Shimkin then merged Simon & Schuster with Pocket Books under the name of Simon & Schuster. In 1968, editor-in-chief Robert Gottlieb, who had worked at Simon & Schuster since 1955 and edited several bestsellers including Joseph Heller's Catch-22, left abruptly to work at competitor Knopf, taking along influential S&S employees Nina Bourne and Tony Schulte.

On January 28, 1975, Simon & Schuster was acquired by Gulf+Western in an 8-for-1 stock swap. Four years later, in 1979, Richard Snyder was named CEO. Over the next several years he would help the company to grow substantially.

=== 1980s ===
After the death of Gulf+Western head Charles Bluhdorn on February 19, 1983, the publishing company made the decision to diversify. Bluhdorn's successor Martin Davis told The New York Times, "Society was undergoing dramatic changes so that there was a greater need for textbooks, maps, and educational information. We saw the opportunity to diversify into those areas, which are more stable and more profitable than trade publishing."

In 1984, Simon & Schuster under CEO Richard E. Snyder acquired educational publisher Esquire Corporation, owner of companies including Allyn & Bacon (and former owner of Esquire magazine), for $180 million. Prentice Hall was brought into the company fold in 1985 for $700 million, viewed by some executives as a catalyst to change the company as a whole. This acquisition was followed by Silver Burdett in 1986, mapmaker Gousha in 1987 and Charles E. Simon in 1988. Part of the acquisition included educational publisher Allyn & Bacon which, according to then editor and chief Michael Korda, became the "nucleus of S&S's educational and informational business". Three California educational companies were also purchased between 1988 and 1990 – Quercus, Fearon Education and Janus Book Publishers. In all, Simon & Schuster spent more than $1 billion in acquisitions between 1983 and 1991.

In the 1980s, Snyder also made an unsuccessful bid toward video publishing, At the start, Snyder was dismayed to realize that though Simon & Schuster had a huge bestseller in Jane Fonda's Workout Book, they did not own the rights to the VHS, which was earning even better. This prompted Snyder to ask editors to obtain video rights for every new book. Agents were often reluctant to give these up, and the S&S Video division never took off. However, in 1985 Simon & Schuster then launched its profitable audiobook division, which became a major business for the company by the 1990s.

In 1989, Gulf and Western Inc., owner of Simon & Schuster, changed its name to Paramount Communications Inc.

=== 1990s ===
In 1990, The New York Times described Simon & Schuster as the largest book publisher in the United States, with sales of $1.3 billion the previous year. That same year, Simon & Schuster acquired the children's publisher Green Tiger Press.

In 1993, Simon & Schuster bought Macmillan (including Scribner's, Free Press, and Jossey-Bass), and changed its name to Paramount Publishing. Viacom then bought Paramount in 1994 and changed the name back to Simon & Schuster. Macmillan was acquired for US$552.8 million. Later that year, Snyder was suddenly fired from S&S and was replaced by the company's president and chief operating officer Jonathan Newcomb. Simon & Schuster then sold several peripheral assets, such as selling Charles E. Simon Co. to CDB Infotek. Gousha was sold to Rand McNally in 1996.

In 1994, S&S acquired the software operations of Markt+Technik. Later that year, Simon & Schuster (through Paramount) launched a software publisher in partnership with Davidson & Associates named Simon & Schuster Interactive. The studio published video games such as Outlaw Golf, Deer Avenger, I.M. Meen, Chill Manor, EVE Online, and games based on Richard Scarry's characters. S&S Interactive shut down in 2003.

In 1998, Viacom sold Simon & Schuster's educational operations (including Prentice Hall, Macmillan, and Jossey-Bass) to Pearson plc, the global publisher and then owner of Penguin and the Financial Times; Pearson then merged the operations with Addison-Wesley Longman to form Pearson Education. Later, Pearson sold several of the acquired S&S divisions: first Appleton & Lange was divested to McGraw-Hill and Master Data Central was sold to Master Data Center. Then, Jossey-Bass was sold to John Wiley & Sons and the Bureau of Business Practice was sold to Wolters Kluwer. Subsequently, Macmillan Library Reference's children's imprints (Silver Burdett Press, Dillon Press, Crestwood House, Silver Press, New Discovery and Julian Messner) were closed. Then, Gale acquired Macmillan Library Reference (Charles Scribner's Sons Reference, Macmillan Reference, Thorndike Press, G.K. Hall, Twayne Publishers and Schirmer Books). Finally, IDG Books acquired Macmillan General Reference (including Frommer's, J.K. Lasser, Betty Crocker Cookbooks, Weight Watchers Dieting and Cookbooks and Howell House Pet Books but excluding Complete Idiot's Guides, which Pearson later transferred to Macmillan Computer Publishing under Alpha Books and currently part of Penguin Random House under Dorling Kindersley).

=== 2000s ===
In 2002, Simon & Schuster acquired its Canadian distributor Distican. Simon & Schuster began publishing in Canada in 2013.

At the end of 2005, Viacom split into two companies: CBS Corporation (which inherited S&S and Paramount Parks), and the other retaining the Viacom name. Also in 2005, Simon & Schuster acquired Strebor Books International, which was founded in 1999 by author Kristina Laferne Roberts, who has written under the pseudonym "Zane". A year later, in 2006, Simon & Schuster launched the conservative imprint Threshold Editions.

In 2009, Simon & Schuster signed a multi-book and co-publishing deal with Glenn Beck which appeared under many of its imprints and included adult non-fiction, fiction, children, and YA literature as well as e-book and audiobook originals. As part of CBS, Simon & Schuster has been the primary publisher for books related to various media franchises owned by and/or aired on CBS such as CSI. The company has also held a license to publish books in the Star Trek franchise under Pocket Books.

=== 2010s ===
In 2011, Simon & Schuster signed a number of co-publishing deals. Glenn Beck signed a new co-publishing deal with Simon & Schuster for his own imprint, Mercury Ink. Under Atria, Simon & Schuster also launched a publishing venture with Cash Money Records called Cash Money Content.

On April 11, 2012, the United States Department of Justice filed United States v. Apple Inc., naming Apple, Simon & Schuster, and four other major publishers as defendants. The suit alleged that they conspired to fix prices for e-books, and weaken Amazon.com's position in the market, in violation of antitrust law.

Simon & Schuster reorganized all of their imprints under four main groups in 2012. The four groups included the Atria Publishing Group, the Scribner Publishing Group, the Simon & Schuster Publishing Group and the Gallery Publishing Group. According to CEO Carolyn Reidy, the divisions were created to align imprints that complement one another and that the structure would "lead to a sharper editorial focus for our imprints even as it takes consideration of the natural affinities among them." In 2012, Simon & Schuster launched a self-publishing arm of the company, Archway Publishing.

On November 14, 2013, Simon & Schuster signed a co-publishing agreement with former New York Yankees shortstop, Derek Jeter, to launch Jeter Publishing. In December 2013, a federal judge approved a settlement of the antitrust claims, in which Simon & Schuster and the other publishers paid into a fund that provided credits to customers who had overpaid for books due to the price-fixing.

In 2014, Simon & Schuster signed a partnership deal with Amazon over ebooks and also launched a new speculative fiction imprint. On October 21, 2014, Simon & Schuster signed a multi-year partnership deal with Amazon.com in negotiations concerning the price of e-books. Simon & Schuster also launched a new science fiction imprint called Simon451 that would publish titles across science fiction and fantasy with an emphasis on ebooks and online communities. The name of the imprint was inspired by Ray Bradbury's book Fahrenheit 451 (the temperature at which books burn). Bradbury's classic is also published by Simon & Schuster.

Simon & Schuster expanded beyond book publishing in 2015 by offering a new business model and additional services for authors. In 2015, Simon & Schuster announced the creation of a new publishing unit and imprint called North Star Way. The imprint would publish non-fiction titles such as self-improvement, inspirational and mind-body-spirit titles. In addition, the group would also serve as a platform and set of services for authors that go beyond what a traditional book publisher offers to find their audience. The services include helping authors expand their reach through online courses, seminars, workshops, mobile applications, video and audiobooks, sponsorships and business partnerships, and podcasts. North Star Way sits within the Gallery Publishing Group division. According to Michele Martin, publisher and founder, the name North Star reflects their mission, "to publish books that will help readers find the path to a better life, and to be a guide for our authors, not only through publication of their books but also in the many other activities that can help their message find the widest possible audience." In an interview with Kirkus Reviews, Michele Martin expanded that North Star Way, "aims to meet consumers where they are, in whatever form of media they consume. We expand the ideas in the books into a variety of platforms." The name prompted Marvel Comics to attempt to register the name of their superhero Northstar in February 2015. The application was denied as Simon & Schuster had already made a trademark application for North Star Way in January.

Simon & Schuster launched SimonSays.com a portal for online video courses in 2016, along with Scout Press, a new literary fiction imprint under Gallery Books Group. They also launched North Star Way, a platform-based program to provide authors with services beyond publishing including brand management, online courses, sponsorship, and business partnerships. Also as of 2016, Simon & Schuster had more than 18k e-books available for sale and signed a deal to distribute Start Publishing LLC, a catalog of 7,000 e-book titles.

In 2019, CBS and Viacom reunited to form ViacomCBS. As a result, Simon & Schuster became part of the newly formed ViacomCBS. Since February 15, 2022, ViacomCBS is known as Paramount Global.

=== 2020s ===
In March 2020, ViacomCBS CEO Bob Bakish announced the company's intention to sell the Simon & Schuster division, as it "does not have significant connection for our broader business." Bakish expected the sale to close in 2020, a date that was delayed by the COVID-19 pandemic.

In May 2020, the company's CEO Carolyn Reidy died unexpectedly from a heart attack. Jonathan Karp was appointed as her replacement.

A purchase by German media group Bertelsmann was eventually blocked on anti-trust grounds. In September 2020 Bertelsmann, which owns Penguin Random House, announced that it was interested in acquiring Simon & Schuster. According to Bertelsmann chief executive and chairman Thomas Rabe, "We've been the most active player on the consolidation of the book publishing market in the last 10 years. We combined Penguin and Random House very successfully to create by far the largest book publisher in the world, actually the only global book publisher. Given this position we would, of course, be interested in Simon & Schuster." Vivendi, which owns the French publisher Editis, and News Corp, which owns HarperCollins, were also named as contenders in acquiring Simon & Schuster. ViacomCBS expected the bids to be placed before November 26, 2020. On November 25, 2020, ViacomCBS announced it would sell Simon & Schuster to Penguin Random House for $2.175 billion, with the deal expected to close in 2022. On November 2, 2021, the United States Department of Justice filed a civil antitrust lawsuit to block the acquisition, arguing the combined publisher would have too much influence over books and author payments. A federal judge sided with the government, leading Paramount to nullify the deal in November 2022. An appeal to the court ruling was announced a day later by Bertelsmann, but canceled November 21.

In 2021, Simon & Schuster made book deals with former Trump administration officials such as Vice President Mike Pence and Trump adviser Kellyanne Conway. This prompted protests among Simon & Schuster staff.

In 2022, Simon & Schuster employee Filippo Bernardini was arrested for the 2016–2021 literary phishing thefts. The company released a statement saying they were "shocked and horrified to learn today of the allegations of fraud and identity theft by an employee."

In June 2023, The Wall Street Journal reported that HarperCollins and investment firm Kohlberg Kravis Roberts (KKR) had emerged as potential frontrunners to acquire the company. On August 3, 2023, it was reported that KKR was in "advanced talks" with Paramount Global. On August 7, 2023, Paramount Global announced that it had agreed to sell Simon & Schuster to KKR for $1.62 billion. The sale was completed on October 30, 2023.

In May 2024, Simon & Schuster acquired Veen Bosch & Keuning (VBK), the largest Dutch book publishing company. The acquisition includes all of VBK's imprints in the Netherlands and Belgium, as well as its sister companies, the audiobook producer Thinium, and Bookchoice, a subscription-based platform for e-books and audiobooks. This is the first expansion of Simon & Schuster into a non-English market. In September 2024, it was announced that Simon & Schuster Australia had entered an agreement to acquire publisher Affirm Press.

In August 2025, the company announced its CEO Jonathan Karp was stepping down from the company to launch Simon Six, a new, sister company of Simon & Schuster. In March 2026, Simon & Schuster announced the appointment of Greg Greeley as its new chief executive. Greeley is the first CEO appointed from outside the company.

== People ==
=== Editors and publishers ===
- Clifton Fadiman Jr., editor-in-chief
- Jack Goodman, editor-in-chief
- Jerome Weidman, editor-in-chief
- Joe Barnes, editor-in-chief
- Justin Kaplan
- Max Schuster (editor-in-chief)
- Michael Korda (editor-in-chief)
- Quincy Howe (editor-in-chief)
- Robert Gottlieb
- Peter Schwed
- Wallace Brockway (editor-in-chief)
- William Cole
- Maxwell Perkins

=== Authors ===
Simon & Schuster has published thousands of books from thousands of authors. This list represents some of the more notable authors (those who are culturally significant or have had several bestsellers, meaning they have sold at least 3,000 books).

- Andrew Solomon
- Annie Proulx
- Audrey Niffenegger
- Bob Woodward
- Britney Spears
- Carrie Fisher
- Chapo Trap House
- Cornelius Ryan
- Dan Brown
- David McCullough
- Dick Cheney
- Donald Trump
- Doris Kearns Goodwin
- Doris Lessing
- Ernest Hemingway
- F. Scott Fitzgerald
- Frank McCourt
- Glenn Beck
- Kayleigh McEnany
- Ludwig Bemelmans
- Harold Robbins
- Hendrik Willem van Loon
- Hillary Clinton
- Howard Stern
- Hunter S. Thompson
- Jack Paar
- Jackie Collins
- James Riley
- Janet Evanovich
- Jimmy Carter
- Pinky Cole
- Jodi Picoult
- John Bolton
- John Irving
- Joseph Heller
- Jennette McCurdy
- Judith Rossner
- Kay Thompson
- Larry McMurtry
- Lana Del Rey
- Maddox
- Mark R. Levin
- Mary Higgins Clark
- P. G. Wodehouse
- Peter Hook
- Philippa Gregory
- R. L. Stine
- Sandra Brown
- Shel Silverstein
- Siddhartha Mukherjee
- Sister Souljah
- Stephen E. Ambrose
- Stephen King
- Thomas Berger
- Thomas Wolfe
- Ursula K. Le Guin
- Vikas Swarup
- Walter Isaacson
- Zoella

== Logo ==
According to one source, The Sower, the logo of Simon & Schuster, was inspired by the 1850 painting of the same name by Jean-François Millet. According to Michael Korda, the colophon is a small reproduction of The Sower by Sir John Everett Millais.

== Imprints ==
=== Adult publishing ===
- Adams Media, located in Avon, Massachusetts
- Atria Publishing Group
  - 37 INK, publisher of African-American and other diverse voices
  - Atria Books, general publisher
  - Atria Español, publisher of Spanish language books with a focus on United States Spanish speakers
  - Atria Unbound, general publisher of ebook editions of Atria
  - Beyond Words Publishing co-venture with Atria specializing in the mind-body-spirit category
  - Cash Money Content, a co-venture with Cash Money Records
  - Emily Bestler Books, publisher of fiction and non-fiction
  - Enliven Books, publisher of spiritual and wellness books
  - Howard Books, publisher of Christian books
  - Keywords Press, publisher of books by Internet personalities
  - Marble Arch Press, co-publishing agreement with the United Kingdom publisher Short Books
  - One Signal Publishers, nonfiction publisher founded by Julia Cheiffetz
  - Simon Element, publishes nonfiction books addressing foundational topics.
  - Strebor Books International, publisher of African-American books as well as Black Erotica
  - Washington Square Press, paperback publisher of classic and contemporary fiction
- Avid Reader Press
- Gallery Books Group
  - Gallery Books, general interest publisher
  - Karen Hunter Publishing, general interest imprint founded by journalist Karen Hunter
  - Mercury Ink, co-publishing deal with Glenn Beck and Mercury Radio Arts
  - MTV Entertainment Books (formerly MTV Books), young adult and pop-culture imprint
  - North Star Way Books, inspirational non-fiction imprint with additional services for authors
  - Pocket Books, mass market imprint of the Gallery Publishing Group
  - Pocket Star, e-book only imprint of the Gallery Publishing Group
  - Scout Press, publisher of literary fiction
  - Threshold Editions, conservative imprint
  - Twelve, an imprint that publishes each book with a month-long launch
  - Gallery 13, a graphic novel imprint
- Scribner
  - Scribner, publisher of fiction and non-fiction books
- Simon & Schuster (the flagship imprint)
  - Folger Shakespeare Library, publishes print and ebooks of Shakespeare works
  - Simon451, publisher of speculative fiction and fantasy
  - Saga Press (specializes in science fiction and fantasy)
  - Summit Books (first incarnation operated by James H. Silberman 1976–1991, revived in 2024)

=== Children's publishing ===
- Aladdin, publisher of picture and chapter books for middle-grade readers
- Atheneum, publisher of literary middle grade, teen and picture books
- Beach Lane Books, publisher of picture books, founded in 2008 and located in San Diego
- BFYR, publisher of children's books
- Little Simon, publisher of children's books
- Margaret K. McElderry Books, boutique imprint publisher of literary fiction and nonfiction for children and teens
- MTV Books, pop culture imprint relaunched in 2021
- Paula Wiseman Books, publisher of picture books, novelty books and novels for children
- Salaam Reads, imprint for Muslim children's literature by Simon & Schuster's Children's Division
- Simon & Schuster Books for Young Readers, flagship imprint of Simon & Schuster's Children's Division
- Simon Spotlight, publisher focused on licensed properties for children

=== Audio ===
- Pimsleur Language Programs, language courses
- Simon & Schuster Audio, Audio division of Simon & Schuster

=== Former imprints ===
- Archway (children's imprint of Pocket Books, merged into Aladdin Paperbacks)
- Bookthrift (Inexpensive reprints, discontinued)
- Earthlight (UK science fiction imprint, discontinued)
- Downtown Press (women's fiction, discontinued)
- Fireside Books
- Free Press
- Green Tiger Press
- Half Moon Books
- Inner Sanctum Mysteries
- Linden Press
- Long Shadow Books
- Minstrel Books (children's imprint of Pocket Books, merged into Aladdin Paperbacks)
- Poseidon Press (operated 1982–1993)
- Richard Gallen Books
- Simon & Schuster Interactive (1995–2003)
- Simon Pulse, publisher of teen books, launched in 1999 as Pocket Pulse and renamed in 2001
- Sonnet Books
- Tiller Press (specializes in "practical nonfiction": diet, wellness, home design.)
- Touchstone, Touchstone Books (closed December 2018)
- Wallaby Books

== See also ==
- The other "Big Five" English language book publishers: Hachette, Holtzbrinck/Macmillan, HarperCollins and Penguin Random House
- Books in the United States
- List of largest book publishers of the United Kingdom
- Media of New York City
