= Greg Greeley =

American businessman

Greg W. Greeley is an American business executive and the chief executive of Simon & Schuster, a role he has held since March 2026. He is a former president at Airbnb where he oversaw the homes division, including the Airbnb Plus program offering rentals with more hotel-like services.

== Education ==
Greeley attended the University of Washington and the University of Southern California. He received his MBA in 1998 from the University of California, Berkeley, Haas School of Business.

== Career ==
Prior to being hired by Airbnb on March 6, 2018, Greeley worked at Amazon as the Vice President of Amazon Prime. Greeley had been at Amazon for more than 18 years.

At Airbnb, Greeley lead the Homes unit which includes Airbnb's standard offering as well as Airbnb plus, which was launched on February 22, 2018, and is geared toward high-end travelers. Greeley also oversaw Airbnb Collections, the Superhost program, and the Superguest program. He reported directly to Airbnb Founder and CEO, Brian Chesky, before being let go from the company in July 2020.

Airbnb's decision to hire Greeley was criticized as he has no prior experience in the hospitality industry.

On March 9, 2026, he was appointed CEO of publishing house Simon & Schuster. He was the first CEO appointed from outside of the company to hold the position.
