= Carolyn Reidy =

American publishing executive (1949-2020)

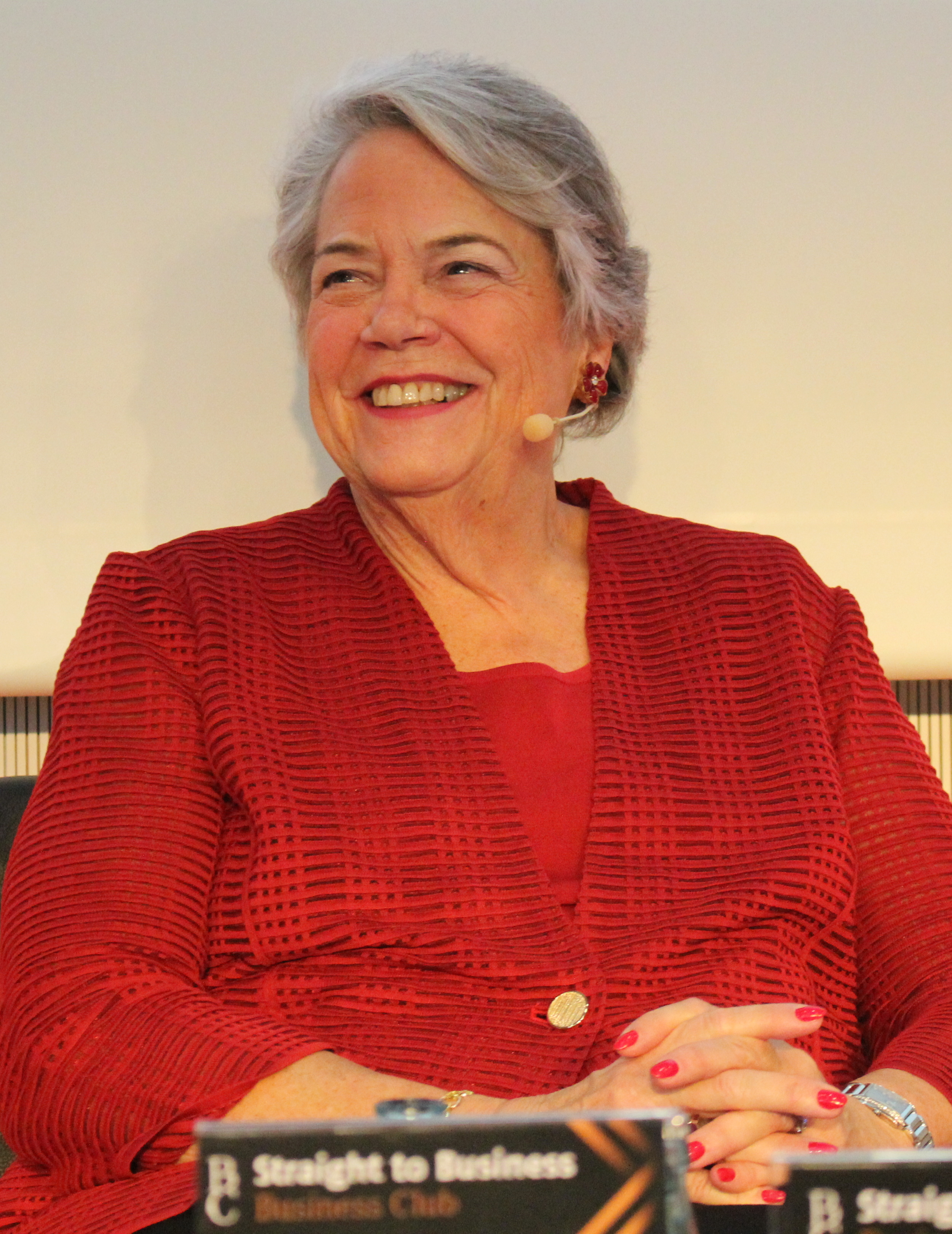
- Born: May 2, 1949
- Died: May 12, 2020 (aged 71); Southampton
- Education: Doctor of Philosophy
- Alma mater: Middlebury College; Indiana University
- Occupation: Chief executive officer (2008–2020), publisher (–1992)
- Employer: Simon & Schuster

Carolyn Kroll Reidy (May 2, 1949 – May 12, 2020) was an American business executive who was president and CEO of the American publishing company Simon & Schuster.

While CEO, Reidy was named the publishing industry's Person of the Year by the trade publication Publishers Weekly in 2019. In 2018, she was recognized as the PEN America Publisher Honoree.

== Early life and education ==
Carolyn Judith Kroll was born in Washington, D.C., on May 2, 1949, the daughter of Henry August Kroll and his wife, Mildred Josephine (née Mencke), and grew up in nearby Silver Spring, Maryland. She attended Middlebury College as an undergraduate and Indiana University Bloomington for graduate studies, where she earned a master of arts in 1974 and a Ph.D. in English in 1982. Her dissertation was titled, The reader as character in the High Victorian novel: studies of the reader/writer relationship in Vanity Fair, the Way We Live Now, Middlemarch, and the Egoist. Reidy's doctoral advisor was Donald Gray.

== Career ==
Reidy began her career in publishing in 1974 with Random House in the subsidiary rights department, and eventually became associate publisher and publisher of its subdivision, Vintage Books. She went on to be publisher and president of Avon Books.

In 1992, she joined Simon & Schuster as president of its Trade Division, then in 2001 became president of the Adult Publishing Group. She was made CEO of the entire publishing house in 2008.

She is known for navigating the company through the Great Recession and for publishing authors such as Doris Kearns Goodwin, David W. Blight, Stephen King, Jennifer Weiner, and Jason Reynolds.

== Personal life and death ==
In 1974, she married Stephen Reidy before joining Random House.

Carolyn Reidy died of a heart attack in Southampton, New York, on May 12, 2020, aged 71. She was survived by her husband and three siblings. She was posthumously awarded the Literarian Award for Outstanding Service to the American Literary Community.
