= Meister Cody =

2013 video game

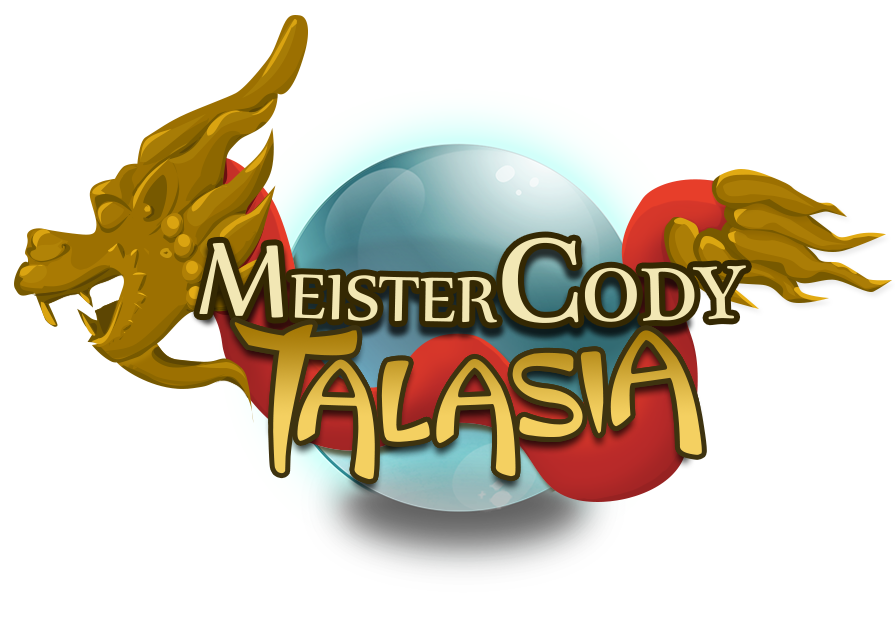
- Developer: Kaasa health
- Publisher: Kaasa health
- Platforms: Microsoft Windows, OS X, iOS, Android
- Release: December 1, 2013
- Genre: Educational game
- Mode: Single player

Meister Cody is an online training game with an integrated diagnostic screening test for children with dyscalculia and math weakness, the CODY Assessment. It was developed as a part of the CODY Project, a collaboration with psychologists and neuroscientists at the University of Münster, and technology experts at Kaasa health (an mHealth tech company based in Düsseldorf). The educational video game is used by parents, teachers and therapists as a diagnostic and therapeutic tool. The scientific research at the University of Münster drove the development of the computer-based training software.

== Concept ==
Before the training begins, children take the CODY Assessment, a voluntary screening test that detects four dyscalculia relevant aspects: core markers (Dot Enumeration (DE), Magnitude Comparison (MCS, MCM)), number processing skills, calculation skills, and working memory. The CODY training targets impaired number skills that could underlie dyscalculia. The focus lies on aspects of number and quantity processing, such as quantity-number-linkage, part-whole relationship, spatial ability, relational number perception, fact retrieval, subitizing, understanding of the positional notation system and transcoding. Training includes 19 different tasks. The first version of CODY training, which had four key tasks, was evaluated in a randomized controlled trial, and compared with a computer-based training of inductive reasoning. A meta-analysis by psychologists at the University of Münster about children with mathematical disorders showed: "Computer-based interventions were also effective". The math training is embedded in an adventure story and incorporates gamification via its reward system. Daily training (3–5 days per week) is recommended for maximum growth.

== Characters ==
The main character of the educational game is Meister Cody, a traveler, storyteller, scholar and master magician. He receives a call for help through his crystal ball from the Kingdom of Talasia. He asks the game player to assist Princess Namea and Prince Fandales to save Talasia. The epic story has many characters, such as the Genie, Port Master, Oracle, Forest Fairies and Ice Fairies. These characters give the child clues, support and motivation.

== Application ==
The game is aimed at elementary school children from the second to fourth grade, but it also develops basic math skills that could benefit children in kindergarten. Meister Cody – Talasia is an adaptive single player game. Leveling occurs automatically with each of the 19 tasks.

== Awards ==
- Best Educational Game in Europe 2014
- GIGA-Maus 2014
- 3. position: Vodafone Smart Solution Award 2013
- Dyslexia Quality Award 2015
- eco Internet Award 2015
- Serious Play Award 2015 (silver)
- Wittener Preis für Gesundheitsvisionäre 2016
