= Chill Manor =

1996 video game

- Developer: Animation Magic
- Publisher: Simon & Schuster Interactive
- Director: Jeffrey Siegel
- Producers: Amanda Thornton; Dale DeSharone
- Designer: Matt Sughrue
- Composer: Tony Trippi
- Platform: MS-DOS
- Release: NA: October 16, 1996
- Genres: Educational, First-person shooter
- Mode: Single-player

Chill Manor is an educational first-person shooter for MS-DOS compatible systems. The game is designed to teach history to children. It is the sequel to I.M. Meen and shares similar gameplay. Chloe Leamon provided Ophelia Chill's voice, while Peter Berkrot reprised his role as I.M. Meen.

== Plot ==
Ophelia Chill, the presumed wife of the evil magician, I.M. Meen, has stolen the Book of Ages and has ripped out all the pages, scattering them all across her manor. Chill explains that she has made her own changes to the pages, altering history as a result. A group of children, Kevin Leonard, Allison Barnes, Elliot French and Fiona Ramsey decide to enter the manor and recover the scattered pages.

The children venture through Chill's manor and recover the pages while correcting all of the false changes, correcting history as a result. Along the way, they are forced to battle many of the monsters and minions of Chill as well. The group eventually confronts and defeats Ophelia Chill themselves before they restrain her by tying her to a chair. Suddenly, I.M. Meen appears and rescues Chill by releasing her. Meen then jokingly bids farewell to the children believing that they shall meet again "very soon". Ophelia Chill then blows a raspberry and laughs maniacally at the children before she disappears as the game ends.

== Gameplay ==
The player goes through 20 levels, fixing history mistakes in various scrolls.

== Reception ==
In a retrospective review, AllGame gave Chill Manor a score of 3.5 out of 5.
