= Blaster's Universe =

- Genre: Children's television; Action; Adventure; Comedy; Science fiction; Educational
- Based on: Blaster Learning System by Knowledge Adventure
- Developed by: Jamie Tatham; Dale Schott
- Written by: Hugh Duffy(eps 1, 12); Ben Joseph(eps 2, 9, 13); Dave Dias(eps 3, 7, 11); Dale Schott (ep 4); Ken Ross(eps 5, 8); Kim Thompson(eps 6, 10)
- Directed by: Larry Jacobs; Dan Hennessey(voice)
- Voices of: Jonathan Wilson; Maryke Hendrikse; Juan Chioran
- Theme music composer: Grayson Matthews for Tantrum Productions
- Opening theme: "Blaster's Universe Theme"; Vocals by Jonathan Wilson, Maryke Hendrikse, and Robert Tinkler(all uncredited)
- Ending theme: "Blaster's Universe Theme" (instrumental)
- Composers: Ray Parker; Tom Szcezsniak
- Countries of origin: Canada; China
- Original language: English
- No. of seasons: 1
- No. of episodes: 13

Production
- Executive producers: Patrick Loubert; Michael Hirsh; Clive A. Smith; James Wang; Cathy Siegel
- Running time: 30 minutes
- Production companies: Nelvana Limited; Hong Guang Animation (Su Zhou) Co., Ltd.; Knowledge Adventure

Original release
- Network: CBS (United States); Teletoon (Canada)
- Release: October 2 – December 25, 1999

Blaster's Universe is an animated children's television series, made by Nelvana and Hong Guang Animation, that ran for one season from October 2 to December 25, 1999 on CBS (reruns continued to air on CBS until September 9, 2000) and on Teletoon beginning January 4, 2000. It is based on Knowledge Adventure's Blaster Learning System series of educational software.

== Characters ==
- Max Blaster (voiced by Jonathan Wilson) – a 12-year-old Earth boy, based on the Blasternaut from the video game series.
- GC (voiced by Maryke Hendrikse) – a 12-year-old alien girl from the planet Omega.
- MEL (voiced by Juan Chioran) – Blaster and GC's robotic dog, his name is an abbreviation of "Mechanically Enhanced Lapdog".

== Episodes ==
No.	Title	Written by	Original air date (Teletoon)	U.S. air date (CBS)
1	"You're History"	Hugh Duffy	January 4, 2000	October 2, 1999
Blaster, GC and MEL run into Attila the Hun who kidnaps MEL. It is revealed that Major History is erasing all history. Using history against him, Blaster, GC and MEL foil his plot.
2	"A Bridge Too Weak"	Ben Joseph	January 9, 2000	October 9, 1999
Blaster and GC offer to help her dad, the Commander of Omega, by attending a bridge opening, but there are friends and enemies lingering around, involving Blaster.
3	"Misplaced Weekend"	Dave Dias	January 16, 2000	October 16, 1999
Blaster's break time is lost to school time. Blaster, GC and MEL head out to look for the missing weekend. Evil genius, Dr. Dabble, is the culprit and after a close call with a garbage monster they return the weekend and trick Dr. Dabble into finding time to go fishing.
4	"A Spot of Trouble"	Dale Schott	January 25, 2000	October 23, 1999
MEL's canine caper takes Blaster and GC on a race across the galaxy as they try to keep him out of the clutches of Von Shtoopenscooper, the Omegan Dog Catcher. After playing catch with a moon and chasing a few interstellar cars they finally get him home again.
5	"Uncool Copycat"	Ken Ross	January 30, 2000	October 30, 1999
GC thinks that Blaster is getting a little loony. What they discover is that a misguided artist named Deja Vu is making life size copies of everything including people, almost starting an intergalactic war, until Blaster and GC convince him originality is a virtue.
6	"Mind Over Manners"	Kim Thompson	February 6, 2000	November 6, 1999
Illitera decides to eliminate politeness. To prevent intergalactic war and being grounded until he is 20, Blaster, GC and MEL have to trick Illitera into returning politeness to the galaxy.
7	"Body Eclectic"	Dave Dias	February 13, 2000	November 13, 1999
Illitera decides to shrink the Commander to ruin his image. She had not counted on Blaster, GC and MEL being there to foil her plans and loses out once again.
8	"Hero Today, Gone Tomorrow"	Ken Ross	February 20, 2000	November 20, 1999
Ignoring his cleaning chores, Blaster goes with GC and MEL to follow a space pirate ship to the planet Moocowzia where they are treated like gods because they aren't helpless and can look after themselves, which inspires Blaster to clean his own room.
9	"Sound Advice"	Ben Joseph	February 27, 2000	November 27, 1999
GC wants to see Tone Def, play at the concert. The Maestro however plans to take over the concert. GC, Blaster and MEL track The Maestro and outsmart him, thanks to GC's music practice.
10	"Math Schmath"	Kim Thompson	March 5, 2000	December 4, 1999
GC has a duty to tutor Zak with his math, except that Zak is disruptive. Number Cruncher starts up an evil plot, but is thwarted by Zak's mathematical talent.
11	"Nowhere To Hide"	Dave Dias	March 12, 2000	December 11, 1999
Blaster and GC get into unusual trouble in the Omegan library, but then the library statue is stolen. It turns out the assistant librarian, Ms. Hushop hid it thinking she had broken it.
12	"Gym Nausium"	Hugh Duffy	March 19, 2000	December 18, 1999
Blaster and GC go on a cruise aboard a space age Roman galley. The catch is that in this holiday they are working out in preparation for a race.
13	"Buggin' Out"	Ben Joseph	March 26, 2000	December 25, 1999
Blaster is forced to face his worst nightmare, the Exterminator, who has the dreaded Y2K bug in a jar and is threatening to release it again. Blaster defeats both his fear of bugs and the Exterminator.
