= Peter Berkrot =

American voice actor

- Born: May 18, 1959 (age 65); New York, New York
- Years active: 1980–present
- Known for: Acting, voice acting, audiobooks
- Notable work: Angie in Caddyshack (1980); I. M. Meen in I. M. Meen (1995)

Peter Berkrot (born May 18, 1959) is an American voice actor, stage actor, director, producer, and freelance writer who has worked in television, the movie industry, video games, and theatre. He also runs his own acting school called New Voices, and writes for American Theatre Magazine.

He has worked in the television series America's Most Wanted, Unsolved Mysteries, and PBS Frontline. Berkrot's voice work in video games include Ignatius Mortimer Meen and Gnorris in I.M. Meen and Chill Manor and a jewelry merchant in Darkened Skye.

Berkrot is a voice over actor and audiobook narrator with 150 audiobooks and over 100 children's titles to his credit. He has won three Earphones Awards and was nominated for an Audie Award for the narration of Buddha Standard Time in 2012.

== Personal life ==
In November 1988, he married Karen A. Schionning.

He is a former resident of Newburyport.

Circa 2020, during the COVID-19 pandemic, he lived in Gloucester, Massachusetts. In 2020, he described "working from his 4-foot-by-4-foot soundproof booth", while his son Misha Berkrot operated the production panel outside of the booth. Circa 2020, Berkrot "[read] for a living, from morning until evening, whether it is performing at home in his sound studio or preparing for one of his recordings."

== See also ==
- List of voice actors
