= Blaster Learning System =

Educational video game franchise

- Genre: Edutainment
- Developers: Davidson & Associates; JumpStart Games; Blitz Games
- Publishers: Davidson & Associates (1983–1998); JumpStart Games (Knowledge Adventure) (1998–2023)
- Creators: Janice G. Davidson, PhD
- Platforms: Windows, Mac, Apple II, Apple IIGS
- First release: Math Blaster! 1983

The Blaster Learning System is an educational video game series created by Davidson & Associates and later published by JumpStart Games (formerly Knowledge Adventure) after the two companies were acquired and merged by CUC Software. The games primarily focused on mathematics, later expanding into language arts and science, and spawned an animated children's television series in 1999 called Blaster's Universe.

Starting in 2011, development of the series focused on an online version of Math Blaster played through a browser or mobile app rather than standalone game software. JumpStart Games ended the support for Math Blaster and was closed in July 2023.

== History ==
=== Davidson ===
Design of series protagonist Blasternaut from 1987 to 1999

The series began with the 1983 title Math Blaster! released for the Apple II and Atari 8-bit computers. The initial game was ported to other platforms and received gradual improvements to graphics and sound, with "Plus" added to the title in 1987 and "New" in 1990. The initial release was a collection of four unrelated activities with a space theme, with later versions connecting the activities with a simple narrative and introducing the character Blasternaut.

Spin-offs intended for older children included Alge-Blaster! in 1985 and Math Blaster Mystery in 1989. These titles, along with their 1990s remakes and sequels, would not follow the Blasternaut character but would still be marketed by Davidson as part of the Blaster series.

The first reboot of the Davidson fundamentals line came in 1989. The original Math Blaster was written in Applesoft Basic and the Microsoft equivalent. Under the direction of Mike Albanese, the Davidson programming team used Fig Forth to make a cross-platform development system; it was the first of many Forth-based products that Davidson would make.

The 1993 release Math Blaster Episode I: In Search of Spot was the first in the series to feature a storyline told through animated cutscenes and voice acting. The version of Blasternaut seen in this game, as well as his robot companion Spot and supervisor Galactic Commander (GC), would become recurring characters seen in the 1994 sequels Reading Blaster: Invasion of the Word Snatchers and Math Blaster Episode II: Secret of the Lost City.

A redesign of the characters was introduced in the 1996 title Mega Math Blaster (later rebranded Math Blaster: Ages 6–9), which served as a remake of the activities from Episode I with a new storyline, although references to the previous games in the series implied a shared continuity. This redesign would carry over into Reading Blaster 2000 (also rebranded Reading Blaster: Ages 6–9), the Episode II remake Math Blaster: Ages 9–12, and three "Junior" prequels for children ages 4-6 focused on math, reading, and science.

=== Knowledge Adventure ===
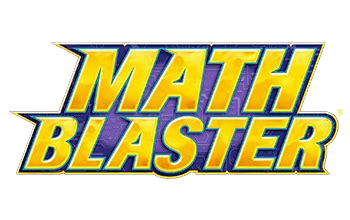
Logo for Math Blaster games released from 2006 onward

The characters were redesigned again in 1999, coinciding with the CBS Saturday morning cartoon Blaster's Universe animated by the Canadian studio Nelvana. The Blasternaut and GC characters were altered to be 12-year-old earthlings and Spot was replaced with a robot dog named MEL ("Mechanically Enhanced Lapdog"). The changes also coincided with Knowledge Adventure's rebranding of the full series and switch to identifying games by grade levels instead of age ranges. This would be the last time games in the Reading Blaster sub-series were released.

Math Blaster: Master the Basics was released in 2006, featuring another redesign of the Blasternaut character, comic book styled cutscenes, and 3D graphics in-game. This version of the character would also appear in the 2008 Nintendo DS title Math Blaster in the Prime Adventure.

Starting in 2011, development of the series focused on an online version of Math Blaster played through a browser or mobile app rather than standalone game software. JumpStart Games ended support for Math Blaster and was closed in July 2023.

== The Blaster series ==
=== Math ===
Games	Platforms and release years
Math Blaster!	Apple II, Atari 8-bit (1983); Commodore 64, MS-DOS (1985): Re-released as Math Blaster Plus!; Apple II, MS-DOS (1987); Apple IIGS (1989); Amiga (1990); Re-released as New Math Blaster Plus!; MS-DOS, Windows (1990)
Alge-Blaster!	Apple II, Commodore 64 (1985): Re-released as Alge-Blaster Plus!; Apple II, MS-DOS (1989); Mac (1990)
Math Blaster Mystery	Apple II, Mac (1989)
Math Blaster Episode I: In Search of Spot	MS-DOS (1993); Super NES, Genesis (1994); Windows (1995)
Math Blaster Episode II: Secret of the Lost City	Mac (1994); Windows (1995)
Math Blaster Mystery: The Great Brain Robbery	Windows (1994); Mac (1996): Re-released as Math Blaster: Pre-Algebra; Windows, Mac (1998); Re-released as Math Blaster for 5th Grade; Windows, Classic Mac OS (1999)
Alge-Blaster 3	Windows (1994); Macintosh (1995): Re-released as Math Blaster: Algebra; Windows, Mac (1998)
Mega Math Blaster	Windows, Mac (1996): Re-released as Math Blaster: Ages 6–9; Windows, Macintosh (1998); Re-released as Math Blaster for 3rd Grade; Windows, Mac (1999); Re-released as Math Blaster: Math Attack; Handheld LCD (1999)
Math Blaster Jr.	Windows, Mac (1996): Re-released as Math Blaster: Ages 4–6; Windows, Macintosh (1998)
Geometry Blaster	Windows, Macintosh (1996): Re-released as Math Blaster: Geometry; Windows, Mac (1998)
Math Blaster: Ages 9–12	Windows, Mac (1997): Re-released as Math Blaster for 4th Grade; Windows, Mac (1999)
Math Blaster for Kindergarten	Windows, Mac (1999): Re-released as Math Blaster Mission 1: Cosmic Critter Challenge; Windows, Mac (2000)
Math Blaster for 1st Grade	Windows, Macintosh (1999): Re-released as Math Blaster Mission 2: Race for the Omega Trophy; Windows, Mac (2000)
Math Blaster for 2nd Grade	Windows, Mac (1999): Re-released as Math Blaster: Math Madness; Handheld LCD (1999); Re-released as Math Blaster Mission 3: Space Defenders; Windows, Mac (2000)
Math Blaster Cross Terrain Challenge: Ages 9–12	Windows, Macintosh (2001)
Math Blaster: Master the Basics	Windows, Mac (2006)
Math Blaster in the Prime Adventure	Nintendo DS (2008)
Math Blaster	iOS (2013)
Math Blaster HyperBlast	iOS (2013)
Math Blaster HyperBlast 2	iOS (2013): Re-released as Math Blaster HyperBlast 2 HD; iOS (2013)
Math Blaster Space Zapper	iOS (2013)
B-Force Blaster	iOS (2013)

=== Reading ===
Games	Platforms and release years
Reading Blaster: Invasion of the Word Snatchers	Windows, Macintosh (1994)
Reading Blaster 2000	Windows, Macintosh (1996): Re-released as Reading Blaster: Ages 6–9; Windows, Macintosh (1998); Re-released as Reading Blaster for 3rd Grade; Windows, Macintosh (1999); Re-released as Reading Blaster: Mel's Word Factory; Handheld LCD (1999)
Reading Blaster Jr.	Windows, Macintosh (1996): Re-released as Reading Blaster: Ages 4–6; Windows, Macintosh (1998)
Word Blaster	Windows, Macintosh (1996): Re-released as Reading Blaster: Vocabulary; Windows, Macintosh (1998); Re-released as Reading Blaster for 5th Grade; Windows, Macintosh (1999)
Reading Blaster: Ages 9–12	Windows, Macintosh (1998): Re-released as Reading Blaster for 4th Grade; Windows, Macintosh (1999)
Spelling Blaster	Windows, Macintosh (1999): Re-released as Reading Blaster for 2nd Grade; Windows, Macintosh (1999); Re-released as Reading Blaster: Word Planet; Handheld LCD (1999); Re-released as Reading Blaster Mission 3: The Secret Of Islandia; Windows, Macintosh (2000)
Reading Blaster for Kindergarten	Windows, Macintosh (1999): Re-released as Reading Blaster Mission 1: Secret Of the Sunken; Windows, Macintosh (2000)
Reading Blaster for 1st Grade	Windows, Macintosh (1999): Re-released as Reading Blaster Mission 2: Planet of the Lost Things; Windows, Macintosh (2000)

=== Other subjects ===
Games	Platforms and release years
Science Blaster Jr.	Windows, Macintosh (1996)
Writing Blaster: Ages 6–9	Windows, Macintosh (1998)

=== Compilations ===
Year	Title	Games
	Math Blaster Anniversary	Math Blaster: Ages 6–9; Spelling Blaster: Ages 6–9
	Blaster Learning System 3R's: Ages 4–6	Reading Blaster: Ages 4–6; KidWorks Deluxe; Math Blaster: Ages 4–6
	Blaster Learning System 3R's: Ages 6–9	Reading Blaster: Ages 6–9; Writing Blaster: Ages 6–9; Math Blaster: Ages 6–9
	Blaster Learning System 3R's: Ages 9–12	Reading Blaster: Ages 9–12; Multimedia Workshop; Math Blaster: Ages 9–12
2005	Math Blaster Game Pack: Ages 6–12	Math Blaster: Ages 6–9; Math Blaster: Ages 9–12; Math Blaster: Pre-Algebra; Math Blaster: Algebra

=== Other languages ===
Math:

- Swedish (titled "Matte Raketen")
- Finnish (titled "Matikkaraketti")
- Japanese (titled "算数戦士ブラスター(Sansū Senshi Burasutā)")

== Reception ==
The original game was praised by InfoWorld for its high resolution graphics, and considered it a standout title in the drill-and-practice edutainment video game genre. II Computing listed Math Blaster second on the magazine's list of top Apple II education software as of late 1985, based on sales and market-share data.

New Math Blaster Plus was reviewed in the Oppenheim Toy Portfolio Guide Book where it was praised for its "arcade-quality graphics [making] drills snappy and entertaining".

Math Blaster Episode I: In Search of Spot was rated as one of the top 100 CD-ROM games of 1994 in PC Magazine.

Math Blaster Mystery: The Great Brain Robbery was given a 4 out of 4 star rating by the Home PC magazine adding that "most games aren't educational AND fun, but Math Blaster Mystery is both".

By June 1997, the series sold 5 million copies.

After starting off with a huge boom and providing the base for the establishment of a successful public corporation, the Blaster series eventually fell victim to marketing cuts. In an attempt to sell both up and down the age group added more, Blasters were designed with increasingly thin, fuzzy and overlapping target age groups. Finally, the line came under fierce attack from the Gross brothers of Knowledge Adventure (now JumpStart), led by Barton Listic. Knowledge Adventure countered with a simple grade-based sub-division with their JumpStart logo. Eventually, Knowledge Adventure and Davidson were acquired by CUC International to form CUC Software, and the company lines were merged.
