= Animation Magic =

Russian-American software animation studio

Animation Magic Inc.
- Industry: video game industry
- Founded: 1991 (Massachusetts branch); 1992 (Saint Petersburg branch)
- Founders: Igor Razboff and Dale DeSharone
- Defunct: 2001
- Fate: Dissolved by Vivendi Universal
- Headquarters: Gaithersburg, Maryland, U.S.
- Number of locations: 3
- Products: Video games and animation
- Number of employees: ~150
- Parent: Capitol Multimedia (1994–1997); Davidson & Associates (1997–1998); Vivendi Universal Games (1998–2001)
- Subsidiaries: ООО "АМИ"

Animation Magic (Russian: Магия анимации, romanized: Magiya animatsii) was a Russian-American animation studio founded in Gaithersburg, Maryland in 1991, with offices later added in Cambridge, Massachusetts and a 100%-owned subsidiary in Saint Petersburg, Russia. The company developed animations for CD-based software. It was acquired in December 1994 by Capitol Multimedia. The assets and rights that Capitol owned would be sold to Davidson & Associates in April 1997.

By 1994, Animation Magic had 90 employees, including 12 software engineers and approximately 60 animators, computer graphic, background and sprite artists. Its video games included Link: The Faces of Evil, Zelda: The Wand of Gamelon, Mutant Rampage: Bodyslam, Pyramid Adventures, I.M. Meen, King's Quest VII: The Princeless Bride, Darby the Dragon, and the cancelled Warcraft Adventures: Lord of the Clans.

== Legacy ==
Circa 2006, Animation Magic video games were major source materials for YouTube poops, with the most notable being Link: The Faces of Evil, Zelda: The Wand of Gamelon, and I.M. Meen.

On September 6, 2020, over 200 animators collaborated to reanimate 21 minutes of cutscenes of Link: The Faces of Evil and Zelda: The Wand of Gamelon (both 1993).
