= Woogi World =

Online game for children

Woogi World was an educational multiplayer online game created by Children's Way, a non-profit organization that teaches children through various online educational programs, in 2008.

== Woogi World ==
Woogi World was a yearlong program in which elementary school students could become members of the Woogi World community. Woogi World aimed to teach children appropriate ways to socialize online, as well as skills for real-life situations, using gaming and social networking technology.

The program was free for participating schools due to philanthropist funding. The official national launch of Woogi World took place in 2008 and engaged over 50,000 elementary schools around the nation.

Woogi World members had online avatars as well as houses they could customize. They could also join clubs like music club, science club, and reading club.

Subjects taught included:

- Cyber Safety
- Woogi English
- Music
- Mathematics
- Science
- Reading

There was also a summer camp program.

=== Woogi English ===
The Woogi English program was designed to help students learn English as a second language. Various games taught English topics such as word contractions and pronunciation. Children could earn in-game rewards by leveling up in their lessons.

== "Every Kid Votes" ==
In 2008 Children's Way launched the "Every Kid Votes" campaign to encourage children to become aware of the rights and responsibilities of voting in the American political system. Children learn about the civic landscape and role of the government in society. Studies Weekly, academic classroom supplement, participated in the campaign along with eGuardian an online protection service.

In total, over 6 million children visited Woogi World before the November 2008 election to cast their mock vote.

== "WoogiReaders Club" ==
On November 18, 2008, the online WoogiReaders Club was launched as a platform to provide children access to great books. The club was created in collaboration with HarperCollins Children's Books, Walden Media, and Penguin Books.

Acceptance to the WoogiReaders Club is contingent on a child's completion of Woogi World's Internet Basic Training and the submission of one paragraph that explains why the child wants to join the club.

The WoogiReaders Club offers two types of membership: basic and upgraded. The basic membership offers online versions of classic children's stories to its users. Following the Woogi World game-oriented form, each chapter represents a level that the user can pass. This advancement is known as "leveling up."
