= Catch the Sperm =

2001 video game

- Splash screen
- Developer: Phenomedia AG CH
- Publishers: Phenomedia AG CH; Federal Office of Public Health
- Platforms: Personal computer, mobile telephone, cellular telephone
- Release: WW: 2001
- Genres: Edutainment, sports video game
- Modes: Single player, multiplayer

Catch the Sperm is a 2001 educational game developed and published by Phenomedia. It was recognized as an entertaining way for health professionals to promote prevention of HIV.

The original Catch the Sperm (now known as CTS Style I) is a 3.4-megabyte action game created in 2001 and updated in 2002 and 2003 by Phenomedia AG CH for UNICEF and the Swiss Federal Office of Public Health's Stop AIDS Campaign. The game can be played on personal computer, mobile telephone, or cellular telephone.

The game was designed for free international distribution. The art / IP is owned by Ingo Mesche who created all the game graphics for the versions 2001-2013

== Various versions ==
Catch the Sperm is available in seven versions:

- CTS Style 1 (2001)
- CTS Style 2 (2002)
- Duel (2003)
- Carnival (2003)
- Summer (2003)
- Swiss Soccer (2003)
- Christmas (2003).

Each version has its own theme, sperm characters, virus villains, and screen graphics, some of which seem to have been designed to parody the original images .

=== CTS Style 1 ===
The original Catch the Sperm (CTS Style 1) was created in 2001. It is set within the interior of a vagina or a rectum and the game commences amid orgasmic moans and groans. The characters are a Neutral Sperm, a Dual Techno Sperm, and a Precious Sperm. Various viruses are included as the villains.

=== CTS Style 2 ===
CTS Style 2 is a 2002 update of the original Catch the Sperm game. Set in a blue environment that is ambiguous enough that it could represent either the ocean depths or outer space, it features a Frozen Sperm, a Supersperm, a Fool Sperm, a Jungle Sperm, an I-Sperm, and a Jurassic Precious Sperm.

=== Carnival ===
The Carnival edition of Catch the Sperm is set against a background of what appears to be surreal paintings and includes drifting balloons and floating strands of confetti, some of which are spiral shaped like uncoiling DNA double helixes. The characters are a Waggis, a Joker, a Sambina, a Lipstick, a Clown, and Gold, Silver, and Bronze Sperm. There are six viruses.

=== Summer ===
The Summer edition of Catch the Sperm is set in a sunny Caribbean ocean of light blue water, flowering underwater plants, and bright sunshine. The characters are a Submarine, an Orca, a Swimmer, a Water, and a Diver Sperm. As with the Carnival edition, the Summer version also includes six viruses.

=== Christmas ===
The Christmas edition of Catch the Sperm is a winter landscape over which the sperm characters fly rather than swim. As they travel through the frosty night, they pass illuminated and decorated Christmas trees, lit candles, bows, and icicles. The characters are a Chocolate Sperm that resembles milk chocolate; a bearded Santa Claus Sperm wearing a red stocking hat with a white pompom and a red flannel body suit; a Cold Sperm wearing a blue-and-green stocking cap and matching earmuffs; a white Snowy Sperm wearing a black top hat; and a Wrapped Sperm that is decorated with a bright red bow.

== International versions ==
Catch the Sperm is available in many foreign language editions, including English, German, and Japanese.

== Object ==
To protect the couple who are having sex, the player shoots condoms from an imaginary gun that can be moved up or down along the right edge of the screen to align with oncoming threats. If the condoms find their targets, they snare sperm cells and the AIDS virus.

== Scoring ==
Players lose 50 points each time their sperm gun is fired, but players accumulate 100 points for snaring sperm cells, additional points for trapping viruses, and bonus points for snaring special sperm. At some point during play, the AIDS virus mutates, and play speeds up rapidly. The player may allow any number of sperm to slip past, although this will result in a lower score, but to allow even a single virus to speed past is to lose the game

== Winning ==
Upon successfully completing a game, players are rewarded with a special "Congratulations" screen before embarking on the next level of play. They can also visit an Internet web site where players can post their scores if they are among the highest of all other players. The world's top three players of the week receive a Catch the Sperm mouse pad inside of which mock sperm swim in a liquid.
