= Math for the Real World =

1997 video game

- Platform: Windows/Mac
- Release: May 20, 1997
- Genre: Educational

Math For The Real World is a 1997 educational video game published by Davidson and Associates and was intended to be the first in a "Real World" game series. On June 30, 1998, Davidson merged with the large educational software company Knowledge Adventure, with the new business becoming the publisher of the game in association with Kaplan Inc.

== Plot ==
The player manages a rock band and must secure funds to producing music videos and become successful by managing the budget efficiently. This is achieved by completing objectives like keeping on schedule and ensuring the van does not run out of fuel.

== Gameplay ==
The basic gameplay mechanics are as follows:

Math for the Real World presents a wide variety of real-life problems you could encounter as you tour the country with your band, such as creating schedules for sharing the driving, figuring out the perimeter of a poster in order to get it framed, or calculating the time it will take you to get from one place to another. Most of these are presented as word or story problems. The game provides a calculator and a handbook you can click on for hints (such as how many ounces are in a cup) or occasionally an actual strategy for solving the problem.

== Critical reception ==
Through The Glass Wall said "Math for the Real World does become long and the activities and math problems may not be diverse nor entertaining enough to promote prolonged play ... the real strength of this game in terms of engagement, is the video design area". SuperKids wrote "Math for the Real World shows kids that they DO use math everyday, and lets them succeed in using that math. And when learning and fun go hand in hand everyone goes away happy--in this case, however, they'll be back. "

The Deseret News said "the program is filled with a bunch of wacky characters and plenty of multimedia elements that may just fool kids into thinking math is actually fun". Toledo Blade described it as "entertaining and educational", and an example of a title that "can help a struggling student gain confidence".

One campus used the software "for motivating and challenging students to apply their mathematical skills". it noted that the enthusiasm by teachers, parents, and students was "contagious" - "even students who had previously disliked math were excited about seeking solutions to the mathematical problems the program generated".
