= I.M. Meen =

1995 video game

- Developer: Animation Magic
- Publishers: Simon & Schuster Interactive (United States); ABLAC Learning Works (United Kingdom)
- Producers: Dale DeSharone; Igor Razboff
- Designer: Matthew Sughrue
- Programmers: Kirill Agheev; Dima Barmenkov; Misha Chekmarev; Linde Dynneson; Misha Figurin; John O'Brien
- Artist: Masha Kolesnikova (character design)
- Writer: Matthew Sughrue
- Composer: Anthony Trippi
- Platform: DOS
- Release: NA: June 1995 October 1996 (re-release); UK: 1995
- Genres: Educational, first-person shooter, fantasy
- Mode: Single-player

I.M. Meen is a 1995 fantasy educational game for DOS to teach grammar to children. It is named for its villain, Ignatius Mortimer Meen, a "diabolical librarian" who lures young readers into an enchanted labyrinth and imprisons them with monsters and magic.

The goal of the game is to escape the labyrinth and free other children. This is accomplished by "shooting spiders and similar monsters" and deciphering grammatical mistakes in scrolls written by Meen.

The game was created by Russian-American company Animation Magic, which also animated the CD-i games Link: The Faces of Evil and Zelda: The Wand of Gamelon. Peter Berkrot provided the voices of I.M. Meen and his gnome henchman, Gnorris.

== Plot ==
Ignatius Mortimer Meen, an evil magician who despises children and learning, has created a magical book that sucks children inside when they read it, transporting them to a massive labyrinth, where they are found by monstrous guardians and locked into cells. Two of the prisoners named Scott and Katie are freed by one of I.M. Meen's gnome minions named Gnorris, who betrays his boss by tasking Scott and Katie with freeing the other captured children.

Scott and Katie venture throughout the labyrinth, defeating each of I.M. Meen's monster pets and rescuing the children, which causes the labyrinth's condition to rapidly deteriorate as Meen taunts them throughout their quest. The two eventually confront I.M. Meen himself and defeat him using Writewell's Book of Better Grammar, which was hidden in the labyrinth. In his defeat, Meen vows revenge before he flees the labyrinth as the game ends.

== Gameplay ==
The game contains 36 levels with nine locations, including a tower, a dungeon, sewers, caves, catacombs, hedgerow mazes, castles, laboratories, and libraries. The player must rescue all the children on each level to get to the next one, which is done by fixing grammar mistakes in various scrolls. In every fourth level, the player must defeat a boss monster, otherwise known as one of I.M. Meen's special pets, to advance to a new area. There are items in the labyrinth that can be used to help the player defeat the various monsters that dwell in the labyrinth, as well as help them out in other ways. The player has an Agility Meter, similar to a health meter that, when it runs out, takes the player back to the beginning of the level and removes all items collected on that level.

== Reception ==
Reception

Review score
Publication	Score
AllGame	2/5

Award
Publication	Award
Parents' Choice	Gold Award

The Contra Costa Times gave the game a positive review, calling it "the first computer game for young children to use the same fast 3-D graphics found in Doom" and praising it for its educational themes. Brad Cook of Allgame thought that the game's graphics and sound were well-executed, and thought that the game was well-developed for its time, but concluded his review by saying, "Since this program set out first and foremost to be an educational product, I'll have to give it a low mark because it simply fails to do that, despite how well-done the rest of it is" and gave the game two stars out of five.

== Legacy ==
A 1996 sequel to the game was made, titled Chill Manor, featuring a story about I.M. Meen's presumed wife, Ophelia Chill, who obtains the Book of Ages and tears out all the pages, allowing her to rewrite history. Meen appears at the game's ending to rescue Ophelia after she is tied to a chair. I.M. Meen, as well as Sonic's Schoolhouse and 3D Dinosaur Adventure: Save the Dinosaurs, has been named as one of the "creepy, bad" inspirations for the indie game Baldi's Basics in Education and Learning.

Beginning circa 2007, I.M. Meen's animated cutscenes became a major source material for YouTube Poops, among cutscenes from Hotel Mario and other Animation Magic games including Link: The Faces of Evil and Zelda: The Wand of Gamelon.
