= Spongelab Interactive =

Educational website

- Company type: online eLearning
- Founded: 2007
- Headquarters: Toronto, Ontario, Canada
- Area served: online
- Founders: Jeremy Friedberg, Reg Bronskill and Andrea Bielecki
- Website: https://www.spongelab.com
- Registration: Not required
- Current status: Active

Spongelab is a science education website for teachers and students created by Spongelab Interactive. The website provides a free online collection of multimedia including educational games, videos, images, and lesson plans, with a focus on game-based learning. Spongelab.com is a web-based teaching platform that allows educators to combine science, discovery learning tools and technology to create a visually engaging interactive whole. The website is a self-described “global science community” that has seen its base grow to more than 50,000 active monthly users. It stitches together interactive multimedia, online teaching and classroom metrics. Users gain points and credits for exploring the website, which can be used to unlock access to discounts for science education products.

== Platform description ==
Spongelab.com, is a web-based education platform specializing in playing science-based games and teaching students about STEM fields topics. Teachers can access the website and create lesson plans for their classes. Students can learn through the various animations, games, graphics and simulations while achieving credits, levels and badges to redeem for Spongelab avatars. The website also can be used to track the results of online learning through analytics.

== Spongelab Games ==
Knowledge Mine combines trivia with puzzles to reward players’ knowledge of biology. This game is intended for high school and post secondary students who are currently studying in STEM fields. Players must navigate through knowledge mines while answering questions boosting their score to new levels.

Build-a-Body is an interactive game where 8th-12th graders play transplant surgeon. Students drag and drop organs into place on the human body. They score points for correctly placing the organs and figuring out what part of the body they connect to. Build-a-Body also incorporates various illnesses for players to diagnose and for them to target and decide those systems. This game received a Honourable Mention in the International Science & Engineering Visualization Challenge - Interactive Games section 2011.

Genomics Digital Lab is an interactive simulation and engaging game that focuses on problem solving and the basics of biology. In one mode, the player learns what a leaf needs to survive by adjusting a plant's light, liquid and air intake. A glycolysis game has players fire an arcade-like shooter at glucose blobs to convert them and turn them into energy. Life of a Plant was the first version of Genomics Digital Lab in 2007. In a study conducted and published, "In total, 161 participants played a series of games focused on the “life of a plant”, and were given both a pre and post quiz to determine if the game helped them retain and/or change what they knew about scientific processes like plant cell anatomy and photosynthesis. Participants showed statistically significant improvement on quizzes that were taken after playing the game for approximately one-hour sessions."

Transcription Hero is a game that is inspired by the popular Guitar Hero series. You play the role of RNA polymerase (the enzyme responsible for DNA transcription). As the DNA sequence scrolls towards the player on the screen, the player will need to transcribe it by pressing the corresponding keys on the guitar.

History of Biology (video game) is a browser based scavenger hunt style educational game. Players must also make use of the Internet to scavenge additional information required. Students learn about the key figures and discoveries throughout history which have influenced the field of science. The game leads players to discover the impact of these people and events on today's society, ethics, politics and culture.
