= Arminda Schutte =

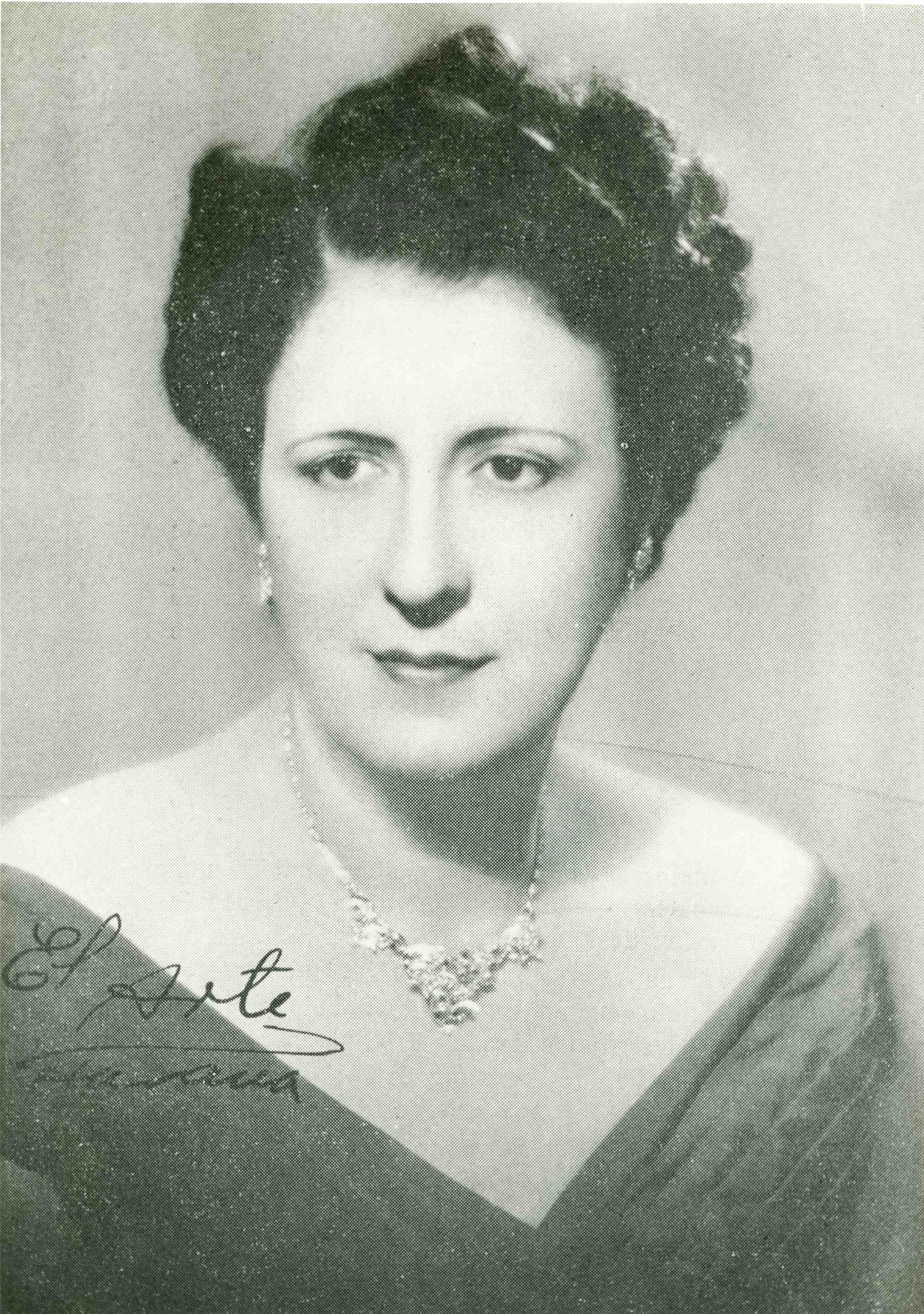
- Schutte
- Born: October 9, 1909; Matanzas, Cuba
- Died: May 5, 1995 (aged 85); Miami, Florida
- Musical career
- Occupation: Musician
- Instrument: Piano

Arminda Schutte (October 9, 1909 – May 5, 1995) was a Cuban classical pianist and pedagogue.

== Life ==
=== Early life and training ===
Schutte was born in the farm of La Merced located near Matanzas City, Cuba, to a well-educated high middle-class family. Her father, Julio Schutte, was of French origin and insisted that when at home the family would speak only French; this would prove to be invaluable later. Her Cuban mother, Ondina Visiedo, had a teaching (‘Magisterio’) degree. Schutte's mother was strongly determined to see her three children excel in life. Schutte's two brothers grew to become physicians prominent both in Cuba and in Pan-American medical societies. When the young Arminda displayed a talent for piano, her parents made certain she would receive the best instruction. Her early piano teachers included Flora Mora, a pupil of Enrique Granados. Schutte studied at the Municipal Conservatory of Havana and debuted in 1928, performing the Tchaikovsky Piano Concerto No.1 with the Symphonic Orchestra of Havana directed by Gonzalo Roig.

=== Professional life in Cuba and emigration ===
The following six years included frequent performances as soloist with the Symphonic Orchestra, and as recitalist at venues such as the National Academy of Arts and Letters, Liceo and Ateneo de Matanzas, the Medical Federation of Cuba, and other prestigious cultural societies throughout the island. In 1936 she performed the first ever open-air concert in Cuba, having been presented as soloist with the Symphonic Orchestra in the National Amphitheatre by the Department of Culture of the municipality of Havana. Though obviously a successful performer, a chance encounter at about this time with the great Russian cellist Gregor Piatigorsky resulted in a challenge for her to pursue a higher degree of technical mastery with the suggestion that she study in New York City with the incomparable Josef Lhévinne. In 1937 she left Cuba for New York City where she would spend the better part of four years studying with Mr. Lhévinne and, on occasions, with Madame Rosina Lhévinne as well. Lessons were conducted in French, as they knew no Spanish and at the time she knew little English. Shortly after arriving in New York, she debuted on October 28, inaugurating the concert season of the Pan-American Center Society. Afterwards she received an invitation from Columbia University to present a concert in their Institute of Spanish Studies. She then performed in General Electric's radio show broadcast (WGY) from Schenectady, New York, where she performed the Piano Concerto No. 1 in B flat major, Op. 16, by Sergei Bortkiewicz, her favorite concerto. Upon her return to Cuba in 1941, she founded in the Vedado district of Havana the Instituto de Arte Musical, Arminda Schutte, which received national academic accreditation by the Ministry of Education for the conferral of degrees, certificates and diplomas. She continued performing and teaching, eventually serving as Inspector of Music for the Ministry of Education. Given the arrival of Communism in the island, she left Cuba in 1963 with her widowed mother via Mexico with the goal of seeking political asylum in the United States. She left behind all but a few scores that she brought with her.

=== Life in the United States and demise ===
After a short stay in Mexico City, Schutte and her mother settled in Miami, Florida, near her younger brother, José Antonio and his family. (Her older brother, Julio, had died in 1961.) This was a difficult family period, with her younger brother dying in 1965 and her mother dying in 1966. She first stayed with family, but subsequently Schutte moved out on her own, purchased a small home, studied English, and began teaching private lessons, depending initially on her reputation within the large Cuban community.

She was appointed as adjunct faculty member at the University of Miami (Coral Gables), Florida International University, and Miami-Dade Community College. In the span of 16 months, from November 1969 to March 1971, she presented three acclaimed solo recitals at the University of Miami, including an all-Schumann recital (her avowed favorite composer). In 1980, at the age of 71, she again performed the demanding Bortkiewicz Piano Concerto No. 1 in B flat major in a two-piano recital with Victor de Diego at Florida International University. She died on May 5, 1995, in Miami, Florida, at the age of 85. She was one of the most notable pianists of Cuba.

== Artistry and repertoire ==
Schutte's art was characterized by a transcendental pianistic technique that was commanding, efficient, without hint of affectation or flamboyance, and wedded to a high talent of interpretation as well as to a broad, solid and highly refined cultural education. Her repertoire was decidedly Common practice period in scope, including all the major exponents of the Baroque (especially J.S. Bach), Classical and Romantic periods. (She never performed the piano concerto of her favorite composer, Robert Schumann.) Of the 20th century she accepted mostly only Debussy, Ravel, Granados and other Latin composers, as well as Rachmaninoff and some Scriabin, but eschewed both the dodecaphony of the Second Viennese School and the secondal harmony of the mature-styled Bartók. One of her signature encores was the delightfully picturesque “The Musical Box” by Immanuel Liebich.

== Pedagogy ==
Schutte administered a thorough theoretical grounding to her pupils and used Théorie de la Musique by A. Danhauser as a framework, supplemented by other intervallic, scalar and harmonic studies. Pupils were also trained in the European tradition of fixed-do Solfège (still used at The Juilliard School and at the Curtis Institute) for application in sight-singing and transposition at sight. The principles of the Russian school of technique as received from the Lhévinnes was taught, from the most fundamental posture, shape and movements of the hands, fingers and wrist, to the most advanced aspects using a systematic review of mechanical exercises (Schmitt, Isidor Philipp, Theodor Kullak, Hermann Berens, Ignaz Moscheles), and études (Carl Czerny, Cramer, Muzio Clementi, Chopin and others). Repertoire and principles of interpretation were built about the foursome of J.S. Bach, Classical sonatas, Romantic literature, and 20th century works. Her knowledge of the literature was thorough and she was known to call out corrected notes with ease from across the studio or from an adjoining room inside her home. Some of her US students achieved such recognition as national and world-wide awards for composition, including awards such as those earned by Armando Tranquilino, and performances on local television and radio, acceptances to The Juilliard School and the graduate divisions of Indiana University and the College-Conservatory of Music of the University of Cincinnati, and subsequent faculty positions in colleges, universities and the New World School of the Arts.
