= Pax Warrior =

- Developer(s): 23 YYZee
- Designer(s): Andreas Ua’Siaghail
- Platform(s): PC
- Genre(s): Strategy video game
- Mode(s): Single player

Pax Warrior is an educational computer game based on the United Nations’ experience during the Rwandan genocide. The game was developed by 23 YYZee studios, located in Toronto, Canada.

== Overview ==
The game is played from the viewpoint of a U.N. commander, and tasks the player with keeping the peace by making decisions during the Rwandan genocide. The game has been licensed to schools and incorporated into curriculums throughout Canada, Great Britain and South Africa.
