= Darby the Dragon =

1996 video game

- CD cover art
- Developer: Capitol Multimedia
- Publisher: Broderbund
- Directors: Timothy R. Phillips; Larissa Shabasheva
- Producer: Dale Desharone
- Writer: Andy Wolfendon
- Composer: Tony Trippi
- Series: StoryQuests
- Engine: Magic Composer
- Platforms: Windows, Macintosh
- Release: NA: August 4, 1996
- Genre: Graphic adventure
- Mode: Single-player

Darby the Dragon is a children's video game developed by Capitol Multimedia and published by Broderbund in 1996 for Macintosh and Microsoft Windows.

== Summary ==
This game follows two young dragons, Darby and his sister Sparkle (who has been shrunk), on a quest to find the ingredients of a potion that will "make Sparkle big again". This game is full of puzzles and allows children to solve problems in order to complete tasks. There are songs throughout the game that are both key to some of the puzzles, such as clues, and some are just for fun.
