= Genomics Digital Lab =

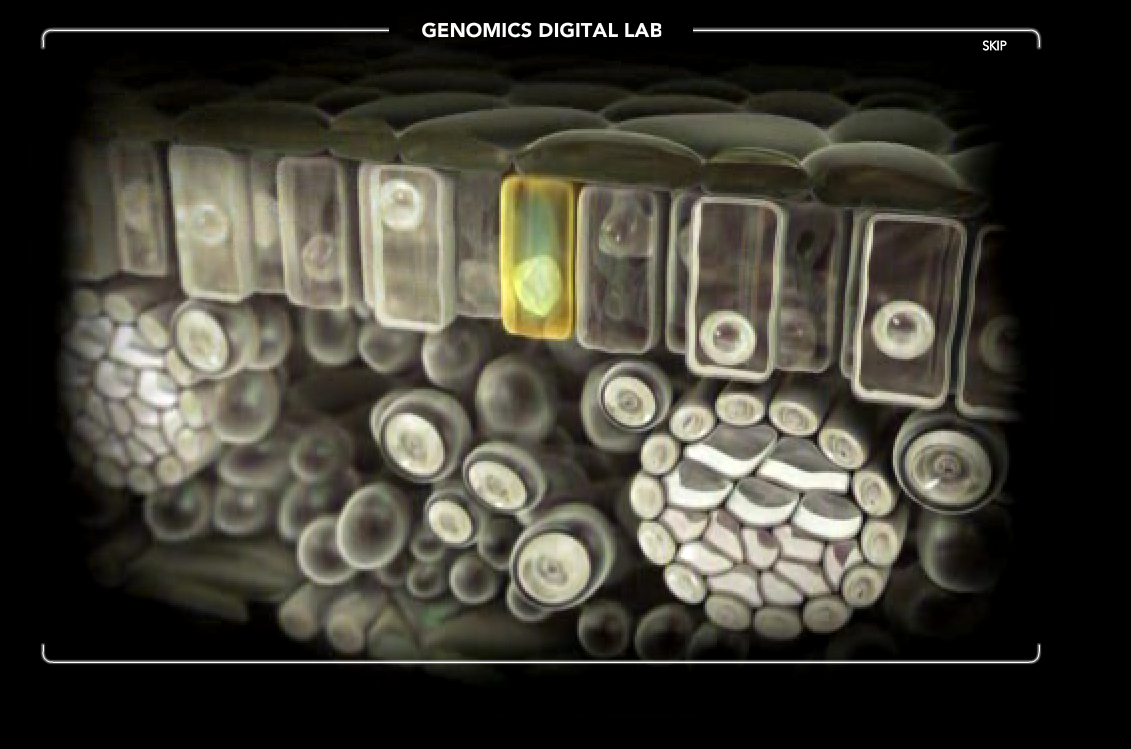
- Developer(s): Spongelab Interactive
- Publisher(s): Spongelab Interactive
- Platform(s): Windows, Mac OS X
- Release: 2009
- Genre(s): Educational
- Mode(s): Single player Online

Genomics Digital Lab (GDL) is a browser-based series of educational games, simulations, and animations created by Spongelab Interactive. It is designed to teach high school students about biology including photosynthesis, respiration, transcription, and translation. Genomics Digital Lab was released in 2009 and is available for purchase at home or school, or as a free 7-day trial.

== Game play ==
The user takes on the mission to save a dying plant. This is first done in the introductory level, where the user must identify the correct light, gas, and liquid conditions to make a plant thrive and survive.

In the intermediate level, the user enters each of the organelles (chloroplast, mitochondrion, and nucleus) where they must pass a variety of challenges. Each lesson has 3-4 levels, each starting with a tutorial, then getting progressively harder. In Lesson 2, the user is taken to the chloroplast where their goal is to make sugar using CO_{2} and sunlight by playing the Light Reaction and Calvin Cycle games. In Lesson 3, the user is in the mitochondrion, where they have to convert the sugar into energy by playing the Glycolysis, Citric Acid Cycle, and Electron Transport Chain games. Finally, in Lesson 4, the user is in the nucleus, where they use the energy to build proteins by playing the Transcription and Translation games. Once a user completes all 8 games, they become a Master of the Cell.

The Advanced Level consists of 5 text-based cases on real-world science topics.

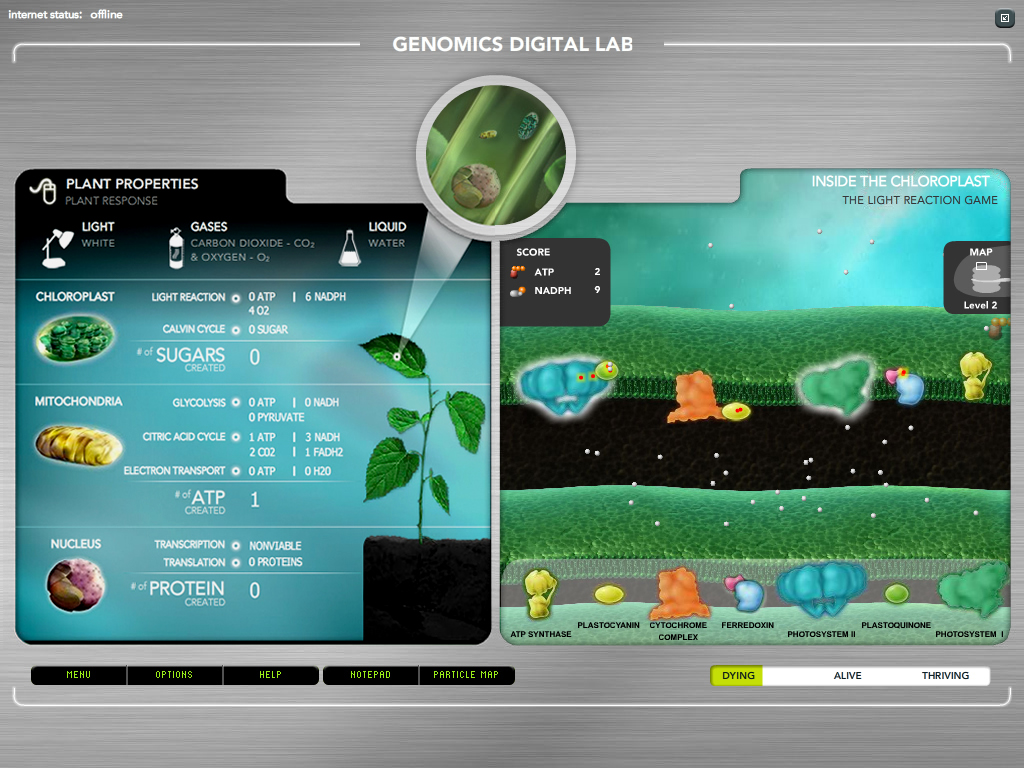
The light reaction game

== Scoring ==
In each game, points are awarded in the biological currency relevant to that game. Both the current score and the overall high score (in a number of sugars, ATP, or proteins) are recorded.

== Additional educational features ==
- Plant Anatomy Explorer - includes whole plant anatomy, leaf structure, leaf tissue structure, plant cells, and major cell organelles
- Particle Map - a glossary of all the molecules, indexed by their organelle location with a brief description
- Notepad - online notebook where students can record their observations
- Available in English and French
- Compatible with digital whiteboards

== Supportive features for teachers ==
Genomics Digital Lab was designed to be easily used in the classroom and provides teachers with lesson plans, curriculum alignments, quizzes, worksheets. Teachers can also monitor their students’ progress online, in real-time.

== Reception ==
Genomics Digital Lab won first place in the Interactive Media category in both the 2008 and 2009 National Science Foundation's International Science and Engineering Visualization Challenge , . It was also published in the September 26, 2008 issue of Science and the February 19, 2010 issue of Science .

In 2009, Genomics Digital Lab was awarded a World Summit Award for best e-content in the e-Science and Technology category as well as a Parents' Choice Award and an Adobe Max Honorable Mention in the Education category

== In the news ==
- Tran, Lisa (2009-10-19). "Playing the Biology". Teach Magazine. Archived from the original on 2010-04-25.
- Hutchison, Bill (2009-10-03). "webMANIA - Teaching to a video game generation". CTV News.
- Rainford, Lisa (2009-09-21). "Gaming company experiments at making science fun". Inside Toronto. Archived from the original on 2011-07-19.
- Bernard, Sophie (2009-07-29). "La biologie est un jeu d'enfant, avec le Labo Digital de Génomique". Le Lien Multimédia.
- Cowan, Danny (2009-07-07). "Genomics Digital Lab Uses Gaming to Teach Biology". Serious Games Source.
- Proudfoot, Shannon (2009-05-03). "Video games evolving as serious educational tools". Calgary Herald.
- McNeely, Sean (2008-10-27). "New interactive video game gets students excited about plant biology". Backbone Magazine. Archived from the original on 2011-07-20.
- Wurster, Paul (2008-07-02). "Have Some Fun in NECC Playgrounds" (PDF). L&L Daily Leader.
