= Dread Dragon Droom =

1985 video game

- Title screen
- Developer: HUMMEC
- Publisher: HUMMEC
- Designer: Derek Allen 1944- March 6th 2005
- Platforms: BBC Micro, Acorn Archimedes, Risc PC
- Release: 1985
- Genre: Educational
- Mode: Single-player

Dread Dragon Droom (known as Droom) is an educational game by HUMMEC (Humberside Microelectronics in Education Centre), 1985.

Widely used in UK schools in the 1980s, it was among the first British educational titles made for schools. HUMMEC was the educational support centre of the then LEAs of Humberside, part of a consortium (with Barnsley, Sheffield, Doncaster, Rotherham and, briefly, Wakefield) that ran RESOURCE, a regional centre in Doncaster.

== Plot ==
A classic fairy-tale fantasy: princess Arminda is held in the Dreaded Dragon Droom's dungeon, and her suitor Prince Henry has been turned into a frog. The player must rescue her, helped by a witch, a wizard, fairies and Little Bit. The game splits into chapters, each a mathematical, verbal, or logical puzzle. Chapters can be played alone, or the game run start to finish.

Though its structured, educational format made it highly linear, it stands out for varied puzzles, colourful graphics and a playful storyline.

== Development ==
Written by Derek Allen, an ICT-in-Education pioneer. After Droom he wrote "Albert's House", "Pond" and "Rainbow Stories", all sold via RESOURCE, plus the sequels "Dragon Droom's Revenge" and "Stardust" (early versions called "Dust"). Many remained available for PC from Resource Education, a private company in Derbyshire, which closed in mid-2015.
