= CODY Assessment =

Diagnostic screener for dyscalculia

- Developer(s): Kaasa health
- Initial release: December 1, 2013; 11 years ago
- Operating system: Microsoft Windows, OS X, iOS, Android
- Available in: 2 languages
- List of languages English, German
- Type: Psychological Testing
- Website: meistercody.com/en/page/science/

The CODY Assessment (Computer aided Dyscalculia test and training) is a diagnostic screener for elementary school children from 2nd to 4th grade used to determine math weakness or dyscalculia. It also generates a detailed report evaluating each child's mathematical skills. It was developed in 2013 as a part of the CODY Project, which partnered psychologists at the University of Münster with technology experts at Kaasa health, a German software company.

== Application ==
The CODY Assessment is part of the mathematical training software Meister Cody ‒ Talasia. Children take the assessment, which creates a detailed report evaluating their math skills, when they begin the program and again 30 days later. Additionally, the CODY Project used the assessment in its research with several elementary schools in order to evaluate the mathematical skills of children before and after various instructional/ intervention methods.

== Set-up ==
The CODY Assessment takes approximately 30–40 minutes and detects four aspects: core markers (dot enumeration & magnitude comparison), number processing, calculation and working memory skills. It's comprised several subtests (listed below), which evaluate both mathematical and cognitive skills:

- Reaction Time Test
- Dot enumeration
- Magnitude Comparison (symbolic and mixed)
- Transcoding
- Calculation
- Number Sets
- Number Line
- Matrix Span
- Missing Number

The subtests were inspired by the scientific findings of Brian Butterworth, who developed the background of a computer-based screening-test for detecting a dyscalculia.

== Validation ==
University of Münster validated the CODY Assessment. The validity and reliability of the test procedure were elaborately tested with a sample of more than 600 elementary school children from the second to fourth grade. The specificity of the CODY Assessment is 81 and the sensitivity is 76. The Ratz-Index is 0,68, which shows a good level of reliability.
