= Math Blaster! =

1983 video game

- Apple II cover art
- Developer(s): Davidson & Associates
- Publisher(s): Davidson & Associates
- Designer(s): Janice G. Davidson; Richard K Eckert Jr.
- Platform(s): Original; Apple II, Atari 8-bit, Commodore 64, IBM PC; Plus; Apple II, MS-DOS, Apple IIGS, Amiga; New Plus; MS-DOS, Windows
- Release: 1983 (Original); 1987 (Plus); 1990 (New Plus)
- Genre(s): Educational
- Mode(s): Single-player

Math Blaster! is a 1983 educational video game, and the first entry in the "Math Blaster" series within the Blaster Learning System created by Davidson & Associates. The game was developed by former educator Jan Davidson. It would be revised and ported to newer hardware and operating systems, with enhanced versions rebranded as Math Blaster Plus! (1987), followed by New Math Blaster Plus! (1990). A full redesign was done in 1993 as Math Blaster Episode I: In Search of Spot and again in 1996 as Mega Math Blaster.

The game spawned other Math Blaster titles including Math Blaster Jr. and Math Blaster Mystery: The Great Brain Robbery, as well as math-related spin-offs like Alge Blaster and Geometry Blaster, and forays into other subjects like Reading Blaster, Word Blaster, Spelling Blaster, and Science Blaster Jr.

== Gameplay ==
An arcade-style educational game that offers skill-building mathematical exercises, the title contains minigames that test players' knowledge in subjects such as addition, subtraction, multiplication, division, fractions, percentages, and decimals. A series of mathematics problems appear on the screen, and the player must move to fire the cannon pointing at the correct answer. The game included an editor for teachers and parents to design their own problems.

While this title was purely a drill and practice, its 1987 sequel would wrap the activity around a narrative.

== Educational goals ==
Math Blaster was designed to aid students to master first-to-sixth-grade mathematics in an exciting and interesting manner. The learning activities were advertised as graphically appealing and promised to motivate and challenge students.

== Reception ==
After it was developed, Math Blaster! was extensively tested in classrooms. By November 2, 1985, the game had sustained 92 weeks on the Billboard charts for Top Education Computing Software, and was placed at #2. The game, plus its various sequels and spin-offs, has since become the best-selling piece of math software in history.

InfoWorld praised the game for its high resolution graphics, and considered it a standout title in the drill-and-practice edutainment video game genre, and deemed it a perfect teacher's aid for primary school classroom use.

New Math Blaster Plus was reviewed in the Oppenheim Toy Portfolio Guide Book where it was praised for its "arcade-quality graphics [making] drills snappy and entertaining".

The game inspired a series of math problem-solving games that would become a popular series in the marketplace. Along with Reader Rabbit and The Oregon Trail, the game is considered a classic.
