= Davidson & Associates =

Defunct American developer of educational software

Davidson & Associates, Inc.
- Company type: Subsidiary
- Industry: Educational software/Edutainment
- Founded: 1982; 44 years ago
- Founders: Bob Davidson; Jan Davidson
- Defunct: 1998
- Fate: Dissolved
- Headquarters: Torrance, California, U.S.
- Key people: Jan Davidson (president; 1982–1997); Chris McLeod (Chief Executive Officer; 1997); Larry Gross (president; 1997–1999)
- Number of employees: 800 (1998; 28 years ago)
- Parent: Cendant Software (1996–1999)
- Subsidiaries: Blizzard Entertainment; Learningways; Funnybone Interactive

Davidson & Associates, Inc. was an American developer of educational software based in Torrance, California. The company was founded in 1982 by husband-and-wife Bob and Jan Davidson, the latter of whom led the company as president until January 1997. Specializing in the production of edutainment software, the company was acquired by CUC International in February 1996 and served as the base for CUC's CUC Software division, being made responsible for the sales and distribution of the combined company.

Davidson owned several studios, including Funnybone Interactive, Learningways, Capitol Multimedia, and Blizzard Entertainment. Other subsidiaries included First Byte, Maverick Software, Fas-Track and Educational Resources as well as Gryphon Software.

Davidson & Associates was known chiefly for their Blaster series of educational games, including Math Blaster as well as their licensed games based on the products of Fisher-Price.

== History ==
Davidson & Associates was founded in 1982 by Bob and Jan Davidson, husband and wife, to publish Jan's educational Software.

In 1989, Bob Davidson was named chief executive officer of the company, while Jan acted as company president. Jan headed the company's research and development, while Bob handled Davidson's marketing, sales and corporate strategy.

In May 1992, Davidson acquired Educational Resources, Ltd.

In April 1993, the company became publicly traded on the Nasdaq stock exchange under the ticker symbol "DAVD". By February 1994, sales generated by the company's software totaled to US$40 million.

On February 18, 1994, Davidson & Associates acquired Chaos Studios (later renamed Blizzard Entertainment), a Costa Mesa, California-based video game developer, in a stock deal valued $6.75 million; the acquisition was announced publicly the following month. In March 1994, Davidson acquired Learningways, an educational software firm from Cambridge, Massachusetts, for an undisclosed sum.

On April 12, 1994, Davidson entered into two agreements with Simon & Schuster to fund the development, marketing and distribution of titles for the home market. Davidson at this time also agreed to provide a minimum of $15 million of development services to Simon & Schuster over the five-year period of the agreement for the development of SimonSchuster's educational software for the school market.

In February 1995, Davidson acquired Funnybone Interactive, a developer of children's entertainment and educational software, headquartered in Canton, Connecticut.

By 1995, Davidson employed 327 people. By the time the company would be merged with Knowledge Adventure in 1998, it would employ over 800 people.

On April 13, 1995, the Company announced the formation of NewMedia, a value-added distributor of consumer multimedia software to the mass-merchant channel with toy manufacturer Mattel.

On February 21, 1996, CUC International announced that they had agreed into acquiring Davidson & Associates, alongside software publisher Sierra On-Line, for $1.8 billion in total.

On March 9, 1996, Davidson purchased Condor, Inc., which after acquisition was renamed to Blizzard North for 225,409 shares of Davidson Common Stock.

After the acquisition by CUC closed in July 1996, CUC International formed CUC Software around Davidson & Associates and its Torrance, California offices. Bob Davidson became chairman and chief executive of the new establishment while remaining chief executive officer of Davidson & Associates. Jan Davison remained as president of Davidson after the acquisition by CUC. Both would become members of CUC's board of directors, while Bob would also become a vice chairman of CUC.

On January 21, 1997, both Davidsons announced that they had resigned from their respective positions at CUC Software and Davidson & Associates to pursue personal interests, although both of them stayed part of the board of directors of CUC International.

Immediately following the Davidson' departure, Chris McLeod, the CEO of CUC Software, was placed in charge of Davidson & Associates as chief executive officer.

On April 16, 1997, Davidson purchased Animation Magic, the animation division of Capitol Multimedia, consisting of offices in Maryland and St. Petersburg, Russia, and retained the senior personnel of Capitol Multimedia and Animation Magic. This division was at the time was helping to develop Blizzard's ultimately cancelled Warcraft Adventures.

In June 1997, Davidson launched a new product line entitled Math For The Real World. The same month Davidson announced a new student aimed development line called Educast

By late 1997, Larry Gross, the CEO of Knowledge Adventure had been named as the President of Davidson & Associates and Davidson announced the release of Reading Blaster: Ages 9–12 in March 1998.

The products of Knowledge Adventure and Davidson were grouped together as being part of CUC Software's Educational Division, which Gross also headed.

By October 1998, the company's brand name was retired, and was merged with that of Knowledge Adventure.

Davidson's Math Blaster, Reading Blaster, Fisher-Price and Syracuse Learning product lines, as well as Sierra's Dr. Brain product line, were transferred to Knowledge Adventure. Control of Davidson's subsidiary studios such as Funnybone Interactive was also transferred to Knowledge Adventure, with the exception of Blizzard Entertainment, which became a separate division of Cendant Software.

By December 1998, Davidson's website would redirect to Knowledge Adventure's website, while the Torrance, California offices of Davidson & Associates would, as of 2001, continue to serve as the headquarters for Cendant Software's successor, Havas Interactive. Despite this, Davidson continued as a brand name for a time.

In April 1999, Havas Interactive announced a reorganization of its senior management structure, which included the dismissal of Larry Gross as president of Knowledge Adventure. By the end of 1999, the Davidson & Associates brand name had ceased to be.
