= Antonio Bartolomeo Bruni =

Italian composer

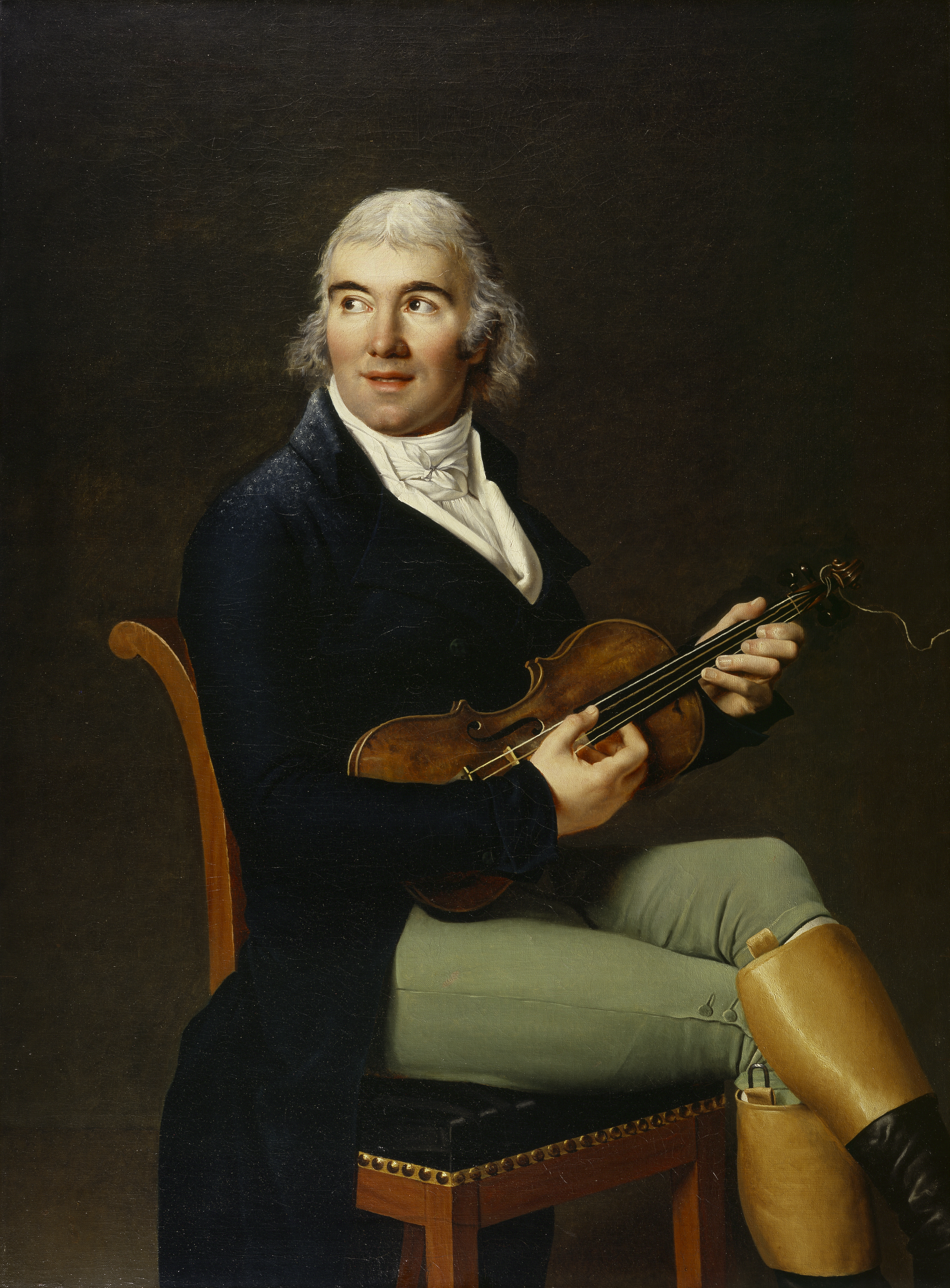
Portrait of Antonio Bartolomeo Bruni by Césarine Davin-Mirvault, circa 1804 (New York, The Frick Collection)

Antonio Bartolomeo Bruni (28 January 1757 – 6 August 1821) was an Italian violinist, composer and conductor. Bruni was born and died in Cuneo, Italy. During most of his life, he resided, played and composed in Paris.

At the height of the French 'terror', c.1791, Bruni authored Un Inventaire sous la terreur which lists musical instruments recovered from noble households. This inventory was published by J. Gallay, editor (Paris: Georges Chamerot, 1890). In the scholarly work The Hurdy-Gurdy in Eighteenth-Century France by Robert E. Green (Indiana University Press, 1995), where the Bruni text is footnoted, Green says of Bruni's inventory "from 111 noble households (it) lists six which possessed vielles (hurdy-gurdies)." p. 17. In the fictional novel The Piano Tuner by Daniel Mason this affair is again referred to thus: "A Temporary Commission of Arts was set up and ... Bruni ... was named Director of the Inventory. For fourteen months he collected the instruments of the condemned. In all, over three hundred were gathered, and each carries its own tragic tale." Mason goes on to say that 64 were pianofortes.

== Works ==
- Method for Viola followed by 25 Etudes
- Claudine, ou Le Petit Commissionnaire (1794)
- La rencontre en voyage (Comédie en un acte) (1798)
- L'auteur dans son ménage (Opéra-comique en un acte) (1799)
- 6 Concertant Trios for 2 Violins and Viola or Cello, Op.1
- 6 String Trios, Op.2
- 6 Duets for Violin and Viola Op.4
- 6 String Trios, Book 4 (Op.4)
- 6 Duets for Violin and Viola, Op.25
- 6 Duettini, Op.34
- 6 String Trios, Op.34
- 6 Trios for 2 Violins and Viola, Op.36 (La petite conversation)(6th Book of Trios)
- 6 duos concertants pour 2 altos,
- 6 Quatuors pour 2 Violons, Alto et Basse
- 6 String Quartets

== Discography ==
- Six Sonatas for viola op.27 (Dynamic 1997 - S2005)
- Six Duo Concertants for violin and viola (L'Orfeo Ensemble Di Spoleto - Mondo Musica 1999)
- 6 Duo Concertants, Book 4 (Natalia Lomeiko, Yuri Zhislin - Naxos 2011)
- 25 Etudes for Viola (World Premiere Recording) - Marco Misciagna, viola (MM12, 2024)
