= Sébastien Érard =

French harp and piano maker (1752 – 1831)

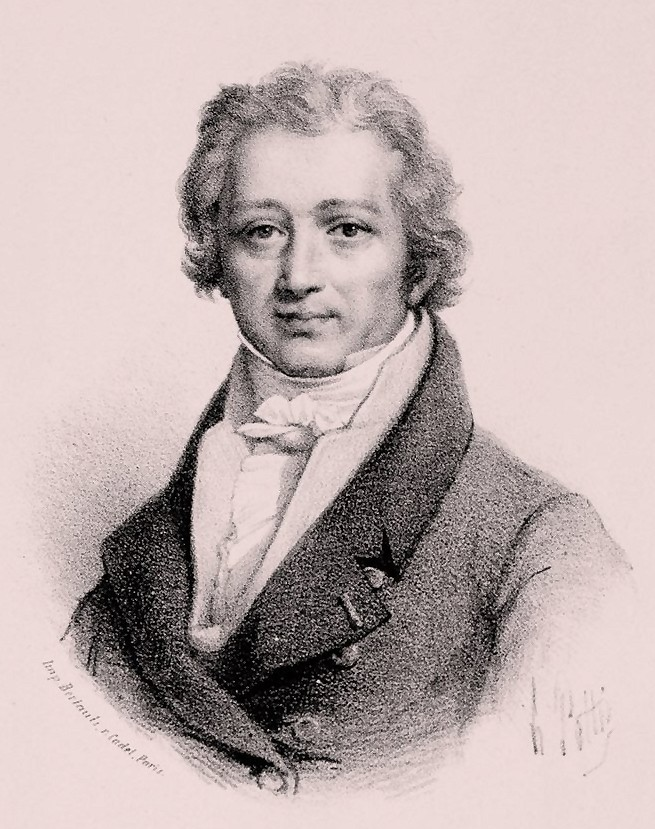
Sébastien Érard

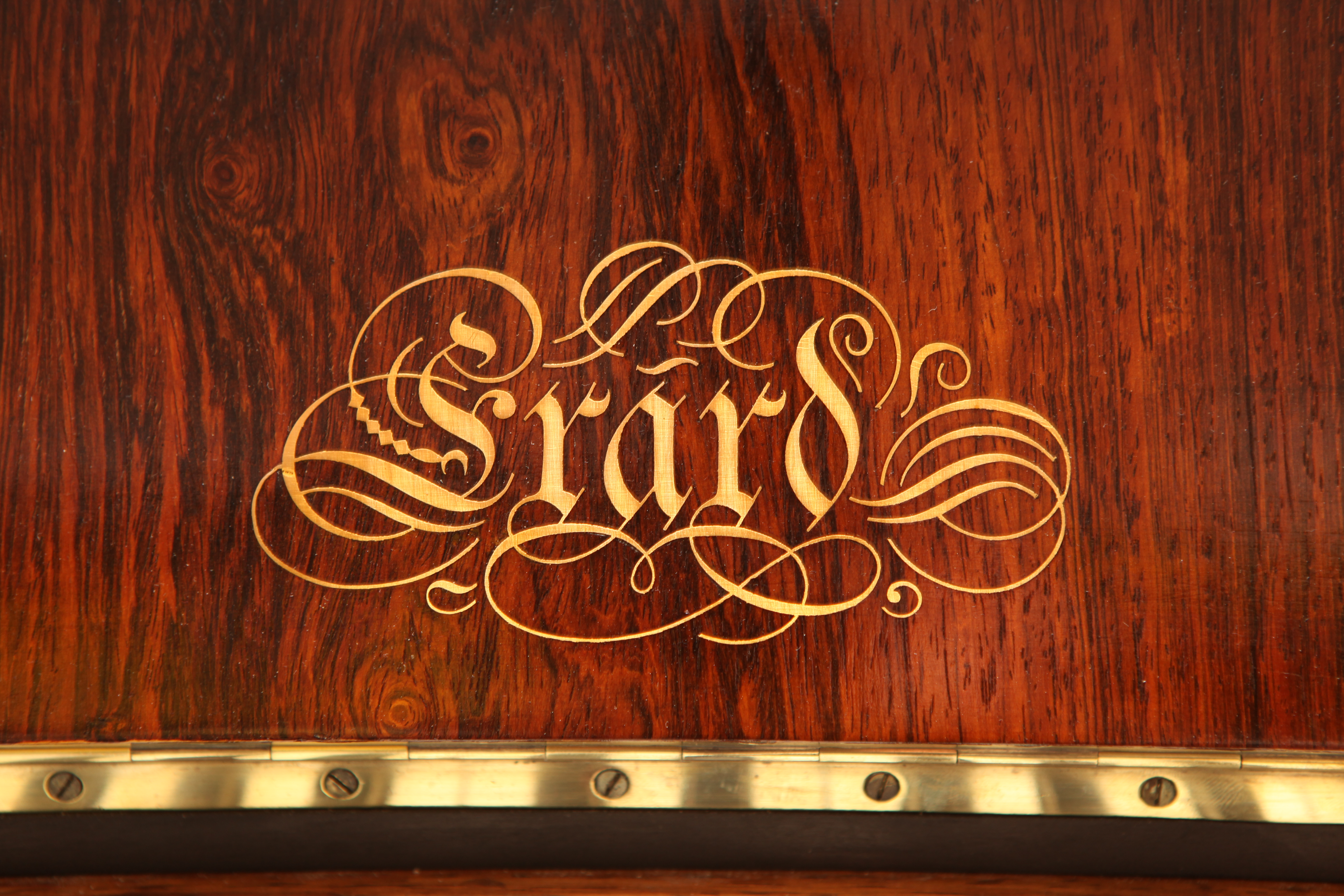
Érard piano

Sébastien Érard (French: [sebastjɛ̃ eʁaʁ]; 5 April 1752 – 5 August 1831) was a French instrument maker who specialised in the production of pianos and harps, developing the capacities of both instruments and pioneering the modern piano.

== Biography ==
Érard was born in Strasbourg. While a boy he showed great aptitude for practical geometry and architectural drawing, and in the workshop of his father, who was an upholsterer, he found opportunity for the early exercise of his mechanical ingenuity. When he was sixteen his father died, and he moved to Paris where he obtained employment with a harpsichord maker. Here his remarkable constructive skill, though it speedily excited the jealousy of his master and procured his dismissal, almost instantly attracted the notice of musicians and musical instrument makers of eminence.

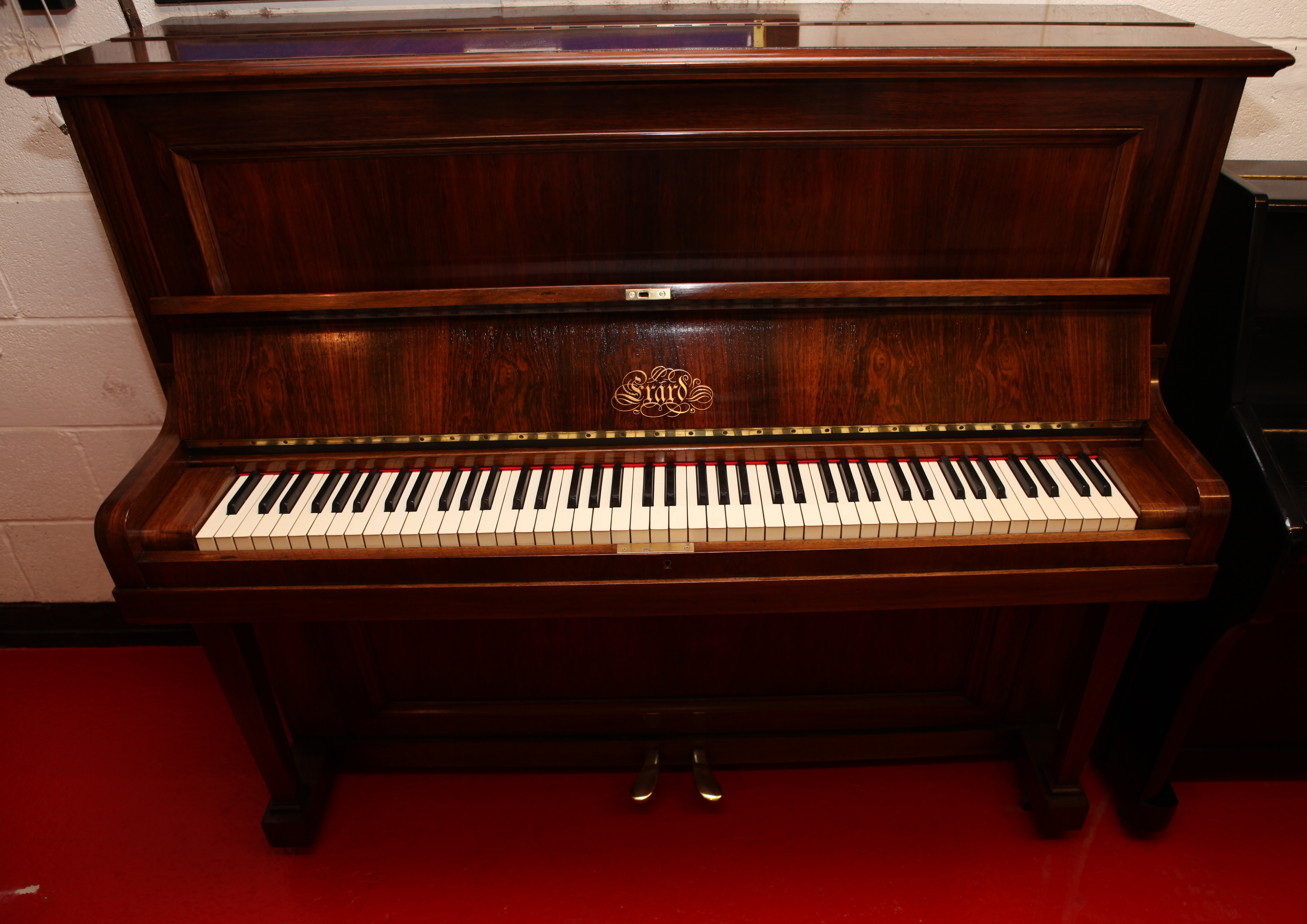
1914 Érard upright piano made in London

Before he was twenty-five he set up in business for himself, his first workshop being a room in the hotel of the duchesse de Villeroi, who gave him warm encouragement. He built his first pianoforte in 1777 in his Paris factory, relocating fifteen years later to premises in London's Great Marlborough Street to escape the French Revolution - his increasing fame and several commissions for the likes of Louis XVI and Marie Antoinette having placed him at risk.

Returning to Paris in 1796, he soon afterwards introduced grand pianofortes, made in the English fashion, with improvements of his own. In 1808 he again visited London, where, two years later, he produced his first double-movement harp. He had previously made various improvements in the manufacture of harps, but the new instrument was an immense advance upon anything he had before produced, and obtained such a reputation that for some time he devoted himself exclusively to its manufacture. It has been said that in the year following his invention he made harps to the value of £25,000. In 1812 he returned to Paris, and continued to devote himself to the further perfecting of the two instruments with which his name is associated. In 1823 he crowned his work by producing his model grand pianoforte with the double escapement. Érard died at Passy, located in the XVIe arrondissement on the Right Bank.

== Patents for the harp ==
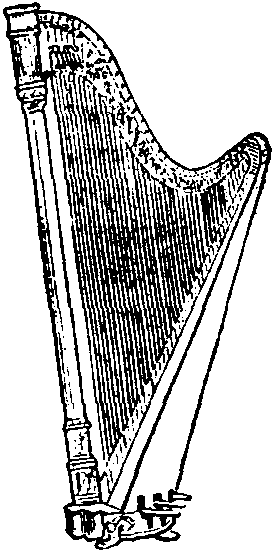
An Érard harp

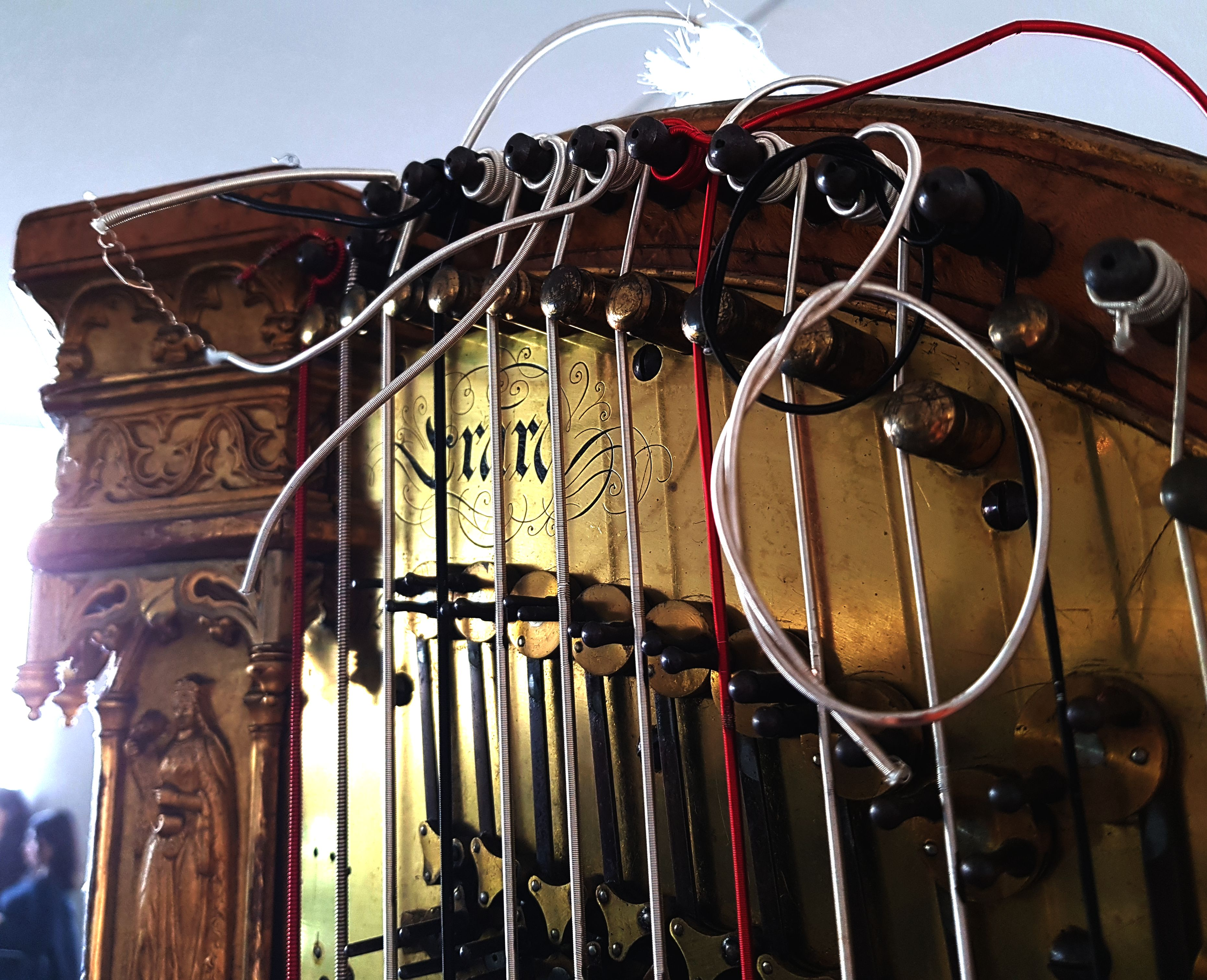
Erard harp mechanism

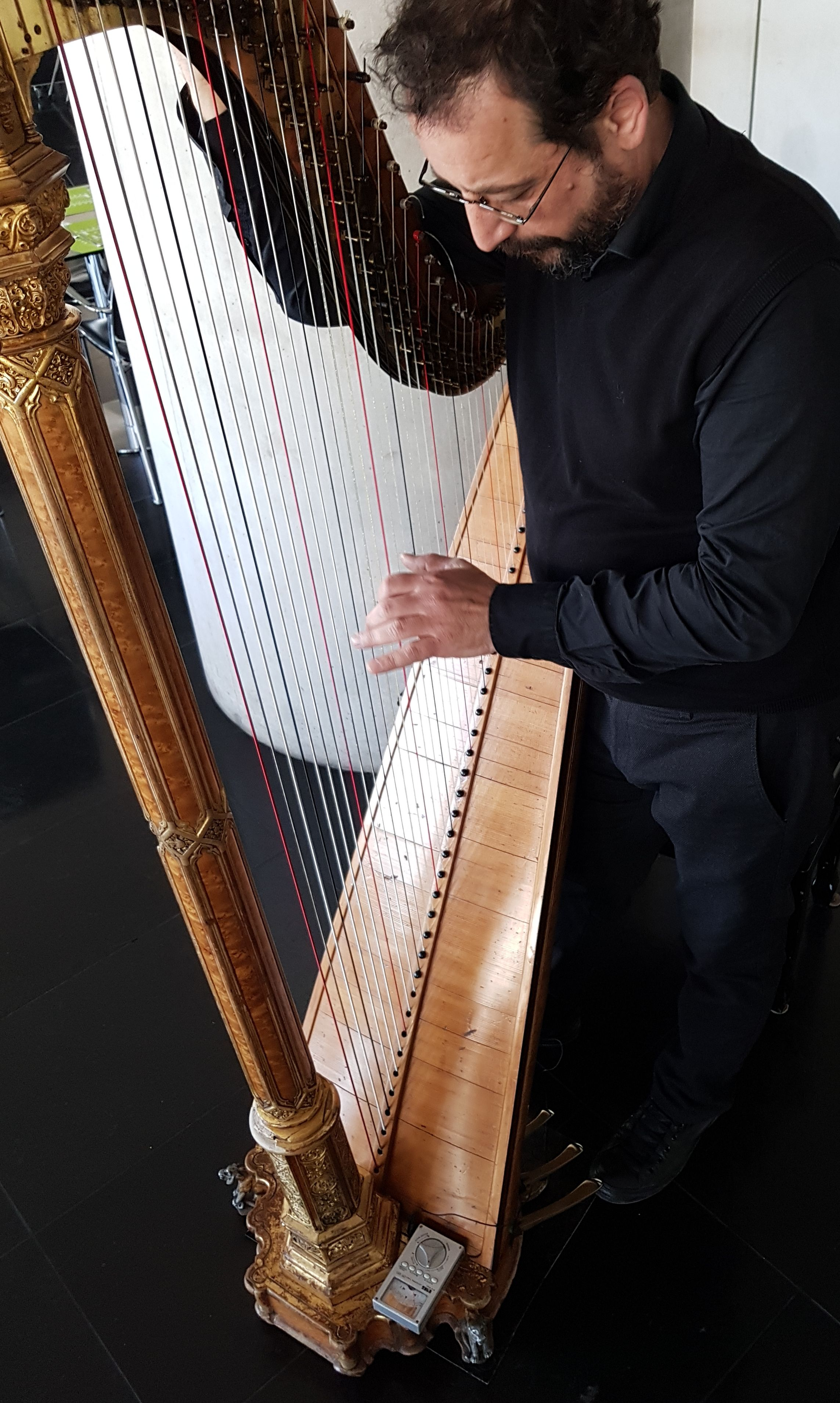
Tuning of Erard harp (using Korg OT-120 Wide 8 Octave Orchestral Digital Tuner)

In November 1794 Érard filed the first English patent for a harp (Improvements in Pianofortes and Harps, patent no. 2016), a greatly refined single-action instrument (tuned in E flat) that could be played in eight major and five minor keys thanks to its ingenious fork mechanism which allowed the strings to be shortened by a semitone.

Érard's "double movement" seven-pedal action for the harp (perfected and patented in the summer of 1810, Patent no 3332) allows each string to be shortened by one or two semitones, creating a whole tone. This mechanism, still used by modern pedal-harp makers, allows a harpist to perform in any key or chromatic setting. It was such a popular innovation that Érard sold £25,000-worth of harps in the first year of the release of the new instrument.

One of these harps can be seen in the Museum für Kunst und Gewerbe in Hamburg in Germany.

== Patents for the piano ==
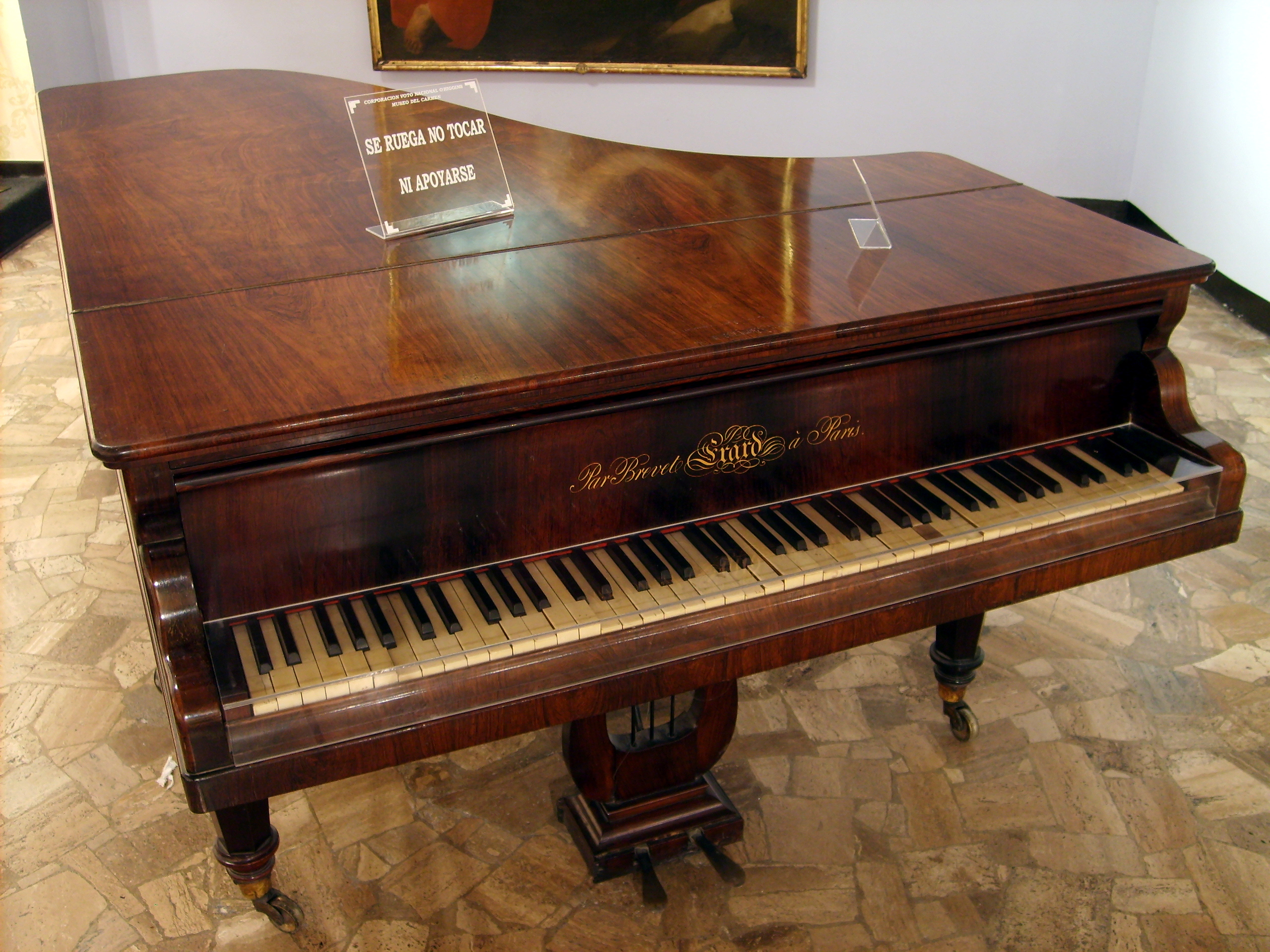
Andrés Bello's Érard piano in "Museo del Carmen de Maipú", Chile

Érard's grand piano action (English patent no 4,631, 1821) is the predecessor to those used in modern grands. The repetition lever in these "double escapement" actions allows notes to be repeated more easily than in single actions. It is just one of many Érard innovations still found on modern pianos - for example, Érard was the first maker in Paris to fit pedals on the piano, and his instrument had several pedals. There was the usual sustaining pedal, an action shift, a celeste, and a bassoon pedal (which put leather against the strings to make them buzz). A knee lever moved the action farther than the action-shift pedal, making the hammers strike only one string. Other Érard piano patents deal mainly with technicalities of the keyboard action, soundboard, and tuning mechanism; virtually all of these innovations are retained in modern piano design.

== Notable Érard artists ==
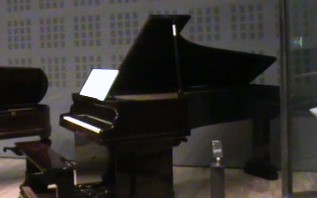
Alkan's Érard grand piano-pédalier, now in the Musée de la musique, Paris

Érard's pianos were also widely appreciated by the foremost musicians - Charles-Valentin Alkan, Beethoven, Chopin, Fauré, Haydn, Herz, Liszt, Mendelssohn, Moscheles, Clara Schumann, Wagner, Verdi and Ravel are just a few of the famous composers who owned Erard Pianos. Mid-career, Paderewski traveled on concert tours with his own Érard piano.

Franz Liszt is said to have played a six-octave Érard piano in Paris. Érard put him under contract from about this time until 1825, so when he toured England they sponsored him and he played their pianos.

In 2017, Daniel Barenboim unveiled a piano with straight-strung bass strings, inspired by Liszt's Érard piano and developed with the help of Chris Maene, who also built it. Barenboim appreciates its clarity of tone and greater control over the tonal quality (or color). In 2019, Barenboim performed on this piano in a concert with the Berlin Philharmonic Orchestra.

== In literature ==
The Érard Grand piano has been featured as part of the story line in The Piano Tuner by Daniel Mason. Men, Women and Pianos. A Social History by [Arthus Loesser], 1954 [Dover Publications] Pianos and their Makers, [Alfred Dolge] 1972, [Dover Publications], chapter 3, p. 251–4

In Flaubert's Madame Bovary, Emma gives up playing piano when she realizes that she will never be able to play a concert on a "piano d'Erard," which Francis Steegmuller [Penguin] translated as "grand piano" [French Wikisource page 88].

In Trollope's Barchester Towers, Archdeacon Grantly, in the concluding chapter, gifts an Erard piano to his new son-in-law.

== General references ==
- Grout/Palisca, A History of Western Music (4th Ed.)
- A History of Sébastien Erard at UK-piano.org
