= Peter Buchman =

American screenwriter

Peter Buchman (born July 13, 1967) is an American screenwriter. His writing credits include the screenplays for Jurassic Park III.

In 2001, Buchman and Christopher McQuarrie wrote a screenplay for a biopic of Alexander the Great that was to star Leonardo DiCaprio and be directed by Martin Scorsese, however, the project did not materialise. In 2003, he was working on a TV series about the Kennedy family.

== Filmography ==
- Jurassic Park III (2001) (screenplay)
- Eragon (2006) (screenplay)
- Che: Part One (2008) (screenplay)
- Che: Part Two (2008) (screenplay)
- The Foreigner (2017) (screenplay)
- The Piano Tuner (TBA) (screenplay)
