= Winter Soldier =

Winter Soldier or Winter Soldiers may refer to:

== Politics ==
- Winter Soldier Investigation, a 1971 inquiry into American war crimes during the Vietnam War
  - Winter Soldier (film), a 1972 documentary film chronicling the 1971 Winter Soldier Investigation
- Winter Soldier: Iraq & Afghanistan, a 2008 inquiry into American war crimes during the wars in Iraq and Afghanistan

== Arts and entertainment ==
=== Comic books ===
- Winter Soldier (comics) or Bucky Barnes, a Marvel Comics superhero
  - The Winter Soldier (story arc), 2005 story arc establishing the character
  - Winter Soldier (Marvel Cinematic Universe), live-action adaption of the character
  - Captain America: The Winter Soldier, a 2014 superhero film based on the Marvel Comics characters
  - The Falcon and the Winter Soldier, a 2021 superhero television series based on Marvel Comics characters
  - Marvel Zombies: The Winter Soldier, a 2027 two-part television special based on the Marvel Comics character

=== Other ===
- The Winter Soldier, a 2016 film originally titled 2307: Winter's Dream
- The Winter Soldier (novel), a novel by Daniel Mason
- Winter Soldiers, a 1943 play by Daniel Lewis James
