= Sara Houghteling =

American novelist and educator (born 1977)

- Born: 1977 (age 48–49)
- Education: Harvard College; University of Michigan (MFA)
- Occupation: Educator
- Writing career
- Language: English
- Period: WWII
- Genre: Historical fiction
- Notable awards: First prize, Avery and Jules Hopwood Awards, John Steinbeck Fellowship
- Website: www.sarahoughteling.com

Sara Houghteling (born 1977) is an American novelist and educator.

== Biography ==
She was born in 1977 and graduated from Harvard magna cum laude in 1999. She received her Master's in Fine Arts in creative writing from the University of Michigan in 2003. She received a Fulbright scholarship to Paris, first prize in the Avery Jules Hopwood Novel Contest, and a John Steinbeck fellowship. She taught high school English at Marin Academy. In 2009, she became engaged to fellow Harvard alumnus and writer Daniel Mason, author of The Piano Tuner and A Far Country. After focusing on lost art looted during World War II for her first novel, she is currently writing her second book on a pianist searching for Hindemith's lost piano concerto after ruining his right hand practicing Brahms' Piano Concerto in B-Flat Major.

== Pictures at an Exhibition ==
Houghteling's first novel, Pictures at an Exhibition, was published in 2009 by Alfred A. Knopf. It won the Edward Lewis Wallant Award and has also been released as an audio book, read by Mark Bramhall.
