= Jurassic Park III: Danger Zone! =

2001 video game

- Developer: Knowledge Adventure
- Publisher: Knowledge Adventure
- Series: Jurassic Park
- Platform: Microsoft Windows
- Release: July 20, 2001
- Genres: Action, Adventure
- Modes: Single player, Multiplayer

Jurassic Park III: Danger Zone! is a 2001 video game developed and published by Knowledge Adventure for Microsoft Windows. It is based on the 2001 film Jurassic Park III. Gameplay consists of the player(s) going around on a virtual board game map. Knowledge Adventure also concurrently developed and published Jurassic Park III: Dino Defender. Certain aspects of Dino Defender were re-used for Danger Zone!.

== Gameplay ==
InGen's supply of dinosaur DNA is nearly destroyed after an earthquake comes to Jurassic Park. As in Jurassic Park III: Dino Defender, the player is again cast as a Dino Defender. The player must go to Jurassic Park to retrieve new DNA samples. The game includes a multiplayer for up to 2 players. The Dino Defender Chief, a character who serves as both an authority figure and narrator, returns from the previous game to guide the player through menus. Danger Zone! also recycles several cutscenes, menu designs, animations, and audio from Jurassic Park III: Dino Defender.

In the game the tokens are SUVs. The player goes around Jurassic Park on a board-like version of it. The player's mission is to collect four DNA samples from a dinosaur chosen at the start of the game. Dinosaurs include T. rex, Spinosaurus, Brachiosaurus, Compsognathus, Pteranodon, Velociraptor, and Stegosaurus. The player can buy items, which can be used against dinosaurs.

Jurassic Park III: Danger Zone! features a variety of diverse mini-games. Many mini-games are side-scrolling games that feature the same armored character used in Dino Defender. Other mini-games such as "Raging Raptors" involves the player controlling a raptor and fighting another raptor, or hunting in a field to obtain DNA of dinosaurs using a helicopter. When the player has filled the "DNA meter" with the DNA of the chosen dinosaur, the creature is then cloned and the player wins the game.

== Reception ==
Reception

Review scores
Publication	Score
GameZone	6/10
The Electric Playground	7/10
USA Today	4/5

Christy Wasson of GameZone had expected more action from a Jurassic Park game. She praised the graphics, and the sound effects of the game's helicopters and "somewhat realistic" dinosaurs, but also felt that the animation and narration "could use some work". Wasson also criticized the game's slow loading times, its easy difficulty, and wrote that having to compete against the computer AI is boring. Wasson also believed the game's concept would have worked better with a different theme, rather than as a board game.

Jinny Gudmundsen of USA Today recommended the game for children over the age of 10 because of dinosaur violence. Gudmundsen considered the game's multiplayer option superior to its single-player mode, and said that gameplay could become boring once all the minigames have been played. Jason MacIsaac of The Electric Playground enjoyed the large collection of mini-games, but he criticized the game's long sessions, slow loading times, and the difficulty of the "Raging Raptors" mini-game.

Jurassic Park III: Danger Zone! sold an estimated 210,000 copies, totaling $4.6 million in revenue. In August 2006, Next Generation listed the game at number 97 on its list of "Top 100 PC Games of the 21st Century", which was arranged by number of copies sold. In 2018, Zack Zwiezen of Kotaku ranked the game among the "worst" Jurassic Park games ever released, calling it a "terrible knock off" of Mario Party and comparing it to Sonic Shuffle.
