= Jurassic Park III: Dino Defender =

2001 side-scrolling game

- Developer: Knowledge Adventure
- Publisher: Knowledge Adventure
- Series: Jurassic Park
- Platforms: Microsoft Windows, Macintosh
- Release: July 20, 2001
- Genre: Action
- Mode: Single player

Jurassic Park III: Dino Defender is a 2001 side-scrolling video game developed and published by Knowledge Adventure. It is based on the 2001 film Jurassic Park III. The player is depicted as a person in a bio-mechanical suit hired by Jurassic Park to bring power back to the electrified fences and capture all the free-roaming dinosaurs.

A modified version of the game's first level, as well as some of the game's animation and audio, was re-used for another video game titled Jurassic Park III: Danger Zone!, also developed and published by Knowledge Adventure.

== Plot ==
After a training mission, the player is shown a cutscene of a typhoon raging across Jurassic Park, a dinosaur theme park on the fictional island of Isla Sorna. Power to the island and its electrified fences is cut off from the storm, allowing the dinosaurs to escape. The player is briefed that all the dinosaurs must be captured "before they destroy one another". The player controls a Dino Defender, a person inside a bio-mechanical suit. The character first lands on a beach with a few Compsognathus on it. Soon after, the character runs into some Velociraptors at a small cliff. The character advances and then must swim while avoiding jellyfish and purple seaweed.

The character advances to an underwater cavern, where raptors and stegosaurs are encountered and must be captured or avoided. The character then discovers a steep ravine and is knocked over a cliff by a Pteranodon. The character climbs the cliff, jumping over many gaps while avoiding pterosaurs. At the top of the cliff, the character escapes baby pteranodons and a Tyrannosaurus rex. The T. rex then chases the character and falls down a pit after it crosses an unstable bridge, but survives. The character goes into the jungle and avoids additional dinosaurs, before going down a waterfall.

The character avoids a T. rex and discovers a construction elevator. A Spinosaurus arrives and the character escapes on vines. The T. rex and Spinosaurus face off, with the Spinosaurus fleeing. The character moves from the Tyrannosaurus pen to tunnels, where more Velociraptors must be captured. The character escapes to the visitor center and encounters the Spinosaurus. The character activates flip switches which cause the visitor center's dinosaur skeletons to crush the Spinosaurus. After leaving the visitor center, multiple helicopters fly off with the dinosaurs the character had tranquilized.

== Gameplay ==
The player is faced by a variety of dinosaurs, such as Velociraptor and Compsognathus.

The six levels of Dino Defender consist of fast-paced quick thinking challenges. The player must move around obstacles and find supply boxes, switch on circuit breakers and avoid dinosaurs. Helicopters drop supply boxes onto the island, which contain gear such as a net, a tranquilizer or a distractor flare which can be used to capture or distract dinosaurs. "Call boxes" can be used to lure dinosaurs and various other weapons to tranquilize them. "Circuit Breakers" scattered around the island can be switched on to activate the island's electricity. To collect gear to capture/tranquilize a certain dinosaur, the player must find a 'supply box' which contains a certain number of both 'call boxes', which are small speakers that play a dinosaur call, causing dinosaurs of that species to investigate.

At some points in the game, the player will have to swim underwater. When a player is underwater, an "air" gauge appears, which slowly decreases. The player will die if the gauge runs out of air. Upon completion of the game, the player is rewarded with printable trading cards showing the dinosaurs the player has captured. Trading cards for each dinosaur are only rewarded after all the dinosaurs belonging to a particular species have been captured.

== Reception ==
R. Gerbino of GameZone gave the game an 8 and praised its graphics, but criticized the difficulty of the game's later stages and also noted "choppy playback during dialogue sections". Jinny Gudmundsen of USA Today gave the game a rating of four out of five and recommended it for children age nine and older because of its challenging gameplay. Gudmundsen wrote: "Dino Defender works well because it requires an agile mind in addition to good hand-eye coordination".

Jason MacIsaac of The Electric Playground gave the game a 70 percent score. He enjoyed the game's non-violent interactive levels and also praised the many different moves that can be performed by the game's character. However, he considered certain parts of the game to be too difficult, and also complained of noticeable lag in transitions between screens. MacIsaac concluded that the game was a modest but doable platform game.

In 2018, Zack Zwiezen of Kotaku called the game "terrible" and among the "weirdest" Jurassic Park games ever released, writing: "The main character looks unlike anything seen in a Jurassic Park film, and when The Defender is just walking around a level without dinos on-screen it is easy to forget this is an official Jurassic Park III video game".

According to Edge, Dino Defender sold at least 100,000 copies in the United States, but was beaten by Jurassic Park III: Danger Zone!'s 210,000 sales in the region. Total US sales of Jurassic Park III computer games released in the 2000s reached 900,000 copies by August 2006.

== See also ==
- List of Jurassic Park video games
- Jurassic Park III
