= North Woods (novel) =

2023 novel by Daniel Mason

- 1st edition cover
- Author: Daniel Mason
- Language: English
- Genre: Historical fiction
- Publisher: Random House (US); John Murray (UK)
- Publication date: September 19, 2023 (US/UK)
- Publication place: United States; United Kingdom
- Pages: 400
- ISBN: 9780593597033

North Woods is a 2023 novel by American novelist Daniel Mason. The novel, Mason's sixth, is a work of historical fiction that tells the story of a single house in New England over the course of several centuries.

== Plot ==
North Woods follows the inhabitants of a single house in New England over the course of several centuries, from the earliest American colonies to the present day. The home's inhabitants and visitors include a set of Puritan lovers, twin sisters, a crime reporter, a cougar, and a pair of mating beetles.

== Development history ==
The novel has an epistolary structure, interspersing sequences of prose with letters, poems, journal entries, and case notes. In an interview with Scott Simon, Mason said that the structure allowed him to explore more voices than he otherwise would have been able to.

=== Publication history ===
North Woods was published in the United States by Random House on September 19, 2023. It was simultaneously released in the United Kingdom by John Murray. The book's UK publication rights had been acquired in September 2022, in what The Bookseller reported was a "six-figure deal".

== Reception ==
The New York Times Book Review described the novel as "brilliant," praising the book's structure and Mason's prose. The Washington Post's Ron Charles also praised the book's structure, adding that the overall design was elegant and concluding that the novel was "revelatory." The Wall Street Journal was similarly positive, complimenting the plot and prose but offering slight criticism towards the structure, writing that "a shift makes for a very different novel and, in this reader's opinion, a less exciting one." Library Journal, Shelf Awareness, and Booklist all directed praise at the novel's characters, with the latter describing them as reinforcing "the dual nature of the human condition." Positive reviews were also published in Publishers Weekly and Kirkus Reviews.

More mixed reviews were published in The Boston Globe and The Times Literary Supplement. The Boston Globe wrote that some of the epistolary devices scattered throughout the book were "more fanciful than fulfilling" and criticized Mason for not engaging more with historical inequities throughout the plot. The Times Literary Supplement criticized the inclusion of supernatural elements while praising the overall story and conclusion. By contrast, The Guardian positively described the book, with Alice Jolly writing that the book stretched "the limits of what the novel can do."

North Woods was a finalist for the National Book Critics Circle Award for Fiction in 2023 and received a PEN Oakland/Josephine Miles Award in 2024.
