= Jurassic Park III =

2001 film by Joe Johnston

- Theatrical release poster
- Directed by: Joe Johnston
- Written by: Peter Buchman; Alexander Payne; Jim Taylor
- Based on: Characters by Michael Crichton
- Produced by: Kathleen Kennedy; Larry Franco
- Starring: Sam Neill; William H. Macy; Téa Leoni; Alessandro Nivola; Trevor Morgan; Michael Jeter
- Cinematography: Shelly Johnson
- Edited by: Robert Dalva
- Music by: Don Davis (Note: Original Jurassic Park themes by John Williams)
- Production companies: Universal Pictures; Amblin Entertainment
- Distributed by: Universal Pictures
- Release dates: July 16, 2001 (Universal Amphitheater); July 18, 2001 (United States)
- Running time: 92 minutes
- Country: United States
- Language: English
- Budget: $93 million
- Box office: $368.8 million

Jurassic Park III is a 2001 American science fiction action film directed by Joe Johnston and written by Peter Buchman, Alexander Payne, and Jim Taylor. It is the third installment in the Jurassic Park franchise and the final film in the original trilogy, following The Lost World: Jurassic Park (1997). It was the first film in the franchise not to be directed by Steven Spielberg or based on a novel by Michael Crichton, although it features characters and concepts created by Crichton. The film stars Sam Neill, William H. Macy, Téa Leoni, and Michael Jeter, with a brief appearance by Laura Dern. Neill and Dern reprise their roles from the original film as Alan Grant and Ellie Sattler. The plot follows a divorced couple who deceive Grant into helping them search for their missing son on Isla Sorna.

Following the release of Spielberg's Jurassic Park (1993), Joe Johnston expressed interest in directing a sequel. Universal Pictures announced a third film in June 1998, with Johnston confirmed as director the following year. A screenplay draft by Peter Buchman was rejected five weeks before filming began in favor of a simpler story proposed by David Koepp, who had written the previous two films. Alexander Payne and Jim Taylor were subsequently hired to rewrite the first script, which Buchman further revised. Principal photography lasted five months, beginning in Hawaii in August 2000 before moving to California, with a production budget of $93 million. The screenplay was never fully completed during production, a situation that nearly prompted Johnston to leave the project. The film combines computer-generated imagery with animatronic dinosaurs. A Spinosaurus replaces the Tyrannosaurus from the first two films as the main principal dinosaur antagonist.

Jurassic Park III premiered on July 16, 2001 and received a theatrical release two days later. Despite mixed reviews from critics, it was a commercial success, grossing $368.8 million worldwide and ranking as the eighth highest-grossing film of 2001. However, it remains the lowest-grossing installment in the franchise. A sequel, Jurassic World, was released in 2015.

== Plot ==
Paleontologist Alan Grant struggles to secure funding for his Velociraptor research, where he attempts to prove his hypothesis that the dinosaurs were intellectually and socially advanced. Instead, he finds himself rebuffing the public's obsession with the events on Isla Nublar (Note: As depicted in Jurassic Park (1993)) and the InGen incident in San Diego. (Note: As depicted in The Lost World: Jurassic Park (1997)) He receives encouragement to continue from his now-married ex-partner Ellie Sattler and his assistant Billy Brennan, who uses 3D printing to replicate a Velociraptor larynx. Wealthy couple Paul and Amanda Kirby offer to fund his research in return for a guided aerial tour of Isla Sorna, claiming they have permission to fly there. (Note: The island was restricted to visitors following the events of The Lost World: Jurassic Park (1997).)

Alan reluctantly agrees, flying there with Billy, two of the Kirbys' mercenary associates, Udesky and Cooper, and their pilot, Nash. When the Kirbys try to have Nash land the plane, Alan protests and is knocked unconscious by Cooper. He awakens to find they have landed and the Kirbys refuse to leave, until a Spinosaurus approaches them. They attempt to escape but the dinosaur attacks their plane during take-off and kills Cooper. The plane crashes in the forest and the Spinosaurus kills Nash and swallows Paul's satellite phone. The survivors flee, encountering a Tyrannosaurus, which is promptly defeated by the Spinosaurus as the humans escape.

The Kirbys reveal they are a divorced middle-class couple searching for their son Eric and Amanda's boyfriend Ben Hildebrand, who have been missing for eight weeks and were last seen illegally parasailing by the island. Government agencies declined to help so they deceived Alan to secure his assistance, mistakenly believing he had experience on Isla Sorna. The group searches for Eric and Ben, finding the latter's corpse attached to the parasail near a Velociraptor nest. They discover the InGen compound, where they are attacked by a pack of Velociraptors, who kill Udesky. Alan is separated from the rest of the group but is saved from the raptors by Eric, who has been sheltering in a supply truck.

The following morning, Alan and Eric reunite with Billy and Eric's parents and narrowly escape the Spinosaurus again. Alan finds Billy stole Velociraptor eggs, which resulted in the earlier attacks. Billy hoped to sell the eggs to fund their dig site, which Alan disapproves of, but keeps the eggs regardless, hoping the Velociraptors may spare the group if they are returned. The group enters an aviary and is attacked by a flock of Pteranodons, one of which takes Eric to its nest to feed him to its young; Billy rescues Eric using the parasail but is seemingly killed while the rest escape by boat along an adjacent river. They retrieve the satellite phone and Grant contacts Ellie for help while they are attacked once again by the Spinosaurus.

The following day, the group hears a helicopter overhead and arrives at the coast, but are ambushed by the Velociraptors, who have come for the eggs. Alan, finding the replicated larynx in Billy's bag, uses it to confuse the pack. Upon hearing distant helicopters, the raptors reclaim their eggs and retreat. The U.S. Marines and Navy, summoned by Ellie, land on the beach and rescue the survivors. On a helicopter, they discover that an injured Billy has also been rescued. They watch the now-freed Pteranodons fly alongside them as they leave the island.

== Cast ==
- Sam Neill as Alan Grant, a paleontologist who survived the incident on Isla Nublar
- William H. Macy as Paul Kirby, Amanda's former husband and Eric's father
- Téa Leoni as Amanda Kirby, Paul's former wife and Eric's mother
- Alessandro Nivola as Billy Brennan, Grant's assistant
- Trevor Morgan as Eric Kirby, Paul and Amanda's son who is lost on Isla Sorna
- Michael Jeter as Udesky, the Kirbys' mercenary associate
- John Diehl as Cooper, the Kirbys' secondary mercenary associate
- Bruce A. Young as Nash, the pilot of the group's airplane
- Laura Dern as Ellie Sattler, an author and paleobotanist who visited Isla Nublar with Alan in the first film
- Taylor Nichols as Mark Degler, Ellie's husband who works for the State Dept.
- Mark Harelik as Ben Hildebrand, Amanda's boyfriend who goes parasailing with Eric
- Julio Oscar Mechoso as Enrique Cardoso, the parasailing operator
- Blake Bryan as Charlie, Mark and Ellie's son

== Production ==
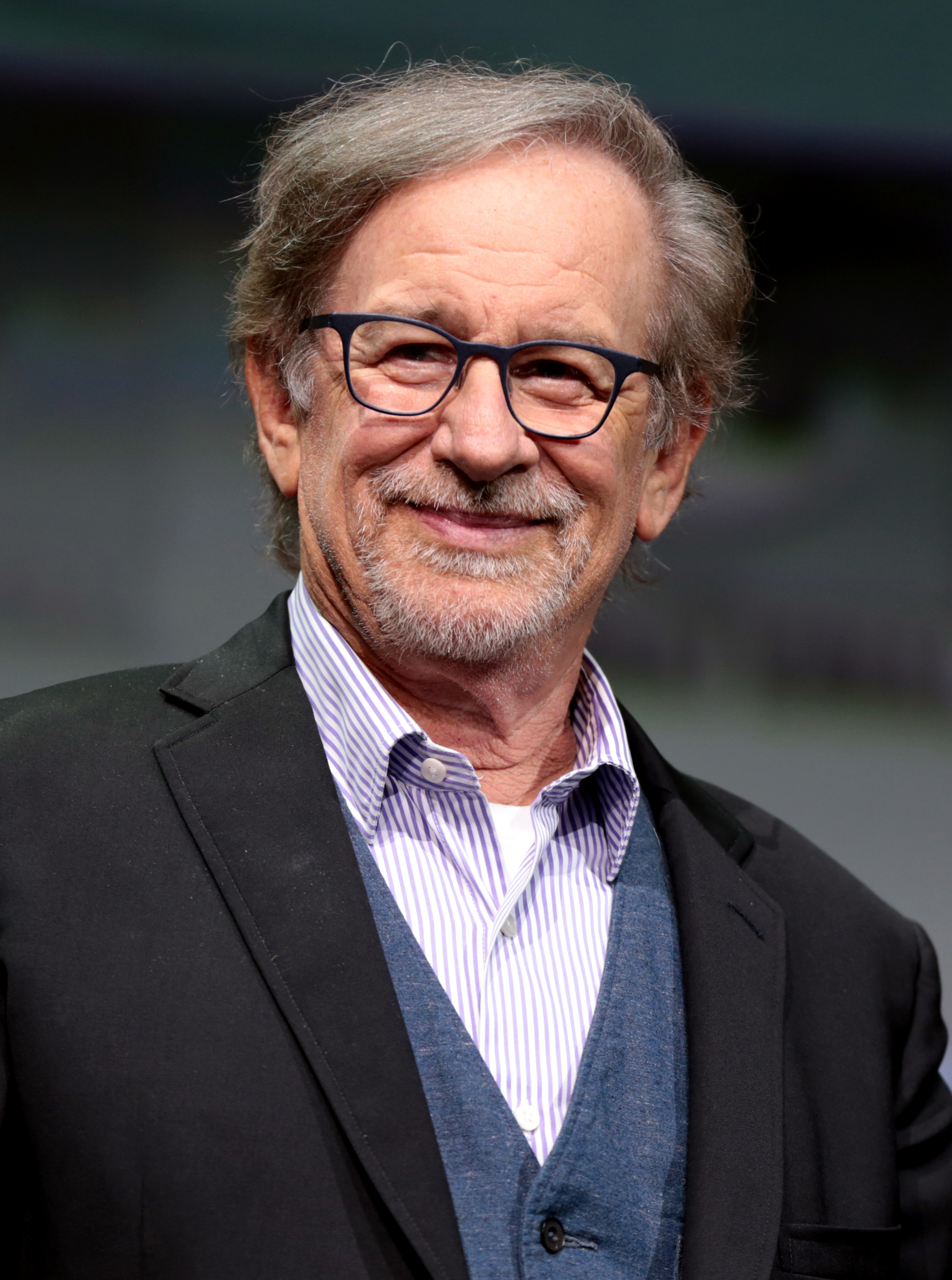
Steven Spielberg

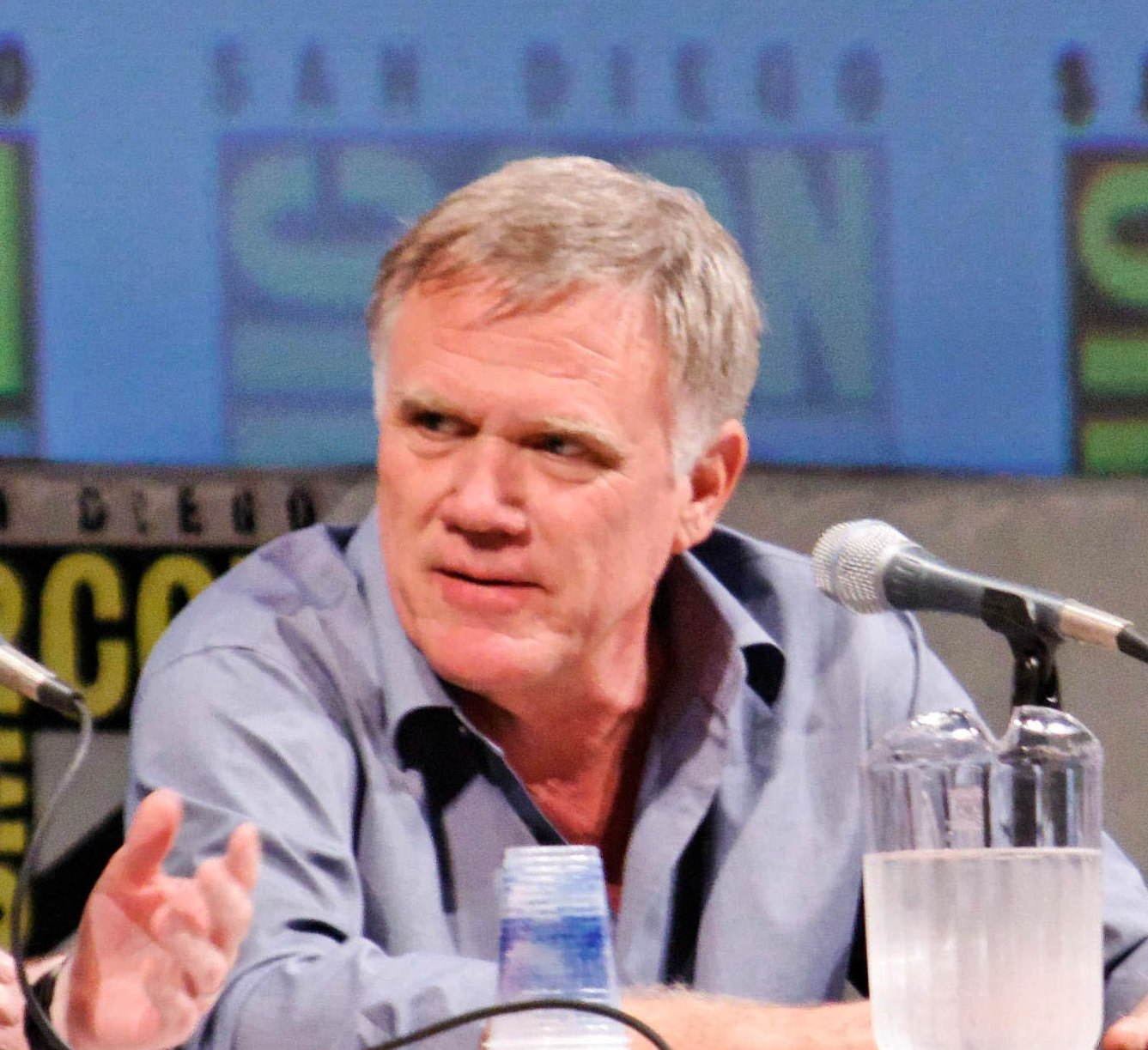
Joe Johnston

Following the release of Steven Spielberg's Jurassic Park in 1993, his friend Joe Johnston expressed interest in directing a potential sequel. Although Spielberg expected to direct the sequel, he agreed that Johnston could helm a third film. The second film, The Lost World: Jurassic Park, features a scene in which a Tyrannosaurus rampages through San Diego. Spielberg had originally intended to use the sequence in a third film but later incorporated it into the second installment after realizing he was unlikely to direct another entry in the series.

After the release of the second film in May 1997, Spielberg was busy with other projects; when asked about the possibility of a third Jurassic Park film, he responded that it would give him a tremendous headache "just to think about it". Spielberg had no intention of returning to the Jurassic Park series as a director, stating that the films were difficult to make. He had been satisfied with directing the previous films, and felt that the third film needed someone new to take over. After the release of the second film, Johnston again asked Spielberg about directing a Jurassic Park sequel.

=== Pre-production ===
Universal Pictures announced the film in June 1998, with Spielberg as a producer. Michael Crichton, who wrote the Jurassic Park novels, was to collaborate with Spielberg to create a storyline and write a script, although Johnston later said that Crichton had no involvement with the project. The film was originally set for release in mid-2000. Spielberg initially devised a story involving Dr. Alan Grant, who was discovered to have been living on one of InGen's islands. According to Johnston: "He'd snuck in, after not being allowed in to research the dinosaurs, and was living in a tree like Robinson Crusoe. But I couldn't imagine this guy wanting to get back on any island that had dinosaurs in it after the first movie".

Craig Rosenberg, who previously wrote and directed Hotel de Love, began writing the first draft of Jurassic Park III in June 1999. Spielberg and Johnston were impressed by Rosenberg's prior work, which included thriller screenplays for Spielberg's company DreamWorks. Rosenberg's draft involved teenagers becoming marooned on Isla Sorna, and it included a sequence involving the aquatic reptile Kronosaurus, which was not featured in the final film. Another scrapped scene would involve characters on motorcycles trying to evade raptors.

Johnston was announced as the film's director in August 1999, with Rosenberg still attached. Spielberg gave complete creative freedom to Johnston, who said that Spielberg "has strongly pointed out that I shouldn't try to copy him". Production was expected to begin in early 2000. The previous films were shot in Hawaii, and the island of Kauai was the preferred filming location for the third film, although no decisions would be made until the finalization of the script. Rosenberg's draft about teenagers on Isla Sorna was rejected in September 1999. Johnston said it was "not a badly written script", but he felt that viewers would not want to see such a story, also saying that it read like a bad episode of Friends.

==== Buchman draft ====
Peter Buchman was hired to rewrite Rosenberg's draft, and did so going into early 2000. Buchman's draft involves dinosaurs causing a series of mysterious killings on the mainland, followed by an investigation. The script also has a parallel story that involves Alan Grant, Billy, and a family crash-landing on Isla Sorna.

The draft begins with a vacationing couple who go parasailing over Isla Sorna, becoming the latest tourists to go missing there. A representative for the U.S. State Department, Harlan Finch, goes to Costa Rica and meets environmentalist Simone Garcia, who informs him of a recent dinosaur attack. Meanwhile, Grant is seeking financial donors for a raptor research station that he wants to build on Isla Sorna. Finch offers Grant exclusive research rights to the island if he will help the U.S. government acquire jurisdiction over it. Grant agrees and is scheduled to testify along with Simone at a hearing, to be held the next day in San José, Costa Rica.

Grant also meets Paul Roby, a wealthy businessman who offers him a donation if he will host an aerial tour of Isla Sorna. Grant agrees, and they fly over the island prior to the hearing, along with Grant's graduate student Billy Hume and Paul's 12-year-old son Miles, a dinosaur enthusiast. Also on the tour is Paul's bodyguard Cooper, and Susan Brentworth, Paul's business associate and girlfriend. The plane is forced to land on the island after hitting an unidentified object. As it takes off again, it hits a Spinosaurus and crashes. The story would then alternate between the island and San José. The hearing would reveal that dinosaur attacks have taken place in various mainland locations, ranging from the Baja California Peninsula to Panama. Finch becomes concerned that the dinosaurs are breeding, thus posing a worldwide problem.

The island scenes would largely play out the same as the final film, although the aviary and InGen laboratory sequences were much longer and more complex in this draft. Part of the script would involve the humans spending the night in the laboratory and making it their base of operations, although velociraptors would eventually sneak into the lab, after Billy stole their eggs. The humans would escape on dirt bikes and later take refuge in treetops. Cooper would die to velociraptors while protecting Miles, and Billy would die to a Pteranodon during the aviary sequence. Near the end of the draft, the U.S. government sends in fighter jets to bomb the island and destroy its dinosaur population. In the process, Roby is spotted by a pilot and he and his family are rescued from the island. However, Grant refuses to leave and, in his final scene, retreats into the jungle, incorporating Spielberg's initial idea.

These final scenes inspired the title Jurassic Park: Extinction, although the filmmakers decided against this name as it seemed to suggest a definitive end to the franchise. Johnston also considered it a vague title, with Extinction potentially referring to the dinosaurs, the human population, or Grant. The name was eventually simplified as Jurassic Park III. Johnston said that no one was "particularly fond" of the title "but you certainly knew what it meant". Other potential titles included Jurassic Park: Breakout and The Extinction: Jurassic Park 3.

Filming locations were scouted for this draft, including Fiordland, New Zealand, which was once considered as a location for the previous film. In March 2000, Maui, Hawaii, reportedly had been chosen instead of New Zealand.

==== Casting and further rewrites ====
Sam Neill signed to the project in June 2000, reprising his role from the first film as Alan Grant. Johnston later described Grant in the third film as being more cynical and sarcastic following the character's experience in the first film. Neill turned down a role in Peter Jackson's The Lord of the Rings: The Fellowship of the Ring (2001) to reprise his role in the film. Neill was happy to return, as he felt his performance in the first film could have been better. Hawaii was confirmed as a filming location for a three-week shoot, and filming overall was expected to take 18 weeks. Filming was scheduled to begin by August 2000, with a projected release in July 2001. William H. Macy originally turned down his role due to scheduling conflicts, so filming was delayed by a month. Macy had been working with Laura Dern on the 2001 film Focus, and she urged him to accept the role in Jurassic Park III. Trevor Morgan and Téa Leoni were subsequently announced as cast members.

Johnston felt that Buchman's draft was too complicated, particularly in getting Grant back to an island of dinosaurs. When screenwriter David Koepp held discussions with Johnston, Koepp suggested the simpler "rescue mission" plot. Koepp had written the previous two films, but had no involvement in writing the script for Jurassic Park III. In July 2000, about five weeks before filming began, Johnston and Spielberg rejected the entire second script because they were dissatisfied with it; $18 million had already been spent on the film, which had been storyboarded and budgeted. Some set-building had already begun, as well. The rejection came after Johnston and Spielberg approved Koepp's story idea, believing it to be superior to the earlier story. Many sequences from the second rejected draft, and some from the original draft, were incorporated into the final film as a way of salvaging the work that had been put into the project up to that point. At the time, Utah's Dinosaur National Monument and a military base at Oahu were being considered as filming locations.

Alexander Payne and Jim Taylor began rewriting Buchman's script in July 2000, while Spielberg signed a deal with Universal to receive 20% of the film's profits. Payne and Taylor were hired to improve the film's characters and story, as the script primarily consisted of action. They were surprised to receive the writing offer, as the project differed from past films on which they had worked, but Universal had been impressed with their rewrite on the studio's film Meet the Parents. Payne and Taylor were not hardcore fans of the Jurassic Park franchise, although Taylor enjoyed its premise. The two writers watched the previous Jurassic Park films and spent the next four weeks writing their draft of the script.

Payne and Taylor had previously written Citizen Ruth (1996), which starred Dern. She had also portrayed Ellie in the first Jurassic Park film. The character was absent from the previous Jurassic Park III script, so Payne and Taylor decided to write in a small part for Dern to reprise the role. She was initially hesitant to reappear only for a cameo, so Spielberg suggested that Ellie have an important role in saving the characters on the island. Dern was convinced after learning that Payne and Taylor were working on the script. In one draft, Neill and Dern's characters were a couple in the process of splitting up. Johnston said: "I didn't want to see them as a couple anymore. For one thing, I don't think they look like a couple. It would be uncomfortable to still see them together. And Laura Dern doesn't look like she's aged for the past 15 years!"

Buchman made subsequent revisions to the script, and John August did uncredited work on it, as well. Much of the humor added by Payne and Taylor was not used in the final film. According to Payne: "We gave them a new script, and then we saw the movie, and it's all action. They took the rest out!" Writing credit ultimately went to Buchman, Payne, and Taylor. Johnston described the final film as simpler, faster-moving, and more intense than the earlier films.

=== Filming ===
A final draft of the script was never completed during production. While the first act was mostly in place, the middle portion of the script was not as complete, and the ending had yet to be written. Principal photography began on August 30, 2000, and it lasted five months. Filming the script was a lengthy process because of technical preparations before scenes. Macy criticized the project during filming. Commenting on the slow pace of filming, he said "we would do a quarter-page, [or] some days, an eighth of a page. And that would be a full 12-hour day". Johnston said that filming ultimately went over schedule by a few days, primarily because of weather and unexpected technical issues, although he was satisfied with how the schedule eventually turned out considering these issues.

Macy also noted that executive producer Spielberg was not seen on set, despite a chair bearing his name that was always present, with Macy saying, "You don't know if it's a threat or a promise!" Spielberg was busy creating the 2001 film A.I. Artificial Intelligence. While Macy was impressed with the Jurassic Park III footage, he criticized the project for starting without a finished script: "The script has been evolving and being rewritten as we go, and what you want to say is, 'Who launched a $100 million ship without a rudder, and who's getting fired for this?' But that's the way it goes. That's the way they make these movies... big deal. I think someone should be shot, but I'm not in charge". Johnston said the actors went through an uncomfortable production shoot and that Macy may have simply made the critical comments on a bad day of filming. As the film approached its release, Macy said: "It was about the most amazing thing I've ever done in this business".

Johnston thought about quitting the project on a few occasions because of uncertainty about how the film would turn out, considering that it did not have a finished script. He said that making the film was "a living hell on a daily basis", and that shooting without a finished script was "nerve-wracking, but it was also a way of freeing up the whole creative process. We could literally decide on the day how we wanted a scene to progress. I'm not saying it's the way to make movies, but it gives you more freedom". Johnston said the actors were "very flexible" and that they dealt with the lack of a finished script "the best they could".

Actor Alessandro Nivola criticized the film after its release, saying in a 2002 interview: "It was like the only part I've ever done that just had nothing for me to latch on to, character-wise. [...] It was kind of maddening". The actors were frequently bruised during filming. Leoni said "more of my makeup was to cover the real bruises than to create fake ones". Michael Lantieri, who worked on the previous films, returned as the special effects consultant. Lantieri said that Jurassic Park III was the most physically demanding film of the series: "We had a cast that was willing to get real bruises and bumps, be around real heat, and actually go underwater".

==== Locations ====
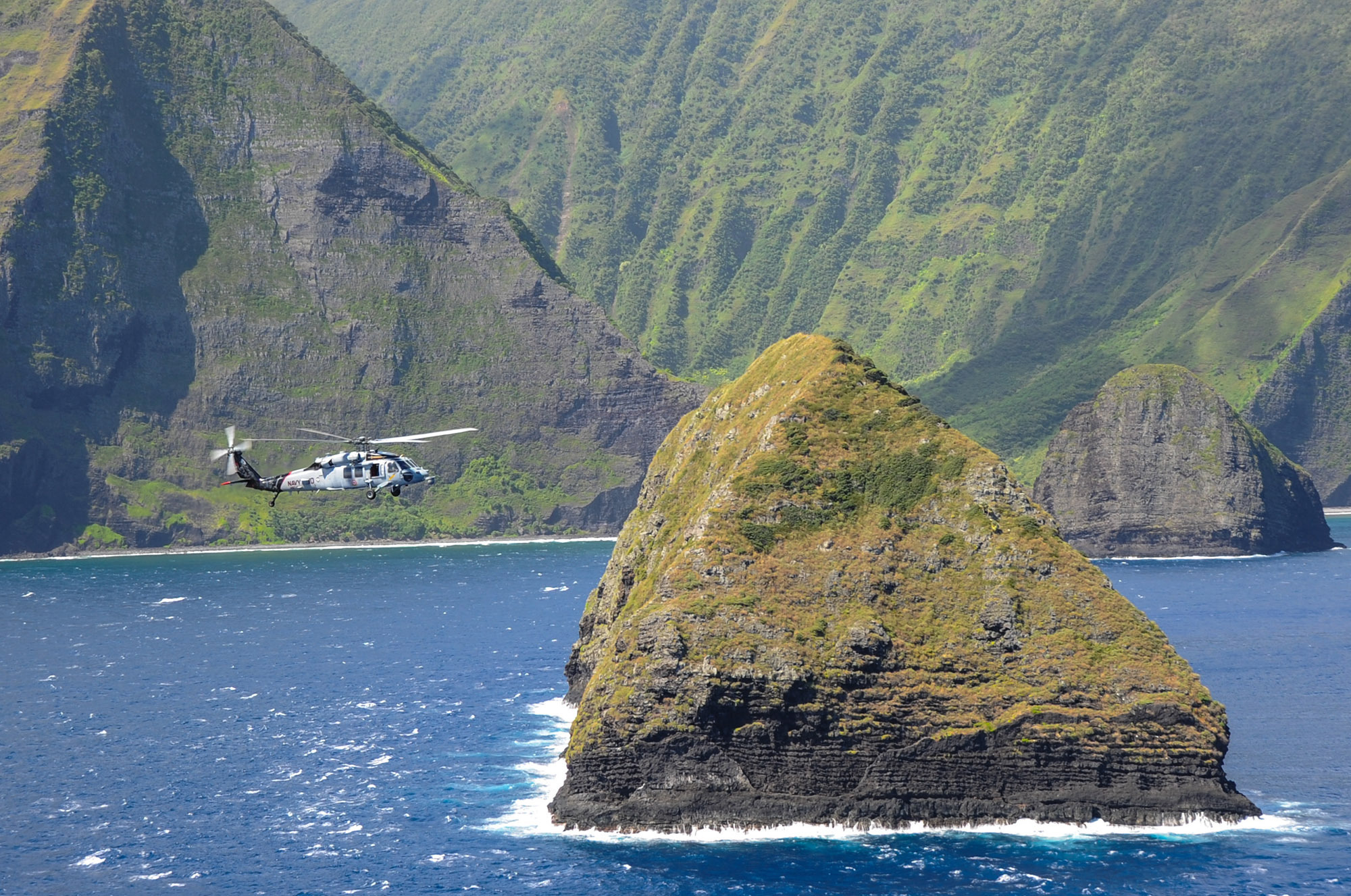
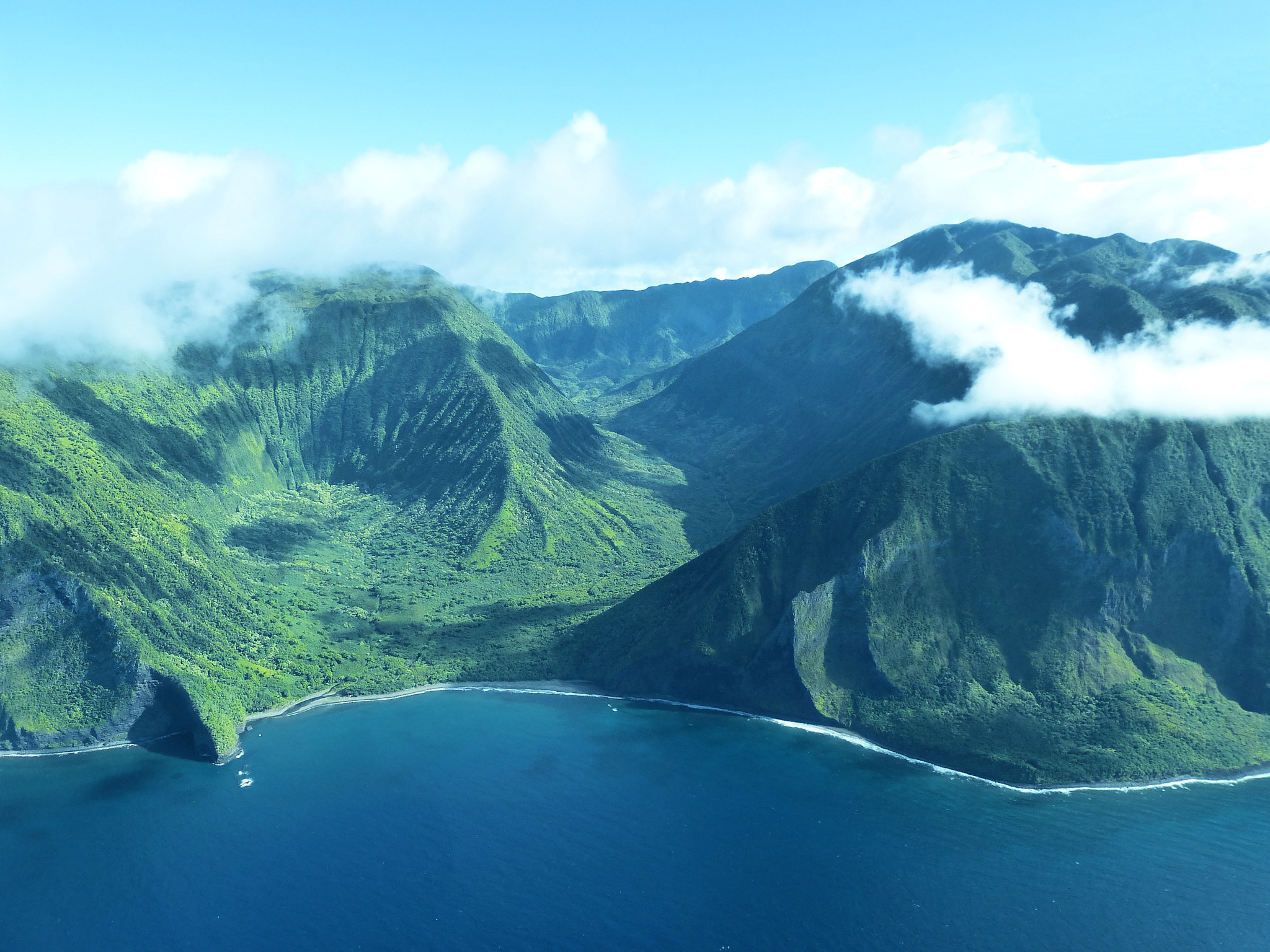
The island of Molokai

Filming began at Dillingham Airfield in Mokulēia, Hawaii, and continued on Oahu during early September 2000. Filming in Oahu included Heeia Kea Ranch. Aerial footage of Molokai's North Shore cliffs was then filmed over a two-day period, followed by a week of filming in Kauai, where locations included Hanalei Valley and rain forests in the Manoa Valley. Filming in Hawaii concluded in mid-September 2000, after scenes were shot at the South Fork of Kauai's Wailua River. By that time, John August had been hired to do the uncredited script revisions, which were followed by additional work from Buchman. Macy also wrote a scene.

After the Hawaii shoot, production moved to California. A dinosaur lecture given by the character of Grant was filmed at Occidental College in Los Angeles on October 10, 2000. Scenes were filmed at Center Bay Studios in Los Angeles at the end of the month. Other filming locations in California included a rock quarry in Irwindale, while the interior of the InGen compound was filmed in a warehouse located east of downtown Los Angeles. Another scene was filmed at El Mirage Lake, where Udesky and the mercenaries prepare for their visit to Isla Sorna. Dern's small role as Ellie was filmed in a day. Scenes set at Ellie's house were filmed in South Pasadena, California.

Filming moved to Universal Studios' backlot in Los Angeles for 96 days. Production designer Ed Verreaux and greensman Danny Ondrejko created a jungle rain forest at Universal's Stage 12. Ondrejko and his 14-member team took two months to create the jungle set, and Lantieri's team created mist and fog through the use of pipes. Johnston was impressed with the set and had difficulty distinguishing it from the jungles in Hawaii.

The most challenging scene for Lantieri was the Spinosaurus attack on the plane, which was filmed on a soundstage. Lantieri's team built four plane props for the scene, which begins with the crashed plane in a tree, 15 feet (4.6 m) above ground. The plane soon falls to the ground and is rolled around by the Spinosaurus. For the early portion of the sequence, Lantieri created a pneumatic gimbal disguised as a tree, with the plane placed on top. The gimbal had 100 horsepower and was powered by hydraulics and hoses, allowing the plane to be shaken and tilted. The plane also had a breakaway cockpit area for a shot in which the Spinosaurus tears the front end off.

A later portion of the attack scene required close collaboration between Lantieri and Stan Winston's puppeteer team, who oversaw control of a full-scale Spinosaurus leg prop. The leg, suspended in the air by two poles, was slammed down into one of the plane fuselage props for a series of shots. Another prop plane was rigged with a hydraulic machine, which crushed the fuselage from the inside, giving the impression that it was being crushed by the Spinosaurus. With another prop plane, the actors were filmed inside the fuselage as it is rolled around. The actors agreed to do their own stunts for the scene, which Macy compared to being inside a clothes dryer. Stunt people were only used for one shot during this scene.

The film is the first in the series not to be based on a novel, although it includes characters and ideas from Crichton, who wrote the novels that inspired the previous two films. For Jurassic Park III, Crichton received a "based on characters created by" credit. Scenes involving a pterosaur aviary and a T. rex's attempted attack on a river raft were featured in the first novel Jurassic Park (1990). Although these scenes were absent from the novel's film adaptation, they were added into Jurassic Park III. The film's Spinosaurus attack on the boat is a modified version of the scene from the novel.

At Falls Lake, located on the Universal lot, Verreaux and his team built a giant rock wall as part of a set that would depict InGen's Pteranodon aviary. Three months were spent laying foam blocks that were molded by hand to form jagged rock. A team subsequently built a 10-story, three-sided scaffold covered with netting to simulate the aviary. The aviary scene was filmed in early December 2000. The set was then redecorated for the nighttime sequence in which the Spinosaurus attacks the boat. The scene involved rain and fire, and took nine nights of filming. Part of the scene required Macy to stand on a giant crane and distract the Spinosaurus. Macy fell off the crane, but had a harness. Another portion of the scene required the actors to perform under water. The scene depicting the satellite phone in Spinosaurus feces was filmed using 250 US gallons (950 L; 210 imp gal) of oatmeal.

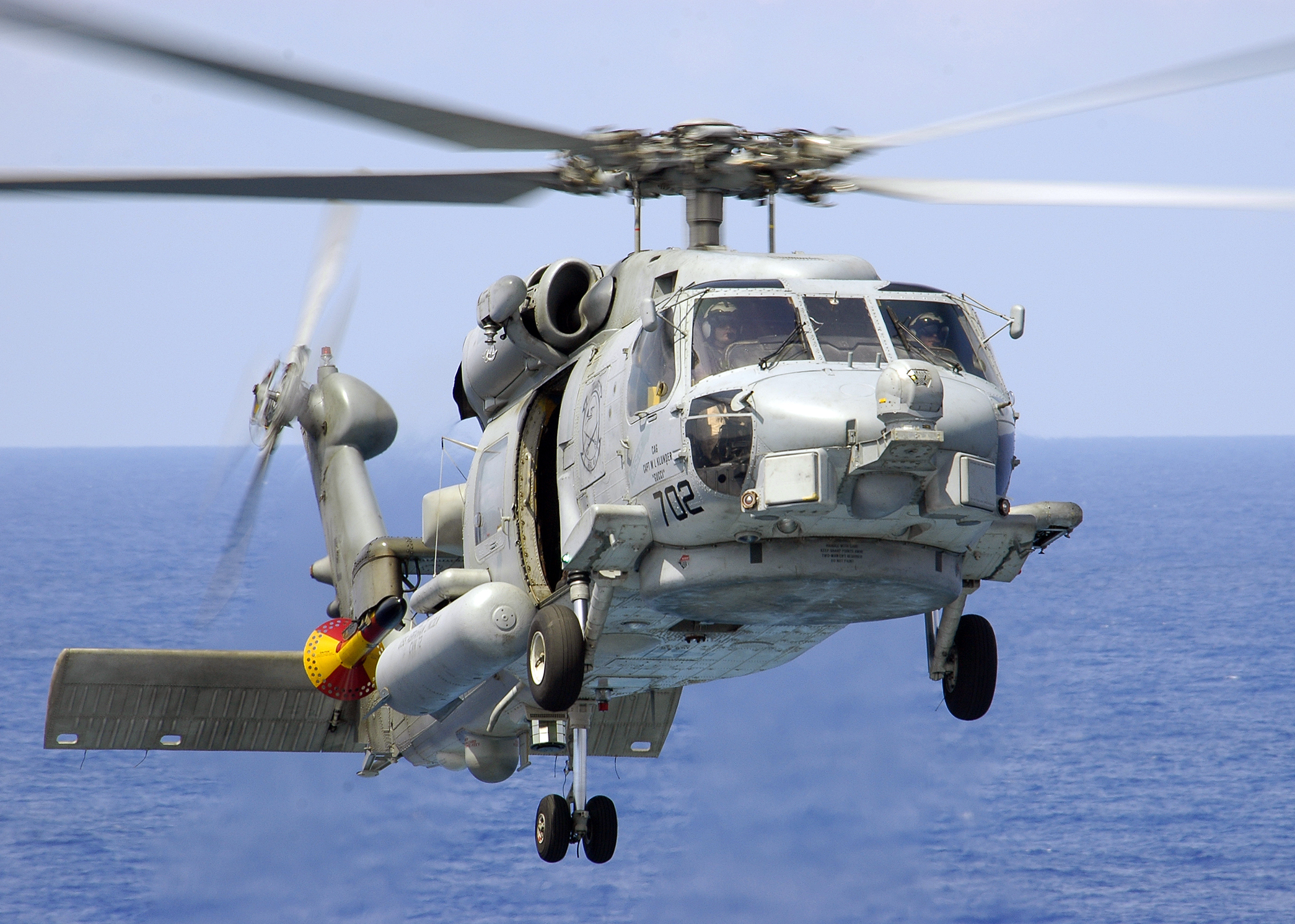
The Pentagon lent the production team two Sikorsky SH-60 Seahawk helicopters.

In a November 2000 draft of the script, the U.S. State Department was to send in a helicopter and Ellie to rescue the characters, with Ellie explaining that she arrived thanks to a good friend at the department. This ending was not considered exciting enough, resulting in the final ending with the Marines and Navy coming to rescue the characters, while excluding Ellie from coming to the island. In the final film, Ellie's husband is an employee of the State Department, although his involvement in rescuing the group is not specified. The new ending was written in December, and the Pentagon lent two Sikorsky SH-60 Seahawks to the production, as well as four assault amphibious vehicles and 80 Marines. Production returned to Hawaii in January 2001 to film the ending on Kauai's Pila'a Beach. The film's longest rough cut without credits was around 96 minutes long. The final film, including credits, is 92 minutes, making it the shortest installment in the series.

=== Creatures on screen ===
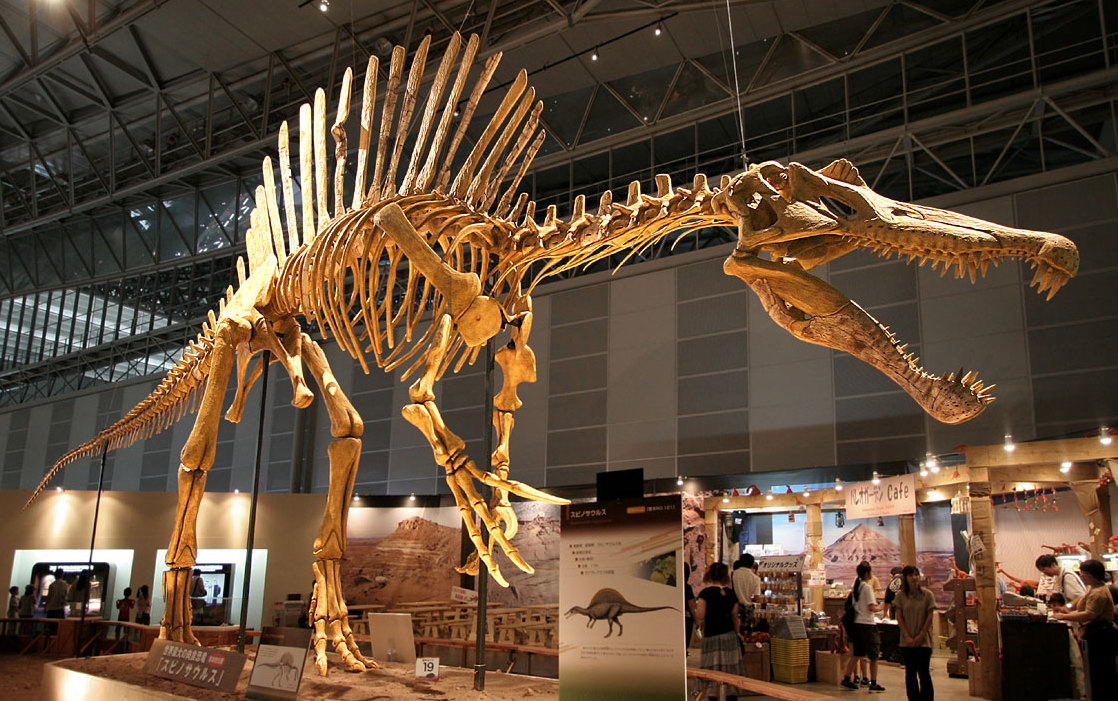
Spinosaurus features prominently in Jurassic Park III.

As with the previous films, Industrial Light & Magic (ILM) provided dinosaurs through computer-generated imagery (CGI), while Stan Winston and his team provided animatronics. The animatronics were more advanced than those used in previous films, and included the ability to blink, for an increased sense of realism. While animatronics were used for close-up shots, other scenes used sticks with pictures of dinosaur heads attached, as placeholders to which the actors could react.

Puppeteers worked together to create the T. rex, Spinosaurus, and Velociraptor movements. Multiple puppeteers were assigned to operate different parts of each animatronic dinosaur, and in some cases, hours of practice were needed for a dinosaur's puppeteers to perform in synchrony. The animatronics were powerful and considered dangerous, as one wrong move could kill someone. One scene, depicting Udesky's death, was filmed with Winston team member John Rosengrant wearing a partial raptor suit.

Winston's team took roughly 13 months to design and create the various practical dinosaurs. ILM scanned dinosaur sculptures, also created by Winston's team, to create the computer-generated versions of the animals. ILM designed some dinosaurs entirely through CGI, including Ankylosaurus and Brachiosaurus. New dinosaurs not featured in earlier films included the Ankylosaurus, in addition to Ceratosaurus and Corythosaurus.

Like the previous films, paleontologist Jack Horner worked as technical advisor. Horner was brought on early in the film's development when story ideas were being considered. After two films, the filmmakers wanted to replace the T. rex with a new dinosaur antagonist. Baryonyx was originally considered, and early concept posters reflected this. Horner ultimately persuaded the filmmakers to replace the T. rex with the larger Spinosaurus, an animal which had a distinctive sail on its back. Johnston said that "a lot of dinosaurs have a very similar silhouette to the T. rex ... and we wanted the audience to instantly recognize this as something else". Horner hypothesized that T. rex was more of a scavenger, while Spinosaurus was a true predator. The roars of the Spinosaurus in the film were created by mixing the low guttural sounds of a lion and an alligator, a bear cub crying, and a lengthened cry of a large bird that gave the roars a raspy quality.

Winston and his sculptors created an initial Spinosaurus design, and Horner then provided his scientific opinion. Winston's team began with a 1/16 maquette version of the Spinosaurus, before creating a 1/5-scale version with more detail, leading to the creation of the final, full-scale version. The process took 10 months. The Spinosaurus animatronic was built from the knees up, while full body shots of the animal were done through CGI. The animatronic measured 44 feet (13 m) long, weighed 13 tons and was faster and more powerful than the 9-ton T. rex. Winston and his team had to remove a wall to get the Spinosaurus out of Winston's studio, located in Van Nuys, California. It was then transported by flatbed truck to the jungle set at Stage 12. Verreaux had to design the set to accommodate the dinosaur; a track was placed that allowed the creature to be moved backward and forward. Four Winston technicians were required to fully operate the Spinosaurus.

The fight between the Spinosaurus and T. rex was one of the last scenes shot for the film, and the two animatronics were put to extensive use for the fight. A T. rex animatronic from the previous film was re-skinned for its appearance in Jurassic Park III. The Spinosaurus animatronic was so powerful that it ripped the head off of the T. rex during filming. Johnston said the fight was meant as a modern homage to various earlier films that featured dinosaurs created by Ray Harryhausen. An early script featured a death sequence for the Spinosaurus near the end of the film, as Grant would use the resonating chamber to call a pack of raptors which would attack and kill it.

Because of new discoveries and theories in the field of paleontology, several dinosaurs are portrayed differently in this film from in previous ones. Discoveries suggesting velociraptors were feathered prompted the addition of quill-like structures on the head and neck of the males in the film. Horner said: "We've found evidence that velociraptors had feathers, or feather-like structures, and we've incorporated that into the new look of the raptor".

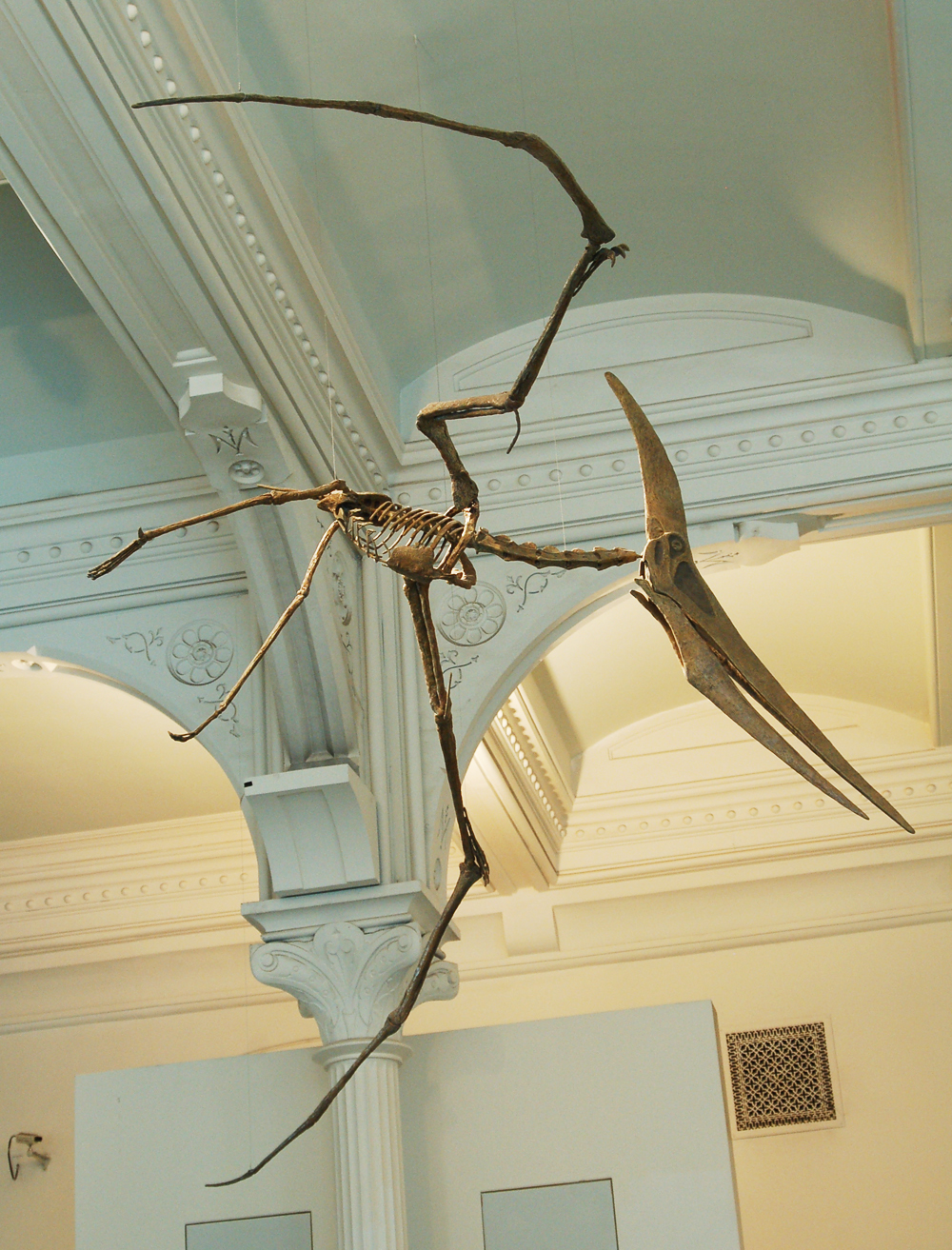
Spielberg insisted that Johnston feature Pteranodon in the film.

Spielberg insisted that Johnston include Pteranodons, which had been removed from the previous films for budget reasons, with the exception of a brief appearance in The Lost World: Jurassic Park. The Pteranodons featured in Jurassic Park III are a fictionalized version of the actual animal. Winston and his team created a Pteranodon model with a wingspan of 40 feet (12 m), although the creatures are predominantly featured in the film through CGI. ILM animators studied footage of bats and birds while in flight, and also closely worked with a Pteranodon expert to create the creatures' flight movements. In addition, Winston's team designed and created five rod puppets to depict baby pteranodons in a nest, with puppeteers working underneath the nest to control them. Johnston chose the pteranodons to end the film because he wanted an ending shot of "these creatures being beautiful and elegant". At one point, there were discussions about a final sequence in which the pteranodons would attack the survivors in their helicopter after departing from the island. This was scrapped for budgetary reasons.

The film contains more than 400 effects shots, about twice the number featured in the two previous films combined. Most of the shots were for the fight between the T. rex and Spinosaurus, and for the Pteranodon aviary sequence. Less than half of the shots involved dinosaurs, as the animators also had to focus on environmental surroundings, such as jungle foliage brushed by dinosaurs. Some shots were only a few seconds long, but required months of work.

A list of creatures seen on-screen are:

- Spinosaurus
- Tyrannosaurus rex
- Velociraptor
- Compsognathus
- Parasaurolophus
- Corythosaurus
- Pteranodon
- Ceratosaurus
- Brachiosaurus
- Ankylosaurus
- Stegosaurus
- Triceratops

== Soundtrack ==
Composer John Williams, who worked on the previous films, was busy writing the music for A.I. Artificial Intelligence; he recommended Don Davis to write the Jurassic Park III score. Williams's original themes and several new ones—such as one for the Spinosaurus that focused on low sounds, with tubas, trombones, and timpani—were integrated into the score. The fight between the Spinosaurus and the Tyrannosaurus, which Davis compared to King Kong's fight with dinosaurs in the 1933 film, juxtaposes the Spinosaurus theme with the one Williams wrote for the T. rex. In addition, "Big Hat, No Cattle", a song by Randy Newman, was used in a restaurant scene. The soundtrack was released in July 2001.

== Marketing and merchandise ==
A teaser trailer of Jurassic Park III was released online in September 2000, and was also included on DVD releases of the previous films. The first image from the film was released four months later. Universal avoided excessive early marketing to prevent a possible backlash; the studio believed awareness of the film was already sufficient. Marketing began in April 2001, three months before the film's release. The first footage from the film was aired during the second-season finale of Survivor in May 2001, and the official website went online at the end of June. Promotional partners included Kodak and the Coca-Cola Company. No fast-food promotions took place in the United States, although children's meal toys based on the film were offered in Canadian Burger King outlets.

A novelization by Scott Ciencin, aimed at young children, was published, as well. Ciencin also wrote three children's books to tie in with the film's events: Jurassic Park Adventures: Survivor, the first book, details the eight weeks Eric spent alone on Isla Sorna; Jurassic Park Adventures: Prey has Eric and Alan returning to Isla Sorna to rescue a group of teenage filmmakers; and Jurassic Park Adventures: Flyers involves Eric and Alan leading the Pteranodon home after they nest in a Universal Studios theme park.

In early 2001, Hasbro released a line of 3.5-inch (89 mm) action figures including electronic dinosaurs, humans, and vehicles, to coincide with the film's release. The figures were scaled down from the previous Jurassic Park toy lines produced by Kenner. Other toys were released through the Lego Studios brand, while Playskool released a line called Jurassic Park Junior, aimed at young children.

Several video games were released in 2001. Knowledge Adventure produced three games, Jurassic Park III: Danger Zone!, Jurassic Park III: Dino Defender, and Scan Command: Jurassic Park, all for Microsoft Windows. Three others were released by Konami for the Game Boy Advance, including Jurassic Park III: The DNA Factor, Jurassic Park III: Island Attack, and Jurassic Park III: Park Builder. An arcade game, also titled Jurassic Park III, was released by Konami as well.

In November 2001, to promote the film's impending home media release, Universal launched a viral marketing website for Isla Travel, a fictional Isla Sorna travel agency.

=== Cell phone promotion ===
For the film's home media release, Universal partnered with cell-phone company Hop-On to produce "the world's first disposable cell phone", which would have been available through an in-package offer upon purchase of the film. The phones were to be delivered free to customers who responded to a winning promotional card that was supplied with selected copies of the film. Around 5,000 copies of the film contained a winning card, and approximately 1,000 of them were redeemed.

The promotion was cancelled because the handsets could not be finished on time. An investigation by the San Francisco Chronicle revealed that sample versions of Hop-On's cell phones were actually modified Nokia handsets; Hop-On was having problems with its own design. Customers who were to receive the cell phones received a $30 check and a free DVD, instead.

== Release ==
Jurassic Park III premiered at the Universal Amphitheater in Los Angeles, California, on July 16, 2001; two days later the film was released in the United States and other countries. Neill, a resident of New Zealand, hosted the film's Australasian premiere in the city of Dunedin in August.

The film was released on VHS and DVD on December 11, 2001. It was simultaneously released with the previous films as the Jurassic Park Trilogy box collection, followed by the Jurassic Park Adventure Pack in November 2005. In 2011, the film was released as part of the Jurassic Park: Ultimate Trilogy Blu-ray collection. Jurassic Park III is also included in the Jurassic Park 4K UHD Blu-ray collection, which was released on May 22, 2018.

== Reception ==
=== Box office ===
Jurassic Park III grossed $19 million on its opening day. At the time, it had the second-highest Wednesday opening of any film, after Star Wars: Episode I – The Phantom Menace. In just five days, it generated a total of $80.9 million. The film had also grossed $50.3 million during its three-day opening weekend. When the film opened, it had the third-highest July opening weekend, behind Men in Black and X-Men. This marked the first time that four consecutive films had made an opening weekend over $45 million, joining Planet of the Apes, Rush Hour 2 and American Pie 2. Additionally, it was one of the four consecutive Universal films of 2001 to gross $40 million in their opening weekends, with The Mummy Returns, The Fast and the Furious and American Pie 2 being the others. The film ultimately earned $181.2 million in the United States and $368.8 million worldwide, making it the eighth-highest-grossing film of the year worldwide and a box office success, but the lowest-grossing film in the franchise.

=== Critical response ===
On Rotten Tomatoes, the film holds an approval rating of 49% based on 222 reviews, with an average rating of 5.30/10. The site's critics consensus reads: "Jurassic Park III is darker and faster than its predecessors, but that doesn't quite compensate for the franchise's continuing creative decline." On Metacritic, the film has a weighted average score of 42 out of 100, based on 30 critics, indicating "mixed or average" reviews. Audiences polled by CinemaScore gave the film an average grade of "B−" on an A+ to F scale. On Metacritic, it was the lowest-rated film of the Jurassic Park franchise until the release of Jurassic World Dominion in 2022 and remains the lowest rated film in the original Jurassic Park trilogy. The film's distributor Universal did not allow reviews to be published until the film's release.

Entertainment Weekly's Owen Gleiberman, who praised the previous Jurassic Park films, awarded the third film a C grade, writing "Jurassic Park III has no pretensions to be anything more than a goose-bumpy fantasy theme-park ride for kids, but it's such a routine ride. Spielberg's wizardry is gone, and his balletic light touch as well, and that gives too much of this 90-minute movie over to the duller-than-dull characters". Desson Thomson of The Washington Post said, "Sure, the dinosaurs look awesome -- but only in passing. For much of the time, they are shown in close-up shots, a sure sign of cost-cutting. And they come and go, like video game creations". Derek Elley of Variety called the film "an all-action, helter-skelter, don't-forget-to-buy-the-computer-game ride that makes the two previous installments look like models of classic filmmaking". Ben Varkontine of PopMatters said it was "not as good a ride as the first, but a damn sight better than the second". Apollo Movie Guide panned the film as being "almost the same as the first movie" with "no need for new ideas or even a script". Empire gave the film 3 stars out of 5, calling it "short, scrappy and intermittently scary".

On Ebert and Roeper, Richard Roeper gave it a Thumbs Down while Roger Ebert awarded a Thumbs Up. In a subsequent review, Ebert called it "the best blockbuster of the Summer". In his written review, Ebert gave the film three stars and said it "is not as awe-inspiring as the first film or as elaborate as the second, but in its own B-movie way it's a nice little thrill machine". He also wrote: "I can't praise it for its art, but I must not neglect its craft, and on that basis I recommend it". Paleontologist Robert T. Bakker, an early pioneer of the dinosaur-bird connection, said the feather quills added to the Velociraptor "looked like a roadrunner's toupee", but conceded that feathers are difficult subjects for computer animation and speculated that Jurassic Park IV's raptors would have more realistic plumage. Spielberg, according to his spokesman, was "very happy" with Johnston's work on the film. In 2002, Crichton said he had not watched the film. Some fans of the series were upset with the decision to kill off the T. rex and replace it with a new dinosaur.

=== Retrospective assessments ===
Some later reviews of the film have been positive, with some critics declaring it superior to The Lost World: Jurassic Park. Retrospective reviews have also praised the aviary sequence. Simon Brew, writing for Den of Geek, stated in 2007 that the film has "an efficiency and focus" that was missing in the previous film. He enjoyed the set pieces, but criticized the abrupt ending. Comparing the first film with Jurassic Park III, David Chen of /Film wrote in 2009 that the original managed to "thrill audiences and make them think", while the latter "did neither particularly well".

Several critics reviewed the film in 2015, when Jurassic World was released. Justin Harp of Digital Spy wrote that despite the shortcomings of Jurassic Park III, it "remains immensely watchable and visually impressive. It manages to strike a clear balance between moments of terror and genuine laughs". Although Harp considered the film to be the black sheep of the series, he described it as "fresh, exciting and, most of all, a whole lot of fun". Matt Goldberg of Collider wrote that the film "doesn't really have any reason to exist beyond proving that the franchise maybe never should have been a franchise to begin with". He stated that the film "is overly excited to let you know [the raptors] can vocally speak to each other, which ends up just looking funny. It feels like we're missing subtitles". Zaki Hasan of Sequart Organization enjoyed the film, but wrote that it has issues such as the abrupt ending.

Entertainment Weekly, in 2018, wrote "what the plot lacks in credibility it makes up for with relatability". The magazine praised it as the only film in the series that "has zero to do with scientific stupidity or sinister corporate forces", writing that it was "perhaps the most narratively original" film out of all them. Jim Vorel, writing for Paste in 2022, stated that the film "essentially aspires to nothing more than to put a few monsters on screen, a goal at which it admittedly succeeds." He went on to call it "a rushed, chaotic" film that "only briefly dallies with new concepts but is largely content to simply rehash series highlights as it provides just enough action to get it past basic standards for viability as an early 2000s blockbuster." Examining the film in 2025, Susana Polo of Polygon described it as an unintentional parody of the Jurassic Park franchise.

Neill continued to defend the film until his passing in 2026. In 2011, he stated: "I really like the third film, I'm very proud of it, and I think it works really well. It moves like an express train... I think it's a bloody good film!" He further said in 2021 that he considered his performance in the third film superior to the first, and that he believes the newer film is "dismissed too easily", aside from its "hurried" ending.

== Accolades ==
Award	Date of ceremony	Category	Recipient(s)	Result	Ref(s)
BMI Film Awards	May 15, 2002	Best Music	Don Davis and John Williams	Won	
Golden Raspberry Awards	March 23, 2002	Worst Remake or Sequel		Nominated	
Golden Reel Awards	March 23, 2002	Best Sound Editing – Effects & Foley		Nominated	
Golden Trailer Awards	2002	Best Horror/Thriller Film		Nominated	
Satellite Awards	January 19, 2002	Best Visual Effects	Jim Mitchell	Nominated	
Satellite Awards	January 19, 2002	Best Sound	Howell Gibbens	Nominated	
Saturn Awards	June 10, 2002	Best Science Fiction Film		Nominated	
Saturn Awards	June 10, 2002	Best Special Effects		Nominated	
Stinkers Bad Movie Awards	2002	Worst Actress	Tea Leoni	Nominated	
Stinkers Bad Movie Awards	2002	Worst Screenplay for a Film Grossing More Than $100 Million Worldwide Using Hollywood Math		Nominated	
Stinkers Bad Movie Awards	2002	Worst Sequel		Nominated	

== Sequel ==
The next film in the series, Jurassic World, was released in 2015, after a lengthy development period. It was directed by Colin Trevorrow, with Spielberg again serving as executive producer. It launched the Jurassic World series. Neill and Dern reprised their roles in the third installment, Jurassic World Dominion, released in 2022.

== See also ==
- List of films featuring dinosaurs
