= The Winter Soldier (novel) =

2018 novel by Daniel Mason

- Author: Daniel Mason
- Genre: Realistic fiction, Historical fiction
- Publisher: Little, Brown and Company
- Publication date: September 11, 2018
- Publication place: United States
- ISBN: 978-0-316-47760-4

The Winter Soldier is a 2018 historical novel written by Daniel Mason. Set in 1914 Vienna, it tells the story of Lucius, a 22-year-old medical student, and a field hospital nurse following the outbreak of World War I. The novel focuses on themes including war, historical medical practices, family, and the role of chance in the formation of relationships, history and penance. It also describes the origins and early treatment of what Mason describes as "a new disease, born of the war", post traumatic stress disorder.

Since the book's release Mason has stated that the book's title refers to both the character of Horvath and the main character Lucius, remarking “Even though the diagnostic mystery is Horvath, my interest is in who Lucius is. The title refers to both of them. But the real winter soldier is the doctor and the real investigation is of his trauma and regret.”

== Synopsis ==
Set during World War I, the book follows Lucius, a medical student and son of wealthy parents. Disappointed that their son did not choose a more illustrious career, they are pleased when war breaks out and Lucius enlists in the military, expecting that he will redeem himself to them via battle. For his part, Lucius chooses to enlist because the war had been romanticized to him and his college offered early graduation for anyone willing to enlist. Lucius is surprised when he receives a position at a poorly staffed and equipped field hospital located in a church in the Carpathian Mountains, as this was the opposite of what he was expecting. He also finds that he is the outpost's only physician and that the other doctors abandoned their post, leaving only Sister Margarete to care for the outpost, which is stricken by typhus. Lucius is somewhat ill-equipped to care for his new charges, as his prior patients had only relatively minor issues and most of his knowledge came from book learning rather than practical experience. Determined to make the best of things, Lucius begins his work. The Sister is willing to help teach Lucius, who begins to grow attached to both her and the others in the hospital.

Not all of his patients are exhibiting easily solved maladies, as some are diagnosed with "nervous shock", and Lucius finds that one of his patients, Horvath – dubbed the "winter soldier" – is displaying strange symptoms that hint at psychological or neurological causes. With few clues and the soldier himself mute and mentally shut off from the world, Lucius decides that he must cure this soldier at all costs. As the book progresses several recovering patients are sent to other hospitals, but Lucius is resistant to the idea of sending away Horvath; this stresses his relationship with Margarete, who is revealed to have lied about being a nun, as she believes that he's doing this for his own benefit and not Horvath's.

Lucius is eventually forced to return to Vienna, where his mother pressures him to marry the daughter of an important man, Natasza. He agrees, despite having fallen in love with Margarete during his time at the church. Lucius had asked her to marry him, but she rebuffed him by running away in tears. This does not stop him from becoming obsessed with determining her whereabouts after the war, especially as his marriage to Natasza is particularly unhappy. He ultimately does discover Margarete, who Lucius finds has married Horvath and bore his child. This allows Lucius to move on with his life, no longer fixated on the couple.

== Development ==
Mason began writing the novel around 2004, with The Winter Soldier taking about fourteen years to complete, during which time he published A Far Country and Death of the Pugilist. Initially he had planned for the book to be set in Freud's Vienna and center around a female patient and her relationships with her doctor and husband. Mason chose to shift the story to a field hospital during World War I while he was performing research for the story, after discovering "this moment in history where the Austro-Hungarian Army finds itself so ill-equipped for the war that they don’t have enough doctors. So they invest in medical students with no clinical training and send them off to hospitals". This resonated with Mason, who had then recently completed his own medical schooling, as he noted: "Most medical students, up until that moment in their lives, haven't suffered an illness as severe as the illnesses they will encounter in their patients. And it sounds so unbelievably naïve, but I don't think I'm the only one whose world is shaken by the duration and the depth of suffering that people go through".

In a first draft, the character of Sister Margarete was a minor character whom Lucius encountered; Mason decided to expand her character more, as he found that he enjoyed writing her scenes. In further rewrites her character was expanded and she was changed from a character who "[walked] around with a gun, speaking in lofty language that lapses into vulgarities" into one that was "more human, quieter", which Mason stated was a challenge.

== Reception ==
Critical reception for The Winter Soldier has been predominantly positive, with the New York Journal of Books praising the book and calling its ending "surprisingly satisfying". Writing for The New York Times, Anthony Marra cited Mason's research and the book's "improbable narrative pleasures" as a highlight, writing "Within the meticulously researched and magnificently realized backdrop of European dissolution, Mason finds his few lost souls, and shepherds them toward an elusive peace." Newsday's Tom Beer opined that while the book "happens to draw on history" it "does what all the best novels do: Creates a world in which readers pleasurably lose themselves." A review in The Washington Post by Ron Charles notes that the "beauty of Daniel Mason's new novel, The Winter Soldier, persists even through scenes of unspeakable agony". The San Francisco Chronicle's Datebook named The Winter Soldier one of the top ten books of 2018 and in a review, praised the attention to detail in the work. It was also placed on The Washington Post's list of "50 notable works of fiction in 2018".

The Herald Scotland reviewed The Winter Soldier, commenting that the work showed that Mason "has honed his craft over two previous novels" and that it was "beautifully, elegantly written, Mason’s prose pitched at a level where it feels rich and lustrous but at the same time transparent and devoid of pomposity."
