= The Piano Tuner =

2002 novel by Daniel Mason

- First edition
- Author: Daniel Mason
- Language: English
- Genre: Historical fiction
- Publisher: Alfred A. Knopf
- Publication date: 2002
- Publication place: United States
- Media type: Print (hardcover & paperback)
- Pages: 368 pp (hardcover); 336 pp (paperback)
- ISBN: 9781400030385
- OCLC: 53051198

The Piano Tuner is a historical novel by American author Daniel Mason, set in British India and Burma. It was first published in 2002 when Mason was 26 and was his first novel.

The Piano Tuner was the basis for a 2004 opera of the same name (composed by Nigel Osborne to a libretto by Amanda Holden).

== Synopsis ==
The novel is set in 1886, in the jungles of Burma. The protagonist, a middle-aged man by the name of Edgar Drake, is commissioned by the British War Office to repair a rare Erard grand piano belonging to a Doctor Anthony Carroll. Carroll, who is the root of many myths, had the piano shipped to him as a means to bring peace and union amongst the princes in Burma in order to further the expansion of the British Empire. The extreme humidity of the tropical climate soon rendered it useless and horribly out of tune. Drake's "mission" thus becomes vital to the Crown's strategic interests. In a series of sub-plots and intrigue the surgeon-major (who?) is charged with treason. When the piano tuner goes to meet the surgeon-major against the wishes of the military staff, he finds himself suddenly surrounded.

== Reception ==
The book has been thematically compared with Conrad's Heart of Darkness. Andrea Barrett, in The New York Times, called the book "thoroughly engaging" and said that the character of Drake was its greatest achievement, though both she, as well as Hermoine Lee in The Guardian, said that the historical digressions in the book were "clumsy" or "sat stiffly".

== Adaptations ==
The novel was adapted into an opera by Nigel Osborne, to a libretto by Amanda Holden, which premiered at the Linbury Studio of the Royal Opera House in 2004.
