= Daniel Mason =

American novelist

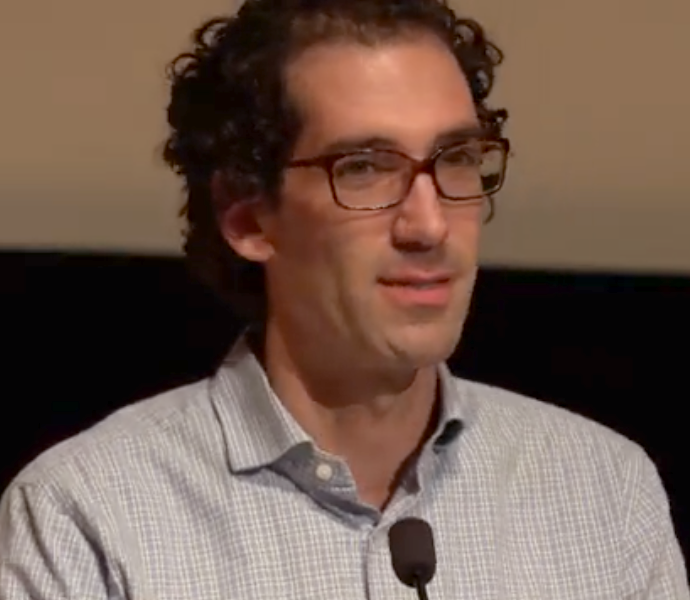
- Daniel Mason accepting a Northern California Book Award at the San Francisco Public Library in 2019
- Born: c. 1976
- Education: Harvard University; UCSF School of Medicine
- Occupations: Writer, physician

Daniel Mason (born c. 1976) is an American novelist and physician. He is the author of The Piano Tuner, A Far Country and North Woods.

== Biography ==
He was raised in Palo Alto, California, and received a BA in biology from Harvard University, later graduating from the UCSF School of Medicine.

He wrote his first novel, The Piano Tuner (2002), while still a medical student. It was later the basis for a 2004 opera of the same name (composed by Nigel Osborne to a libretto by Amanda Holden). Mason's second novel, A Far Country, was published in March 2007. North Woods was published in 2023.

His work has been translated into 28 languages. In May 2020, Mason was the recipient of the Joyce Carol Oates Literary Prize. In 2024 he received a PEN Oakland/Josephine Miles Award for North Woods. North Woods was shortlisted in 2025 for the Dublin Literary Award.

Mason is an Assistant Professor of psychiatry affiliated with Stanford Hospital, and teaches literature at Stanford University. He is married to the novelist Sara Houghteling.

== Books ==
- The Piano Tuner (2002)
- A Far Country (2007)
- Death of the Pugilist, or The Famous Battle of Jacob Burke & Blindman McGraw (2008)
- The Winter Soldier (2018)
- A Registry of My Passage upon the Earth (2020)
- North Woods (2023)
- Country People (2026)

== See also ==
- List of physician writers
