= Jurassic Park III (disambiguation) =

Jurassic Park III could refer to:

- Jurassic Park III, the 2001 feature film and the third film in the series
- Jurassic Park III (score), the musical score to the 2001 film
- Jurassic Park III, the arcade game
- Jurassic Park III: Park Builder, the Game Boy Advance simulation game
- Jurassic Park III: The DNA Factor, the Game Boy Advance side scrolling game
- Jurassic Park III: Island Attack, the Game Boy Advance action game
- Jurassic Park III: Danger Zone!, the 2001 PC action game
- Jurassic Park III: Dino Defender, the 2001 PC action game
