= Jurassic Park 2 =

Jurassic Park 2 may refer to:

- Jurassic Park 2: The Chaos Continues, a 1994 video game and a non-canonical continuation of the Jurassic Park series
- The Lost World (Crichton novel), a 1995 techno-thriller novel written by Michael Crichton
- The Lost World: Jurassic Park, a 1997 American science fiction action film
