= The Lost World: Jurassic Park (Genesis video game) =

1997 video game

- North American box art
- Developer: Appaloosa Interactive
- Publisher: Sega
- Producer: Steve Hutchins
- Designers: David Curtis Hill; Mihály Brudnyák
- Programmer: Ignác Fetser
- Composer: Attila Héger
- Series: Jurassic Park
- Platform: Sega Genesis
- Release: NA: September 16, 1997; EU: 1997
- Genre: Action-adventure
- Modes: Single-player, multiplayer

The Lost World: Jurassic Park is an action-adventure video game developed by Appaloosa Interactive and published by Sega for the Sega Genesis. It was released on September 16, 1997 in North America. By this time the Genesis was near the end of its commercial lifespan, and months went by between new software releases for the console.

The Lost World: Jurassic Park is based on the film of the same name, which in turn is based on the novel by Michael Crichton.

== Gameplay ==
Unlike the previous Jurassic Park games for the Genesis, the game features a bird's-eye view perspective similar to Jurassic Park on the Super NES.

The player assumes the role of an unnamed character who must capture dinosaurs on Isla Sorna, while stopping rival hunters from transporting dinosaurs to the mainland. The game consists of nineteen missions spread across four sections of the island, referred to as Sites One through Four. Boss levels must be played at the end of each Site in order to advance to the next Site.

Two players can work together in Cooperative Mode, or work against each other in Competitive Mode. Weapons such as a taser, tranquilizer gun, shotgun and grenades can be used against hunters and dinosaurs. At times, the player can control vehicles such as an SUV and a hovercraft.

== Reception ==
Reception

Review scores
Publication	Score
Game Informer	8.25/10
HobbyConsolas	90/100
Superjuegos	94/100
Ação Games	9,0/10
Sega Power (GR)	87/100

The Lost World: Jurassic Park on the Sega Genesis received generally favorable reviews. Game Informer considered the game to be more entertaining than the PlayStation/Saturn version and praised the graphics that push the Genesis to its limits, but noted that the slowdown becomes frustrating when there is a lot of action on screen. GamePro's Lawrence Neves found the game's visuals unimpressive by Genesis standards, citing muted colors, simple backgrounds, and small sprites. Neves also described the gameplay as boring.

== See also ==
- Jurassic Park video games
- The Lost World: Jurassic Park (video game), a listing of games based on The Lost World: Jurassic Park
