= Warpath: Jurassic Park =

1999 video game

- European cover art
- Developer: Black Ops Entertainment
- Publishers: Electronic Arts; DreamWorks Interactive
- Composer: Michael Giacchino
- Series: Jurassic Park
- Platform: PlayStation
- Release: NA: November 17, 1999; UK: December 17, 1999
- Genre: Fighting
- Modes: Single-player, multiplayer

Warpath: Jurassic Park is a 1999 fighting video game developed by Black Ops Entertainment and co-published by Electronic Arts and DreamWorks Interactive for the PlayStation. It is a spin-off of the films Jurassic Park (1993) and The Lost World: Jurassic Park (1997), which in turn were adapted from novels written by Michael Crichton.

== Gameplay ==
Warpath is a fighting game. The player can choose a dinosaur to fight with against other dinosaurs. The player starts with eight dinosaurs, including T. rex, Giganotosaurus, Ankylosaurus, Stygimoloch, and Styracosaurus. Six additional dinosaurs can be unlocked in Arcade mode, including Carcharodontosaurus, Cryolophosaurus, Pachycephalosaurus, Spinosaurus, and Triceratops. Each dinosaur has its own array of fighting techniques and style.

The game includes various arenas that recreate locations from the first two films, such as the T. rex enclosure from Jurassic Park and the S.S. Venture deck from The Lost World: Jurassic Park. Some arenas feature destructible objects such as boxes, which will hurt the dinosaurs when they break them. Optionally, various edible creatures (goats, humans, dogs, and Compsognathus) will scurry across the arena, partially replenishing lost health when eaten or killed by one of the fighters.

The game features a variety of modes:

- The main mode is Arcade. In this mode the player must face each dinosaur in the game through 8 fights. This mode has a time limit and round limit, though it can be changed in the options menu.
- Versus mode has the player going up against a second player. The players can choose the dinosaur and the arena. If the second player chooses the same dinosaur the skin changes to an alternative.
- Practice mode allows the player to try out moves and train against any dinosaur. The player can change the stance of the opponent to jumping, crouched or on ground. The opponent can also attack, but the player cannot die as it is just a simulation.
- Survival mode has the player going up against all dinosaurs in the same manner as a survival mode. A small amount of health is rewarded to the player for each dinosaur defeated. The object of this mode is to defeat all dinosaurs before the player's health meter is depleted.
- Choice mode is the same as Versus mode, except the player fights a CPU-controlled dinosaur.
- Team mode is a mix of Survival and Versus modes, but with a team of up to four dinosaurs. The object of this mode is to defeat all of the opposing team's dinosaurs. Once a dinosaur is defeated, it is eliminated and another dinosaur will take its place until all dinosaurs on either team are eliminated.
- Museum is a semi-educational mode that allows the player to browse through the dinosaurs and read or hear information on each one. The player can view the dinosaur's family, time of existence, and do other things like change its skin or hear pronunciation.

== Featured dinosaurs ==
At the start of the game, the player has only a limited amount of choices (8 in total) for playable dinosaurs. As the game progresses, the player is presented the opportunity to unlock new playable characters bringing the total of available dinosaurs up to 14. Each dinosaur is associated with its own area, which —as the player starts the combat— features a small entering animation of the dinosaur that the player is about to fight. Since the game predated the third movie, Jurassic Park III, only scenarios from the first two movies are featured.

=== Available from the start ===
- Acrocanthosaurus (Acro) - Featuring a 76 gas station from the second movie.
- Ankylosaurus (Anky) - Featuring the Visitors Centre of the first movie.
- Giganotosaurus (Giga) - Featuring the T. rex Paddock Area of the first movie.
- Megaraptor (Raptor) - Featuring the Velociraptor Paddock Area of the first movie.
- Stygimoloch (Stygi) - Featuring the Lab Area of Site B from the second movie.
- Styracosaurus (Styrac) - Featuring the Heliport Landing Zone from the first movie.
- Suchomimus (Sucho) - Featuring the Park Entrance Area from the first movie.
- Tyrannosaurus rex (T. rex) - Featuring the Cargo Ship from the second movie.

=== Unlockable ===
- Albertosaurus (Alberto) - Featuring a Universal Studios Theme Park as an Easter-egg/Video game-only area.
- Carcharodontosaurus (Carchar) - Featuring the jungle beneath the T. rex Paddock from the first movie.
- Cryolophosaurus (Cryo) - Featuring a desert area. Video game-only area.
- Pachycephalosaurus (Pachy) - Featuring a mountainous area. Video game-only area.
- Spinosaurus (Spino) - Featuring the In-Gen Laboratory from the first movie.
- Triceratops (Trike) - Featuring the Hunters Camp Area from the second movie.

== Development and release ==
Warpath: Jurassic Park was developed by Black Ops Entertainment. Although the dinosaurs are based on their real-life counterparts, artistic license was also used to give the animals unique abilities for gameplay purposes. Each of the dinosaurs consist of 750 polygons. The game's musical score was composed by Michael Giacchino, who previously worked on the 1997 video game The Lost World: Jurassic Park. Electronic Arts published the game. In the U.S. it was released on November 17, 1999.

== Reception ==
Reception

Aggregate score
| Aggregator | Score |
|---|---|
| GameRankings | 57% |

Review scores
| Publication | Score |
|---|---|
| AllGame | 2.5/5 |
| CNET Gamecenter | 6/10 |
| Electronic Gaming Monthly | 4/10 (Note: In Electronic Gaming Monthly's review of the game, one critic gave it 5/10, another gave it 3/10, and the rest gave it each a score of 4/10.) |
| EP Daily | 7.5/10 |
| Game Informer | 6.75/10 |
| GameFan | 45% (Note: In GameFan's viewpoint of the game, three critics gave it each a score of 47, 58, and 30.) (G.N.) 43% |
| GameSpot | 4.7/10 |
| IGN | 5.5/10 |
| Next Generation | 1/5 |
| PlayStation Official Magazine – UK | 4/10 |
| Official U.S. PlayStation Magazine | 2/5 |

Warpath received mixed reviews. The game was compared unfavorably to Primal Rage by GameSpot and IGN. Adam Pavlacka of NextGen wrote, "History has shown that the Jurassic Park license spells doom for any game it touches, and Warpath is no exception."

Glenn Wigmore of AllGame praised the game's dinosaur animations, and most of its interactive level designs for their resemblance to locations that were featured in the films, but criticized other levels for their "bland building textures and rushed backgrounds." Wigmore found the gameplay to be "downright sluggish" and considered the music to be "too low and emotionless," and opined that cutscenes for each dinosaur "would've been a nice extra for the game's overall feel and replay value." James Mielke of GameSpot also praised the dinosaurs, but criticized the levels for glitching, writing: "Surfaces buckle and distortion abounds as the PlayStation struggles to keep all this geometry under control."

Erik Reppen of Game Informer wrote, "Graphically, it's not a bad game. Unfortunately, the concept leaves much to be desired," noting that the gameplay "gets old rather quickly when you realize that the AI of the game is about the size of a peanut, and you can finish it with two moves." Scary Larry of GamePro praised the graphics and sound in one review, but criticized the game's "complex button patterns," writing, "By the time you master the combos, you'll be in the mood to play something else." (Note: GamePro gave the game 4/5 for graphics, 4.5/5 for sound, 3/5 for control, and 3.5/5 for fun factor in one review.) In another GamePro review, however, Major Mike wrote, "For the very curious, this Jurassic Park fighting game is worth a rental. Purchasers will go on the Warpath for a refund." (Note: GamePro gave the game two 4/5 scores for graphics and sound, 3/5 for control, and 2/5 for fun factor in another review.)

Marc Nix of IGN criticized the game's dinosaurs for their lack of size disparity, writing: "The T-Rex is a dwarf, while raptors have become mega-raptors of roughly the same size as the beast who bit regular raptors in half in the film." Nix also criticized the game's AI and bad collision detection, and noted that each dinosaur played similarly to one another. However, Nix praised the game's graphics and levels.
