= Jurassic Park: Operation Genesis =

2003 video game

- Developer: Blue Tongue Entertainment
- Publisher: Universal Interactive
- Director: Kevin Chan
- Producer: Nick Hagger
- Designer: Nick Hagger
- Programmers: Steven Spagnolo; Shane Stevens; Graeme Webb
- Composer: Stephan Schütze
- Series: Jurassic Park
- Platforms: Windows, PlayStation 2, Xbox
- Release: Windows: NA: March 12, 2003; EU: March 28, 2003; JP: July 31, 2003; PlayStation 2, Xbox: NA: March 25, 2003; EU: March 28, 2003; JP: October 16, 2003 (PS2 only)
- Genre: Theme park simulation
- Mode: Single-player

Jurassic Park: Operation Genesis is a construction and management simulation video game based on the Jurassic Park franchise. It was developed by Blue Tongue Entertainment and published by Universal Interactive. The game was released for Windows, Xbox, and PlayStation 2. Its primary objective is to establish and operate a five-star dinosaur theme park on custom-generated islands. Players hatch and manage dinosaurs, construct attractions and facilities, entertain visitors, and maintain park security while developing the park's rating and profitability.

Development of the game began in 2001 and lasted 22 months. It was formally announced in February 2002, with its release initially scheduled for later that year. The game was ultimately released in North America and the PAL region in March 2003, followed by a Japanese release later that year. According to Metacritic, the Windows and Xbox versions received "Mixed or average" reviews, while the PlayStation 2 version received "Generally favorable" reviews.

Jurassic World Evolution, a 2018 video game developed and published by Frontier Developments, features similar construction and management gameplay and has been described as a spiritual successor to Jurassic Park: Operation Genesis. Two sequels, Jurassic World Evolution 2 and Jurassic World Evolution 3, were released in 2021 and 2025, respectively.

== Gameplay ==
The player's main objective is to create an animal theme park featuring dinosaurs, make it popular, and make it safe with a 5-star rating. Gameplay functions are very similar to the SimCity and Zoo Tycoon game models. It is necessary to build feeding stations where herbivores can get bales of plant feed, while carnivores are fed live cows and goats. However, herbivores become unhappy if they don't have enough trees around them or enough nearby dinosaurs to socialize with. Likewise, carnivores have an innate desire to hunt other dinosaurs, so even a constant stream of livestock will not keep them happy.

To create a dinosaur, fifty percent (50%) of the particular dinosaur's DNA is needed. The higher the percentage of DNA, the longer that dinosaur will live, unless it dies by unnatural causes, such as malnutrition or being attacked by another dinosaur. To obtain a dinosaur's DNA, the player must extract it through fossils or amber. Higher quality specimens will yield more DNA.

To obtain fossils and amber, the player must send a fossil-hunting team to dig in one of nine dig sites around the world. Additional dig teams can be purchased later in the game. Each dig site contains fossils from three particular dinosaurs. Fossils of some dinosaurs, such as Brachiosaurus, can be found in more than one dig site. The chance of finding fossils depends on the quality of the site. There are 6 classifications on the quality of a dig site, ranging from "excellent" to "exhausted." It is still possible to find fossils and amber at sites that have been exhausted, although they are often of low quality with little DNA to provide. Valuable items such as silver, gold, or opal are also discovered infrequently by the dig team(s), and can be sold for profit.

Attractions help make the park popular, and increase its rating power and income when correctly configured. Attractions must be researched before they can be constructed, and include the Balloon Tour, Safari Adventure and Viewing Dome. Viewing Vents and Viewing Platforms do not need to be researched. The Safari Tour and Balloon Tour attractions allow for the player to "take over" the ride for the purpose of park exploration and photography, but only when a visitor in the game is using it. The player may also observe the dinosaurs from the Viewing Dome, Viewing Vent, and Viewing Platform by selecting the "View" option after clicking on the building.

Amenities such as restrooms and restaurants are needed for visitors. Additional buildings such as a gift shop and a resting area must be researched before the player can add them into the park. Vaccines for diseases–such as tick infestation, gastric poisoning, rabies (though only mammals are significantly affected by rabies in real life), and the fictional Dino Flu (possibly a nod to bird flu)–must be researched before a sick dinosaur can be treated for a particular illness.

=== Dinosaurs ===
There are a total of 25 species of dinosaurs featured in the game, some of which were featured in the films. The dinosaurs are divided into four main sub-groups. Small herbivores such as Gallimimus and Pachycephalosaurus are easy to care for and do not take up much space, but are not as popular with guests. Large Herbivores such as Brachiosaurus and Triceratops are very popular with visitors and do not require expensive fences, but need large spacious exhibits. Small carnivores such as Dilophosaurus and Velociraptor do not generally need tight security like their larger counterparts, but can still harm guests if they escape. Large carnivores such as Spinosaurus and Tyrannosaurus rex are the most popular dinosaurs in the game, but require large exhibits with high security fences and are prone to rampaging when stressed.

=== Missions ===
A view of a stressed Carcharodontosaurus from a ranger helicopter.

The game has 10 missions the player can complete. There are about three or four general types of missions, including taking photographs of dinosaurs to try to rack up a certain number of points from the photos in a safari mission and dinosaur control missions where the player has to retire the carnivores (preferably large ones) to protect the herbivores.

=== Site B ===
After all the missions are completed, the "Site B" mode is unlocked, which allows the player to create an island without any fences or buildings for people. Visitors are not allowed on the island. The player can place up to eight hatcheries and create up to sixty dinosaurs, which live on the island without diseases or the possibility of becoming stressed. As long as they have food, water and living space, the player can simply watch the dinosaurs interact and live out their lives.

== Development and release ==
Operation Genesis was developed by Blue Tongue Entertainment, based in Australia. Universal had been impressed with the company's previous game, Starship Troopers: Terran Ascendancy (2000). Blue Tongue was among five other international companies considered. Development of the game began in 2001, and lasted 22 months. Early in development, a total of 40 dinosaurs were planned for inclusion in the game. This number was later reduced to 25 due to scheduling issues, as well as the developers choosing to focus more on fewer dinosaurs that were well known from the Jurassic Park films. Marine reptiles and pterosaurs were among those removed from the game. The developers conducted research into the behavior of dinosaurs whose behavior had not been specified in the films. Bird sounds were used for some dinosaurs that did not appear in the films.

The game was first announced as Jurassic Park: Project Genesis on February 19, 2002, with the game's release set for the fourth quarter of 2002. In April 2002, it was announced that the game would be co-published with Konami in Japan. On May 22, footage was shown at the Electronic Entertainment Expo (E3), where the game was titled as Jurassic Park: The Game. Blue Tongue Entertainment pushed for that to be the final title. In June, the game's release date was set for December 2002.

Baby dinosaurs were being planned midway through development. They were scrapped for scheduling reasons; implementing them would have required the creation of new models and A.I. This ended plans for a dinosaur petting zoo. Buildings such as a hotel, a hunting platform and a dinosaur vet station were removed from the final game due to design decisions, as well as memory constraints presented on the console versions. The number of missions was also reduced, with 12 originally planned.

Stephan Schütze worked on the game's music, and was tasked with composing a score that sounded similar to those by John Williams, who had composed Jurassic Park and The Lost World: Jurassic Park. Ten original music tracks were written for the game; they were performed by the Melbourne Symphony Orchestra. It was the first orchestral video game score to be recorded in Australia. Two tracks from Williams were also included in the game.

In October, the game's official title was unveiled, with the release date being pushed back to the first quarter of 2003. At that time, a Nintendo GameCube version of the game was planned for release in the third quarter of 2003. In April 2003, Blue Tongue confirmed that the GameCube version had been cancelled, as the development team chose to focus on the PC, PlayStation 2, and Xbox versions instead.

In April 2003, it was announced that Sega would publish the Windows version in Japan.

== Reception ==
Reception

Aggregate score
Aggregator	Score
Metacritic	(PS2) 75/100 (PC) 72/100 (Xbox) 69/100

Review scores
Publication	Score
Electronic Gaming Monthly	7/10
Game Informer	(PS2) 8.75/10 (Xbox) 8.25/10
GamePro	4.5/5
GameSpot	(PC) 7.2/10; 7/10
GameSpy	2/5
GameZone	(PS2) 8/10 (Xbox) 7.5/10 (PC) 6.3/10
IGN	5.9/10
Official U.S. PlayStation Magazine	4.5/5
Official Xbox Magazine (US)	6/10
PC Gamer (US)	70%
Entertainment Weekly	A−

Jurassic Park: Operation Genesis sold in excess of 400,000 copies worldwide by 2008. It ultimately received a "Silver" sales award from the Entertainment and Leisure Software Publishers Association (ELSPA), indicating sales of at least 100,000 copies in the United Kingdom.

According to Metacritic, the Windows and Xbox versions received "Mixed or average" reviews, while the PlayStation 2 version received "Generally favorable" reviews.

Electronic Gaming Monthly offered praise for the game's missions, but also wrote that the game "may be too complex for some [...] getting e-mail notices and warnings every 10 seconds doesn't help [...] you can see the long-term fun is doomed for extinction. Sure, you get a lot to do, but not many ways to do it. You raise all the dinos the same way; you have the same limited park amenities and research options game after game; and you won't experience anything new after playing through an open-ended game once."

Matt Helgeson of Game Informer called the PlayStation 2 version "one of the best console business sims I’ve ever played." Matthew Kato, also from Game Informer, wrote a positive review of the Xbox version, but criticized the game's dinosaurs and humans for a lack of intelligent AI, as well as the lack of a faster game speed. GamePro and Entertainment Weekly praised the game's use of John Williams' Jurassic Park theme.

GameSpot praised the PC version's detailed dinosaur models, weather effects, and camera angles, but criticized the game's imprecise mouse control and complained that the game often locked up when advanced graphics settings (such as reflective water) were turned on. GameSpy criticized the console versions for their "spotty control" and short mission mode, and considered the PC version to be superior because of its lack of freezing.

Reviewing the PC version, GameZone was critical of the game's repetitive player requests and short mission mode. GameZone praised the graphics, but felt the game was too similar to other simulation games. GameZone praised the PlayStation 2 version for its dinosaur animations, but noted its "awkward" camera views.

Reviewing the PlayStation 2 and Xbox versions, IGN praised the game's camera system, but criticized the ability to control the game's Land Cruisers and helicopters, saying they "aren't as engaging as they should be." IGN also noted the graphics to be, "Repetitive and bland". Joe Rybicki of Official U.S. PlayStation Magazine wrote, "I have exactly one complaint: It only took me about eight hours or so to get a 5-star rating, effectively beating the main area of the game. So, it may be a bit too easy for veterans of the genre. But with so much else to do, that's hardly a serious issue."

== See also ==
- Jurassic Park III: Park Builder
- Jurassic World Evolution
- Jurassic World Evolution 2
- Jurassic World Evolution 3
