= Jurassic Park (arcade game) =

1994 video game

- Japanese arcade flyer
- Developer: Sega AM3
- Publisher: Sega
- Directors: Juro Watari; Kenji Kanno
- Programmers: Takeshi Goden; Toshikazu Goi; Kenji Yamamoto; Mari Tsuruzoe; Hideshi Kawatake; Akira Ōe
- Composers: Saeko Sasaki; Maki Morrow
- Series: Jurassic Park
- Platform: Arcade
- Release: JP: February 1994; NA: June 1994
- Genre: Rail shooter
- Modes: Single-player, multiplayer
- Arcade system: Sega System 32

Jurassic Park is a 1994 rail shooter video game developed by Sega AM3 and published by Sega for arcades, based on the 1993 film of the same name. The player(s), equipped with the joystick(s), must shoot dinosaurs that appear on-screen throughout the game. The game's graphics blend two-dimensional sprites and three-dimensional polygons to give the sense of movement, making it the first game of its genre to include 3D environments. The arcade cabinet resembles the rear of the first-gen Ford Explorer XLT tour vehicles used in the film. The game includes a moving seat, also used in Sega's 1991 light gun shooter Rail Chase. The seat is powered by hydraulic pistons to move the seat according to action on the screen.

The game was followed by two arcade sequels: The Lost World: Jurassic Park in 1997, and Jurassic Park III in 2001. Another arcade game, titled Jurassic Park Arcade, was released in 2015 and is based on the first three films in the Jurassic Park series.

== Gameplay ==
The game takes place on Isla Nublar a few months after the events of the film. The player(s) fend(s) off a vehicle from dinosaur attacks with infinite automatic weaponry. A joystick is used to play, rather than a light gun. Dinosaurs include Tyrannosaurus, Velociraptor, Dilophosaurus, Gallimimus, Brachiosaurus, Ankylosaurus and Triceratops as well as the non-dinosaur creatures such as ichthyosaurs and pterosaurs. Tyrannosaurus is the only boss enemy in the game.

Fences and large rocks that block the path of the player(s) must be shot at to avoid running into them. The game ends with the dinosaurs being caged once again.

== Reception ==
In Japan, Game Machine listed Jurassic Park as the third most successful upright/cockpit arcade game of March 1994.

Edge called the game a "shameful Line of Fire/Rail Chase-style shoot 'em up". Reviewers for Games World: The Magazine rated it 63 out of 100, and also compared it to Rail Chase. They commended the graphics but found that the gameplay soon becomes repetitive.

Shacknews reviewed the game in 2016, and found the graphics outdated compared to other arcade games of the mid-1990s. Shacknews considered the gameplay to be "pretty mindless" for an on-rail shooter, stating that the game could have used more time in development. In 2021, Daniel Kurland of Comic Book Resources called it an "excellent cooperative experience" and stated "the Jeep-like arcade cabinet is a simple but effective touch".

== See also ==
- Jurassic Park
- List of Jurassic Park video games
