= Jurassic Park: Survival =

- Jurassic Park: Survival logo
- Developer: Savage Entertainment
- Publishers: Vivendi, Konami
- Designers: Felix Kupis; Michael Kirkbride
- Programmer: John Lafleur
- Artist: Rob Stahl
- Series: Jurassic Park
- Platforms: GameCube, Microsoft Windows, PlayStation 2, Xbox
- Release: Cancelled
- Genre: Action-adventure
- Mode: Single-player

Jurassic Park: Survival is a canceled action-adventure video game that was in development by Savage Entertainment and was to be published by Konami. Based upon the Jurassic Park franchise, the game was to be released on the PlayStation 2 and Xbox in November 2001. It was also planned for Microsoft Windows and GameCube.

Development began in October 2000. Initially, the game was to be based on the 2001 film Jurassic Park III. However, the film was in production at that time and could not provide visual reference to the game's development teams, who had to devise their own designs and ideas. Vivendi Universal ultimately decided that the game would only be inspired by the film, rather than based on it, and subsequently chose to include elements not featured in the film. In July 2001, Savage ended development due to payment conflicts with Vivendi Universal, which was dissatisfied with the progress of the game. In North America, the game was expected to receive a Teen rating.

== Gameplay ==
Jurassic Park: Survival was to be played from a third-person perspective with David Vaughn, a member of a security team, as the main character. The game would have taken place on an island of genetically engineered dinosaurs. Gameplay was described as being similar to the Tomb Raider games. Chacko Sonny, a founder of Savage Entertainment, described the company's goal on the gameplay as "Die-Hard meets Jurassic Park". In its preview video, gameplay appeared similar to a survival horror game, with additional action-adventure elements such as climbing, crawling, rolling, shoot rolling, jumping and swimming, as well as other platforming strategies to outwit the dinosaurs instead of trying to take them head on.

Vaughn's enemies would have included eight dinosaur species and four different types of military officers. A fictionalized version of Troodon with glowing eyes would have been featured in the game, and was later implemented into Jurassic Park: The Game (2011). Dinosaur AI was meant to be an integral part of the game; dinosaurs would be able to lure the main character into traps, hunt in packs, and retreat for reinforcements if needed.

Vaughn's weapons would have included a pistol, an electric prod, and a grenade launcher. Vaughn would also carry a PDA with him, which could be used to contact team members for assistance. An item known as the "phero pack" could also be carried around and dropped in certain locations to lure dinosaurs to Vaughn's human enemies and attack them. Puzzles would play a major role in the game. Stealth was also a significant part of gameplay, as Vaughn could complete objectives easier by avoiding detection from guards and spotlights while inside enemy encampments. Vaughn could also use computer terminals located throughout the game to access security cameras for a better view of the area and nearby enemies.

The game would have featured 12 large levels, located in swamps, dense forests, huge caves and networks of tunnels, military outposts, a marina, a terrorist camp, jungles, a hatchery, and a large aviary used to house Pteranodon. The game's dark cave level would involve Vaughn using a mining helmet equipped with lighting to find his way through. Players could proceed through the levels in any order, and a tram would have been used to transport Vaughn from one location to another. A driving mode was also planned, in which Vaughn could commandeer vehicles located throughout the island. In a canyon cliff level, Vaughn would be able to take control of an all-terrain vehicle as part of an ensuing chase through a dense jungle. In another instance, Vaughn would drive a Jeep being chased by a Tyrannosaurus.

== Plot ==
According to IGN, the game's story would have involved a secret third island – after Isla Nublar and Isla Sorna – where wild dinosaurs roam while others are contained in security areas. The U.S. Government, concerned about dinosaur overpopulation, sends a security team to the island to aid scientists who are studying the animals' behavior. David Vaughn, the main character, is among the security team. A "shadow organization", interested in dinosaur DNA, locates a government insider on the security team and launches an attack, taking full control of the island. Vaughn goes on to explore the island and rescue scientists and other security members.

According to GameSpot, David Vaughn would have been a security officer at the now-closed Jurassic Park, where his job would be to prevent dinosaurs from escaping the island and multiplying. Unknown to Vaughn, his boss and head of security on the island has made a deal with a shadow corporation to supply it with dinosaur DNA, followed by the destruction of the island to give the corporation an edge in DNA research. Vaughn's mission would be to keep the dinosaurs on the island while rescuing his security co-workers.

According to PlanetPS2, the game would have been set on Isla Sorna, with Vaughn as a security design technician.

== Development ==
Konami and Universal announced the game in September 2000, under the title of Jurassic Park III, to be based on the upcoming 2001 film of the same name. Jurassic Park III was described as an action-adventure game, and was to be published by Konami for a fall 2001 release on GameCube, PlayStation 2, and Xbox. A PC version was also announced. Konami revealed that the Xbox version of the game would be titled Jurassic Park X.

In October, Savage was announced to develop the game. The game's artificial intelligence (A.I.) software engineer, Joseph Nunn, began designing and programming the game's A.I. that month. Savage Entertainment's COO and co-owner, John Lefleur, served as the project's leader and as a programmer.

The game was officially unveiled as Jurassic Park: Survival in May 2001, with no relation to Jurassic Park III, although the game was to include memorable scenes from each film in the Jurassic Park series. To develop the game, Savage utilized their new high-performance game engine, codenamed "Sabertooth" and also known as "Fang". The engine was developed concurrently with the game. It would have been the first Sabertooth-developed PlayStation 2 video game to be released. Swingin' Ape Studios worked with Savage to help create levels and other aspects of the game, including its ATV level. Michael Kirkbride, the game's senior designer and artist, designed game objects, puzzles, and levels for the game. Felix Kupis, another senior designer, worked on the levels' layouts using 3DS Max.

Art director Rob Stahl developed the visual design of the game's levels, buildings, vehicles, and weapons based on what was featured in the series' first two films, Jurassic Park and The Lost World: Jurassic Park, as the third film was still in production and could not provide visual reference. Stahl also co-created gameplay scenarios and worked with the engineering team to develop Savage's game engine. Stahl said Jurassic Park: Survival was "one of the more challenging" projects he had worked on: "In a lot of ways it was the worst because I was taking design ques from the other two films as far as some of the props, locations, and stuff but this was supposed to be an official game that ties or is in conjunction with Jurassic Park III so I really had to have something [from that film] to base my stuff on. But we just kind of had to wing it to a certain point. But I think that at a point we would have had to have gone back and fix a lot of stuff".

Stahl also said "every couple months we'd be told that they accepted how we had designed things and it was okay, because it was going to be a game inspired by the movie. But they were sort of deciding where that line was. At a certain point I think they just wanted us to build stuff, and they thought it would all match up and then when it became an issue they sort of accepted the fact that the game was going to be an 'inspired by', then I think they tried to put other stuff and other scenarios in that weren't going to be in the film. It just sort of became sort of smushed together, and ended up losing momentum". Stahl said another challenge was creating the illusion that the game's levels were larger than they actually were.

Each dinosaur's mesh data was based on models created by Stan Winston, followed by high resolution photographs being taken of the models to help create the game's dinosaur graphics. Each of the game's dinosaur models used a maximum of 1,500 polygons, a low number for the PlayStation 2. This allowed the game more polycounts for its large levels. During the final months of development, one of the last levels designed for the game was its aviary location, which was based on a scene in the film. The game utilized motion capture technology, which was overseen by Giant Studios. The game also utilized cinematic scenes, which were created by Tigar Hare Studios.

The game was to use the same dinosaur sounds from Jurassic Park III, and Universal was also in the process of negotiating the use of the film's musical score in the game.

== Planned release, promotion, and cancellation ==
The PlayStation 2 and Xbox versions were scheduled for release on November 14, 2001.

The first screenshots from the game were released in May 2001, followed by a trailer unveiled at the Electronic Entertainment Expo (E3). In June, Universal announced they had partnered with advertising agency Kovel-Fuller to create a multimillion-dollar advertising campaign for the game, consisting of national television and printed ads. The game's trailer was released on the Jurassic Park III soundtrack CD. Universal also considered in-theater promotion, and planned to include the game's trailer on VHS and DVD copies of the third film. New screenshots for the game were released throughout July 2001, and the game was expected to be showcased at a Universal gaming event in early August.

At the end of July, Savage announced that they were no longer working on the game. Universal had been dissatisfied with the game's progress, including its poor animations. By September, the game's release date was delayed to January 2002.

Savage confirmed on November 5 they were no longer working on the game due to conflicts of Vivendi-Universal not providing funding to Savage. A spokesperson for Savage later said: "We were looking forward to finishing [Survival] up and getting it on the market [...]. Unfortunately, we can't finish it without funding to pay our people and Universal wasn't providing that". On November 19, a Universal spokesperson reportedly told a Jurassic Park fansite that progress on the game would continue with a different developer, with an expected release sometime in 2002. According to Universal: "We simply weren't happy with the progress of the game and we felt that it deserved more time with a new developer". The website was later asked to remove the quote, as Universal claimed it was "not an official statement".

Later that month, a Savage spokesperson said a new developer would probably start from scratch on the game, and speculated that Universal had not yet found a new developer. The spokesperson also said: "Universal has crunched the development cycles of some of its titles in the past and failed to realize that carries with it a necessary compromise on quality. It would be good for them to give the team working on the title sufficient time to do the franchise justice".

== Early reception ==
Although past Jurassic Park video games had been negatively received, several critics previewed Jurassic Park: Survival and believed that it could overcome this trend. In May 2001, IGN's Douglass C. Perry viewed an early version of the game at Savage's studios and said that the team was "off to a magnificent start". Perry, who had been disappointed in the lack of entertaining dinosaur video games up to that point, believed that Universal and Savage had "laid meticulous plans to tackle the dinosaur dilemma once and for all" with Jurassic Park: Survival. Perry wrote that the "smartest thing" the companies did was to create an original storyline unrelated to Jurassic Park III to create a game "first and foremost", calling it a "big step for a movie-centric company such as Universal, but it's a bold one that should hopefully pay off".

Perry was impressed by the large size of the game's dinosaurs and their "visually impressive" skin textures, although he wrote: "For the most part, the amount of detail was not quite staggering, but eye-opening to be sure". Perry concluded that while the game was still in a very early stage of development, "it shows many signs of promise. By straddling the line between free exploration and dinosaur hunting/avoidance, the game looks to provide a great need that Tomb Raider has long since left vacant. At the same time, gamers' appetite for a good dinosaur game has never been quenched. Jurassic Park Survivor [sic] looks like it could very well make its mark in this next generation, and specifically on PlayStation 2 with this hybrid concept. I'm looking forward to it".

Shane Satterfield of GameSpot, who mentioned the "less than satisfying results" of previous Jurassic Park games, wrote that Universal and Savage "are hoping to buck that trend" with Jurassic Park: Survival. He further stated: "Very few movie games end up being successful, perhaps because they try to emulate an experience the player has likely already had". Satterfield wrote that because Savage was creating an original storyline for Jurassic Park: Survival, the company "seems to have the freedom to step outside the conventions of the series and concentrate on making a great game". He concluded that it "is definitely a game to watch as its release date nears".

Chris Leyton of Total Video Games also mentioned the lack of well received Jurassic Park games up to that point, writing that Universal and Savage "are hoping to change that" with Jurassic Park: Survival. Leyton, who wrote that film tie-ins "have a history for being appalling", felt that the game's original storyline was a "bold" decision, "but should end up being the right one", giving Savage "the freedom to step away from the constraints and concentrate on making a good game. [...] Hopefully we'll see the first Jurassic Park game worthy of its license when it ships".

Todd Mowatt of Electric Playground wrote that the previous Jurassic Park games were "anything but stellar – the words 'dinosaur dung' come to mind – so Savage and Universal have their work cut out for them. [...] I am here to tell you that there is hope. So far this game does not look like it will follow in the footsteps of the other now-extinct Jurassic Park licensed videogames".

Ben Turner of PlanetPS2.com said that if Savage could achieve its ambitious graphical goal, then Jurassic Park: Survival "will easily be one of the best-looking games yet seen on the PlayStation 2". Turner, who mentioned the poor quality of most film-based video games, said he was pleasantly surprised by Jurassic Park: Survival and that, "it's shaping up to be a downright excellent game". PSXNetwork, which noted similarities to Dino Crisis and Tomb Raider, wrote that Jurassic Park: Survival "looks like a nice catch for anyone who is a fan of those games", saying that "even without the license, this game could stand alone as a very good game. It has a fresh plot and the graphics and game play to drive it".
