= Jurassic Park (Game Gear video game) =

1993 video game

- North American Game Gear box art
- Developer: Sega
- Publisher: Sega
- Series: Jurassic Park
- Platforms: Game Gear, Master System
- Release: Game Gear: JP: July 30, 1993; NA: September 1993; EU: November 1993; Master System: EU: November 1993
- Genre: Platform
- Mode: Single-player

Jurassic Park (Japanese: ジュラシック・パーク, Hepburn: Jurashikku Pāku) is a 1993 platform game developed and published by Sega for the Game Gear. Another version, with identical gameplay, was also released for the Master System only in Europe. The game is based on the 1993 film of the same name. It was praised for its graphics, but criticized for its short length and easy gameplay.

== Gameplay ==
Jurassic Park is a platform game set at a dinosaur theme park on the fictional island of Isla Nublar. The dinosaurs escape after the failure of the electric fence enclosures, and the player is tasked with rounding up the animals. The game features five areas of Isla Nublar. The player can play the first four areas in any order, but cannot access the final area – Jurassic Park's Visitor Center – until the others are completed. Each area begins with a driving level, played from a side-scrolling perspective, as the player shoots at oncoming dinosaurs.

The player then proceeds on foot, and is armed with three weapons. The player can jump and hang from ledges. Medical kits can be collected to refill the player's health bar, while bottles can be collected to expand the health bar. At the end of each area is a boss enemy, such as Brachiosaurus, Pteranodon, Triceratops, and Velociraptor. The final boss enemy is a Tyrannosaurus rex. The Master System version has identical gameplay. In both versions, Jurassic Park is opened to the public upon completion of the game.

== Reception ==
Game Gear reviews

Review scores
| Publication | Score |
|---|---|
| Computer and Video Games | 75/100 |
| Electronic Gaming Monthly | 7-8 out of 10 |
| Joypad | 64/100 |
| Mega Fun | 70% (Game Gear / Master System) |
| Player One | 72% |
| Video Games (DE) | 58/100 |
| Mean Machines | 35/100 |
| Mega Force | 90% |
| Sega Power | 25% 54% (Master System) |

Jurassic Park received praise for its graphics, but was criticized for its short length and easy gameplay.

Sega Visions wrote: "Even without the hot Jurassic Park license, this portable action game would stand on its own with solid graphics and game play". Richard Longhurst of Sega Power called it "the most shameful film licence game ever to disgrace the Gear". Rob Pegley, also writing for Sega Power, reviewed the Master System version and found the gameplay to be unoriginal. The game was generally praised by four critics writing for Electronic Gaming Monthly, although two were unimpressed with the driving portions of the game. Mean Machines opined that the game had a lack of levels and variety.

The game's music received praise and criticism. "Scary Larry" of GamePro stated that the sound effects "are stale, but effective", writing that the game "tries to emulate the roar of the beasts and the sounds of the jungle, but the dinosaurs end up sounding sickly". Paul Rand of Computer and Video Games praised the sampled dinosaur roars. Mean Machines found them to be "awful", and also criticized the "instantly forgettable music".
