= Jurassic Park (NES video game) =

1993 video game

- North American NES box art
- Developer: Ocean Software
- Publisher: Ocean Software
- Composer: Jon Dunn
- Series: Jurassic Park
- Platforms: NES, Game Boy
- Release: NES: NA: June 1993; UK: November 1993; Game Boy: NA: August 1993; UK: October 1993
- Genre: Action
- Mode: Single-player

Jurassic Park is a 1993 action video game based on the film of the same name, itself based on Michael Crichton's 1990 novel. It was developed and published by Ocean Software and released for the Nintendo Entertainment System (NES). Ocean also ported the game onto the handheld Game Boy console.

The object of the game is to survive in Jurassic Park, a theme park and zoo where genetically engineered dinosaurs have escaped from containment.

== Plot ==
The game's first level.

Much like the film and novel which it is based on, Dr. Alan Grant is trapped at Jurassic Park located on Isla Nublar. The park's power has been cut out because of a computer malfunction, and the dinosaurs are roaming free. Grant must complete a series of missions that will eventually lead to him escaping the island without being killed by the dinosaurs. Grant must also rescue Lex and Tim, the grandchildren of the park's owner, John Hammond.

After locating Hammond's grandchildren, Grant must reactivate the park's computers and destroy Velociraptor nests using time bombs. Grant then reaches the park's dock and uses a radio to contact help. Grant then reaches a helipad and is rescued from the island.

The game's ending consists of the player walking around a small stage filled with the game developers' names and an exit where the player can end the game.

== Gameplay ==
The game is a top-down shooter. As Alan Grant, the player must complete six levels with objectives ranging from rescuing Hammond's grandchildren, destroying Velociraptor nests, turning the power back on and so forth. The game includes a two-player option in which players take turns.

Each level consists of a varying number of stages where the player must collect a certain amount of dinosaur eggs and access cards to advance further into the level. The player must battle a varying amount of dinosaur foes such as Velociraptor, Dilophosaurus, and Compsognathus. Tyrannosaurus rex is also encountered as an end boss in a couple of levels. Dinosaurs such as the T. rex cannot be killed by the player, only avoided. Common dinosaurs can be killed by using guns, which are scattered throughout each level.

There are also "mystery boxes" scattered throughout the game, which have ranging effects. Some will give the player additional health, temporary invincibility or an extra life. However, some will power down the player's energy or take away a life. The game gives the player three lives and four continues.

The Game Boy version is a port of the NES version, but includes the addition of a database, providing information on the game's dinosaurs.

== Development and release ==
Ocean Software, a British video game development company, paid an undisclosed six-figure sum to secure the rights to the Jurassic Park license to develop a game based on the film. To aid Ocean Software in creating the game, Universal Studios provided the programmers with various materials related to the film, including the script and photos of the sets. In the United States, Jurassic Park was released in June 1993.

Limited Run Games re-released the NES and Game Boy versions as part of Jurassic Park: Classic Games Collection, released in 2023 on Nintendo Switch, PlayStation 4, PlayStation 5, and Xbox Series X/S, coinciding with the film's 30th anniversary. The game is also available through re-issued Game Boy and NES cartridges.

== Reception ==
Reception

Review scores
Publication	Score
AllGame	4/5 (NES)
Aktueller Software Markt	10/12 (Game Boy)
Computer and Video Games	82/100 (NES); 89/100 (Game Boy)
Game Players	69% (NES); 65% (Game Boy)
Mega Fun	75% (Game Boy)
Player One	81% (Game Boy)
Video Games (DE)	65% (Game Boy)
Play Time	85/100 (Game Boy)

Jurassic Park received praise for its graphics, especially its dinosaurs. Paul Rand of Computer and Video Games called it "a sound game that's a little different from the usual platform stuff movie licences always seem to become".

Nintendo Power praised the game for its open world, its controls, and its recreation of certain situations from the film, but also wrote that it contained fewer elements of the film than expected. Reviewing the Game Boy version, Nintendo Power criticized the aiming as awkward, but otherwise praised the gameplay, feeling that it has a sense of danger from the film.

In a later review, Skyler Miller of AllGame wrote: "Jurassic Park is an uncharacteristically good movie adaptation [...]. As a late era NES game, the visuals are appropriately impressive, and pleasingly depict the various jungle environments and many types of dinosaurs you encounter". Nintendo Power rated Jurassic Park the fourth best NES game of 1993.

== See also ==
- List of Jurassic Park video games
