= Jurassic Park Interactive =

1994 video game

- Developer: Studio 3DO
- Publisher: Universal Interactive Studios
- Designer: Gregory A. Gorsiski
- Series: Jurassic Park
- Platform: 3DO
- Release: NA: May 10, 1994; PAL: 1994
- Genre: Action
- Mode: Single player

Jurassic Park Interactive is an action video game based on the 1993 movie Jurassic Park. It was released in North America on May 10, 1994 exclusively for 3DO by Universal Interactive Studios. Jurassic Park Interactive was the first video game released by Universal Interactive Studios.

== Gameplay ==
The game's interface is a computer screen that allows the player to navigate a map of the island, as well as a collection of five minigames programmed by Dennis Nedry. Players have to locate various guests on the map, then engage in a short first-person action level that either involves outrunning a Tyrannosaurus in a jeep, escaping from a small building containing raptors, or shooting approaching dilophosaurs with a charged electric gun. The end of the game comes once the player successfully relocates all of the island's guests to the helipad dock and locates outside help by breaking through the minigames.

Depending on the difficulty level chosen (Normal, Hard, or Expert), more guests are shown on the map to be saved, and less time is allowed in total to break through the minigames. In the minigames the player controls feather-light jeeps and microchips that blast floppy disks that read "DUMP".

== Development ==
Jurassic Park Interactive had originally been intended as the 3DO pack-in title for the console's October 1993 launch, but delays in development pushed the release date back. Approximately 10 people worked on the game during its 14-month development period, with a budget between $1–2 million. Designer Greg Gorsiski said about the game: "It's the hardest thing I've ever had to do. How do you rewrite a linear story for a non-linear environment and make it better? It's a task that a lot of game designers wouldn't touch with a 10-foot pole."

The game was not showcased at Chicago's Summer Consumer Electronics Show in June 1993, as the developers chose to keep it a "closely-guarded secret" until its release. Jurassic Park Interactive was the first game to be published by MCA's Universal Interactive division. Universal and MCA hoped the game would increase sales of its struggling 3DO Interactive Multiplayer game system. Universal Interactive spent a considerable amount of money to market the game.

Jurassic Park Interactive was the only video game adaptation of Jurassic Park to use footage and music from the film. Although footage from the film is included in the opening sequence, actual shots of actors' faces are noticeably edited out. Look-alike actors portray the characters in further game cutscenes and images. MCA had no plans to convert the game for release on other game systems, possibly to promote the 3DO, although Gorsiski also said it would be difficult to rewrite the game for other systems as it took advantage of the 3DO's superior technology.

== Reception ==
Reception

Review scores
Publication	Score
AllGame	3/5
Aktueller Software Markt	5/12
Consoles +	82%
Computer and Video Games	65/100
Electronic Gaming Monthly	8/10, 8/10, 7/10, 8/10
Famitsu	22/40
Game Informer	5/10
GamesMaster	45/100
Génération 4	30%
Joystick	70%
M! Games	28%
Electronic Games	B+
Entertainment Weekly	D
VideoGames	7/10

Jurassic Park Interactive received a mixed reception from critics. Entertainment Weekly's Bob Strauss called it "one giant slab of prehistoric cheese." Strauss wrote, "I can say with confidence that the vehicular sequences in Jurassic Park Interactive, with their clumsy controls and grainy visuals, are among the most inept I've seen. [...] The other sequences, sad to say, are also somewhat stingy, lizard-wise-and equally uninteresting to play". Electronic Gaming Monthly praised the full motion video sequences, the use of music from the film, the innovation of the main levels, and the nostalgia value of the Nedry minigames. GamePro's Atomic Dawg asserted that the music is the game's only good point, lambasting the long load times, substandard graphics, simplistic and boring gameplay, and unvarying video sequences.

VideoGames' Chris Gore wrote that the game's biggest weakness was its variety of different gameplay genres, stating that once a player becomes truly involved in a certain game genre, "the experience is yanked away; you're literally forced to play a game of a different genre every few minutes". Wired's Zach Meston wrote that "the most exciting flick of 1993" had been turned into "a bunch of extremely dull arcade sequences linked together by silly full-motion video clips of people running through jungle scenery". AllGame's Shawn Sackenheim praised the "decent 2D animations" of the minigames, but wrote "they're nothing you'd expect to see on a 32-bit system like the 3DO". Sackenheim found the minigames enjoyable but with little replay value, calling them "rehashes" of classic arcade games.

In 2018, Kotaku ranked it among the "worst" Jurassic Park games ever released, calling it "boring and unintentionally hilarious", while criticizing the "poorly designed" minigames and the "laughably bad imitations" of the film's characters.

== See also ==
- Jurassic Park video games
