= The Lost World: Jurassic Park (video game) =

The 1997 film The Lost World: Jurassic Park received a number of video game adaptations. These include:

- The Lost World: Jurassic Park (arcade game), a light-gun arcade game
- The Lost World: Jurassic Park (Genesis video game), a top-down action game for the Sega Genesis
- The Lost World: Jurassic Park (console game), a side-scrolling action game for the PlayStation and Sega Saturn
- The Lost World: Jurassic Park (handheld game), a platformer released on various handheld systems
- Chaos Island: The Lost World, a strategy game for PCs

== Related ==
- The Lost World: Jurassic Park (pinball), a 1997 pinball game based on the film
- Trespasser, first-person shooter for the PC released in 1998, intended to serve as a sequel to the feature film The Lost World: Jurassic Park
