= Jurassic Park (computer video game) =

1993 video game

- Amiga cover art
- Developer: Ocean Software
- Publisher: Ocean Software
- Producer: Jon Woods
- Designers: Matthew Wood; Warren Lancashire
- Composer: Dean Evans
- Series: Jurassic Park
- Platforms: Amiga 500; Amiga 600; Amiga 1200; DOS
- Release: Amiga 1200, DOS: UK: October 1993; NA: 1994; Amiga 500/600: UK/NA: 1994
- Genre: Action
- Mode: Single-player

Jurassic Park is a 1993 action video game developed and published by Ocean Software for Amiga and DOS computers. The game is based on the 1993 film of the same name, and also includes elements from Michael Crichton's 1990 novel of the same name, which the film is based upon.

The player controls Dr. Alan Grant, a paleontologist who becomes trapped at Jurassic Park, an island theme park and zoo populated by genetically engineered dinosaurs. Grant's initial objective is to search for Lex and Tim, the grandchildren of park owner John Hammond. Upon locating the children, Grant must contact a helicopter so survivors can escape the island. Gameplay consists of a bird's-eye view during the game's large exterior environment, but switches to a first-person perspective whenever Grant enters a building.

Development of the game began in November 1992. A development team of 13 people – considered large at that time – worked on the game. Director Steven Spielberg was also involved in the game during its development to ensure that it would be faithful to his initial vision. Materials related to the film, including its script and photographs of the sets, aided the developers during the game's production. Jurassic Park was released in the United Kingdom in October 1993, and was subsequently released in the United States a year later. Many critics praised the game's indoor environments, but some criticized its large exterior environment, and its boring and repetitive gameplay.

== Gameplay ==
Jurassic Park is based on the 1993 film of the same name, in which paleontologist Dr. Alan Grant and others become trapped on an island theme park and zoo where genetically engineered dinosaurs have escaped. Playing as Grant, the player must rescue Lex and Tim, the grandchildren of the park's owner, John Hammond. The player begins the game near an overturned vehicle in the Tyrannosaurus paddock. After finding Tim, Grant searches for Lex in a sewer maze. The player then must re-activate the park's power to contact a helicopter so the survivors can escape the island.

Jurassic Park features a bird's-eye view in exterior levels, but switches to a first-person shooter perspective when entering buildings. The exterior levels contain eight large areas, each one consisting of a different dinosaur paddock, as well as a Pteranodon dome. Each level requires Grant to complete a series of tasks in order to advance further through the game. Indoor levels are spread throughout the game. The game features 11 building complexes, each one overrun by velociraptors. The game also includes a raft level. A password is given after each level is won.

The game includes six dinosaur enemies, as well as giant dragonflies. The player begins with a taser weapon; other weapons can be found by the player. First aid kits can be used to restore all of the player's health. Electronic motion sensors are located throughout the game, and can detect all moving objects. Connected to the motion sensors are computer terminals, which can be used to receive messages, maps of the park, and to open doors and gates. Some gates require a keycard. The computers also inform the player of the next mission objective. Items such as keys are used automatically when they are needed. Additionally, the player's gun reloads itself with ammunition when needed. In parts of the game are utility sheds, some of which contain objects that can help the player, including night vision goggles. Objects such as rocks can be moved around to overcome obstacles.

== Development and release ==
Ocean Software, a British video game development company, paid an undisclosed six-figure sum to secure the rights to the Jurassic Park license to develop a game based on the film. Storyboarding for the game was underway in August 1992, with scenes being created based on the film's script. Development commenced in November. The development team originally worked on an Amiga 500 version, as software development kits for the Amiga 1200 were unavailable at the time. An Amiga 1200 development kit eventually became available, resulting in all development being transferred; thus, the release of the Amiga 500 and Amiga 600 versions was expected to be delayed.

Because of Jurassic Park's two separate gameplay modes, a development team of 13 people – considered large at that time – worked on the game. Gary Bracey, software director for Ocean Software, said that the film's director Steven Spielberg "is a games fanatic himself and has a hands-on involvement to ensure that the final result is as faithful as possible to his original idea. He would not allow any Mario-type figure to start jumping all over the dinosaurs!" Ocean's American programmers, who were working on Nintendo versions of the game, sent over material from Universal Studios to aid the computer version's development team. This material included the film's script, photographs of the set and dinosaurs, and an audiotape of the film's sound effects, which was used to sample the game's Tyrannosaurus rex and smaller dinosaurs.

Regarding Jurassic Park's gameplay, co-designer and graphic artist Matt Wood said: "We really wanted to do something a bit different, something that ties in with the movie a bit more. We actually went through about three or four game designs before we had one that we were really happy with. Initially it was looking like just another Ocean licence - you know, the sort that everybody hates with a sub-game here and a little puzzle there. But we thought 'No, no, this won't do at all'. And so we've ended up with something very different".

At Universal's request, the development team was restricted from implementing large weapons into the game; Wood stated: "We were told not to do just a shooting game. It's like Cadaver in a lot of ways". Wood explained that the game is "more about stealth and creeping around corners, wondering whether you're going to get eaten by something big and horrible. There are a few puzzles, like how to get through the door into the next area, but in the game as a whole we've tried to keep everything moving along. There's no messing around trying to find which key you need to open the door and that sort of thing. You'll just walk into the door and if you've got the key then you'll go through. There's no point wasting the player's time making them hunt through their inventory".

The game's overhead angles caused problems for the game's artists; Bill Harbison said, "I don't know how many times I had to redraw the sprites. I had to come up with eight separate frames of animation for each of the different directions". The development team spent hundreds of hours consulting references and researching ostrich running movements to determine how to make the dinosaurs' movements smooth.

By July 1993, the game's exterior levels were nearly complete. The game's Pteranodon aviary was an idea featured in Michael Crichton's 1990 Jurassic Park novel but not in the film adaptation. Other locations exclusively from the novel were used for the game as well. Procompsognathus, a dinosaur featured in the novel, was also included in the game. Project manager Colin Gordon said the game would closely follow the film's plot. In addition, Gordon said about Lex and Tim: "We've tried to retain their characters - for instance, we've got Lex doing stupid and dangerous things like she does in the movie".

In the U.K., Jurassic Park was released for DOS and Amiga 1200 in October 1993. By April 1994, versions for the Amiga 500 and Amiga 600 had been released in the U.K. The game was released in North America later that year, for DOS and Amiga.

== Reception ==
=== Amiga version ===
Amiga reviews

Review scores
Publication	Score
Amiga Action	88%
Amiga Computing	72%
Amiga Format	70% 75% (1995)
Amiga Power	71%
Amiga World	B+
CU Amiga	87% 58% (1995)
The One Amiga	89% 83% (1995)

The Amiga version of Jurassic Park received generally positive reviews, with many critics praising the game's indoor sections in particular, but some criticizing the game's large environments, and its boring and repetitive gameplay. Some reviewers noted that with improved gameplay, Jurassic Park could have become a classic video game. The game's graphics and sound were generally praised, with Steve McGill of Amiga Power calling them "the computer game equivalent of heroic Greek sculptures". Steve Bradley of Amiga Format believed the graphics to be the game's "strongest point", although he considered the sound effects to be average. Some reviewers criticized the game for its lack of hard drive installation, with Rob Hayes of Amazing Computing writing: "The biggest problem is that Jurassic Park uses disk-based copy protection, meaning no hard drive installation. Long load times between sections, and switching four disks around should not be necessary in 1994".

Bradley wrote that maneuvering Grant's character was difficult, particularly while trying to shoot dinosaurs because "you've got to be directly in line with them". Bradley also felt that the game lacked action and variety, and criticized the game's first-person mode: "This basically consists of wandering through a maze of passages clutching a gun and blowing away the dinos as and when they appear. This, however, is not quite as exciting as it sounds and you can spend an age just trying to get out of there, even with the aid of a map. Inevitably, in such a huge park, there are times when you get completely stuck". Bradley concluded that the game consisted of too much wandering "to make this the classic it could have been". Bradley subsequently reviewed the Amiga 500 and Amiga 600 versions and noted that their graphics were not as impressive, while also writing: "Sure, there's a huge gaming area and it does have some fetching and atmospheric 3D point-of-view perspective levels but, on the whole, it's a disappointment. Too much wandering around and not enough action".

Although McGill stated that Jurassic Park was probably "the most beautiful game you will ever see on the Amiga" and called it a "vibrant exciting work of art", he considered most of the gameplay to be "utter crap", describing the game as "basically a big maze that you've got to explore", with the "real disappointment" being the linear puzzles. McGill praised the game's "genuinely scarey" indoor environments, writing that it is "the part of the game which could be considered the saving grace of the package. It's not that it plays all that differently. It's still a walk-around-collecting-things-and-switching-things-off-and-on kind of a romp. But oh, the atmosphere. [...] For the first time ever in my life I was afraid. I was very afraid". McGill concluded that the first-person sections "stop it from being an utter flop".

Peter Olafson of Amiga World praised its graphics, and its first-person perspective in particular: "These climatic sequences are worth the long slogs through the game's outdoor portions. Let's just say I was biting one hand and holding onto my chair with the other". However, Olafson wrote that playing through the game was "not always exciting enough, or even busy enough, to make you feel any sort of harrowing stake in the outcome. If they'd just given us a bit more to do–there's a lot of ill-used space, and many of the existing puzzles are treasure hunts–we might have had a classic on our hands". CU Amiga called the game "original, good to look at, excellent to play and varied throughout". CU Amiga wrote that the game's overhead perspective "plays a lot better than it looks", and complimented the dinosaur animations. CU Amiga particularly praised the game's first-person mode for "some amazing 3D graphics" but also wrote that the "smoothly-scrolling backgrounds aren't as detailed as they could have been considering they are on the 1200, but the dinosaur graphics more than compensate. The scaling as they come towards you is pixel-perfect with no nasty blockiness to spoil the atmosphere".

John Archer of Amiga Action praised the smooth movements of the interior sections, and wrote: "Seeing a 'raptor tail dart fleetingly through the shadows ahead of you really sets the nerves on edge as you inch forward, gun poised, eyes sweeping left and right, trying to predict where the inevitable attack will come from next". However, Archer stated that the game was occasionally repetitive despite the "extremely impressive and intense" first-person areas; he believed that the inclusion of more puzzles or discoverable objects could have improved the gameplay. Archer criticized the game's large levels as well, stating that they felt "just a little too big for their own good". Archer also wrote that the background graphics "tend to be rather bland - and a bit more variation in the way different levels look wouldn't have gone amiss either. Most of the effort seems to have gone into producing the actual dinosaur graphics. These are sometimes frighteningly excellent".

Archer noted that some parts of the game pushed the Amiga "both sonically and graphically to its limits", and opined that anyone who purchased the game would not be "able to say they were ripped off, as it has to be one of the largest games ever. There are really two games rolled into one, either of which would be able to hold its head up high if it released by itself". Archer concluded that while the gameplay "is not quite intensive or compulsive enough", Jurassic Park "sure as hell makes a fine change from the turgid and unimaginative stuff we are used to getting from big licenses. Even Spielberg has said he likes it, and that's a man who knows a success when he sees one!"

Jonathan Maddock of Amiga Computing praised the interior levels for their "brilliant" soundtrack and "dark and moody" graphics, writing "it really generates a spooky feeling within you". Maddock concluded that although Jurassic Park "looks like one of the best film licence tie-ins" ever released for computers, the game "unfortunately is let down by some really bad playability. This makes the game boring in parts and gamers are easily going to lose interest with it which is a crying shame because, it could've been a classic". Matt Broughton of The One Amiga wrote that Ocean's reputation for film-licensed video games was further enhanced with the release of Jurassic Park. Broughton wrote that while the game followed the plot of the film "reasonably closely", the differences allowed for gameplay improvements. Broughton however noted that the game was "not perfect", writing that in the game's interior sections, "you can often spend long minutes wandering about with nothing to fight, and aiming at the smaller creatures in the top-viewed stages can be tricky".

==== Later reviews ====
Broughton reviewed the Amiga version again in 1995 and wrote: "When Ocean snapped up the rights to the world's biggest and most expensive movie, cynics expected a straightforward platform licence with an obligatory 'driving bit'. Though at the time this assumption may not have been totally unfounded, it could not have been further from the truth. [...] Had the game been top-down only, then things would soon become tedious". Broughton called the game's interior levels "without a doubt the most exciting of all. Although the window in which the action takes place is small by today's standards, the graphics here are atmospheric and fast". Bradley also reviewed the game again in 1995, criticizing its large exterior levels and praising its "frightening" interior levels, but ultimately concluding: "This cannot save Jurassic Park from the could-'ve-been-a-lot-better bin". CU Amiga praised the graphics but criticized the gameplay.

=== DOS version ===
Robin Matthews of Computer Gaming World in February 1994 favorably reviewed the DOS version of Jurassic Park, approving of the "very high quality graphics". He concluded that "Ocean has done an excellent job ... this is a respectable film tie-in". The magazine's Neil Harris gave it a negative review in June, writing that the game's dinosaurs "aren't particularly scary", and that the game "can't decide whether it's an action game or a puzzle game". He concluded that it was "amazing" that Spielberg's company, Amblin Entertainment, "allowed this game to get out the door". Paul Rand of Computer and Video Games found the first-person stages to be superior in the DOS version. Power Play rated the DOS version 76 percent.
