= Scan Command: Jurassic Park =

2001 video game

- Developer: Knowledge Adventure
- Publisher: Knowledge Adventure
- Series: Jurassic Park
- Platform: Microsoft Windows
- Release: October 11, 2001
- Genres: Fighting, strategy
- Modes: Single-player, multiplayer

Scan Command: Jurassic Park (also known as Jurassic Park: Scan Command) is a 2001 fighting strategy video game developed and published by Knowledge Adventure for Microsoft Windows. The game is based on the 2001 film, Jurassic Park III, and was considered unique for its use of a barcode scanner accessory known as the Scan Command.

== Gameplay ==
Scan Command: Jurassic Park involves an evil scientist, Dr. Irene Corts, who has taken over the Jurassic Park theme park with her army of genetically altered dinosaurs and plans to use them to achieve world domination. The player's goal is to stop Corts. The player must also locate five children and help them escape Jurassic Park. The game features eight playable creatures from the first three Jurassic Park films. The player starts out as a Velociraptor, while other dinosaurs such as Spinosaurus, Triceratops, and Tyrannosaurus rex become unlocked as more levels are completed. The game features seven levels, including caves, jungles, swamps, dilapidated InGen laboratories, and steel pyramids. The final level is set inside an active volcano.

The game included a portable, battery-powered barcode scanner, known as the Scan Command, capable of storing up to 25 scans at a time. Barcodes are scanned by the player to obtain "genetic codes". Barcodes are loaded into the game by connecting the scanner to a computer's serial port. When a barcode is loaded, it is transformed into dinosaur DNA as part of a puzzle minigame. Once completed, the "genetic codes" can then be used to enhance the player's defenses and attacks, with customizable traits such as agility and strength. Players can also trade "genetic codes". After reaching a certain power level, the player's creature can fight in real-time battles against other creatures controlled by evil scientists at InGen. In addition to solving puzzles, the player must also defeat enemy dinosaurs to advance to each new level.

== Development and release ==
In March 2001, Knowledge Adventure, a subsidiary of Vivendi Universal Publishing, obtained the rights to develop video games based on Universal Studios' upcoming film, Jurassic Park III. The concept of Scan Command and its barcode-scanning aspect were considered unusual when the game was unveiled at the Electronic Entertainment Expo (E3) in May 2001. Richard Wyckoff, one of the game's designers, said: "We figure that unless you live in a cave you're going to be surrounded by bar codes. That's why we chose them. They're so ubiquitous in our society". The game was unveiled with the initial title of Scan Command: A Jurassic Park III Game, and was released as Scan Command: Jurassic Park on October 11, 2001.

== Reception ==
Jason MacIsaac of The Electric Playground gave the game a 79 percent rating out of 100 and praised the scanner accessory: "It's a unique idea, and as a source of entertainment, nearly limitless. [...] And I'm surprised at how well this idea works into the gameplay". However, MacIsaac negatively wrote, "game screens can look like they've locked up when moving data". Jon Thompson of AllGame rated the game four stars out of five and wrote "scanning little black and white bar codes turns out to be more fun than you'd expect". Thompson praised the game's graphics, and its use of music and "detailed dinosaur sound effects" from the films, but the game's animation "could have been a bit crisper".

Michelle Megna of the New York Daily News wrote that the game relies "on the premise that children 8 and older will enjoy having something to do when they are dragged to the grocery or department store for the afternoon with their parents". Megna concluded that "the game is a bit complex, and it takes time to figure out how to put together your dinosaurs. After that, players will have a great time commanding prehistoric creatures in battles that take place in 3-D environments. Children looking for fast-paced, arcade action won't enjoy Scan Command, but those who like to tinker and solve puzzles should find the game engaging".

Carol Mangis of PC Magazine called the game and its barcode element "really fun". Computer Shopper recommended the game for shoppers of the 2001 Christmas season. In 2002, Scan Command: Jurassic Park was nominated by the Academy of Interactive Arts & Sciences for the PC Family award, but lost to Backyard Basketball.
