= Jurassic Park Builder =

2012 video game

- Developer: Ludia
- Publisher: Ludia
- Series: Jurassic Park
- Platforms: Android; Facebook iOS
- Release: Facebook: WW: July 23, 2012; iOS: NA: July 23, 2012; UK: October 19, 2012
- Genre: Construction and management simulation
- Mode: Single-player

Jurassic Park Builder was a 2012 construction and management simulation video game developed and published by Ludia for iOS and Android operating systems, as well as Facebook. The game, based on the Jurassic Park series, allows the player to build a theme park featuring extinct animals. Ludia ended the game's support as of March 30, 2020, making it unplayable.

In 2015, Ludia released a sequel to the game titled Jurassic World: The Game, to coincide with the release of the film Jurassic World.

== Gameplay ==
Jurassic Park Builder is a freemium game consisting of two-dimensional landscape renderings and three-dimensional creatures. The player's objective is to build and maintain a Jurassic Park theme park. The player begins the game with a basic home base, while expansion of the park is done by clearing land. To create dinosaurs, the player must clear away trees and rocks to locate prehistoric mosquitos, which are trapped in amber and contain dinosaur DNA. In a laboratory, the player then attempts to unlock the DNA from the mosquito. If the player is successful, then a dinosaur egg is created. Amber is sometimes discovered when the player clears land for park expansion.

Basic mission objectives are given to the player by characters from the first two films: Alan Grant, John Hammond, Ian Malcolm, and Kelly Curtis. Dr. Henry Wu, a park scientist, also appears in the game, which features no characters from the film Jurassic Park III. Mission objectives include constructing roads and feeding creatures in the park. Completing missions ultimately gives the player the ability to create new buildings and conduct research for cloning new dinosaurs. Buildings include hotels and theme park attractions, including tour vehicles that travel along a path determined by the player.

Revenue is earned through the buildings and dinosaurs that are located in the park. Revenue is collected in regular intervals, and the player can earn more money by feeding the dinosaurs to level them up. Although the dinosaurs do not require food to survive, feeding the animals will level them up, resulting in higher profits for the player. Carnivorous and herbivorous creatures require their own supply of food, which must be managed by the player to avoid running out. The player can choose to pay real money to purchase in-game currency, as well as supplies such as dinosaur food. Various aspects of the game take time to progress, including the hatching of dinosaur eggs, the clearing of forest land, and shipments of food from the mainland. The player can pay real currency to speed up these parts of the game.

In a minigame titled "Red Zone", the player must tap on a specific dinosaur to prevent it from escaping its enclosure. In addition to breakouts, the player is occasionally given the option to respond to other emergencies such as storms. Responding to emergencies earns the player additional in-game currency.

Aside from Jurassic Park on Isla Nublar, the game features two additional parks that the player can create: Aquatic Park, located on Nublar's seabed, featuring extinct aquatic animals; and Glacier Park, located in Patagonia, featuring extinct animals from the Cenozoic era along with some Mesozoic crocodilians.

== Development and release ==
In October 2011, Ludia announced a partnership with Universal Pictures to produce a park-building video game titled Jurassic Park: The Social Game. The game was to be released for Facebook and for mobile devices via the App Store, with a scheduled release in early 2012. The game was ultimately released as Jurassic Park Builder.

In North America, the game was released for the iOS operating system on July 23, 2012, accompanied by a simultaneous release on Facebook. A version was also released for the Android operating system. In the United Kingdom, the game was released through the App Store on October 19, 2012. The game was updated two months later to include aquatic creatures and to fix software bugs.

Ludia ended the game's support as of March 30, 2020, making it unplayable.

== Reception ==
The iOS version had strong sales in the first week of its release. Jurassic Park Builder was among the top 15 downloaded Android and iOS games of 2013. It was also among the top 10 highest grossing Android and iOS games of 2013.

Ben Hanson of Game Informer gave the game three and a half stars out of five. Hanson considered the sound effects to be the "weakest part" of the game, and wrote that the game "doesn't do anything exceptional for the genre, but if you have an ounce of love for Jurassic Park you might as well give it a shot". Mike Wehner of Engadget noted the in-game cost for some items and wrote: "Jurassic Park Builder will certainly satisfy fans of similar games like Farmville or even Sim City, but before you dive into the prehistoric landscape make sure you get your credit card ready. Chances are you're going to need it before long". Eli Hodapp of TouchArcade wrote: "If you're hoping for a mixture of a Tycoon-style game with Jurassic Park decals and racing stripes, you're going to be sorely disappointed. What we've got here is your average run of the mill free to play building game. Timers are everywhere, we hit our first pay wall about nine minutes in, and come across an array of other time (and money) sinks". Dave Gilmore of The Baltimore Sun praised the game and rated it 4 out of 4.

Website Slide to Play wrote: "As much as we dislike this unchallenging gameplay design, we still can't help but enjoy the pleasant visuals and audio". The review concluded: "Jurassic Park Builder isn't deep or challenging at all, unless you consider self-control to be a challenge. If you can keep yourself from spending a lot of extra money for in-game extras, Jurassic Park Builder is harmless fun".

Rob Rich of 148Apps.com gave the game four stars out of five and wrote: "Jurassic Park Builder is not Operation Genesis for mobile devices, but it is like playing a simplified freemium version of it. Which is all kinds of alright". Rich praised the game's graphics: "Backgrounds are lush and colorful, while the dinos themselves are actually three-dimensional and animated quite well. They even look good when zoomed in as close as possible, which is something not many free-to-play sims can claim". However, Rich criticized the game's "cheesy 'cameos'" and "horrific lag each time the game first starts up as it contacts Game Center. Waiting several seconds – possibly even a minute – until it's all good to go sees everything running nice and smooth, but that initial period of chugging can be excruciating".

Nadia Oxford of Gamezebo also rated the game four stars out of five and said that the "core gameplay certainly doesn't break new ground, but it builds a solid experience with its old materials". Oxford praised the game's "decent selection" of dinosaurs, and noted that "they vocalize with an impressive library of snarls, squeals, and grunts". Oxford also said "the game's selection of decorations and buildings is kind of sparse". She concluded that the game "doesn't really offer an outset that's as exciting as the movie that spawned it, but it's still a very decent park-building game that lets you manage some fascinating attractions".

== Jurassic World: The Game ==
A sequel to the game, titled Jurassic World: The Game and based on the 2015 film, Jurassic World, was released by Ludia for iOS on April 29, 2015. The game was announced by Universal Pictures in October 2014, as part of its promotional plans for the film.

Jurassic World: The Game is set on the fictional Costa Rican island of Isla Nublar, where the player is put in control of constructing a Jurassic World theme park. The player can add buildings and create dinosaurs to populate the park. The game also consists of a battle mode, in which the player's dinosaurs battle against rival dinosaurs in turn-based fights. The game features more than 50 dinosaurs, and main characters from the film, including Owen and Claire.

Patrick Klepek of Kotaku criticized the game for its use of in-game advertisements. Nadia Oxford of Gamezebo gave the game three stars out of five and considered it to be "pretty much Jurassic Park Builder part II", while stating that it "combines mediocre park-building with mediocre dino-battling. It's competent and by gosh it (mostly) looks glorious, but there isn't a lot here that differentiates the game from standard park-builders".
