= The Lost World: Jurassic Park (console game) =

1997 video game

- Developers: DreamWorks Interactive (PS); Appaloosa Interactive (SAT)
- Publishers: Electronic Arts (PS); Sega (SAT)
- Programmer: Matt Brown
- Composer: Michael Giacchino
- Series: Jurassic Park
- Platforms: PlayStation, Sega Saturn
- Release: PlayStation: NA: August 26, 1997; EU: September 5, 1997; Saturn: NA: September 23, 1997; EU: November 6, 1997
- Genre: Action-adventure
- Mode: Single-player

The Lost World: Jurassic Park is a 1997 action-adventure video game developed by DreamWorks Interactive and Appaloosa Interactive, and published by Electronic Arts and Sega for the PlayStation and Sega Saturn, respectively. The game is based on the film of the same name, which in turn is based on the 1995 novel by Michael Crichton. In 1998, a special edition of the game was released for the PlayStation as a Greatest Hits title, with several modifications to the gameplay.

== Gameplay ==
The Saturn and PlayStation versions feature identical gameplay. The game features a side-scroller perspective. There are 5 characters in all throughout the course of the game, each with their own special abilities and attributes: Compsognathus, Human Hunter, Velociraptor, Tyrannosaurus rex, and Sarah Harding, who is also known as the "Human Prey". During gameplay, the character must complete all levels sequentially to gain access to the next character. For each character, there are "DNA bonuses" in each level that can be collected for access to storyboard art for that particular character. Actor Jeff Goldblum briefly reprised his role as Ian Malcolm for a secret ending that the player can access if every DNA bonus is collected. The secret ending is a video of Goldblum congratulating the player for finishing the game, but suggesting to go outside and do other activities instead.

The Lost World: Jurassic Park ignores the plot of the film, despite featuring some of its dinosaurs and being set on "Site B", an island also known as Isla Sorna and used as InGen's dinosaur breeding site. The plot varies with every character, each one struggling to survive on the island, populated by over 20 species of dinosaurs in an environment of escalating chaos. Item pickups for the dinosaur characters are limited to food needed to maintain their strength, while item pickups for the human characters include gas canisters, automatic weapons, health refills, and rocket launchers.

The playable dinosaurs' chapters consist of traversing various parts of the island, defending against other predators as well as InGen hunters. The "Human Hunter" chapters are largely based in more urban environments, including an underground complex, a geothermal center and an InGen lab. Although objectives are never elaborated on, the Hunter's goal is to eliminate any dinosaur threat. The final chapters involve Harding escaping the island on a cargo ship.

== Development ==
DreamWorks Interactive announced that they were working on a video game based on The Lost World: Jurassic Park in the third quarter of 1996. In March 1997, Electronic Arts announced that it had secured the distribution and publishing rights for a PlayStation video game adaptation of the film, as part of a deal with DreamWorks. During the first two months of pre-production, producer Patrick Gilmore held daily meetings with his development team to develop a variety of ideas for the game. The ideas were ultimately put into a concept document that included more than 100 pages, some of which offered storyboards and detailed descriptions of each scene in the game. Gilmore said, "The Lost World could have been just another game where you kill dinosaurs, but instead we created an ambiance that enables you to feel what the hunter and the hunted are going through. Too many games hand you a gun and say 'Go shoot' without giving you a feel for what's happening on the other side of the barrel."

Concept artist Matt Hall created each of the game's creatures using skeletal references. He said, "I wanted to make sure everything could be backed up by the latest scientific theories regarding posture and musculature. When selecting color, I had much more freedom, but an effort was made to study natural color patterns of animals which exist today." The creatures' designs were based on computer-generated models created for the film by Industrial Light & Magic. Creature designs were also based on photographs of dinosaur maquettes that were created by artist Stan Winston for the film. 3D creatures were then created as low polygon models combined with Hall's sketches.

The movements of the game's T. rex, raptor, and Brachiosaurus were based on movements featured in the original film, Jurassic Park. The game's animation team visited the Los Angeles Zoo multiple times and watched nature programs to study the movement of modern animals as research for how to animate other creatures that did not appear in the films. Animator Sunil Thankamuchy recounted using the physics learned from running to catch the bus with a backpack on to animate the game's Deinonychus, who are known to use their incredibly stiff tail as a rudder when running. Mesh modifiers were applied to create the animations, rather than manipulating the polygonal geometry directly, and a custom development tool was used to convert the animation files into a PlayStation-readable format.

Not wanting to divide their resources, DreamWorks opted out of developing the Saturn version, and Sega contracted the job to Appaloosa Interactive. Because the Saturn version was a port, and all major progress on it had to be approved by DreamWorks, it inevitably lagged behind the PlayStation version in development progress. By May 1997, the Sega Saturn version was 40-percent complete, while the PlayStation version was 60-percent complete and approximately three weeks ahead in development.

The game was created with DreamWorks Interactive's Morf-X game engine. Though the engine supports true 3D worlds, the team decided to use 2D gameplay since it involves simpler controls and camera work, allowing for more intense action and greater ease in setting up cinematic shots. The development team had access to pre-production materials from the film, as well as models and sets. Spielberg regularly checked on the progress of the game, and also offered creative input. Spielberg was particularly helpful in providing technical information about dinosaurs to the developers.

Bryan Franklin and Erik Kraber of Franklin Media worked on the game's sound effects; they had previously created sound effects for Jurassic Park: The Online Adventure and Jurassic Park: The Ride. The creature sound effects were created using thousands of animal noises, such as beluga whale songs, vermilion flycatcher clicks, and the grunts of baby jaguars, as well as humans blowing through a 12-foot vacuum tube. A total of 1,400 sounds were created for the game's 23 creatures and two human characters, as well as other elements of the game. Sound effects were altered in multiple ways to create the creatures' various noises.

=== Soundtrack ===
The music was composed by Michael Giacchino who was hired by DreamWorks Interactive to create a piece of music for an animated demo the producers were going to show to the game's producer, Steven Spielberg. Spielberg was impressed by the demo and the music. After the meeting, Giacchino was called down to the meeting room to meet Spielberg, who, after meeting him, called Giacchino "a young John Williams." It was agreed that the score would be recorded with a live orchestra.

Giacchino was given a book of the game's storyboards to aid in the musical composition. Giacchino worked on the score for six months while the game was in development. The music was created during a two-day recording session with a 40-piece orchestra, and was subsequently mixed at a post-production house in Hollywood, California. The soundtrack was edited to include 19 tracks, with a total duration of 45 minutes. Giacchino gave each playable character a brief theme to reflect their personality and purpose. Giacchino went on to compose the score for Jurassic World and its sequels.

Reviewers expressed so much enthusiasm for playing a game with a live orchestral soundtrack that DreamWorks would get Giacchino to use an orchestra for his later scores for the Medal of Honor games. The soundtrack can be played by inserting the game disc into a CD player. The Lost World: Jurassic Park's soundtrack was released separately on CD by Sonic Images on February 24, 1998.

== Reception ==
Reception

Aggregate score
Aggregator	Score
GameRankings	60% (PS1)

Review scores
Publication	Score
Electronic Gaming Monthly	6.75/10 (PS1)
Game Informer	5.5/10 (PS1)
GameRevolution	C (PS1)
GameSpot	5.6/10 (PS1)
IGN	5/10 (PS1)
Next Generation	2/5 (PS1)
Official U.S. PlayStation Magazine	1/5 (PS1)
Entertainment Weekly	B− (PS1)
Sega Saturn Magazine	60% (SAT)

The Lost World: Jurassic Park was released to mixed reviews. While critics uniformly described the sound effects as enthralling, the orchestral soundtrack as atmospheric and effective, and the differing playable creatures as providing variety to the gameplay, most felt that the poor controls override these issues and ruin the experience of playing the game. IGN, for instance, commented that "all this great screaming and blood is lost after you realize you can't control the game for beans. Platform titles require tight control and lightning-fast response, and The Lost World has neither." Dan Hsu of Electronic Gaming Monthly summarized, "One of the vital ingredients in any decent platform-action game is control, an ingredient needlessly left out of The Lost World. ... It's unfortunate, since The Lost World has almost everything else going for it."

Reviewers also widely held the 2D platforming design to be limited and clichéd, as well as suffering from frustrating difficulty. Next Generation stated that "the level designs are best described as amateurish." GamePro was one of the few to conclude these issues do not ruin the game, arguing that "that's the challenge of the Lost World, where survival of the fittest is the rule and not the exception. If you get past your initial frustration with the game, you're rewarded with fun, realistic, and enjoyable gameplay that will keep you at your PlayStation for hours." The reviewer gave it a 4.0 out of 5 for control and a perfect 5.0 in every other category (graphics, sound, and funfactor). However, a different critic reviewed the Saturn version for GamePro, and concurred with the majority: "As you spend most of your time falling off ledges and dying (only to be returned to the beginning of the level), miscalculating jumps, and inadvertently putting yourself directly in the path of an oncoming dino, you'll realize why games like this became extinct long ago." Additionally, GameSpot commented regarding the T. rex as a playable character, "on the back of the game's box it says in really big letters: 'You're The T-Rex.' The whole truth is you only get to be the T-Rex for seven of the 30 levels."

Most critics praised the PlayStation version's cutting edge graphics and smooth, lifelike dinosaur animations. Game Revolution stated that "despite the game's many problems, every PlayStation owner should rent the game just to experience its graphics". However, Sega Saturn Magazine reported that the Saturn version lacks many of the impressive translucency effects and background rendering of the PlayStation version and has a choppier frame rate, resulting in a game which "wouldn't look out of place on a 16-bit machine".

The game sold an estimated 600,000 copies.

== Special Edition ==
On September 23, 1998, the game was released for the Sony PlayStation under the Greatest Hits banner as The Lost World: Jurassic Park - Special Edition. Unlike most Greatest Hits releases, this was not a straight repackaging of the original game. Instead, Special Edition features several modifications to the gameplay designed to address concerns raised by critics on the game's initial release. Several of the game's mechanics that were modified included the difficulty level with mid level checkpoints, stronger player characters, and the inclusion of level select codes in the manual.

Special Edition also features an additional level that allows players to play as the T. rex much earlier than before.

== See also ==
- Jurassic Park video games
- The Lost World: Jurassic Park (video game), a listing of games based on The Lost World: Jurassic Park
