= Jurassic Park III: Island Attack =

2001 video game

- North American box art
- Developer: Mobile21
- Publisher: Konami
- Series: Jurassic Park
- Platform: Game Boy Advance
- Release: JP: August 30, 2001; NA: November 26, 2001; UK: February 8, 2002; AU: March 1, 2002
- Genre: Action-adventure
- Mode: Single-player

Jurassic Park III: Island Attack (known as Jurassic Park III: Advanced Action in Japan and Jurassic Park III: Dino Attack in Europe; originally known as Jurassic Park III: Primal Fear) is a video game for the Game Boy Advance, and is loosely based on the 2001 film Jurassic Park III. It is the third and final game, under the title Jurassic Park III, for the Game Boy Advance title games after The DNA Factor and Park Builder, both released in the same year.

== Gameplay ==
After crash-landing on Isla Sorna, Dr. Alan Grant contacts the coast guard and is told to reach the island's coast to be rescued. Playing as Grant, the player's goal is to travel through eight areas of Isla Sorna to reach the coast.

There are two types of levels: freeroam, and forward only. Every level uses freeroam, with the exception of three. These three levels also use cross-section camera angles, while the rest of the levels use an overview camera.

Players can sprint by double tapping the GBA's D-Pad. Reviewers criticized the double-tap to sprint mechanic as unresponsive and awkward, particularly during the game's high-intensity chase scenes.

== Reception ==
On Metacritic, the game has a score of 57, indicating "Mixed or average reviews". Charlie Cummins of Gamezilla! rated the game 50 out of 100, and criticized its "poor" controls, its sound effects and music, its "difficult" viewpoint, and its graphics for being "very pixelated and difficult to discern". Cummins felt that the game's audio and graphics would be much better if the game had been released on a home video game console. Cummins offered praise for the game's motorcycle level, calling it "somewhat fun and enjoyable".

Jennifer Beam of AllGame rated the game two and a half stars out of five and wrote: "Dr. Grant's character, though easily controlled, can essentially do one of two things: tirelessly fire his stun gun upon the dinos who in turn inflict ten times the damage on his health meter, or run like heck. Running is usually the best option, if you could even call it an option. Yet, he won't be winning any marathons since he usually escapes by only a hair". Beam praised the game's "fairly realistic" dinosaurs, but criticized their dull color schemes. Beam also wrote: "Not much excitement is generated from the background music and sound effects are lacking".

William Cassidy of GameSpy rated the game 69 out of 100, and praised the graphics, music, and diverse gameplay styles and perspectives, but criticized the game for its difficulty and repetitive gameplay, and noted that some of its graphics were too dark, a factor which made gameplay more difficult. Cassidy wrote that "for all its faults, occasionally Island Attack will surprise you with an area that feels like a challenge and not a trial. These rare levels strike a better balance between puzzles and action. You may even be able to relax and enjoy the level instead of worrying that you'll die and have to do it all over again. Unfortunately, there's not enough of that to be found in this game".
