= Jurassic Park 2: The Chaos Continues =

1994 video game

- North American SNES box art
- Developer: Ocean Software
- Publisher: Ocean Software
- Composers: Dean Evans (Super NES); Jonathan Dunn (Game Boy)
- Series: Jurassic Park
- Platforms: Super NES, Game Boy
- Release: Super NES: NA/EU: Late 1994; Game Boy: NA: February 1995
- Genre: Run and gun
- Modes: Single-player, multiplayer (SNES)

Jurassic Park 2: The Chaos Continues (also known as Jurassic Park Part 2: The Chaos Continues) is a 1994 run and gun video game developed and published by Ocean Software for the Super Nintendo Entertainment System (SNES). It is a sequel to the Super NES game Jurassic Park, and a non-canonical continuation of the Jurassic Park series.

Jurassic Park 2: The Chaos Continues was released in November or December 1994. A Game Boy version with a different storyline was released in February 1995. In 2023, Limited Run Games re-released both versions as part of Jurassic Park: Classic Games Collection for Nintendo Switch, PlayStation 4, PlayStation 5, and Xbox Series X/S, commemorating the 30th anniversary of the film Jurassic Park. The games were also available through re-issued Game Boy and SNES cartridges.

== Gameplay ==
=== Super NES version ===
BioSyn's leaders plot their attack.

The Super NES version features a cinematic opening explaining that the main competitor of InGen, BioSyn, is sending in troops and scientists in an attempt to gain control of Isla Nublar for their own purposes.

The Super NES instruction booklet indicates that John Hammond, the head of InGen, planned to reopen Jurassic Park and had sent a heavily armed team to assess the island after the initial incident there. According to the booklet, Hammond's team was overrun by dinosaurs. The booklet states that following BioSyn's invasion, Hammond has personally asked Dr. Alan Grant to stop BioSyn, because of his familiarity with the island and its dinosaurs. Hammond has authorized a tactical sergeant named Michael Wolfskin to accompany Grant. Hammond requests that Grant not harm the expensive animals, except for the dangerous Tyrannosaurus rex and Velociraptors.

Blockade mission, with Grant alone.

Jurassic Park 2 is a side-scrolling run and gun game. The player controls Grant, while an optional second player controls Wolfskin. The player can select a level from a list and play through the game's stages in any order; however, "emergency" missions also appear after each level is completed, and the order of these stages does not change. Some stages offer a simple flat design, some have a platforming focus, and others feature a maze of doorways that must be navigated to locate the exit.

The player can choose among three lethal weapons (rifle, machine gun, shotgun), and three non-lethal weapons (electric stun gun, tranquilizer gun, and gas grenade launcher). The lethal rounds are effective against humans and dinosaurs, while the non-lethal rounds are designed to incapacitate dinosaurs without killing them, so as to preserve InGen's investment; if the number of dinosaurs killed with lethal weapons by the player becomes too high, the game will end. Non-lethal rounds do not affect humans while killing raptors with lethal rounds will not affect the number of dinosaurs killed.

=== Game Boy version ===
Biosyn is not featured in the Game Boy version. The player controls Grant, whose vehicle at Jurassic Park has stopped functioning as the result of an intentional power outage. Grant moves through a rain forest and later takes a raft down a river, where he encounters aquatic reptiles. Grant ultimately reaches Jurassic Park's headquarters, where most of the power remains off.

The Game Boy version is also a side-scroller, played across four zones on different parts of the island. The common quest requires the player to collect magnetic card keys to open security gates. Enemies include raptors and pterosaurs. The game also features several boss enemies, including a Triceratops.

Additionally, the game features stages in which Grant must flee a Tyrannosaurus rex. Obstacles such as fire and spikes must also be avoided. First-aid kits can be collected to replenish the player's health, while identification cards can be collected for bonus points.

== Reception ==
SNES reviews

Review scores
Publication	Score
Electronic Gaming Monthly	7/10
Game Players	77%
Jeuxvideo.com	14/20
Mega Fun	71%
Next Generation	2/5
Super Play	83%
VideoGames & Computer Entertainment	6/10
Superjuegos	84/100

The Super NES version received mixed views from critics. It was praised for its music and sound effects, but received some criticism for its difficulty. Nintendo Power praised it for including a two-player option, but found the gameplay to be unbalanced, stating that weapons "have little stopping power" and that some "basic enemies are virtually impossible to destroy while others are simple". The graphics were generally praised, including the introduction sequence, although some critics found the visuals to be drab.

The Super NES version's gameplay was criticized. Mike Salmon of Game Players felt that the game lacked the variety of its Super NES predecessor, Jurassic Park. Only one of Electronic Gaming Monthly's four reviewers were impressed with the game. The other three expressed disappointment that the series had turned from the adventure gameplay of the original game to a generic run-and-gun with repetitive missions. GamePro likewise dismissed the game as having over-familiar run-and-gun gameplay, concluding "you've seen this type of game play in a hundred other games; unfortunately, nothing new is added here to improve upon mediocrity." Next Generation wrote, "The action, no matter what the situation, ultimately waters down to the usual 'run-and-shoot' cash-cow." Super Play also commented on the lack of freshness to the gameplay. VideoGames called it, "Yet another tarnished jewel on the Jurassic Park franchise crown". The magazine criticized the game for "boring adventures" and "screens that begin to look a bit too familiar level after level. The graphics are pretty cool, but that doesn't save this game from being a sustained exercise in tedium." Australia's The Sydney Morning Herald praised the Super NES version and wrote that the game "is not unique, but its ideas are interesting."

Nintendo Power praised the Game Boy version for its controls and music, and wrote that "in some ways," it was better than its Super NES counterpart. However, the magazine criticized it for having no Super Game Boy features and for not being challenging enough. Jeuxvideo.com reviewed the Super NES version in 2011, praising the music while criticizing the difficulty. Chris Jackson of Starburst, reviewing both versions in the 2023 re-release collection, wrote that "the Super Nintendo version's take on Another World / Flashback-style gameplay pales in comparison to the Game Boy's more straightforward platforming."

== See also ==
- Jurassic Park video games
