= Jurassic Park (SNES video game) =

1993 video game

- North American box art
- Developer: Ocean of America
- Publishers: NA/EU: Ocean Software; JP: Jaleco
- Designers: J.H. Beard; C. Kerry
- Composer: Jon Dunn
- Series: Jurassic Park
- Platform: Super Nintendo Entertainment System
- Release: NA: October 1993; EU: December 29, 1993; JP: June 24, 1994
- Genre: Action-adventure
- Mode: Single-player

Jurassic Park is an action-adventure video game for the Super Nintendo Entertainment System (SNES), based on the 1990 novel and 1993 film of the same name. It was developed and published by Ocean Software in 1993 in North America and PAL regions, and published by Jaleco in 1994 in Japan.

The player controls Dr. Alan Grant, a paleontologist who has become trapped at Jurassic Park, an island theme park and zoo populated by genetically engineered dinosaurs. The game's exterior portion is viewed from a top-down perspective, but shifts to a first-person view during interior sections. The game garnered praise for these varied and three-dimensional perspectives, the usage of stereo sound, and the adventure gameplay. In 1994, Ocean released a sequel, Jurassic Park 2: The Chaos Continues, with gameplay which significantly differs from that of the original.

== Gameplay ==
Jurassic Park is based on the novel and film of the same name. Following a computer system failure, paleontologist Dr. Alan Grant and others become trapped at an island theme park, known as Jurassic Park, that is populated with dinosaurs.

Alan Grant protected from a Dilophosaurus by a large containment fence.

The player controls Grant, and begins the game armed with a cattle prod, although the game also features five other weapons: tranquilizer gun, shotgun, bolas, gas grenade launcher, and missile launcher. The game features seven different dinosaur enemies, as well as giant dragonflies. The player is given five lives, and two continues when all lives are lost. Grant's health is represented by a red health bar. Food and first-aid kits located throughout the game can replenish the player's health.

Motion sensors set up around the island allow characters in the game to communicate advice to the player, although some advice is deliberately malicious. If Grant loses a life, the player is restarted at the last motion sensor with which Grant came into contact. Mr. DNA, a character from the film, provides dinosaur facts to the player if the game is paused or remains idle for too long. The player must open and close multiple gates to travel around the island. The game's music changes depending on the player's location in the park.

The game's world is spacious and non-linear. The exterior portion, played from a top-down perspective, consists of a maze that is made up of jungle trees, along with rock formations, canals, fences, gates, and a number of buildings that can be entered and explored.

First-person view of a Velociraptor inside the Visitor Center.

The game switches to a first-person perspective when the player enters one of these buildings. The player must collect ID cards belonging to characters on the island in order to access certain rooms. Other rooms are completely dark and require night vision goggles to enter. Some buildings contain multiple floors that are accessed via elevators. Jurassic Park supports the Super NES Mouse when playing first-person sequences or operating computer terminals.

The objectives to win Jurassic Park are as follows:

- Collect all 18 dinosaur eggs that are scattered throughout the island.
- Turn on the generator to re-activate the park's motion sensors.
- Secure the Visitor Center from raptors entering the building.
- Kill all the dinosaurs that are on the ship.
- Destroy the raptor nest with a nerve gas bomb.
- Send S.O.S. and head to the helipad to be rescued by a helicopter.

The game does not utilize a password feature. The player, therefore, must play through the entire game in a single sitting.

== Development and release ==
Ocean Software, a British video game development company, paid an undisclosed six-figure sum to secure the rights to the Jurassic Park license to develop a game based on the film. Ocean had more developers working on Jurassic Park than any other project up to that point, which led to creative differences; however, Ocean's head of software development, Gary Bracey, said that "with such a great amount of artistic input, this was actually turned to an advantage." The game's designers were J.H. Beard and C. Kerry.

Jurassic Park was originally planned for release in August 1993. An early demo with outdated test graphics was unveiled to a disappointed audience at Chicago's Consumer Electronics Show in June 1993. Ocean executives in the U.K. were unaware of the demo's poor graphics, as the demo was developed at Ocean's offices in California. The developers, who were on a tight schedule, did not have time to create a better demo with improved graphics, as doing so could have compromised the game's completion date. The game's final graphics were vastly improved as development continued.

During development, Ocean had access to film stills and storyboards from the film. The game uses digitized photographs of the film's characters, as well as a digitized dinosaur image from the film. Ocean claimed the game was the first to utilize high-resolution backdrops. According to Bracey, "Steven Spielberg said he wanted a 'ground breaking' game. We feel this has been achieved due to the development of the 3D technology in the interior sections. Essentially, we're replicating the effects of the Super FX chip in the standard SNES hardware! Everyone seems to be pretty impressed." The game's first-person interior sections were created using texture mapping, a complex technique for the Super NES hardware to handle. The first-person segments utilized the effects of the system's Mode 7.

The dinosaurs' behavior was inspired by the film, and additional dinosaurs not shown in the film were added into the game for variety. A scene featured earlier in the game's development depicted Grant being eaten by a Tyrannosaurus rex, accompanied by the sound of his bones being crushed. Nintendo requested that the bone-crushing sound effect be removed as it was considered too realistic. The game includes inspiration from the novel, such as a mission objective to prevent dinosaurs from escaping to the mainland on a supply ship. The game was mastered in surround sound (Dolby Pro Logic), and its music was composed by Jon Dunn.

Jurassic Park was released in the United Kingdom in late 1993, and was also released in the United States that month. The game was released in Europe on December 29, 1993, and on June 24, 1994, in Japan, where it was published by Jaleco. In the United States, Ocean promoted "The Great Dino Egg Hunt", a contest in which players search the game for eight letters placed on the ground around the park. The letters then had to be decoded to reveal a secret message: "Dr. Horner". The answer was a reference to paleontologist Jack Horner, who was a consultant on the film. Two days after the game's release, the eventual winner of the contest correctly guessed the answer after playing the game for 10 hours. The winner, 29-year-old Bill Vargas from Philadelphia, was awarded with a $5,000 check.

To mark the film's 30th anniversary, Limited Run Games re-released the game in 2023, as part of Jurassic Park: Classic Games Collection. It was published for Nintendo Switch, PlayStation 4, PlayStation 5, and Xbox Series X/S. The game is also available individually through re-issued SNES cartridges. The 30th anniversary version features a save function, a world map, and the ability to rewind time. The digitized images of the characters from the film are removed in this version, possibly due to legal issues.

== Reception ==
Reception

Review scores
Publication	Score
Computer and Video Games	87/100
Edge	6/10
Electronic Gaming Monthly	8/10, 8/10; 7/10, 6/10
Famitsu	5/10, 4/10; 5/10, 4/10
GameFan	95%, 95%; 92%, 89% (Note: In GameFan's review, four critics each gave their own ranking.)
Super Play	89%
Total!	84%
Video Games (DE)	81%
Entertainment Weekly	A−
SNES Force	92%

Jurassic Park was praised for its graphics and sound. William Schiffmann of the Associated Press praised the sound effects for being recorded in Dolby Surround, but noted the lack of a password feature, calling it "one of the few drawbacks to an otherwise excellent cart." Though two of the four reviewers for Electronic Gaming Monthly commented that the game is too easy, all but one of the four had an overall positive opinion of the game, particularly praising the sound and the use of the 3-D perspective. Jonathan Davies of Super Play praised its problem-solving tasks and bird's-eye perspective, but criticized the game for being "a bit easy" and for not incorporating the film's musical score.

GamePro was most pleased with the game's varying perspectives and the way dinosaurs can catch players off-guard, especially when their view is limited in first-person perspective. They were also impressed by the detailed graphics and the stereo sound's accurate reflection of the position of the dinosaur which is making noise, and though they said the lack of a save feature is a serious concern due to the massive size of the game world, they added that the game would hold the player's interest through the multi-hour play session required to complete it. (Note: GamePro gave Jurassic Park 4.5/5 for graphics, 4.5/5 for sound, 4.0/5 for control, and 5.0/5 for fun factor.) SNES Force praised its "Huge playing area," and its many missions. Nintendo Power praised the game for "some game play elements that incorporate aspects of the hit movie," but also wrote, "The interior areas present few puzzles and it is easy to get lost in the outer areas." Edge found the game to be lacking excitement, writing that a large portion of time is spent "aimlessly wandering around and avoiding the dinosaurs – very little help is given in which direction you should be going and exactly what you should be doing". Nevertheless, the magazine concluded that "given the quality of most film tie-ins, Jurassic Park is one of the better licences. With slightly improved game design it could have been the best."

Bob Strauss of Entertainment Weekly called the game "truly innovative". Roy Bassave of Knight-Ridder News Service found it superior to the Sega CD version of Jurassic Park.

By January 1995, Jurassic Park had spent a non-consecutive period of 12 months on Nintendo Power's list of the top 20 SNES games. Game Informer declared the Genesis version of the game somewhat superior to the Super NES version in a 2012 comparison of the two games. In 2014, IGN included the game on its list of the most difficult games, citing various reasons that included the limited lives, the large game world, the scattered raptor eggs and key cards, and the lack of a save feature.
