= Jurassic World Evolution 3 =

- Developer: Frontier Developments
- Publisher: Frontier Developments
- Director: Andrew Fletcher
- Producers: Gary Richards; Craig Abraham; Samantha Marsh; Poppy Billett; Valentina Goward
- Designer: Mike Evans
- Programmer: Andy Scott
- Artist: Jonathan Bottone
- Writer: Ian Bousher
- Composer: Joanna Pena
- Series: Jurassic Park
- Platforms: PlayStation 5; Windows; Xbox Series X/S
- Release: 21 October 2025
- Genre: Construction and management simulation
- Mode: Single-player

Jurassic World Evolution 3 is a construction and management simulation video game developed and published by Frontier Developments. It is the sequel to Jurassic World Evolution 2 and was released for PlayStation 5, Microsoft Windows and Xbox Series X/S.

== Gameplay ==
The game introduces juvenile dinosaurs, which may have different needs when compared with their adult counterparts. Pictured is Lokiceratops.

Similar to its predecessors, Jurassic World Evolution 3 is a construction and management simulation video game which tasks players to build and manage their own Jurassic World-themed prehistoric theme park. The game features 99 species (with the wetlands pack and deluxe edition, 92 without) of prehistoric animals; 92 of them have their own distinct female, male, and juvenile variants. The game also introduced a broader suite of park creation tools, allowing players to modify a park's terrain extensively and place modular scenery items, similar to Frontier's other games like Planet Zoo and Planet Coaster. Parks, custom buildings and enclosures can also be shared with other players using Frontier Workshop.

Like previous entries, the game features a sandbox mode, which allows users to create their own park using any map from the campaign mode. Along with the campaign maps, the sandbox also features several returning maps from Jurassic World Evolution 2. New to the game's sandbox mode is the ability to generate a custom island, allowing players to customize the shape, elevation, and geographical features of the island.

There is also a challenge mode available from the menu screen. In the mode, players can choose from a list of scenarios that take place across different maps from the campaign mode. Players must meet certain conditions in order to complete a scenario, and are able to earn rewards based on their performance.

In addition to the sandbox and challenge modes, the game also features a campaign mode set in 10 locations such as Indonesia, Japan, and Hawaii. Jeff Goldblum reprises his role as Dr. Ian Malcolm in the campaign mode. In the campaign, which takes place after the events of the film Jurassic World Dominion, the player takes the role of a supervisor for the Dinosaur Integration Network (DIN), aiming to rehabilitate and care for dinosaurs in different conservation facilities across the world. During the events of the campaign, a group calling themselves Extinction Now, who believe dinosaurs should remain extinct, halts and sabotages player's progress in various ways.

With the introduction of gender variants, animals are able to breed, lay eggs, and raise offspring (called juveniles in game). This is done by placing a compatible nesting area in an enclosure that contains both a male and a female individual of the same species. Juvenile dinosaurs may inherit genetic traits from either of their parents, either behavioral or cosmetic. Along with their typical needs, a number of species also require a certain gender ratio to maintain social comfort. For example, several herd animals need at least one male in their social group to maintain maximum happiness. Environmental needs have been updated from previous entries. Along with tree, plant, and water coverage, animal comfort may also need a certain amount of pasture, barren, arid, or wetland area.

On the Xbox Series X/S and PlayStation 5 versions of the game, a "complexity meter" was introduced, which is designed to cap how much the player can build once the limit is reached. The meter is increased with both the introduction of animals and the placement of fences, buildings, and building pieces.

== Development and release ==
Jurassic World Evolution 3 was announced by Frontier Developments in May 2024. The game revealed its first trailer in June 2025. It was released for PlayStation 5, Microsoft Windows and Xbox Series X/S platforms on 21 October 2025. Players can also purchase the game's Deluxe Edition, which grants access to four additional animals (Protoceratops, Guanlong, Thanatosdrakon, and Concavenator), while players who pre-ordered the game gained access to the "Badlands Set", which includes items inspired by the dig site of the original Jurassic Park film. The game features new species which never appeared in the previous games: Lokiceratops, Ornithomimus, Caiuajara, Psittacosaurus, and Patagotitan. Although featured in previous games, Deinonychus was given an improved design which adds feathers in addition to the previous, scaled design. Before Evolution 3's release, Frontier Developments confirmed that Evolution 2's base game species will be returning in free updates throughout the game's lifespan, starting with Kentrosaurus in November. It continued with Majungasaurus in January, Cryolophosaurus in February, and Amargasaurus in March. Due to unknown issues, there were no species in April or May, though Dracorex and Liopleurodon were the species planned. Both were released on June 1, 2026, and later in the month, Cearadactylus was added as June's free species alongside the Rebirth Expansion. Two more were introduced in July, Torosaurus and Minmi, the latter a DLC animal from Jurassic World Evolution 2. Elasmosaurus was added as the free August species, Carcharodontosaurus returned in September with both its original design and a new redesign, and for the 1-year launch anniversary, Pentaceratops and Crichtonsaurus returned in October. From October onwards, two species have returned per month, continuing with Camarasaurus and Euoplocephalus in November. In December 2026, Nigersaurus and Tylosaurus will return.

On December 9, the first post-launch DLC was released, the "Wetlands Pack", which introduced Austroraptor, Hypsilophodon, and Irritator. The update paired with it also reintroduced Deinocheirus, a DLC animal from Jurassic World Evolution 2.

On June 16, the second post-launch DLC was released, the "Rebirth Expansion". This is a tie-in with the 2025 film Jurassic World Rebirth, adding the new species Aquilops, Titanosaurus, Mutadon, and Distortus rex, the latter two being fictional "mutants" from the film. In addition to the new species, the DLC also added film model variants for Tyrannosaurus, Spinosaurus, Quetzalcoatlus, and Mosasaurus, with film skins for both Velociraptor and Dilophosaurus based on their appearance in the film. The DLC is also the first expansion pack, adding a new campaign set in the early 2010s on the setting of Jurassic World Rebirth.

On August 11, the third post-launch DLC was released, the "Crocodilia Coast Pack," which introduced Deinosuchus, Postosuchus, Desmatosuchus, Shonisaurus, and Styxosaurus. The latter two were DLC animals in Jurassic World Evolution 2.

On September 29, the fourth post-launch DLC was released, the "Prehistoric East Pack," which introduced Nanshiungosaurus, Gobisaurus, Yangchuanosaurus, Sinosauropteryx, and Tarbosaurus. The latter two were DLC animals in Jurassic World Evolution 2.

In mid-December, a fifth post-launch DLC and the second expansion will be released.

== Reception ==
Reception

Aggregate scores
Aggregator	Score
Metacritic	(PC) 81/100 (PS5) 82/100 (XSXS) 78/100
OpenCritic	90% recommend

Review scores
Publication	Score
GamesRadar+	3.5/5
IGN	8/10
Push Square	8/10
Shacknews	9/10
TechRadar	3.5/5
VideoGamer.com	8/10

Jurassic World Evolution 3 received "generally favorable" reviews from critics, according to review aggregator website Metacritic. Fellow review aggregator OpenCritic assessed that the game received strong approval, being recommended by 90% of critics. The game was nominated for Best Sim/Strategy Game at The Game Awards 2025.

Many critics praised the improvements to the gameplay formula, and considered the game to be the best in the series. Shacknews thought that Jurassic World Evolution 3 brought the series to its full potential, and also commended the addition of juvenile dinosaurs and improvements to game's customization options.

Critics also praised the increased depth given to the animals in the game, along with the graphics and visuals. VideoGamer wrote that the dinosaurs in Jurassic World Evolution 3 seem more believable and realistic, saying that each species in the game acts as part of a living ecosystem, where families are grouped together with males, females and cubs. TheGamer lauded the visual design and behaviors of the dinosaurs, calling them "gorgeous and endlessly fascinating to watch", and wrote that the game was "the most beautiful the series has ever looked". Polygon described the graphics as "stunning", and praised the amount of visual detail visible up close.

A more mixed review came from Josh Russell of TechRadar, who called managing the comfort of the animals "a bit of a chore" and discouraged buying the game if the players did not enjoy micromanagement, but was overall positive, deeming the game a satisfying evolution of the series.

=== Sales ===
The game sold more than 500,000 units within two weeks of its release.
