= Jurassic Park III: Park Builder =

2001 video game

- North American box art
- Developer: Konami
- Publisher: Konami
- Series: Jurassic Park
- Platform: Game Boy Advance
- Release: JP: August 9, 2001; NA: September 12, 2001; UK: October 12, 2001
- Genre: Construction and management simulation
- Mode: Single-player

Jurassic Park III: Park Builder is a 2001 construction and management simulation game developed and published by Konami for the Game Boy Advance.

It is the second game in the Jurassic Park III series of titles for the Game Boy Advance after The DNA Factor, and is followed by Island Attack.

== Summary ==
Jurassic Park III: Park Builder challenges the player to design and run an island-based Jurassic Park theme park, similar to Jurassic Park: Operation Genesis. The player must first send an excavation team to one of eight worldwide locations to search for fossilized mosquitoes that contain dinosaur DNA, which is then used to create dinosaurs.

The player can place structures in the park such as hotels, restaurants and shops. Hurricanes and earthquakes can damage the park's buildings. The player must advertise the park in order to attract more customers. Visitors to the park must view the dinosaurs while riding on tour buses. The player begins with three buses and can purchase more later.

The player is given a maximum of eight holding pens for however many dinosaurs the park may have. There are six different environments on the island, including jungles, a beach, plains, and a desert. Dinosaurs can become ill and require medical attention. To keep them healthy, the dinosaurs are placed in environments that closely resemble their natural habitat.

The game features 140 creatures, including Brachiosaurus, Mosasaurus, Pteranodon, Spinosaurus, Stegosaurus and Tyrannosaurus. The dinosaurs, depending on their size and aggression, are grouped into six categories: three for carnivores and three for herbivores.

== Reception ==
Reception

Aggregate scores
Aggregator	Score
GameRankings	68.54%
Metacritic	65/100

Review scores
Publication	Score
AllGame	2/5
Computer and Video Games	7/10
Game Informer	7.25/10
IGN	7/10
Nintendo Power	3.5/5

The game was met with average to mixed reception, as GameRankings gave it a score of 68.54%, while Metacritic gave it 65 out of 100.

AllGame criticized the game for its few sound effects and "generic background music", as well as the need to "constantly switch back and forth" between different menu screens, "making it easy to forget what you're doing in relation to what needs to be done."

IGN wrote a positive review but criticized the game for its lack of a tutorial mode: "It's a very complex game with tons of little elements to manage...and it's boggling to see that the developers don't offer even the most basic tutorial for beginner park builders. Right from the get-go, you're thrust into the game without knowing what does what, or how you're supposed to do it."

== See also ==
- List of Jurassic Park video games
