= Jurassic Park video games =

Video game franchise

Jurassic Park
- Genre: Various: Action Adventure Construction and management simulation First-person shooter Platform
- Developers: Various: Ocean Software BlueSky Software Sega of America Universal Interactive Sega AM3 DreamWorks Interactive Appaloosa Interactive Aspect Co. Tiger Electronics Torus Games Black Ops Entertainment Knowledge Adventure Mobile21 Konami Blue Tongue Entertainment Brighter Minds Media, Inc. Gameloft Telltale Games Ludia Raw Thrills TT Fusion Frontier Developments; Coatsink
- Publisher: Various: Ocean Software Sega Universal Interactive Electronic Arts Tiger Electronics THQ Knowledge Adventure Konami Brighter Minds Media, Inc. Gameloft Ludia Warner Bros. Interactive Entertainment Frontier Developments
- Platforms: Various: NES Game Boy Genesis Super NES Game Gear Master System Sega CD Amiga 3DO Arcade PlayStation Saturn Game.com R-Zone Game Boy Advance PlayStation 2 Xbox PlayStation 3 Wii Xbox 360 Nintendo 3DS PlayStation 4 PlayStation Vita Wii U Xbox One; Nintendo Switch; Oculus Quest; Oculus Quest 2
- First release: Jurassic Park (NES); June 1993
- Latest release: Jurassic World Evolution 3 October 21, 2025
- Parent series: Jurassic Park

Numerous video games based on the Jurassic Park franchise have been released. Developers Ocean Software, BlueSky Software and Sega produced various games in 1993, coinciding with the first film, Jurassic Park. In 1997, several developers, including DreamWorks Interactive and Appaloosa Interactive, produced various games for nine different platforms to coincide with the release of the film The Lost World: Jurassic Park.

For the 2001 film, Jurassic Park III, a total of seven games were produced, including three for the Game Boy Advance and three PC games. A park-building game, Jurassic Park: Operation Genesis, was released in 2003. Jurassic Park: The Game, released in 2011, takes place after the events of the first film. Lego Jurassic World was released in 2015 and is based on the first four films. Subsequent games have continued to use the Jurassic World name, including Jurassic World Evolution, another park-building game that was released in 2018.

Since 1994, a number of other video games, not based directly on any of the films, have also been released.

== Jurassic Park (1993) ==
Ocean Software released three distinct Jurassic Park games optimized for different platforms, while Sega released four distinct versions of Jurassic Park for five different platforms. In each version, the player has to complete several objectives to finish the game and escape the island of Isla Nublar.

=== Ocean Software ===
Ocean Software devoted two of its development teams to work on several Jurassic Park games, making it the biggest film license that the company had ever worked on.

Jurassic Park, released for the Nintendo Entertainment System (NES) and Nintendo's Game Boy, is an action-adventure game played from an overhead perspective, with various goals that loosely follow the plot of the film. The NES version was released in June 1993, followed shortly by the Game Boy version, which is a port of the earlier version.

Another variation was the Super NES version of Jurassic Park, which incorporates isometric gameplay for outside environments but uses a first person perspective for indoor environments. Objectives include turning on the park's power system and rebooting the main computers, as well as collecting raptor eggs.

Ocean also released a computer version of Jurassic Park for MS-DOS and Amiga. As in the Super NES version, the PC and Amiga versions also feature isometric and first-person shooter perspectives.

=== Sega ===
Sega published a side-scrolling platformer action game titled Jurassic Park for the Sega Genesis. Developed by BlueSky Software, the game can be played in two modes, either as Dr. Alan Grant or as a Velociraptor. Playing as each provides the user with an alternative story and different levels.

Another Jurassic Park game, developed and published by Sega, was released for the Game Gear and Master System in 1993. It is a side-scrolling platform game which includes several driving levels.

A point-and-click adventure game, titled Jurassic Park as well, was released in 1994. It was developed and published by Sega for the Sega CD (also known as the Mega-CD). The game's events take place after the film. The player controls a scientist who becomes stranded on Isla Nublar after a helicopter crash. The player must search the island to retrieve eggs from seven different dinosaur species and place them in an incubator at the Jurassic Park visitor center.

Also in 1994, Sega released a rail shooter arcade game titled Jurassic Park. It features missions that involve the player using a joystick to protect a vehicle by shooting any targets that appear on screen. The machine's cabinet resembles the rear of the film's Ford Explorer tour vehicles and contains hydraulic pistons to move the seat according to action on the screen.

== Sequels and other games (1994–1996) ==
A sequel to the Sega Genesis version of Jurassic Park, entitled Jurassic Park: Rampage Edition, was released in 1994, and immediately follows the events of its predecessor. In it, Grant's helicopter crashes on Isla Nublar after taking off from the island. Now he must deal not only with dinosaurs, but InGen soldiers as well. As in the game's predecessor, the player can play as either Grant or a Velociraptor.

Additionally, Universal Interactive released Jurassic Park Interactive exclusively on the 3DO Interactive Multiplayer in 1994. The game plays out through eight different minigames and features FMV segments starring look-alikes of the main characters. Also in 1994, Hi Tech Entertainment released Jurassic Park: Paint and Activity Center, a painting activity game for MS-DOS.

Ocean developed an action side-scrolling platform game titled Jurassic Park 2: The Chaos Continues and released it for the SNES and Game Boy in 1995. The SNES version uses an original story and is a sequel to the film, while the Game Boy version reuses the film's plot. In the SNES version, which takes place one year after the events of the film, the player controls Dr. Alan Grant, who is sent to Isla Nublar by John Hammond to prevent BioSyn (a rival genetics company) from stealing dinosaurs from the island.

On August 12, 1996, Universal launched an online game titled Jurassic Park – The Ride Online Adventure, to promote Jurassic Park: The Ride. In the game, the player controls Jurassic Park's director of operations, who must stop an escaped Velociraptor that is wandering inside a compound, where the game takes place. The player must walk through hallways while avoiding the Velociraptor. The player must search in offices and other rooms for objects that can be used and combined with one another to stop the Velociraptor or gain entry to new areas. The game includes a feature known as the "IntraNet", which contains files on the park's employees and records, as well as information on InGen and its dinosaurs.

== The Lost World: Jurassic Park (1997) ==
To coincide with The Lost World: Jurassic Park, the second film in the series, studio DreamWorks utilized its internal software company, DreamWorks Interactive, to create their own game.

For the PlayStation and Sega Saturn, DreamWorks and Appaloosa Interactive developed The Lost World: Jurassic Park, a side-scrolling platform game portrayed in a 3D rendered environment. The game has five playable characters and 30 levels. In 1998, an updated version of The Lost World: Jurassic Park was released for the PlayStation, with improved gameplay.

Appaloosa Interactive developed another version of The Lost World: Jurassic Park that was published by Sega for the Sega Genesis. Played from an overhead view, the game contains levels brought together by four hub areas on Isla Sorna and also contains four unique boss levels. It also has driveable vehicles, a large number of dinosaurs, and a GPS system used for mission objectives.

Four versions of the game were developed and published by different companies for handheld game consoles, including the Game Boy, Game Gear, and Tiger Electronics' Game.com and R-Zone consoles.

DreamWorks also released Chaos Island: The Lost World, a strategy video game for Microsoft Windows, with similar gameplay to Command & Conquer. The game is played across 12 levels, and involves the player creating dinosaurs that can be controlled and used against enemies. Six actors from the film provided their voice to the game.

An arcade game titled The Lost World: Jurassic Park was also released by Sega, and made use of the Model 3 arcade hardware.

In 1998, a first-person shooter titled Trespasser was released for Windows, billed as a digital sequel to the film The Lost World: Jurassic Park. The game was highly ambitious with one of the first large scale physics engines in an action game. The developer was pushed by the publisher. This meant many elements of the planned game design were shelved and many bugs, some major, still remained in the game, resulting in negative critical reception. In April 2002, the game received a large modding community called TresCom, which released many patches and graphical updates for download on their forums.

== Warpath: Jurassic Park (1999) ==
In 1999, DreamWorks released Warpath: Jurassic Park, a fighting game for the PlayStation, featuring 14 playable dinosaurs and arenas based on locations from the first two films.

== Jurassic Park III (2001) ==
To coincide with the third film in the series, Jurassic Park III, a number of video games were released for the PC, arcade and Game Boy Advance.

Knowledge Adventure developed and published two video games aimed primarily at a younger target audience: a side-scrolling platformer titled Jurassic Park III: Dino Defender; and Jurassic Park III: Danger Zone!, in which the player moves around on a virtual board game map. Later that year, Knowledge Adventure produced Scan Command: Jurassic Park, which utilized a portable barcode scanner accessory known as the Scan Command.

A light gun arcade game titled Jurassic Park III was developed and published by Konami in 2001. Players control the mercenary team sent to Isla Sorna to rescue survivors. AllGame's Jon Thompson rated it three and a half stars out of five, criticizing its outdated graphics while praising the music and sound.

Also in 2001, Konami published three games for the Game Boy Advance, two of which were also developed by the company:

- Jurassic Park III: Island Attack was developed by Mobile21. The game is an isometric action-adventure game, where one plays as Dr. Alan Grant trying to escape Isla Sorna by traversing the 8 different game environments to reach a rescue boat. The game allows the player to choose to run from many of the enemies encountered, or collect and use items to destroy them.
- Jurassic Park III: The DNA Factor is a side-scrolling platformer with many puzzle-solving elements. The game allows the player to play as either a professional photographer or pilot to search Isla Sorna for the DNA of dinosaurs. Each level involves fighting dinosaurs while searching for all of the DNA to open the exit. Then, using the collected DNA, the player must correctly create different species of dinosaurs, which becomes increasingly complex as the game progresses.
- Jurassic Park III: Park Builder is a construction and management simulation game viewed from an omnipotent perspective. In the game, the player creates a virtual amusement park that includes rides, shops, food outlets, and dinosaur facilities.

Announced in 2001, Jurassic Park: Survival was a third-person adventure game in development by Savage Entertainment for the PlayStation 2 and Xbox, as well as the GameCube and PC. However, due to conflicts with Vivendi Universal over payments, the game was canceled.

== Universal Studios Theme Parks Adventure (2001) ==
In 2001, Universal Studios Theme Parks Adventure was released for the GameCube. Based on many of the Universal theme park rides, the Jurassic Park ride requires the player to take control of a gun turret on the back of a Jeep to defend against dinosaurs.

== Jurassic Park: Dinosaur Battles (2002) ==
A PC game titled Jurassic Park: Dinosaur Battles, also produced by Knowledge Adventure, was released on September 10, 2002. Dinosaur Battles is basically Scan Command: Jurassic Park without the portable scanner accessory. The game involves a group of young explorers stranded on Isla Sorna, where the evil Dr. Corts (voiced by Kath Soucie) has carried out experiments to control dinosaurs and pit them against each other for fights.

The game features six playable creatures throughout the game, each one with six primary skills to defend against Corts' creatures. Before playing against enemies, the player must arrange pieces of dinosaur DNA to enable each creature's skills. Unlike Scan Command, which requires the player to scan barcodes to receive DNA, Dinosaur Battles presents the player with a list of more than 500 DNA pieces.

The game primarily consists of the player controlling a creature from a top-down perspective while carrying out tasks such as locating certain facilities. During this portion of the game, enemy dinosaurs often randomly challenge the player to a battle. The player can fight or choose to abandon the battle. In 2018, Zack Zwiezen of Kotaku ranked the game among the "weirdest" Jurassic Park games ever released, stating that it was like Warpath: Jurassic Park but with an "unnecessary and weird" storyline and "less fun" combat.

== Jurassic Park: Operation Genesis (2003) ==
In March 2003, Vivendi Universal Games released Jurassic Park: Operation Genesis, a park-building video game developed by Blue Tongue Entertainment that allows players to recreate their own Jurassic Park, featuring 25 dinosaurs and a multitude of rides, shops and other attractions. The game was released on Xbox, PlayStation 2 and PC.

== Jurassic Park Institute Tour: Dinosaur Rescue (2003) ==
Jurassic Park Institute Tour: Dinosaur Rescue is an action video game featuring a collection of minigames. It was developed and published by Rocket Company and released for the Game Boy Advance exclusively in Japan on July 18, 2003. The game was sold exclusively through the Jurassic Park Institute Tour, a large educational travelling exhibition in Japan. In 2018, Zack Zwiezen of Kotaku noted that the minigames were "simple, but the art is colorful and cute".

== Later Jurassic Park games (2007–2015) ==
In August 2007, Brighter Minds Media, Inc. and Universal released Jurassic Park Explorer, an interactive DVD game and board game that are played together. The goal of the game, set on Isla Sorna, is to resurrect dinosaurs by progressing along the game board and completing each of the DVD game's seven mini-games. The DVD game also includes over 300 dinosaur trivia questions and clips from the first three films.

In August 2010, Gameloft released Jurassic Park, an action/adventure mobile game based on the first film. As Dr. Alan Grant or Dr. Ian Malcolm, the player must escape from Isla Nublar while fighting against dinosaurs, mercenaries, and poachers. The player can also play as a T. rex. Jurassic Park: The Game, a four-part episodic adventure game series set after the events of the first film, was developed and published by Telltale Games on November 15, 2011, for Xbox 360, PlayStation 3, PC and Mac.

Jurassic Park is among the films featured in Universal Movie Tycoon, an iPhone game developed and published by Fuse Powered Inc. in March 2012. In the game, the player creates a movie studio and subsequently recreates films that were released by Universal Pictures. Jurassic Park Builder, developed and published by Ludia in July 2012, is a construction and management simulation video game in which the player builds a Jurassic Park theme park. An Aquatic Park with aquatic animals and a Glacier Park with extinct animals from the Cenozoic era can also be constructed.

A fan-created project, titled Jurassic Park: Aftermath, is not a full video game, instead featuring Isla Nublar's Jurassic Park as an interactive environment that can be explored. The project had been in development since at least March 2013, using the CryEngine 3 game engine, but development had been suspended by May 2016. A new arcade game, titled Jurassic Park Arcade and developed by Raw Thrills, was released in March 2015, and is based on the original trilogy in the film series.

== Jurassic World series ==
There have been several video games based on the Jurassic World series. Ludia released an updated version of Jurassic Park Builder in April 2015, titled Jurassic World: The Game, for iOS mobile devices.

=== Lego Jurassic World ===
Lego Jurassic World, an action-adventure video game developed by Traveller's Tales and published by Warner Bros. Interactive Entertainment, was released for eight different game systems on June 12, 2015, coinciding with the film's theatrical release. An OS X port by Feral Interactive followed shortly thereafter, on 23 July. The game is based on the series' first four films, and was later released for Android and iOS on March 31, 2016. A Nintendo Switch version was released on September 17, 2019.

=== Jurassic World Survivor ===
By June 2014, Cryptic Studios was developing a third-person open-world video game, similar to H1Z1 and based on Jurassic World, in which the player would assume the role of Owen Grady. The game was being developed with the Unreal Engine 4 game engine, and was nearly finished when it was cancelled in May 2015, after the closure of Cryptic Studios' Seattle location. It was to be released on Steam, Xbox Live, and the PlayStation Network. In June 2016, the game was reported to be in development by a different studio (later revealed to be Splash Damage), with Perfect World Entertainment as publisher. In October, Perfect World reserved a web domain for the game at JurassicWorldSurvivor.com. Two months later, the company filed a trademark for Jurassic World Survivor.

=== Jurassic World Alive ===
Jurassic World Alive, a Pokémon Go-style game, allows the player to build a collection of dinosaurs that can be used in battles against other players. The game also allows players to create their own dinosaurs using hybrid DNA as well as fusing dinosaurs with Cenozoic and Paleozoic creatures. The game was developed by Ludia and co-published with Universal, and released in May 2018 for iOS and Android. The game included more than 100 dinosaurs upon its release, and more are expected to be added in regular updates. The game was first released in Canada on March 14, 2018.

=== Jurassic World Evolution games ===
Jurassic World Evolution is a park-building game released in June 2018, coinciding with the release of the fifth film, Jurassic World: Fallen Kingdom. The game is based on the 2015 film, and was developed and published by Frontier Developments. In addition to management and simulation, the game also features creature development. A Nintendo Switch port of the game, titled Jurassic World Evolution: Complete Edition, was released on November 3, 2020.

Jurassic World Evolution 2, also by Frontier, was released on November 9, 2021, on PC, PlayStation 4, PlayStation 5, Xbox One, and Xbox Series X and Series S. It is set between the events of Jurassic World: Fallen Kingdom and Jurassic World Dominion.

Jurassic World Evolution 3 released on October 21, 2025, for PC, PlayStation 5, and Xbox Series X/S. The campaign of the game takes place after the events of Jurassic World Dominion.

=== Jurassic World Aftermath ===
Jurassic World Aftermath is a virtual reality game for the Oculus Quest and Oculus Quest 2. Developed by Coatsink, it was released on December 17, 2020. The game takes place on Isla Nublar, two years after the events of Jurassic World, and prior to the events of Jurassic World: Fallen Kingdom. Much of the gameplay is focused on the player avoiding raptors in a facility. In 2021, Coatsink released Jurassic World Aftermath: Part 2, a continuation in the form of paid downloadable content.

=== Other games ===
Characters and settings from Jurassic World appear in the 2015 crossover toys-to-life video game Lego Dimensions. Online slot developer Microgaming released Jurassic World, a slot game for desktop and mobile devices, on June 20, 2017.

A virtual reality game titled VRSE Jurassic World was created by Skyrocket, LLC. In the United States, the game was released for iOS on August 8, 2017, while an Android version was released the following month.

Jurassic World VR Expedition, another virtual reality game, launched in June 2018. It is exclusive to the Dave & Buster's chain, and debuted at all 114 locations in the U.S. The game uses HTC Vive headsets and supports up to four players, and takes place after the events of the first Jurassic World film. As park rangers, players are tasked with rounding up dinosaurs that broke free during the film. The in-game dinosaurs were developed using digital models created by Industrial Light & Magic for the films. Jurassic World VR Expedition was well received.

In August 2020, Mojang Studios released a Jurassic World-themed package of downloadable content (DLC) for its online game Minecraft.

An iOS and Android mobile game, Jurassic World Primal Ops, was developed by Behaviour Interactive. It is an action-adventure game viewed from a top-down perspective. The player traverses North America rescuing dinosaurs from poachers, mercenaries, and science research. Rescued dinosaurs become battle companions, each with their own ability. The game received a soft launch in certain countries in January 2022, and was officially released on June 30, 2022.

== Jurassic Park: Classic Games Collection ==
In 2023, Limited Run Games announced plans to re-release several games to commemorate the 30th anniversary of the original Jurassic Park film. Jurassic Park: Classic Games Collection is a compilation of the following games:

- Jurassic Park (1993) for the Nintendo Entertainment System and Game Boy
- Jurassic Park (1993) for the Super Nintendo
- Jurassic Park (1993) for the Sega Genesis
- Jurassic Park: Rampage Edition (1994) for the Sega Genesis
- Jurassic Park 2: The Chaos Continues (1994/95) for the Super Nintendo and Game Boy

The collection introduces gameplay improvements, such as save states, in-game maps, and a rewind option. The collection was released for Nintendo Switch, PlayStation 4, PlayStation 5, and Xbox Series X/S, and received a digital release on November 22, 2023. Limited Run Games also re-issued the individual games on cartridges to be played on the original consoles. The collection was later delisted from sale on March 31, 2026.

Several critics rated the collection 3 stars out of 5, offering praise for the gameplay improvements. However, Benjamin Jakobs of Eurogamer felt there should have been more new features and improvements. The game lineup received some criticism. Chris Jackson of Starburst noted the absence of obscure games that "might have made for a more interesting and varied collection". He further wrote that while the included games had not aged well, the collection would appeal to those who grew up with them. PJ O'Reilly of Nintendo Life rated it 6 out of 10 and praised the improvements as well, but also criticized the lineup, writing that the collection "sticks resolutely with older games that haven't aged particularly well, failing to show off any of the variety or inherent goofiness in some of the many different titles that these movies have produced over the decades."

== Jurassic Park: Survival ==
Jurassic Park: Survival is an upcoming action-adventure game from developer and publisher Saber Interactive. Announced in December 2023, it will release for the PlayStation 5, Microsoft Windows, and Xbox Series X/S.

The game is set one day after the events of the first Jurassic Park film, and will include locations and dinosaurs featured in the film, as well as new ones. The development team worked with Amblin Entertainment and closely examined the film as well as production materials, such as props and on-set photographs. The player assumes the role of Maya Joshi, a young InGen scientist who was left behind on Isla Nublar. The game is played from a first-person perspective and the player must explore the island while avoiding its numerous dinosaurs, who exhibit distinct and adaptive behavior. The player can outsmart the dinosaurs, with stealth emphasized over combat. Payal Mistry provides the voice of Joshi and also did motion capture for the role.

== Video games ==
=== Titles released in the 1990s ===
Game	Details
Jurassic Park Original release date(s): NA: 1993; EU: 1993	Release years by system: 1993—NES, Game Boy
Jurassic Park Original release date(s): NA: 1993; EU: 1993	Notes: Developed by Ocean Software.; Published by Ocean Software.; Based on the 1993 film Jurassic Park.
Jurassic Park Original release date(s): NA: 1993; EU: 1993	Release years by system: 1993—SNES
Jurassic Park Original release date(s): NA: 1993; EU: 1993	Notes: Developed by Ocean Software.; Published by Ocean Software.; Based on the 1993 film Jurassic Park.
Jurassic Park Original release date(s): NA: 1993; EU: 1993	Release years by system: 1993—Genesis/Mega Drive
Jurassic Park Original release date(s): NA: 1993; EU: 1993	Notes: Developed by Sega.; Published by Sega.; Based on the 1993 film Jurassic Park.
Jurassic Park Original release date(s): NA: 1993; EU: 1993	Release years by system: 1993—Game Gear, Master System
Jurassic Park Original release date(s): NA: 1993; EU: 1993	Notes: Developed by Sega.; Published by Sega.; Based on the 1993 film Jurassic Park.
Jurassic Park Original release date(s): NA: 1993; EU: 1993	Release years by system: 1993—Sega CD
Jurassic Park Original release date(s): NA: 1993; EU: 1993	Notes: Developed by Sega.; Published by Sega.; Based on the 1993 film Jurassic Park.
Jurassic Park Original release date(s): EU: 1993; NA: 1994	Release years by system: 1993—Amiga, MS-DOS
Jurassic Park Original release date(s): EU: 1993; NA: 1994	Notes: Developed by Ocean Software.; Published by Ocean Software.; Based on the 1993 film Jurassic Park.
Jurassic Park Original release date(s): NA: 1994; EU: 1994	Release years by system: 1994—Arcade
Jurassic Park Original release date(s): NA: 1994; EU: 1994	Notes: Developed by Sega.; Published by Sega.; Based on the 1993 film Jurassic Park.
Jurassic Park 2: The Chaos Continues Original release date(s): NA: 1994; EU: 1994	Release years by system: 1994—SNES, Game Boy
Jurassic Park 2: The Chaos Continues Original release date(s): NA: 1994; EU: 1994	Notes: Developed by Ocean Software.; Published by Ocean Software.; Based on the 1993 film Jurassic Park.
Jurassic Park Interactive Original release date(s): NA: 1994; EU: 1994	Release years by system: 1994—3DO
Jurassic Park Interactive Original release date(s): NA: 1994; EU: 1994	Notes: Developed by Universal Interactive.; Published by Universal Interactive.; Based on the 1993 film Jurassic Park.
Jurassic Park: Rampage Edition Original release date(s): NA: 1994; EU: 1994	Release years by system: 1994—Genesis/Mega Drive
Jurassic Park: Rampage Edition Original release date(s): NA: 1994; EU: 1994	Notes: Developed by BlueSky Software.; Published by Sega.; Based on the 1993 film Jurassic Park.
Jurassic Park: Paint and Activity Center Original release date(s): NA: 1994; EU: 1994	Release years by system: 1994—MS-DOS
Jurassic Park: Paint and Activity Center Original release date(s): NA: 1994; EU: 1994	Notes: Developed by Hi Tech Entertainment.; Published by Hi Tech Entertainment.; Based on the 1993 film Jurassic Park.
Jurassic Park – The Ride Online Adventure Original release date(s): NA: 1996; EU: 1996	Release years by system: 1996—Online
Jurassic Park – The Ride Online Adventure Original release date(s): NA: 1996; EU: 1996	Notes: Developed by Universal.; Published by Universal.; Based on the 1993 film Jurassic Park.
The Lost World: Jurassic Park Original release date(s): NA: 1997; EU: 1997	Release years by system: 1997—PlayStation, Sega Saturn
The Lost World: Jurassic Park Original release date(s): NA: 1997; EU: 1997	Notes: Developed by DreamWorks Interactive and Appaloosa Interactive.; Published by Electronic Arts and Sega.; Based on the 1997 film The Lost World: Jurassic Park.
The Lost World: Jurassic Park Original release date(s): NA: 1997; EU: 1997	Release years by system: 1997—Genesis/Mega Drive
The Lost World: Jurassic Park Original release date(s): NA: 1997; EU: 1997	Notes: Developed by Appaloosa Interactive.; Published by Sega.; Based on the 1997 film The Lost World: Jurassic Park.
The Lost World: Jurassic Park Original release date(s): NA: 1997; EU: 1997	Release years by system: 1997—Game Boy, Game Gear, Game.com, R-Zone
The Lost World: Jurassic Park Original release date(s): NA: 1997; EU: 1997	Notes: Developed by Aspect (Game Gear), Tiger (Game.com) and Torus (Game Boy).; Published by Sega (Game Gear), Tiger (Game.com and R-Zone) and THQ (Game Boy).; Based on the 1997 film The Lost World: Jurassic Park.
Chaos Island: The Lost World Original release date(s): NA: 1997; EU: 1997	Release years by system: 1997—Windows
Chaos Island: The Lost World Original release date(s): NA: 1997; EU: 1997	Notes: Developed by DreamWorks Interactive.; Published by DreamWorks Interactive.; Based on the 1997 film The Lost World: Jurassic Park.
The Lost World: Jurassic Park Original release date(s): NA: 1997; EU: 1997	Release years by system: 1997—Arcade
The Lost World: Jurassic Park Original release date(s): NA: 1997; EU: 1997	Notes: Developed by Sega AM3.; Published by Sega.; Based on the 1997 film The Lost World: Jurassic Park.
Trespasser Original release date(s): NA: 1998; EU: 1998	Release years by system: 1998—Windows
Trespasser Original release date(s): NA: 1998; EU: 1998	Notes: Developed by DreamWorks Interactive.; Published by Electronic Arts.; Based on the 1997 film The Lost World: Jurassic Park.
Warpath: Jurassic Park Original release date(s): NA: 1999; EU: 1999	Release years by system: 1999—PlayStation
Warpath: Jurassic Park Original release date(s): NA: 1999; EU: 1999	Notes: Developed by Black Ops Entertainment and DreamWorks Interactive.; Published by Electronic Arts.; Based on the 1993 film Jurassic Park and the 1997 film The Lost World: Jurassic Park.

=== Titles released in the 2000s ===
Game	Details
Jurassic Park III: Dino Defender Original release date(s): NA: 2001; EU: 2001	Release years by system: 2001—Windows/Mac
Jurassic Park III: Dino Defender Original release date(s): NA: 2001; EU: 2001	Notes: Developed by Knowledge Adventure.; Published by Knowledge Adventure.; Based on the 2001 film Jurassic Park III.
Jurassic Park III: Danger Zone! Original release date(s): NA: 2001; EU: 2001	Release years by system: 2001—Windows
Jurassic Park III: Danger Zone! Original release date(s): NA: 2001; EU: 2001	Notes: Developed by Knowledge Adventure.; Published by Knowledge Adventure.; Based on the 2001 film Jurassic Park III.
Jurassic Park III Original release date(s): JP: 2001; NA: 2002	Release years by system: 2001—Arcade
Jurassic Park III Original release date(s): JP: 2001; NA: 2002	Notes: Developed by Konami.; Published by Konami.; Based on the 2001 film Jurassic Park III.
Jurassic Park III: Island Attack Original release date(s): JP: 2001; NA: 2001; PAL: 2002	Release years by system: 2001—Game Boy Advance
Jurassic Park III: Island Attack Original release date(s): JP: 2001; NA: 2001; PAL: 2002	Notes: Developed by Mobile21.; Published by Konami.; Based on the 2001 film Jurassic Park III.
Jurassic Park III: The DNA Factor Original release date(s): JP: 2001; NA: 2001; PAL: 2001	Release years by system: 2001—Game Boy Advance
Jurassic Park III: The DNA Factor Original release date(s): JP: 2001; NA: 2001; PAL: 2001	Notes: Developed by Konami Computer Entertainment Hawaii; Published by Konami.; Based on the 2001 film Jurassic Park III.
Jurassic Park III: Park Builder Original release date(s): JP: 2001; NA: 2001; PAL: 2001	Release years by system: 2001—Game Boy Advance
Jurassic Park III: Park Builder Original release date(s): JP: 2001; NA: 2001; PAL: 2001	Notes: Developed by Konami.; Published by Konami.; Based on the 2001 film Jurassic Park III.
Scan Command: Jurassic Park Original release date(s): NA: 2001; EU: 2001	Release years by system: 2001—Windows
Scan Command: Jurassic Park Original release date(s): NA: 2001; EU: 2001	Notes: Based on the 2001 film Jurassic Park III.
Jurassic Park: Dinosaur Battles Original release date(s): NA: 2002; EU: 2002	Release years by system: 2002—Windows
Jurassic Park: Dinosaur Battles Original release date(s): NA: 2002; EU: 2002	Notes: Developed by Knowledge Adventures.; Published by Knowledge Adventures.; Based on the 2001 film Jurassic Park III.; Basically Scan Command: Jurassic Park without the barcode scanner.
Jurassic Park: Operation Genesis Original release date(s): NA: 2003; EU: 2003	Release years by system: 2003—Windows, PlayStation 2, Xbox
Jurassic Park: Operation Genesis Original release date(s): NA: 2003; EU: 2003	Notes: Developed by Blue Tongue Entertainment.; Published by Universal Interactive and Konami.; Based on the 1993 film Jurassic Park, the 1997 film The Lost World: Jurassic Park, and the 2001 film Jurassic Park III.
Jurassic Park Institute Tour: Dinosaur Rescue Original release date(s):	Release years by system: 2003—Game Boy Advance
Jurassic Park Institute Tour: Dinosaur Rescue Original release date(s):	Notes: Developed by Rocket Company.; Published by Rocket Company.; Based on the 1993 film Jurassic Park, the 1997 film The Lost World: Jurassic Park, and the 2001 film Jurassic Park III.
Jurassic Park Explorer Original release date(s): NA: 2007	Release years by system: 2007—DVD players
Jurassic Park Explorer Original release date(s): NA: 2007	Notes: Developed by Brighter Minds Media, Inc; Published by Brighter Minds Media, Inc; Based on the 1993 film Jurassic Park, the 1997 film The Lost World: Jurassic Park, and the 2001 film Jurassic Park III.

=== Titles released in the 2010s ===
Game	Details
Jurassic Park Original release date(s): NA: 2010; EU: 2010	Release years by system: 2010—Mobile
Jurassic Park Original release date(s): NA: 2010; EU: 2010	Notes: Developed by Gameloft.; Published by Gameloft.; Based on the 1993 film Jurassic Park.
Jurassic Park: The Game Original release date(s): NA: 2011; EU: 2011	Release years by system: 2011—Windows, OS X, PlayStation 3, Xbox 360, iOS
Jurassic Park: The Game Original release date(s): NA: 2011; EU: 2011	Notes: Developed by Telltale Games.; Published by Telltale Games.; Based on the 1993 film Jurassic Park.
Jurassic Park Builder Original release date(s): NA: 2012; EU: 2012	Release years by system: 2012—iOS, Android, Microsoft Windows
Jurassic Park Builder Original release date(s): NA: 2012; EU: 2012	Notes: Developed by Ludia.; Published by Ludia.; Based on the 1993 film Jurassic Park, the 1997 film The Lost World: Jurassic Park, and the 2001 film Jurassic Park III.
Jurassic Park Online Slot Original release date(s): NA: 2014; EU: 2014	Release years by system: 2014—Slot machine
Jurassic Park Online Slot Original release date(s): NA: 2014; EU: 2014	Notes: Developed by Microgaming.; Published by Microgaming.; Based on the 1993 film Jurassic Park.
Jurassic Park Arcade Original release date(s): NA: 2015; EU: 2015	Release years by system: 2015—Arcade video game
Jurassic Park Arcade Original release date(s): NA: 2015; EU: 2015	Notes: Developed by Raw Thrills.; Published by Raw Thrills.; Based on the 1993 film Jurassic Park, the 1997 film The Lost World: Jurassic Park, and the 2001 film Jurassic Park III.
Jurassic World: The Game Original release date(s): NA: 2015; EU: 2015	Release years by system: 2015—iOS
Jurassic World: The Game Original release date(s): NA: 2015; EU: 2015	Notes: Developed by Ludia.; Published by Ludia.; Based on the 2015 film Jurassic World.
Jurassic World Online Slot Original release date(s): NA: 2015; EU: 2015	Release years by system: 2015—Slot machine
Jurassic World Online Slot Original release date(s): NA: 2015; EU: 2015	Notes: Developed by Microgaming.; Published by Microgaming.; Based on the 2015 film Jurassic World.
Lego Jurassic World Original release date(s): NA: 2015; EU: 2015	Release years by system: 2015—Android, iOS, Microsoft Windows, Nintendo 3DS, OS X, PlayStation 3, PlayStation 4, PlayStation Vita, Wii U, Xbox 360, Xbox One.
Lego Jurassic World Original release date(s): NA: 2015; EU: 2015	Notes: Developed by TT Fusion and TT Games.; Published by Warner Bros. Interactive Entertainment.; Based on the 1993 film Jurassic Park, the 1997 film The Lost World: Jurassic Park, the 2001 film Jurassic Park III, and the 2015 film Jurassic World.
VRSE Jurassic World Original release date(s): NA: 2017; EU: 2017	Release years by system: 2017—iOS, Android
VRSE Jurassic World Original release date(s): NA: 2017; EU: 2017	Notes: Developed by Skyrocket, LLC.; Published by Skyrocket, LLC.; Based on the 2015 film Jurassic World.
Jurassic World Facts Original release date(s): NA: 2018; EU: 2018	Release years by system: 2018—iOS, Android
Jurassic World Facts Original release date(s): NA: 2018; EU: 2018	Notes: Developed by Mattel, Inc.; Published by Mattel, Inc.; Based on the 1993 film Jurassic Park, the 1997 film The Lost World: Jurassic Park, the 2001 film Jurassic Park III, the 2015 film Jurassic World, and the 2018 film Jurassic World: Fallen Kingdom.
Dinosaur Stampede Original release date(s): NA: 2018; EU: 2018	Release years by system: 2018—Online
Dinosaur Stampede Original release date(s): NA: 2018; EU: 2018	Notes: Released as part of a Doritos promotional campaign.; Based on the 2018 film Jurassic World: Fallen Kingdom.; Official website
Jurassic World Alive Original release date(s): March 14, 2018	Release years by system: iOS, Android
Jurassic World Alive Original release date(s): March 14, 2018	Notes: Based on the 2015 film Jurassic World.
Jurassic World Evolution Original release date(s): June 12, 2018	Release years by system: Steam, Xbox Live, PlayStation Network
Jurassic World Evolution Original release date(s): June 12, 2018	Notes: Developed by Frontier Developments.; Published by Frontier Developments.; Based on the 2015 film Jurassic World.

=== Titles released in the 2020s ===
List of games
Game	Details
Jurassic World Evolution: Complete Edition November 3, 2020 – Nintendo Switch	Notes: Complete port of Jurassic World Evolution with all downloadable content (DLC) included; Developed and published by Frontier Developments; Based on the 2015 film Jurassic World; Claire's Sanctuary DLC based on the 2018 film Jurassic World: Fallen Kingdom; Return to Jurassic Park DLC based on the 1993 film Jurassic Park
Jurassic World Aftermath December 17, 2020 – Oculus Quest, Oculus Quest 2	Notes: Developed by Coatsink Software; Published by Oculus Studios; Set between the 2015 film Jurassic World and the 2018 film Jurassic World: Fallen Kingdom
Jurassic World Evolution 2 November 9, 2021 – Xbox One, PlayStation 4, Xbox Series X and Series S, PlayStation 5	Notes: Sequel to 2018 game Jurassic World Evolution; Developed by and published by Frontier Developments; 'Chaos Theory' mode features scenarios based on the Park and World trilogies; Pterosaurs and marine reptiles; Set between the 2018 Jurassic World: Fallen Kingdom and the 2022 film Jurassic World Dominion; Dominion Biosyn Expansion and Dominion Malta Expansion serve as sequels/retellings of Jurassic World Dominion
Jurassic World Evolution 3 October 25, 2025 – Xbox Series X and Series S, PlayStation 5	Notes: Sequel to 2021 game Jurassic World Evolution 2; Developed by and published by Frontier Developments; Male and juvenile prehistoric animals; Set after the 2022 film Jurassic World Dominion; Rebirth Expansion DLC acts as a prequel the 2025 film Jurassic World Rebirth
Jurassic World Evolution 2: Complete Edition July 30, 2026 – Nintendo Switch 2	Notes: Complete port of Jurassic World Evolution 2 with all downloadable content (DLC) included; Sequel to 2018 game Jurassic World Evolution; Developed by and published by Frontier Developments; 'Chaos Theory' mode features scenarios based on the Park and World trilogies; Pterosaurs and marine reptiles; Set between the 2018 Jurassic World: Fallen Kingdom and the 2022 film Jurassic World Dominion; Dominion Biosyn Expansion and Dominion Malta Expansion serve as sequels/retellings of Jurassic World Dominion

=== Cancelled titles ===
Game	Details
Jurassic Park: Survival Original release date(s): NA: 2001; EU: 2001	Release years by system: 2001—GameCube, Windows, PlayStation 2, Xbox
Jurassic Park: Survival Original release date(s): NA: 2001; EU: 2001	Notes: Developed by Savage Entertainment.; Published by Vivendi and Konami.; Inspired by 2001 film Jurassic Park III.
Jurassic World Survivor Original release date(s):	Release years by system: Steam, Xbox Live, PlayStation Network
Jurassic World Survivor Original release date(s):	Notes: Developed by Cryptic Studios, later Splash Damage; Published by Perfect World Entertainment.; Based on the 2015 film Jurassic World.

=== Related titles ===
Game	Details
Universal Studios Theme Parks Adventure Original release date(s): JP: 2001; NA: 2001; PAL: 2002	Release years by system: 2001—GameCube
Universal Studios Theme Parks Adventure Original release date(s): JP: 2001; NA: 2001; PAL: 2002	Notes: Developed by Nai'a Digital Works.; Published by Kemco.; Based on the 1993 film Jurassic Park.
Universal Movie Tycoon Original release date(s): JP: 2012; NA: 2012; PAL: 2012	Release years by system: 2012—iOS
Universal Movie Tycoon Original release date(s): JP: 2012; NA: 2012; PAL: 2012	Notes: Developed by Fuse Powered Inc.; Published by Fuse Powered Inc.; Based on the 1993 film Jurassic Park.
Lego Dimensions Original release date(s): NA: 2015; EU: 2015	Release years by system: 2015—PlayStation 3, PlayStation 4, Wii U, Xbox 360, Xbox One.
Lego Dimensions Original release date(s): NA: 2015; EU: 2015	Notes: Developed by TT Fusion and TT Games.; Published by Warner Bros. Interactive Entertainment.; Multi-company crossover title; Features characters and settings from the 2015 film Jurassic World.

== See also ==
- Jurassic Park (pinball)
