= Jurassic Park III: The DNA Factor =

2001 video game

- North American box art
- Developer: Konami Computer Entertainment Hawaii
- Publisher: Konami
- Series: Jurassic Park
- Platform: Game Boy Advance
- Release: NA: July 17, 2001; PAL: September 28, 2001; JP: November 1, 2001
- Genre: Side-scrolling puzzle
- Mode: Single player

Jurassic Park III: The DNA Factor is a side scrolling and puzzle game set in the Jurassic Park movie universe. It was developed by Konami Computer Entertainment Hawaii and published by Konami for the Game Boy Advance. It was coincided with the release of the film Jurassic Park III on July 17, 2001.

The two other games, Jurassic Park III: Park Builder and Jurassic Park III: Island Attack, are also released by Konami.

== Summary ==
A cargo plane flying over Isla Sorna is struck by lightning, and upon crashing, the dinosaur DNA it stored is spread across the island. The player then assumes the role of either Mark Hanson (a photographer) or Lori Torres (an ace pilot), and must wander around the island in a side-scrolling format, collecting DNA and avoiding dinosaurs. In each level, the player's character has the ability to switch between a background and a foreground pathway. Switching between the two pathways allows the player to access weapons and DNA samples, or to avoid oncoming dinosaurs. At the end of each level, the player will use the DNA that is collected in a short puzzle game, in order to create more dinosaurs. Completing this minigame will unlock more areas for the player to explore. At the end of the game, the military bombs the island, and the player escapes on a small plane, wondering if dinosaurs should really have a place in their world.

== Reception ==
Reception

Aggregate scores
Aggregator	Score
GameRankings	48.94%
Metacritic	44/100

Review scores
Publication	Score
AllGame	2/5
Game Informer	2.75/10
GameSpot	3.6/10
IGN	5/10
Nintendo Power	2.5/5

The game was met with mixed to negative reception upon release, as GameRankings gave it a score of 48.94%, while Metacritic gave it 44 out of 100. AllGame praised the game's graphics and sound effects, but criticized its "awkward" controls and wrote that the levels "are poorly designed and seemingly impossible to complete." AllGame also criticized the game's ability to switch between background and foreground pathways, writing "this just adds confusion, since swapping between roads can be tricky and the paths are oftentimes deceiving because of the limited screen size and resolution."

IGN praised its cutscenes, sound effects and music, but criticized its "sloppy game design," clumsy controls, and bad collision detection, as well as the game's background and foreground pathways: "Nothing casts a shadow, so you can't even tell if a DNA sample is hovering over the foreground path or lying on the ground on the background path."

GameSpot criticized the game for "disappointing" sound effects and music, and for sharing nothing in common with the film. GameSpot also criticized the game's background and foreground pathways, calling it "a confusing little gimmick that is mainly used to increase the amount of backtracking you'll have to do to collect the particles you need." In 2018, Zack Zwiezen of Kotaku ranked the game among the "worst" Jurassic Park games ever released, stating that it "looked and played awful when it was first released, and it hasn’t aged well at all."
