= Out-of-home entertainment =

Term in the amusement industry

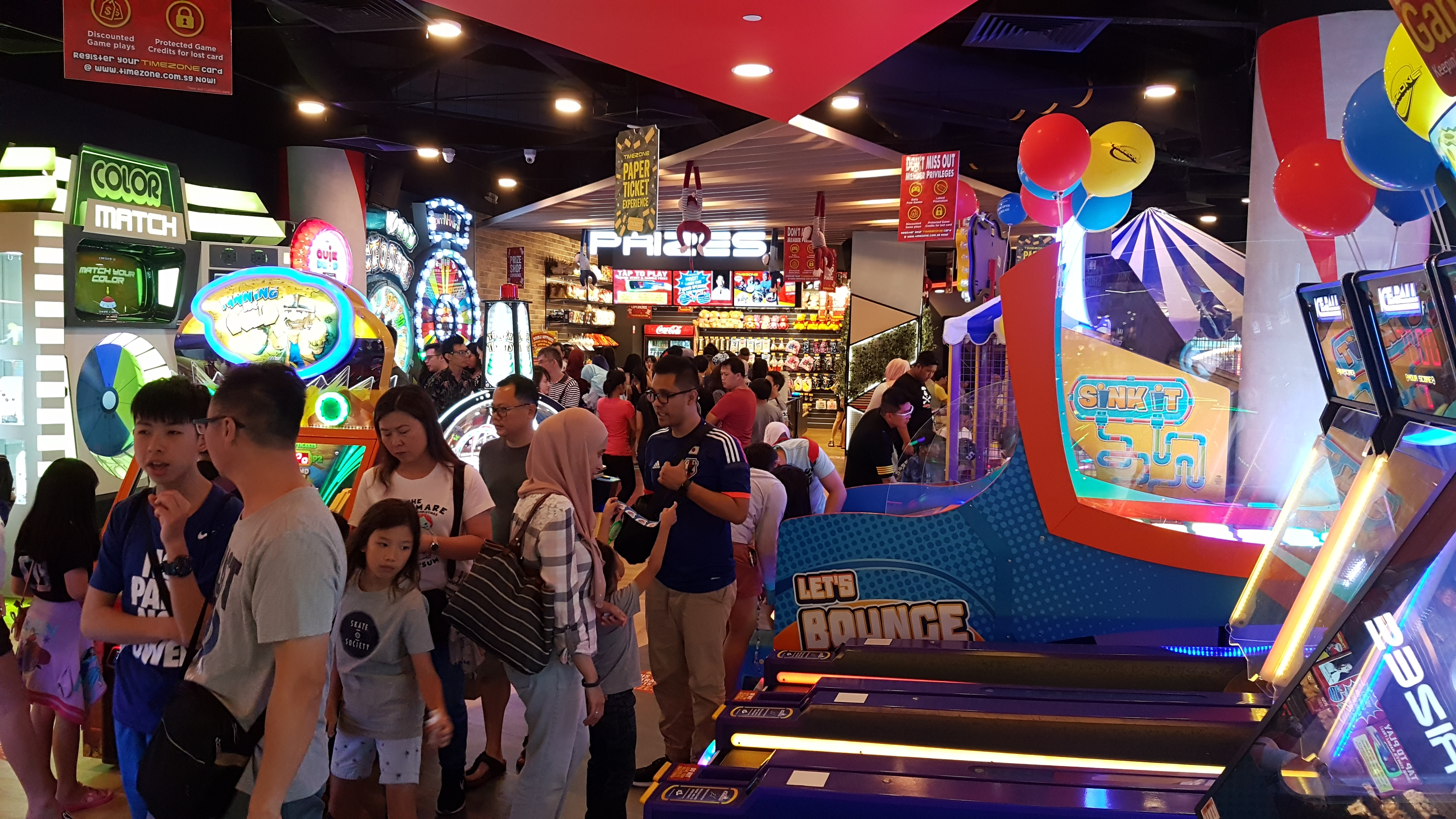
A modern-day family entertainment center or 'arcade' in Singapore.

Out-of-home entertainment (OOHE or OHE) is a term coined by the amusement industry to collectively refer to experiences at regional attractions like theme parks and waterparks with their thrill rides and slides, and smaller community-based entertainment venues such as family entertainment and cultural venues.

In the US alone, there are nearly 30,000 attractions—theme and amusement parks, attractions, water parks, family entertainment centers, zoos, aquariums, science centers, museums, and resorts, producing a total nationwide economic impact of $219 billion in 2011, according to leading international industry association, International Association of Amusement Parks and Attractions (IAAPA). The industry directly employs more than 1.3 million and indirectly generates 1 million jobs in the US, creating a total job impact of 2.3 million.

In recent years, the use of this term has gained acceptance with and been popularized by amusement industry players, industry associations, trade magazines and even securities analysts. This stems from the desire to distinguish between the social, competitive atmosphere and dedicated hardware found in location-based entertainment (LBE) venues from at-home consumer-game entertainment, mobile entertainment or even augmented reality (AR) and virtual reality (VR). The reality is that the lines are increasingly blurred with today's sophisticated consumers and emerging technologies.

This term is not to be confused with out-of-home media advertising as used by the advertising industry, although the convergence of digital out-of-home advertising and the digital out-of-home entertainment is producing innovations in retail and hospitality, steeped in fundamentals of social gaming experiences defined by the video amusement industry during the 70’s.

== Overview ==
Digital out-of-home entertainment (also DOE) is a sector that is understood by few but is a fast-growing technology sector with plenty of innovations transforming the sector. Its roots lie in the popularity of coin-operated arcade video games such as racing, fighting, Japanese imports, or pinball. During the mid-late 1990s and 2000s, with the advent of 3D consoles such as the PlayStation, audiences began to favor home gaming consoles over arcade machines. So while video amusement remains an integral part of the popular culture fabric today, its relevancy is diminished and even perceived as 'dead' partly due to the lack of coverage by consumer-game media even as the amusement industry transformed itself and research and development investments continue to pour into the sector, evolving and growing the out-of-home, pay-to-play experience.

In 2011, the non-profit Digital Out-of-Home Interactive Entertainment Network Association was established to help "define these amorphous groups that comprise this vibrant industry and illustrate how they all interact" with groups spanning from "family entertainment centers (FEC), location-based entertainment sites, visitor attractions, theme parks as well as retail, shopping malls and the hospitality sector – and not forgetting museums, heritage sites, schools".

== Forms of out-of-home entertainment ==
Cinema-going is the most common and widely popular form of out-of-home entertainment.

Other classic and expanded forms of OOHE making up the DOE sector include:

- Family entertainment centers (FECs)
- Location-based entertainment sites; FECs, bowling alleys, laser tags, batting cages, roller-skating rinks, mini-golf, ice rinks, etc.
- Theme and amusement parks
- VR arcades and VR parks
- Waterparks
- Trampoline parks
- Zoos
- Aquariums
- Science centers
- Museums
- Resorts
- Shopping malls
- Cinemas
- Sporting events
- Cultural activities; classical music, jazz, musical and non-musical plays, ballet, etc.

== Key actors in out-of-home entertainment ==
=== Family entertainment centers ===
Family entertainment centers are establishments that grew out of theme restaurants using a business model that combines food and entertainment. Popular examples of this model include Chuck E. Cheese, opened in 1977 and Dave & Buster's, opened in 1982. The success of these chains inspired other restaurants to implement entertainment attractions to increase their appeal to customers.

=== Arcade video game developers ===
In 1972, Atari created the first commercially successful video game Pong, marking the beginning of the coin-operated video game industry. In 1978, the first blockbuster arcade video game, Space Invaders was produced by Taito and ushered in the golden age of arcade video games. Other notable video game developers of this era include Namco, Nintendo, Konami, Capcom and Sega AM2.

More recently, video game publishers have also begun licensing existing intellectual property to experienced arcade game developers and manufacturers, an example being a collaboration between Ubisoft and LAI Games to produce Virtual Rabbids: The Big Ride, an attendant-free VR attraction based on the popular Rabbids franchise.

=== Redemption game manufacturers ===
A redemption game is an arcade amusement game involving skill that rewards the player (in gifts, tokens, etc.) proportionately to his or her score. One of the most popular redemption games, Skee Ball, has more than 100,000 Skee-Ball branded alley games in use worldwide by some estimates and continue to endure after more than a century. In 2016, BayTek Games bought the rights to Skee-Ball from Skee-Ball Amusement Games, Inc. Innovative Concepts in Entertainment (ICE), another reputable manufacturer, produced hit midway-style redemption games such as Down The Clown and Gold Fishin. Benchmark Games Int. has changed the game for players with Monsterdrop and Pop It & Win. LAI Games (formerly part of the Leisure and Allied Industries Group which founded Timezone) produced hit games such as Stacker and Speed of Light, the latter in which was embedded in popular culture with its appearance in Nickelodeon TV show Game Shakers.

Merchandizers also fall in the redemption game category. ELAUT is the best known for creating and popularising claw machines, with notable cranes like "E-Claw" and "Big One".

Other notable players include Coast to Coast Entertainment, Apple Industries, Coastal Amusements, Universal Space (UNIS), Adrenaline Amusements.

=== Simulation video game manufacturers ===
Another category of video amusement games are simulators. Raw Thrills, best known for developing arcade video games based on films such as Jurassic Park Arcade and AMC's The Walking Dead Arcade, is a common name found in medium and larger-sized FECs. Other established companies in this category are Triotech, maker of Typhoon - a 3D arcade machine with 2 seats and delivers up to 2G Forces of acceleration, and CJ 4DPLEX with their Mini Rider 3D - a 2-seat simulator on an electric motion base with a choice of several 3D movies.
