= Coinslot =

British trade magazine

Coinslot International is a UK trade magazine that caters for the 'pay-to-play' leisure sector, generally known as 'coin-op' before the widespread introduction of electronic means of payment. It is published weekly with a 'double' issue over the Christmas/New Year period.

Coinslot originated as a section of the World's Fair newspaper, published by the eponymous publishing house based in Oldham, Greater Manchester, before becoming a separate title. The magazine was first published in 1974.

== Issues of interest ==
Among the issues of interest to be found in Coinlsot include:

- Amusement with prize (AWPs), also known as fruit machines;
- Skill with prize (SWPs), also known as quiz machines (see itbox);
- Arcade games, including arcade video games;
- Vending;
- Redemption games: ticket prize games such as Skee-Ball;
- Children's rides;
- Simulators;
- Bingo halls;
- Casinos;
- Betting shops;
- Theme parks;
- Gambling regulation;
- Pubs;
- Members' clubs; and
- Seaside tourism.

== Ownership history ==
In 2000, the title was purchased by ATE Ltd, the organiser of the UK trade's major exhibition ATEI. In 1999 Coinslot, edited by Chris Murphy, successfully led the campaign against US-firm TOIC's proposals to purchase ATE from the industry's trade association BACTA (British Amusement Caterers Trade Association). Many in the industry believed that Coinslot played an instrumental part in blocking the sale of the exhibition company, which eventually purchased the newspaper. BACTA eventually sold ATE in June 2005 for £13.5m to Clarion Events, a deal that included Coinslot in the package. It was subsequently acquired by GB Media, which also publishes leading gaming titles iGaming Times and International Casino Review, for an undisclosed sum.
