= Bar-X =

Slot machines

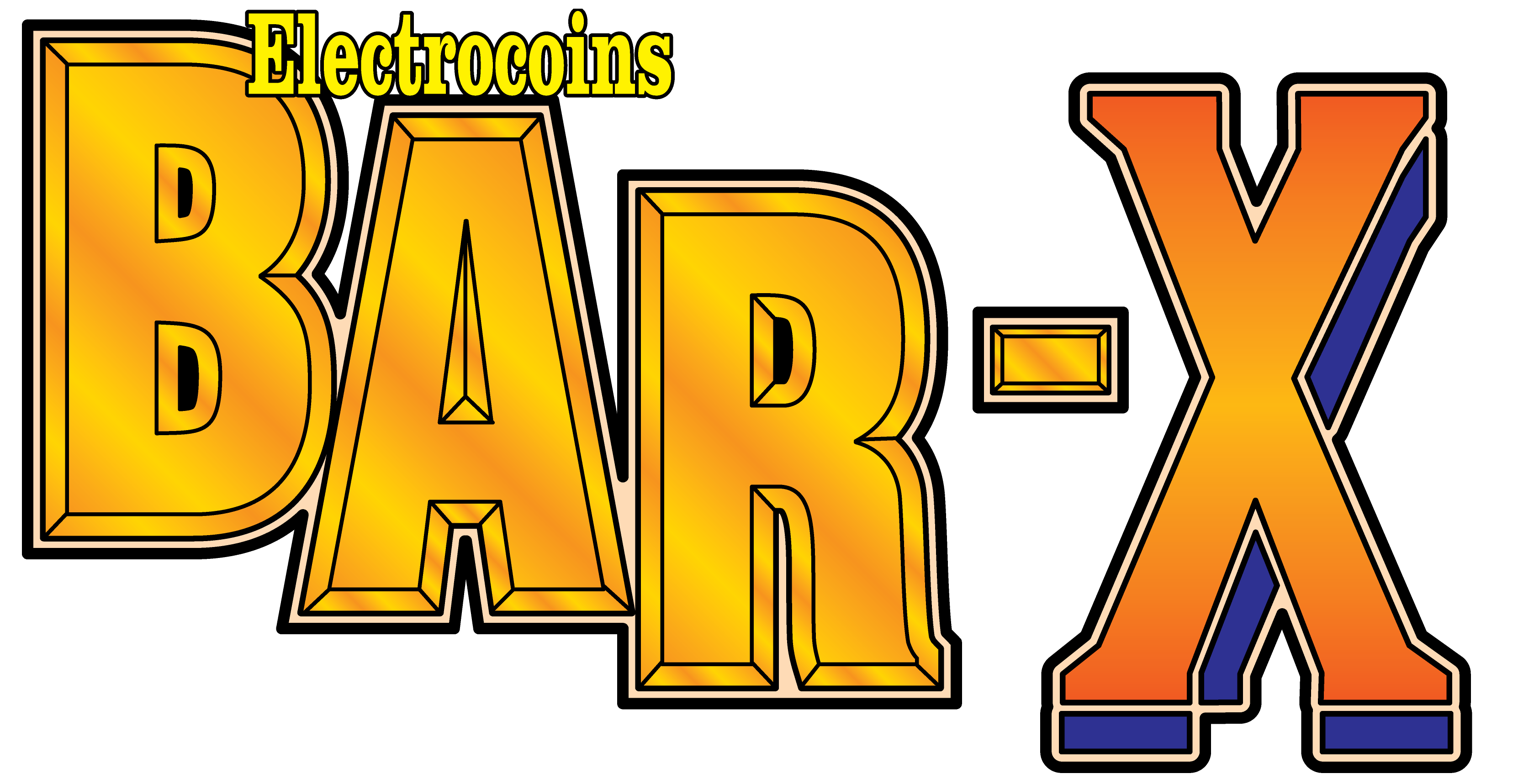
Bar-X branding

Electrocoin logo

Bar-X is an amusement with prize (AWP) model of slot machine created in 1981 by Electrocoin, a company founded in 1976.

== History ==
The idea behind its creation was to create a machine that was easily operable, delivered a good "hit" frequency, and allowed the player to feel that they were in control. The first rough concept was named OXO.

In 1982, full production began in collaboration with Japanese gaming company Universal Entertainment Corporation. Early versions were manufactured in Japan and released under the OXO Americana Cabinet and Super OXO brands.

Electrocoin produced an initial run of one-hundred Bar-X machines at their factory in Ferry Road, Cardiff, Wales. These units had a newer style of payout technology and a redesigned cabinet.

By 1983, Bar-X had become established as "an essential part of the furniture" in UK amusement arcades. That same year Big 7 was added to the range, since then the Bar-X family has been a permanent fixture in almost every major gaming outlet across the UK. Several top gaming industry figures have described it as the best machine of all time, and a "benchmark for many AWPs on the market".

As a result of the increase in production, in 1989 Electrocoin moved to larger premises in Cardiff and divided the business into two component parts – namely Electrocoin Aftersales and Service Ltd to manage demand and service and support which remains based in Cardiff and Electrocoin Sales Ltd to manage production and sales which is now based in Wembley, North London.

By early 1993, more than 20,000 Bar-X units had been sold.

== Legacy ==
Electrocoin, primarily under the Bar-X brand, continues to develop gaming machines and electronic games.

In 2016, marking its 35th anniversary, the company released the Bar-X Deluxe app for iPhone and iPad, maintaining the classic format in a digital version. A second app, Bar-X Card Crazy, later expanded its mobile offerings, aiming to replicate traditional fruit machine gameplay on mobile devices.
