= Target: Terror =

2004 video game

- North American Wii box art
- Developers: Raw Thrills; Leviathan Games (Wii)
- Publishers: NA: Raw Thrills (Arcade); JP: Taito (Arcade); Konami Digital Entertainment (Wii)
- Designer: Eugene Jarvis
- Platforms: Arcade, Wii
- Release: Arcade: NA: May 2004; JP: 2006; Wii: NA: April 22, 2008
- Genre: Light gun shooter
- Mode: Up to 2 players simultaneously
- Arcade system: PC with NVidia Graphics, custom I/O

Target: Terror (known as Target: Force in Japan) is a shooter arcade game developed and published in 2004 by Raw Thrills, and designed by Eugene Jarvis. The game involves shooting terrorists attacking various places in the United States, including Denver Airport, the Golden Gate Bridge and Los Alamos National Laboratory.

There is a special edition called Target: Terror Gold which awards medals to the player as a bonus and, also has hidden minigames that can be unlocked by damaging certain parts of the environment such as windows or oil drums.

== Gameplay ==
The game challenges players to fight against terrorist attacks on the Golden Gate Bridge, the Los Alamos nuclear power plant, and the Denver International Airport using optical guns. The final mission is to prevent a hijacked airliner from being crashed into the White House. The Gold version contains the same levels as the original version but includes several bonus rooms. One such room has the player shooting turkeys with bombs strapped to them that are flung by terrorists in a field. Another bonus room is similar to Missile Command and has players intercepting ICBMs with flares. Players are awarded combat medals after each successfully completed mission. The game features two modes: 2-player simultaneous play on one gun or "Justice Mode". Justice Mode can play both guns on one player. The characters of any kind are portrayed by real live/live action people.

== Plot ==
After dispatching and killing all terrorists, helping all officials (and keeps all the officials alive, along with the innocents) and saving all innocents in all these areas, the player(s) is (are) sent to a Boeing 747 that has been hijacked. The player(s) must fight their way to the cockpit in order to stop the terrorists from performing a suicide attack on the White House. If the player(s) succeeds to killing all the terrorists, helping all officials while successfully keeping them all alive, saving all innocents, and stops the White House suicide attack, the president then says that he and the whole world thanks the player for their courage and bravery of stopping the terrorists, calls the player(s) a hero, and also says "It's because of heroes like yourselves, that this country is a safe place for democracy and the American way of life". On the Wii version the speech abruptly cuts to static. However in the original arcade version the speech is interrupted by terrorists, who capture the president and shoot the player(s). Regardless of platform, the ending is followed by a “To Be Continued” screen, but no continuation or sequel was ever created.

== Development ==
Target: Terror was the first arcade game developed by Raw Thrills. Designed by Eugene Jarvis, the game was inspired by the paranoia in the United States after the September 11 attacks. Raw Thrills felt that such an "outrageous", controversial premise would give them publicity. However, they avoided using ethnic stereotypes.

The game's characters were animated with motion capture; Raw Thrills thought it looked more realistic than 3D models. A nonviolent "paintball" option was included for family audiences. The final level, in which the player must stop a hijacked Boeing 747 from crashing into the White House, was inspired by United Airlines Flight 93 and the speculation over its intended target. According to Jarvis, the scene caused Walmart stores to ban Target: Terror from their arcades. If the player successfully completes the mission the president thanks the player for their actions, but is then kidnapped by terrorists, which is followed by a to be continued screen, however a sequel was never made.

Target: Terror was unveiled at the January 2004 Amusement Trades Exhibition International show in London, along with other Raw Thrills game The Fast and the Furious.

The game was published in Japan by Taito.

=== Wii port ===
Target: Terror was ported to the Wii by Konami in 2008. It supports the Wii Zapper peripheral.

The Wii version received generally negative reviews from critics, receiving an average score of 37.26% based on 19 reviews on the review aggregator GameRankings, and an average score of 33 out of 100 based on 19 reviews on Metacritic.

Jeff Gerstmann of Giant Bomb criticized the difficulty of the game, noting "Someone, somewhere is able to play the arcade version of this on one quarter. If you encounter him, do not take this gentleman up on his offer to give you a ride home! It will only end in tears, several years of forced servitude, and a shallow grave near mile marker 117."

In 2009, IGN gave the game "Worst Visuals" award on the Wii, describing them as "so bad it made Aerosmith's Revolution X look good".

The title featured in 19th place in a 2022 Retro Gamer list of the Top 25 Light Gun Games, with critic Ashley Day describing it as a "game defined by surprising moments" and praising its live-action visuals as "better than anything from the Nineties, with tons of unique animations".
