= VRS =

VRS may refer to:

== Government and military ==
- Vojska Republike Srpske, i.e. the Bosnian Serb army, active 1992–2006
- Military Revolutionary Council (Russian: Военно-революционный Совет), a Ukrainian anarchist organisation, active 1919–1920

== Transport ==
- Verkehrsverbund Rhein-Sieg, public transport in the Cologne/Bonn region of Germany
- Vortex ring state, a helicopter flight condition
- Skoda vRS car models

== Technology ==
- an alternate abbreviation for versus, Vrs.
- Video relay service, telecommunication service for the hard of hearing
- Virtual Reference Station, using real-time kinematic GPS positioning

== See also ==
- VR (disambiguation)
