= Dirty Drivin' =

2011 video game

- Dirty Drivin' logo
- Developer(s): Specular Interactive
- Publisher(s): Raw Thrills
- Platform(s): Arcade
- Release: 2011
- Genre(s): Racing

Dirty Drivin' is an arcade racing game developed by Specular Interactive and released by Raw Thrills in 2011. The game was also released in the People's Republic of China, which was unveiled at the GTI Asia China Expo. The game's main track played throughout the menu is More Human than Human by White Zombie.

== Gameplay ==
In Dirty Drivin', players engage in vehicular combat, and gear-shaped power-ups are available throughout the track, which can be used to destroy enemy vehicles by pulling a skull-shaped crank, which do not return to the race after getting destroyed; exceptions to this are the player and their rival, a single AI opponent, as well as other players when playing in multiplayer. Players can also jerk the wheel to hit opponents, and whenever an opponent gets destroyed, a photo of the opponent appears at the bottom of the screen, as well as a taunt. Points that the player earns increases the amount of weapons available to the player on the "Jerk-O-Meter". Also scattered throughout the track are crates, which can increase the player's points, double dirty on the power-ups, or give the player a free race.

After every race, a slot machine-style game is played called "Yank the Crank", where the player is to pull the skull crank, in an attempt to earn items that can be used in the next race (but will be lost if the player leaves the game), as well as a free race, though players can also get a "You Lose", which not only leaves them empty handed, but also logs them out of the game.

The game has a password system, where players enter a PIN to save their progress.

== Development ==
Development for Dirty Drivin' started in 2009, and was originally designed by Specular Interactive as "H2Overdrive on wheels", and the prototype cabinet for the game was a modified H2Overdrive unit with pedals and a slot machine crank. On the cabinet, gauges depict the situation that the player is in (though the developers originally intended to use automobile gauges).
