= ATEI =

ATEI is a four-letter acronym and can refer to:

- Amusement Trades Exhibition International, the major UK trade show for the coin-op and amusements trade.
- Technological Educational Institute (A.T.E.I., 2001~present) of tertiary education in Greece - (Greek: Ανώτατο Τεχνολογικὀ Εκπαιδευτικὀ Ιδρύμα)
