= Itbox =

Networked gambling games terminal

itbox is a networked gambling games terminal which is found in thousands of pubs, leisure centres and amusement arcades in the United Kingdom. Classified as a "skill with prize" (SWP) machine, each itbox terminal typically includes 25 different games. Each game costs 50p or £1 to play and lasts between 10 seconds and several minutes. From most of these games it is possible to win modest cash prizes. Although strictly the name 'itbox' refers only to Leisure Link-made terminals, the name is often casually applied as a genericized trademark to other SWP terminals such as Paragon SWP, Gamesnet, ind:e and Fatbox.

== Games ==
The games on itbox are largely question-and-answer based where the player will need to answer a varying number of questions (often from a range of subject categories) correctly before he or she can opt to collect a small prize (normally £1) or gamble for a chance to win a larger prize by answering further questions.

=== Question-and-answer based ===
- Pub Quiz – the simplest itbox game. It consists of a total of six rounds of 4 or 5 questions each, with prizes ranging from £1 (usually on completion of the third round, but occasionally after the second round) to a £10 jackpot. The player starts with one "try again" and a "change category" option, and can gain bonuses such as "pass" or "cheat", which automatically reveals the correct answer during a bonus round. Occasionally a cash prize can also be won in this way. Pub Quiz differs from most Itbox quiz games in that once a prize is attained, it cannot be lost and does therefore not need to be "collected". Pub Quiz also often features comedy answers which will be obviously wrong, especially in the first round.
- Bullseye – This game is based on an old television programme of the same name. It became, and remains, one of the more popular Question and Answer games on the itbox. Players must skillfully throw darts into a dart board to achieve points towards their target score. If this score is achieved, then the player is entered into the prize round, where they are able to throw darts into a "prize" board to gain cash prizes.
- Every Loser Wins – Has a similar format to Pub Quiz, but requiring players to answer questions wrongly rather than correctly. Players start with a "change category" option but no "try agains", though an "extra life" option is available during the bonus round, along with "change category" and, occasionally, a cash prize. Unusually, the 2/3 odds given on each question means players can make good progress simply by guessing their way through the game.
- Who Wants To Be A Millionaire? – Based on the popular television programme, Millionaire enables gamers to sit with Chris Tarrant in order to win £20. The completion of the Fastest Finger First round opens up bonuses such as 'Ask the Audience' and '50:50', which can be invaluable in helping the player reach the payout questions. A recent 2006 edition has been launched, with less time available to answer individual questions but improved odds of gaining Fastest Finger bonuses, as well as more video footage of Chris Tarrant.
- Monopoly – The latest "Hot Property" edition of this game requires players to attain a points target (usually between 5000 and 6000 points) and then play and endgame to win money. Points are accumulated by landing on properties, getting bonuses from "Chance" and "Community Chest" cards, and playing mini-games. Once a property has been landed on, a house is won (unlike in previous versions of Monopoly where a full set needed to be owned for houses to be available) and its points value increases to its base value plus its rent value with one house (hotels give a similar bonus). Collecting all 4 stations awards a cashpot prize. The endgame requires a player to choose three random properties from those accumulated during the main game. The game then offers a prize based on those properties, or the player can pick one and win its cash equivalent instead.
- Deal or No Deal – Based on the television programme presented by Noel Edmonds, the player must choose boxes and answer trivia questions to accumulate enough points to play a final cash round. The points target can range from 10000 to 90000, but is usually between 30000 and 60000, depending on how likely the Itbox is to pay out. The final cash round has no questions and requires to play, essentially, a very small-scale version of 'Deal or No Deal' with prizes ranging from 10p to a £20 jackpot. In some pubs the game has proved so popular that the minimum play is £1 and not 50p.
- Deal or No Deal – No Questions – A new version of the game for Itbox. Presented by Noel Edmonds, the player is presented with a succession of box values, and must light up all the boxes by accepting the values that appear and discarding the ones that don't within a given time limit. There are also bonus boxes that give more time or an extra box value. If all the boxes are lit, the player progresses to the same final cash round as in the original Deal or No Deal.
- Take It or Leave It – Based on the Challenge game show presented by Richard Arnold, launched in October 2007, in which the player must answer 10 questions to get to a final cash round. The questions each come with an answer, and the player must "take it" (if they believe it to be correct) or "leave it" (if it is incorrect). In between each question is a round which decides the total prize value. Players are presented with a selection of 20 "vaults" containing values from 10p to £3, and two "booby traps" which end the game. Players choose two vaults, then must decide which one to take based on the amount revealed in the first vault. The total prize accumulates through 10 such rounds. In the final round, players are presented with 6 "vaults", each containing different shares of the total prize fund, which are then scrambled and hidden. Players must answer a question correctly to choose a vault. They can then collect the share of the prize fund revealed, or reject it in an attempt to answer a further question correctly and open a vault containing a larger share. Any incorrect answer given in either stage ends the game with no prize.
- 1 vs 100 – Based on the 'National Lottery' programme of the same name, this game involves 100 "contestants" which players need to eliminate by answering questions. Each correct answer eliminates a number of "contestants", usually between 3 and 10. Players have two "dodge" options, similar to a pass, and one "double" option, which doubles the number of "contestants" eliminated by one correct answer. Once all the "contestants" have been eliminated, the player progresses to a cash round and can win a prize from 25p to £20 by eliminating 9 of the 10 prizes offered.
- The Million Pound Drop – Based on the Channel 4 game show presented by Davina McCall, this game requires players to answer eight rounds of questions to win cash prizes of up to £10. At the start of the game, the player is given twenty money 'bundles' of 50,000 points; each is worth 50p of the maximum £10 prize available. The player must select a category from a choice of two at the start of each round, and then answer up to four questions on that topic. Each question has four possible answers, represented by four trapdoors. The player must place their money bundles on the answer they believe to be correct, within the time limit. Any bundles not placed after this time are lost from the game. The answer is then revealed and any bundles placed on wrong answers are removed. Play continues in this way until the player either answers the final question of the eighth round correctly, thus winning the cash value of the bundles they have remaining, or loses all their bundles and the game ends.
- The Colour of Money – Based on the ITV gameshow of the same name presented by Chris Tarrant, this game features 20 different coloured 'cash machines', each holding a value between 1,000 and 20,000 points. Players pick a card at the start of the game to determine their points target, and then must reach that target by selecting machines. Some machines contain up to four questions which must be answered correctly to continue. For every incorrect answer given to a question, a 'Try Again' is lost. The machine will then begin counting upwards in increments of 1,000 points. The player must stop the count before the machine 'busts' and they lose all the points for that go. If they stop the machine before this happens, the points go towards their target. If the player stops the machine at the exact total the machine contains, the player receives a bonus 'Try Again'. If they reach their points target, the player progresses to the cash round and carries through any remaining 'Try Agains'. The cash round follows an identical format, but with cash values in each machine, ranging from 10p to £20. The maximum cash win of the game is capped at £20, despite the total value of the machines in the cash round being significantly higher. The game ends when the player gives an incorrect answer with no 'Try Agains' remaining. If this happens in the cash round, the player wins the prize money they have amassed so far.
- High Stakes – Based on the ITV gameshow of the same name hosted by Jeremy Kyle, this game requires the player to progress, row-by-row, across the 'High Stakes' grid, by avoiding traps which will end the game. On each of the six rows of the grid are seven consecutive numbers (e.g. 27 to 33), and each row contains an increasing number of traps, starting with one trap on the first row, up to six traps on the sixth and final row. Increasing cash prizes, up to £10, are awarded the further the player progresses, usually from the fourth row onwards. To avoid each trap, the player is given a clue that points to the trap number on that row. For example, if the clue was 'AVOID the number of passenger capsules on the London Eye.', the player must select any other number on the row EXCEPT 32, since that is the number of passenger capsules on the London Eye. Once the player has successfully avoided each trap, they are asked between 1 and 4 trivia questions. They must AVOID the correct answer to every question they are asked (by selecting a wrong answer from the options available). Along the way, several 'safe' numbers (i.e. numbers that are revealed NOT to be traps) reveal tokens that can be collected in order to win an extra life. A life is lost if the player selects the CORRECT answer to a question. The game ends when a player does this with no lives remaining.
- In the Grid – Based on In the Grid, a television programme presented by Les Dennis. Players attempt to reach a target score that is displayed before the game begins. The player then starts selecting squares on a 4x4 grid, each with a 3-answer multiple-choice question behind it. If the question is answered correctly, the colour of the square is revealed and points are added or taken away accordingly. Gold squares (Cash squares) increase the player's score by the amount shown, Green squares (Bonus squares) increase the player's score by the percentage shown, Purple squares (Steal squares) allow the player to steal a percentage of points from the Steal Pot (starting at 1000 points, but increasing when the player picks a Penalty square), Red squares (Penalty squares) decrease the player's score by the percentage shown and adds it to the Steal Pot and the one Black square (Bankrupt square) reduces the player's score to zero and must start over. The player is also given 2 Reveals to use at any time. These can be used in 2 ways. The first is to reveal the colour of an unrevealed square to determine if it will be good or bad, and the second is used to reveal the correct answer to the question presented to the player. The player is also given 1 Try Again, should they answer any question incorrectly. After a few squares have been played, the player is presented with a New Grid option. If the grid is looking less favourable to the player, they can press the New Grid button and a new grid of squares will be presented to the player and randomised, allowing them to carry on playing, however Reveals and Try Agains are not restored. If the score quota is reached, the player moves on to the MegaGrid round. The player is presented with a 5x5 grid and is told how many Gold and Black squares are in it. As long as the player keeps picking Gold squares, they move up a money tree starting at 25p and ending at a jackpot of £40. A Black square does not wipe the player's winnings out, but does end the game.

=== Skill / card games ===
Some games on itbox do not involve questions at all; examples of these are:

- Word Soup – (a new name for Word Up) Here the computer generates a "random" matrix of letters with different point values based upon the machine's 'willingness' to pay out, players must form English words from adjoining letters in order to reach a predetermined prize target which ranges from 450 to 2100 points.
- Triple Towers – The solitaire card game generically known as tri peaks, in which a random sequence of playing cards are dealt face down in a tri-pyramid pattern. The player is then dealt 24 cards with which he must clear all the pyramid cards within a set time by creating sequential runs (in this game Ace is both high and low). Competing pub/bar game manufacturers call their versions of this very popular game Tri-Towers and Merry Maidens, among others.
- Trickshot Pool – A computerised simulation of 8-ball pool. Players must pot a pre-determined number of their own colour balls (between 4–8). If successful the player has a chance to win a cash prize by completing a trickshot by potting an awkwardly positioned black ball determined by the computer. (Standard 8-ball pool rules apply with the exception that potting the 8ball off the break is considered a foul.) Recent modifications appear to have reintroduced more skill into this title by tweaking the CPU player's shot choices.
- Crystal Maze – A game where the player must use various skills to win crystals and proceed to the 'Dome', in the same way that contestants did on television show of the same name. Presented by Richard O'Brien, the player must torpedo ships, connect pipes and re-arrange words amongst mini-games to gain access to the final round where the amount of crystals collected translates as time. To win the prize the user must collect gold tickets whilst missing silver, which are deducted from the final total. (This title has been largely superseded on later itbox releases.)
- itbox Soccer – A test of knowledge based on the sport of football, Itbox Soccer is a word based game where players must fill in the blanks to complete the name of a player or other soccer-related term.

The amount of money won is determined by the number of points the player accumulates by successfully answering questions and filling in the missing letters.

- Cluedo – A game where the player has a choice of rolls on a dice to choose from. The aim is to find out the suspect, the weapon and the room the murder took place. If this is done, the player wins £20. You can also win money for landing on all 6 suspects for £5 or the amount of rooms entered- The amount of rooms before money can be collected varies, it can be the 2nd to the 5th room entered. You must be in the correct room and guess the murderer and weapon correctly to win £20.
- Skill Ball Bingo – A game where players get a standard English Bingo card, whilst 105 bingo balls jump around on the top part of the screen. when a Ball drops into a hole at the bottom of the screen, it appears stationary and the player must press the accept button if the ball is on the card or reject if it isn't. Also in the machine, there are 5 star balls, these activate the Jackpot collection if all 5 are collected. there is also a skull ball which must be rejected otherwise the player loses time and any star balls collected and finally a "?" ball, which gives the player added time. If a player accepts a ball not on the card, the skull ball or rejects a ball on the card,"?" ball or star ball, the player gets a time penalty of 5 seconds. To win on the game, players must get a line. the amount that a player can win is on screen for each prize level, but as time decreases, the amount drops until the game is up or they win that prize. a person can win for this is £1-5 for a single line collected,£6-15 for 2 lines or £10-30 for a full house. If the jackpot mode is activated and a player gets all the star balls and a full house, they win the jackpot of £50(£100 on some machines). The odds of getting a line is roughly 5–1. Every 100th game or so an extra £5 ball is added. If this is potted, then the person automatically wins £5 into the collect fund.

Past games that are no longer available, except on older machines, include The Two Towers, and Dungeons & Dragons.

=== Tournament games ===
In early 2006 a new style of game was introduced to itbox terminals. These tournament games pit players playing on different terminals around the country against each other for larger cash prizes than the stand-alone games. The national high score tables are reportedly updated in real time.

== Prizes ==
In accordance with gambling legislation the standard payout percentage of itboxes is 30%, although operators can elect to set this at 40% or 50%. Many of the terminals are fixed minimum payout as with all fruit machines. Each game has a prize structure which varies according to whether that game has recently paid out more than it should have according to the fixed payout percentage. Most games have a nominal jackpot of £20 although attaining this requires considerable skill from the player and cooperation from the software. Occasionally the operator underestimates the dedication of quiz machine players, or the software on a particular game is defective. When this happens, fast-acting players can empty machines of the jackpot with minimum difficulty.

== Sale to Danoptra Gaming Group ==
In June 2008, the Inspired Gaming Group led by Norman Crowley (owners of all the original Leisure Link machines) sold all itbox terminals based in pubs to the Danoptra Gaming Group
