= Quiz machine =

Commercial coin-operated video quiz game

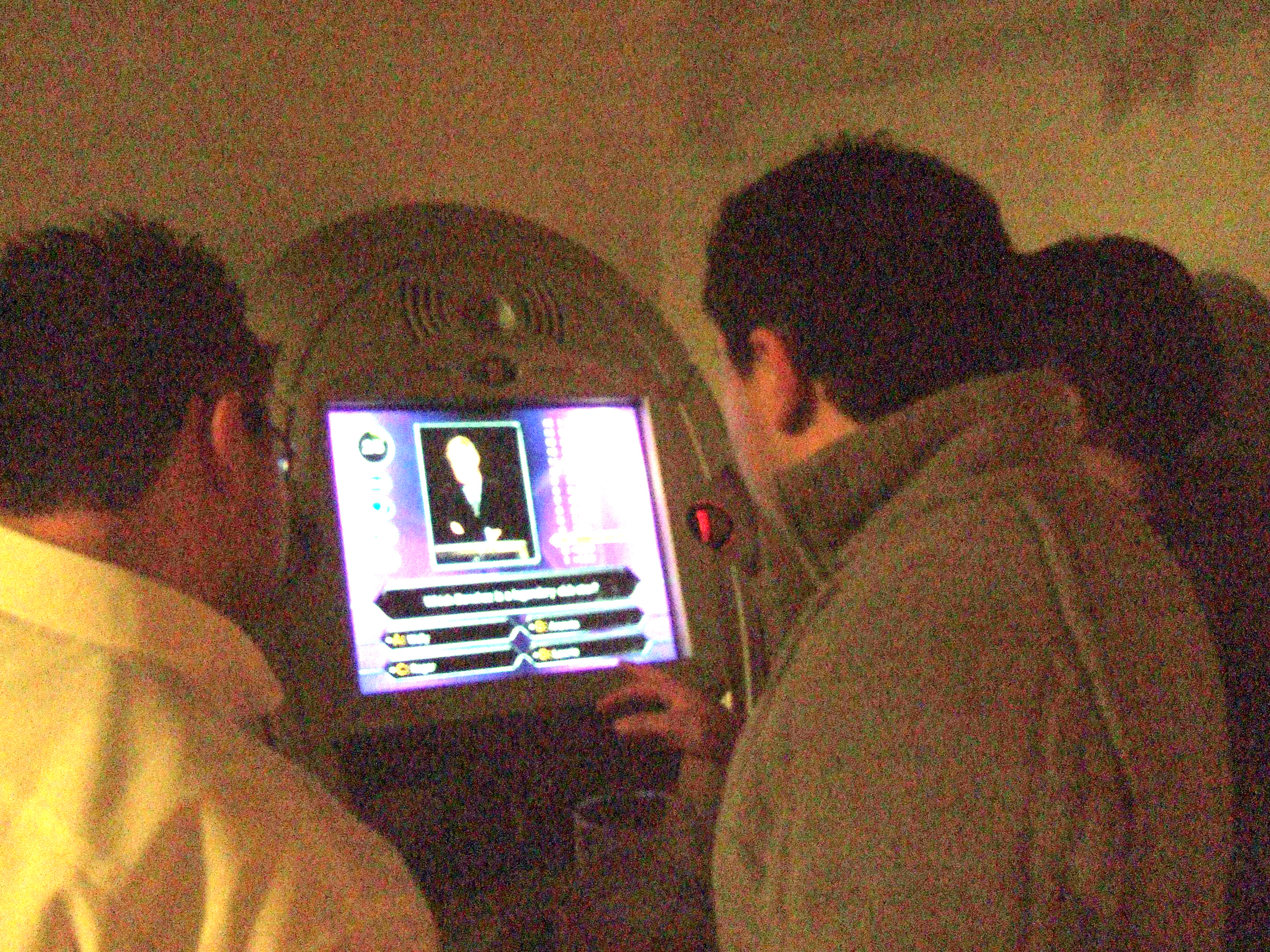
A 2007–2010 JPM Who Wants to Be a Millionaire? quiz machine

Quiz machine is a term used in the UK for commercial coin-operated video quiz games that offer cash prizes for winning performances. It is a type of slot machine in which the player must answer questions in addition to, or instead of, matching symbols. These machines are usually found sited in pubs, bars, and other places of entertainment. The term quiz machine is often used interchangeably with the trade term SWP (skill with prize) although not all SWP games are quiz based.

== History ==
The quiz machine first appeared on the scene in the UK in 1985. The first such machine was called Quizmaster which was made by the Cardiff based now defunct Coinmaster Ltd. This was rapidly followed by quiz machines from other manufacturers.

Over the following years quiz machines/SWP's became a regular feature of the British pub. Leading SWP manufacturers of the 1980s and 1990s were: Coinmaster, JPM, Barcrest, Bell-Fruit, Maygay and Ace-Coin. The themes of many SWP games were (and still are) based on popular TV quiz shows, board games or other aspects of popular culture.

Initially quiz machines were 20p play, offering a £10 maximum prize per play. This was increased to £12 in 1988 and £20 around 1991. Appearing in 1994 JPM's Monopoly SWP was the first 50p play machine. It was also the first machine to use touch screen technology instead of buttons.

In the late 1990s, a few quiz machines/SWPs offered £40 jackpots. Although many new quiz machines during this period actually offered lower jackpot prizes such as £5, and had gameplays and payout structures that seemed designed to frustrate professional players. In 2000, the quiz machine market reached new highs in player participation with the arrival of the highly popular Who Wants to Be a Millionaire? quiz machine.

== Professional quiz machine players ==
The arrival on the scene in 1985 of SWP/quiz machines quickly led to the existence of a cohort of professional and semi-professional players. These were people who became highly skilled on particular games, being able to learn and memorise nearly entire question sets for a particular machine. They could then make substantial incomes from touring many different quiz machine locations and extracting money from the particular types of machine in which they were skilled.

Over the years, the size of quiz machine question sets has steadily increased, with the extensive use of "spoiler" questions to make large multiple wins difficult or impossible. Since the mid-1990s, gameplay formats have also become a lot less "Pro"-friendly. Today it is still possible for very skilled players to make worthwhile money playing SWPs, but it is much harder than in the past.

== The quiz machine/SWP today ==
A fundamental change occurred in the nature of SWPs in the early 2000s. Single games in stand-alone cabinets were discontinued and replaced by multi-game terminals. Some of these can run a choice of up to 25–30 different games on the same machine. Some are also able to provide services other than gaming. These units can be managed and updated remotely through an ISDN or ADSL network connection.

Leading multigame terminals and their manufacturers at present are:

- itbox made by Maygay Ltd and originally used exclusively by Leisure Link, all machines are now owned by GamesTec.
- FatBox Slim made by Fat Spanner
- Ind:e and Indego (game machine) made by GamesMedia/Channel1
- Gamesnet made by GamesTec

Today most SWP/quiz machine games offer a nominal £20 jackpot for 50p play and a few offer £40 for £1 play. But on present day games the payout is carefully controlled and manipulated by the software. Payout levels are set at lower levels than previously.

== Legal grey areas ==
An SWP machine must offer the chance to win the jackpot on every game; however, the level of skill involved to do that is set so high as to be virtually impossible. Manufacturers have, at times, set the skill level so high that it is physically impossible to achieve this. Because there is no governing body for skill games, the only time this is brought into question is when the gaming authorities are alerted and take court action to prove or disprove that this is the case. In practice, this is very rare, as the gaming authorities have no jurisdiction over skill machines, and the only way for a prosecution to succeed is to prove that the game in question breaks the law in some way.

This can be done by proving that the machine differs from the legal definition of a skill machine which says that a player must be allowed to win prizes by skill alone. If there is an element of luck in the game it is automatically classed as a game of chance and is legally bound by the gambling commission legislation.

Many manufacturers push this boundary to the limit and sometimes into the grey area of legal definitions beyond.

The stake/prize level of a skill machine is also a grey area, as there is no legal limit on either, although most manufacturers abide by a gentleman's agreement with BACTA (a trade organisation) to limit both amounts to levels that are unlikely to attract the attention of legislators. Skill machines can legally be sited anywhere and played by anyone of any age, although there seems to be a lot of confusion about this, with some people assuming age limits and site restrictions must exist because of the similarity between these machines and AWP ("amusement with prize") machines, such as one-armed bandits.

== See also ==
- Slot machine
