= Skill with prize =

Gaming machine with awards based on player's skill

A "Skill with Prize" (SWP) machine is a gaming device that awards payouts based on a combination of the player's skill and elements of chance. This category of gaming machine is distinct from "Amusement with Prize" (AWP) machines, which are interactive, but primarily rely on chance rather than skill to determine the game's outcome. The degree to which skill and chance influence the outcome can differ significantly among SWP machines and may be modified by the operator to adjust the balance between the two.

== Examples ==
"Stacker" is a common free-standing merchandiser SWP machine. In the United Kingdom, the most common class of SWP machines are quiz machines, on such platforms as the itbox, and are widely found in public houses. Indeed, "quiz machine" is often used interchangeably with "SWP" for such countertop machines, though not all games on these devices are quiz-based: other games include The Crystal Maze, based on The Crystal Maze, and Word Up.

Claw cranes, often containing plush toys, a common type of merchandiser

Another SWP machine class is free-standing machines, generally found in video arcades. These are frequently merchandisers – devices containing prizes – most commonly claw cranes (also known as claw machines), and more recently Stacker. Other examples include Barber Cut and Barber Cut Lite by Namco Bandai Games. There are also a number of SWP games specific to Japan, such as Move Sector and Ring Magician. Another class is redemption games, which rather than containing prizes, instead dispense tickets that can be redeemed for prizes. Some machines, such as Flamin' Finger and Stacker, can be configured as either merchandisers or redemption games.

== Economics ==
SWP machines are generally intended to be profitable for the operator in their own right, rather than as loss leaders; sample economics are given in reference. For example, Barber Cut is advertised as "more addicting than any other prize redemption game, and those repeat plays will land right in your cash box!"

A problem that some vendors identify is that players may be "skeptical of any chance at winning", since many SWP games can be and are rigged to only provide payout a fraction of the time; thus evidence that suggests that a prize has been won "convinces players that it is possible to win."

While SWP machines are generally not intended to be continuously winnable by skilled players – otherwise such a player could continue to play and win and cause losses to the operator – it is sometimes possible that player skill, or using the machine in a way not anticipated by the manufacturer, can result in the game actually losing money for the operator. This may result in service updates by the manufacturer to close the exploit. Other methods to minimize losses are discussed at claw cranes.

== Regulation ==
SWP machines are in a legal gray area in the United States, due to containing elements of skill and of chance, particularly since payout percentages can to a large extent be set by the operator – such setting leads to machines being described as rigged. They are generally regulated separately from games of pure chance such as slot machines; see claw vending machine: legality for statutes about claw machines. (They are legal and regulated in the United Kingdom, for example).

Claims of being largely or entirely skill-based can expose the operator to accusations of unfair practices; thus some lawyers advise operators not to advertise the machines as being skill-based.

As of 1 November 2010, all UK SWP machines must adhere to strict guidelines set by the BACTA (British Amusement Catering Trade Association) & the Gambling Commission. These guidelines state that there must be no element of chance within the game that can affect the outcome. There are also limits set on the level of skill needed to play, for example, there must be a minimum amount of time for a player to react to the game. This ensures that manufacturers & operators cannot be accused of setting physically impossible skill levels. Quiz machines are the easiest SWP machine type to bring to compliance with the law, as the spoiler questions that they hand out to try to enforce their percentages are still answerable if you know them.

== See also ==
- Amusement with prize
