= In the Grid =

Television series

- Presented by: Les Dennis
- Theme music composer: Marc Sylvan
- Country of origin: United Kingdom
- Original language: English
- No. of series: 1
- No. of episodes: 70

Production
- Running time: 30 minutes (inc. adverts)
- Production company: Initial West

Original release
- Network: Five
- Release: 30 October 2006 – 2 February 2007

In the Grid is a British game show that aired on Five from 30 October 2006 to 2 February 2007, hosted by Les Dennis.

== Format ==
Hidden somewhere in this grid, a thousand pounds in cold hard cash, but if you won't give enough without a fight. To win big tonight, one of our contestants must hold their nerves and avoid the traps and find the money that waits In the Grid.

— Les Dennis' opening monologue of the show

=== Round 1 - The Grid ===
The reigning champion gets to pick from a 3x3 board (from A1 to C3), each square hiding a name. The selected square reveals the name of the champion's new opponent. If there is no reigning champion (only the case where the previous champion has won five games and has to "retire"), the selection is made randomly by the Grid. The first person selected is treated as the "reigning champion", and the second person selected is treated as the "new contestant" for the purposes of game play: this is elaborated on later in this section.

The main game board has sixteen squares in a 4x4 layout (from A1 to D4). Behind each square is a different colour, and neither player (nor the host or audience) knows the location of which colours are where.

The colours are:

- Gold (Cash): If chosen, the player receives a set amount of money.
- Green (Bonus): If chosen, the player's money is increased by a set percentage.
- Purple (Steal): If chosen, the player steals a set percentage of their opponent's money.
- Red (Penalty): If chosen, the player's money is reduced by a set percentage.
- Black (Bankrupt): If chosen, the player loses all or his/her money.

The number of times that each colour occurs in the Grid varies between episodes. Typically, it will contain 4-7 Cash squares, 1-4 Bonus squares, 2-4 Steal squares, 4-6 Penalty squares and there is always 1 Bankrupt square, without exception.

Both players begin the game with £1,000 and two "reveals". If played, a reveal will allow a player to see the colour of a square, but not its value. The player is not obliged to play a square if they reveal it, however their opponent may choose to use the square for themselves if they believe it contains something good.

The new contestant begins the selection and chooses a maximum of 8 squares, with the reigning champion selecting a maximum of 7 squares (sometimes the game may finish early when the outcome has been finalised), and the selection alternates between each player. The final square is never played. This uneven distribution of selections may at first seem like a disadvantage to the casual observer: however on witnessing game play it can often be in a players favour to select less squares, and also not to have the last pick of squares (especially if you need a large amount of money on your last go to win, or if you are in the lead and have to select a square you know will reduce your total). This is not always the case though, as each game differs wildly.

Whoever gets the most money before the last square goes through to the Mega Grid. The loser doesn't keep the money they have accumulated to that point.

=== Round 2 - The Mega Grid ===
In this end game, the winning player is offered the chance to win tens of thousands of pounds in prize money. Usually, the top prize in this round is between £15,000 and £30,000, although it reached £50,000 on one occasion (25 December 2006). To win, they must choose squares on a 5x5 grid labelled A1 to E5. The grid contains around 20 to 23 gold squares, and 2 to 5 bankrupt squares.

The first move is compulsory. The player must choose a gold square to increase their winnings. Hitting a bankrupt causes the player to lose all their winnings from that episode.

Thereafter, the moves are optional. The Grid will make an offer to the player to carry on for one more turn (up to a maximum of five turns). If the player agrees to carry on, they must choose another gold square to increase their winnings. Again, if they hit a bankrupt, they lose everything. The offers tend to increase exponentially, to encourage the player to take risks. After the first move, the player can take their current winnings at any point.

The winning player returns to play on the next episode. However once a contestant has played the Mega Grid 5 times, they have to "retire".

So far, five contestants have gone all the way to the end on the Mega Grid and four of these have been successful.

== Viewer's Competition ==
After the main game has finished, the board changes to a nine square 3x3 formation, with values ranging from either £500-£3,000, £500-£5,000, £800-£7,000 or £1,000-£10,000. The day's champion picks a square and the amount that they reveal goes to one of the viewers at home who entered.

== Popularity ==
It was hoped the show would become a surprise success, following in the wake of another game show Deal or No Deal, but it failed to do so and was cancelled after 14 weeks.

According to a press release of the pub gaming machine Itbox, which had included a version of In the Grid in their software, the program would return for a second series in January 2008. However, this never happened, as no contestant calls were put out, and the program's official website was later shut down.
