= Bull's-Eye Ball =

Skee ball game by Hasbro

Bull's-Eye Ball (called Hot Shot in Germany) is a skee ball game developed by Hasbro (through its subsidiary Tiger Electronics). Small steel balls must be bounced via an elastic diaphragm into a narrow inlet in order to win points. The entire device is approximately the size of four soda cans. It consists of 3 different games: 30 Second Blitz, where the goal is to get as many points as possible within 30 seconds; 25 Point Rush, where the player must get 25 points as fast as possible; and Bull's-Eye Ace, where the player tries to get a large percentage of bull's-eyes.

There are several editions of Bulls-Eye Ball, including Bulls-Eye Ball 2 (with a new addition, Target Master), Bulls-Eye Ball Platinum, and a baseball edition, Bulls-Eye Ball Baseball.
