= Money booth =

Used for entertainment

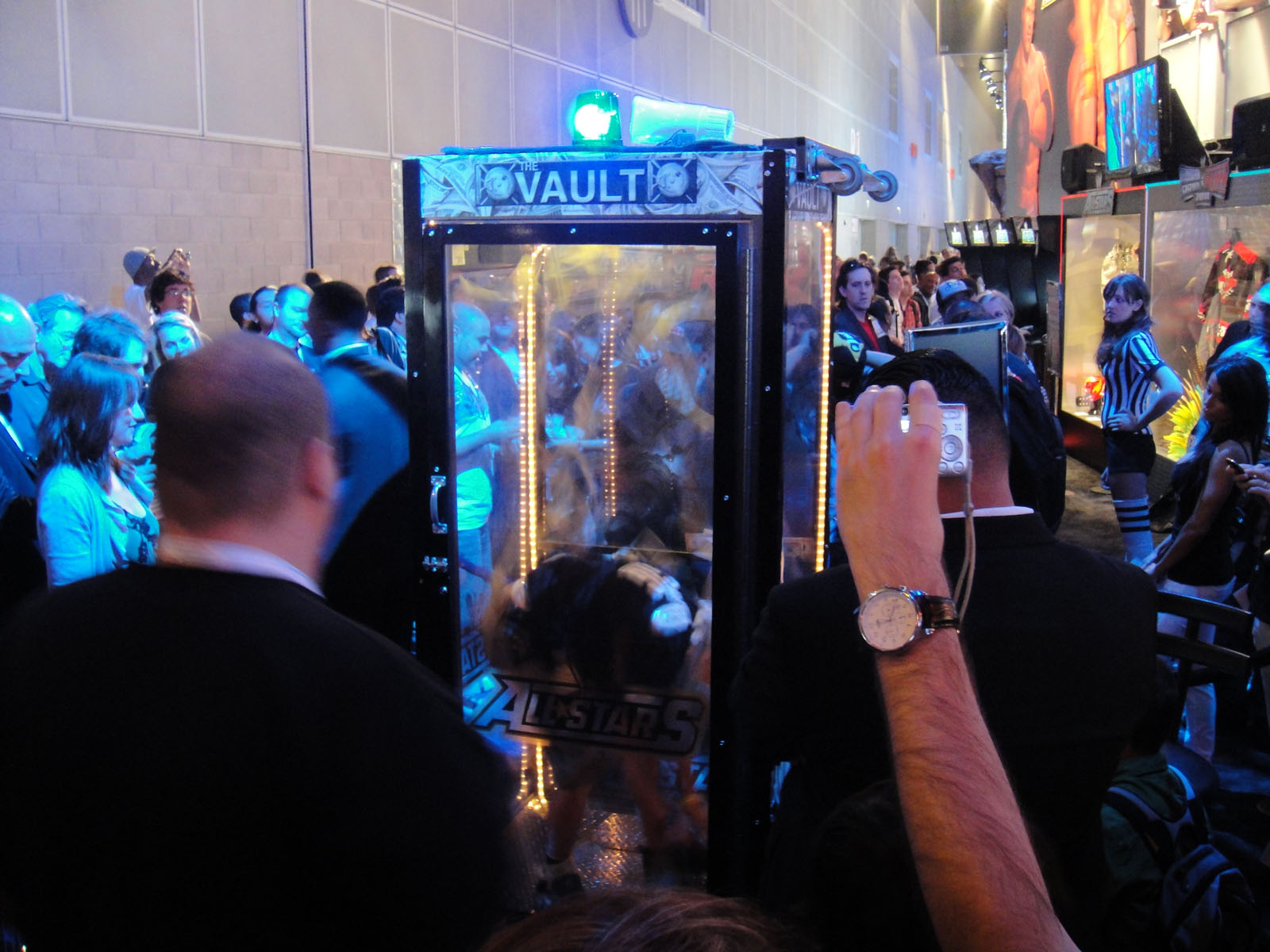
A money booth at a trade show

A money booth, also known as cash booth, money machine, and cash cube, is an arcade game and merchandiser in the form of an enclosure in which paper money (or, alternatively, coupons, tickets, or gift certificates) are blown through the air. A participant inside the booth then has to grab as many banknotes as possible in a limited amount of time.

Casino promoter John Romero is credited with developing the first money booth, called the "$100,000 Shower of Money," for a 1963 event at the Sahara Las Vegas. After its success in Las Vegas, Romero offered the game for use on several NBC game shows including Concentration.

Money booths are rented from event management and party supply companies and often used as attractions at trade fairs, promotional events and fundraisers.
