= H2Overdrive =

2009 video game

- H2Overdrive logo
- Developer: Specular Interactive
- Publisher: Raw Thrills
- Platform: Arcade
- Release: May 2009
- Genre: Racing

H2Overdrive is a powerboat arcade racing game developed by Specular Interactive and released in 2009 by Raw Thrills. It is considered a spiritual successor to 1999's Hydro Thunder. The game was also released in China by UNIS.

== Gameplay ==
Screenshot of the game

Players race using powerboats with various levels of difficulty against other boats, as well as seven other players on nearby cabinets. During the races, players can run into crates that give them power-ups that can range from speed boosts to MegaHull and HullCrusher abilities, which can be used to destroy opposing boats. On the cabinet, a throttle is used to move the boat, instead of pedals. On the throttle, a red button is used to boost the boat. Unlike in Hydro Thunder, boats can now perform stunts, as well as various acrobatic maneuvers.

The game has a password entry system, which features a number keypad to store game data as the player progresses through the game, and achievements that the player unlocks are available, and players can increase their rank and level until it reaches the highest possible rank/level. The game is played on a 42" LCD screen.

== Development ==
The game was developed by Specular Interactive which consisted of former Midway San Diego employees, along with Hydro Thunder creator Steve Ranck. It was unveiled by Raw Thrills at the Amusement Trades Exhibition International in January 2009. The game is considered a spiritual successor to Hydro Thunder, and was originally named Hydro Thunder 2 before being renamed to its current name; Midway had been intending on creating a sequel to the game, but the plan would later be scrapped – Midway would also declare bankruptcy the same year H2Overdrive released. An unrelated game by the same name was developed for the PlayStation 2 by Crave Entertainment in 2003, though the game was never released. A similar game titled Hydro Thunder Hurricane would however be released for the Xbox 360 console via Xbox Live Arcade.

== See also ==
- Hydro Thunder Hurricane
