= Arcade Matt =

American YouTuber (born 1987)

- Born: Matthew Magnone; April 11, 1987 (age 39); Ambridge, Pennsylvania, U.S.
- Occupation: YouTuber

YouTube information
- Channel: Arcade Matt
- Genre: Arcade game
- Subscribers: 1.83 million
- Views: 504 million
- Last updated: June 15, 2025

Matt Magnone (born April 11, 1987), better known as Arcade Matt, is an American YouTuber, known for his videos related to arcade and carnival games. In December 2018, the name of the channel was changed from Matt3756 to its current iteration.

== Biography ==
Magnone was born on April 11, 1987, in Ambridge, Pennsylvania. He began uploading YouTube videos focused on claw machines in 2009.

== Mount Shabang ==
During the 2024 IAAPA show, LAI Games revealed Mount Shabang in partnership with Magnone, featuring his likeness and sound bites. The game was released the following March.
