= J. Dickinson Este =

Jonathan Dickinson Este, was born on March 12, 1887, in Philadelphia, Pennsylvania, and died on September 25, 1961, in Fairfield, Connecticut. A graduate of Princeton University, he served with distinction as an aviator in World War I. He shot down four enemy aircraft, won the Distinguished Service Cross, and commanded the 13th Aero Squadron for the last few weeks of the war. He left the service as a captain.

Unaccountably, the inventor of Skee Ball lived a life of apparent wealth, living in fashionable areas of Long Island and Connecticut, and also at the Carlyle Hotel in Manhattan. He and his wife, the former Lydia Richmond Taber, traveled extensively.
