= Amusement arcade =

Venue where people play arcade games

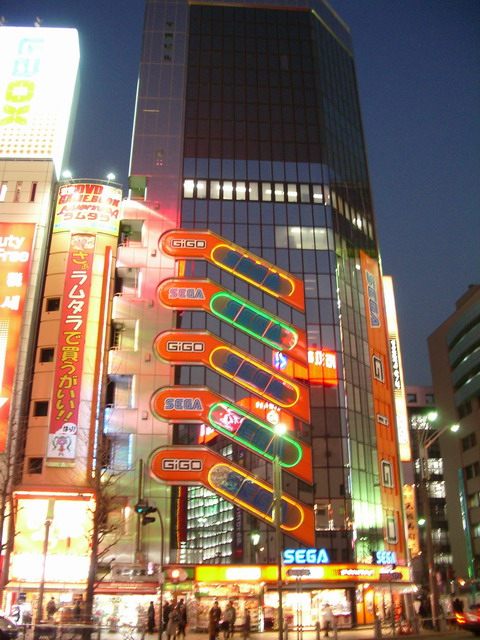
GiGO, a former large 6 floor Sega game center on Chuo Dori, in front of the LAOX Aso-Bit-City in Akihabara, Tokyo, Japan

An arcade, also known as amusements, a video arcade, a penny arcade (an older term), or more formally known as an amusement arcade, is a venue where people play arcade games. These include arcade video games, pinball machines, electro-mechanical games, redemption games, merchandisers (such as claw machines), or coin-operated billiards or air hockey tables. In some countries, some types of arcades are also legally permitted to provide gambling machines such as slot machines or pachinko machines. Games are usually housed in cabinets.

Video games were introduced in amusement arcades in the late 1970s and were most popular during the golden age of arcade video games, the early 1980s.

== History ==
=== Penny arcade ===
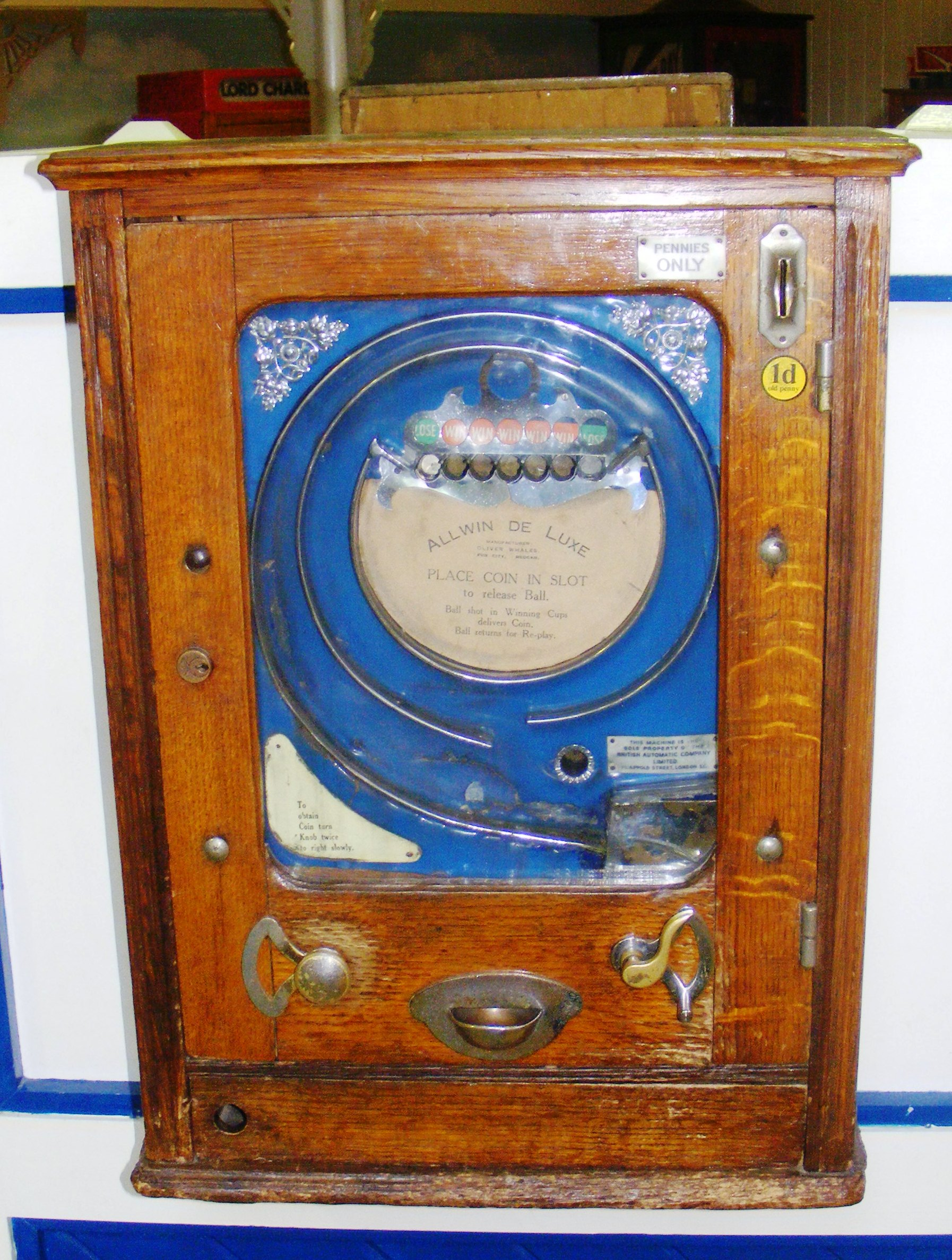
Early machine at Wookey Hole Caves

A penny arcade can be any type of venue for coin-operated devices, usually for entertainment. The term came into use about 1905–1910. The name derives from the penny, once a staple coin for the machines. The machines used included:

- bagatelles, a game with elements of billiards and non-electrical pinball
- early forms of non-electrical pinball machines
- fortune-telling machinery
- slot machines
- coin-operated Amberolas
- peep show machines (in the original, non-pornographic, usage of the term), which allowed the viewer to see various objects and pictures
- Mutoscopes
- love tester machines
- coin-operated shooter games and gun games

Between the 1940s and 1960s, mechanical arcade games evolved into electro-mechanical games (EM games). Popular examples of EM games in the 1960s included shooters such as Sega's Periscope (1965) and Rifleman (1967), and racing games such as Kasco's Indy 500 (1968) and Chicago Coin's Speedway (1969). Penny arcades later led to the creation of video arcades in the 1970s.

=== 1970s and 1980s ===
Video game arcades began to gain momentum in the late 1970s with games such as Space Invaders (1978) and Galaxian (1979) and became widespread in 1980 with Pac-Man, Centipede and others. The central processing unit in these games allowed for more complexity than earlier discrete-circuitry games such as Atari's Pong (1972).

During the late 1970s video-arcade game technology had become sophisticated enough to offer good-quality graphics and sounds, but it remained fairly basic (realistic images and full motion video were not yet available, and only a few games used spoken voice) and so the success of a game had to rely on simple and fun gameplay. This emphasis on the gameplay explains why many of these games continue to be enjoyed today, despite the progress made by modern computing technology.

The golden age of arcade video games in the 1980s became a peak era of video arcade game popularity, innovation, and earnings. Color arcade games became more prevalent and video arcades themselves started appearing outside their traditional bowling-alley and bar locales. Designers experimented with a wide variety of game genres, while developers still had to work within strict limits of available processor-power and memory. The era saw the rapid spread of video arcades across North America, Western Europe and Japan. The number of video-game arcades in North America, for example, more than doubled between 1980 and 1982, reaching a peak of 13,000 video game arcades across the region (compared to 4,000 in 1998). Beginning with Space Invaders, video arcade games also started to appear in supermarkets, restaurants, liquor stores, filling stations and many other retail establishments looking for extra income. This boom came to an end in the mid-1980s, in what has been referred to as "the great coin-op video crash of 1983".

On November 30, 1982, Jerry Parker, the Mayor of Ottumwa, Iowa, declared his city the "Video Game Capital of the World". This initiative resulted in many firsts in video game history. Playing a central role in arcade history, Ottumwa saw the birth of the Twin Galaxies Intergalactic Scoreboard and the U.S. National Video Game Team, two organizations that still exist today. Other firsts that happened in the Video Game Capital of the World included:

- the first video-game-themed parade (Jan. 8, 1983)
- the first video game world championship (Jan. 8–9, 1983)
- the first study of the brain waves of video-game champions (July 12, 1983)
- the first billion-point video-game performance (Jan. 16, 1984)
- the first official day to honor a video-game player (Jan. 28, 1984)

High game-turnover in Japanese arcades required quick game-design, leading to the adoption of standardized systems like JAMMA, Neo Geo and CPS-2. These systems essentially provided arcade-only consoles where the video game ROM could be swapped easily to replace a game. This allowed easier development and replacement of games, but it also discouraged the hardware innovation necessary to stay ahead of the technology curve.

Most US arcades did not see the intended benefit of this practice since distributors refused to release arcade games as simply a ROM, preferring to sell the entire ROM, console, and sometimes the cabinet as a package. In fact, several arcade systems such as Sega's NAOMI board are arcade versions of home systems.

Other problems were that many arcades focused on quantity more than quality, and that games showed a rising difficulty curve, making them increasingly inaccessible to casual players and more expensive for the skilled players.

=== 1990s ===
The rise of the fighting game genre with games such as Street Fighter II and Mortal Kombat, combined with the release of popular sports titles such as NBA Jam and NFL Blitz, led to a brief resurgence in the popularity of video arcades, with new locations opening in shopping malls and strip malls throughout the country in the early 90s.

The arcade industry entered a major slump in mid-1994. Arcade attendance and per-visit spending, though not as poor as during the 1983 crash, declined to the point where several of the largest arcade chains either were put up for sale or declared bankruptcy, while many large arcade machine manufacturers likewise moved to get out of the business. In the second quarter of 1996, video game factories reported 90,000 arcade cabinets sold, as compared to 150,000 cabinets sold in 1990.

The main reason for the slump was increasing competition from console ports. During the 1980s it typically took several years for an arcade game to be released on a home console, and the port usually differed greatly from the arcade version; during the mid-1990s it became common for a game publisher to release a highly accurate port of an arcade game that had yet to peak in popularity, thus severely cutting into arcade owners' profits.

=== 2000s and beyond ===
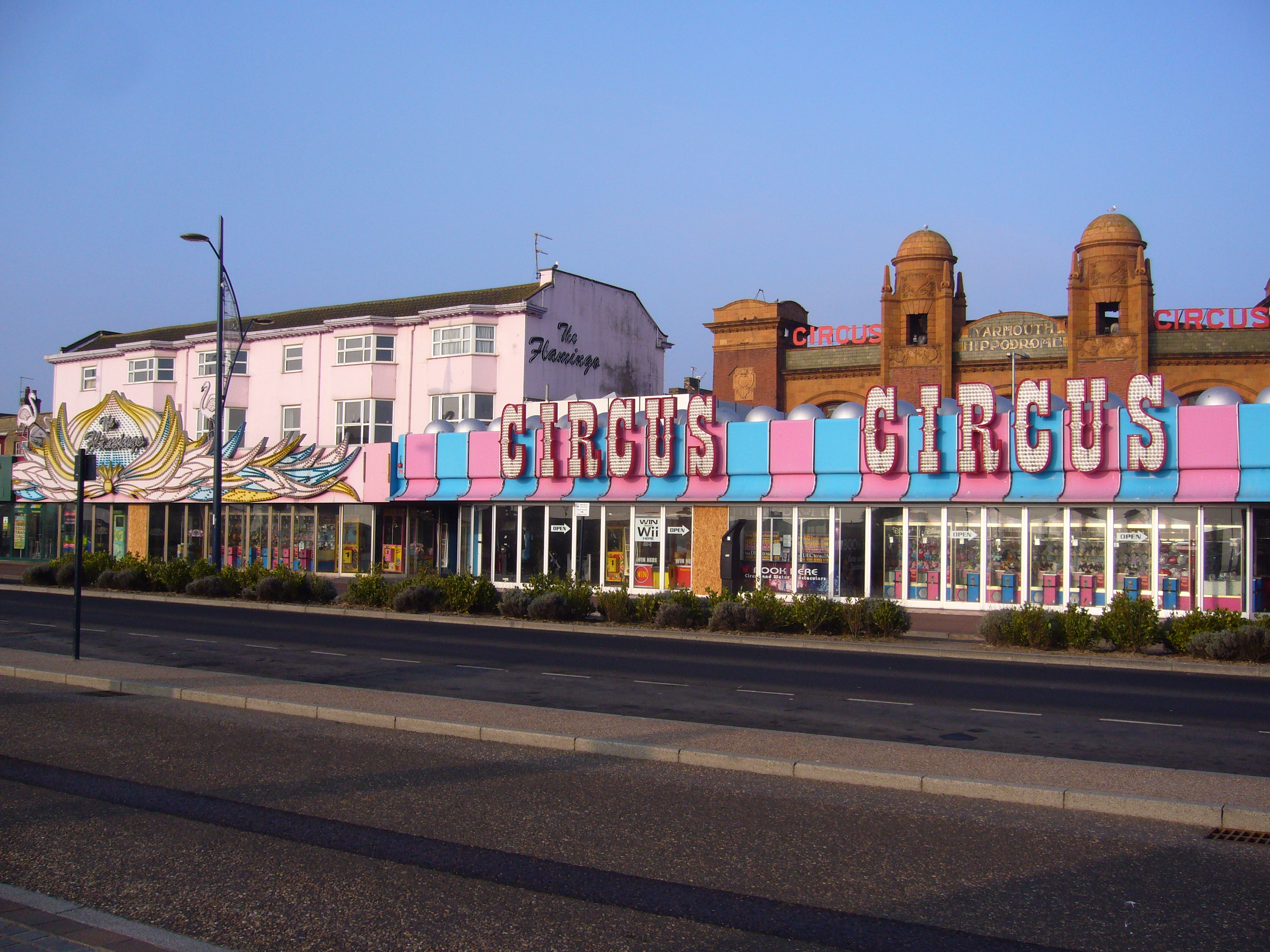
Two traditional amusement arcades on Great Yarmouth sea front, 2011

In the late 1990s, a bar opened in the new Crown Casino complex in Melbourne, Australia named Barcode. Barcode was a 'games bar' with the latest arcade games, the classics, pool tables, air hockey and pinball machines which players could play while consuming alcohol. The bar was very popular with other bars later opening in the early 2000s in King Street alongside the strip clubs and at the shopping centre Melbourne Central. A Barcode opened in Times Square, New York in May 2000 and was very popular, with the launch featuring on an episode of TV series Sex and the City. Barcode Times Square closed in March 2003. Barcode Crown Casino closed in 2006, followed later by King Street and Melbourne Central.

In the mid-2000s, Madrid businessman Enrique Martínez updated the video arcade for the new generation by creating a "hybrid movie theater with...fog, black light, flashing green lasers, high-definition digital projectors, vibrating seats, game pads and dozens of 17-inch screens attached to individual chairs." At the Yelmo Cineplex in Spain, $390,000 was spent refitting a theater into a "high-tech video gaming hall seating about 50 people." In Germany, the CinemaxX movie theater company was in 2007 also considering this approach. It conducted a four-month trial with video games to test the level of demand for video gaming in a theater setting.

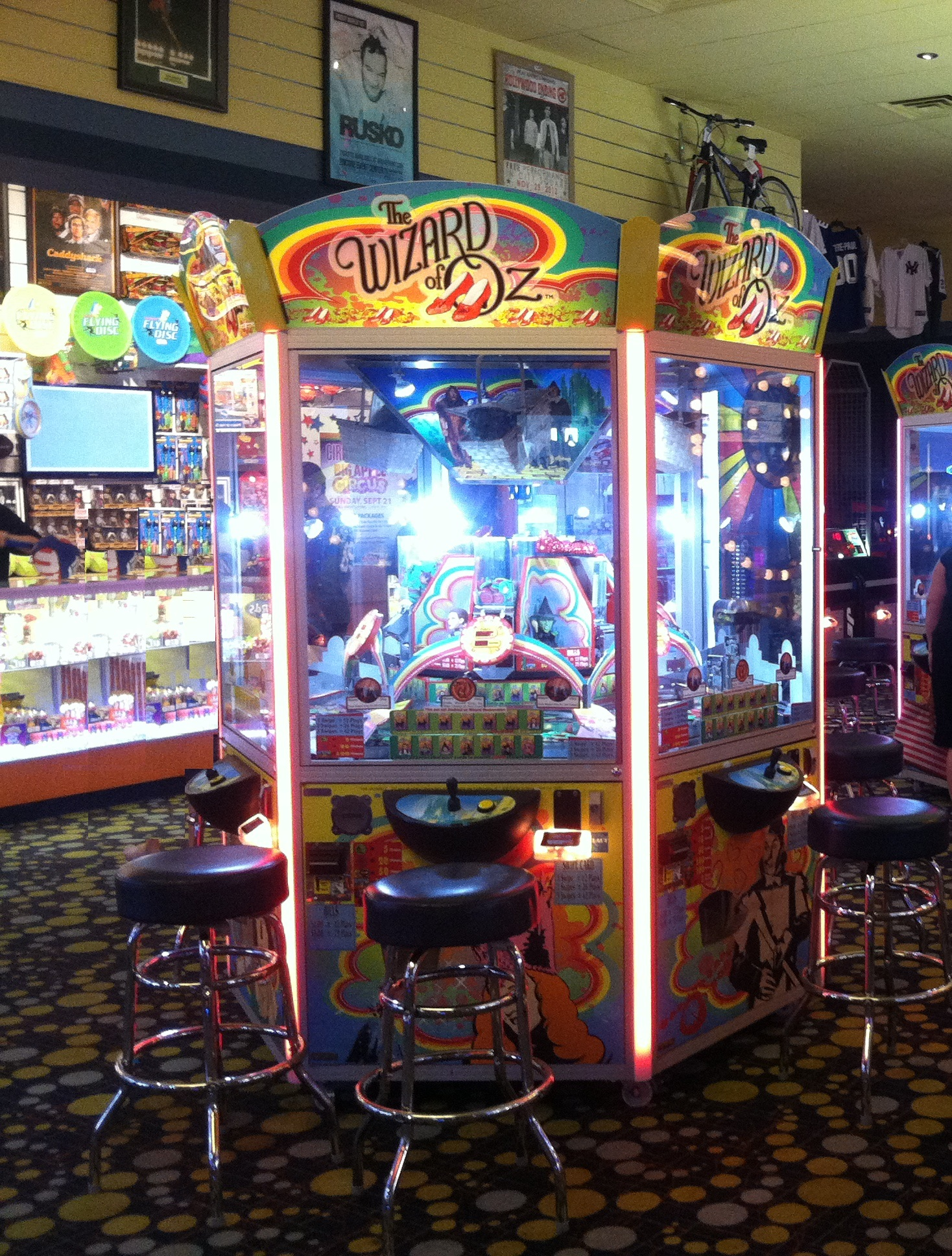
A 2015 Wizard of Oz coin pusher

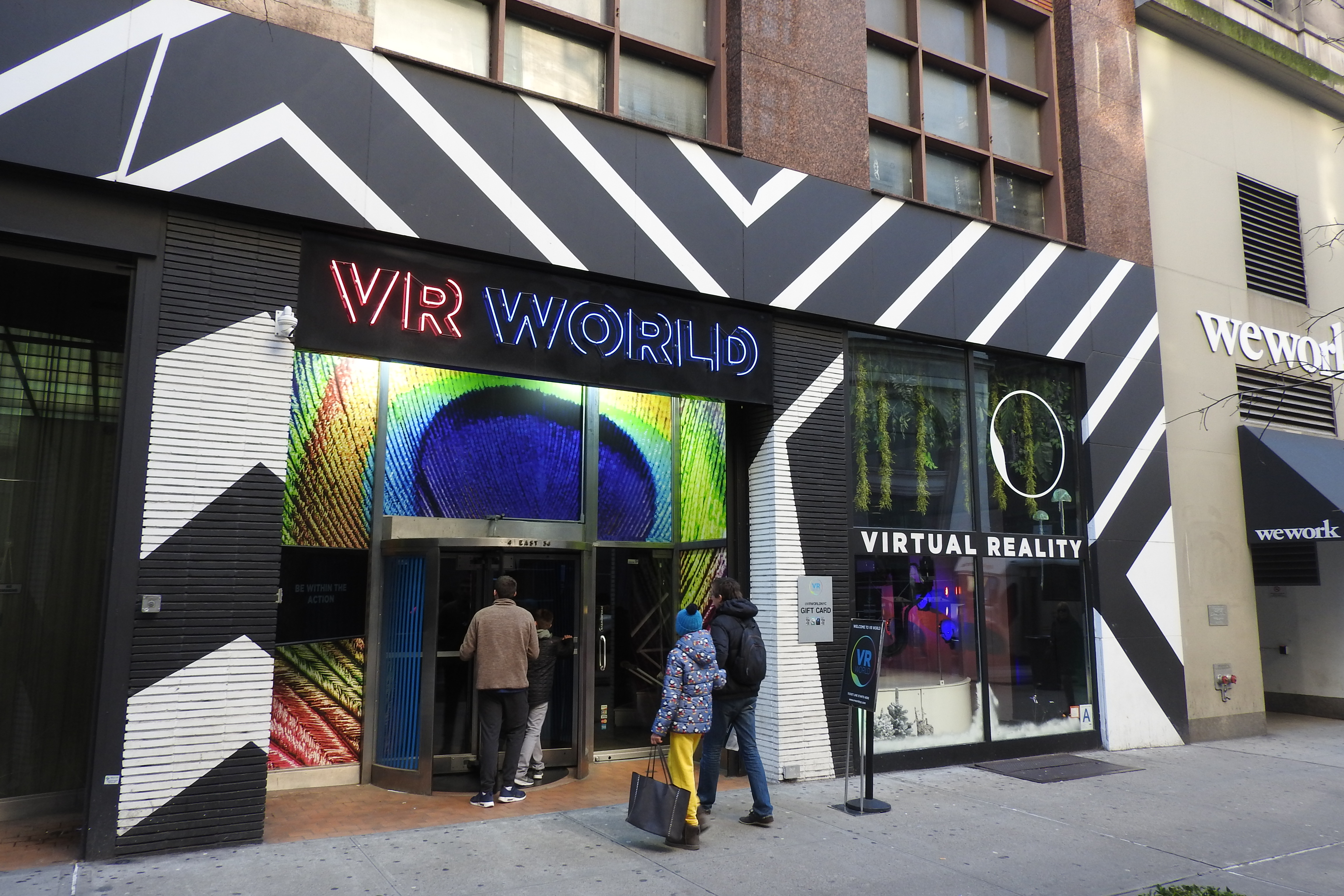
Facade of VR arcade in Manhattan

Manufacturers started adding innovative features to games in the 2000s. Konami used motion and position sensing of the player in Police 911 in 2000 and Mocap Boxing in 2001. Sega started using "Tuning cards" in games such as the Initial D series of games allowing the customer to save game data on a card vended from the game; Namco copied the idea with the Maximum Tune series. Arcade games continued to use a variety of games with enhanced features to attract clients, such as motorized seating areas, interconnected games, and surround sound systems. Redemption and merchandiser games are also a staple of arcades in the 2000s. One of the most popular redemption games, Deal or No Deal by ICE, simulates the popular television game show. Merchandiser games such as Stacker by LAI Games gives the player the chance to win high end prizes like iPods and video game consoles.

At the same time as these innovations, a small resurgence in the interest of classic video games and arcades grew with the opening of Barcade in Brooklyn, New York in 2004. Barcade combined a video arcade and full bar, with a strict focus on classic machines from the 1970s and 1980s, known as the golden age of arcade video games. The idea proved popular and Barcade received recognition as a good place to play classic video game cabinets, because it is "one of the few places where classic arcade games can still be found in public, and in good working order." Barcade's success influenced other similarly themed businesses which opened across the country. Other arcades, like Ground Kontrol in Portland, Oregon, began including full bars in their arcades. Even regular bars added classic arcade games to their venues.

As the trend grew, the industry and press looked for ways to classify these arcade bar hybrids, with the DNA Association branding them "social-tainment" and also referring to them as "game bars". Many of these newer game bars proved to be popular and expansion continued.

In the UK, classic arcades such as Casino and Trocadero, both located in London, closed, with some of the games from Trocadero finding their way to a new arcade, Heart of Gaming in North Acton. The newer Loading Soho Gaming Cafe features arcade machines manufactured by Bespoke Arcades for its customers to use. The UK is also home to the largest arcade in Europe, Arcade Club, located in Bury, Greater Manchester. Home to over 400 original arcade machines, it is recognised as the largest collection in Europe. In May 2019 Arcade Club opened a second venue in Leeds with a third announced for Blackpool opening in 2020, with actual opening delayed to 2022 due to the Covid-19 pandemic.

== Types of games ==
=== Video games ===
The video games are typically in arcade cabinets. The most common kind are uprights, tall boxes with a monitor and controls in front. Customers insert coins or tokens into the machines (or, in newer models, use credit cards or mobile devices) and stand in front of them to play the game. These traditionally were the most popular arcade format, although presently American arcades make much more money from deluxe driving games and ticket redemption games. However, Japanese arcades, while also heavily featuring deluxe games, continue to do well with traditional JAMMA arcade video games.

Some machines, such as Ms. Pac-Man and Joust, are occasionally in smaller boxes with a flat, clear glass or acrylic glass top; the player sits at the machine playing it, looking down. This style of arcade game is known as a cocktail-style arcade game table or tabletop arcade machine, since they were first popularized in bars and pubs. For two player games on this type of machine, the players sit on opposite sides with the screen flipped upside down for each player. A few cocktail-style games had players sitting next to rather than across from one another. Both Joust and Gun Fight had these types of tables.

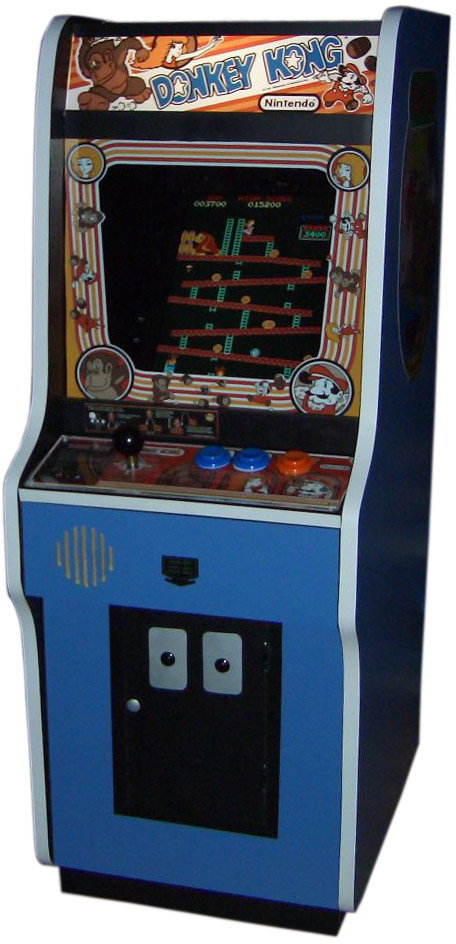
The Donkey Kong video game was popular in video arcades during the 1980s.

Some arcade games, such as racing games, are designed to be sat in or on. These types of games are sometimes referred to as sit-down games. Sega and Namco are two of the largest manufacturers of these types of arcade games.

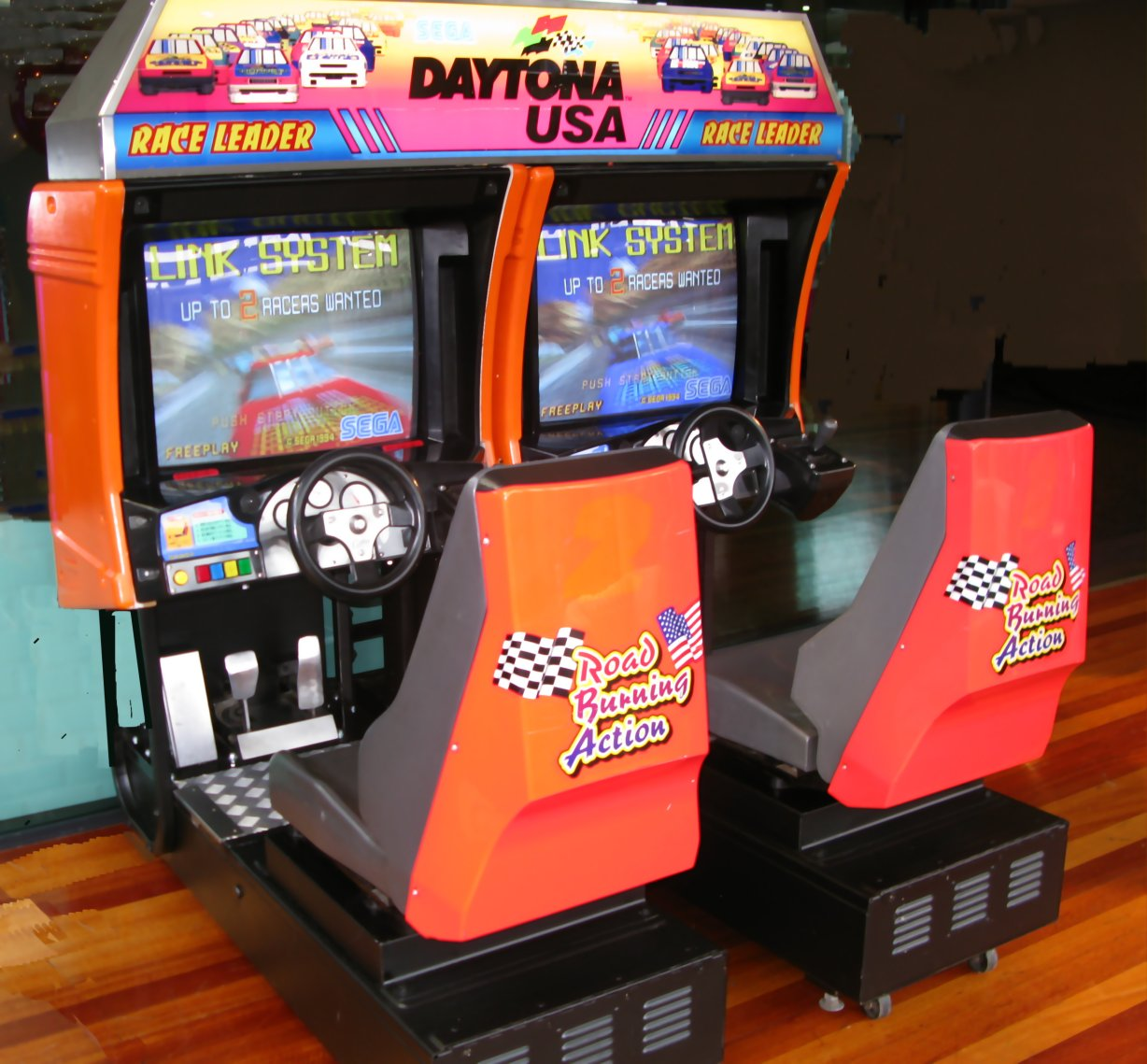
Daytona USA, by Sega. Two player version, although up to eight could be linked for multiplayer racing

=== Other games ===
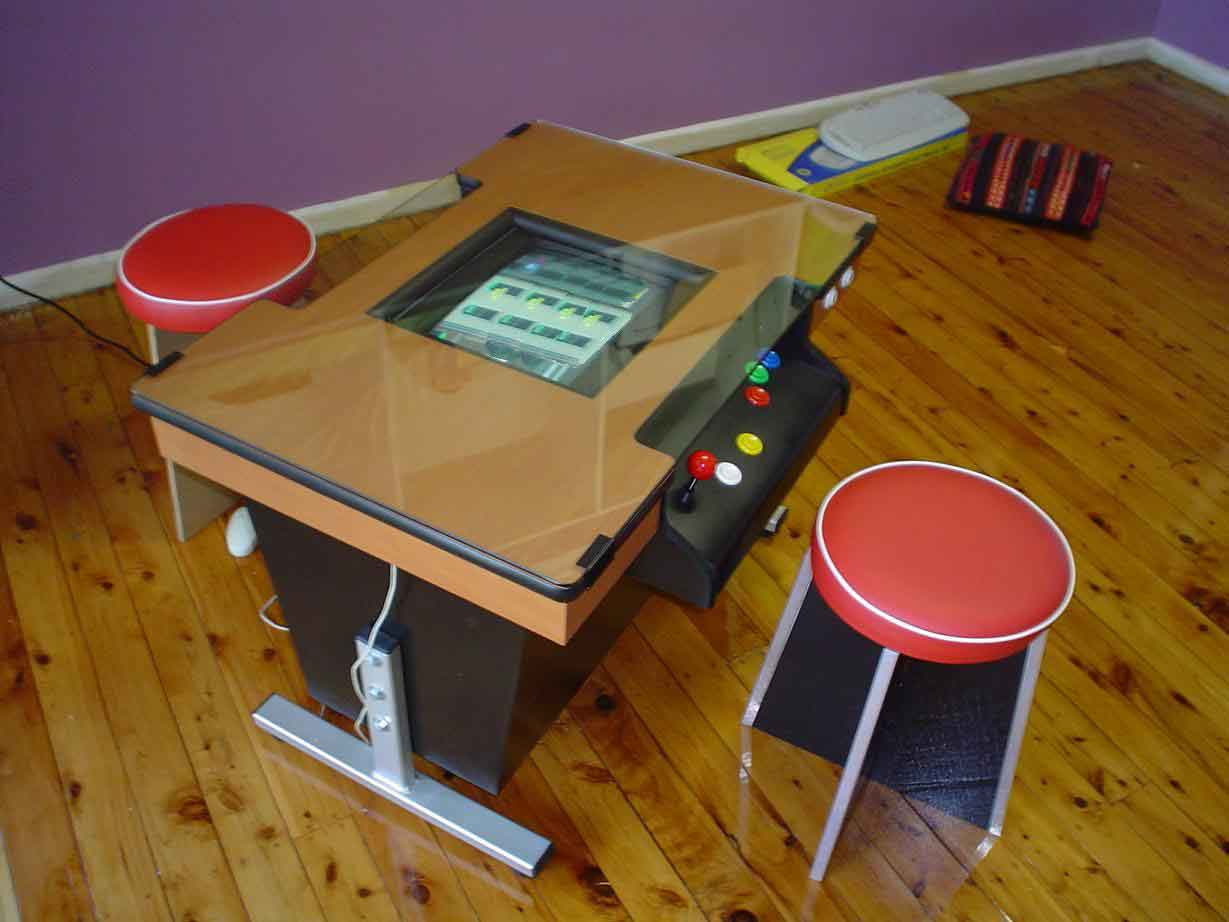
A cocktail cabinet tabletop arcade machine

Other games include pinball machines, redemption games and merchandiser games. Pinball machines have a tilted, glass-covered play area in which the player uses mechanical flippers to direct a heavy metal ball towards lighted targets. Redemption games reward winners with tickets that can be redeemed for prizes such as toys or novelty items. The prizes are usually displayed behind a counter or in a glass showcase, and an arcade employee gives the items to players after counting their tickets. Merchandiser games reward winners with prizes such as stuffed toys, CDs, DVDs, or candy which are dispensed directly from the machine.

In some countries, some types of video arcades are legally allowed to provide gambling machines such as slot machines and pachinko machines. Large arcades may also have small coin-operated ride-on toys for small children. Some businesses, such as Dave & Buster's, combine a bar and restaurant with a video arcade. The ROUND1 entertainment chain combines a large arcade with a full-service bowling alley, along with billiards and karaoke.

Arcades typically have change machines to dispense tokens or quarters when bills are inserted, although larger chain arcades, such as Dave and Busters and Chuck E. Cheese are deviating towards a refillable card system. Retro Arcades are going towards a pay by admission system with the games themselves set to free play. Arcades may also have vending machines which sell soft drinks, candy, and chips. Arcades may play recorded music or a radio station over a public address system. Video arcades typically have subdued lighting to inhibit glare on the screen and enhance the viewing of the games' video displays, as well as of any decorative lighting on the cabinets.

== See also ==
- List of arcade games
- Musée Mécanique
- Pinball
- Sega World
- Timeline of video arcade game history
- Video game arcade cabinet
