= LAI Games =

Arcade game and video game developer

- Type: Subsidiary
- Industry: Out-of-home entertainment
- Founded: 23 January 1958; 68 years ago Perth, Western Australia
- Founder: Malcolm Steinberg
- Headquarters: Dallas, Texas, United States
- Number of employees: ~100
- Parent: Helix Leisure Pte Ltd
- Website: laigames.com

LAI Games (an abbreviation of Leisure and Allied Industries) is an arcade game and video game developer owned and operated by Helix Leisure Pte Ltd. It is recognised as an early pioneer of the family entertainment centre (FEC) concept for its founding of one of the first FECs, Timezone, in 1978.

LAI Games operates worldwide and is headquartered in Dallas, Texas.

== History ==
LAI Games was founded in Perth, Australia in 1958 by Malcolm Steinberg as Leisure and Allied Industries. Today, it operates under its abbreviated name LAI Games.

== Consumer video games ==
During the COVID-19 pandemic, LAI Games started developing consumer video games.

The first consumer product launched was Arcade Online in late 2020, an online browser game in which users are able to play real arcade games remotely. This was followed in early 2021 by the announcement of Arcade Legend, a consumer virtual reality game where players can build and operate their own virtual arcade venue with interactable replicas of real-world arcade games, planned for release in 2022.

== Notable arcade games ==
- Stacker
- Speed of Light
- Let's Bounce
- Color Match
- Angry Birds Coin Crash
- Pearl Fishery
- Mount Shabang
- Lighthouse
- Drop Zone
- Sonic Beat
- Timebuster

== Awards ==
LAI Games has won seven AMOA Innovator Awards for its arcade games, including Let's Bounce and HYPERshoot in 2017, Virtual Rabbids VR in 2018, HYPERpitch in 2020 and Angry Birds Coin Crash in 2021.
