= Batman (2013 arcade game) =

2013 video game

- Advertisement poster
- Developer: Specular Interactive
- Publisher: Raw Thrills
- Series: Batman
- Platform: Arcade
- Release: December 2013
- Genre: Vehicular combat
- Mode: Single-player

Batman is a vehicular combat game based on the DC Comics character Batman, developed by Specular Interactive and released by Raw Thrills for arcades in 2013. The game can be single-player or multi-player (if there is a linked cabinet).

== Gameplay ==
In Batman, players control Batman as he drives the Batmobile through Gotham City to recapture supervillain escapees from Arkham Asylum. Players can choose to pursue the Joker, Bane, or Mr. Freeze; each of these gameplay routes, available in "easy" and "hard" variations, features a predetermined set of six vehicular combat missions to complete. Players must use the Batmobile to chase and eliminate specified targets, such as vehicles filled with henchmen. Certain missions feature other Batman villains, such as the Scarecrow and Catwoman, while one mission in each gameplay route sees the player fly The Bat from The Dark Knight Rises. Weapon upgrades such as a Sky Drone, Batarangs and a Battering Ram can be collected to more quickly and effectively destroy targets. A timer is constantly decreasing during gameplay; the remaining time is extended with each mission successfully completed. The game ends when the timer fully depletes or the Batmobile is destroyed, at which point the player is given the choice to insert additional credits to resume play or abandon the game.

The game has a profile system for players to save their game progress and resume at a later time. Ten different Batmobile designs from previous Batman media are available for use in the game. The full list includes the following:

- Batman (1966 TV series)
- Batman (1966 TV series) (Chrome Version)
- Batman (1989 film)
- Batman: The Animated Series
- Batman Forever
- Batman & Robin
- The Dark Knight
- Batman: The Brave and the Bold
- Batman: Arkham Asylum
- The Dark Knight Rises

== Cabinet ==
The arcade cabinet for Batman consists of over 500 color shifting LEDs, a Batman-styled seat, and a steering wheel with force feedback, as well as a large glowing Bat emblem above the cabinet. Different on-screen actions trigger the various lighting effects and patterns of the cabinet.

== Development ==
Development for Batman started in 2011 at Specular Interactive, who worked with Warner Brothers to build all of the Batmobiles and the Gotham City environment. According to Steve Ranck, the Specular Interactive team spent a lot of time building Gotham City, which in this game "is nearly 10 square miles of various suburbs, unique neighborhoods, elevation changes, tunnels, bridges, hills, dirt roads, jumps, secret paths, etc."

Also according to Steve Ranck, the game contains 20 characters "with nearly 1,000 lines of spoken dialog, 3 fully animated boss characters" and 36 missions over 6 stages.

Batman uses licensed visibility software, Umbra 3, to handle the occlusion culling in its game. The system has been developed by Umbra Software.
