= Specular Interactive =

Specular Interactive, Inc.
- Type: Privately held company
- Industry: Video games
- Founded: 2007
- Headquarters: Foothill Ranch, California, United States
- Website: http://www.specular.com/

Specular Interactive, Inc. was an arcade game entertainment company based in Foothill Ranch, California. It is best known for developing arcade games H2Overdrive, Dirty Drivin', and Batman (2013 arcade game). It closed in 2018.

== History ==
Specular Interactive was formed in early 2007 by Steve Ranck. Before Specular, Steve founded Swingin’ Ape Studios.

It was announced in November 2007 that Specular Interactive had signed an agreement with Raw Thrills to create a premium coin-operated arcade game. Under the agreement, Specular Interactive would design and develop the game while Raw Thrills would manufacture and publish the game worldwide.

The company's first game was H2Overdrive, followed by Dirty Drivin' . In 2013, Specular Interactive teamed with Raw Thrills and Warner Bros. to release Batman (2013 arcade game).

The company has been interested in developing a sequel to Metal Arms: Glitch in the System as the team at Specular was behind the cult favorite.

== Games ==
- H2Overdrive (2009)
- Dirty Drivin' (2011)
- Batman (2013 arcade game) (2013)
