= Jurassic Park Arcade =

2015 video game

- Developer: Raw Thrills
- Programmer: John Scott
- Artist: Nate Vanderkamp
- Series: Jurassic Park
- Platform: Arcade
- Release: NA: March 2015
- Genre: Rail shooter
- Modes: Single-player, multiplayer

Jurassic Park Arcade is a 2015 light gun rail shooter arcade game developed by Raw Thrills. The game is based on the original trilogy of the Jurassic Park film series.

== Gameplay ==
Jurassic Park Arcade is played across nine levels, set at the Jurassic Park theme park on the fictional island of Isla Nublar. A security team has been sent to retrieve one dinosaur from each species located on the island, which is becoming unstable due to an erupting volcano. The protagonist's colleagues who are left in the park must be defended as well and shooting them would result with players taking damage. Five weapons are available to the player throughout the game. Three boss enemies must be defeated throughout the game: Triceratops, Tyrannosaurus, and Spinosaurus. Other creatures appear as minor enemies throughout the game: Velociraptor, Utahraptor, Dilophosaurus, Microraptor, Compsognathus, Brachiosaurus, Stegosaurus and Pteranodon.

== Development ==
Development began in 2011, lasted more than three years, and cost $4 million. The development team studied previous Jurassic Park games and various iconic scenes from the first three films in the series. The developers received an original Jurassic Park arcade cabinet based on the first film, which inspired them to implement that game's fast-moving action into Jurassic Park Arcade. The developers chose to set the game on Isla Nublar, the location of the first film, rather than Isla Sorna, to include iconic locations from the first film. Unlike the films, which primarily involve dinosaurs escaping, the developers wanted to present a story in which the player must capture the free-roaming dinosaurs.

John Scott served as the game's lead programmer. Nate Vanderkamp, the game's lead artist and one of the primary game designers, said that many planned locations and creatures did not make it into the game during development: "I'm pretty sure that by the end we had cut more ideas than actually made it into the game". Initially, the developers had hoped to include an aquatic reptile, as well as a potential level set in a city. Originally, the developers also planned to include nine dinosaur boss enemies, consisting of the largest and most threatening dinosaurs possible. The developers settled for three dinosaurs instead: the Spinosaurus, Triceratops, and Tyrannosaurus. These animals "worked out the best" for the combat style used in the game while providing variety for the player.

The development team, most of which had never worked on a shooting game before, had faced various technical challenges, working with a new game engine and new 3D software. Vanderkamp said that the biggest challenge was proper pacing: "Balancing the enormous action and attack sequences but still giving players time to breathe and regroup took a very deliberate effort and was definitely a learning process for us all". Raw Thrills worked closely with Universal to ensure that the game's dinosaurs resembled their real-life counterparts, while also maintaining their appearances from the films. To reflect the latest scientific discoveries, some of the game's dinosaurs were animated with feathers and bright skin colors. The game was first unveiled at the International Association of Amusement Parks and Attractions in November 2014, and was later shown at the U.K.'s EAG Expo in January 2015.

== Release ==
A regular sit-down cabinet was released in March 2015, and a deluxe cabinet with motion seats was released in April 2015.
