= Bay Tek Entertainment =

American arcade game manufacturer

- Formerly: Bay-Tek, Inc (1977-2005); Bay Tek Games (2005-2018)
- Industry: Arcade game Video games
- Founded: 1977; 49 years ago
- Headquarters: Pulaski, Wisconsin
- Key people: Larry Treankler (Chairman)
- Products: Video game software
- Website: baytekent.com

Bay Tek Entertainment is an American arcade game manufacturer based in Pulaski, Wisconsin. The company specializes in ticket redemption and carnival themed games.

== History ==
Bay Tek was founded in 1977 by Larry Treankler in his father's basement. The company's early games were rolldown type games before they diversified to other redemption game genres.

In 1995, they released their first non-rolldown redemption game, Star Shooter. The next year, Bay Tek started to release alley rollers as well, which included titles like Basket Fever, Bustin’ Balloons, Bug Bash, and eventually Fire Ball.

In 1997, Bay-Tek acquired Coin Concepts, whose titles include Home Run Hitter and Six Gun Saloon. Two years later, Bay-Tek acquired New Mexico-based Seidel Amusements, best known for Smokin' Token, Goin Rollin, Wonder Wheel, Horsin' Around, and Hitter's Rally. Bay-Tek eventually acquired Meltec Inc (best known for Big Mouth) & South Carolina-based Victory Lane Ideas (creators of Stock Car Challenge).

In February 2016, Bay Tek Games acquired Skee-Ball Amusement Games, Inc. from Joe Sladek, inheriting titles like the legacy Skee-Ball rights, as well as Super Shot, Tower of Power, and Spin-N-Win, and eventually acquired Dimensional Branding Group a few years later.

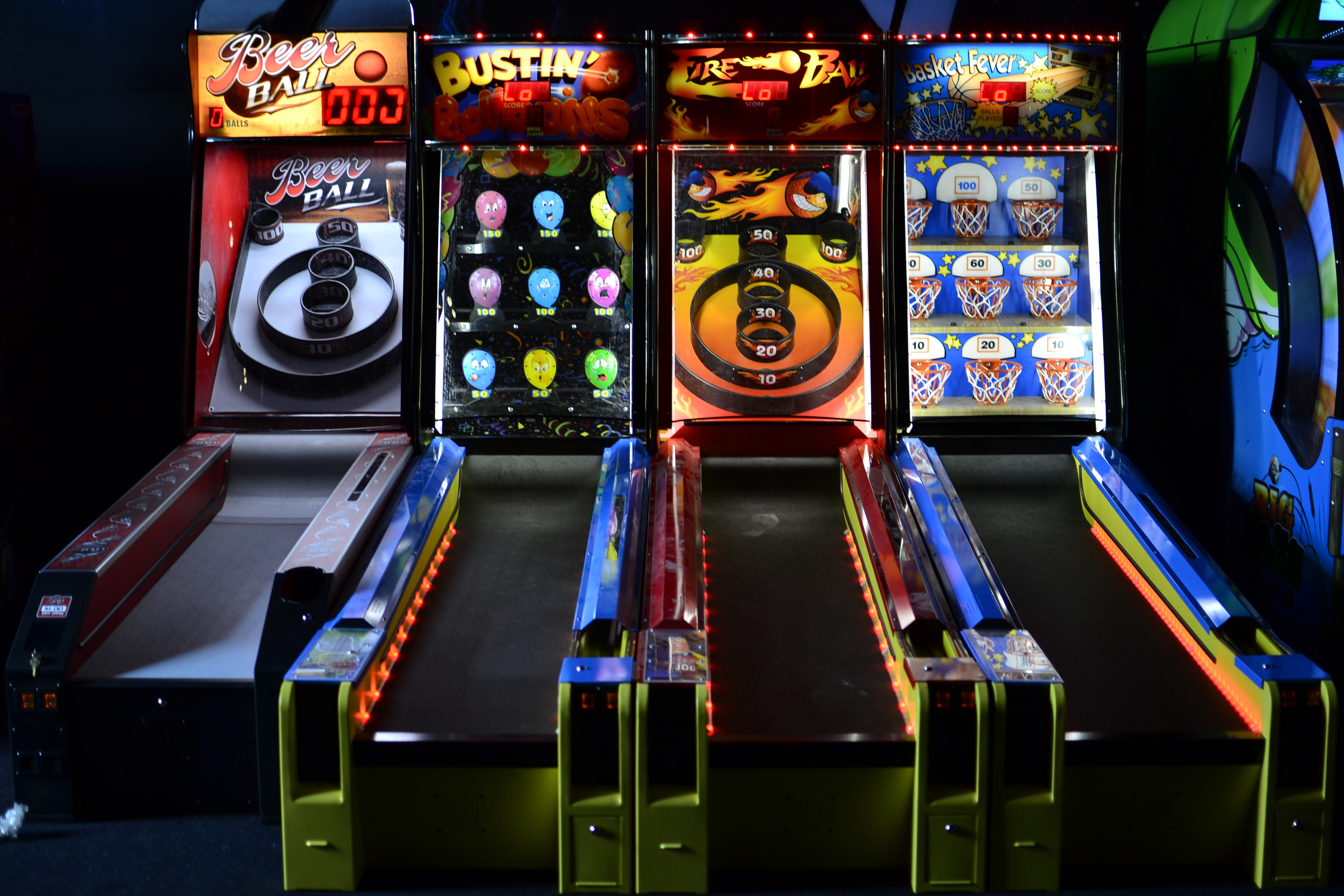
Bay Tek arcade games

== Notable products ==
- Axe Master
- Flappy Bird
- Connect Four
- Connect Four Hoops
- HyperNova
- Lil Ticket Monsters
- Pop the Lock
- Prize Hub
- Skee-Ball
- Whistle Stop (based on the 1946 film of the same name)
- Super Shot
- Quik Drop
- Grand Piano Keys
- Big Bass Wheel
- Ticket Monster
- Full Tilt
- Rock the Rim
- Sink It
- Spin-N-Win
- Willy Crash
- Tower of Tickets (with Elaut Group)
