= Raw Thrills =

American arcade game company

Raw Thrills, Inc.
- Type: Private
- Industry: Video games
- Founded: 2001
- Headquarters: Skokie, Illinois, United States
- Website: rawthrills.com

Raw Thrills, Inc. is an American arcade video game entertainment company based in Skokie, Illinois. It is best known for developing arcade games based on films.

== History ==
Raw Thrills was founded in 2001 by Eugene Jarvis, Deepak Deo, and Andrew Eloff. Early on, the company had a staff of seven, consisting largely of other former Midway Games employees. It started off developing video casino slot machines.

In 2003, Raw Thrills released its first independent coin-op game, Target: Terror, a light-gun shooter game. Later that year, an upgraded version called Target: Terror Gold (also known as Target: Force) was released. It featured bonus levels, end-of-round awards, and other performance enhancements. Target: Terror was the first gun game designed under the direction of Jarvis. The game was later brought to the Nintendo Wii in 2008 by Konami.

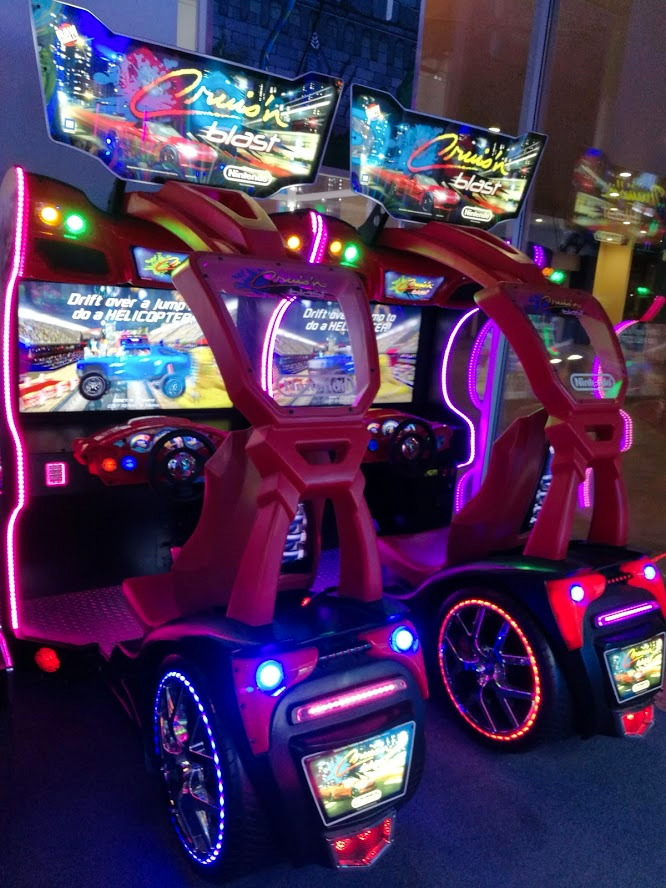
Cruis 'n Blast arcade cabinets, released by Raw Thrills in 2017

In 2004, the company released its second game, The Fast and the Furious, a racing game based on the Universal Studios movie of the same name. Tsunami Visual Technologies later made a motion version of the game for large family entertainment centers. The game was brought to the Wii in 2007 by Midway under the name Cruis'n with all The Fast and the Furious references hastily removed.

In 2006, Raw Thrills merged with Play Mechanix, the developer of the Big Buck franchise, which was founded in 1995 by George Petro, a former designer for Midway Games. That year, they released Big Buck Hunter Pro and The Fast and the Furious: Super Bikes. In 2007 Raw Thrills released The Fast and the Furious: Drift.

In 2008, the company released Big Buck Safari in multiple configurations. It also released Nicktoons Nitro, a kart racing game featuring licensed characters from various Nickelodeon Nicktoons including SpongeBob SquarePants, Timmy Turner from The Fairly OddParents, Aang from Avatar: The Last Airbender, Invader Zim, Jimmy Neutron, and Danny Phantom.

In January 2009, Raw Thrills and Specular Interactive co-produced H2Overdrive, a spiritual successor to the Midway arcade racer Hydro Thunder. Specular Interactive was made up of several ex-Midway employees who had worked on Hydro Thunder. It received high praise from critics. A motion-based version was also produced in November 2009 that was handled by Namco Bandai Games and UNIS. UNIS also holds the rights to distribute the game in China.

Also in 2009, Raw Thrills teamed up with Konami and Activision to produce Guitar Hero Arcade, based off Guitar Hero III: Legends of Rock. Raw Thrills engineered the game while Konami and Activision were involved to cover patenting and licensing issues respectively. It sold over 2,000 units in just three months. The company also unveiled an update to Big Buck Hunter Pro, called Open Season.

In February 25, 2010, Raw Thrills and Play Mechanix released Terminator Salvation, a deluxe light-gun shooter based on the 2009 film of the same name. The game received early praise from arcade operators as it exceeded earnings expectations during testing. It released a new Frogger video redemption game near the end of the year. Raw Thrills partnered with Specular again to release Dirty Drivin' in 2011. It also worked with Specular and Warner Bros. to release the Batman driving arcade game in 2013.

By 2014, the company employed over 60 developers. That year, it unveiled Jurassic Park Arcade at IAAPA after three years of development. A light-gun shooter based on the Jurassic Park franchise, it was released the following year. In 2015, Raw Thrills launched a worldwide anti-piracy campaign after discovering multiple Chinese companies were manufacturing and distributing counterfeit games in Asia and Australia. Illegal versions of SuperBikes 2 and Dirty Drivin' were seized by authorities.

In 2016, Raw Thrills licensed a new video game in the Cruis'n franchise from Nintendo to develop Cruis'n Adventure. The game was later rebranded as Cruis'n Red Line. It was released as Cruis'n Blast in 2017. Raw Thrills released the fighting game Injustice Arcade, featuring characters from DC Comics, in 2017. Collectable cards were later added to the game. It also produced the Teenage Mutant Ninja Turtles arcade game based on the 2012 television series and The Walking Dead arcade game based on the TV series. The developers were tasked with creating a shooting game without the use of a gun, leading to its focus on crossbow shooting.

In 2018, the company introduced Halo: Fireteam Raven, based on the popular Halo franchise. It was released in a four-player format and offered Xbox Live connectivity. A two-player version was introduced in 2019. Also in 2019, the company revamped the Hall of Fame section on its website for tracking high scores and organizing tournaments.

Despite the COVID-19 pandemic and its effects on the arcade industry, Raw Thrills still managed to release Nitro Trucks in 2020. King Kong of Skull Island, the company's first VR game was delayed until 2021. On June 16, 2021, Raw Thrills announced a port for its arcade game Cruis'n Blast for the Nintendo Switch system. It marks the company's first console game.

In 2023, Arcade1Up released The Fast & Furious Deluxe Arcade Game cabinet, which included the first game in the series from Raw Thrills, along with Drift. It also unveiled its Big Buck Hunter Pro Deluxe cabinet, which included Big Buck Hunter Pro, Big Buck Hunter Pro Open Season, Big Buck Hunter Safari and Big Buck Hunter Safari Outback.

King Kong of Skull Island II, an update to its VR game, became available in February 2024. An advanced port of the 2017 TMNT game, titled Teenage Mutant Ninja Turtles Arcade: Wrath of the Mutants, was released in April for home consoles. In 2025, Fast & Furious: Arcade was released on the Nintendo Switch, PlayStation 5, and Xbox Series under the name Fast & Furious: Arcade Edition.

== Games ==
- Target: Terror (2004)
- Target: Terror GOLD (2004)
- The Fast and the Furious (2004)
- Big Buck Hunter Pro (2006)
- The Fast and the Furious: Super Bikes (2006)
- The Fast and the Furious: Drift (2007)
- Big Buck Safari (2008)
- Nicktoons Nitro (2008)
- Big Buck Hunter Pro: Open Season (2009)
- Guitar Hero Arcade (2009)
- H2Overdrive (2009)
- Terminator Salvation (2010)
- Wheel of Fortune (2010)
- Super Bikes 2 (2010)
- Fast & Furious: SuperCars (2010)
- Frogger (2010)
- Big Buck World (2010)
- Dirty Drivin' (2011)
- Big Buck HD (2012)
- Cars (arcade game) (2012)
- Doodle Jump Arcade (2012)
- Winter X Games SnoCross (2012)
- Batman (2013)
- Pac-Man Chomp Mania (2013)
- Aliens Armageddon (2014)
- Barrel Of Monkeys (2014)
- Super Alpine Racer (2014)
- Jurassic Park Arcade (2015)
- MotoGP (2015)
- World's Largest Pac-Man (2016)
- Galaga Assault (2016)
- Choppy Wood (2017)
- Cruis'n Blast (2017)
- Alien: Covenant (2017)
- Space Invaders Frenzy (2017)
- The Walking Dead (2017)
- X Games Snowboarder (2017)
- Injustice Arcade (2017)
- Teenage Mutant Ninja Turtles (2017)
- Halo: Fireteam Raven (2018)
- Marvel Contest of Champions (2019)
- Slither.io (2019)
- Super Bikes 3 (2019)
- Nerf Arcade (2019)
- Nitro Trucks (2020)
- Big Buck Hunter: Reloaded (2020)
- Bust-A-Move Frenzy (2020)
- King Kong of Skull Island VR (2021)
- Minecraft Dungeons Arcade (2021)
- Fast & Furious Arcade (2022)
- Moto GP VR (2023)
- T-Rex Safari VR Adventure (2024)
- Angry Birds Boom! (2024)
- Godzilla Kaiju Wars VR (2024)
- King Kong of Skull Island II (2024)
- NBA Superstars™(2024)
- The Wizard of Oz (2025)
- Top Gun: Maverick (2025)
- Jackpot Racer (2025)
- Fast & Furious: Arcade Edition (2025)
- Godzilla Kaiju Wars Deluxe (2026)

Unreleased: Dance Central 3, Q*bert, World's Largest Frogger
