= Norman Crowley =

Irish tech entrepreneur

- Born: Clonakilty
- Citizenship: Irish
- Education: Clonakilty Community College
- Occupation: Entrepreneur
- Years active: 1995-present
- Organization: CoolPlanet
- Website: Official biography

Norman Crowley is an entrepreneur from County Cork, Ireland. Through the 1990s and 2010s, he built and sold several technology businesses, eventually focusing on climate change mitigation. In 2009, he created an energy project consultancy called Crowley Carbon, which has since grown into a group of environmental technology companies called CoolPlanet.

== Early life ==
He was born in Clonakilty, County Cork, and attended Clonakilty Community College. He grew up on his family's farm, where his father, taught him how to weld. He learned to write computer code in his late teens.

== Career ==
=== Technology ===
Crowley established his first business in 1995, evolving this from the welding business to a technology business in the mid-1990". This business, Trinity Commerce, became an eCommerce service company based in Dublin. In 1999, he sold a 51% majority stake for €12 million to Eircom, who outbid Esat Digifone in what became a bidding war between the two telecommunications companies. The company was later renamed ebeon.

Crowley served as the chief executive of Inspired Broadcast Networks. The company created and supplied touchscreen terminals that primarily appeared in pubs across the UK. The machines hosted digital vending services such as mobile phone and utility prepayment services alongside audiovisual media and the UK government's Internet portal gov.uk. The terminals were also the start of a network of Wi-Fi hotspots known as The Cloud, later spun out as a separate business, acquired by BSkyB in 2011. The expanded holding company for the business, Inspired Gaming Group, was in negotiations about a sale to an Icelandic investment bank, FL Group, for a reported $1 billion US Dollars. However, in December 2007, the deal fell through when Iceland's financial crisis became apparent. After the pub business was divested in 2008 and 2009, and Crowley stepped down from his role as co-CEO, a private equity firm bought the group for 74.4 million pounds in 2010.

=== Emissions and electric cars ===
In 2009, he started Crowley Carbon, a business aiming to help organisations reduce their carbon emissions, using a combination of software, professional services and projects. The business has since expanded into a group of environmental technology companies named CoolPlanet that service large companies internationally. With its engineering projects paused in 2020 due to the COVID-19 pandemic, Crowley restructured CoolPlanet around its systems management software. The internet-of-things (IoT) software, originally named Carbon Control Centre or C3, monitors its customers' energy, water and other resource usage in cooling, heating, and compressor systems and highlights inefficiencies.

Crowley also has an electric classic car company, AVA, based in Powerscourt House, Enniskerry. One of AVA's first projects was an electric-powered replica of Tara Browne's 1965 AC Cobra, famous for its psychedelic livery by Doug Binder and Dudley Edwards. The company also builds vehicle control units for vehicles used in the mining industry. Its partners for this project are Climatech Zero, an Australian energy transition specialist to reduce carbon emissions in the mining industry. Under the agreement, CoolPlanet licenses software to Climatech Zero for converting diesel-powered land cruiser-type vehicles to electric in Australia and New Zealand.

== Recognition ==
In 2012, Crowley received a nomination for the Ernst & Young Entrepreneur of the Year Award.
