= Bespoke Arcades =

British arcade machine manufacturer

- Type: Manufacturer
- Industry: Arcade Machines
- Founded: 28 July 2005; 21 years ago
- Headquarters: Covent Garden; London, WC2; United Kingdom
- Website: bespoke-arcades.co.uk

Bespoke Arcades is a British manufacturer of custom-built arcade machines. Bespoke Arcades is a subsidiary of Page Global Ltd and was formed on 28 July 2005. Company clients include Wayne Rooney and Dynamo. Their products are sold at Harrods.

== History ==
Bespoke Arcades was founded on 28 July 2005 by Ben Georget and Phil Patsias in London, United Kingdom. In 2005, the company released their first product, the Synergy tabletop arcade cabinet. This was followed in 2007 by their Apex multi-game upright cabinet with multimedia functionality. In 2009, Bespoke Arcades released their Evo, which is a PlayStation 3 compatible upright arcade machine. In 2011, Bespoke Arcades ran a charity fundraising for the British Red Cross Tsunami Relief Fund. In 2012, the company created an arcade cabinet for 2K Games's XCOM: Enemy Unknown.

== Products ==
Bespoke Arcades manufacture a range of stand-up and sit-down arcade machines including the Apex, Synergy and Evo. They will unveil their Nu-Gen Arcade Machine at the Gamescom exhibition.
