= Rifleman (arcade game) =

Electro-mechanical arcade game

- Developer: Sega
- Publisher: Sega
- Release: 1967

Rifleman is an electro-mechanical arcade game released by Sega Enterprises in 1967, consisting of a target-shooting game with a rifle mounted on the game cabinet. The game had a Wild West theme, and gave the player the results of their shooting on a printed paper card.
