= Skee-Ball =

Arcade game

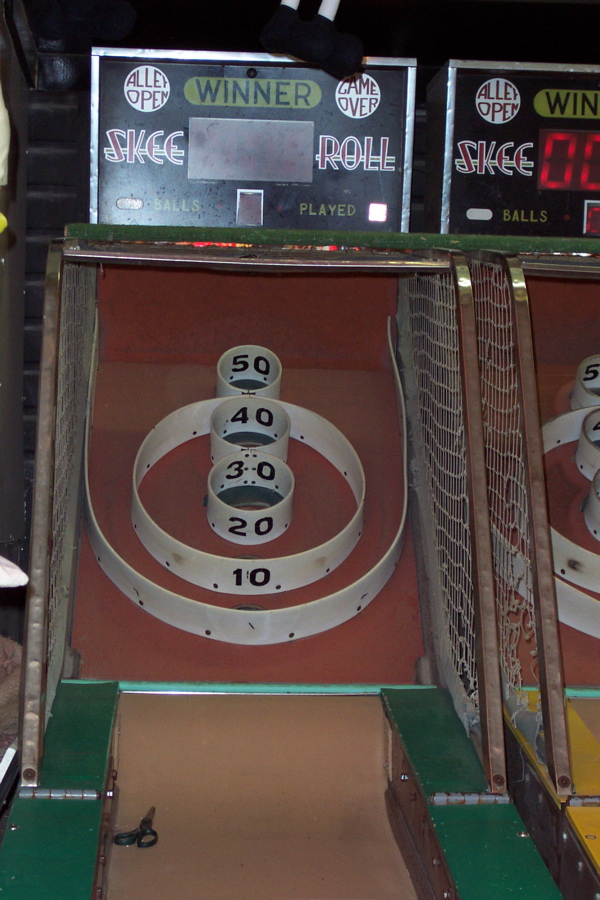
A traditional skee-ball machine. Other skee-ball machines may also include two 100-point holes located at the uppermost corners of the scoring area.

Skee-Ball is an arcade game and one of the first redemption games. It is played by rolling a ball up an inclined lane and over a "ball-hop" hump (resembling a ski jump) that jumps the ball into bullseye rings. The object of the game is to collect as many points as possible by having the ball fall into holes in the rings which have progressively increasing point values the higher the ring is.

== History ==
Skee-Ball was invented and patented in 1908 by Joseph Fourestier Simpson, a resident of Vineland, New Jersey. On December 8, 1908, Simpson was granted U.S. patent 905,941 for his "game". Simpson licensed the game to John W. Harper and William Nice Jr., who created the Skee-Ball Alley Company and began marketing the 32-foot-long (9.8 m) games in early 1909. The game's first apparent mention in the press is a The Press of Atlantic City advertisement of April 17, 1908, mentioned that it had Skee-Ball available for play, and its next day's issue noted that "this new and novel game is being exhibited on the pier." About two months later, the first alley was sold. Alleys continued to sell slowly over the next few years. The company's first advertisement offering Skee-Ball games for sale appeared on April 17, 1909, in Billboard magazine.

The game gained notice across the United States and beyond in July 1909. Popular Mechanics magazine provided an illustration and 250-word detailed description of equipment ("the alley is built in two sections, each 16 ft. long"; "3-1/2 inch ball"). The article also gave the source of the game's name: "Skee-ball bowling, in which the ball is jumped or skeed into the pockets in the same manner as a skee-jumper rises from the bump in his flight."

The game was soon sold to locales beyond Atlantic City and Philadelphia. Salt Lake City's "Saltair" resort featured Skee-Ball by May 1910, and F. J. Cossey opened his "Skee-Ball Parlor" in Monterey, CA in January 1911, installing the game also in Napa, CA that March. The New York Times recorded Manhattan's first Skee-Ball appearance in May 1915.

In January 1910, Nice died unexpectedly, and his heirs inherited the company. The new owners were skeptical about the company's viability and invested as little in the company as possible, leaving Harper without the necessary funding for promotion. After $10,000 of investments by Simpson, the company ran out of money in 1910, and Simpson was deeply in debt. The following year, Simpson lost his house and was living with friends. The company continued to struggle through 1912. Simpson worked with Harper, but they were having difficulty making any headway, and by December 1912 the Skee-Ball Alley Company was moribund.

In 1910, Jonathan Dickinson Este became enamored of the game, and in 1913 he helped Simpson and John W. Harper to revitalize the company. Este installed two alleys at a Princeton location, near the university, to see how well they would do. After a few weeks, interest in the game fizzled, but in 1914 Este installed Skee-Ball in rented space on Atlantic City's boardwalk. He purchased the patent and all rights to the game from Simpson, incorporated The J. D. Este Company to build and market the game, and hired Harper as general manager. In 1917 Este enlisted in the military and turned over operation of the company to his business partners. After his return in 1919 he sold The J. D. Este Company to his partners and exited the business.

Este's business partners renamed the company the "Skee-Ball Company". By 1922, the firm could boast of 1100 alleys in use for the 1921 season, grossing more than a million dollars. They operated the manufacturing and distribution of the game until 1928 when the game was sold to Herman Bergoffen, Hugo Piesen, and Maurice Piesen, who incorporated the National Skee-Ball Company. In 1929, the National Skee-Ball Company of Coney Island, New York, trademarked the name Skee-Ball.

The National Skee-Ball Company organized the first national Skee-Ball tournament at Skee-Ball Stadium in Atlantic City. The tournament alleys were shorter than the alleys that Simpson had built. Over one hundred contestants qualified to play in the tournament. $2400 in prizes were awarded to the winners.

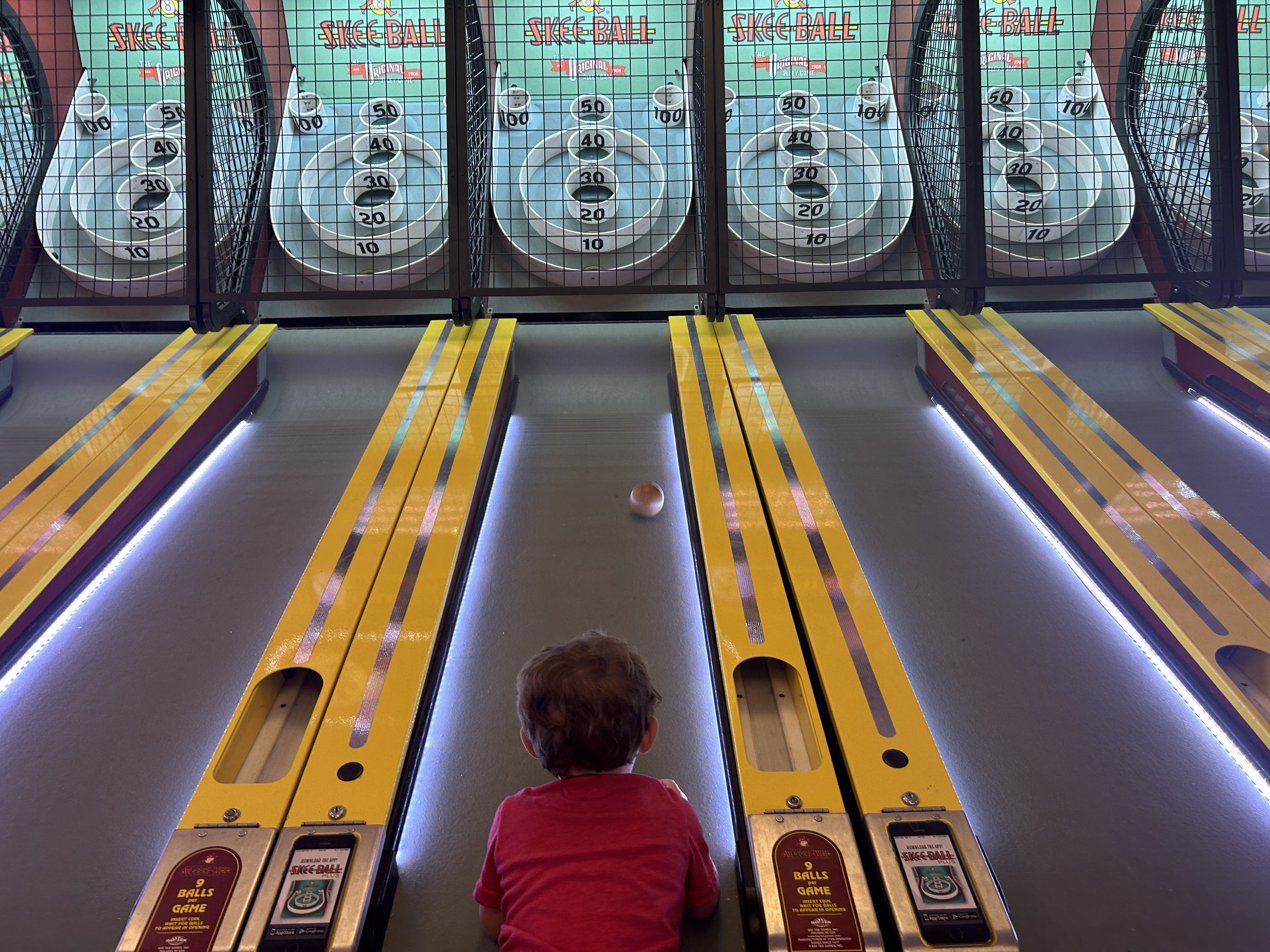
Young child playing skee-ball at Fantasy Island on Long Beach Island, New Jersey, 2023

On 1 June 1935, Bergoffen (b. 1879) died unexpectedly of a heart attack in Atlantic City, leaving Hugo and Maurice Piesen to run the National Skee-Ball Company. In June 1936, The Rudolph Wurlitzer Manufacturing Company bought all of the rights to the game and set up a games division. Wurlitzer produced more than five thousand Skee-Ball alleys and began selling them in December 1936, but they ceased production of alleys in 1937 as demand weakened. Beginning in 1942, Wurlitzer shifted its focus from amusement devices to the war effort by building equipment for the United States government.

As the war drew to a close, the Philadelphia Toboggan Company (PTC) contacted Wurlitzer to ask about either licensing the rights to Skee-Ball or selling it outright. By January 1946, PTC was the new owner and manufacturer of Skee-Ball. That lasted until 1977 when Skee-Ball, Inc., was spun-off from PTC under the same ownership. By 1984, Joe Sladek and three other partners had bought the company. Over the next several years Sladek bought out his partners and renamed the company Skee-Ball Amusement Games Inc. In February 2016, Bay Tek Games, Inc., of Pulaski, Wisconsin, acquired Skee-Ball Amusement Games, Inc., acquiring the rights to the legacy Skee-Ball game and trademark in the process, and moved its manufacturing to Pulaski.

Super Ball!!, a version of Skee-Ball, was a pricing game on the American game show The Price Is Right from 1981 to 1998.

Skee-Ball is now a social sport played in bars in North America, with leagues forming under various banners.

== 1931–32 lawsuit ==
National Skee-Ball Co., Inc, vs. Seyfried was decided by the New Jersey Court of Chancery on 2 February 1932. When Skee-Ball apparatus was sold to an operator around that time, the license stipulated a particular municipality for its use, "or in any other part of the United States, providing there are no skee-ball alleys in operation or licensed for use at said place at time of removal." The lawsuit's defendant purchased units then being operated (by their original purchasers) in Trenton, NJ and Smyrna, DE. He relocated the three alleys first to Manasquan, NJ—where there were no Skee-Ball alleys in place—but then moved them to Seaside Park, NJ, where National Skee-Ball had given Shore Amuseuments an ostensibly exclusive license for its six alleys in that city. The firm sued, but the New Jersey court decreed that, though the Skee-Ball equipment was patented, the firm could not place restrictions on the legal operation of its alleys by owners succeeding the first purchasers.

== Gameplay ==
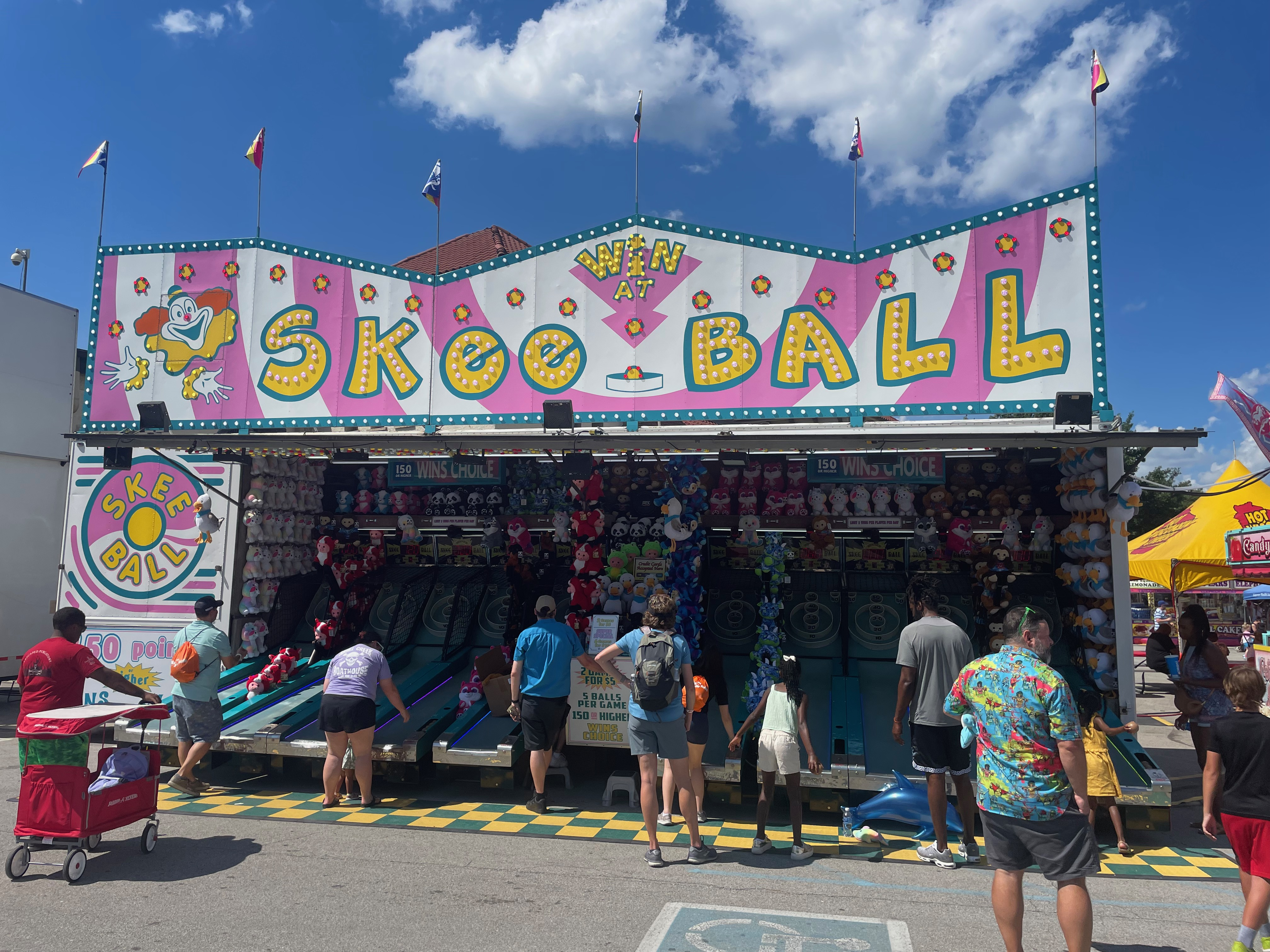
Skee-ball booth at the Indiana State Fair

Gameplay varies depending on the particular machine but, normally, a player, after inserting appropriate payment, receives a queue of (usually nine) balls made of either polished Masonite or heavy plastic and each approximately three inches in diameter. Each machine has an inclined ramp, 10 to 13 feet (3.0 to 4.0 m) long, up which the player must roll the balls. A sudden increase in incline at the end of the ramp (called the "ball-hop") launches the balls above the plane of the ramp toward a series of rings that direct the balls into holes of varying point values, with the smallest and hardest to reach usually giving the most points. The machine dispenses coupons to the player, based on scoring thresholds, either during the game or after the game ends. The coupons are typically traded at the arcade for prizes. Some machines award large coupon bonuses to players who attain or surpass a posted high score.

At traveling carnival midways, prizes are typically won by scoring a certain minimum number of points in one game. This requires an attendant to hand out prizes immediately at the end of games, which is not common in arcade settings. Usually, multiple small prizes can be traded for medium prizes and multiple mediums for large. Perfect or nearly perfect scores earn the largest prize available, while very low scores may earn nothing at all.

== See also ==
- Bull's-Eye Ball
- Fascination (game)
