= Merchandiser =

Arcade gaming device

Claw cranes, often containing plush toys, are a common type of merchandiser.

A merchandiser is a type of arcade gaming device, which features a machine that contains a display of merchandise, which can be won by playing the game. In the trade, such games are described as "skill with prize games", and are a hybrid of games of skill and games of chance, with the preponderance of skill or chance differing between devices and often able to be set by the operator.

== Description ==
Claw cranes are the most common example of a merchandiser. The player guides a claw in an attempt to pick up a prize and drop it into a hole.

A similar class of games are redemption games, where tickets are won and can be redeemed for merchandise prizes, rather than merchandise being won directly. These are both modern forms of carnival games.

Some games can be configured as either redemption games or merchandisers, such as Flamin' Finger.

== Examples ==
Examples include:

- Claw crane
- Stacker
- Money booth
- Ring Master

== Regulation ==
As skill with prize machines, merchandisers are in a legal grey area, due to containing elements of skill and of chance, particularly since payout percentages can to a large extent be set by the operator – such setting leads to machines being described as rigged. In 2017, the Maryland State Lottery and Gaming Control Agency set out regulatory definitions, stating that "'Merchandiser device' means a skills-based amusement device by which a player controls a mechanical or electromechanical claw or other device to retrieve merchandise or prizes." See Claw vending machine § Legality for further statutes pertaining to claw machines. The Maryland regulations provide that merchandiser machines must not provide awards that are "readily convertible to cash," and the games must be fair for all. Similar legislation exists in Alabama, where the law states that the games must require the player to actually have control over the "claw or grasping device," to ensure some level of skill is involved.

Merchandiser machines, like most arcade games, are considered legally distinct from slot machines. However, claims of being largely or entirely skill-based can expose the operator to accusations of unfair practices; thus some lawyers advise operators to not advertise the machines as being skill-based.
