= VR =

VR may refer to:

== Arts, entertainment and education ==
- Vocational rehabilitation
- Virtua Racing, a 1992 arcade racing game by Sega
- Spectre VR, an enhanced version of Spectre
- VR.5, an American science fiction television series in 1995
- VR Troopers, an American action television show from 1994 to 1996
- Vikrant Rona, a 2022 Indian film

== Businesses ==
- VR Group, a Finnish railway company, formerly known as Valtion rautatiet (State Railways)
- Valdosta Railway, in the US state of Georgia
- Victorian Railways, a former railway operator in the Australian state of Victoria
- Viktor & Rolf, an Amsterdam-based fashion house
- German Cooperative Financial Group (Volksbanken und Raiffeisenbanken)
- Cape Verde Airlines (IATA airline code)
- V.R. Technology, sometimes called VRT, a famiclone designer from Hsinchu, Taiwan

== Government and military ==
- Verkhovna Rada of Ukraine, unicameral parliament
- Vetenskapsrådet, the Swedish Research Council
- Volunteer Reserves (United Kingdom)
- Fleet Logistics Support, a squadron of the US Navy

== Science and technology ==
- VR (nerve agent), a nerve gas, also known as Russian VX, Soviet V-gas, Substance 33, or R-33
- Venous return, the rate of bloodflow returning to the heart
- Vibration Reduction, an anti-shake lens technology by Nikon
- Virtual reality therapy, for the treatment of PTSD patients

=== Computing and electronics ===
- Virtual reality, a computer technology that simulates an environment with which a user may interact as if it were there
- VR photography, the creation and viewing of wide-angle panoramic photographs, generally encompassing a full circle
  - QuickTime VR, an image file format developed by Apple for panoramic images
- Videocassette recorder, a device that records and plays back analog audio and video using magnetic tape
- Video renderer
- Voltage regulator, an electric circuit designed to maintain a constant voltage level
- DVD-VR, an editable optical media format

=== Transportation ===
- V_{R}, an aircraft's rotation speed
- VR6 engine, a family of internal combustion engines made by Volkswagen
- Holden Commodore (VR), an automobile introduced by Holden in 1993
- Bristol VR, a double-decker bus built by the Bristol Commercial Vehicles
- VR Group, a Finnish railway company

== Sports ==
- Valentino Rossi (born 1979), an Italian racing driver

== Other uses ==
- Vanguardia Revolucionaria, a Peruvian political group
- Voluntary redundancy, a financial incentive offered by an organisation to encourage employees to voluntarily resign
- University of Iceland VR, three buildings on the University of Iceland campus
- VR, for Victoria Regina, in the royal cypher of Queen Victoria
