= Amusement with prize =

Type of gaming machine

Amusement with prize or amusement with prizes (AWP) are slot machines that provide some level of player interaction. They do not, however, depend on the skill of the player; machines that depend on player skill are called skill with prize (SWP) machines. Both of these terms are trade terms, and such machines are referred to by alternative names by the public.

These machines are commonly named after the software of the arcade style cabinet.

Most common are Cherry Master, Pot-o-gold and the generic term 8-liner.

== United Kingdom ==
The term is particularly used in the United Kingdom, where they are also called fruit machines, and are found in amusement arcades and public houses.

The distinction with slot machines is not clearly defined; in the United Kingdom, such machines found in arcades and pubs are called AWPs, while machines in casinos may instead be called slots. There is different licensing depending on the premise, with AWP machines having lower limits on stake wagered and payout.

== Regulation ==
AWP machines are generally regulated as gambling devices; in the UK, they are regulated under the Gambling Act 2005.

Games that involve skill are considered SWPs, and may be regulated separately; games that provide amusement but no prizes are generally considered a kind of video game.

In Switzerland, AWP machines – but not SWP machines – have been banned since 1 April 2005.
