= Stacker (arcade game) =

Game merchandiser

Picture of the Stacker Club variant; there is also a larger variation which can hold larger prizes.

Stacker is a game merchandiser manufactured by LAI Games, first produced in 2004. The goal of the game is to align rows of lights on top of each other. A player who stacks 11 rows can choose to take a minor prize. A minor prize is usually low in value, sometimes lower than the amount of money the player paid to play the game. A player who stacks the blocks to the top row wins the jackpot prize, called the "major prize." Major prizes vary from machine-to-machine but will often include high-value items such as game consoles, mobile phones, and gift cards.

== Gameplay ==
For the first three levels, there is a row of three blocks which move side-to-side on the LED display. When the player presses the start/stop button, the row of blocks stop moving. Then, another row of blocks appear above the previous row, moving faster than the one before it. Blocks that do not align directly above the previous set are removed. If the player misses completely, the game is over. The number of blocks is automatically reduced to two at level four, then one at level 10. The goal is to consistently get the blocks directly above the previous set, stacking them to the minor prize and ultimately the major prize level. If the player accepts the minor prize, the game ends. Alternatively, the player can continue playing for a major prize. If a player reaches the major prize level on the 15th row, the lights will flash on and off, spelling the word "Win."

== Difficulty ==
At the regular model's highest difficulty setting, the estimated ratio of wins-to-losses is 1-in-800. The margin for losing games can be set to almost double this in the Mega Stacker model which can hold bigger, higher value prizes, at an estimated wins-to-losses ratio of 1-in-1500. The game's operator's manual states a disclaimer that it is "100% a game of skill so although it is very difficult, every single game can be a winning game." While technically possible to win the major prize prior to the set win ratio being reached, the "window" for success is so small that it is infeasible to win. Even though it may appear to be correctly aligned, the block will shift a column if the button is not pressed within the extremely small opportunity window, deliberately causing the player to lose. After the desired ratio is attained, the window is left open for as long as the block is displayed on screen, making it significantly easier for a skilled enough player to win the game.

== Variants ==
Subsequent to the vast success of the Stacker franchise, several variants have been released. Each variant has minor variations, such as color schemes, intended to attract certain age groups.

Stacker Standard
The original Stacker created in 2004. The colorway for this variant is red, yellow, and blue. It is commonly referred to as the "red" model.
Stacker Club
Similar to Stacker Standard but with different colors and graphics aimed towards more mature players. The colorway for this variant is blue and black. It is commonly referred to as the "blue" model.
Stacker Mini
A smaller variant of Stacker, meant for places that do not have enough space for the regular Stacker cabinet. It is red, black, and white and stands about 6 feet tall by 2 feet deep and 2 feet wide. It has only two major prize arms and four minor prize arms instead of the standard four major prize arms and six minor prize arms, and 10 rows of lights instead of 15.
Stacker Giant
A larger variant of Stacker released in the 2000s that is about three times the size of the standard model.
Stacker Double Up
This variant of Stacker only pays out tickets. When players reach the "Double Up Zone," they are offered to double their tickets. When players reach the "Super Bonus Zone," they win the jackpot displayed.
Stack-It
A later variant of Stacker Double Up. It is more similar to the original Stacker game.
Stack 'N' Grab
A Stacker-claw crane hybrid variant of Stacker, in which there are 10 rows of lights and players start with five blocks instead of the standard three. There is no minor prize and when players get to the "Win Level," they have unlimited attempts to grab a prize with the claw.
Stacker Wall Street
A variant of Stacker that can be mounted on a wall and hold a maximum of four prizes.
Mega Stacker
The largest variant of Stacker. This variant has an adjustable ticket amount instead of a minor prize. It also has a platform to stand on and a metal bar to sit on.
Mega Stacker Lite
This variant of Mega Stacker only pays out tickets. It also does not have a platform or metal bar.

== Sales tactics ==
Stacker has been touted as being a successor to crane games.

Stacker cabinets have large windows covering the top half of the cabinet on three sides. The large windows allow passersby to view the prizes which may in turn persuade them to play the game. Such techniques use high-value products that are either difficult to obtain due to cost, especially for young people, or are simply visually appealing. According to the merchandise manual, the recommended major prize value is approximately 200 times the price per play. The four prize rods on a Stacker cabinet are spread far apart and lit from the ceiling to add emphasis.

== Distribution ==
In Europe, the primary distributor of Stacker is the Austrian company funworld AG, distributing in 14 European countries: Germany, Switzerland, France, Greece, Netherlands, Montenegro, Poland, Romania, Slovenia, Sweden, Spain, Czech Republic, Hungary, United Kingdom and Cyprus.
