= Amusement Trades Exhibition International =

UK trade show for the coin-op and amusements trade

The Amusement Trades Exhibition International (ATEI) is the major UK trade show for the coin-op and amusements trade.

== See also ==
- BACTA (British Amusement Caterers Trade Association)
- Coinslot
