= Jurassic Park (franchise) =

American science fiction media franchise

- The first film's logo depicting the skeleton of a Tyrannosaurus
- Created by: Michael Crichton
- Original work: Jurassic Park (1990)
- Owners: Universal Pictures; Amblin Entertainment
- Years: 1990–present

Print publications
- Books: Jurassic Park Adventures: Survivor (2001); Jurassic Park Adventures: Prey (2001); Jurassic Park Adventures: Flyers (2002)
- Novels: Jurassic Park (1990); The Lost World (1995); The Evolution of Claire (2018)
- Comics: List of comics

Films and television
- Films: Jurassic Park (1993); The Lost World: Jurassic Park (1997); Jurassic Park III (2001); Jurassic World (2015); Jurassic World: Fallen Kingdom (2018); Jurassic World Dominion (2022); Jurassic World Rebirth (2025); Untitled eighth film (TBA)
- Short films: Battle at Big Rock (2019); Jurassic World Dominion prologue (2021)
- Animated series: Jurassic World Camp Cretaceous (2020–2022); Jurassic World: Chaos Theory (2024–2025)

Theatrical presentations
- Play: Jurassic World Live (2019)

Games
- Traditional: List of games
- Video games: List of video games

Audio
- Soundtracks: Jurassic Park (1993); The Lost World: Jurassic Park (1997); Jurassic Park III (2001); Jurassic World (2015); Jurassic World: Fallen Kingdom (2018); Jurassic World Dominion (2022); Jurassic World Rebirth (2025)

Miscellaneous
- Toys: List of toys and Lego Jurassic World
- Theme park attractions: Jurassic Park: The Ride (1996); Canopy Flyer (2010); Dino-Soarin' (2010); Jurassic Park Rapids Adventure (2010); The Flying Dinosaur (2016); Jurassic World: The Ride (2019); VelociCoaster (2021)
- Character(s): List of characters

Official website
- jurassicworld.com

Jurassic Park, later referred to as Jurassic World, is an American media franchise created by Michael Crichton, centered on a disastrous attempt to create an animal theme park of de-extinct dinosaurs. It began in 1990 when Universal Pictures and Amblin Entertainment bought the rights to Crichton's novel Jurassic Park before it was published. The book was successful, as was Steven Spielberg's 1993 film adaptation. The film received a theatrical 3D re-release in 2013, and was selected in 2018 for preservation in the United States National Film Registry by the Library of Congress as being "culturally, historically, or aesthetically significant". Crichton's 1995 sequel novel, The Lost World, was followed by a 1997 film adaptation, also directed by Spielberg. Crichton did not write any further sequels in the series, although Spielberg would return as executive producer for each subsequent film, starting with Jurassic Park III (2001).

In 2015, a second trilogy of films began with the fourth film in the series, Jurassic World. The film was financially successful, and was followed by Jurassic World: Fallen Kingdom (2018) and Jurassic World Dominion (2022). The Jurassic World films were co-written by Colin Trevorrow, who also directed the first and third installments in the trilogy. Jurassic World Rebirth, a new film set after the preceding trilogy, was theatrically released on July 2, 2025, without Trevorrow's involvement.

Numerous video games and comic books based on the franchise have been created since the release of the 1993 film, and several water rides have been opened at various Universal Studios theme parks. Lego has produced several animated projects based on the Jurassic World films, including Lego Jurassic World: Legend of Isla Nublar, a miniseries released in 2019. DreamWorks Animation also produced two animated series for Netflix, Jurassic World Camp Cretaceous (2020–2022) and Jurassic World: Chaos Theory (2024–2025), both set during the Jurassic World trilogy.

Jurassic Park is one of the highest-grossing media franchises of all time. The film series is also one of the highest-grossing of all time, having earned over $6 billion at the worldwide box office as of 2022. The original Jurassic Park was the first to surpass $1 billion, doing so during its 2013 re-release. This was followed by each installment in the Jurassic World trilogy.

== Background ==
=== Premise and dinosaurs ===
The Jurassic Park franchise focuses on genetically engineered dinosaurs running amok on an island theme park off the coast of Costa Rica. The dinosaurs are cloned by extracting ancient DNA from mosquitoes, which sucked the blood of dinosaurs and then became fossilized in amber, preserving the DNA. Scientists then fill gaps in the genome using frog DNA. Although the films primarily take place on fictional islands located in the Pacific coast of Central America, Jurassic World: Fallen Kingdom (2018) and Jurassic World Dominion (2022) see the dinosaurs relocated throughout the world, including the U.S. mainland.

The film series' recreation of dinosaurs was achieved primarily through animatronics and computer-generated imagery. The first film was praised for its dinosaur effects, and created an increased interest in the field of paleontology, while changing the public perception of dinosaurs with its modern portrayal.

The World trilogy largely ignored recent paleontological findings to maintain continuity with the Park trilogy, leading to criticism among paleontologists. Both Jurassic Park III and Jurassic World include a scene where a character states that any inaccuracies in the dinosaurs can be attributed to the fact that they are genetically-engineered animals. To better reflect modern discoveries, Jurassic World Dominion (2022) expanded upon the concept of feathered dinosaurs which was first introduced in Jurassic Park III (2001).

=== InGen ===
International Genetic Technologies, Inc. (InGen) is the fictional company responsible for cloning the dinosaurs. According to the novels, it is based in Palo Alto, California, and has one location in Europe as well. (Note: As described in the novels.) Nevertheless, most of InGen's research took place on the fictional islands of Isla Sorna and Isla Nublar, near Costa Rica. (Note: As described in the films, Jurassic Park and The Lost World: Jurassic Park.) While the first novel indicated InGen was just one of any number of small 1980s genetic engineering start-ups, the events of the novel and film revealed to a select group that InGen had discovered a method for cloning dinosaurs, which would be placed in an island theme park attraction.

InGen was well established in the first novel as the entity behind the park, but for simplicity the first film emphasized the Jurassic Park brand. The InGen name is visible in the film — on computer screens, helicopters, etc. — but is never spoken. InGen's corporate identity is more prominent in the second film. By the time that Jurassic World takes place, InGen and all its intellectual property have been subsidized by the Masrani Global Corporation. After InGen went defunct, it is revealed in Jurassic World Rebirth, that pharmaceutical company ParkerGenix had obtained InGen's files and dinosaur tracking systems for their agendas.

Beacham's Encyclopedia of Popular Fiction describes InGen as comparable to other "sleazy organizations". Other sources reference the company's receiving a baby T. rex (in The Lost World: Jurassic Park) as an allusion to other exploitative entrepreneurs depicted in the 1933 film King Kong. Ken Gelder describes InGen as "resolutely secretive", like the tax firm in John Grisham's 1991 novel The Firm.

=== Biosyn ===
In the novels, Biosyn Corporation (or Biosyn for short) is InGen's corporate rival, based in Cupertino, California. The company is controversial for its industrial espionage in the genetics industry. Lewis Dodgson, an employee of Biosyn, helps the company in its theft of corporate secrets. Biosyn is interested in acquiring InGen's dinosaur DNA, believing the animals present a variety of uses such as hunting trophies and pharmaceutical test subjects.

Dodgson makes only a minor appearance in the first film, and his employer is not named. However, Biosyn is featured in several video games. (Note: Biosyn appears in the 1994 video games Jurassic Park (for the Sega CD) and Jurassic Park 2: The Chaos Continues (for the Super NES). It is also referenced in the subsequent games Trespasser and Jurassic World Evolution.)

The company, as Biosyn Genetics, makes its film debut in Jurassic World Dominion (2022). By the time that the film takes place, Dodgson has become the company's CEO. Biosyn's employees now include geneticist Dr. Henry Wu and mathematician Dr. Ian Malcolm, the latter working as the company's in-house philosopher. With dinosaurs loose around the world and captured by governments, Biosyn has a contract to house the animals at its headquarters in the Dolomites mountain range in Italy. In addition to performing pharmaceutical research on the dinosaurs, the company has also captured 14-year-old orphan Maisie Lockwood and unleashed giant locusts to devour their rivals' crops. By the end of the film, this plot is foiled and exposed to the public. The film's director, Colin Trevorrow, described Biosyn not as an "evil" corporation, but rather an entity with thousands of employees who have the best intentions in mind, only to feel betrayed by Dodgson upon learning of his actions.

=== Isla Nublar ===
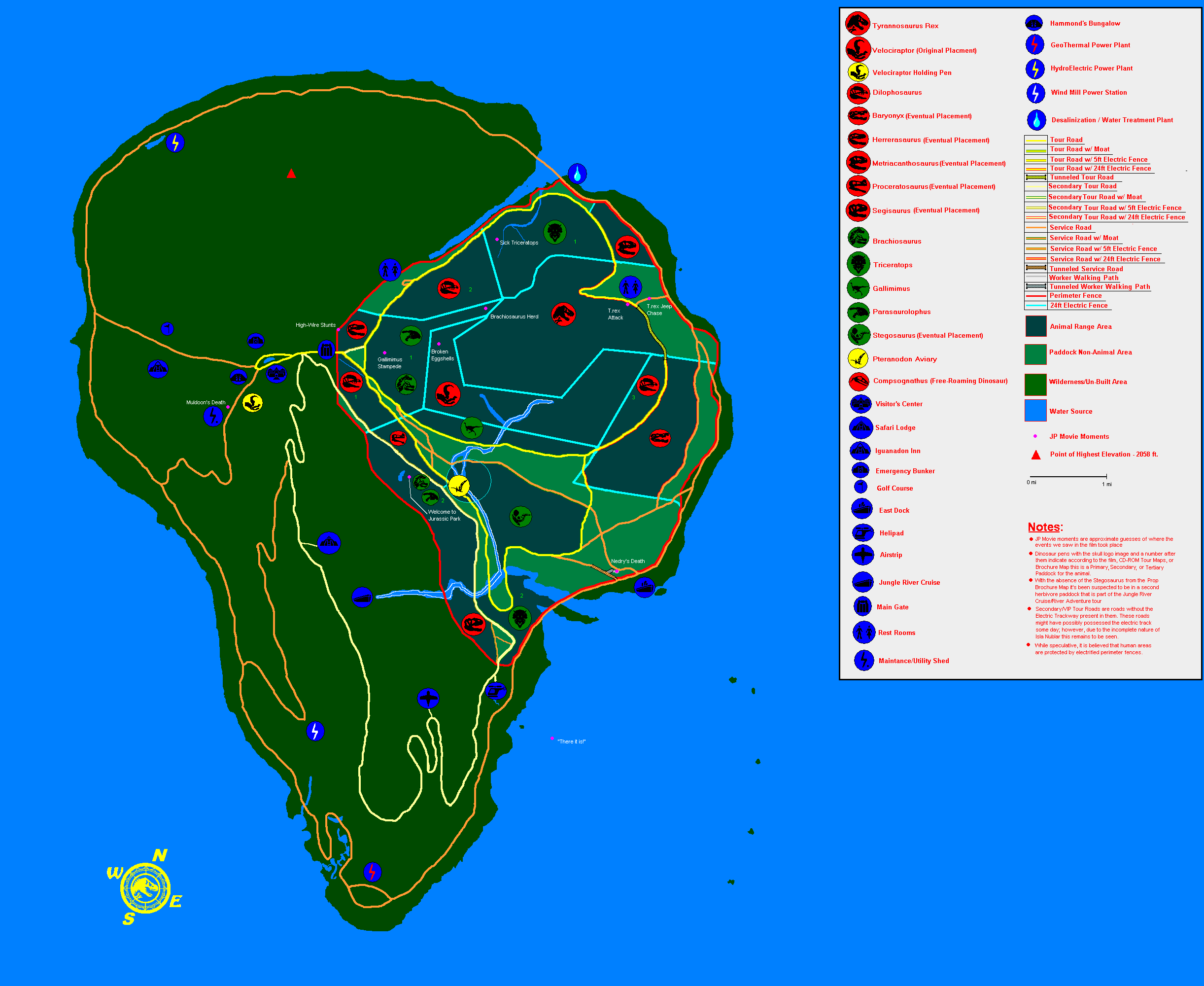
Fan-made map of Isla Nublar as presented in the film adaptation of Jurassic Park, reconciling various sources. The layouts differ in the novel, videogames and Jurassic World, but the overall shape of the island is always an inverted teardrop.

Isla Nublar (English: Cloud Island) is a fictional Central American island that serves as the main setting in the first novel and its film adaptation, as well as Jurassic World. According to the novel, its name means "Cloud Island" in Spanish. The tropical island is located 120 miles (190 kilometres) west of Costa Rica and has an inactive volcano. In the first novel and film, Isla Nublar is the location of Jurassic Park, a dinosaur theme park proposed by InGen, but it fails to open after the animals escape. In the novel, the Costa Rican government declares the island unsafe and has it napalmed; in the film series, the island continues to exist until the Jurassic World trilogy.

In Jurassic World, the theme park idea has been carried out successfully by Masrani Global Corporation. By the end of the film, however, the island is overrun by dinosaurs once more following the Indominus rex incident.

In Jurassic World: Fallen Kingdom, Isla Nublar is destroyed when its volcano becomes active again and erupts.

In the films, several Hawaiian islands stood in as Isla Nublar, including Oahu and Kauai. Some filming also took place on sound stages, in California for the original film, and in Louisiana for Jurassic World.

=== Isla Sorna ===
Isla Sorna (English: Sarcasm Island), also called Site B, is another fictional Central American island. It is 87 miles (140 km) southwest of Isla Nublar, and 207 miles (333 km) west of Costa Rica. It is the main setting for the second novel and its film adaptation, as well as the third film. Isla Sorna is where InGen conducted much of its dinosaur research. It is here that the dinosaurs were bred before being shipped off to Isla Nublar; a laboratory on the latter island was built only as a showroom for tourists. Isla Sorna is significantly larger than Isla Nublar and has various climates including tropical, highland tropical and temperate rainforest. It is part of a five-island chain known as Las Cinco Muertes (Spanish for "The Five Deaths"), although the other islands do not play a role in the novels or films. However, they are used as the main setting for the 2018 video game Jurassic World Evolution.

InGen abandons Isla Sorna after the events of the first novel and film, and the dinosaurs are left to live freely and reproduce. At the end of the second film, it is stated that Isla Sorna has been set up as a biological preserve for the animals, after a failed attempt to relocate them to a new theme park in San Diego. The status of Isla Sorna is not mentioned in Jurassic World, while a promotional website for Jurassic World: Fallen Kingdom states that the island ecosystem suffered a breakdown after illegally-cloned animals were introduced there. The surviving dinosaurs were relocated to Isla Nublar for the opening of the Jurassic World theme park, leaving Sorna abandoned. Jurassic World Dominion shows the two adult Tyrannosaurus from Isla Sorna encountering the Tyrannosaurus from Isla Nublar. In the same film, Ramsay Cole mentions that Isla Sorna's dinosaurs have been relocated to Biosyn's valley along with those from Isla Nublar that have been rounded up. The island briefly appears in video footage from 1986 shown to Maisie Lockwood by Henry Wu.

For the second film, Humboldt County, California served as the primary location for scenes set on Isla Sorna, giving it a forest climate. Filming also took place on sound stages at Universal Studios Hollywood, and a beach scene was shot on Kauai. The third film largely uses Oahu and Kauai to represent Isla Sorna, as the original film had done for Isla Nublar. A jungle set was also built on a sound stage at Universal Studios.

== Novels ==
=== Jurassic Park (1990) ===
In 1983, Michael Crichton originally conceived a screenplay about a pterosaur being cloned from fossil DNA. After wrestling with this idea for a while, he came up with the story of Jurassic Park. Crichton worked on the book for several years; he decided his first draft would have a theme park for the setting (similar to his 1973 film Westworld) and a young boy as the main character. Response was extremely negative, so Crichton rewrote the story to make it from an adult's point of view, which resulted in more positive feedback.

Steven Spielberg learned of the novel in October 1989 while he and Crichton were discussing a screenplay that would become the TV series ER. Warner Bros., Columbia Pictures, 20th Century Fox, and Universal Pictures bid for the rights to the novel before its publication. In May 1990, Universal acquired the rights, with the backing of Spielberg's Amblin Entertainment. Crichton put up a non-negotiable fee for $1.5 million as well as a substantial percentage of the gross. Universal further paid Crichton $500,000 to adapt his own novel (Malia Scotch Marmo, who was a writer on Spielberg's 1991 film Hook, wrote the next draft of Jurassic Park, but was not credited; David Koepp wrote the final draft, which left out much of the novel's exposition and violence, and made numerous changes to the characters). Universal desperately needed money to keep their company alive, and partially succeeded with Jurassic Park, as it became a critical and commercial success.

=== The Lost World (1995) ===
After the film adaptation of Jurassic Park was released to home video, Crichton was pressured from many sources for a sequel novel. Crichton declined all offers until Spielberg himself told him that he would be keen to direct a film adaptation of the sequel, if one were written. Crichton began work almost immediately and in 1995 published The Lost World. Crichton confirmed that his novel had elements taken from the novel of the same name by Sir Arthur Conan Doyle. The book was also an outstanding success, both with professional and amateur critics. The film adaptation, The Lost World: Jurassic Park, began production in September 1996.

=== Jurassic Park Adventures (2001–2002) ===
Scott Ciencin wrote a trilogy of spin-off novels based upon Jurassic Park III. The series contained Jurassic Park Adventures: Survivor and Jurassic Park Adventures: Prey, both released in 2001, and Jurassic Park Adventures: Flyers, released the following year.

=== The Evolution of Claire (2018) ===
The Evolution of Claire (Jurassic World) is a young adult novel written by Tess Sharpe. It is based upon the Jurassic World trilogy, and was released in 2018 in conjunction with the release of Jurassic World: Fallen Kingdom. It is a spin-off set in 2004, prior to the opening of the Jurassic World theme park. The novel is about college freshman Claire Dearing during her summer internship at the park.

=== Maisie Lockwood Adventures (2022) ===
Maisie Lockwood Adventures (Jurassic World) is a children's book series written by Tess Sharpe and illustrated by Chloe Dominique. It is based upon the Jurassic World trilogy, and was released in 2022 in conjunction with the release of Jurassic World Dominion. Consisting of the novels Off the Grid and The Yosemite Six, the novels tell the adventures of Maisie Lockwood as she navigates a world filled with dinosaurs both ferocious and friendly.

== Films ==
| Film | U.S. release date | Director | Screenwriter(s) | Story by | Producers |
|---|---|---|---|---|---|
| Jurassic Park | June 11, 1993 | Steven Spielberg | David Koepp & Michael Crichton | David Koepp & Michael Crichton | Gerald Molen & Kathleen Kennedy |
| The Lost World: Jurassic Park | May 23, 1997 | Steven Spielberg | David Koepp | David Koepp | Colin Wilson & Gerald Molen |
| Jurassic Park III | July 18, 2001 | Joe Johnston | Jim Taylor, Peter Buchman & Alexander Payne | Jim Taylor, Peter Buchman & Alexander Payne | Larry Franco & Kathleen Kennedy |
| Jurassic World | June 12, 2015 | Colin Trevorrow | Rick Jaffa, Amanda Silver, Derek Connolly & Colin Trevorrow | Rick Jaffa & Amanda Silver | Frank Marshall & Patrick Crowley |
| Jurassic World: Fallen Kingdom | June 22, 2018 | J. A. Bayona | Derek Connolly & Colin Trevorrow | Derek Connolly & Colin Trevorrow | Belén Atienza, Frank Marshall & Patrick Crowley |
| Jurassic World Dominion | June 10, 2022 | Colin Trevorrow | Colin Trevorrow & Emily Carmichael | Derek Connolly & Colin Trevorrow | Frank Marshall & Patrick Crowley |
| Jurassic World Rebirth | July 2, 2025 | Gareth Edwards | David Koepp | David Koepp | Frank Marshall & Patrick Crowley |
| Untitled eighth film | June 9, 2028 | J. A. Bayona | David Koepp | David Koepp | Steven Spielberg, Kathleen Kennedy, Frank Marshall & Patrick Crowley |

=== Overview ===
The films begin as an adaptation of Michael Crichton's 1990 novel with the film Jurassic Park. After an incident with a velociraptor in Jurassic Park on Isla Nublar, theme park owner John Hammond (Richard Attenborough) brings in three specialists to sign off on the park to calm investors. The specialists, paleontologist Alan Grant (Sam Neill), paleobotanist Ellie Sattler (Laura Dern), and chaos theorist Ian Malcolm (Jeff Goldblum), are surprised to see that the island park's main attraction are living, breathing dinosaurs, created with a mixture of fossilized DNA and genetic cross-breeding/cloning. When lead programmer Dennis Nedry (Wayne Knight) turns off the park's power to sneak out with samples of the dinosaur embryos to sell to a corporate rival, the dinosaurs break free, and the survivors are forced to find a way to turn the power back on and make it out alive. The film also stars Bob Peck, Martin Ferrero, BD Wong, Ariana Richards, Joseph Mazzello, and Samuel L. Jackson.

The Lost World is set on Isla Sorna, a secondary island where the animals were bred en masse and allowed to grow before being transported to the park on Isla Nublar. When a vacationing family stumbles upon the island's dinosaurs, Ian Malcolm (Jeff Goldblum) is called in by John Hammond to lead a team to document the island to turn it into a preserve, where the animals can roam free without interference from the outside world. Malcolm agrees to go when he discovers his girlfriend, paleontologist Sarah Harding (Julianne Moore) is already on the island, while at the same time Hammond's nephew, Peter Ludlow (Arliss Howard), has taken over his uncle's company and leads a team of hunters to capture the creatures and bring them back to a theme park in San Diego. The two groups clash and are ultimately forced to work together to evade the predatory creatures and survive the second island. The film also stars Pete Postlethwaite, Richard Schiff, Vince Vaughn, Vanessa Lee Chester, Peter Stormare, and a young Camilla Belle.

Jurassic Park III also takes place on Isla Sorna. When their son Eric (Trevor Morgan) goes missing while parasailing, the Kirbys (William H. Macy and Téa Leoni) hire Alan Grant (Sam Neill) under false pretenses to help them navigate the island. Believing it to be nothing more than sight-seeing, and that he will act as a dinosaur guide from the safety of their plane, he is startled to find them landing on the ground, where they are stalked by a Spinosaurus, which destroys their plane. As they search for the Kirbys' son, the situation grows dire as Velociraptors hunt their group and they must find a way off the island. The film also stars Alessandro Nivola, Michael Jeter, Mark Harelik, and Laura Dern.

Jurassic World features a new park built on the remains of the original park on Isla Nublar. The film sees the park run by Simon Masrani (Irrfan Khan) and Masrani Corp, and features the return of Dr. Henry Wu (BD Wong) from the first film. Chris Pratt and Bryce Dallas Howard star as the new leads Owen Grady and Claire Dearing, while Vincent D'Onofrio portrayed the main antagonist Vic Hoskins. The cast also includes Jake Johnson, Lauren Lapkus, Ty Simpkins, Nick Robinson, Omar Sy, Brian Tee, Katie McGrath, Andy Buckley, and Judy Greer. The primary dinosaur antagonist is Indominus rex, a genetically-modified hybrid of Tyrannosaurus rex and several other species, including Velociraptor, cuttlefish, tree frog, and pit viper. The Indominus Rex also features a chameleon-like camouflage ability, which was a plot element from the second Crichton novel unused in previous films.

In Fallen Kingdom, former Jurassic World manager Claire Dearing and velociraptor handler Owen Grady join a mission to relocate Isla Nublar's dinosaurs to a new island sanctuary to rescue them from a volcanic eruption. They discover that the mission is part of a scheme to sell the captured dinosaurs on the black market in order to fund his party's genetic research. The captured dinosaurs are brought to an estate in northern California, where several of the creatures are auctioned and subsequently shipped to their new owners. The Indoraptor, a new hybrid dinosaur, escapes and rampages though the estate, terrorizing the people there, Owen and Claire among them. A subplot about human cloning was introduced in the film. Fallen Kingdom, similar to the second installment, The Lost World, re-explores the themes about the aftermath of the dinosaur park's demise on Isla Nublar and dinosaurs being used for exploitation by humans.

Dominion is set four years after the events of Fallen Kingdom, with dinosaurs now living alongside humans around the world. It follows Owen Grady and Claire Dearing as they embark on a rescue mission, while Alan Grant and Ellie Sattler reunite with Ian Malcolm to expose a conspiracy by the genomics corporation Biosyn, a once rival of the defunct InGen.

Rebirth is set five years after the events of Dominion, when Earth's environment has largely proven inhospitable to the remaining populations of dinosaurs and other de-extinct prehistoric animals. The surviving creatures now reside in remote areas of the equatorial region, reminiscent of the environments where they once flourished. Zora Bennett (Johansson), a covert operative, is recruited by ParkerGenix, a pharmaceutical company, to collaborate with paleontologist Dr. Henry Loomis (Bailey) and team leader Duncan Kincaid (Ali) on a top-secret mission to infiltrate Ile Saint-Hubert, a forbidden island in the Atlantic Ocean, once used by InGen as a dinosaur research facility.

Jurassic Park story chronology
- Jurassic Park (1993)
- The Lost World: Jurassic Park (1997)
- Jurassic Park III (2001)
- Jurassic World (2015)
- Jurassic World Camp Cretaceous (2020–2022)
- Jurassic World: Fallen Kingdom (2018)
- Battle at Big Rock (2019)
- Jurassic World: Chaos Theory (2024–2025)
- Jurassic World Dominion (2022)
- Jurassic World Rebirth (2025)

=== Jurassic Park (1993) ===
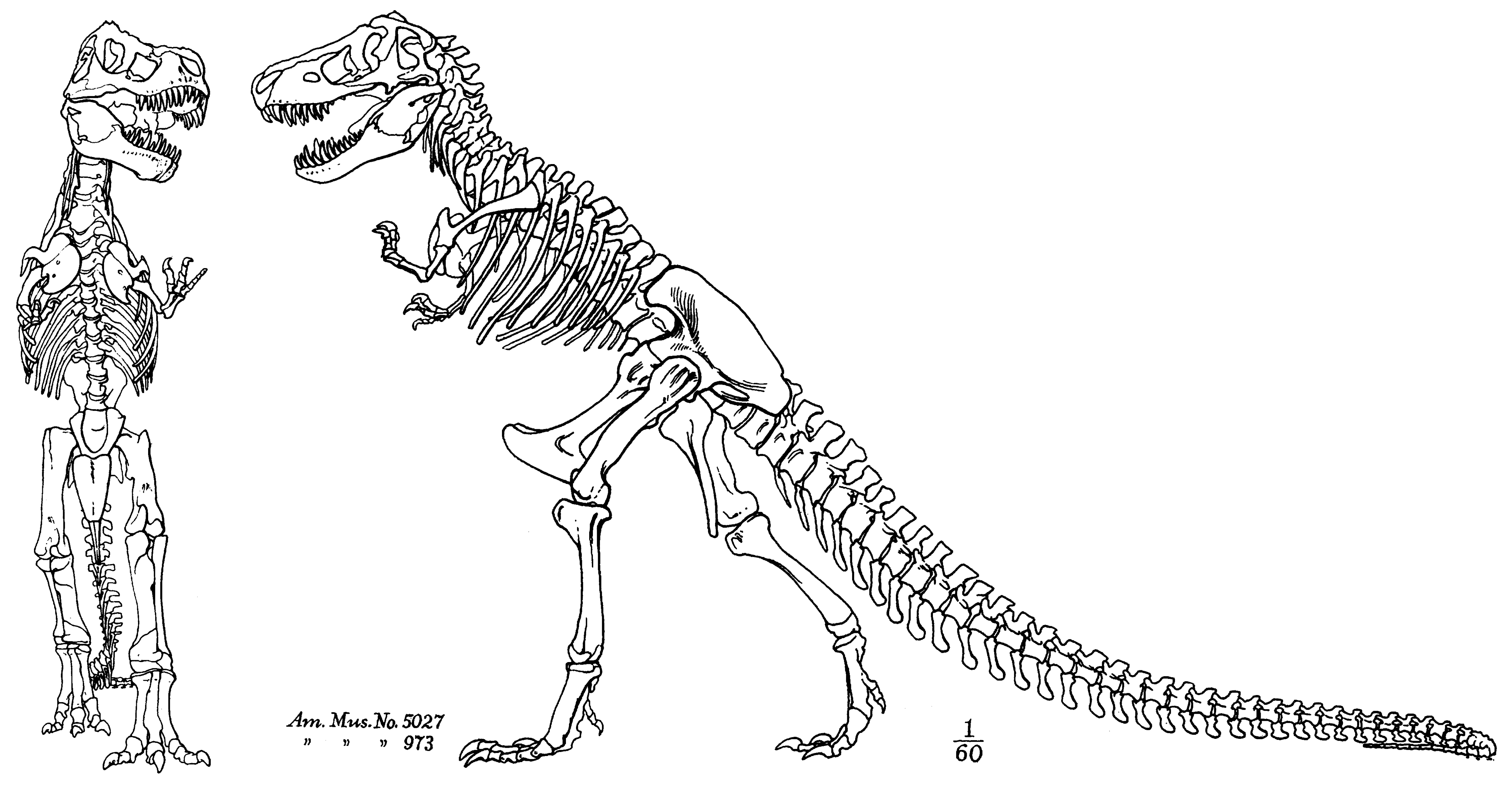
1917 skeletal diagram of Tyrannosaurus published by Henry Fairfield Osborn, which was the basis of the covers of Jurassic Park and The Lost World, and subsequently the logos of the films

Spielberg cited King Kong as the inspiration for the film stating "My one precedent for Jurassic Park was King Kong. King Kong was the high water mark for special effects creating a world I never knew existed". "And I think that was my high-water mark for imagining what it would be like to do a King Kong of today. Certainly I don't consider Jurassic Park a classic the way King Kong is a classic, but I was so inspired by King Kong that that was one of the reasons I wanted to make Jurassic Park"."

Spielberg cited Godzilla as an inspiration for Jurassic Park, specifically Godzilla, King of the Monsters! (1956), which he grew up watching. During production, Spielberg described Godzilla as "the most masterful of all the dinosaur movies because it made you believe it was really happening".

Jurassic Park's biggest impact on subsequent films was a result of its breakthrough use of computer-generated imagery. The film is regarded as a landmark for visual effects. It received positive reviews from critics, who praised the effects, though reactions to other elements of the picture, such as character development, were mixed. During its release, the film grossed more than $914 million worldwide, becoming the most successful film released up to that time (surpassing E.T. the Extra-Terrestrial and surpassed four years later by Titanic), and it is currently the 17th highest grossing feature film (taking inflation into account, it is the 20th-highest-grossing film in North America). It is the most financially successful film for NBCUniversal and Steven Spielberg.

Recently, Jurassic Park has been proposed to be recognized as Intangible Geoheritage due to its cultural impact on the people's views about dinosaurs, including a change in the popular iconography of carnivorous dinosaurs.

Jurassic Park had two re-releases: The first on September 23, 2011, in the United Kingdom and the second in which it was converted into 3D on April 5, 2013, for its 20th anniversary, which resulted in the film passing the $1 billion mark at the worldwide box office. In 2018, the film was selected for preservation in the United States National Film Registry by the Library of Congress as being "culturally, historically, or aesthetically significant".

=== The Lost World: Jurassic Park (1997) ===
Before The Lost World was published, a film adaptation was already in pre-production, with its release occurring in May 1997. The film was a commercial success, breaking many box-office records when released. The film was released to mixed reviews, similar to its predecessor in terms of characterization. Critical response to The Lost World has since become more favorable, with some publications calling it the best Jurassic Park sequel. Much like the first film, The Lost World: Jurassic Park made a number of changes to the plot and characters from the book, replacing the corporate rivals with an internal power struggle and changing the roles or characterizations of several protagonists.

=== Jurassic Park III (2001) ===
Joe Johnston had been interested in directing the sequel to Jurassic Park and approached his friend Steven Spielberg about the project. While Spielberg wanted to direct the first sequel, he agreed that if there was ever a third film, Johnston could direct. Spielberg, nevertheless, stayed involved in this film by becoming its executive producer. Production began on August 30, 2000, with filming in California, and the Hawaiian islands of Kauai, Oahu, and Molokai. It is the first Jurassic Park film not to be based on a novel, although it does incorporate some unused plot elements from the Crichton novels, such as the river escape and the pterosaur aviary. Jurassic Park III had a troubled production, and received mixed reviews from critics.

=== Jurassic World (2015) ===
Steven Spielberg devised a story idea for a fourth film in 2001, during production of Jurassic Park III. In 2002, William Monahan was hired to write the script, with the film's release scheduled for 2005. Early aspects of the plot included dinosaurs escaping to the mainland, and an army of genetically modified dinosaur-human mercenaries. Monahan finished the first draft of the script in 2003. Sam Neill and Richard Attenborough were set to reprise their characters, while Keira Knightley was in talks for two separate roles. In 2004, John Sayles wrote two drafts of the script. Sayles' first draft involved a team of Deinonychus being trained for use in rescue missions.

Both drafts were scrapped, and a new script was being worked on in 2006. Laura Dern was contacted to reprise her role, with the film expected for release in 2008. The film was further delayed by the 2007–08 Writers Guild of America strike. Mark Protosevich wrote two film treatments in 2011, which were rejected. Rise of the Planet of the Apes screenwriters Rick Jaffa and Amanda Silver were hired in 2012 to write an early draft of the script. In 2013, Colin Trevorrow was announced as a director and co-writer, with the film scheduled for release on June 12, 2015. The film was shot in Univisium 2.00:1.

Jurassic World received generally positive reviews. It was the first film ever to gross over $500 million worldwide in its opening weekend, and grossed over $1.6 billion through the course of its theatrical run, making it the world's third highest-grossing film at the time. It became the second highest-grossing film of 2015, and remains the ninth highest-grossing film of all time. When adjusted for monetary inflation, Jurassic World is the highest-grossing film in the franchise.

=== Jurassic World: Fallen Kingdom (2018) ===
A sequel to Jurassic World was released on June 22, 2018. The film was directed by J. A. Bayona and written by Trevorrow and Connolly, with Trevorrow and Spielberg as executive producers. The film stars Chris Pratt, Bryce Dallas Howard, Rafe Spall, Justice Smith, Daniella Pineda, James Cromwell, Toby Jones, Ted Levine, BD Wong, Isabella Sermon, and Geraldine Chaplin, with Jeff Goldblum reprising his role as Dr. Ian Malcolm.

During early conversations on Jurassic World, Spielberg told Trevorrow that he was interested in having several more films made. In April 2014, Trevorrow announced that sequels to Jurassic World had been discussed: "We wanted to create something that would be a little bit less arbitrary and episodic, and something that could potentially arc into a series that would feel like a complete story". Trevorrow, who said he would direct the film if asked, later told Spielberg that he would only focus on directing one film in the series. Trevorrow believed that different directors could bring different qualities to future films. Bayona was once considered to direct Jurassic World, but he declined as he felt there was not enough time for production. Filming took place from February to July 2017, in the United Kingdom and Hawaii.

Fallen Kingdom grossed over $1.3 billion, making it the third Jurassic film to pass the billion-dollar mark. It is the third highest-grossing film of 2018, and the 22nd highest-grossing film of all time. It received mixed reviews from critics.

=== Jurassic World Dominion (2022) ===
Jurassic World Dominion was released on June 10, 2022. It was directed by Trevorrow, with a screenplay written by him and Emily Carmichael, based on a story by Trevorrow and Connolly. Trevorrow and Spielberg serve as executive producers for the film, with Frank Marshall and Patrick Crowley as producers. The film stars Chris Pratt and Bryce Dallas Howard, returning from the previous Jurassic World films. Sam Neill, Laura Dern and Jeff Goldblum also reprise their characters for major roles, marking the trio's first film appearance together since the original Jurassic Park film. In addition, Daniella Pineda, Justice Smith, Isabella Sermon, and Omar Sy reprise their roles from the previous two films. Other actors include Mamoudou Athie, DeWanda Wise, Dichen Lachman, and Scott Haze. Campbell Scott portrays the character Lewis Dodgson from the first film, originally played by Cameron Thor.

Planning for the film dates to 2014. Trevorrow and Carmichael were writing the script as of April 2018. Trevorrow said the film would focus on the dinosaurs that went open source after being sold and spread around the world in Jurassic World: Fallen Kingdom, allowing people other than Dr. Henry Wu to create their own dinosaurs. Trevorrow stated that the film would be set around the world, and said that the idea of Henry Wu being the only person who knows how to create a dinosaur was far-fetched "after 30 years of this technology existing" within the films' universe. Additionally, the film would focus on the dinosaurs that were freed at the end of Jurassic World: Fallen Kingdom, but it would not depict dinosaurs terrorizing cities and going to war against humans; Trevorrow considered such ideas unrealistic. Instead, Trevorrow was interested in a world where "dinosaur interaction is unlikely but possible—the same way we watch out for bears or sharks". Certain scenes and ideas regarding the integration of dinosaurs into the world were ultimately removed from the Jurassic World: Fallen Kingdom script to be saved for the third film.

Filming locations included Canada, England's Pinewood Studios, and the country of Malta. Jurassic World Dominion began filming in February 2020, but was put on hiatus several weeks later as a safety precaution due to the COVID-19 pandemic. Production later resumed that July, with numerous health precautions in place, including COVID-19 testing and social distancing. Filming wrapped four months later. Jurassic World Dominion uses more animatronics than the previous films. The animatronic dinosaurs were created by John Nolan and his team. It is also the second film in the franchise to feature feathered dinosaurs after feathered velociraptors in Jurassic Park III.

Dominion grossed over $1 billion, becoming the third highest-grossing film of 2022, and the fourth in the franchise to pass the billion-dollar mark. It received mixed-to-negative reviews from critics. An extended version of Jurassic World Dominion was released on 4K Ultra HD, Blu-ray and DVD on August 16, 2022. The extended edition received more favorable reviews and is considered an improvement over the theatrical cut.

=== Jurassic World Rebirth (2025) ===
Jurassic World Dominion concluded the second film trilogy as well as the storyline that began in the original trilogy, although future films in the franchise were not ruled out. Marshall said in May 2020 that Jurassic World Dominion would mark "the start of a new era", in which humans have to adjust to dinosaurs being on the mainland. Marshall reiterated in January 2022 that there could be more films: "We're going to sit down, and we're going to see what the future is".

Trevorrow, noting that he spent nine years working on the Jurassic World trilogy, said in May 2022 that he would likely not return for another film, except in a possible advisory role. He expressed interest in having Howard direct a future film. He also suggested that several characters introduced in Dominion could return for future installments, including Kayla Watts (portrayed by DeWanda Wise), Ramsay Cole (Mamoudou Athie), and Soyona Santos (Dichen Lachman). Pratt and Howard do not expect to reprise their roles again, and Neill said Dominion would be the last film for Dern, Goldblum and himself.

In January 2024, a new installment was revealed to be officially in development. The film was released on July 2, 2025. David Koepp returned as screenwriter, while Frank Marshall and Patrick Crowley once again serve as producers. Steven Spielberg will serve as executive producer on the project, a joint-venture production between Amblin Entertainment and Universal.

Development of the project had been underway for some time prior to its announcement. The film was directed by Gareth Edwards. It stars Scarlett Johansson, Mahershala Ali, and Jonathan Bailey with Rupert Friend, Manuel Garcia-Rulfo, Luna Blaise, and David Iacono. Filming took place in Thailand, Malta and the U.K.

It received mixed reviews from critics. The film was a box office success having grossed over $872 million worldwide, becoming the sixth highest-grossing film of 2025.

=== Untitled eighth film ===
In May 2026, it was announced that a sequel to Rebirth was in development. In August that year, Gareth Edwards' departure from the sequel was announced. He had left the project due to "creative differences". In October 2026, J. A. Bayona was reported to be in consideration to direct the sequel, after previously directing Jurassic World: Fallen Kingdom. Principal photography is expected to begin in 2027.

== Short films ==
As of 2022, two short films have been released. Both take place between Jurassic World: Fallen Kingdom and Jurassic World Dominion, and are considered canon with the film series.

| Film | U.S. release date | Director | Screenwriters | Producers |
|---|---|---|---|---|
| Battle at Big Rock | September 15, 2019 | Colin Trevorrow | Emily Carmichael and Colin Trevorrow | Patrick Crowley and Frank Marshall |
| Jurassic World Dominion prologue | November 23, 2021 | Colin Trevorrow | Emily Carmichael and Colin Trevorrow | Patrick Crowley and Frank Marshall |

=== Battle at Big Rock (2019) ===
Battle at Big Rock is the first live-action short film in the franchise, and was released on September 15, 2019. The eight-minute film was directed by Colin Trevorrow, and was co-written by him and Emily Carmichael. The film stars André Holland, Natalie Martinez, Melody Hurd, and Pierson Salvador.

The film is set one year after the events of Jurassic World: Fallen Kingdom. In the film, a family goes on a camping trip at the fictional Big Rock National Park in northern California, approximately 20 miles (30 km) from where dinosaurs from Fallen Kingdom were let loose. The film chronicles the first major confrontation between humans and the dinosaurs.

=== Jurassic World Dominion prologue (2021) ===
A five-minute Jurassic World Dominion prologue was released in 2021, serving as the franchise's second live-action short film. It was originally intended as the film's opening sequence before being removed from the final cut. It features a prehistoric segment showcasing dinosaurs in their natural habitats, then cuts to the present day as a T. rex wreaks havoc at a drive-in theater. The prologue is used as the opening sequence in the extended edition of Jurassic World Dominion.

== Television ==
=== Lego animated projects ===
Lego produced various CGI-animated projects, including the two-part television special Lego Jurassic World: The Secret Exhibit, which aired on NBC on November 29, 2018. A 13-episode miniseries, Lego Jurassic World: Legend of Isla Nublar, premiered in 2019. It was broadcast on Family Channel in Canada and on Nickelodeon in the U.S.

=== Jurassic World Camp Cretaceous (2020–2022) ===
Jurassic World Camp Cretaceous is a CGI-animated series that premiered globally on Netflix on September 18, 2020. It ran for five seasons and 49 episodes, concluding on July 21, 2022. It is a joint project between Netflix, Universal Studios, Amblin Entertainment and DreamWorks Animation. Scott Kreamer and Lane Lueras are the showrunners, and executive produce the series with Spielberg, Marshall, and Trevorrow, while Zack Stentz serves as consulting producer. The series is set during the events of Jurassic World and the opening scenes of Jurassic World: Fallen Kingdom, and is about six teenagers attending an adventure camp on Isla Nublar. When the park's dinosaurs escape, the teenagers are stranded and must work together to escape the island. The voice cast includes Paul-Mikél Williams, Jenna Ortega, Ryan Potter, Raini Rodriguez, Sean Giambrone, Kausar Mohammed, Jameela Jamil, and Glen Powell. An interactive special, titled Hidden Adventure, debuted a few months after the series ended.

=== Jurassic World: Chaos Theory (2024–2025) ===
Jurassic World: Chaos Theory, an animated sequel series to Camp Cretaceous, was released on Netflix on May 24, 2024. It ran for four seasons and 39 episodes, concluding on November 20, 2025. It is set before and during the events of Jurassic World Dominion. Most of the voice actors reprised their roles, although Potter and Ortega were recast.

=== Future series ===
==== Jurassic World: Explorers (TBA) ====
Jurassic World: Explorers is an upcoming preschool children's animated series based on the Jurassic World trilogy.

==== Untitled live-action series ====
A live-action television series based on the Jurassic World trilogy was reportedly in development as of March 2020. However, Marshall said two years later that such a series had not been discussed, and that his focus was on the films. Speaking about Camp Cretaceous, Marshall said: "I think that's plenty for now".

=== Cancelled projects ===
==== Escape from Jurassic Park ====
In June 1993, after the theatrical release of Jurassic Park, spokesmen for Amblin and MCA confirmed that an animated series based on the film was in development and awaiting Spielberg's final approval. The series, titled Escape from Jurassic Park, would have consisted of 23 episodes for its first season. The series would have centered on John Hammond's attempts to finish Jurassic Park and open it to the public, while InGen's corporate rival Biosyn is simultaneously planning to open their own dinosaur theme park in Brazil, which ultimately ends with their dinosaurs escaping into the jungles.

If produced, it was believed that the project would be the most expensive animated series up to that time. Jeff Segal, president of Universal Cartoon Studios, said: "We are developing a TV series that we anticipate would be computer animated and very sophisticated. However, Spielberg has not had a chance yet to look at either the material or the format for the series". Segal said Universal was considering the possibility of developing the series for prime time, also commenting about the series' storyline: "It would essentially pick up from the closing moments of the movie and it would continue the story in a very dramatic way. The intention would be to continue with the primary characters and also introduce new characters". Segal also said the series would be aimed specifically at the same target audience as the film, while hoping that it would also appeal to young children.

Animation veteran and comic artist Will Meugniot (then working at Universal Cartoon Studios for various projects, including Exosquad) contacted artist William Stout to ask if he would be interested in designing the animated series. According to Stout: "This was not going to be a kiddy show (although kids of all ages, including myself, could enjoy it). They wanted the show to be a mature prime time series with top writers and state-of-the-art television animation augmented with quite a bit of CG animation". Universal Animation Studios wanted the show to have the look of a graphic novel.

Stout was hired to work on the series and subsequently made a trailer to demonstrate how the series would look, and how it would combine traditional animation with computer animation. The series required Spielberg's final approval before it could go into production. However, Spielberg had grown tired of the massive promotion and merchandise revolving around the film, and never watched the trailer. On July 13, 1993, Margaret Loesch, president of the Fox Children's Network, confirmed that discussions had been held with Spielberg about an animated version of the film. Loesch also said: "At least for now and in the foreseeable future, there will not be an animated Jurassic Park. That's Steven Spielberg's decision, and we respect that decision".

==== Jurassic Park: Chaos Effect ====
Part three of the four-part comic adaptation of The Lost World: Jurassic Park, published by Topps Comics in July 1997, confirmed to readers that a cartoon series based on the film was in development. It was commissioned by Spielberg and would be developed by DreamWorks Animation. In November 1997, it was reported that the cartoon would be accompanied by Jurassic Park: Chaos Effect, a series of dinosaur toys produced by Kenner and based on a premise that scientists had created dinosaur hybrids consisting of DNA from different creatures. The new toys were based on the upcoming cartoon. It was also reported that the cartoon could be ready by March 1998, as a mid-season replacement. The Chaos Effect toyline was released in June 1998, but the animated series was never produced, for unknown reasons.

== Motion comics and web series ==
=== Jurassic World (Motion Comics) (2019) ===
In late 2019, a Jurassic World motion comic series was released by Universal on YouTube. The four-part series is set after the events of Jurassic World: Fallen Kingdom and explores various dinosaur attacks throughout the world.

=== Employee Orientation Series: Presented by InGen (2023) ===
The Employee Orientation Series: Presented by InGen is an in-universe set of employee training tapes. There are currently three episodes, each around one minute long. They were released for the 30th anniversary of Jurassic Park.

== Cast and crew ==
List indicators

This section includes characters who will appear or have appeared in the franchise.

- An empty grey cell indicates the character was not in the film, or that the character's official presence has not yet been confirmed.
- ^{C} indicates a cameo role.
- ^{O} indicates an older version of the character.
- ^{P} indicates an appearance in onscreen photographs.
- ^{V} indicates a voice-only role.

=== Film cast ===
Characters
| Characters | Films | | | | | | |
| Characters | Jurassic Park | The Lost World: Jurassic Park | Jurassic Park III | Jurassic World | Jurassic World: Fallen Kingdom | Jurassic World Dominion | Jurassic World Rebirth |
| Characters | 1993 | 1997 | 2001 | 2015 | 2018 | 2022 | 2025 |
|---|---|---|---|---|---|---|---|
| Dr. Alan Grant | Sam Neill | | Sam Neill | | | Sam Neill | |
| Dr. Ellie Sattler | Laura Dern | | Laura Dern | | | Laura Dern | |
| Dr. Ian Malcolm | Jeff Goldblum | Jeff Goldblum | | Jeff Goldblum^{P} | Jeff Goldblum^{C} | Jeff Goldblum | |
| Dr. John Hammond | Richard Attenborough | Richard Attenborough | | | Richard Attenborough^{P} | | |
| Lex Murphy | Ariana Richards | Ariana Richards^{C} | | | | | |
| Tim Murphy | Joseph Mazzello | Joseph Mazzello^{C} | | | | | |
| Dr. Henry Wu | BD Wong | | | BD Wong | BD Wong | BD Wong | |
| Dennis Nedry | Wayne Knight | | | | | | |
| Dr. Lewis Dodgson | Cameron Thor | | | | | Campbell Scott | |
| Mr. DNA | Greg Burson^{V} | | | Colin Trevorrow^{V} | | | |
| Robert Muldoon | Bob Peck | | | | | | |
| Donald Gennaro | Martin Ferrero | | | | | | |
| Ray Arnold | Samuel L. Jackson | | | | | | |
| Dr. Harding | Jerry Molen | | | | | | |
| Dr. Sarah Harding | | Julianne Moore | | | | | |
| Kelly Curtis | | Vanessa Lee Chester | | | | | |
| Nick Van Owen | | Vince Vaughn | | | | | |
| Eddie Carr | | Richard Schiff | | | | | |
| Roland Tembo | | Pete Postlethwaite | | | | | |
| Peter Ludlow | | Arliss Howard | | | | | |
| Ajay Sidhu | | Harvey Jason | | | | | |
| Dr. Robert Burke | | Thomas F. Duffy | | | | | |
| Dieter Stark | | Peter Stormare | | | | | |
| Carter | | Thomas Rosales Jr. | | | | | |
| Paul Kirby | | | William H. Macy | | | | |
| Amanda Kirby | | | Téa Leoni | | | | |
| Billy Brennan | | | Alessandro Nivola | | | | |
| Eric Kirby | | | Trevor Morgan | | | | |
| Udesky | | | Michael Jeter | | | | |
| Nash | | | Bruce A. Young | | | | |
| Cooper | | | John Diehl | | | | |
| Charlie | | | Blake Bryan | | | | |
| Ben Hildebrand | | | Mark Harelik | | | | |
| Owen Grady | | | | Chris Pratt | Chris Pratt | Chris Pratt | |
| Claire Dearing | | | | Bryce Dallas Howard | Bryce Dallas Howard | Bryce Dallas Howard | |
| Gray Mitchell | | | | Ty Simpkins | | | |
| Zach Mitchell | | | | Nick Robinson | | | |
| Simon Masrani | | | | Irrfan Khan | | | |
| Vic Hoskins | | | | Vincent D'Onofrio | | | |
| Barry Sembène | | | | Omar Sy | | Omar Sy | |
| Lowery | | | | Jake Johnson | | Jake Johnson^{P} | |
| Vivian | | | | Lauren Lapkus | | Lauren Lapkus^{P} | |
| Karen Mitchell | | | | Judy Greer | | | |
| Scott Mitchell | | | | Andy Buckley | | | |
| Zara | | | | Katie McGrath | | | |
| Franklin Webb | | | | | Justice Smith | Justice Smith | |
| Dr. Zia Rodriguez | | | | | Daniella Pineda | Daniella Pineda^{C} | |
| Maisie Lockwood | | | | | Isabella Sermon | Isabella Sermon | |
| Charlotte Lockwood | | | | | Isabella Sermon^{P} | Isabella Sermon Elva Trill^{O} | |
| Iris | | | | | Geraldine Chaplin | Geraldine Chaplin^{P} | |
| Sir Benjamin Lockwood | | | | | James Cromwell | | |
| Eli Mills | | | | | Rafe Spall | | |
| Ken Wheatley | | | | | Ted Levine | | |
| Mr. Eversoll | | | | | Toby Jones | | |
| Ramsay Cole | | | | | | Mamoudou Athie | |
| Kayla Watts | | | | | | DeWanda Wise | |
| Soyona Santos | | | | | | Dichen Lachman | |
| Rainn Delacourt | | | | | | Scott Haze | |
| Zora Bennett | | | | | | | Scarlett Johansson |
| Dr. Henry Loomis | | | | | | | Jonathan Bailey |
| Duncan Kincaid | | | | | | | Mahershala Ali |
| Martin Krebs | | | | | | | Rupert Friend |
| Reuben Delgado | | | | | | | Manuel Garcia-Rulfo |
| Teresa Delgado | | | | | | | Luna Blaise |
| Xavier Dobbs | | | | | | | David Iacono |
| Isabella Delgado | | | | | | | Audrina Miranda |
| Nina | | | | | | | Philippine Velge |
| Leclerc | | | | | | | Bechir Sylvain |
| Bobby Atwater | | | | | | | Ed Skrein |

=== Television cast ===
| Characters | Lego Jurassic World: Legend of Isla Nublar | Jurassic World Camp Cretaceous | Jurassic World: Chaos Theory |
| Characters | 2019 | 2020–2022 | 2024–2025 |
|---|---|---|---|
| Owen Grady | Ian Hanlin^{V} | | Appears^{C} |
| Claire Dearing | Britt McKillip^{V} | | |
| Simon Masrani | Dhirendra^{V} | | |
| Vic Hoskins | Alex Zahara^{V} | | |
| Dr. Henry Wu | Vincent Tong^{V} | Greg Chun^{V} | Greg Chun^{V} |
| Allison Miles | Bethany Brown^{V} | | |
| Danny Nedermeyer | Adrian Petriw^{V} | | |
| Sinjin Prescott | Andrew Kavadas^{V} | | |
| Larson Mitchell | Kirby Morrow^{V} | | |
| Hudson Harper | Nicholas Holmes^{V} | | |
| Dianne | Patricia Drake^{V} | | |
| Dennis Nedry | William Kuklis^{V} | | |
| Darius Bowman | | Paul-Mikél Williams^{V} | Paul-Mikél Williams^{V} |
| Ben Pincus | | Sean Giambrone^{V} | Sean Giambrone^{V} |
| Yasmina "Yaz" Fadoula | | Kausar Mohammed^{V} | Kausar Mohammed^{V} |
| Brooklynn | | Jenna Ortega^{V} | Kiersten Kelly^{V} |
| Kenji Kon | | Ryan Potter^{V} | Darren Barnet^{V} |
| Sammy Gutierrez | | Raini Rodriguez^{V} | Raini Rodriguez^{V} |
| Lewis Dodgson | | Adam Harrington^{V} | Adam Harrington^{V} |
| Soyona Santos | | | Dichen Lachman^{V} |
| Barry Sembène | | | Evan Michael Lee^{V} |

=== Additional film crew ===
| Role | Jurassic Park | The Lost World: Jurassic Park | Jurassic Park III | Jurassic World | Jurassic World: Fallen Kingdom | Jurassic World Dominion | Jurassic World Rebirth |
| Role | 1993 | 1997 | 2001 | 2015 | 2018 | 2022 | 2025 |
|---|---|---|---|---|---|---|---|
| Composer | John Williams | John Williams | Score by: Don Davis Themes by: John Williams | Score by: Michael Giacchino Themes by: John Williams | Score by: Michael Giacchino Themes by: John Williams | Score by: Michael Giacchino Themes by: John Williams | Score by: Alexandre Desplat Themes by: John Williams |
| Editor | Michael Kahn | Michael Kahn | Robert Dalva | Kevin Stitt | Bernat Vilaplana | Mark Sanger | Jabez Olssen |
| Cinematographer | Dean Cundey | Janusz Kamiński | Shelly Johnson | John Schwartzman | Óscar Faura | John Schwartzman | John Mathieson |
| Production designer | Rick Carter | Rick Carter | Edward Verreaux | Edward Verreaux | Andy Nicholson | Kevin Jenkins | James Clyne |
| Runtime | 127 minutes | 129 minutes | 92 minutes | 124 minutes | 128 minutes | 147 minutes | 133 minutes |
| Production companies | Amblin Entertainment | Amblin Entertainment | Amblin Entertainment | Amblin Entertainment; Legendary Entertainment; The Kennedy/Marshall Company | Amblin Entertainment; Legendary Entertainment; Perfect World Pictures; The Kennedy/Marshall Company | Amblin Entertainment; Perfect World Pictures; The Kennedy/Marshall Company | Amblin Entertainment; The Kennedy/Marshall Company |
| Distributor | Universal Pictures | Universal Pictures | Universal Pictures | Universal Pictures | Universal Pictures | Universal Pictures | Universal Pictures |

== Reception ==
=== Box office performance ===
| Film | U.S. release date | Box office gross | | | All-time ranking | | Budget | Ref. |
| Film | U.S. release date | U.S. and Canada | Other territories | Worldwide | U.S. and Canada | Worldwide | Budget | Ref. |
|---|---|---|---|---|---|---|---|---|
| Jurassic Park | June 11, 1993 | $415,404,543 | $643,049,687 | $1,058,454,230 | 50 | 39 | $56–63 million | |
| The Lost World: Jurassic Park | May 23, 1997 | $229,086,679 | $389,552,320 | $618,638,999 | 186 | 190 | $73–75 million | |
| Jurassic Park III | July 18, 2001 | $181,171,875 | $187,608,934 | $368,780,809 | 303 | 435 | $93 million | |
| Jurassic World | June 12, 2015 | $653,406,625 | $1,018,130,819 | $1,671,537,444 | 10 | 10 | $150–215 million | |
| Jurassic World: Fallen Kingdom | June 22, 2018 | $417,719,760 | $890,603,542 | $1,308,323,302 | 41 | 23 | $170–606.3 million | |
| Jurassic World Dominion | June 10, 2022 | $376,851,080 | $627,153,512 | $1,004,004,592 | 60 | 58 | $185–683.7 million | |
| Jurassic World Rebirth | July 2, 2025 | $339,640,400 | $532,806,116 | $872,446,516 | 88 | 101 | $180–254.2 million | |
| Total | | $2,613,280,962 | $4,288,904,930 | $6,902,185,892 | 10 | 11 | $907 million–1.990 billion | |

=== Critical and public response ===
| Film | Critical | | Public |
| Film | Rotten Tomatoes | Metacritic | CinemaScore |
|---|---|---|---|
| Jurassic Park | 91% (203 reviews) | 68 (21 critics) | A |
| The Lost World: Jurassic Park | 57% (153 reviews) | 59 (18 critics) | B+ |
| Jurassic Park III | 49% (223 reviews) | 42 (30 critics) | B− |
| Jurassic World | 72% (360 reviews) | 59 (49 critics) | A |
| Jurassic World: Fallen Kingdom | 47% (431 reviews) | 51 (59 critics) | A− |
| Jurassic World Dominion | 28% (405 reviews) | 38 (60 critics) | A− |
| Jurassic World Rebirth | 50% (406 reviews) | 50 (55 critics) | B |

=== Accolades ===
| Award | Category | Film | | |
| Award | Category | Jurassic Park | The Lost World: Jurassic Park | Jurassic World Rebirth |
|---|---|---|---|---|
| Academy Award | Sound Editing | Won | | |
| Academy Award | Sound Mixing | Won | | |
| Academy Award | Visual Effects | Won | Nominated | Nominated |
| Grammy Award | Best Score Soundtrack | Nominated | Nominated | |

== Music ==
| Title | Release date | Length | Composer(s) | Label |
|---|---|---|---|---|
| Jurassic Park: Original Motion Picture Soundtrack | May 25, 1993 | 1:13:13 | John Williams | MCA, La-La Land |
| The Lost World: Jurassic Park (Original Motion Picture Score) | April 30, 1997 | 1:13:15 | John Williams | MCA, La-La Land |
| Jurassic Park III: Original Motion Picture Soundtrack | June 12, 2001 | 54:31 | Don Davis | Decca, La-La Land |
| Jurassic World: Original Motion Picture Soundtrack | June 9, 2015 | 1:17:05 | Michael Giacchino | Back Lot Music |
| Jurassic World: Fallen Kingdom (Original Motion Picture Soundtrack) | June 15, 2018 | 1:19:54 | Michael Giacchino | Back Lot Music |
| Jurassic World Dominion (Original Motion Picture Soundtrack) | June 3, 2022 | 1:47:00 | Michael Giacchino | Back Lot Music |
| Jurassic World Rebirth (Original Motion Picture Soundtrack) | July 2, 2025 | 1:41:46 | Alexandre Desplat | Back Lot Music |

== Merchandise and other media ==
=== Toys ===
For the 1993 film, Kenner produced a line of action figures and dinosaurs, marketed with the slogan, "If it's not 'Jurassic Park', it's extinct". Paleontologist Jack Horner, who offered his advice for the film's dinosaurs, was also hired as a scientific advisor for the dinosaur toys. Kenner had two years to develop the toys, which sold successfully. Dakin also produced stuffed dinosaurs based on the film.

Kenner produced another toy line for the 1997 sequel. The company also released Jurassic Park: Chaos Effect a year later. The toy line's premise involved scientists who had created new dinosaur species by combining the DNA of existing dinosaurs.

Kenner's parent company, Hasbro, took over toy production for Jurassic Park III, released in 2001. At that time, Playskool also released a toy line aimed at young children, under the name Jurassic Park Junior. Jurassic Park III toys were also released under the Lego Studios brand. Hasbro also created a toy line for Jurassic World. Some of the toy dinosaurs had been referred to on packaging as males, despite being females in the film. This drew some criticism which accused Hasbro of catering solely to a male demographic. Hasbro updated the pronouns shortly after the toy line's release. The Lego Jurassic World line was also released in 2015.

In 2016, Mattel took the toy license from Hasbro, in a deal which started one year later. Mattel produced various toys for Jurassic World: Fallen Kingdom, including dinosaurs, action figures, and Barbie dolls. Mattel's dinosaur toys included symbols which could be scanned with a cell phone, providing facts about each animal through a mobile app known as Jurassic World Facts. Lego and Funko also created toys based on the film. In addition, Mattel released the Jurassic World Legacy Collection, which included toys based on characters and dinosaurs from the Jurassic Park trilogy.

In 2019, Mattel unveiled the Amber Collection, a toy line of posable characters and dinosaurs that had been featured in the first film. The Amber Collection continued for several years. In 2020, Mattel also released toys based on Jurassic World Camp Cretaceous. A year later, the company partnered with Target Corporation to sell a line of toys custom-made by the fan site Jurassic Outpost. In 2022, Mattel also released a new series of toys known as the Hammond Collection, focusing on the first three films. New toys were also released in 2023, commemorating the 30th anniversary of the first film.

=== Board games ===
Board games were released by Milton Bradley for the first two Jurassic Park films. Hasbro and Milton Bradley also released two board games for Jurassic Park III.

Jurassic Park: Danger!, released by Ravensburger in 2018, pits humans and dinosaurs against each other. Jurassic World: The Board Game was released in 2018. Meanwhile, Mondo was working on a board game to be known as Jurassic Park: The Chaos Gene, although it was canceled during development. In 2019, Mondo announced that characters and dinosaurs from the Jurassic Park franchise would be released as playable characters for its Unmatched board game. The first set of characters was released in 2020.

In 2021, Hasbro released a version of Monopoly based on the original Jurassic Park film. Jurassic World: The Legacy of Isla Nublar is a legacy board game released in 2022. It was designed by Funko's design studio, Prospero Hall.

=== Comics ===
==== Topps Comics ====
In May 1993, it was reported that Topps Comics had acquired the rights to produce a comic adaptation of the then upcoming Jurassic Park. In July of that year, it was reported that Topps had plans for publishing further comics based on Jurassic Park beyond the film adaptation. In September of that year, in response to the success experienced by both the film and the comic adaptation, Topps commissioned the two issue comic sequel Jurassic Park: Raptor.

From June 1993 to August 1997, the now-defunct Topps Comics published comic adaptations of Jurassic Park and The Lost World: Jurassic Park, as well as several tie-in series.

- Jurassic Park #0–4 (June–September 1993). Adaptation of the film, adapted by Walter Simonson and pencilled by Gil Kane. Each issue had two covers – a main cover by Gil Kane, with the variant by Dave Cockrum. Issue #0 features two prequel stories to the film, and was only available with the trade paperback of the film adaptation.
- Jurassic Park: Raptor #1–2 (November–December 1993). Written by Steve Englehart and pencilled by Armando Gil and Dell Barras.
- Jurassic Park: Raptors Attack #1–4 (March–June 1994). Written by Steve Englehart, pencilled by Armando Gil (#1) and Chaz Truog, with covers by Michael Golden.
- Jurassic Park: Raptors Hijack #1–4 (July–October 1994). Written by Steve Englehart, pencilled by Neil Vokes, with covers by Michael Golden.
- Jurassic Park Annual #1 (May 1995). Featuring two stories, one being a sequel and one being a prequel. Written by Bob Almond, Michael Golden and Renée Witterstaetter, pencilled by Claude St. Aubin and Ed Murr, with a cover by Michael Golden.
- Return to Jurassic Park #1–9 (April 1995 – February 1996). An ongoing series, the first four issues were written by Steve Englehart and pencilled by Joe Staton. The next four issues were written by Tom Bierbaum and Mary Bierbaum, being drawn by Armando Gil. The first 8 issues had covers by Michael Golden. The ninth and final issue was a jam book written by Keith Giffen and Dwight Jon Zimmerman, featuring artwork by such acclaimed artists as Jason Pearson, Adam Hughes, Paul Gulacy, John Byrne, Kevin Maguire, Mike Zeck, George Pérez and Paul Chadwick, with a cover by John Bolton.
- The Lost World: Jurassic Park #1–4 (May–August 1997). Adaptation of the second film, adapted by Don McGregor and pencilled by Jeff Butler (#1–2) and Claude St. Aubin (#3–4). Each issue of the series featured two covers – one by Walter Simonson and a photo cover.

==== IDW Comics ====
Beginning in June 2010, IDW Publishing began publishing Jurassic Park comics. They also acquired the rights to reprint the issues published by Topps in the 1990s, which they began to do in trade paperback format starting in November 2010. After a four-year hiatus, IDW announced a comic series based on Jurassic World that was to be released in 2017.

- Jurassic Park: Redemption #1–5 (June 2010 – October 2010). Five-issue series written by Bob Schreck with art by Nate van Dyke. Each issue has a main cover penciled by Tom Yeates, with variant covers by Frank Miller, Arthur Adams, Paul Pope, Bernie Wrightson, and Bill Stout, respectively.
- Jurassic Park: The Devils in the Desert #1–4 (January 2011 – April 2011). Four-issue series written and illustrated by John Byrne.
- Jurassic Park: Dangerous Games #1–5 (September 2011 – January 2012). Five-issue series written by Greg Bear and Erik Bear, with art by Jorge Jiménez and a variant cover by Geof Darrow.

This series has been collected in the following trade paperbacks:

| Title | Material collected | No. of pages | ISBN |
|---|---|---|---|
| Jurassic Park | Jurassic Park #1–4 | 128 pages | 1-85286-502-4 |
| The Lost World: Jurassic Park | The Lost World: Jurassic Park #1–4 | 96 pages | 1-85286-885-6 |
| Jurassic Park Vol. 1: Redemption | Jurassic Park Redemption #1–5 | 120 pages | 1-60010-850-4 |
| Jurassic Park: The Devils in the Desert | Jurassic Park: The Devils in the Desert #1–4 | 104 pages | 1-60010-923-3 |
| Jurassic Park: Dangerous Games | Jurassic Park: Dangerous Games #1–5 | 112 pages | 1-61377-002-2 |
| Classic Jurassic Park Volume 1 | Jurassic Park #1–4 | 104 pages | 1-60010-760-5 |
| Classic Jurassic Park Volume 2: Raptors' Revenge | Juassic Park #0, Jurassic Park: Raptor #1–2, Jurassic Park: Raptors Attack #1–4 | 192 pages | 1-60010-885-7 |
| Classic Jurassic Park Volume 3: Amazon Adventure! | Jurassic Park: Raptors Hijack #1–4, Jurassic Park Annual #1 | 124 pages | 1-61377-042-1 |
| Classic Jurassic Park Volume 4: Return to Jurassic Park Part 1 | Return to Jurassic Park #1–4 | 128 pages | 1-61377-117-7 |
| Classic Jurassic Park Volume 5: Return to Jurassic Park Part 2 | Return to Jurassic Park #5–9 | 108 pages | 978-1613775332 |
| Classic Jurassic Park Volume 6: The Lost World | The Lost World: Jurassic Park #1–4 | 104 pages | 978-1613779156 |

Additionally, IDW made an agreement with ABDO to release much of the material included in the Classic Jurassic Park in hardcover form for schools and libraries.

=== Commercial ===
An Xfinity commercial directed by Taika Waititi that aired during Super Bowl LX featured Sam Neill, Laura Dern, and Jeff Goldblum reprising their roles of Alan Grant, Ellie Sattler, and Ian Malcolm and being digitally de-aged. The commercial starts with the error that happened in the park while making use of archive footage of Dr. John Hammond and Dr. Ray Arnold until an Xfinity representative fixes the problem by improving the system's Wi-Fi, averting the disastrous events of the film. The human portion of Jurassic Park becomes a resort. While on a dinosaur-themed Red Baron, Alan tells Dr. Hammond on the phone that he has decided to happily endorse his park. The final scene shows the Xfinity representative briefly getting into his van and having to exit because a Dilophosaurus got in.

=== Video games ===
Since 1993, numerous Jurassic Park video games have been produced. To accompany the release of the first film, Sega and Ocean Software published several different games for various consoles, including the NES and Sega Genesis. In 1994, Ocean produced a game sequel titled Jurassic Park 2: The Chaos Continues, while Sega released Jurassic Park: Rampage Edition. In addition, Universal Interactive Studios produced Jurassic Park Interactive for the 3DO system.

In 1997, several games were released for the second film in the franchise, including some by DreamWorks Interactive. A subsequent game, Trespasser, was released as a "digital sequel" to The Lost World: Jurassic Park. The player assumes the role of Anne, who is the sole survivor of a plane crash on InGen's "Site B" one year after the events of the film. It was released for Microsoft Windows in 1998. The third film spawned six video games for PC and Game Boy Advance. A number of lightgun arcade games were also released for all three films.

Jurassic Park: The Game is an episodic video game that takes place during and after the events of the original film. It follows a new group of survivors trying to escape Isla Nublar. It was developed by Telltale Games in a deal with Universal and was released in 2011.

Lego Jurassic World is a 2015 action-adventure video game developed by Traveller's Tales and published by Warner Bros. Interactive Entertainment. It follows the plots of the series' first four films.

Several park-building games have been released, including Jurassic Park: Operation Genesis (2003), Jurassic World: The Game (2015), Jurassic World Evolution (2018), Jurassic World Evolution 2 (2021), and Jurassic World Evolution 3 (2025). Jurassic World Aftermath, a virtual reality game, was released in 2020.

In December 2023, it was announced that a video game titled Jurassic Park: Survival is in development. With a story set chronologically one day after the first film, the installment follows a young InGen scientist who has been left behind on Isla Nublar. It is being developed by Saber Interactive and will feature action-adventure gameplay from a first-person perspective.

== Attractions ==
=== Theme park rides ===
Several theme parks rides based on the series have opened at Universal's theme parks.

==== Universal Studios Hollywood ====
Jurassic Park: The Ride was originally built at Universal Studios Hollywood, with development starting in 1990, before the film began shooting. At a cost of over $100 million, Jurassic Park: The Ride was the most expensive theme park attraction built up to that point. The Hollywood attraction opened on June 21, 1996, and operated until September 3, 2018. It reopened the following year as Jurassic World: The Ride, themed after the 2015 film Jurassic World.

| Attraction | Year opened | Description | Manufacturer | Minimum Height requirements |
|---|---|---|---|---|
| Jurassic Park: The Ride | 1996 (closed 2018) | A water-based amusement ride based on Steven Spielberg's 1993 film Jurassic Park and Michael Crichton's novel of the same name. | Vekoma | 42 in (107 cm) |
| Jurassic World: The Ride | 2019 | A water-based amusement ride based on the 2015 film Jurassic World | Vekoma | 42 in (107 cm) |
| Raptor Encounter | 1999 | A live show performed outside the Jurassic World attraction featuring a "raptor handler" and a velociraptor. | | none |
| DinoPlay | 1999 | An interactive play area with fossils, cargo nets, ladders and slides. | | 48" (121.9 cm) |

==== Universal Islands of Adventure ====
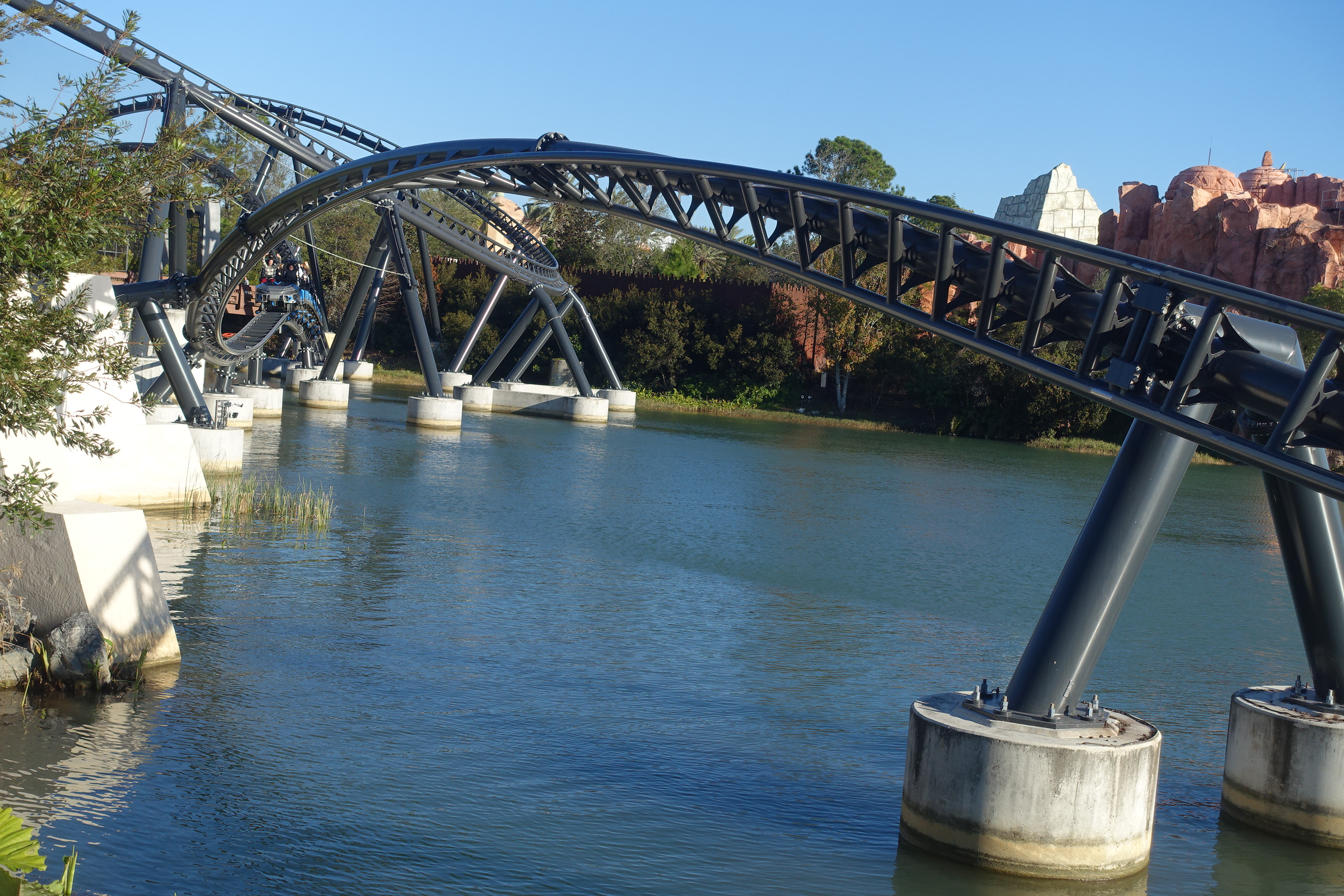
The VelociCoaster's "Mosasaurus Roll" at Universal Islands of Adventure. Jurassic Park River Adventure, Islands of Adventure, Florida

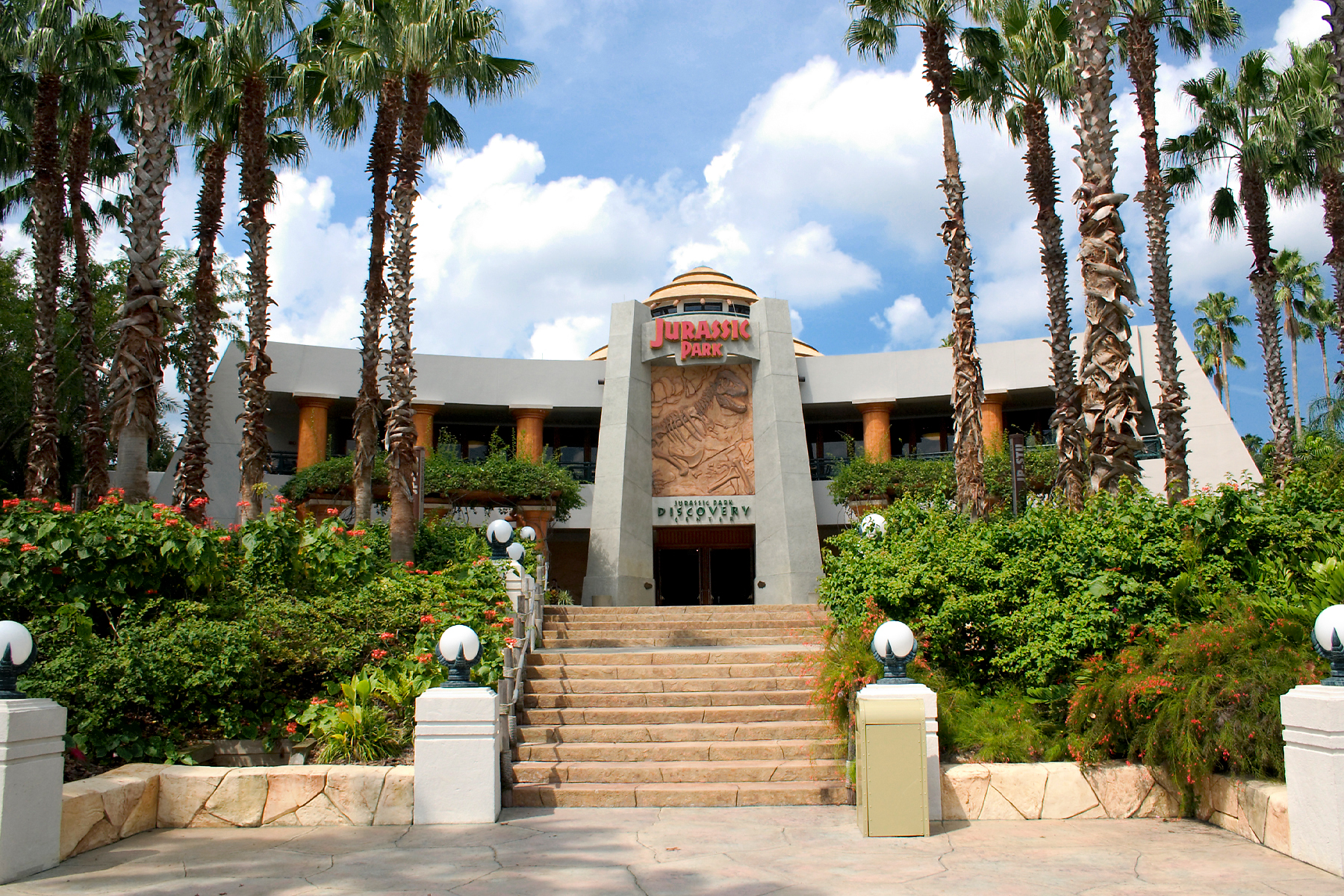
Jurassic Park Discovery Center at Universal Islands of Adventure

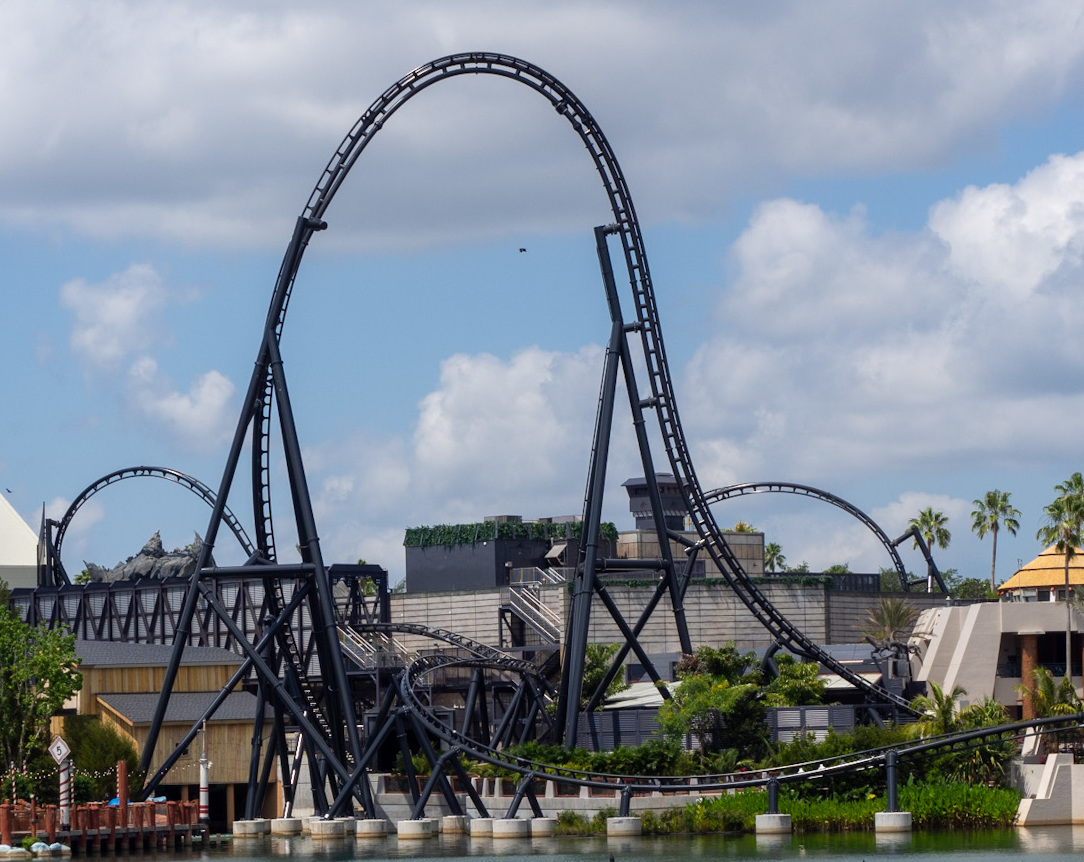
VelociCoaster

Jurassic Park River Adventure opened in 1999, as part of Universal Islands of Adventure in Orlando, Florida, within its Jurassic Park-themed land. Set after the events of the first film, the area undertakes the guise of John Hammond's dinosaur theme park featured in the series. The land also features an interactive play area and a recreation of the Visitor Center from the first film.

A roller coaster, known as VelociCoaster, opened at Universal Islands of Adventure in June 2021. The ride won the Golden Ticket Award for Best New Roller Coaster of 2020/21. The coaster's signature element is a heartline roll dubbed the "Mosasaurus Roll", which inverts riders over water at 53 mph (85 km/h).

| Attraction | Year opened | Description | Manufacturer | Height requirements |
|---|---|---|---|---|
| Camp Jurassic | 1999 | A children's play area centered around an imported 50-foot (15 m) tall Banyan tree. The area features a variety of play elements including slides, nets, water guns and fountains. | | |
| Jurassic Park River Adventure | 1999 | A water-based amusement ride based on Steven Spielberg's 1993 film Jurassic Park and Michael Crichton's novel of the same name. | Superior Rigging & Erection | 42 in (107 cm) |
| Pteranodon Flyers | 1999 | A steel roller coaster based on the animal of the same name, where guests travel a small circuit around Camp Jurassic. | Setpoint USA | Between 36 and 56 in (91–142 cm) |
| VelociCoaster | 2021 | A launched roller coaster based on the Velociraptor from Jurassic World. | Intamin | 51 in (130 cm) |
| Jurassic Park Discovery Center | 1999 | An interactive play area in which guests can learn about dinosaurs and how they lived. | | |

==== Universal Studios Japan ====
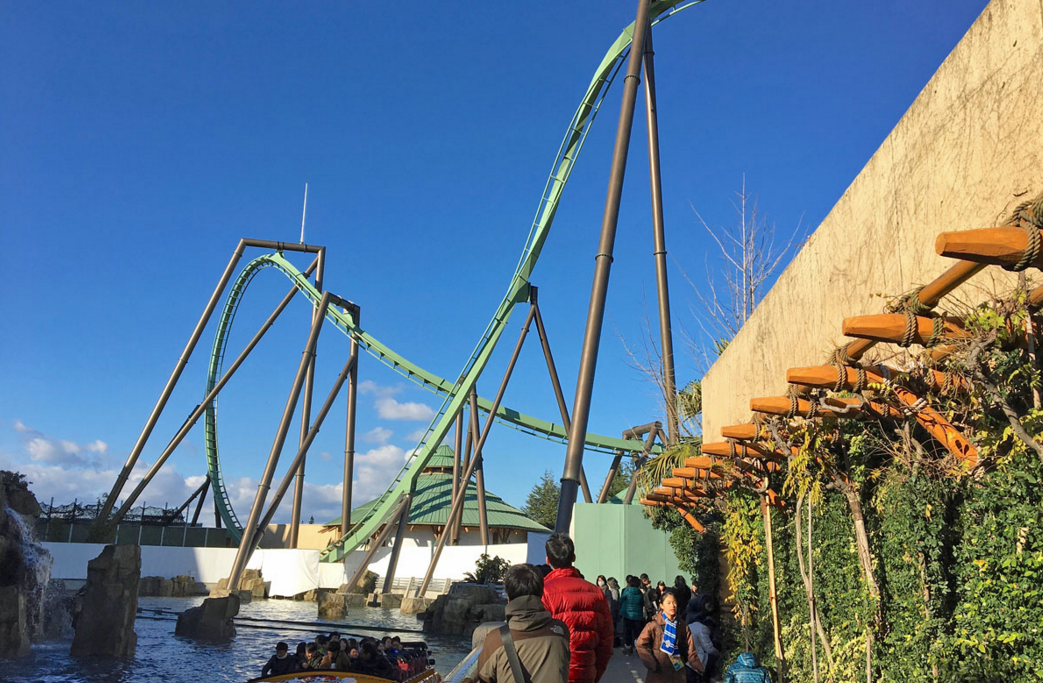
The Flying Dinosaur, Universal Studios Japan

Universal Studios Japan, located in Osaka, opened in 2001 with its own Jurassic Park: The Ride, built as a mirrored version of the Orlando attraction. In 2016, the park opened The Flying Dinosaur, a flying roller coaster that holds the record for being the fastest flying roller coaster. The cars in this coaster reach a top speed of 100 km/h (62 mph).

| Name | Opened | Description | Manufacturer | Height Requirement |
|---|---|---|---|---|
| Jurassic Park: The Ride | 2001 | A water-based amusement ride based on Steven Spielberg's 1993 film Jurassic Park and Michael Crichton's novel of the same name. | Vekoma | 122 cm |
| The Flying Dinosaur | 2016 | A flying roller coaster that holds the record for being the most expensive roller coaster ever manufactured by B&M. | B&M | 132 cm or more and 198 cm or less (4 ft 4 in - 6 ft 6 in.) |

==== Universal Studios Singapore ====
Universal Studios Singapore opened Jurassic Park Rapids Adventure, a river rapids ride, in 2010. The park also features Canopy Flyer, a suspended roller coaster, and Dino-Soarin, an aerial carousel-styled children's ride.

==== Universal Studios Beijing ====
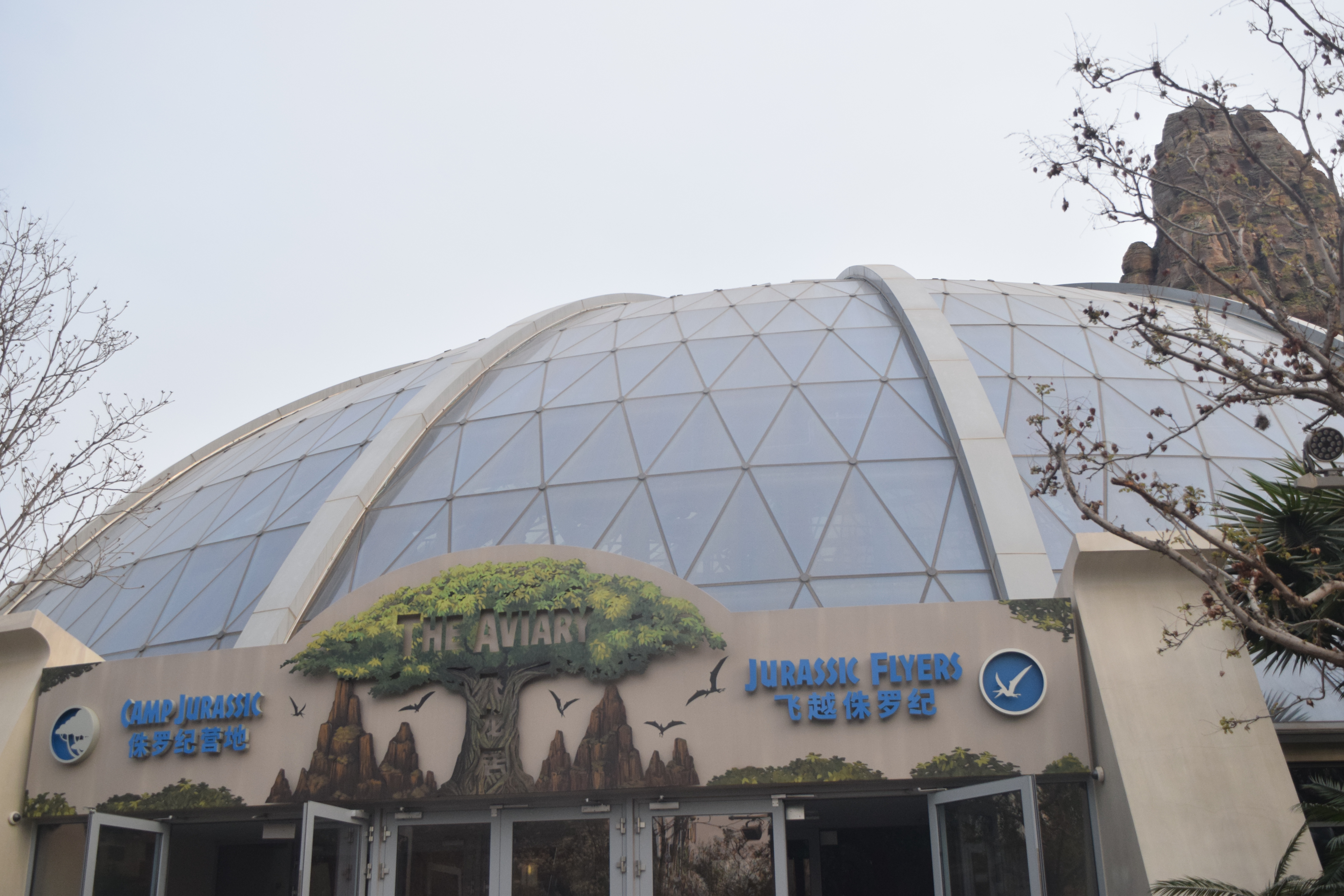
The Aviary at Isla Nublar, which contains both Camp Jurassic and Jurassic Flyers.

Universal Studios Beijing, which opened in 2021, features three rides.

| Name | Opened | Description | Manufacturer | Height Requirement |
|---|---|---|---|---|
| Jurassic World Adventure | 2021 | A new motion-base ride, featuring an animatronic Tyrannosaurus rex, Indominus Rex and Velociraptors. | P&P Projects | 102 cm |
| Jurassic Flyers | 2021 | A steel inverted powered coaster. | Mack Rides | 100 cm |
| Camp Jurassic | 2021 | A children's play area, located in an indoor aviary. | | |

==== Universal Kids Resort ====
Universal Kids Resort, which opened in July 2026, is the newest theme park land themed after the Jurassic World franchise. It is also based on DreamWorks Animation's Jurassic World Camp Cretaceous series. The land contains three rides -- Jurassic World: Cretaceous Coaster, Mr. DNA's Double Helix Spin, and Pteranodrop.

| Name | Opened | Description | Manufacturer | Height Requirement |
|---|---|---|---|---|
| Jurassic World: Cretaceous Coaster | 2026 | Board a Jurassic World ranger vehicle and join the search for Baby Bumpy as you roar through the land on this exciting roller coaster ride. | | 39” (99 cm) |
| Mr. DNA's Double Helix Spin | 2026 | A tower-shaped ride allowing up to 4 different motions to act on visitors. | Metallbau Emmeln | |
| Pteranodrop | 2026 | | | 36” (92 cm) |

==== Future parks ====
Universal Studios Great Britain, set to open in 2031, is rumored to feature a Jurassic-themed land.

=== Exhibitions ===
In June 1993, the American Museum of Natural History in New York debuted The Dinosaurs of Jurassic Park, an exhibition featuring dinosaurs that were created for use in the first film. The exhibition opening coincided with the film. Other museums were threatened with legal action for using the word "Jurassic" in exhibit titles.

A travelling exhibition, The Lost World: The Life and Death of Dinosaurs, went on tour in 1997. The exhibit was produced in connection with the second film, and its centerpiece was a 70-foot-long recreation of a Mamenchisaurus, a dinosaur featured in the film.

Another travelling exhibit, The Dinosaurs of Jurassic Park and The Lost World, (Note: Also known as The Dinosaurs of Jurassic Park: The Lost World.) went on tour in 1998. It was created by Don Lessem, and featured dinosaurs that were made for the first two films, as well as sets and props, and a video narrated by Jeff Goldblum. It also featured the 70-foot Mamenchisaurus. The exhibit was ongoing as of 2001.

Jurassic Park: The Life and Death of Dinosaurs was an exhibition that traveled around the United States during 2002. It was also created by Lessem and included dinosaur sculptures from the films, as well as cast skeletons and fossils.

In 2001, Universal Studios and Amblin Entertainment created the Jurassic Park Institute, an educational program that included a website, as well as travelling dinosaur exhibits in later years. The exhibit toured in Japan under the name Jurassic Park Institute Tour, and a video game, Jurassic Park Institute Tour: Dinosaur Rescue, was released to accompany it. The tour, designed by Thinkwell Design & Production, won a Thea award in 2005 for Outstanding Achievement.

Jurassic World: The Exhibition was located at the Melbourne Museum in Australia for six months during 2016. The travelling exhibition was also held in 2017, at the Franklin Institute in Philadelphia, and at the Field Museum in Chicago. A new North American tour was launched in 2021, starting in Texas.

=== Others ===
A live show, titled Jurassic World Live, started touring in 2019.

Jurassic World: The Experience is a touring exhibition that features animatronic dinosaurs and recreated locations from the franchise. It is a collaboration between Universal Destinations & Experiences, Asset World Corporation, and Neon, a Singapore-based firm. The exhibition tour will visit Bangkok, London, Bogata, Munich, Singapore, and other cities worldwide.

== See also ==
- List of films featuring dinosaurs
