= Jurassic World (disambiguation) =

Jurassic World is a 2015 American science fiction adventure film and the fourth film in the Jurassic Park film series.

Jurassic World may also refer to:

- Michael Crichton's Jurassic World, the 1997 omnibus edition of the novels Jurassic Park and The Lost World

== Film and television ==
- Jurassic World: Fallen Kingdom, a 2018 sequel to Jurassic World
- Jurassic World Dominion, a 2022 sequel to Jurassic World: Fallen Kingdom
- Jurassic World Rebirth, a 2025 sequel to Jurassic World: Dominion.
- Jurassic World Camp Cretaceous, a 2020 animated television series
- Jurassic World: Chaos Theory, a 2024 animated television series

== Attractions ==
- Jurassic World: The Ride, a Universal Studios Hollywood theme park ride based on the Jurassic World films
- Jurassic World Adventure, an immersive ride experience at Universal Studios Beijing

== Soundtracks ==
- Jurassic World (film score), the soundtrack album for the 2015 film
- Jurassic World: Fallen Kingdom (film score), the soundtrack album for the 2018 film
- Jurassic World Dominion (soundtrack), the soundtrack album for the 2022 film
- Jurassic World Rebirth (soundtrack), the soundtrack album for the 2025 film

== Video games ==
- Jurassic World: The Game, 2015
- Lego Jurassic World, 2015
- Jurassic World Evolution, 2018
- Jurassic World Evolution 2, 2022
- Jurassic World Evolution 3, 2025

== See also ==
- Jurassic Park (disambiguation)
