= Jurassic Park (disambiguation) =

Jurassic Park is a 1993 film directed by Steven Spielberg.

Jurassic Park may also refer to:

== Arts, entertainment, and media ==
- Jurassic Park (franchise), a series of books, films, and video games centering around a fictional theme park
  - Jurassic Park (novel), by Michael Crichton, 1990

=== Games ===
- Jurassic Park (arcade game), 1994
- Jurassic Park (computer video game), a 1993 Ocean Software game for Amiga and MS-DOS
- Jurassic Park (NES video game), 1993
- Jurassic Park (pinball), a 1993 pinball machine from Data East and 2019 pinball machine from Stern Pinball
- Jurassic Park (Sega CD video game), 1994
- Jurassic Park (Sega Genesis video game), 1993
- Jurassic Park (SNES video game), 1993
- Jurassic Park: The Game, 2011
- Jurassic Park Interactive, a 1994 3DO video game

=== Music ===
- Jurassic Park (film score), the musical score for the 1993 film, composed by John Williams
- "Jurassic Park" (song), a 1993 parody song by "Weird Al" Yankovic
- "Jurassic Park", a 2020 song by Stand Atlantic from Pink Elephant
- "T-Rex [Jurassic Park]", a track by Basshunter from his compilation album The Old Shit

== Theme park rides ==
- Jurassic Park: The Ride, a water-based amusement ride located at Universal Islands of Adventure and Universal Studios Japan, and formerly at Universal Studios Hollywood
- Jurassic Park Rapids Adventure, a water-based amusement ride located at Universal Studios Singapore

== Other uses ==
- Maple Leaf Square, a public square in Toronto, Ontario, Canada, also known colloquially as Jurassic Park when hosting outdoor viewing parties of significant Toronto Raptors NBA games
- Mississauga Celebration Square, a public square in Mississauga, Greater Toronto, Ontario, Canada, also known colloquially as Jurassic Park West when hosting outdoor viewing parties of significant Toronto Raptors NBA games
- "Jurassic Park", The Keith & Paddy Picture Show season 2, episode 5 (2018)

== See also ==
- Jurassic Park video games
- Jurassic World (disambiguation)
- Lost World (disambiguation)
