= Jurassic World Live =

American live dinosaur show

- Product type: Live show
- Produced by: Feld Entertainment
- Country: International
- Introduced: 2019
- Website: Official website

Jurassic World Live is a live show produced by Feld Entertainment and NBCUniversal based on the Jurassic World franchise. The show started touring arenas around the United States in September 2019, beginning with the Schottenstein Center in Columbus, Ohio.

== Show ==
Jurassic World Live Tour is a live arena show. Twenty-four dinosaurs are included in the show with seven species in total. These dinosaurs include a 43-foot long T. rex that weighs 8,000 lbs., Blue, the Velociraptor from the Jurassic World franchise, and Pteranodons that will swoop down and pick performers up during the show.

The dinosaurs move through animatronics (for the larger dinosaurs) and live acting (for the smaller dinosaurs) in which "dinoteers" walk the dinosaurs around the arena while wearing dinosaur costumes. The show also features stunts using props such as a Jurassic World Jeep, motorcycles and a Gyrosphere.

The show is canon. The production crew consulted with Steven Spielberg, Colin Trevorrow and Frank Marshall during the creation of the show, ensuring that there were no continuity errors between the show and the Jurassic World story, as well as ensuring that the dinosaurs, props and tone of the show aligned with that of the Jurassic World franchise. The show features the original score from the movies.

== Storyline ==
The Jurassic World Live Tour show follows an original storyline that takes place at some point between the first two Jurassic World movies. The story is written by Shawn Thomas and Steve Jarczak and directed by Dan Shipton and Ross Nicholson. The story begins on the day Jurassic World falls and ends before the beginning of the adventures shown in Jurassic World: Fallen Kingdom. The story will focus around a team of scientists led by Dr. Kate Walker that have been working on a "Dino-Decoder," a device that allows humans to understand dinosaur emotions. After the Indominus rex escapes on Isla Nublar, the team becomes separated. It is not until later on when the "Dino-Decoder" sends out a signal that the team discovers that Jeannie - a Troodon that the team had been testing the device on - is still alive. As the team sets out on a quest to save her, they discover that InGen still intends to weaponize dinosaurs and that they are intrigued by the "Dino-Decoder" and Jeannie. The adventure moves to an InGen facility in Chile, where conflict breaks out featuring dinosaur-on-dinosaur and dinosaur-on-human battles. The story then circles back to Isla Nublar.
