= Tomorrowland (soundtrack) =

Tomorrowland (Original Motion Picture Soundtrack)

Film score by Michael Giacchino
- Released: May 19, 2015
- Recorded: 2014–2015
- Studios: Sony Scoring Stage, Sony Pictures Studios, Culver City, California; Eastwood Scoring Stage, Warner Bros., Los Angeles, California
- Genre: Film score
- Length: 73:08
- Label: Walt Disney
- Producer: Michael Giacchino

Michael Giacchino chronology
Jupiter Ascending (2015)	Tomorrowland (2015)	Jurassic World (2015)

Tomorrowland (Original Motion Picture Soundtrack) is the soundtrack to the 2015 film of the same name directed by Brad Bird. The film's musical score is composed and arranged by Michael Giacchino in his fourth successive collaboration with Bird since The Incredibles (2004). Tomorrowland was scored during Giacchino's subsequent schedules with Inside Out and Jurassic World. The score was released digitally on May 19, 2015 and through physical formats on June 2, by Walt Disney Records. The score received generally positive reviews from critics.

== Reception ==
Music critic Jonathan Broxton of Movie Music UK wrote "Tomorrowland pushes all the right buttons and hits all the right marks, standing as one of the year's best scores to date." Thomas Glorieux of Maintitles.net wrote "Perhaps too long for repeated listens, Tomorrowland nonetheless remains a breath of fresh air if you compare it with most scores of this year." James Southall of Movie Wave wrote "Tomorrowland is right up there with Ratatouille, undoubtedly more saccharine but that's kept in check just enough that it is never a problem [...] It's a long album but never seems so, with constant energy and enthusiasm proving infectious."

Tim Grierson of Screen International called it "joyful" while Todd McCarthy of The Hollywood Reporter stated that the score "energetically pushes things along". David Edelstein of Vulture wrote "composer Michael Giacchino lovingly conjure up the kid-movie era of high-school science fairs and friendly giant robots". Greg Cwilk of IndieWire wrote "Michael Giacchino channels John Williams for his rousing score, though he goes more for mood than themes."

== Track listing ==
No.	Title	Length
1.	"A Story About the Future"	0:54
2.	"A Prologue"	1:29
3.	"You've Piqued My Pin-Trist"	3:27
4.	"Boat Wait, There's More!"	1:08
5.	"Edge of Tomorrowland"	5:17
6.	"Casey v Zeitgeist"	1:23
7.	"Home Wheat Home"	0:42
8.	"Pin-Ultimate Experience"	4:53
9.	"A Touching Tale"	1:36
10.	"World's Worst Shopkeepers"	3:34
11.	"Just Get In the Car"	1:42
12.	"Texting While Driving"	0:47
13.	"Frank Frank"	1:18
14.	"All House Assault"	4:04
15.	"People Mover and Shaker"	5:26
16.	"What an Eiffel!"	6:56
17.	"Welcome Back, Walker!"	2:31
18.	"Sphere and Loathing"	2:21
19.	"As the World Burns"	4:24
20.	"The Battle of Bridgeway"	2:52
21.	"The Hail Athena Pass"	0:59
22.	"Electric Dreams"	4:40
23.	"Pins of a Feather"	5:19
24.	"End Credits"	5:26

== Accolades ==
Award / Film Festival	Category	Nominees	Result	Ref(s)
World Soundtrack Academy	Soundtrack Composer of the Year	Michael Giacchino	Won	

== Personnel ==
Credits adapted from liner notes.

- Music composer and producer – Michael Giacchino
- Recording – Vincent Cirilli, Joel Iwataki
- Mixing – Joel Iwataki
- Mastering – Patricia Sullivan
- Music editor – Alex Levy, Warren Brown
- Musical assistance – David Coker
- Technical assistance – Eric Wegener
- Score co-ordinator – Andrea Datzman
- Copyist – Booker White, Jeff Kryka, Walt Disney Music Library
- Music business and legal affairs – Don Welty, Scott Holtzman
- Executive in charge of music – Mitchell Leib
- Production manager – Ryan Hopman
- Design – Steve Sterling
- Liner notes – Brad Bird, Michael Giacchino

Instrumentation

- Bass – Charles Nenneker, Donald Ferrone, Karl Vincent, Norman Ludwin, Oscar Hidalgo, Peter Doubrovsky, David Stone
- Bassoon – Allen Savedoff, Andrew Radford, Kenneth Munday
- Cello – Alisha Bauer, Cameron Stone, Dane Little, Dermot Mulroney, Erika Duke-Kirkpatrick, John Acosta, Kevan Torfeh, Matthew Cooker, Rudolph Stein, Stefanie Fife, Suzie Katayama, Vahe Hayrikyan, Victor Lawrence, Steven Richards
- Clarinet – John Mitchell, Phillip Feather, Michael Vaccaro
- Electric bass – Nathan East
- Flute – David Shostac, Richard Mitchell, Robert Shulgold
- French horn – Amy Sanchez, Brad Warnaar, Brian O'Connor, David Everson, Joseph Meyer, John Reynolds, Steven Becknell, Richard Todd
- Guitar – George Doering
- Harp – Gayle Levant
- Keyboards – Alan Steinberger, James Cox
- Oboe – Joseph Stone, John Yoakum
- Percussion – Alexander Neciosup-Acuna, Bernard Dresel, Donald Williams, Emil Radocchia, Michael Englander, Walter Rodriguez, Daniel Greco
- Piano – Gloria Cheng, Mark Gasbarro
- Trombone – Alan Kaplan, William Reichenbach, Steven Holtman, William Booth, Alexander Iles
- Trumpet – Jeffrey Bunnell, Jon Lewis, Paul Salvo, Malcolm McNab
- Tuba – John Van Houten
- Viola – Alan Busteed, Cameron Patrick, Caroline Buckman, Evan Wilson, Harry Shirinian, Jorge Moraga, Karen Elaine, Karie Prescott, Leah Katz, Maria Newman, Michael Nowak, Pamela Goldsmith, Scott Hosfeld, Darrin McCann
- Violin – Aimee Kreston, Alexander Shlifer, Armen Anassian, Barbra Porter, Belinda Broughton, Carolyn Osborn, Chang "Tina" Qu, Cheryl Kim, Galina Golovin, Gina Kronstadt, Jacqueline Brand, James Sitterly, Joel Derouin, John Wittenberg, Josefina Vergara, Laurence Greenfield, Marina Manukian, Marisa Kuney, Mark Robertson, Nicole Bush, Norman Hughes, Peter Kent, Rafael Rishik, Razdan Kuyumjian, Rebecca Bunnell, Robert Matsuda, Ron Clark, Eugene "Sam" Fischer, Sara Parkins, Shari Zippert, Songa Lee, Terence Glenny, Tiffany Yi Hu, Vladimir Polimatidi, Kenneth Yerke

Orchestra

- Orchestra conductor – Tim Simonec
- Orchestration – Tim Simonec, Dave Giuli, Marshall Bowen, Susie Seiter
- Orchestra contractor – Reggie Wilson
- Assistant orchestra contractor – Connie Boylan
- Concertmaster – Clayton Haslop
- Booth monitor – Andrea Datzman
- Crew (Sony Pictures Scoring Stage) – Adam Michalak, David Marquette, Greg Dennen, Greg Loskorn
- Crew (Warner Bros. Eastwood Scoring Stage) – Jamie Olvera, Ryan Robinson, Tom Hardisty

Vocals

- Choir conductor – Marshall Bowen
- Vocal contractor – Bobbi Page
- Alto – Adair Gilliam, Amy Fogerson, Andrea Datzman, Ann Sheridan, Baraka May Williams, Bobbi Page, Charissa Nielsen, Christy Crowl, Clydene Jackson, Debbie Hall Gleason, Donna Medine, Edie Lehmann Boddicker, Karen Harper, Katie Campbell, Katie Hampton, Laura Jackman, Leanna Brand, Monica Lee, Scottie Haskell, Vangie Gunn, Victoria Levy
- Baritone – Aaron Page, Ed Zajac, Guy Maeda, Josh Bedlion, Larry Kenton, Randy Crenshaw, Rick Logan
- Bass – Alvin Chea, Bob Joyce, Dylan Gentile, Eric Bradley, James Hayden, Michael Geiger, Reid Bruton, Will Goldman
- Soprano – Ayana Haviv, Christine Guter, Diane Reynolds, Elin Carlson, Elissa Johnston, Harriet Fraser, Holly Sedillos, Jenny Graham, Joanna Bushnell, Karen Whipple Schnurr, Kimberly Lingo, Monique Donnelly Titman, Nancy Gassner Clayton, Renee Burkett, Sally Stevens, Sandie Hall, Susie Stevens Logan, Suzanne Waters, Teri Koide
- Tenor – Amick Byram, Arnold Livingston Geis, Craig Copeland, DJ Harper, David Joyce, Fletcher Sheridan, Gary Stockdale, Gerald White, Greg Whipple, Michael Kohl, Michael Lichtenauer, Oren Waters, Scott Oatley, Steve Amerson, Walt Harrah
