= Jurassic World Rebirth (soundtrack) =

Jurassic World Rebirth (Original Motion Picture Soundtrack)

Film score by Alexandre Desplat
- Released: July 2, 2025
- Recorded: April 2025
- Studios: Abbey Road Studios, London
- Genre: Film score
- Length: 102:00
- Label: Back Lot Music
- Producer: Alexandre Desplat

Alexandre Desplat chronology
The Phoenician Scheme (2025)	Jurassic World Rebirth (2025)	Frankenstein (2025)

Singles from Jurassic World Rebirth (Original Motion Picture Soundtrack)
- 1. "Boat Chase" Released: June 26, 2025

Jurassic World Rebirth (Original Motion Picture Soundtrack) is the soundtrack album to the 2025 film Jurassic World Rebirth, the fourth Jurassic World film and the seventh installment overall in the Jurassic Park franchise. The score was composed, co-orchestrated, and conducted by Alexandre Desplat and recorded at Abbey Road Studios in London. The score was released through Back Lot Music on July 2, 2025, the same day as the film, with the first of the tracks, "Boat Chase" preceded as the lead single from the album on June 26.

== Background ==
In April 2025, Alexandre Desplat was confirmed as the composer for Jurassic World Rebirth, reuniting with Edwards after Godzilla (2014). Desplat replaces previous Jurassic World composer Michael Giacchino in a contrasting parallel to Rogue One (2016), another film directed by Edwards, in which Giacchino replaced Desplat as composer due to reshoots which left the latter unavailable.

"At first, you're excited, then panic comes along because you realize that you're taking over from a fabulous composer who invented so many great things that the whole planet knows. You try to find your way through that [...] You try to make it your own, and at the same time, pay homage to Williams' music, and try to find your own way through that by inventing new themes and ideas, but staying in the same artistic zone as the scores of the franchise."

— Desplat on paying homage to Williams' scores from the first two Jurassic Park films

Desplat incorporated previous musical themes by John Williams from the first two Jurassic Park films. He considered it as "quite a daunting task" due to Williams' body of work consisting of iconic films, and wanted to honor his work, balancing how and where he could blend Williams' theme by predominant use of orchestral score. He also wanted to create his own material within the context of the film's story, by inventing new themes and ideas but staying in the same artistic zone as the scores of the franchise. The emotional aspect of the film was split into two sections: the group of people looking for the dinosaurs, and another group of people, which is a family. Desplat composed two different themes and melodies that belonged to the groups, while the rest of the aspect were the action, for which he provided action music.. Desplat had prior done something similar for the two Harry Potter and the Deathly Hallows film adaptations, where he had reused several cues from John Williams' original score for the first film, while also composing new material.

Edwards highly praised Desplat's work for Rebirth and his approach on paying homage to Williams' score. He noted that Williams' themes were referenced at multiple points and Desplat had incorporated several versions of it, but for one particular version, he felt that "some magic was missing" as a fan and could not be played in the end credits as it need to reference Williams' theme as the needle drop, similar to the first film. Hence, the said theme was played twice and used in two different places. Some of Wiliams' work were subtly incorporated with little hints of that time in certain moments.

Desplat recorded the score at Abbey Road Studios in London, with a 105-piece orchestra and a 60-piece choir. Desplat orchestrated his score alongside longtime collaborators Conrad Pope, who worked on the original film score, Jean-Pascal Beintus, Nicolas Charron, Sylvain Morizet, Bill Newlin, Larry Rench and Nan Schwartz, with Desplat conducting. Besides acting in the film, Bailey contributed to the film score by playing clarinet solos; Bailey added that he "got goosebumps" on listening to Desplat's score resulting in his involvement on playing clarinet, which he did during his school days.

== Release ==
Back Lot Music announced that the soundtrack would be released on July 2, 2025, the same date as the film. The track list was announced on June 26, consisted of 34 tracks, with the first track "Boat Chase" being made available for release as a single. A vinyl edition of the album is scheduled to be released through Mutant.

== Track listing ==
Jurassic World Rebirth (Original Motion Picture Soundtrack) track listing
No.	Title	Length
1.	"Opening Lab"	4:53
2.	"Bridge of Deal"	0:59
3.	"Natural History Museum" (includes Jurassic Park theme by John Williams)	5:04
4.	"Team Gathered" (includes Jurassic Park theme by John Williams)	1:12
5.	"Voyage"	2:51
6.	"Dart Show"	1:18
7.	"Zora and Kincaid"	2:24
8.	"Mosasaur Attacks Yacht"	4:00
9.	"Zora and Loomis Chat" (includes Jurassic Park theme by John Williams)	1:57
10.	"Mayday"	3:32
11.	"Mosasaur Bumps Boat"	1:12
12.	"Boat Chase"	5:15
13.	"Fins Attack – Part 1"	4:49
14.	"Fins Attack – Part 2"	1:31
15.	"Cave Swim"	3:48
16.	"Hurry"	1:42
17.	"Walking the Swamp"	3:21
18.	"The Pistol / Scare in the Trees"	1:33
19.	"Do the Job"	2:28
20.	"Dino Lovers" (includes Jurassic Park theme by John Williams)	2:59
21.	"Dino Spectacle" (includes Jurassic Park theme by John Williams)	1:43
22.	"What's This Smell?"	1:16
23.	"Crossing the River / T-Rex"	8:10
24.	"Clifftop" (includes Jurassic Park theme by John Williams)	0:36
25.	"Climbing the Wall"	3:37
26.	"Bird Strike"	3:40
27.	"Let's Go Home"	0:31
28.	"Gentle Boat Ride"	4:05
29.	"Mutadons Fly In"	4:55
30.	"The Old Lab"	2:38
31.	"Tunnel / Helicopter"	4:19
32.	"Run to the Gate"	2:44
33.	"Bella and the Beast" (includes Jurassic Park theme by John Williams)	4:50
34.	"Sailing Away" (includes Jurassic Park theme by John Williams)	2:08
Total length:		102:00

== Reception ==
Zanobard Reviews gave 8.5 out of 10 and wrote "Alexandre Desplat's stunning score for Jurassic World Rebirth returns us to the iconic franchise in utterly gorgeous style, as the composer's meticulous approach to orchestration shines across some spectacular action setpieces and impeccable renditions of themes both iconically old and entertainingly new." Jonathan Broxton of Movie Music UK wrote "the score is occasionally dialed down too much in the sound mix, resulting in a great deal of Desplat's detail getting lost under screams and roars, but in the moments where the music is allowed to sing – the boat chase sequence, the tyrannosaurus river sequence, the finale with the 'D-Rex' – it really impresses. However, it is on the album that the true excellence and intelligence of Desplat's music is revealed, and all that delicious instrumental intricacy, that thematic interplay, and that creative orchestration comes rushing into focus." Filmtracks wrote "Desplat did exactly what film score collectors could have predicted for Jurassic World Rebirth: written brilliantly precise and perfectly sufficient music at the periphery of Williams' style while somehow managing to provide absolutely nothing memorable. Despite all the consternation about Don Davis' approach to Jurassic Park III, he in retrospect handled the Williams conundrum better than Giacchino or Desplat. A 102-minute album presentation is unforgiving in its length, badly in need of consolidation to half an hour. This score is more proof that Desplat will always lack the "it" factor because of his style of writing, and if this franchise insists upon moving forward, then let's hope John Powell takes the next crack at it." James Southall of Movie Wave wrote "There hasn't been a bad score in this franchise so far – but I don't think there's been one as good as this since the last one that Williams himself wrote."

== Personnel ==
Credits adapted from liner notes:

- Music composed, produced, conducted and orchestrated by: Alexandre Desplat
- Additional score production and conducting: Solrey
- Orchestrations: Conrad Pope, Jean-Pascal Beintus
- Additional orchestrations: Bill Newlin, Larry Rench, Nan Schwartz
- Supervising music editor: Gerard McCann
- Music editor: Peter Clarke
- Orchestra leader: Thomas Bowes
- Piano: Dave Arch
- Choir contractor and conductor: Ben Parry
- Choir: London Voices
- Orchestra contractor: Isobel Griffiths Ltd.
- Score recording and mixing engineers: Peter Cobbin, Kirsty Whalley
- Music preparation: Mark Graham
- Librarian: Dave Hage
- Score assistant: Romain Allender
- Score programming: Aurelien Thoumire
- Assistant engineer: Neil Dawes
- Score recordist: Daniel Hayden
- Score editors: Ben Griffin, Wes Hicks
- Technical score productions: Xavier Forcioli
- Score recorded at: Abbey Road Studios
- Score mixed at: Sweet Thunder Mix Room
- Abbey Road Studios crew: Fiona Gillott, Kayla Hopkins, Daniela Sicilia, Ellie Macready

== Charts ==
Chart performance for Jurassic World Rebirth (Original Motion Picture Soundtrack)
Chart (2025)	Peak position
Belgian Albums (Ultratop Flanders)	138

== Release history ==
Release dates and formats for Jurassic World Rebirth (Original Motion Picture Soundtrack)
Region	Date	Format(s)	Label	Ref.
Various	July 2, 2025	Digital download; streaming	Back Lot Music	
Various	October 3, 2025	Vinyl	Mutant	
