= The Lost World: Jurassic Park (film score) =

The Lost World: Jurassic Park (Original Motion Picture Score)

Film score by John Williams
- Released: April 30, 1997
- Studios: Sony Scoring Stage, Culver City, CA
- Genre: Score
- Length: 1:13:15
- Labels: MCA, La-La Land
- Producer: John Williams

John Williams chronology
Rosewood (1997)	The Lost World: Jurassic Park (Original Motion Picture Score) (1997)	Seven Years in Tibet (1997)

Professional ratings
Review scores
Source	Rating
AllMusic	3/5 stars
Filmtracks	3/5 stars
Movie Wave	4/5 stars

The Lost World: Jurassic Park (Original Motion Picture Score) is the film score to the 1997 film of the same name composed and conducted by John Williams, performed by the Hollywood Studio Symphony, and was orchestrated by Conrad Pope, John Neufeld, Dennis Dreith, Marian Mayer and Vince Bartold. Unlike most sequel scores written by Williams, the composer did not reprise much musical material from the original film in the series, Jurassic Park, but instead developed a wildly different style and a new set of motifs for the different location, cast, and darker tone of the second Jurassic Park film. The two primary themes written for Jurassic Park are quoted only a few times in The Lost World. Director of the film Steven Spielberg felt Williams' work on the sequel was superior to his work on the first Jurassic Park film.

== Themes ==
For this score, Williams largely avoided using the three major themes he had written for Jurassic Park. Quiet strains of the so-called "island fanfare" ("Journey to the Island") are occasionally heard, with one scene even including a more robust statement copied note-for-note from the Jurassic Park cue "Jurassic Park Gate". The full version of "Journey to the Island" is not heard until the film's final scene and end credits. A full version of the original "Theme from Jurassic Park" was recorded for the film but was cut from the final product, only available on the soundtrack. However, a shorter piano rendition can be heard during Hammond's speech in the final scene.

Williams wrote two new primary themes for this score. The first is a melody typically given to the horns, trombones, and strings over an accompaniment provided by low woodwinds and percussion. This theme is darker than the "island fanfare", but its role is similar in that it underscores the expedition's adventurous nature. Williams intended to use this theme only four times in the film: for the arrival on the island, the departure from the island, in the film's final moments, and in the end credits. Statements of this theme were tracked into several additional scenes so that it is heard more often than originally intended, and the version heard in the end credits (simply entitled "The Lost World") has been adapted and published for concert performances.

The film's second new theme is a four-note melody, which is more frequently heard. The film opens with this motif, and it frequently returns to convey Isla Sorna's dark, mysterious nature and the dinosaurs that inhabit it.

== Style and orchestration ==
The score to The Lost World takes on a very different tone from that of Jurassic Park. The first film balances tense action scoring and horror elements with a sense of wonderment and awe, but the sequel is mostly devoid of the latter. Williams elected to play up the film's jungle setting with a variety of percussion instruments (including congas, bongos, "jungle drums", gourds, log drums, and tabla). These are heard during many scenes on Isla Sorna, sometimes as a quiet rhythmic background and sometimes as an intense, grooving foundation for brassy action music. The brooding, tropical atmosphere is further enhanced by other instruments, such as shakuhachi and "animal sounds" played by a synthesizer. The themes described above are present in some cues, but much of the music is not based on any identifiable theme.

Another common stylistic element in this score is aleatoric writing. To create a sense of chaos and terror, Williams provides a series of pitches to a group of instruments and instructs them to play them quickly ad lib for a given number of measures. Although this technique has been used in many scores by Williams and other composers, The Lost World employs this effect with unusual frequency, particularly for scenes involving the Compsognathus.

== Recording ==
The original soundtrack album—released by MCA Records on April 30, 1997 — features over seventy minutes of the film's music, including some material that was unused in the film's final cut (e.g. "The Hunt"). The single-disc digipak design featured dioramas of jungle scenery and dinosaurs from the film. La-La Land Records released a John Williams collection edition, joint with the soundtrack to the first film, on November 29, 2016, featuring remastered and additional unreleased music.

== Track listing ==
No.	Title	Length
1.	"The Lost World"	3:33
2.	"The Island Prologue"	5:03
3.	"Malcolm's Journey"	5:44
4.	"The Hunt"	3:30
5.	"The Trek"	5:23
6.	"Finding Camp Jurassic"	3:03
7.	"Rescuing Sarah"	4:01
8.	"Hammond's Plan"	4:30
9.	"The Raptors Appear"	3:43
10.	"The Compys Dine"	5:07
11.	"The Stegosaurus"	5:20
12.	"Ludlow's Demise"	4:27
13.	"Visitor in San Diego"	7:37
14.	"Finale and Jurassic Park Theme"	7:54

== John Williams Collection Edition ==
The score, along with that of Jurassic Park, was remastered and re-released on November 29, 2016. This 4-CD re-release included expanded tracks of John Williams' original motion picture score to the film. The score was re-issued individually on August 8, 2023, with additional alternate tracks.

Disc 3
No.	Title	Length
1.	"The Lost World"	3:36
2.	"The Island’s Voice"	3:38
3.	"Revealing the Plans"	2:18
4.	"To the Island"	3:40
5.	"The Stegosaurus" (Extended Version)	5:28
6.	"Fire at Camp and Corporate Helicopters"	3:23
7.	"The Hunt"	3:34
8.	"Big Feet"	1:44
9.	"Spilling Petrol and Horning In"	5:07
10.	"Up in a Basket"	3:27
11.	"In the Trailer"	2:21
12.	"On the Glass"	4:05
13.	"Rescuing Sarah" (Extended Version)	5:10
14.	"Reading the Map"	3:11
15.	"The Trek"	5:25
16.	"The Compys!"	4:30
Total length:		60:38

Disc 4
No.	Title	Length
1.	"Ripples"	5:55
2.	"The Long Grass"	2:28
3.	"Finding Camp Jurassic"	3:05
4.	"The Raptors Appear"	3:44
5.	"High Bar and Ceiling Tiles"	4:12
6.	"Heading North"	2:14
7.	"Ludlow's Speech"	3:15
8.	"The Wrecked Ship"	2:22
9.	"Monster on the Loose"	2:38
10.	"Visitor in San Diego" (Extended Version)	7:41
11.	"Ludlow’s End"	2:52
12.	"Tranquilizer Dart"	3:01
13.	"Jurassic Park Theme (End Credits)"	5:30
14.	"The Lost World" (Alternate)	3:37
15.	"Tranquilizer Dart and End Credits" (Film Version)	4:55
Total length:		57:30

== See also ==
- John Williams
- Jurassic Park (film score)
- Jurassic Park III (film score)
- Jurassic World (film score)

== Certifications ==
Region	Certification	Certified units/sales
Hong Kong (IFPI Hong Kong)	Platinum	20,000^{*}
^{*} Sales figures based on certification alone.
