= Jurassic Park III (soundtrack) =

Jurassic Park III: Original Motion Picture Soundtrack

Soundtrack album by Don Davis
- Released: June 12, 2001
- Studios: Newman Scoring Stage, Fox Studios, Los Angeles, CA
- Genre: Score
- Length: 54:31
- Label: Decca

Professional ratings
Review scores
| Source | Rating |
|---|---|
| AllMusic | 2.5/5 stars |
| Empire | 3/5 stars |
| Filmtracks | 3/5 stars |
| Movie Wave | 3.5/5 stars |

Jurassic Park III: Original Motion Picture Soundtrack is a score of the 2001 film of the same name. It was orchestrated, composed and conducted by Don Davis, and performed by the Hollywood Studio Symphony. Davis incorporated John Williams' themes from the previous films into the score.

== Background and composition ==
John Williams had previously composed the film soundtracks Jurassic Park (1993) and The Lost World: Jurassic Park (1997). As Jurassic Park III was underway, Williams was busy working on the A.I. Artificial Intelligence soundtrack and suggested Don Davis to handle the Jurassic Park III score. According to Davis: "I suspect he wasn't too interested in doing the third part of a franchise that he said goodbye to sometime before". Despite a rumor, James Horner was never considered to compose the film's score.

After signing on to the project, Davis became unsure if his score could live up to Williams' work. He listened to the previous Jurassic Park scores, hoping for his own to maintain consistency with them. Some of Williams' prior themes, mostly from the first film, were used in Jurassic Park III, but some were shortened or lengthened to fit certain scenes. Williams provided his original handwritten scores to Davis. One of Williams' themes is used for the returning character of Dr. Alan Grant. Davis also composed a new theme which was supposed to recreate the mending relationship between Paul and Amanda Kirby.

The score was recorded with a 104-piece of the Hollywood Studio Symphony and a 60-person choir at the Newman Scoring Stage, with Davis orchestrating and conducting. One track, "Clash of Extinction", was created for a battle scene between a T. rex and Spinosaurus, although Johnston ultimately removed the track.

Aside from Davis' score, Johnston chose to include "Big Hat, No Cattle", a song by Randy Newman from his 1999 album Bad Love.

== Original Motion Picture Soundtrack ==
Track Listing
| No. | Title | Writer(s) | Performer(s) | Length |
|---|---|---|---|---|
| 1. | "Isla Sorna Sailing Situation" | Includes Jurassic Park Theme by John Williams | | 4:32 |
| 2. | "The Dinosaur Fly-By" | Includes Jurassic Park Theme by John Williams | | 2:15 |
| 3. | "Cooper's Last Stand" | | | 2:01 |
| 4. | "The Raptor Room" | | | 2:35 |
| 5. | "Raptor Repartee" | | | 3:06 |
| 6. | "Tree People" | | | 2:04 |
| 7. | "Pteranodon Habitat" | | | 3:04 |
| 8. | "Tiny Pecking Pteranodons" | | | 3:38 |
| 9. | "Billy Oblivion" | | | 2:51 |
| 10. | "Brachiosaurus on the Bank" | Includes Jurassic Park Theme by John Williams | | 2:07 |
| 11. | "Nash Calling" | | | 3:38 |
| 12. | "Bone Man Ben" | | | 7:20 |
| 13. | "Frenzy Fuselage" | | | 4:01 |
| 14. | "Clash of Extinction" | | | 1:42 |
| 15. | "The Hat Returns/End Credits" | Includes Jurassic Park Theme by John Williams | | 5:10 |
| 16. | "Big Hat, No Cattle" | | Randy Newman | 4:26 |

== Original cue listing ==
The complete known cue list is as follows (including alternates):

1. "Isla Sorna Sailing Situation" - [4:22]
2. "The Dig Site (Unused)" - [1:07]
3. "They Were Smart" - [1:42]
4. "A Walk in the Park" - [1:21]
5. "Resonating Chamber" - [1:17]
6. "Alan Goes (Album Mix Ending)" - [1:54]
7. "Dinosaur Fly-By (Album)" - [2:12]
8. "What's a Bad Idea (Album)" - [1:03]
9. "Coopers Last Stand" - [1:43]
10. "We Haven't Landed Yet" - [0:40]
11. "Frenzy Fuselage (Album Mix)" - [3:12]
12. "Clash of Extinction (Unused)" - [1:42]
13. "The Kirby's Story" - [4:06]
14. "Bone Man Ben" - [3:38]
15. "Raptor Eggs" - [2:52]
16. "The Raptor Room" - [2:34]
17. "The Raptor Repartee" - [3:26]
18. "Eric Saves Alan" - [1:47]
19. "Tree People" - [2:02]
20. "Nash Calling" - [3:36]
21. "Party Crasher" - [3:17]
22. "Pteranodon Habitat" - [3:01]
23. "Tiny Pecking Pteranodons" - [3:23]
24. "Billy Oblivion" - [2:49]
25. "Brachiosaurus on the Bank" - [2:07]
26. "Reaching for Glory" - [2:31]
27. "Underwater Attack" - [2:11]
28. "Spinosaurus Confrontation" - [3:02]
29. "River Reminiscence" - [1:08]
30. "Ambush and Rescue" - [3:40]
31. "The Hat Returns - End Credits (Album)" - [5:22]
32. "Big Hat, No Cattle (Source)" - [4:26]
33. "Alan Goes (Film Mix)" - [1:50]
34. "Dinosaur Fly-By (Extended Film Version)" - [2:21]
35. "Coopers Last Stand (Film Alternate) " - [1:23]
36. "Frenzy Fuselage (Film Mix)" - [3:11]
37. "Raptor Room (Film/Extended Choir Section)" - [1:21]
38. "Pteranodon Habitat (Film Alternate)" - [3:24]
39. "Underwater Attack (Film Mix)" - [2:05]
40. "Spinosaurus Confrontation (Film Mix)" - [3:02]
41. "Ambush and Rescue (Film Mix)" - [3:42]
42. "End Credits Suite (Film Alternate)" - [8:43]

== Promotional score release ==
A promotional release of the score was gifted to friends of Don Davis and includes nearly the entire score. The promotional score's mix is narrow because of a direct downmix from the original 5.1 masters, without any correction or remixing for stereo performance.

Track Listing
| No. | Title | Writer(s) | Length |
|---|---|---|---|
| 1. | "Isla Sorna Sailing Situation" | Includes Jurassic Park Theme by John Williams | 4:22 |
| 2. | "Alan and Ellie" | Includes Jurassic Park Theme by John Williams | 1:42 |
| 3. | "Udesky, Nash and Cooper" | | 2:28 |
| 4. | "Montana (Unused)" | Includes Jurassic Park Theme by John Williams | 1:17 |
| 5. | "Alan Goes" | Includes Jurassic Park Theme by John Williams | 1:54 |
| 6. | "Dinosaur Fly-By" | Includes Jurassic Park Theme by John Williams | 2:12 |
| 7. | "Cooper's Last Stand" | Includes Jurassic Park Theme by John Williams | 2:45 |
| 8. | "Frenzy Fuselage" | | 3:59 |
| 9. | "Clash of Extinction (Unused)" | Includes Jurassic Park Raptor Theme by John Williams | 1:40 |
| 10. | "Kirby Paint and Tile Plus" | | 4:06 |
| 11. | "Bone Man Ben" | | 3:38 |
| 12. | "Raptor Eggs" | | 2:52 |
| 13. | "The Raptor Room" | Includes Jurassic Park Raptor Theme by John Williams | 2:33 |
| 14. | "The Raptor Repartee" | Includes Jurassic Park Raptor Theme by John Williams | 3:26 |
| 15. | "Eric Saves Alan" | Includes Jurassic Park Theme by John Williams | 1:47 |
| 16. | "Tree People" | | 2:01 |
| 17. | "Nash Calling" | | 3:36 |
| 18. | "Party Crasher" | | 3:17 |
| 19. | "Pteranodon Habitat" | | 3:01 |
| 20. | "Tiny Pecking Pteranodons" | Includes Jurassic Park Raptor Theme by John Williams | 3:23 |
| 21. | "Billy Oblivion" | | 2:49 |
| 22. | "Brachiosaurus On the Bank" | Includes Jurassic Park Theme by John Williams | 2:07 |
| 23. | "Reaching For Glory" | | 2:31 |
| 24. | "Underwater Attack" | | 2:11 |
| 25. | "Spinosaurus Confrontation" | | 3:02 |
| 26. | "River Reminiscence (Unused)" | Includes Jurassic Park Theme by John Williams | 1:08 |
| 27. | "Ambush and Rescue" | | 3:40 |
| 28. | "The Hat Returns/ End Credits (Album)" | Includes Jurassic Park Theme by John Williams | 5:22 |

== See also ==
- Jurassic World: Original Motion Picture Soundtrack
