= Jurassic World (film score) =

Jurassic World: Original Motion Picture Soundtrack

Film score by Michael Giacchino
- Released: June 9, 2015
- Studios: Sony Scoring Stage, Culver City, CA
- Genre: Soundtrack
- Length: 1:17:05
- Label: Back Lot Music
- Producers: Michael Giacchino, Jake Voulgarides

Michael Giacchino chronology
Tomorrowland (2015)	Jurassic World: Original Motion Picture Soundtrack (2015)	Inside Out: Original Soundtrack (2015)

Professional ratings
Review scores
Source	Rating
Movie Wave	4/5 stars
AllMusic	4/5 stars
Filmtracks	4/5 stars

Jurassic World: Original Motion Picture Soundtrack is the film score to Jurassic World composed and arranged by Michael Giacchino. The album was released digitally and physically on June 9, 2015 by Back Lot Music.

== Background ==
Giacchino previously scored the video games Warpath: Jurassic Park and The Lost World: Jurassic Park. The score also includes the Jurassic Park theme by John Williams. Giacchino stated: "It was a really targeted approach, as to where to [include Williams' themes] and where would make the most sense and where would we most appreciate it, as fans ourselves".

== Track listing ==
All music is composed by Michael Giacchino, except where noted. There are various instances throughout the score that contain hints to previous themes composed by Williams. These include the end of "Gyrosphere of Influence" which references the theme from Jurassic Park, as well as both "Costa Rican Standoff" and "Our Rex is Bigger Than Yours" that reference motifs used in Jurassic Park's sequel, The Lost World: Jurassic Park. The track "Raptor Your Heart Out" also briefly features a cue composed by Giacchino for the video game adaptation of The Lost World: Jurassic Park. The score was performed by the Hollywood Studio Symphony, with Tim Simonec orchestrating and conducting, with Jeff Kryka, Susie Bench, Peter Boyer, Brad Dechter, Mark Gasbarro, Norman Ludwin, Cameron Patrick and Chris Tilton serving as additional orchestrators. There are many tracks that were not included in the official soundtrack, such as the music played during the scene at the Jurassic Park Visitors Center, which features a piano rendition of the original Jurassic Park theme. These tracks are included in the film's complete score, which was unofficially released on December 31, 2016.

No.	Title	Writer(s)	Length
1.	"Bury the Hatchling"		1:56
2.	"The Family That Strays Together"		1:00
3.	"Welcome to Jurassic World" (includes Jurassic Park theme by John Williams)		2:08
4.	"As the Jurassic World Turns" (includes Jurassic Park theme by John Williams)		5:30
5.	"Clearly His First Rodeo"		3:28
6.	"Owen You Nothing"		1:19
7.	"Indominus Wrecks"		6:11
8.	"Gyrosphere of Influence"		3:14
9.	"Pavane For a Dead Apatosaurus"		4:44
10.	"Fits and Jumpstarts"		1:31
11.	"The Dimorphodon Shuffle"		2:13
12.	"Love in the Time of Pterosauria"		4:30
13.	"Chasing the Dragons"		2:54
14.	"Raptor Your Heart Out"		3:50
15.	"Costa Rican Standoff" (includes Jurassic Park theme by John Williams)		4:37
16.	"Our Rex Is Bigger Than Yours"		2:41
17.	"Growl and Make Up"		1:16
18.	"Nine to Survival Job"		2:33
19.	"The Park Is Closed" (includes Jurassic Park theme by John Williams)		1:38
20.	"Jurassic World Suite"		12:53
21.	"It's a Small Jurassic World"		1:43
22.	"The Hammond Lab Overture"		1:07
23.	"The Brockway Monorail"		1:45
24.	"Sunrise O'er Jurassic World"	Griffin Giacchino	2:06
Total length:			1:17:05

== Charts ==
Chart (2015)	Peak position
US Billboard 200	126
US Billboard Soundtracks	6

== See also ==
- Jurassic Park (film score)
- The Lost World: Jurassic Park (film score)
- Jurassic Park III (film score)
