= Jurassic Park (film score) =

Jurassic Park: Original Motion Picture Soundtrack

Film score by John Williams
- Released: May 25, 1993
- Recorded: March – April 1993
- Studios: Sony Scoring Stage, Culver City, CA
- Genre: Film score
- Length: 1:10:14
- Label: MCA
- Producer: John Williams

John Williams chronology
Home Alone 2 (1992)	Jurassic Park: Original Motion Picture Soundtrack (1993)	Schindler's List (1993)

Audio sample
- Excerpt from "Journey To The Island" containing the "Theme from Jurassic Park": file; help

Professional ratings
Review scores
Source	Rating
AllMusic	3/5 stars
Filmtracks	5/5 stars
Movie Wave	5/5 stars
Philadelphia Inquirer	2/4 stars

Jurassic Park: Original Motion Picture Soundtrack is the film score to the 1993 Steven Spielberg film Jurassic Park, composed and conducted by John Williams, and performed by the Hollywood Studio Symphony. Alexander Courage, John Neufeld, Conrad Pope, Aimee Vereecke and Dennis Dreith served as orchestrators.

MCA Records released a soundtrack album for the film on May 25, 1993. Also produced by Williams, this album includes most of the film's major cues, sometimes edited together into longer tracks and often containing material that was unused in the film. Several passages are also repeated in different tracks. A 20th anniversary edition of the soundtrack was released by Geffen Records on April 9, 2013, featuring additional unreleased music. A John Williams collection edition, joint with the soundtrack to The Lost World, was released by La-La Land Records on November 29, 2016, remastered and featuring more additional unreleased music. The score received critical acclaim and is often considered to be one of the most iconic and beloved scores of Williams' career.

== Composition ==
Williams began writing the Jurassic Park score at the end of February 1993, and it was conducted a month later; because Williams sustained a back injury during the scoring sessions, several cues were conducted by Artie Kane (Kane is uncredited in the film, but receives special thanks in the 1993 soundtrack album's credits and is listed as a conductor in the La-La Land Records set). The score was orchestrated by Alexander Courage, John Neufeld, Conrad Pope, Aimee Vereecke and Dennis Dreith. The composition process was done in Skywalker Ranch concurrently with the sound editing process, leading Williams to get inspiration from Gary Rydstrom's work with dinosaur noises. Williams described it as, "a rugged, noisy effort—a massive job of symphonic cartooning". He also said that, while trying to, "match the rhythmic gyrations of the dinosaurs", he ended up creating, "these kind of funny ballets". As with another Spielberg film he scored, Close Encounters of the Third Kind, Williams felt he needed to write, "pieces that would convey a sense of 'awe' and fascination", given that the movie dealt with the, "overwhelming happiness and excitement", that would emerge from seeing live dinosaurs. In turn, more suspenseful scenes, such as the Tyrannosaurus rex attack, earned frightening themes. For the first time, Spielberg was unable to attend the recording sessions for one of his own movies, as he was in Poland filming Schindler's List. Instead, Williams gave Spielberg demo tapes with piano versions of the main themes prior to his travel, and the director would listen to them daily on the way to the sets.

The score uses a large orchestra that often includes a variety of percussion, two harps, baritone horns, and choir. Some passages also call for unusual woodwinds, such as shakuhachi and E♭ piccolo oboe. Furthermore, Williams included synthesizers in much of the score. Some cues, such as "Dennis Steals the Embryos", feature them prominently, but many of the synth passages are mixed much more quietly, often doubling the woodwinds or helping flesh out the lower harmonies. Several prominent celeste solos (such as in "Remembering Petticoat Lane") are also performed on synthesizers.

=== Themes ===
Two major melodic ideas can be heard in this score.

The first motif, which is heard most frequently, is known simply as "Theme from Jurassic Park" and is introduced when the visitors first see the Brachiosaurus. This is what Williams chose to be the theme of the park itself and features "gentle religioso cantilena lines", which Williams declared was an attempt, "to capture the awesome beauty and sublimity of the dinosaurs in nature". This theme is widely regarded as one of John Williams' greatest. There are a couple different variants of "Theme from Jurassic Park". One is an extended version, heard in "Welcome to Jurassic Park". The second is a shorter, more tender version heard in various parts of the film. It revolves around a softer version of the theme's climax. This softer version was slightly modified and used for the track "A Tree for My Bed".

Another theme, "Journey to the Island", takes the form of a noble fanfare. It is first heard as the helicopter approaches Isla Nublar. The composer described it as an, "adventure theme, high-spirited and brassy, thrilling and upbeat musically". The original version of "Journey to the Island" also consists of "Theme from Jurassic Park". Variations of "Theme from Jurassic Park" and "Journey to the Island" are used for the score's quieter, more tender moments, typically with woodwinds, horns, or keyboards. Williams stated that these leitmotifs were reused in order to make the pieces become an overarching theme for the park itself, "which could be used in several different places, and when orchestrated differently, could convey the beauty of what they were seeing at first".

A third theme was also composed and is very different from the main two. Comprising four menacing notes, it is heard frequently in scenes involving the threat of the carnivorous dinosaurs—the raptors in particular. The cue "Into the Kitchen" (entitled "The Raptor Attack" on the original soundtrack) explores this motif extensively. The motif drew inspiration from Williams' previous suspense music, such as the shark motif from Jaws, and utilized "wild orchestral and choral things; the idea was to shake the floor and scare everybody". This theme also features the ending of "Journey to the Island" as its finale. Williams described it as, "operatic in a dramatic way", and an opportunity for him to emphasize the, "swashbuckling aspects of the orchestra".

== Track listing ==
No.	Title	Length
1.	"Opening Titles"	0:33
2.	"Theme from Jurassic Park"	3:27
3.	"Incident at Isla Nublar"	5:20
4.	"Journey to the Island"	8:52
5.	"The Raptor Attack"	2:49
6.	"Hatching Baby Raptor"	3:20
7.	"Welcome to Jurassic Park"	7:54
8.	"My Friend, the Brachiosaurus"	4:16
9.	"Dennis Steals the Embryo"	4:55
10.	"A Tree for My Bed"	2:12
11.	"High-Wire Stunts"	4:08
12.	"Remembering Petticoat Lane"	2:48
13.	"Jurassic Park Gate"	2:03
14.	"Eye to Eye"	6:32
15.	"T-Rex Rescue and Finale"	7:39
16.	"End Credits"	3:26

Note: The track "End Credits" is an excerpt from "Welcome to Jurassic Park", the film's actual end credits music.

== 20th Anniversary Edition ==
For the 20th anniversary of the film's release, the score was re-released digitally by Geffen Records on April 9, 2013. This re-release included four bonus tracks personally selected by John Williams.

No.	Title	Length
1.	"Opening Titles"	0:32
2.	"Theme from Jurassic Park"	3:25
3.	"Incident at Isla Nublar"	5:18
4.	"Journey to the Island"	8:53
5.	"The Raptor Attack"	2:48
6.	"Hatching Baby Raptor"	3:19
7.	"Welcome to Jurassic Park"	7:53
8.	"My Friend, the Brachiosaurus"	4:13
9.	"Dennis Steals the Embryo"	5:01
10.	"A Tree for My Bed"	2:09
11.	"High-Wire Stunts"	4:08
12.	"Remembering Petticoat Lane"	2:46
13.	"Jurassic Park Gate"	2:01
14.	"Eye to Eye"	6:31
15.	"T-Rex Rescue and Finale"	7:41
16.	"End Credits"	3:24
17.	"The History Lesson"	2:28
18.	"Stalling Around"	2:32
19.	"The Coming Storm"	3:58
20.	"Hungry Raptor"	2:05

== John Williams Collection Edition ==
The score, along with that of The Lost World: Jurassic Park, was remastered and re-released by La-La Land Records on November 29, 2016. This 4-CD re-release included expanded tracks of John Williams' original motion picture score to the film along with the four bonus tracks from the 20th Anniversary Edition. The set was only limited to 5,000 copies and is out of print.

Disc 1
No.	Title	Length
1.	"Opening Titles"	0:38
2.	"Incident at Isla Nublar" (film version)	2:25
3.	"The Encased Mosquito"	1:16
4.	"Entrance of Mr. Hammond"	1:10
5.	"Journey to the Island"	8:56
6.	"Hatching Baby Raptor" (film version)	2:05
7.	"You Bred Raptors?"	0:40
8.	"The History Lesson" (film version)	1:34
9.	"Jurassic Park Gate"	2:05
10.	"Goat Bait"	2:26
11.	"The Saboteur"	0:48
12.	"Ailing Triceratops"	2:36
13.	"The Coming Storm" (film version)	1:26
14.	"Dennis Steals the Embryo"	5:05
15.	"Race to the Dock"	1:18
16.	"The Falling Car and The T-Rex Chase"	4:59
17.	"A Tree for My Bed"	2:14
18.	"Remembering Petticoat Lane"	2:49
19.	"My Friend, the Brachiosaurus" (film version)	1:51
20.	"Life Finds a Way"	1:26
Total length:		47:46

Disc 2
No.	Title	Length
1.	"System Ready"	0:49
2.	"To the Maintenance Shed"	4:12
3.	"High Wire Stunts"	4:10
4.	"Hungry Raptor"	2:09
5.	"The Raptor Attack"	2:51
6.	"T-Rex Rescue and Finale"	7:43
7.	"Welcome to Jurassic Park"	7:58
8.	"Theme from Jurassic Park"	3:34
9.	"Stalling Around"	2:36
10.	"Welcome to Jurassic Park" (film version)	8:01
Total length:		44:04

== Expanded Edition ==
La-La Land Records also re-issued the album on July 5, 2022, which included both the tracks from the John Williams Collection Edition and remastered edition of the original soundtrack album.

Disc 1: Score Presentation
No.	Title	Length
1.	"Opening Titles"	0:37
2.	"Incident at Isla Nublar (Film version)"	2:23
3.	"The Encased Mosquito"	1:16
4.	"Entrance of Mr. Hammond"	1:09
5.	"Journey to the Island (Film version)"	8:54
6.	"Hatching Baby Raptor (Film version)"	2:04
7.	"You Bred Raptors?"	0:40
8.	"The History Lesson (Film version)"	1:33
9.	"Jurassic Park Gate"	2:05
10.	"Goat Bait"	2:26
11.	"The Saboteur"	0:47
12.	"Ailing Triceratops"	2:57
13.	"The Coming Storm (Film version)"	1:26
14.	"Dennis Steals the Embryo (Film version)"	5:04
15.	"Race to the Dock"	1:18
16.	"The Falling Car and The T-Rex Chase"	4:59
17.	"A Tree for My Bed"	2:15
18.	"Remembering Petticoat Lane"	2:49
19.	"My Friend, the Brachiosaurus (Film version)"	1:51
20.	"Life Finds a Way"	1:27
21.	"System Ready"	0:50
22.	"To the Maintenance Shed"	4:13
23.	"High Wire Stunts"	4:10
24.	"Hungry Raptor"	2:10
25.	"The Raptor Attack"	2:50
26.	"T-Rex Rescue and Finale"	7:43
27.	"Welcome to Jurassic Park (Film version)"	7:58
Total length:		77:44

Disc 2: 1993 Original Soundtrack
No.	Title	Length
1.	"Opening Titles (Original)"	0:33
2.	"Theme from Jurassic Park (Original)"	3:27
3.	"Incident at Isla Nublar (Original)"	5:20
4.	"Journey to the Island (Original)"	8:52
5.	"The Raptor Attack (Original)"	2:49
6.	"Hatching Baby Raptor (Original)"	3:20
7.	"Welcome to Jurassic Park (Original)"	7:54
8.	"My Friend, the Brachiosaurus (Original)"	4:16
9.	"Dennis Steals the Embryo (Original)"	4:55
10.	"A Tree for My Bed (Original)"	2:12
11.	"High Wire Stunts (Original)"	4:08
12.	"Remembering Petticoat Lane (Original)"	2:48
13.	"Jurassic Park Gate (Original)"	2:03
14.	"Eye to Eye (Original)"	6:32
15.	"T-Rex Rescue and Finale (Original)"	7:39
16.	"End Credits (Original)"	3:26
17.	"Stalling Around"	2:41
Total length:		73:35

== Charts ==
Year	Chart	Peak position
1993	US Billboard 200	28

== Certifications ==
Region	Certification	Certified units/sales
United States (RIAA)	Gold	500,000^{^}
^{^} Shipments figures based on certification alone.

== See also ==
- John Williams
- The Lost World: Jurassic Park (film score)
- Jurassic Park III (film score)
- Jurassic World (film score)
