= Michael Giacchino discography =

This is the discography of Michael Giacchino, an American composer.

== Films ==
=== 1990s ===
Year	Title	Director	Studio(s)	Notes
1997	Legal Deceit	Monika Harris	Portman Entertainment Group; Spectrum Films; Sweaty Palm Productions	—N/a
1999	My Brother the Pig	Erik Fleming	Brimstone Entertainment; Ardusty Home Entertainment; Unapix Productions	—N/a

=== 2000s ===
Year	Title	Director	Studio(s)	Notes
2001	The Trouble with Lou	Gregor Joackim	Cinetic Rights Management; Two Loose Cannons	—N/a
2003	Sin	Michael Stevens	Columbia TriStar Home Entertainment; Leyrer/Stevens Entertainment	—N/a
2004	The Incredibles	Brad Bird	Walt Disney Pictures; Pixar Animation Studios	Nominated for a Grammy Award for Best Score Soundtrack Album; Nominated for a Grammy Award for Best Instrumental Composition; Replaced John Barry; The first score for an animated film. Also score producer.
2005	Sky High	Mike Mitchell	Walt Disney Pictures; Gunn Films	Score composed with Trevor Rabin
2005	The Muppets' Wizard of Oz	Kirk Thatcher	The Muppets Holding Company; The Jim Henson Company; Fox Television Studios; Touchstone Television	TV movie
2005	The Family Stone	Thomas Bezucha	20th Century Fox; Fox 2000 Pictures	—N/a
2006	Looking for Comedy in the Muslim World	Albert Brooks	Warner Independent Pictures; Seventh Picture Productions; Kintop Pictures; Shangri-La Entertainment; THINKFilm	—N/a
2006	Mission: Impossible III	J. J. Abrams	Paramount Pictures; Cruise/Wagner Productions	Original Mission: Impossible themes by Lalo Schifrin
2007	Ratatouille	Brad Bird	Walt Disney Pictures; Pixar Animation Studios	Grammy Award for Best Score Soundtrack Album; Nominated for an Academy Award for Best Original Score
2008	Cloverfield	Matt Reeves	Paramount Pictures; Bad Robot	Credited as "Written by" Only composed "Roar!" for ending credits
2008	Speed Racer	The Wachowskis	Warner Bros. Pictures; Village Roadshow Pictures; Silver Pictures; Anarchos Productions	“Speed Racer” Theme by Nobuyoshi Koshibe & Peter Fernandez
2009	Star Trek	J. J. Abrams	Paramount Pictures; Spyglass Entertainment; Bad Robot	"Star Trek Theme" by Alexander Courage; Nominated for a Grammy Award for Best Score Soundtrack Album
2009	Up	Pete Docter	Walt Disney Pictures; Pixar Animation Studios	Academy Award for Best Original Score; BAFTA Award for Best Music; Grammy Award for Best Score Soundtrack Album; Grammy Award for Best Instrumental Composition; Golden Globe Award for Best Original Score – Up
2009	Land of the Lost	Brad Silberling	Universal Pictures; Relativity Media; Sid & Marty Krofft Pictures; Mosaic Media Group	—N/a
2009	Earth Days	Robert Stone	Zeitgeist Films; American Experience; Robert Stone Productions	Documentary film

=== 2010s ===
Year	Title	Director	Studio(s)	Notes
2010	Let Me In	Matt Reeves	Overture Films; Relativity Media (US); Paramount Pictures; Icon Film Distribution (UK); Hammer Films; Exclusive Media Group	—N/a
2011	Cars 2	John Lasseter	Walt Disney Pictures; Pixar Animation Studios	—N/a
2011	Super 8	J. J. Abrams	Paramount Pictures; Bad Robot; Amblin Entertainment	—N/a
2011	Monte Carlo	Thomas Bezucha	20th Century Fox; Fox 2000 Pictures; Regency Enterprises; Di Novi Pictures; Dune Entertainment; Blossom Films	—N/a
2011	50/50	Jonathan Levine	Summit Entertainment (US); Lionsgate (International); Mandate Pictures; Point Grey Pictures	—N/a
2011	Mission: Impossible – Ghost Protocol	Brad Bird	Paramount Pictures; Skydance Productions; TC Productions; Bad Robot	Original Mission: Impossible themes by Lalo Schifrin
2012	John Carter	Andrew Stanton	Walt Disney Pictures	—N/a
2013	Star Trek Into Darkness	J. J. Abrams	Paramount Pictures; Bad Robot; Skydance Productions; K/O Paper Products	"Star Trek Theme" by Alexander Courage
2014	Dawn of the Planet of the Apes	Matt Reeves	20th Century Fox; Chernin Entertainment	—N/a
2014	This Is Where I Leave You	Shawn Levy	Warner Bros. Pictures; Spring Creek Productions; 21 Laps Entertainment	—N/a
2015	Jupiter Ascending	The Wachowskis	Warner Bros. Pictures; Village Roadshow Pictures; RatPac-Dune Entertainment; Anarchos Productions	—N/a
2015	Tomorrowland	Brad Bird	Walt Disney Pictures; A113 Productions	—N/a
2015	Jurassic World	Colin Trevorrow	Universal Pictures; Amblin Entertainment; Legendary Pictures	"Jurassic Park Theme" by John Williams
2015	Inside Out	Pete Docter	Walt Disney Pictures; Pixar Animation Studios	—N/a
2016	Zootopia	Byron Howard; Rich Moore	Walt Disney Pictures; Walt Disney Animation Studios	—N/a
2016	Star Trek Beyond	Justin Lin	Paramount Pictures; Skydance Media; Bad Robot; Sneaky Shark Productions; Perfect Storm Entertainment	"Star Trek Theme" by Alexander Courage
2016	Doctor Strange	Scott Derrickson	Walt Disney Studios Motion Pictures; Marvel Studios	—N/a
2016	Rogue One: A Star Wars Story	Gareth Edwards	Walt Disney Studios Motion Pictures; Lucasfilm Ltd.	Replaced Alexandre Desplat; Original Star Wars themes by John Williams
2017	The Book of Henry	Colin Trevorrow	Focus Features; Sidney Kimmel Entertainment; Double Nickel Entertainment	—N/a
2017	Spider-Man: Homecoming	Jon Watts	Columbia Pictures; Marvel Studios; Pascal Pictures	"Theme From Spider-Man 1960s Series" by Paul Francis Webster and Robert "Bob" Harris "The Avengers Theme" by Alan Silvestri
2017	War for the Planet of the Apes	Matt Reeves	20th Century Fox; Chernin Entertainment	—N/a
2017	Coco	Lee Unkrich	Walt Disney Pictures; Pixar Animation Studios	Score composed with Germaine Franco as additional composer, with songs by Adrian Molina, Kristen Anderson-Lopez and Robert Lopez
2018	Incredibles 2	Brad Bird	Walt Disney Pictures; Pixar Animation Studios	—N/a
2018	Jurassic World: Fallen Kingdom	J. A. Bayona	Universal Pictures; Amblin Entertainment; Legendary Pictures; Perfect World Pictures	First J. A. Bayona film not to be composed by Fernando Velázquez "Jurassic Park Theme" by John Williams
2018	Bad Times at the El Royale	Drew Goddard	20th Century Fox; Goddard Textiles	—N/a
2019	Spider-Man: Far From Home	Jon Watts	Columbia Pictures; Marvel Studios; Pascal Pictures	"The Avengers Theme" by Alan Silvestri
2019	Jojo Rabbit	Taika Waititi	Fox Searchlight Pictures; Defender Films; Piki Films	—N/a

=== 2020s ===
Year	Title	Director	Studio(s)	Notes
2020	An American Pickle	Brandon Trost	Warner Bros. Pictures; Warner Max; Point Grey Pictures	Original themes and “Pickles, Suite or Sour” composed by Giacchino, score by Nami Melumad.
2020	Let Him Go	Thomas Bezucha	Focus Features (US); Universal Pictures (International); The Mazur Kaplan Company	—N/a
2021	Extinct	David Silverman	Netflix; China Lion; HB Wink Animation; Huayi Brothers; Tolerable Entertainment; Cinesite	Score composed with Mick Giacchino
2021	Spider-Man: No Way Home	Jon Watts	Columbia Pictures; Marvel Studios; Pascal Pictures	"Tobey Maguire Spider-Man Theme" by Danny Elfman "Doc Ock Theme" by Danny Elfman "Green Goblin Theme" by Danny Elfman "Andrew Garfield Spider-Man Theme" by James Horner "Electro Theme" by Hans Zimmer "Doctor Strange Theme" by Michael Giacchino
2022	The Batman	Matt Reeves	Warner Bros. Pictures; DC Films; 6th & Idaho; Dylan Clark Productions	"Something in the Way" by Nirvana
2022	Jurassic World Dominion	Colin Trevorrow	Universal Pictures; Amblin Entertainment; Perfect World Pictures	"Jurassic Park Theme" by John Williams
2022	Doctor Strange in the Multiverse of Madness	Sam Raimi	Walt Disney Studios Motion Pictures; Marvel Studios	Original themes only. Score by Danny Elfman
2022	Lightyear	Angus MacLane	Walt Disney Pictures; Pixar Animation Studios	—N/a
2022	Thor: Love and Thunder	Taika Waititi	Walt Disney Studios Motion Pictures; Marvel Studios	Original themes included. Score composed with Nami Melumad
2023	Society of the Snow	J. A. Bayona	Netflix; Misión de Audaces Films; El Arriero Films	First score for a film in Spanish
2023	Next Goal Wins	Taika Waititi	Searchlight Pictures	—N/a
2024	IF	John Krasinski	Paramount Pictures; Sunday Night Productions; Maximum Effort	—N/a
2024	Inside Out 2	Kelsey Mann	Walt Disney Pictures; Pixar Animation Studios	Score producer, additional orchestrations and original themes only. Score by Andrea Datzman
2024	Getting Lost	Taylor Morden	PopMotion Pictures	The Lost documentary
2025	Thunderbolts*	Jake Schreier	Walt Disney Studios Motion Pictures; Marvel Studios	Post-credits scene only. Score composed by Son Lux
2025	The Fantastic Four: First Steps	Matt Shakman	Walt Disney Studios Motion Pictures; Marvel Studios	—N/a
2025	Zootopia 2	Jared Bush; Byron Howard	Walt Disney Pictures; Walt Disney Animation Studios	Also score producer.
2026	Spider-Man: Brand New Day	Destin Daniel Cretton	Columbia Pictures; Marvel Studios; Pascal Pictures	—N/a
2026	The End of Oak Street	David Robert Mitchell	Warner Bros. Pictures; Bad Robot; Jackson Pictures	Also score producer.
2026	Klara and the Sun	Taika Waititi	Columbia Pictures; 3000 Pictures; Spyglass Media Group; Heyday Films; Defender Films; Piki Films	—N/a
2026	Behemoth!	Tony Gilroy	Searchlight Pictures	Score composed with James Newton Howard, Alan Silvestri, Brandon Roberts, Michael Abels, Emily Bear, Lukas Frank, Henry Jackman, and Nami Melumad
2026	Ray Gunn	Brad Bird	Netflix; Skydance Animation	—N/a
2027	High in the Clouds	Toby Genkel	Gaumont Animation; MPL Communications; Unique Features; PolyGram Entertainment	Songs by Paul McCartney
2028	The Batman: Part II	Matt Reeves	Warner Bros. Pictures; DC Studios; 6th & Idaho; Dylan Clark Productions	—N/a

== Television series ==
Title	Year	Produced by	Notes
Alias	2001–2006	Bad Robot; Touchstone Television / ABC Studios	—N/a
Lost	2004–2010	Bad Robot; Touchstone Television / ABC Studios	—N/a
Six Degrees	2006–2007	Bad Robot; Touchstone Television / ABC Studios	—N/a
Fringe	2008	Bad Robot; Warner Bros. Television	Co-composer of the first season with Chris Tilton and Chad Seiter
Undercovers	2010	Bad Robot; Warner Bros. Television	Pilot only
Alcatraz	2012	Bad Robot; Warner Bros. Television	Pilot only
Star Trek: Short Treks	2019	Roddenberry Entertainment; Paramount+	Supervising composer for season 2 only; Composer and director for episode "Ephraim and DOT"
Jurassic World Camp Cretaceous	2020–2022	Universal Pictures; DreamWorks Animation Television; Amblin Entertainment; Netflix	Jurassic World theme only, Jurassic Park theme by John Williams. Score by Leo Birenberg.
Star Trek: Prodigy	2021–2024	Nickelodeon Animation Studio; Roddenberry Entertainment; Paramount+ (Season 1); Netflix (Season 2)	Main theme only. Score by Nami Melumad.
Zootopia+	2022	Walt Disney Animation Studios; Disney+	Composer and songwriter for episode: "Duke: the Musical".
The Penguin	2024	DC Studios; Warner Bros. Television; HBO	Score producer only. Score by Mick Giacchino.
Star Wars: Skeleton Crew	2024–2025	Lucasfilm; Golem Creations; Disney+	Score producer only. Score by Mick Giacchino.

== Short films and holiday specials ==
Title	Year	Notes
No Salida	1998	Short film
String Of The Kite	2003	Short film
The Karate Guard	2005	Short film
One Man Band	2005	Short film
Lifted	2006	Short film
How to Hook Up Your Home Theater	2007	Short film
Partly Cloudy	2009	Short film
Dug's Special Mission	2009	Short film (edited from Up)
Prep & Landing	2009	TV Christmas Special
Day & Night	2010	Short film
Prep & Landing: Operation: Secret Santa	2010	Short film
The Ballad of Nessie	2011	Short film
Prep & Landing: Naughty vs. Nice	2011	TV Christmas special
La Luna	2011	Short film
Toy Story of Terror!	2013	TV Halloween special
Toy Story That Time Forgot	2014	TV Christmas special
Riley's First Date?	2015	Short film
Dante's Lunch	2017	Short film
Werewolf by Night	2022	TV Halloween special
765874 – Unification	2024	Short film
Cardboard	2025	Short film
Prep & Landing: The Snowball Protocol	2025	Original themes only. Score by Christopher Willis

== Video games ==
Title	Year	Notes
Mickey Mania: The Timeless Adventures of Mickey Mouse	1994	Additional compositions
Gargoyles	1995	—N/a
Maui Mallard in Cold Shadow	1995	—N/a
The Lost World: Jurassic Park	1997	—N/a
Chaos Island: The Lost World	1997	—N/a
Small Soldiers	1998	—N/a
T'ai Fu: Wrath of the Tiger	1999	—N/a
Warpath: Jurassic Park	1999	—N/a
Medal of Honor	1999	Also score producer.
Muppet Monster Adventure	2000	—N/a
Medal of Honor: Underground	2000	Also score producer.
Medal of Honor: Allied Assault	2002	Also score producer and orchestrator.
Medal of Honor: Frontline	2002	Also score producer and orchestrator.
Call of Duty	2003	Also score producer and additional orchestrator.
Secret Weapons Over Normandy	2003	—N/a
Medal of Honor: Rising Sun	2003	Attract loop, storyboard composer and original themes only. Score by Christopher Lennertz
Call of Duty: United Offensive	2004	Expansion pack
Call of Duty: Finest Hour	2004	—N/a
Alias	2004	—N/a
The Incredibles	2004	Console/PC versions only, composed with Chris Tilton
Medal of Honor: Pacific Assault	2004	Score producer and original themes only. Score by Christopher Lennertz
Mercenaries: Playground of Destruction	2005	Composed with Chris Tilton
The Incredibles: Rise of the Underminer	2005	Composed with Chris Tilton
Medal of Honor: European Assault	2005	Score producer and original themes only. Score by Christopher Lennertz
Black	2006	Main theme and score producer only. Score composed and conducted by Chris Tilton.
Medal of Honor: Vanguard	2007	Consisting of material from Allied Assault, Underground, Frontline and Airborne
Medal of Honor: Airborne	2007	Also score producer.
Medal of Honor: Heroes 2	2007	Previously released material
Lost: Via Domus	2008	—N/a
Turning Point: Fall of Liberty	2008	—N/a
Fracture	2008	Score producer only. Score composed by Chris Tilton and Chad Seiter
Up	2009	with Chad Seiter
Lego The Incredibles	2018	Themes only. Score composed by Simon Withenshaw.
Medal of Honor: Above and Beyond	2020	Original themes and original Medal of Honor music only. Score by Nami Melumad.

== Theme park attractions ==
Title	Year
Space Mountain at Disneyland	2005
Star Tours: The Adventures Continue at Disneyland, Disneyland Paris, Tokyo Disneyland and Disney's Hollywood Studios	2011
Ratatouille: L'Aventure Totalement Toquée de Rémy at Disney Adventure World and Epcot	2014
Incredicoaster at Disney California Adventure	2018
Inside Out Emotional Whirlwind at Disney California Adventure	2019
Jurassic World: The Ride at Universal Studios Hollywood	2019
Web Slingers: A Spider-Man Adventure at Disney California Adventure and Disney Adventure World	2021
Zootopia: Hot Pursuit at Shanghai Disneyland	2023
Zootopia: Better Zoogether! at Disney's Animal Kingdom	2025

== Other works ==
- We Have to Go Back: The LOST Concert (2019)
- Travelogue: Volume 1 (2020)
- Christmas Number One (2020), lyrics written with Elyssa Samsel and Kate Anderson
- Exotic Themes for the Silver Screen, Vol. 1 (2024)
- Exotic Themes for the Silver Screen, Vol. 2 (2025)
- HEADLESS: The Musical (2026), lyrics written with Elyssa Samsel and Kate Anderson
