= Spider-Man music =

Spider-Man music refers to the various scores and soundtracks created for various Spider-Man media. These include:

== Television ==
- Spider-Man (theme song), theme song of the 1967 cartoon show

== Film scores and soundtracks ==
- Spider-Man (score) (2002)
- Spider-Man (soundtrack) (2002)
- Spider-Man 2 (soundtrack) (2004)
- Spider-Man 3 (soundtrack) (2007)
- The Amazing Spider-Man (soundtrack) (2012)
- The Amazing Spider-Man 2 (soundtrack) (2014)
- Spider-Man: Homecoming (soundtrack) (2017)
- Spider-Man: Into the Spider-Verse (soundtrack) (2018)
- Spider-Man: Far From Home (soundtrack) (2019)
- Spider-Man: No Way Home (soundtrack) (2021)
- Spider-Man: Across the Spider-Verse (soundtrack) (2023)
- Spider-Man: Brand New Day (soundtrack) (2026)

== Other ==
- Spider-Man: Turn Off the Dark, Broadway musical
