= Spider-Man: No Way Home (soundtrack) =

Spider-Man: No Way Home (Original Motion Picture Soundtrack)

Film score by Michael Giacchino
- Released: December 17, 2021
- Genre: Film score
- Length: 73:54
- Label: Sony Classical

Michael Giacchino chronology
Extinct (2021)	Spider-Man: No Way Home (Original Motion Picture Soundtrack) (2021)	The Batman (2022)

Singles from Spider-Man: No Way Home
- 1. "Arachnoverture" Released: December 9, 2021; 2. "Exit Through the Lobby" Released: December 10, 2021

Spider-Man: No Way Home (Original Motion Picture Soundtrack) is the film score to the Columbia Pictures / Marvel Studios film Spider-Man: No Way Home composed by Michael Giacchino, conducted by Marshall Bowen and performed by the Hollywood Studio Symphony. The soundtrack album was released by Sony Classical on December 17, 2021.

== Background ==
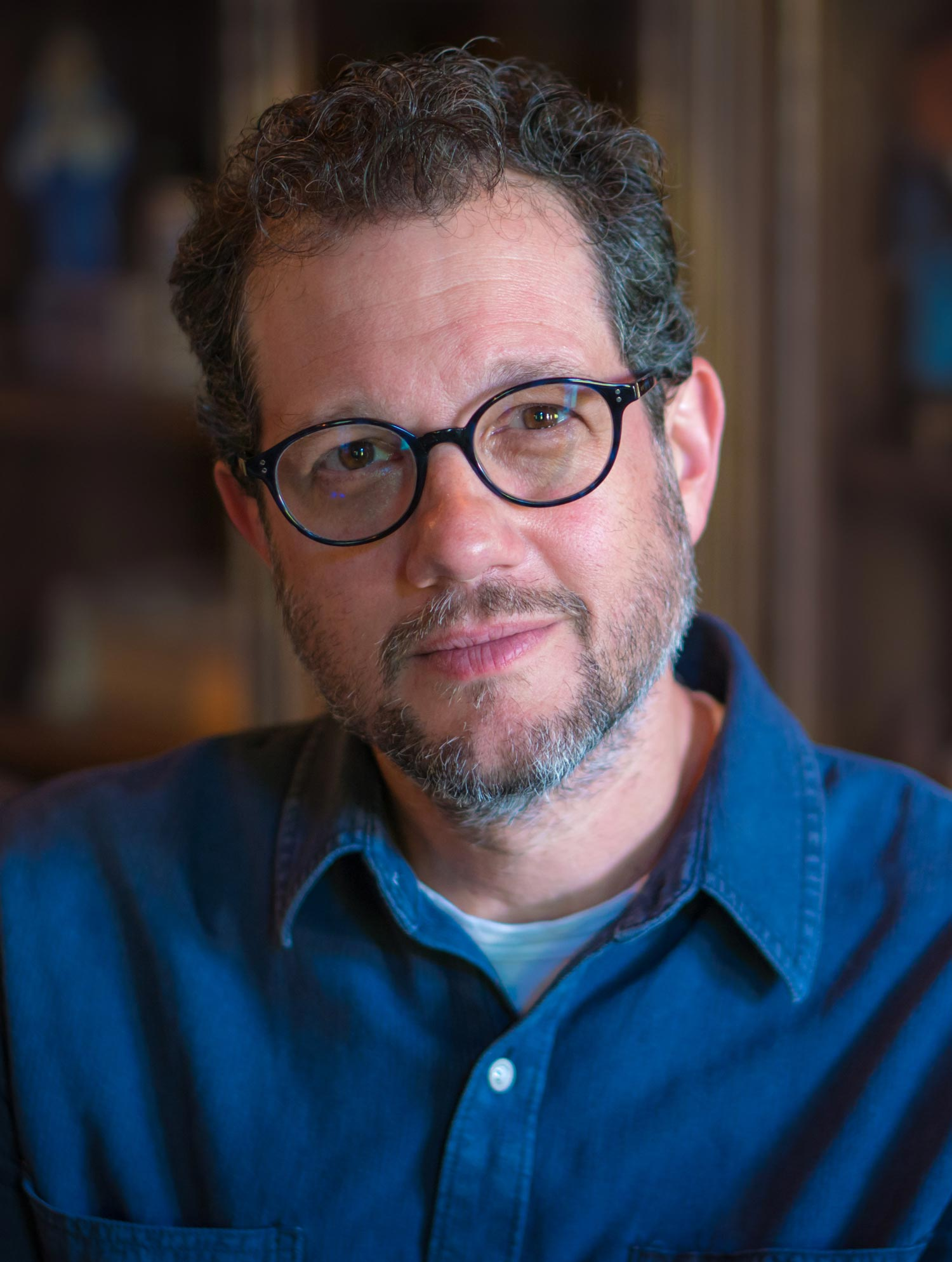
Michael Giacchino returned as film composer in November 2020

Spider-Man: Homecoming (2017) and Far From Home (2019) composer Michael Giacchino was confirmed to score No Way Home in November 2020. On December 9, a single titled "Arachnoverture" was released, with "Exit Through the Lobby" being released the following day. The soundtrack also features music from previous Spider-Man soundtracks by other film composers including Hans Zimmer, James Horner, Christopher Young and Danny Elfman, as well as Giacchino's theme for Doctor Strange (2016).

== Track listing ==
All music composed by Michael Giacchino, unless otherwise noted.

No.	Title	Length
1.	"Intro to Fake News"	1:11
2.	"World's Worst Friendly Neighbor"	0:52
3.	"Damage Control" ( (Note: This track references Giacchino's theme for Mysterio from Spider-Man: Far From Home (2019).))	2:17
4.	"Being a Spider Bites" ( (Note: This track references Giacchino's "Bridge and Love's Burning" from Spider-Man: Far From Home (2019).))	1:05
5.	"Gone in a Flash" ( (Note: This track references Giacchino's theme from Doctor Strange (2016).))	1:52
6.	"All Spell Breaks Loose"	3:25
7.	"Otto Trouble" ( (Note: This track references Danny Elfman's "Doc Ock is Born" from Spider-Man 2 (2004).))	4:19
8.	"Ghost Fighter in the Sky / Beach Blanket Bro Down"	2:47
9.	"Strange Bedfellows"	1:45
10.	"Sling vs Bling"	5:00
11.	"Octo Gone"	3:34
12.	"No Good Deed"	5:00
13.	"Exit Through the Lobby"	4:15
14.	"A Doom With a View"	2:00
15.	"Spider Baiting"	1:35
16.	"Liberty Parlance"	1:28
17.	"Monster Smash" ( (Note: This track references Christopher Young's Sandman Theme from Spider-Man 3 (2007).))	1:21
18.	"Arc Reactor" ( (Note: This track references Danny Elfman's "Enter the Goblin" from Spider-Man (2002).))	2:57
19.	"Shield of Pain" ( (Note: This track references James Horner's "Main Title – Young Peter" from The Amazing Spider-Man (2012) and Danny Elfman's "Main Title" from Spider-Man (2002).))	4:51
20.	"Goblin His Inner Demons"	3:54
21.	"Forget Me Knots"	6:49
22.	"Peter Parker Picked a Perilously Precarious Profession"	1:31
23.	"Arachnoverture"	10:06
Total length:		73:54

== Reception ==
In 2025, Lisa Laman of ComicBook.com listed the Spider-Man: No Way Home soundtrack as one of Giacchino's five best scores and especially praised Giacchinos intertwining of pre-existing Spider-Man musical motifs into his new compositions. Filmtracks.com gave the score a mixed review, judging the handling of the pre-existing material "proficient, but not spectacular", the new thematic material "opaque", and the mix "disengaged".

== Additional music ==
Several songs are featured in the film that are absent from the soundtrack album, including "I Zimbra" by Talking Heads, "Native New Yorker" by Odyssey, "Scraper" by Liquid Liquid, "No Sleep 'Til Brooklyn" by Beastie Boys, "Concerto for 2 Violins in G major, RV 516" by Antonio Vivaldi, "Deck the Halls" by Thomas Oliphant, and "The Magic Number" by De La Soul. "Bailando Cumbia" by Danny Osuna is featured in the mid-credits scene.

== Personnel ==
- Composer/Score Producer - Michael Giacchino
- Orchestra - The Hollywood Studio Symphony
- Orchestrators - Jeff Kryka, Curtis Green
- Conductor - Marshall Bowen
- Additional Music - Curtis Green, Griffy Giacchino
- Orchestral Manager - Reggie Wilson
- Score Mixer - Warren Brown
- Music Preparations - Booker White, Chris Anderson-Bazzoli, Nicholas Cazares, David Giull, Susie Benchasil Seiter, Karen Smith, Leslie Smith-Buttars, Alfredo Esparza
- Digital Score Recordist - Vincent Cirilli
- Music Contractors - Reggie Wilson, Connie Boylan
- Vocal Contractor and Vocalist - Vangie Gunn
- Score Coordinator - Mick Giacchino
- Music Coordinator - Shannon Murphy, Raven Davenport

== Charts ==
Chart performance for Spider-Man: No Way Home
Chart (2022)	Peak position
Belgian Albums (Ultratop Flanders)	60
