= Incredibles 2 (soundtrack) =

Incredibles 2 (Original Motion Picture Soundtrack)

Soundtrack album by Michael Giacchino
- Released: June 15, 2018
- Recorded: 2017–2018
- Genre: Film soundtrack
- Length: 1:14:50
- Label: Walt Disney
- Producer: Michael Giacchino

Michael Giacchino chronology
| Coco (2017) | Incredibles 2 (2018) | Jurassic World: Fallen Kingdom (2018) |

Incredibles 2 (Original Motion Picture Soundtrack) is the soundtrack album to the 2018 film Incredibles 2, the sequel to Pixar's The Incredibles (2004). The film is directed by Brad Bird and featured musical score composed by Michael Giacchino, who also worked on the predecessor. The recording of the score began during mid-2017 and continued till May 2018, at the Sony Scoring Stage in California. The soundtrack album was released digitally, alongside the film, on June 15, by Walt Disney Records and in CDs on June 29. The soundtrack featured Giacchino's scores as well as vocalized theme songs for Mr. Incredible, Elastigirl, and Frozone featured in the credits. The digital release also featured bonus versions of the theme songs sung by Disney's a cappella group, DCappella, and their version of the track "The Glory Days" from the predecessor.

== Background ==
In October 2015, Bird confirmed that his regular collaborator Michael Giacchino would return to score music for the sequel. By May 2017, Giacchino began working on the film score. However, in an interview to Collider, two months later, Giacchino said that he actually had not begun writing the score, but described the score as "it'll feel like the same universe but we'll go a couple new places here and there and I think you'll be happy. It's an incredibly fun, fun, fun follow-up. So I'm looking forward to seeing what comes out of it all." The scoring process delayed due to Giacchino's commitments with Spider-Man: Homecoming, War of the Planet of the Apes and Coco. In February 2018, work on the film's music began, with scoring held at Sony Scoring Stage in California. Giacchino shared few snippets from the recording sessions. Bird described on Giacchino's work as "he (Giacchino) brings a unique perspective to it and I almost think of him like another character or another actor on the film because he's interpreting the story and he has a very good storytelling sense, so his music always has a storytelling aspect." Giacchino's son Mick, worked on the film's additional music, and his daughter Grace, also co-wrote few themes. In April 2018, Preston Elliot and Nick McIlwain of the Preston & Steve band had performed a new theme song "Elastigirl Is Back", released alongside the film's soundtrack on June 15, 2018.

Like the first film, Giacchino used jazz and orchestral music for the score. The final recording sessions happened in May 2018, consisting of a 99-piece orchestra, conducted by Gordon Goodwin, and a brass-heavy band dominating the string section. Joel Iwataki arranged the orchestra, enabling the big band to perform "tight and grooving". He also collaborated with Alex Lacamoire, to amuse commercial jingles for the key characters: Mr. Incredible, Elastigirl and Frozone, which were written by Giacchino and Bird. In an interview for Variety, Giacchino said that writing lyrics for the jingles "as a crazy idea "It's as if, in that world, each of these characters had a TV show based on them and they know their own theme songs".

== Reception ==
The album received mixed reviews from critics. Jonathan Broxton wrote "If you like big band jazz and large, swinging orchestras in the [John] Barry/[Henry] Mancini tradition, then a great deal of The Incredibles 2 will be very entertaining. But, looking at it objectively, there are still a few little niggling issues in the finished product which stop it from being genuinely great, as opposed to merely good." Anton Smit of Soundtrack World wrote "The score itself is not very innovative since it is a continuation of the music from the first movie, but with that said, it also introduces some new melodies using the same vibe of the predecessor, like the new Elastigirl theme. There is still room for melodies, amazing build-ups to climaxes and fantastic musical patterns in action sequences."

Jim Patterson of MFiles wrote "Inevitably people will want to compare Incredibles 2 with the original score for The Incredibles since it made quite an impression with film music fans. In this respect the sequel as a stand alone album is perhaps just a tad disappointing against these high expectations. This is probably down to various factors outside the control of the composer. The original score album benefitted from longer tracks of continuous music. The sequel with generally shorter tracks offers more disjointed listening. This is a less satisfying experience and one wonders if the album may have benefitted from having some tracks combined into suites or smaller groups."

Filmtracks.com wrote "Incredibles 2 is a wholly functional score, but it doesn't play as memorably in the film despite its often stomping personality defined by far too obvious instrumental accents. The trumpet wailing and repeated ensemble hits in super-melodramatic caper fashion are simply too saturated throughout this score for it to serve as a parody that succeeds without begging for too much attention. The movie's Screenslaver hypnotism scenes forced Disney to release warnings about possible epileptic seizures amongst those in the audience so inclined, and Giacchino's score could have the same effect on your ears. It's technically more proficient in the genre than The Incredibles, but with that maturation of the composer came a willingness to revel shamelessly in his capability."

Zanobard Reviews gave a mixed response saying "the soundtrack to The Incredibles 2 is disappointing. It relies heavily on re-using the main theme from the first film, which while not being a bad thing does limit the score. The main theme is never expanded on or built on, being exactly the same as the first film. It does also get in the way of letting the new themes shine through, as while Elastigirl's and Screensaver's themes are great they do not get much time on the album. The action music also sounds like a poor imitation of the first film's and not a sequel that should by all rights (given that it is 14 years after the first) be building and expanding on the music from the first and not relying on it to boost it up."

== Track listing ==
| No. | Title | Writer(s) | Length |
|---|---|---|---|
| 1. | "Episode 2" | | 0:50 |
| 2. | "A Tony Perspective" | | 2:08 |
| 3. | "Consider Yourselves Undermined!" | | 5:12 |
| 4. | "A Matter of Perception" | | 1:50 |
| 5. | "Diggin' the New Digs" | | 1:42 |
| 6. | "This Ain't My Super-Suit?" | | 0:57 |
| 7. | "Elastigirl Is Back" | | 1:00 |
| 8. | "Train of Taut" | | 3:17 |
| 9. | "Rocky vs. Jack-Jack" | | 1:58 |
| 10. | "Ambassador Ambush" | | 2:29 |
| 11. | "Hero Worship" | | 1:08 |
| 12. | "Searching for a Screenslaver" | | 4:40 |
| 13. | "Super Legal Again" | | 0:42 |
| 14. | "Renouncing the Renunciation" | | 1:38 |
| 15. | "World's Worst Babysitters" | | 1:33 |
| 16. | "Helen of Ploy" | | 0:55 |
| 17. | "A Dash of Reality" | | 2:03 |
| 18. | "Hydrofoiled Again" | | 3:51 |
| 19. | "Jack Splat" | | 1:30 |
| 20. | "A Bridge Too Parr" | | 4:17 |
| 21. | "Together Forever and Deavor" | | 1:45 |
| 22. | "Elastigirl's Got a Plane to Catch" | | 3:00 |
| 23. | "Looks like I Picked the Wrong Week to Quit Oxygen" | | 1:59 |
| 24. | "Happily After-Deavor" | | 1:15 |
| 25. | "Out and a Bout" | | 0:36 |
| 26. | "Incredits 2" | | 9:51 |
| 27. | "Here Comes Elastigirl – Elastigirl's Theme" | Michael Giacchino | 1:23 |
| 28. | "Chill or Be Chilled – Frozone's Theme" | Brad Bird | 1:40 |
| 29. | "Pow! Pow! Pow! – Mr. Incredible's Theme" | Michael Giacchino | 1:31 |
| 30. | "Devtechno!" | | 1:53 |
| 31. | "Chad Tonight Talk Show Theme" | Daniel Farid; Grace Giacchino; Michael Giacchino | 0:05 |
| 32. | "Chad Tonight Newscast Bumper" | Farid; Grace; Michael | 0:06 |
| Total length: | | | 68:44 |

Bonus tracks
| No. | Title | Performer(s) | Length |
|---|---|---|---|
| 33. | "Here Comes Elastigirl – Elastigirl's Theme (A Cappella)" | DCappella | 1:20 |
| 34. | "Chill or Be Chilled – Frozone's Theme (A Cappella)" | DCappella | 1:36 |
| 35. | "Pow! Pow! Pow! – Mr. Incredible's Theme (A Cappella)" | DCappella | 1:31 |
| 36. | "The Glory Days (A Cappella)" | DCappella | 1:39 |
| Total length: | | | 74:50 |

== Personnel ==
Credits adapted from CD liner notes

- Original score composed and produced by – Michael Giacchino
- Original songs produced by – Alex Lacamoire, Michael Giacchino
- Additional music – Mick Giacchino, Daniel Farid (tracks: 31, 32), Grace Giacchino (tracks: 31, 32)
- Recording – Joel Iwataki, Keith Ukrisna, Tom Hardisty, Joey Raia
- Mixing – Joel Iwataki, Derik Lee
- Mastering – Patricia Sullivan
- Editing – Stephen M. Davis, Warren Brown, Alex Levy
- Vocalists – Alex Lacamoire, Carrie Manolakos, Michael Giacchino, Michael Mcelroy, Mykal Kilgore, Natalie Weiss
- Scoring assistants – David Coker
- Scoring crew – Brian Van Leer, David Marquette, Greg Dennen, Ryan Robinson
- Music preparation – Booker White, Curtis Green
- Music co-ordinator – Jimmy Tsai
- Digital assembly – Vincent Cirilli

Orchestra

- Orchestration – Gordon Goodwin, Jeff Kryka
- Additional orchestration – Alex Lacamoire, Ayatey Shabazz
- Concertmaster – Alyssa Park, Belinda Broughton
- Orchestra conductor – Marshall Bowen
- Orchestra contractor – Reggie Wilson, Connie Boylan
- Instrumentation:
- Bassoon – Kenneth Munday, Rose Corrigan (principal)
- Cello – Steve Richards (principal), Aniela Perry, Armen Ksajikian, Cameron Stone, Dane Little, Dermot Mulroney, Giovanna M. Clayton, John Acosta, Kevan Torfeh, Stefanie Fife, Suzie Katayama, Vahe Hayrikyan, Victor Lawrence
- Clarinet – Donald Foster (principal),
- Double bass – Dave Stone (principal), Chuck Nenneker, Karl Vincent, Michael Valerio, Nico Abondolo, Norman Ludwin, Oscar Hidalgo, Trey Henry
- Drums – Bernie Dresel, Jamie Eblen
- Electric Bass – Abraham Laboriel (principal), Richard Hammond
- Flute – Heather Clark (principal)
- French horn – Dave Everson (principal), Amy Jo Rhine, Amy Sanchez, Andrew Bain, Brad Warnaar, Daniel Kelley, Dylan Hart, Jenny Kim, Joe Meyer, Katelyn Faraudo, Mark Adams, Steven Becknell, Teag Reaves
- Guitar – George Doering (principal), Michael Aarons
- Harp – Gayle Levant (principal)
- Keyboards – Mark Levang
- Oboe – Lara Wickes (principal)
- Percussion – Dan Greco (principal), Alex Acuña, Emil Richards, Rolando Morales-Matos, Walter Rodriguez
- Piano – Mark Gasbarro (principal), Alex Lacamoire
- Saxophones, woodwinds – Alex Hamlin, Dan Higgins, Don Markese, John Mitchell, John Yoakum, Neil Johnson, Sal Lozano, Steve Kujala
- Timpani – Don Williams
- Trombone – Alex Iles (principal), Alan Kaplan, Bill Reichenbach, Francisco Torres, Jennifer Wharton, Michael Davis
- Trumpet – David Washburn (principal), Wayne Bergeron (principal), Brian Pareschi, Dan Fornero, Jon Lewis, Marissa Benedict, Robert Schaer, Tony Kadleck
- Tuba – Doug Tornquist (principal), John Van Houten
- Viola – Darrin McCann (principal), Alma Fernandez, Andrew Duckles, Caroline Buckman, Cassandra Lynne Richburg*, Evan Wilson, Harry Shirinian, Jorge Moraga, Karen Elaine, Karie Prescott, Leah Katz, Luke Maurer, Maria Newman, Pamela Goldsmith, Scott Hosfeld
- Violin – Josefina Vergara (principal), Tereza Stanislav (principal), Aimée Kreston, Armen Anassian, Barbra Porter, Carolyn Osborn, Tina Chang Qu, Charlie Bisharat, Clayton Haslop, Darius Campo, Eun-Mee Ahn, Grace Oh, Jacqueline Brand, Jim Sitterly, Jessica Guideri, Joel Pargman, John Wittenberg, Kenneth Yerke, Kevin Kumar, Lorenz Gamma, Lucia Micarelli, Maia Jasper White, Marina Manukian, Mark Robertson, Neel Hammond, Nina Evtuhov, Peter Kent, Phillip Levy, Radu Pieptea, Roberto Cani, Roger Wilkie, Ron Clark, Sara Parkins, Sarah Thornblade, Serena McKinney, Shalini Vijayan, Songa Lee, Tamara Hatwan

Management

- Executive producer – Tom Macdougall
- Executive director – Andrew Page
- Package design – Steve Gerdes
- Music legal affairs – Catherine Baggett
- Music business affairs – Donna Cole-Brulé
- Music production manager – Ashley Chafin

== Chart performance ==
| Chart (2018) | Peak position |
|---|---|
| UK Soundtrack Albums (OCC) | 20 |

== Accolades ==
| Award | Date of ceremony | Category | Recipient(s) | Result | Ref. |
|---|---|---|---|---|---|
| Annie Awards | February 2, 2019 | Annie Award for Music in a Feature Production | Michael Giacchino | Won | |
| Hollywood Music in Media Awards | November 14, 2018 | Original Score – Animated Film | Michael Giacchino | Nominated | |
