= Inside Out (soundtrack) =

Inside Out: Original Soundtrack

Soundtrack album by Michael Giacchino
- Released: June 16, 2015
- Recorded: January–May 2015
- Studios: Eastwood Scoring Stage, Warner Bros., Los Angeles
- Length: 59:43
- Label: Walt Disney
- Producers: Michael Giacchino; Chris Montan

Michael Giacchino chronology
| Jurassic World (2015) | Inside Out (2015) | Zootopia (2016) |

Inside Out: Original Soundtrack is the soundtrack album to Disney/Pixar's 2015 film of the same name, composed and arranged by Michael Giacchino. It is the second collaboration between Michael Giacchino and Pete Docter, after previously working on Up, which it won an Academy Award for Best Original Score. Giacchino termed the score as "more emotional in comparison to the score for Up" and also being "more personal" due to his experience on parenthood. The score was recorded between January and May 2015, and featured more orchestral and symphonic music accompanied by a range of instruments, from piano, guitar, drum, organ and harp.

The score was digitally released by Walt Disney Records on June 16, 2015, and followed by a CD release on July 7. While the score album originally consisted of twenty-four tracks, an additional track, "Lava", from the Pixar short film of the same title, which accompanied with the film's theatrical release, was included in the soundtrack list. A 7-disc vinyl album was released in 2016, with cover artworks depicting the different characters in the film and their emotions. The soundtrack received positive critical acclaim, and earned Giacchino numerous awards and nominations, including an Annie Award for Outstanding Achievement in Music in a Feature Production, International Film Music Critics Association Award for Best Original Score for an Animated Film and World Soundtrack Award for Soundtrack Composer of the Year. It is regarded as one of Giacchino's best scores in his discography.

The Japanese theme song is "Itoshi no Riley" by Dreams Come True. The music video is sandwiched in between the Lava short and the actual film itself on the theatrical release.

== Development ==
Michael Giacchino was confirmed to score music for the film in late-May 2014. The producers first met with Giacchino to discuss the film's concept and screen it for him. In response, he composed an eight-minute suite of music, unconnected to the film, based on his emotions viewing it. Rivera remarked that as both Giacchino and Docter were musicians, and they discussed the film in terms of story and character. In accordance with its creative preference, a progressive soundscape was made by sound designer Ren Klyce, who was joined by Rivera. Audio mixing was done to harmonize "dense" sounds for the film's beginning scene. The introduction of Joy used a single sound.

The production of the score began in January 2015 and concluded that May, while simultaneously scoring for Disney's Tomorrowland and Jurassic World. While in the music session, Docter felt its score "bittersweet" and "nostalgic" after he "grew up playing the violin and bass". Giacchino wanted to create something more emotionally monumental for Inside Out's score, in comparison to his score from Up. In an interview to Screen Rant, Giacchino said "The simplest thing you can do is just be simple and it's always the hardest thing to do as well because the tendency is, for an emotional moment, is to pour on more and more and more but I learned over the years that it's actually the opposite [...] that's how I like the music to be there in those moments, it's almost as if a friend is there being with the character. So it may not end up being an incredibly melodic or soaring moment, but it doesn't need to be either." He called the score, as his most personal work following his experience of raising his daughter.

In a press release by Walt Disney Records, excerpts from Giacchino stated that "Pete [Docter] wanted the music to feel as if it was coming from the inside—from internal thoughts". He approached for an atmospheric score, rather than a traditional film score, as according to him, the goal of the music "to feel emotional" had mirrored the goal of the film. Giacchino said that "There's a 1930s jazzy section we wrote for the Forgetters, and we channel classic horror in the Subconscious. The film really goes all over the map musically, but what I love most about it is that we never forgot that it's an emotional story that's being told." The score was recorded using a 70-piece orchestra at the Eastwood Scoring Stage at Warner Bros., with an organ and rhythm sections, consisting of guitarists and drummers.

== Track listing ==
Inside Out: Original Soundtrack
| No. | Title | Length |
|---|---|---|
| 1. | "Bundle of Joy" | 2:50 |
| 2. | "Team Building" | 2:19 |
| 3. | "Nomanisone Island/National Movers" | 4:21 |
| 4. | "Overcoming Sadness" | 0:52 |
| 5. | "Free Skating" | 1:01 |
| 6. | "First Day of School" | 2:03 |
| 7. | "Riled Up" | 1:03 |
| 8. | "Goofball No Longer" | 1:11 |
| 9. | "Memory Lanes" | 1:23 |
| 10. | "The Forgetters" | 0:50 |
| 11. | "Chasing the Pink Elephant" | 1:55 |
| 12. | "Abstract Thought" | 1:47 |
| 13. | "Imagination Land" | 1:26 |
| 14. | "Down in the Dumps" | 1:47 |
| 15. | "Dream Productions" | 1:44 |
| 16. | "Dream a Little Nightmare" | 1:51 |
| 17. | "The Subconscious Basement" | 2:01 |
| 18. | "Escaping the Subconscious" | 2:09 |
| 19. | "We Can Still Stop Her" | 2:55 |
| 20. | "Tears of Joy" | 3:39 |
| 21. | "Rainbow Flyer" | 2:59 |
| 22. | "Chasing Down Sadness" | 1:46 |
| 23. | "Joy Turns to Sadness/A Growing Personality" | 7:49 |
| 24. | "The Joy of Credits (Note: includes the hidden track "TripleDent Gum Jingle" written by Andrea Datzman, Pete Docter and Bob Peterson, and performed by Nick Pitera and Andrea Datzman)" | 8:20 |
| Total length: | | 59:50 |

CD bonus track
| No. | Title | Writer(s) | Performer(s) | Length |
|---|---|---|---|---|
| 25. | "Lava (Note: from the Pixar short film Lava, released with Inside Out.)" | James Ford Murphy | Kuana Torres Kahele and Napua Makua | 5:47 |
| Total length: | | | | 65:36 |

== Chart performance ==
| Chart (2015) | Peak position |
|---|---|
| UK Soundtrack Albums (OCC) | 43 |
| US Billboard 200 | 35 |
| US Soundtrack Albums (Billboard) | 15 |

== Release history ==
| Date | Format(s) | Label | Ref. |
|---|---|---|---|
| June 16, 2015 | Digital download; streaming | Walt Disney Records | |
| July 7, 2015 | CD | Walt Disney Records | |
| January 28, 2016 | Vinyl | Mondo | |

== Awards and nominations ==
Accolades received by Inside Out (soundtrack)
| Award | Date of ceremony | Category | Recipient(s) | Result | Ref. |
|---|---|---|---|---|---|
| Annie Awards | February 6, 2016 | Outstanding Achievement in Music in a Feature Production | Michael Giacchino | Won | |
| Austin Film Critics Association Awards | December 29, 2015 | Best Score | Michael Giacchino | Nominated | |
| Chicago Film Critics Association Awards | December 16, 2015 | Best Original Score | Michael Giacchino | Nominated | |
| Hollywood Music in Media Awards | November 11, 2015 | Best Original Score in an Animated Film | Michael Giacchino | Nominated | |
| Houston Film Critics Society Awards | January 9, 2016 | Best Original Score | Michael Giacchino | Nominated | |
| International Film Music Critics Association Awards | February 18, 2016 | Best Original Score for an Animated Film | Michael Giacchino | Won | |
| Satellite Awards | February 21, 2016 | Best Original Score | Michael Giacchino | Nominated | |
| St. Louis Gateway Film Critics Association Awards | December 20, 2015 | Best Score | Michael Giacchino | Runner-up | |
| World Soundtrack Awards | October 24, 2015 | Film Composer of the Year | Michael Giacchino (Note: Also for Dawn of the Planet of the Apes (2014), Jupiter Ascending (2015), Jurassic World (2015), and Tomorrowland (2015)) | Won | |
