= Jurassic World Dominion (soundtrack) =

Jurassic World Dominion (Original Motion Picture Soundtrack)

Film score by Michael Giacchino
- Released: June 3, 2022
- Recorded: April–May 2021
- Studios: Abbey Road Studios, London
- Genre: Film score
- Length: 1:47:00
- Label: Back Lot Music
- Producer: Michael Giacchino

Michael Giacchino chronology
The Batman (2022)	Jurassic World Dominion (2022)	Lightyear (2022)

Jurassic World Dominion (Original Motion Picture Soundtrack) is the film score album to the 2022 film of the same name composed by Michael Giacchino. The sixth film in the Jurassic Park franchise, it is also the sequel to Jurassic World: Fallen Kingdom (2018) and the final film in the Jurassic World trilogy, while also serving as a conclusion to the storyline started in the original Jurassic Park trilogy. It is directed by Colin Trevorrow, who co-wrote the script with Emily Carmichael and story with Derek Connolly, and produced by Frank Marshall and Patrick Crowley, who also produced the predecessors, with Steven Spielberg, who directed Jurassic Park (1993), served as the executive producer.

Giacchino recorded the score within 10 days, at Abbey Road Studios in London during April–May 2021. The supervision of the track was remotely done through online due to COVID-19 pandemic lockdown. As with his previous Jurassic World scores, Giacchino incorporated John Williams' Jurassic Park theme into the score. The album was released digitally in Dolby Atmos by Back Lot Music on June 3, 2022. It was followed by a physical release on June 24, and a vinyl edition published by Mondo on August 12.

== Development ==
In March 2020, Michael Giacchino, who scored the previous Jurassic World films was announced as the composer for Jurassic World Dominion. Recording of the score took place at England's Abbey Road Studios over a 10-day period during late-April and early-May 2021. It was remotely done with a 100-member orchestra with director Colin Trevorrow supervising the music sessions online, due to the COVID-19 pandemic. Giacchino shared several behind-the-scenes pictures and videos from the recording session, to anticipate fans about the score. A set of musical themes, were created using MIDI so that "it does not feel the way the orchestra play it".

The score mixing was done in California. Similar to previous installments from the Jurassic World franchise, the Jurassic Park theme by John Williams is featured in the score. During the scoring sessions, Giacchino teased cue "2m19a: Alan For Granted" confirming the possibilities of a separate theme for Alan Grant who re-appears in Dominion. Despite being the lead role in the original Jurassic Park trilogy, Williams did not compose a principal theme or leitmotif for the character while Don Davis used the Jurassic Park theme to represent Grant's character in his score for Jurassic Park III. Following the character's return to the franchise in Dominion, Giacchino decided to compose a theme for the character. The track was named as "A Sattler Slate of Affairs/Alan for Granted/Sattler? I Barely Knew Her" (the eighth track in the film score). The score was conducted by Cliff Masterson, Ludwig Wicki and Alfonso Casado with orchestrations provided by Jeff Kryka, Curtis Green, Mick Giacchino and Jennifer Dirkes.

== Promotion and release ==
A two-and-a-half minute track "Da Plane and Da Cycle" (the 15th track in the album) was released exclusively on May 25, 2022. Collider.com reviewed that "Giacchino blends his usual lush orchestration with some unexpected electronic touches, making for an energetic introduction to his new score. And while it doesn't tip its hat to the iconic Jurassic Park theme, it does conclude on a familiar note." The score album featuring 32 tracks was released by Back Lot Music digitally on June 3, 2022, and physically released in digipak CDs on June 24. Unlike the digital album, the track list for the digipak CD release had 10 tracks excluded from the album, finalising 22 tracks being packaged for the physical formats.

In mid-June 2022, Mondo officially announced that, it would market the vinyl edition of the soundtrack (pressed on a 2-disc 180-gram color and black vinyl); several posters featuring the artwork from Mondo's creative team were exclusively made available on its website, and it is priced from $50 to $75. The vinyl soundtracks were released on August 12, 2022.

== Track listing ==
All music composed by Michael Giacchino.

Digital tracklist
No.	Title	Length
1.	"Jurassi-logos/Dinow This"	2:31
2.	"A Dinosaur in the Ranching Business"	3:08
3.	"It's Like Herding Parasaurolophus"	2:46
4.	"Upsy-Maisie"	1:42
5.	"Clonely You/The Hunters Become the Hunted"	2:37
6.	"The Campfire in Her Soul" (includes Jurassic Park theme by John Williams)	1:45
7.	"Hay of the Locusts"	1:11
8.	"A Sattler State of Affairs/Alan for Granted /Sattler? I Barely Know Her" (includes Jurassic Park theme by John Williams)	2:42
9.	"The Wages of Biosyn"	3:49
10.	"Free-Range Kidnapping"	4:32
11.	"A-Biosyn' We Will Go"	3:53
12.	"This Dodgson Burns Bright/The Maltese Dragons"	4:55
13.	"You're So Cute When You Smuggle"	4:27
14.	"In Contempt of Delacourt/Dance of the Atrociraptors"	5:24
15.	"Da Plane and Da Cycle"	2:35
16.	"You're Making Me Feel Wu-zy"	4:09
17.	"The Geneticist's Gambit/Cicadian Rhythms"	6:14
18.	"Therizinosaurus Will Be Blood/Land of the Frost"	4:02
19.	"A Dimetrodon a Dozen" (includes Jurassic Park theme by John Williams)	4:14
20.	"She Shoots, She Scorches"	3:12
21.	"Giganotosaurus On Your Life" (includes Jurassic Park theme by John Williams)	1:52
22.	"Ladder and Subtract/What's Your Major Malcolm Function/Six Degrees of Evacuation" (includes Jurassic Park theme by John Williams)	3:49
23.	"Ramsay's the Second No More"	2:48
24.	"Gotta Shut Down the Blah Blah Blah"	1:39
25.	"Girls Can Alpha Too"	1:26
26.	"Saliva and Kicking"	1:50
27.	"Wu-ing for Redemption"	3:35
28.	"Battle Royale with Reprise/Six Days Seven Denouements" (includes Jurassic Park theme by John Williams)	5:09
29.	"A-O-Kayla"	1:38
30.	"All the Jurassic World's a Rage"	2:43
31.	"Larry Curly and MOE" (includes Jurassic Park theme by John Williams)	2:06
32.	"Suite, Suite Dino Revenge" (includes Jurassic Park theme by John Williams)	8:59
Total length:		1:47:00

Physical tracklist
No.	Title	Length
1.	"Jurassi-logos/Dinow This"	2:31
2.	"It's Like Herding Parasaurolophus"	2:46
3.	"Upsy-Maisie"	1:42
4.	"Clonely You/The Hunters Become the Hunted"	2:37
5.	"The Campfire in Her Soul" (includes Jurassic Park theme by John Williams)	1:45
6.	"Hay of the Locusts"	1:11
7.	"A Sattler State of Affairs/Alan for Granted /Sattler? I Barely Know Her" (includes Jurassic Park theme by John Williams)	2:42
8.	"The Wages of Biosyn"	3:49
9.	"Free-Range Kidnapping"	4:32
10.	"A-Biosyn' We Will Go"	3:53
11.	"This Dodgson Burns Bright/The Maltese Dragons"	4:55
12.	"In Contempt of Delacourt/Dance of the Atrociraptors"	5:24
13.	"The Geneticist's Gambit/Cicadian Rhythms"	6:14
14.	"A Dimetrodon a Dozen" (includes Jurassic Park theme by John Williams)	4:14
15.	"She Shoots, She Scorches"	3:12
16.	"Giganotosaurus On Your Life" (includes Jurassic Park theme by John Williams)	1:52
17.	"Ladder and Subtract/What's Your Major Malcolm Function/Six Degrees of Evacuation" (includes Jurassic Park theme by John Williams)	2:48
18.	"Gotta Shut Down the Blah Blah Blah"	3:49
19.	"Wu-ing for Redemption"	1:46
20.	"Battle Royale with Reprise/Six Days Seven Denouements" (includes Jurassic Park theme by John Williams)	5:09
21.	"All the Jurassic World's a Rage" (includes Jurassic Park theme by John Williams)	2:43
22.	"Suite, Suite Dino Revenge" (includes Jurassic Park theme by John Williams)	8:59
Total length:		1:17:00

== Reception ==
Giacchino's score received mixed to positive response from critics. Classic FM wrote "The bombastic nature of the music is what we've come to expect from Giacchino, and the underlying fantastical nature of the score easily transports the listener into this alternative world where dinosaurs run free." Zanobard Reviews gave 8/10 to the score saying "Michael Giacchino's score for Jurassic World Dominion closes the musical book on the iconic dinosaur franchise in the best way possible really, bringing pretty much all of the established Giacchino and most of Williams' thematic material together with now even more new themes, resulting in an expansive orchestral tapestry that manages to stay entertaining pretty much throughout its entire two hour runtime, which is no easy feat." James Southall of Movie Wave wrote "Giacchino clearly thrives on working on big franchises and it's so good that he's had the chance to see this sequel trilogy through. He also clearly loves writing this kind of monster music and this score features an absolute load of that. While the released lengthy album doesn't really do the score justice, there's no doubt how good it is at its peak and you don't really need to cut all that much out to enjoy it to its fullest potential."

Music critic Jonathan Broxton wrote: "The score for Jurassic World: Dominion is long, more than an hour and 40 minutes, but it's one of those rare long scores that never runs out of steam or feels padded with filler. The narrative development of the score is such that no moments ever feel wasted or superfluous; the progression of the themes in a dramatic sense is excellent, especially the way the Biosyn theme gradually leaves its 'ooh-aah' initial feeling as the protagonists fly over the mountains, and becomes more sinister as Dodgson's plans are revealed; conversely, the way the Fallen Kingdom theme gradually becomes redemptive for Dr Wu feels like vindication for the man whose genetic experiments caused all this mayhem in the first place, but who eventually turns to to[sic] be the man who will save the world." Filmtracks.com wrote "So much of Jurassic World: Dominion is generically rhythmic, even its heightened action material, that it really doesn't fit comfortably with its sibling scores. Suspense passages are often mundane and do too little to smartly exercise melodic constructs in conflict. The shift to electronic snazziness for chasing scenes is not a deal-breaker, but it seems beneath this franchise."

Gisanne Sophia of Marvelous Geeks Media wrote "The Jurassic World Dominion original score is effortlessly transportive to keep in the background, and whether you've ever watched one of the films or not, you could (and should) still listen to the score. Where the film dives into nostalgic elements while propelling audiences to look towards the present, the music beautifully touches on the heart of the film. And while this is done throughout the entirety of the album, how the final song acts as a culmination of new and old is utterly masterful and goosebumps evoking. These very tracks could transport listeners towards places they might not have otherwise ventured to, and that's where a majority of its charm lies." Scott Mendelson of Forbes called Giacchino's score as "haunting, especially during this brief digression". Mark Kermode of The Guardian said "As for composer Michael Giacchino, he seems to have the mundane measure of it all, trowelling on the "piano-says-sad/strings-say-exciting" motifs in solidly indifferent workaday fashion" and Matt Zoller Seitz of RogerEbert.com opined that Giacchino's score "pours on sinister Arabic-African "exotic" cliches".

== Chart performance ==
Chart performance for Jurassic World Dominion (Original Motion Picture Soundtrack)
Chart (2022)	Peak position
UK Soundtrack Albums (OCC)	42

== Release history ==
Release dates and formats for Jurassic World Dominion (Original Motion Picture Soundtrack)
Region	Date	Format(s)	Label	Ref.
Various	June 3, 2022	Digital download; streaming	Back Lot Music	
Various	June 24, 2022	CD	Back Lot Music	
Various	August 12, 2022	Vinyl	Mondo	
