= Try Everything =

Single by Shakira

from the album Zootopia: Original Motion Picture Soundtrack
- Released: January 26, 2016
- Recorded: 2013–2015
- Studio: Westlake Recording Studios
- Genre: Pop
- Length: 3:22
- Label: Walt Disney
- Songwriters: Sia Furler; Tor Hermansen; Mikkel Eriksen
- Producer: Stargate

Shakira singles chronology
| "Mi Verdad" (2015) | "Try Everything" (2016) | "La Bicicleta" (2016) |

Music video
- "Try Everything" on YouTube

"Try Everything" is a song recorded by Colombian singer Shakira for the 2016 Walt Disney Animation Studios film Zootopia. It was released as a single on 26 January 2016 through Walt Disney Records. The song was nominated at the 59th Annual Grammy Awards for Best Song Written for Visual Media.

Commercially, the track has featured in numerous international charts, reaching number one in Lebanon and Japan, being certified platinum by BPI and four-time platinum certification by RIAA. (Note: See #Charts)

== Background and composition ==
The song was written by Australian singer Sia alongside Norwegian production duo Stargate. The song was first recorded in 2013 by American girl group Fifth Harmony for their debut extended play Better Together, before being scrapped.

In the film, it is featured as a song recorded by a singer named Gazelle, voiced by Shakira in the film.

== Commercial performance ==
The song peaked at number 63 on the Billboard Hot 100, as well as number 26 on the Digital Songs chart with the help of 33,000 digital downloads and three million US streams after the release of its official music video. The song was certified 3 times platinum in the United States by RIAA for sales exceeding 3,000,000 units. It also received a platinum certification in the United Kingdom by BPI for sales of over 600,000 units.

== Critical reception ==
The song was nominated for Best Song Written For Visual Media at the 59th Grammy Awards. In 2020 Billboard named "Try Everything" as one of the 12 best Disney songs of the 21st century. In 2022, the song ranked 19th on the Billboard Greatest of All Time Disney Songs chart. In the UK, the song ranked 25th on the list of Disney's Official most-streamed songs as of 2022.

== Music video ==
The music video consists mostly of scenes from Zootopia, intercut with footage of Shakira singing in a recording studio.

== Accolades ==
| Year | Award | Category | Result | Ref |
|---|---|---|---|---|
| 2016 | Teen Choice Awards 2016 | Choice Song from a Movie or TV Show | Nominated | |
| 2017 | Grammy Awards | Best Song Written For Visual Media | Nominated | |
| 2017 | Hollywood Music in Media Awards 2016 | Best Song – Animated Film | Nominated | |

== International version ==
As the track is a background song, not key for the understanding of the plot, "Try Everything" was left untranslated in most foreign dubbings. However, it numbers a few adaptations around the world.

All official versions of "Try Everything"
| Language | Performer | Title | Translation |
|---|---|---|---|
| Chinese Mandarin | Sophie Chen | "尝试一切" (Chángshì yīqiè) | "Try everything" |
| English | Shakira | "Try everything" | |
| Hindi | Shruti Rane | "हार ना मानूँगी" (Haar na Manungi) | "I won't give up" |
| Japanese | Ami Nakashima | "トライ・エヴリシング" (Torai evurishingu) | "Try everything" |
| Korean | Kim Kyung-Sun | "최선을 다해" (Choiseon-eul dahae) | "Do your best" |
| Polish | Paulina Przybysz | "Nie bój się chcieć" | "Don't be afraid of wishing" |
| Ukrainian | Zlata Ognevich | "Не відступлю" (Ne vidstuplyu) | "I won't give up" |

== Other versions ==
In April 2016, the five man a cappella group Home Free released a music video of their cover of the song. As of November 2021, the video had over 8.5 million views on YouTube.

In November 2020, the South Korean girl group Purple Kiss covered the song as part of their international medley of covers of the top female vocalist from each country.

In 2024, Emily Ann Roberts covered the song as the voice of Trixie for the reimagined Country Bear Musical Jamboree attraction at Walt Disney World's Magic Kingdom.

== Charts ==
| Chart (2016–2017) | Peak position |
|---|---|
| Australia (ARIA) | 57 |
| Austria (Ö3 Austria Top 40) | 39 |
| Belgium (Ultratip Bubbling Under Wallonia) | 9 |
| Canada Hot 100 (Billboard) | 49 |
| France (SNEP) | 43 |
| Germany (GfK) | 54 |
| Hungary (Single Top 40) | 6 |
| Japan Hot 100 (Billboard) | 41 |
| Japan Overseas (Billboard) | 1 |
| Lebanon (The Official Lebanese Top 20) | 1 |
| South Korea (Circle) | 7 |
| South Korea International (Gaon) | 7 |
| Slovakia Airplay (ČNS IFPI) | 10 |
| Slovakia Singles Digital (ČNS IFPI) | 50 |
| Slovenia (SloTop50) | 39 |
| Spain (Promusicae) | 32 |
| Switzerland (Schweizer Hitparade) | 39 |
| UK Singles Chart (OCC) | 186 |
| US Billboard Hot 100 | 63 |

=== Year-end charts ===
| Chart (2016) | Position |
|---|---|
| Hungary (Single Top 40) | 86 |
| South Korea International Gaon | 51 |
| South Korea (Circle) | 58 |

== Sales and certifications ==
| Region | Certification | Certified units/sales |
|---|---|---|
| Brazil (Pro-Música Brasil) | Gold | 30,000^{‡} |
| Denmark (IFPI Danmark) | Gold | 45,000^{‡} |
| France (SNEP) | Gold | 100,000^{‡} |
| New Zealand (RMNZ) | Platinum | 30,000^{‡} |
| South Korea (Gaon Chart) | — | 170,972 |
| United Kingdom (BPI) | Platinum | 600,000^{‡} |
| United States (RIAA) | 4× Platinum | 4,000,000^{‡} |
^{‡} Sales+streaming figures based on certification alone.

== Release history ==
List of release dates, showing region, formats, label and reference
| Region | Date | Format(s) | Label | Ref. |
|---|---|---|---|---|
| United States | January 8, 2016 | Digital audio | Walt Disney | |
| United States | January 26, 2016 | Contemporary hit radio | Walt Disney | |
