= Zootopia (soundtrack) =

2016 film score by Michael Giacchino

Zootopia (Original Motion Picture Soundtrack)

Film score by Michael Giacchino
- Released: March 4, 2016 (Digital); March 25, 2016 (CD)
- Recorded: 2015
- Studios: Eastwood Scoring Stage, Warner Bros., Los Angeles
- Genre: Film score
- Length: 62:34
- Label: Walt Disney
- Producers: Michael Giacchino; Chris Montan

Michael Giacchino chronology
| Inside Out (2015) | Zootopia (2016) | Star Trek Beyond (2016) |

Singles from Zootopia
- 1. "Try Everything" Released: February 23, 2016

Zootopia (Original Motion Picture Soundtrack) is the soundtrack album to the 2016 animated film Zootopia produced by Walt Disney Animation Studios. The film's score is composed by Michael Giacchino, marking his first feature-length project for Walt Disney Animation Studios, after composing for specials and short films produced by the studio, as well as multiple Pixar films. (Note: Giacchino worked on the Goofy short How to Hook Up Your Home Theater, the two Prep & Landing specials and the short film The Ballad of Nessie, all produced by Walt Disney Animation Studios) In addition to the original score, the film features a song titled "Try Everything" performed by Shakira, apart from providing voice-over to the character Gazelle, with the song written by Sia and Stargate. The soundtrack was released digitally and through CD on March 4 and 25, 2016 by Walt Disney Records. A double-LP picture disc titled Music From Zootopia was released on May 19, 2017.

== Composition ==
Giacchino started recording for the film's score on November 16, 2015. He called the film as "one of those films with a huge heart and wonderfully realized characters set within a story that’s not only incredibly fun and entertaining but takes an honest look at our own world and the important issues we deal with living in such a diverse society. That’s what really attracted me to the film, the chance to write music that reflects these kind of challenges." While adding that the score had "flavors of world music sprinkled everywhere", it always follow the emotional story of Hopps and Nick. With executive music producer Chris Montan and music supervisor Tom McDougall, the recording sessions began with an 80-piece orchestra conducted by Tim Simonec and was completed within 4 days.

The score consisted entirely of percussion instruments, such as onglong, gamelan, African drums, South American drums, bells and special instruments imported from Indonesia. All these were arranged and played by prominent percussionist Emil Richards, known for his collaborations with Jerry Goldsmith on the Planet of the Apes score. Emil offered Giacchino, a mixing bowl and a ram horns, which he blended and used in the score, calling it as a "perfect combination of sounds and weirdness that we can throw in there". Giacchino further created an 8-minute suite, driven through piano, making it devoid from the comedic elements and focuses in a more emotional way.

== Track listing ==
All music is composed by Michael Giacchino, except where noted.

Zootopia soundtrack
| No. | Title | Writer(s) | Performer | Length |
|---|---|---|---|---|
| 1. | "Try Everything" | Sia Furler; Tor Hermansen; Mikkel Eriksen | Shakira | 3:16 |
| 2. | "Stage Fright" | | | 0:39 |
| 3. | "Grey's Uh-Mad at Me" | | | 1:44 |
| 4. | "Ticket to Write" | | | 1:07 |
| 5. | "Foxy Fakeout" | | | 2:08 |
| 6. | "Jumbo Pop Hustle" | | | 1:50 |
| 7. | "Walk and Stalk" | | | 1:29 |
| 8. | "Not a Real Cop" | | | 1:34 |
| 9. | "Hopps Goes (After) the Weasel" | | | 2:19 |
| 10. | "The Naturalist" | | | 3:09 |
| 11. | "Work Slowly and Carry a Big Shtick" | | | 0:44 |
| 12. | "Mr. Big" | | | 2:47 |
| 13. | "Case of the Manchas" | | | 4:00 |
| 14. | "The Nick of Time" | | | 5:02 |
| 15. | "World's Worst Animal Shelter" | | | 4:24 |
| 16. | "Some of My Best Friends Are Predators" | | | 3:47 |
| 17. | "A Bunny Can Go Savage" | | | 1:45 |
| 18. | "Weasel Shakedown" | | | 2:04 |
| 19. | "Ramifications" | | | 3:58 |
| 20. | "Ewe Fell for It" | | | 6:37 |
| 21. | "Three-Toe Bandito" | | | 0:43 |
| 22. | "Suite from Zootopia" | | | 7:28 |
| Total length: | | | | 62:34 |

== Personnel credits ==
Credits and personnel for the soundtrack adapted from AllMusic.

- Mike Anderson – engineer
- Amund Björklund – arranger
- Connie Boylan – assistant contractor
- Ashley Chafin – management, music production
- Vincent Cirilli – engineer
- Dave Clauss – engineer
- David Coker – scoring assistant
- Donna Cole-Brulé – management, music business affairs
- Mae Crosby – synthesizer programming
- Andrea Datzman – music editor, score
- Brad Dechter – orchestration
- Greg Dennen – scoring crew
- Luke Dennis – technician
- Mikkel Eriksen – engineer, text
- Patricia Sullivan – mastering
- Sia Furler – text
- Earl Ghaffari – music editor, producer
- Michael Giacchino – composer, arranger, score producer
- Tom Hardisty – engineer
- Greg Hayes – scoring crew
- Jill Heffley – executive assistant
- Tor Erik Hermansen – text
- Joel Iwataki – engineer, mixing
- Jeff Kryka – orchestration
- Espen Lind – arranger
- Tom MacDougall – music supervisor
- Chris Montan – executive producer
- Jamie Olvera – scoring crew
- Andrew Page – music production, executive director
- Cameron Patrick – orchestration
- Daniela Rivera – assistant engineer
- Ryan Robinson – scoring crew
- Shakira – primary artist
- Tim Simonec – conductor, score orchestration
- Alki Steriopoulos – orchestration
- Phil Tan – mixing
- Brian Taylor – synthesizer programming
- Jimmy Tsai – production assistant
- Miles Walker – engineer
- Eric Wegener – synthesizer programming
- Richard Wheeler Jr. – scoring crew
- Booker White – music preparation, copyist
- Reggie Wilson – contractor

== Charts ==
Chart performance for Zootopia (Original Motion Picture Soundtrack)
| Chart (2026) | Peak position |
|---|---|
| Japanese Hot Albums (Billboard Japan) | 54 |

== Accolades ==
| Award | Date of ceremony | Category | Recipient(s) | Result | Ref. |
|---|---|---|---|---|---|
| Grammy Awards | February 12, 2017 | Best Song Written for Visual Media | Sia and Stargate for "Try Everything" | Nominated | |
| Hollywood Music in Media Awards | November 17, 2016 | Best Original Score – Animated Film | Michael Giacchino | Nominated | |
| Hollywood Music in Media Awards | November 17, 2016 | Best Song – Animated Film | Sia and Stargate for "Try Everything" | Nominated | |
| International Film Music Critics Association | February 23, 2017 | Best Original Score For An Animated Film | Michael Giacchino | Nominated | |
| Teen Choice Awards | July 31, 2016 | Choice Music: Song from a Movie or TV Show | Shakira for "Try Everything" | Nominated | |
