= The Batman (soundtrack) =

2022 soundtrack album by Michael Giacchino

The Batman (Original Motion Picture Soundtrack)

Film score by Michael Giacchino
- Released: February 25, 2022
- Recorded: October 2021
- Studios: Abbey Road Studios, London
- Genre: Film score
- Length: 115:59
- Label: WaterTower
- Producer: Michael Giacchino

Michael Giacchino chronology
Spider-Man: No Way Home (2021)	The Batman (2022)	Jurassic World Dominion (2022)

Singles from The Batman
- 1. "The Batman" Released: January 21, 2022; 2. "The Riddler" Released: February 4, 2022; 3. "Catwoman" Released: February 17, 2022

The Batman (Original Motion Picture Soundtrack) is the film score to the film of the same name composed by Michael Giacchino. The soundtrack was released by WaterTower Music on February 25, 2022, a week ahead of the release of the film.

== Background ==
Director Matt Reeves announced that Michael Giacchino would be composing the score for The Batman in October 2019. Giacchino has frequently collaborated with Reeves; he previously scored for Cloverfield (2008), Let Me In (2010), Dawn of the Planet of the Apes (2014), and War for the Planet of the Apes (2017). Later that month, Giacchino said he had already finished writing the main theme for the film because he was so excited to do so; because this music was written much earlier in the production than is usual for a film, Giacchino and Reeves were able to use it in promotional materials. Giacchino said he felt total freedom to write the music that he wanted for the film, agreeing with Reeves that this was their vision of Batman similar to how different comic book and graphic novel authors and artists over the years had been able to create different takes on the character.

Giacchino recorded the score at Abbey Road Studios in London, and completed it in October 2021. Giacchino's main theme was released as a single on January 21, 2022, followed by his theme for the Riddler which was released as a single on February 4, and his Catwoman theme was released as the third and final single on February 17. WaterTower Music's YouTube upload of the main theme garnered 2.3 million views, which became the label's highest streaming engagement for pre-release from a score album. The full soundtrack album was released on February 25.

== Track listing ==
All music is composed by Michael Giacchino. "Sonata in Darkness" was performed by Gloria Cheng.

No.	Title	Length
1.	"Can't Fight City Halloween"	4:04
2.	"Mayoral Ducting"	2:34
3.	"It's Raining Vengeance"	4:31
4.	"Don't Be Voyeur with Me"	2:38
5.	"Crossing the Feline"	1:46
6.	"Gannika Girl"	2:30
7.	"Moving In for the Gil"	4:23
8.	"Funeral and Far Between"	1:45
9.	"Collar ID"	1:15
10.	"Escaped Crusader"	2:44
11.	"Penguin of Guilt"	3:44
12.	"Highway to the Anger Zone"	5:19
13.	"World's Worst Translator"	3:34
14.	"Riddles, Riddles Everywhere"	1:54
15.	"Meow and You and Everyone We Know"	5:18
16.	"For All Your Pennyworth"	2:38
17.	"Are You a Kenzie or a Can't-zie?"	5:45
18.	"An Im-purr-fect Murder"	3:48
19.	"The Great Pumpkin Pie"	2:22
20.	"Hoarding School"	4:55
21.	"A Flood of Terrors"	4:29
22.	"A Bat in the Rafters, Pt. 1"	4:33
23.	"A Bat in the Rafters, Pt. 2"	6:42
24.	"The Bat's True Calling"	3:05
25.	"All's Well That Ends Farewell"	2:41
26.	"The Batman"	6:47
27.	"Catwoman"	3:03
28.	"The Riddler"	5:01
29.	"Sonata in Darkness"	12:11
Total length:		115:59

== Additional music ==
"Something in the Way" by Nirvana, which was used in the promotional material, is featured twice toward the beginning and ending of the film. "Ave Maria" by Franz Schubert, "Piano Concerto No. 5; II. Adagio un poco mosso" by Ludwig van Beethoven, "Frisk" by Patrick Topping and Kevin Saunderson, "Tesla" by Corvad, "Hot 44" by Baauer, "Troop" and "Darkroom" by Peggy Gou, "Dido's Lament" by Henry Purcell, "Requiem" by Gabriel Fauré, "I Have But One Heart" by Al Martino, and "Volare" by Dean Martin are also featured in the film. "Ave Maria" is featured four times in the film, and was performed by the Tiffin Boys' Choir, who also performed "Dido's Lament". Paul Dano, who portrays the Riddler in the film, also later performs the song during Batman's interrogation with the Riddler. Swedish DJ and producer Alesso also produced a track for the film titled "Dark".

== Reception ==
Professional ratings
Review scores
Source	Rating
AllMusic	4/5 stars
Filmtracks	2/5 stars
Movie Wave	5/5 stars

The soundtrack has received positive reception from critics and general audiences alike. Jon Burlingame of Variety referred to the score as "the symphonic equivalent of Reeves’ film, suggesting the haunted figure behind the mask amid the grim maelstrom of Gotham crime." Marcy Donelson of AllMusic gave the soundtrack a 4/5, calling it "dark, lurking, and often eerily sparse" as a result of its rock and orchestral instrumentation. Valerie Ettenhofer of /Film praised the score, saying "it's been a long time since a superhero movie score felt this epic."

=== Accolades ===
Award	Date	Category	Result	Ref.
Austin Film Critics Association Awards	January 10, 2023	Best Score	Nominated	
Chicago Film Critics Association Awards	December 14, 2022	Best Original Score	Nominated	
Critics' Choice Movie Awards	January 15, 2023	Best Score	Nominated	
Georgia Film Critics Association Awards	January 13, 2023	Best Original Score	Won	
Grammy Awards	February 5, 2023	Best Score Soundtrack for Visual Media	Nominated	
Hollywood Critics Association Creative Arts Awards	February 24, 2023	Best Score	Nominated	
Hollywood Music in Media Awards	November 16, 2022	Best Original Score in a Sci-Fi/Fantasy Film	Nominated	
Online Film Critics Society Awards	January 23, 2023	Best Original Score	Nominated	
Saturn Awards	October 25, 2022	Best Film Music	Nominated	
Society of Composers & Lyricists	February 15, 2023	Outstanding Original Score for a Studio Film	Nominated	
St. Louis Film Critics Association Awards	December 18, 2022	Best Score	Runner-up	
Washington D.C. Area Film Critics Association Awards	December 12, 2022	Best Original Score	Won	

== Charts ==
Chart performance for The Batman
Chart (2022)	Peak position
Japanese Hot Albums (Billboard Japan)	96
Swiss Albums (Schweizer Hitparade)	92
US Billboard 200	183
US Soundtrack Albums (Billboard)	5
