= Bad Times at the El Royale (soundtrack) =

2018 soundtrack albums

Bad Times at the El Royale (Original Motion Picture Soundtrack)

Soundtrack album by various artists
- Released: October 12, 2018
- Genre: Pop; rock; soul
- Length: 31:08 (initial); 36:58 (re-release)
- Label: Republic; Fox Music
- Producer: Harvey Mason Jr.

Bad Times at the El Royale (Original Motion Picture Score)

Film score by Michael Giacchino
- Released: October 12, 2018
- Length: 74:45
- Label: Milan; Fox Music
- Producer: Michael Giacchino

Michael Giacchino chronology
Jurassic World: Fallen Kingdom (2018)	Bad Times at the El Royale (2018)	Spider-Man: Far From Home (2019)

Bad Times at the El Royale is a 2018 neo-noir thriller film written, directed, and produced by Drew Goddard, featuring an ensemble cast consisting of Jeff Bridges, Cynthia Erivo, Dakota Johnson, Jon Hamm, Cailee Spaeny, Lewis Pullman, and Chris Hemsworth. Two soundtrack albums were released for the film — a compilation album, featuring popular songs incorporated in the film's screenplay with the supervision of Goddard and produced by Harvey Mason Jr. was titled Bad Times at the El Royale (Original Motion Picture Soundtrack), and an album consisting of original score composed and produced by Michael Giacchino titled Bad Times at the El Royale (Original Motion Picture Score). Both the score and soundtrack album, were released by Republic Records and Milan Records on October 12, 2018, coinciding with the film's theatrical release. A digital re-release of the film's soundtrack, featuring two additional songs, were released on November 23, which was positively received.

== Background ==
Goddard wrote each song into his screenplay before pitching it for an "organic process of structuring the film and the songs" and told major studios to avoid buying the script if they could not buy the licenses for each piece of music. He described the film as "a love letter to music" and served as a music supervisor. Goddard had Erivo sing her songs live on set with the belief that without it, "the movie would not work". With Entertainment Weekly, Goddard said that the music was "almost like the eighth character in the movie. It serves the function of a chorus in a Shakespearean play. It actually is a key part of the emotional fabric of the film." As a result, the production crew had each song playing during filming on loudspeakers; Pullman and Bridges said they had originally read the script while listening to the songs in the background as a "great way to set the tone". In introducing the character of cult leader Billy Lee with "Twelve Thirty", Goddard said he wanted to provide a metaphorical connection with the character, as the song is "very bright and seductive, but when you really listen to what the words are saying, there's an incredible darkness".

Although not included on the soundtrack, Erivo also performed the songs "Try A Little Tenderness", "What Becomes of the Broken Hearted", "You Can't Hurry Love", and "Unchained Melody". Director Goddard also self-penned a song for Erivo to perform, titled "Hold Me In Your Arms, Lift Me On High". Erivo was required to sing on camera in real-time, with no option to use pre-recorded vocals: "Every time you see me sing in a room, wherever, it's happening in that room and I'm singing for real", Erivo explained later. For the long scene where Laramie discovers the secret passageway, retakes and resets for different camera angles required Erivo to perform twenty-seven times, while the later scene where Darlene is singing to cover the noise Doc makes while digging was shot twenty times.

The film score was composed by Michael Giacchino, who had met Goddard while working on television series Alias and Lost. After his inclusion being confirmed on mid-June 2018, Giacchino recorded the score during August 15–16, 2018, at the Newman Scoring Stage at 20th Century Fox Studios.

== Reception ==
The soundtrack opened to positive reviews from critics, with Polygon's Karen Han called it "one of the year's best". Angelica Florio from Bustle said that "between the music playing from the soundtrack throughout the movie and Darlene's show-stopping performances, you definitely get the sense that the song selection was key for Goddard". Reviewing for the film's original score, Movie Wave's James Southall wrote "all of the remaining 67 minutes of album is rendered somewhat superfluous to requirements: virtually everything else of note on the album is a variant of something heard in that opening piece but rarely rendered in such a satisfying form (and there are some rather dull suspense cues making up the balance of the run time). It is interesting to hear the composer [Giacchino] do something this gritty – he uses a dark orchestration style favouring the lower ranges almost exclusively with the flavour coming from some interesting textures [...] worth emphasising that the opening and closing tracks really are terrific and run 18 minutes between them – and there's enough in between them to make this easy to recommend to Giacchino enthusiasts – it's just not quite what it could be."

== Bad Times at the El Royale (Original Motion Picture Soundtrack) ==
=== Track listing ===
Initial release
No.	Title	Writer(s)	Performer(s)	Length
1.	"26 Miles (Santa Catalina)"	Bruce Belland; Glen A. Larson	The Four Preps	2:28
2.	"Twenty-Five Miles"	Bert Berns; Johnny Bristol; Harvey Fuqua; Edwin Starr; Jerry Wexler	Edwin Starr	3:21
3.	"Bend Me, Shape Me"	Scott English; Larry Weiss	The American Breed	2:13
4.	"He's a Rebel"	Gene Pitney	Alana Da Fonseca	2:53
5.	"I Got a Feeling"	Holland–Dozier–Holland	Four Tops	3:04
6.	"Can't Take My Eyes Off You"	Bob Crewe; Bob Gaudio	Frankie Valli	3:22
7.	"Bernadette"	Holland–Dozier–Holland	Four Tops	3:03
8.	"He's Sure the Boy I Love"	Barry Mann; Cynthia Weil	The Crystals	2:45
9.	"The Letter"	Wayne Carson	The Box Tops	1:54
10.	"Twelve Thirty (Young Girls Are Coming to the Canyon)"	John Phillips	The Mamas & the Papas	3:26
11.	"Baby, I Love You"	Jeff Barry; Ellie Greenwich; Phil Spector	Tommy Roe	2:39
Total length:				31:08

Re-release
No.	Title	Writer(s)	Performer(s)	Length
12.	"This Old Heart of Mine (Is Weak for You)"	Holland–Dozier–Holland	Cynthia Erivo	3:03
13.	"Hold On, I'm Comin'"	Isaac Hayes; David Porter	Cynthia Erivo	2:47
Total length:				36:58

=== Charts ===
Chart (2018)	Peak position
UK Compilation Albums (OCC)	74
UK Soundtrack Albums (OCC)	30
US Billboard 200	107
US Soundtrack Albums (Billboard)	19

== Bad Times at the El Royale (Original Motion Picture Score) ==
=== Track listing ===
No.	Title	Length
1.	"The Suite at the El Royale"	7:52
2.	"A Room with an Entrez-Vous"	0:55
3.	"Let the Spieling Begin"	1:54
4.	"Rough Around the Ledger"	3:04
5.	"It's Ms. You to You"	1:40
6.	"Mirror Mortals"	2:36
7.	"When Push Comes to Hoover"	1:46
8.	"Darlene-Eyed Monster"	0:53
9.	"My Memory, My Memory"	1:41
10.	"I Spy with My Little FBI"	2:06
11.	"Sea You Again Soon"	1:38
12.	"The Doors of Deception"	2:38
13.	"Voyeur in so Much Trouble"	6:05
14.	"Clingin' in the Rain"	6:54
15.	"A Bang up Robbery"	3:08
16.	"You Can't Flynn 'em All"	1:09
17.	"Rose and Cons"	2:39
18.	"A Blaze of Allegory"	4:41
19.	"Billy Lee Is Not My Lover"	3:12
20.	"Roulette the Chips Fall"	6:53
21.	"The Wages of Flynn"	1:15
22.	"Absolution Presents Itself"	10:06
Total length:		74:45
