= Coco (soundtrack) =

2017 soundtrack album by various artists

Coco (Original Motion Picture Soundtrack)

Soundtrack album by Various Artists
- Released: November 19, 2017
- Recorded: August–October 2017
- Studios: Eastwood Scoring Stage (score); Avatar (New York, New York); Henson (Hollywood, California); Estudio 13; Audio by the Bay; Crawford Media Services
- Genres: Son mexicano; Mariachi; Son jarocho; Ranchera; Huapango; Bolero; Mexican pop
- Length: 79:09
- Languages: English; Spanish
- Label: Walt Disney
- Producers: Michael Giacchino; Tom MacDougall; Germaine Franco; Kristen Anderson-Lopez; Robert Lopez

Michael Giacchino chronology
War for the Planet of the Apes (2017)	Coco (2017)	Incredibles 2 (2018)

Germaine Franco chronology
Shovel Buddies (2016)	Coco (2017)	Tag (2018 film) (2018)

Coco (Original Motion Picture Soundtrack) is the soundtrack album to the Disney/Pixar's 2017 film of the same name. Released by Walt Disney Records on November 19, 2017, the album features eight original songs written by Germaine Franco, Adrian Molina, Robert Lopez and Kristen Anderson-Lopez, four alternate versions and 26 score pieces composed by Michael Giacchino.

The score was released in 17 languages: English, Spanish, Portuguese, French, Italian, German, Dutch, Flemish, Polish, Swedish, Finnish, Norwegian, Russian, Kazakh, Japanese, Mandarin Chinese, and Korean.

Exclusive versions of "Remember Me" by another singer in other languages were included in certain releases: Spanish (Carlos Rivera), French (Sébastien Chato, in Spanish), Italian (Michele Bravi, in Italian and Spanish), Japanese (Hiiro Ishibashi, voice of Miguel), Chinese (Mao Bu Yi) and Korean (Yoon Jong-shin). The Swedish, Finnish, and Norwegian versions share an electronic remix of Miguel and Natalia Lafourcade's cover, and the Japanese version also has a ska remix by Kavka Shishido and the Tokyo Ska Paradise Orchestra in both Japanese and Spanish.

== Background ==
On July 14, 2017, at the Disney D23 expo, Michael Giacchino had confirmed that he will be scoring the music for Coco. Later, Robert Lopez, and Kristen Anderson-Lopez also confirmed that they will be writing few original songs, while Germaine Franco and co-director Adrian Molina, also joined the team. Recording for the score began on August 14, 2017. "Franco orchestrated the score and wrote additional music, and she made numerous trips to Mexico to record local musicians. She also ended up contributing several original songs, including the joyous number "Un Poco Loco" and the heartfelt closer, "Proud Corazón."

Originally, the film was meant to be a "break-into-song" musical. Lopez and Anderson-Lopez had written many more songs for the film than what ended up in the released version; one piece that survived in storyboard until late into the production was an expository song that explained the Mexican holiday to viewers to begin the film. In another song, Miguel's mother explains the tradition of shoe-making in their family, and how this means he is not allowed to pursue music. Plans for the film to be a full musical film were scrapped following early test screenings.

Following the 90th Academy Awards ceremony, where "Remember Me" won the award for Best Original Song, the album broke the top 40 on the Billboard 200 charts, jumping from 120 to 39, where it peaked before dropping to 64. In the week of March 8, the Miguel version of "Remember Me" gained 1.58 million plays via online streaming, according to the Nielsen Music.

== Track listing ==
All music is composed by Michael Giacchino, except where noted.

No.	Title	Writer(s)	Performer(s)	Length
1.	"Remember Me"	Kristen Anderson-Lopez & Robert Lopez	Benjamin Bratt	1:49
2.	"Much Needed Advice"	Germaine Franco, Michael Giacchino, & Adrian Molina	Bratt & Antonio Sol	1:45
3.	"Everyone Knows Juanita"	Germaine Franco & Molina	Gael García Bernal	1:15
4.	"Un Poco Loco"	Germaine Franco & Molina	García Bernal & Anthony Gonzalez	1:52
5.	"Jálale (Instrumental)"	Holger Beier, Pat Beier, & Camilo Lara	Mexican Institute of Sound	2:54
6.	"The World Es Mi Familia"	Germaine Franco & Molina	Gonzalez & Sol	0:50
7.	"Remember Me (Lullaby)"	Anderson-Lopez & Lopez	García Bernal, Gabriella Flores & Libertad García Fonzi	1:09
8.	"La Llorona"	Traditional	Sol & Alanna Ubach	2:45
9.	"Remember Me (Reunion)"	Anderson-Lopez & Lopez	Gonzalez & Ana Ofelia Murguía	1:13
10.	"Proud Corazón"	Germaine Franco & Molina	Gonzalez	2:03
11.	"Remember Me (Dúo)"	Anderson-Lopez & Lopez	Miguel feat. Natalia Lafourcade	2:46
12.	"Will He Shoemaker!"			3:19
13.	"Shickering and Dash"			1:24
14.	"Miguel's Got an Axe to Find"			1:18
15.	"The Strum of Destiny"			1:11
16.	"It's All Relative"			2:38
17.	"Crossing the Marigold Bridge"			1:49
18.	"Dept. of Family Reunions"			2:46
19.	"The Skeleton Key to Escape"			3:04
20.	"The Newbie Skeleton Walk"			1:09
21.	"Adiós Chicharrón"			1:45
22.	"Plaza de la Cruz"			0:22
23.	"Family Doubtings"			2:25
24.	"Taking Sides"			0:57
25.	"Fiesta Espectacular"			0:57
26.	"Fiesta con de la Cruz"			2:34
27.	"I Have a Great-Great-Grandson"			1:15
28.	"A Blessing and a Fessing"			4:46
29.	"Cave Dwelling on the Past"			2:22
30.	"Somos Familia"			2:22
31.	"Reunión Familiar de Rivera"			3:05
32.	"A Family Dysfunction"			2:01
33.	"Grabbing a Photo Opportunity"			1:48
34.	"The Show Must Go On"			2:31
35.	"For Whom the Bell Tolls"			2:03
36.	"A Run for the Ages"			1:50
37.	"One Year Later?"			1:01
38.	"Coco – Día de los Muertos Suite"			5:47
Total length:				79:09

Banda Sonora Original
No.	Title	Writer(s)	Performer(s)	Length
1.	"Recuérdame (Interpretada por Ernesto De la Cruz)"	Kristen Anderson-Lopez & Robert Lopez	Marco Antonio Solís	1:49
2.	"Dueto a Través del Tiempo"	Germaine Franco, Michael Giacchino, & Adrian Molina	Solís	1:45
3.	"Juanita"	Germaine Franco & Molina	Gael García Bernal	1:15
4.	"Un Poco Loco"	Germaine Franco & Molina	García Bernal & Luis Ángel Gómez Jaramillo	1:52
5.	"Jálale (Instrumental)"	Holger Beier, Pat Beier, & Camilo Lara	Mexican Institute of Sound	2:54
6.	"El Mundo es mi Familia"	Germaine Franco & Molina	Gómez Jaramillo & Solís	0:50
7.	"Recuérdame (Arrullo)"	Anderson-Lopez & Lopez	García Bernal & Lucy Hernández	1:09
8.	"La Llorona"	Traditional	Solís & Angélica Vale	2:45
9.	"Recuérdame (Reencuentro)"	Anderson-Lopez & Lopez	Rocío Garcel & Gómez Jaramillo	1:13
10.	"El Latido de mi Corazón"	Germaine Franco & Molina	Gómez Jaramillo	2:01
11.	"Recuérdame (Note: Replaces Miguel and Lafourcade's version in the Spanish dub)"	Anderson-Lopez & Lopez	Carlos Rivera	2:43
12.	"Remember Me (Dúo)"	Anderson-Lopez & Lopez	Natalia Lafourcade & Miguel	2:44
13.	"El corrido de Miguel Rivera (Inspirado en "Coco")"		Bronco	3:57
14.	"La Bikina (Inspirado en "Coco")"	Rubén Fuentes	Karol Sevilla	2:56
15.	"Bésame Mucho (Inspirado en "Coco")"	Consuelo Velázquez	Jorge Blanco	2:57
16.	"Un mundo raro (Inspirado en "Coco")"		La Santa Cecilia	3:27
17.	"Recuérdame (Solo) (Inspirado en "Coco")"	Anderson-Lopez & Lopez	Lafourcade	2:43

Banda Sonora Original (Disc 2)
No.	Title	Length
1.	"Will He Shoemaker?"	3:19
2.	"Shrine and Dash"	1:24
3.	"Miguel's Got an Axe to Find"	1:18
4.	"The Strum of Destiny"	1:11
5.	"It's All Relative"	2:38
6.	"Crossing the Marigold Bridge"	1:49
7.	"Dept. of Family Reunions"	2:46
8.	"The Skeleton Key to Escape"	3:04
9.	"The Newbie Skeleton Walk"	1:09
10.	"Adiós Chicharrón"	1:45
11.	"Plaza de la Cruz"	0:22
12.	"Family Doubtings"	2:25
13.	"Taking Sides"	0:57
14.	"Fiesta Espectacular"	0:57
15.	"Fiesta con de la Cruz"	2:34
16.	"I Have a Great-Great-Grandson"	1:15
17.	"A Blessing and a Fessing"	4:46
18.	"Cave Dwelling on the Past"	2:22
19.	"Somos Familia"	2:22
20.	"Reunión Familiar de Rivera"	3:05
21.	"A Family Dysfunction"	2:01
22.	"Grabbing a Photo Opportunity"	1:48
23.	"The Show Must Go On"	2:31
24.	"For Whom the Bell Tolls"	2:03
25.	"A Run for the Ages"	1:50
26.	"One Year Later"	1:01
27.	"Coco – Día de los Muertos Suite"	5:47

Banda Sonora Original em Português
No.	Title	Writer(s)	Performer(s)	Length
1.	"Lembra-te de Mim (Ernesto de la Cruz)"	Kristen Anderson-Lopez & Robert Lopez	Mário Redondo	1:49
2.	"Conselho Muito Necessário"	Germaine Franco, Michael Giacchino, & Adrian Molina	Redondo	1:45
3.	"Quem Não Conhece a Juanita?"	Germaine Franco & Molina	Pedro Leitão	1:15
4.	"Un Poco Loco"	Germaine Franco & Molina	Joao Pedro Gonçalves & Leitão	1:52
5.	"Jálale (Instrumental)"	Holger Beier, Pat Beier, & Camilo Lara	Mexican Institute of Sound	2:54
6.	"O Mundo es Mi Família"	Germaine Franco & Molina	Gonçalves & Redondo	0:50
7.	"Lembra-te de Mim (Canção de Embalar)"	Anderson-Lopez & Lopez	Leitão & Maria Galante	1:09
8.	"La Llorona"	Traditional	Alanna Ubach & Antonio Sol	2:45
9.	"Lembra-te de Mim (Reunião)"	Anderson-Lopez & Lopez	Gonçalves & Ermelinda Duarte	1:13
10.	"Pulsar do Meu Corazón"	Germaine Franco & Molina	Gonçalves	2:03
11.	"Remember Me (Dúo)"	Anderson-Lopez & Lopez	Natalia Lafourcade & Miguel	2:44
12.	"Will He Shoemaker?"			3:19
13.	"Shrine and Dash"			1:24
14.	"Miguel's Got an Axe to Find"			1:18
15.	"The Strum of Destiny"			1:11
16.	"It's All Relative"			2:38
17.	"Crossing the Marigold Bridge"			1:49
18.	"Dept. of Family Reunions"			2:46
19.	"The Skeleton Key to Escape"			3:04
20.	"The Newbie Skeleton Walk"			1:09
21.	"Adiós Chicharrón"			1:45
22.	"Plaza de la Cruz"			0:22
23.	"Family Doubtings"			2:25
24.	"Taking Sides"			0:57
25.	"Fiesta Espectacular"			0:57
26.	"Fiesta con de la Cruz"			2:34
27.	"I Have a Great-Great-Grandson"			1:15
28.	"A Blessing and a Fessing"			4:46
29.	"Cave Dwelling on the Past"			2:22
30.	"Somos Familia"			2:22
31.	"Reunión Familiar de Rivera"			3:05
32.	"A Family Dysfunction"			2:01
33.	"Grabbing a Photo Opportunity"			1:48
34.	"The Show Must Go On"			2:31
35.	"For Whom the Bell Tolls"			2:03
36.	"A Run for the Ages"			1:50
37.	"One Year Later"			1:01
38.	"Coco – Día de los Muertos Suite"			5:47

== Certifications ==
Region	Certification	Certified units/sales
Mexico (AMPROFON)	3× Platinum+Gold	210,000^{‡}
United Kingdom (BPI)	Silver	60,000^{‡}
United States (RIAA)	Gold	500,000^{‡}
^{‡} Sales+streaming figures based on certification alone.
