= Lightyear (soundtrack) =

Lightyear (Original Motion Picture Soundtrack)

Soundtrack album by Michael Giacchino
- Released: June 17, 2022
- Recorded: 2021–2022
- Studios: Eastwood Scoring Stage (Orchestra); Newman Scoring Stage (Choir)
- Genres: Electronic; techno pop; film score
- Length: 1:16:14
- Label: Walt Disney
- Producer: Michael Giacchino

Michael Giacchino chronology
Jurassic World Dominion (2022)	Lightyear (2022)	Thor: Love and Thunder (2022)

Singles from Lightyear (Original Motion Picture Soundtrack)
- 1. "Mission Perpetual" Released: June 3, 2022

Lightyear (Original Motion Picture Soundtrack) is the soundtrack album to the 2022 Disney/Pixar film of the same name. The score is composed by Michael Giacchino, in his eighth Pixar film as well as his 50th film as a film score composer. Giacchino stated that the score is a blend of several works based on space opera in various formats, and he experienced in his childhood period. The scoring was held remotely during the COVID-19 pandemic at the Eastwood Scoring Stage and Newman Scoring Stage in Los Angeles for 15 days which required a 39-member choir and 89-member orchestra.

A track "Mission Perpetual" was released as a single on June 3, 2022, and the score album was released in Dolby Atmos by Walt Disney Records on June 17, 2022. The score received positive critical reviews, praising Giacchino's compositions.

== Production ==
=== Background ===
"Even though it was with a character that we knew, it was a different version of that character. It was a different world for that character. It was the real Buzz Lightyear, so we were able to take it in directions that [we] might not have, had we'd been dealing with the actual toy Buzz Lightyear, which is a very different character whom I love as well and who was lucky enough to have had Randy Newman write all his music for him, because Randy is one of the best. It was a fun challenge to go for it and create something fun that came truly from my 12-year-old heart."

— Giacchino, on creating the theme for Lightyear

On January 25, 2022, Michael Giacchino was announced to compose the film's score. It eventually marked his first Toy Story-based theatrical feature, after previously scoring for the television specials based on the franchise, Toy Story of Terror! (2013) and Toy Story That Time Forgot (2014), the former was directed by Angus MacLane, and is the second time, Giacchino eventually scored for an instalment that was previously composed by Randy Newman after Cars 2 (2011). He stated the score is a blend of all the space opera films and television shows, including Star Trek, Star Wars and Alien franchise.

Giacchino said that creating the film score was more about thinking about the science-fiction and adventure movies that he grew up loving. Through this score, he wanted kids in the current generation to experience the way, he had during his childhood.

Giacchino stated that the score made references to his earlier work, including a nod to the television series Star Trek in the first five minutes. On using the references, Giacchino said "At some point, you put it out there. It's for fun; let's just see if they notice, and they do. But there's always a reason for the connections. If I do that, there's always a thematic reason for it. It's never just because; there's always a reason behind it."

=== Recording ===
The scoring was held at the Eastwood Scoring Stage and Newman Scoring Stage in Los Angeles, mostly during the COVID-19 lockdown period in late-2021. 39 vocalists from Los Angeles Master Chorale and 89 musicians from the Los Angeles Philharmonic Orchestra, worked on the choral and orchestral pieces used in the score. The recording was split into multiple sessions. Giacchino had to record the orchestral pieces separately, as he could not bring the ensemble together due to lockdown restrictions. The musicians had to be separated by 6 to 10 feet distance while recording, and had to manually record the score on a day basis. By this, Giacchino took about 15–18 days on working on the score, as normally, he would finish scoring for a film within 5 days. He also faced several challenges during recording, with woodwinds had to be placed in plastic boxes in front of them and brass instruments being surrounded in plastic shower curtains, as a result, "the musicians could not hear each other while recording or even notice their body language".

== Release ==
"Mission Perpetual", a track from the score album was released as a single on June 3, 2022. Commenting on the track, Giacchino stated it as one of his favourite tracks to work on the film, while further saying in an interview to Variety: "It was an exciting challenge to work for me because there were so many things the music needed to convey: Buzz's frustration with himself and the sadness of being alone in his pursuit, but also his undying ambition and drive to achieve his goal." He opined that, he went through a similar "mission" on the track, which was "incredibly rewarding". The album was released through Dolby Atmos on June 17, 2022, by Walt Disney Records.

== Reception ==
The score was positively received by critics and was acclaimed in the film reviews. David Rooney of The Hollywood Reporter stated Giacchino's "robust orchestral score", ranges from "quiet, intimate moments through hard-charging suspense to triumphal jubilation". RogerEbert.com-based critic Odie Henderson called it as "one of Giacchino's best scores" and "a delectable spoof of bombastic space movie music that elevates every scene it plays under". He further added that, the composition in the film's opening scene, was reminiscent of his work similar to the opening sequence in Up (2009), which fetched him the Academy Award for Best Original Score.

Star Tribune-based Chris Hewitt stated the score as "sensitive". Dana Stevens of Slate complimented "Giacchino's score soars movingly or bounces merrily as required by the story". In a more contrasting review, The Denver Post's John Wenzel, though calling the score as "stirring", had attributed that "it never justifies beyond commercial expansion". DiscussingFilm's Aaron Escobar wrote "Giacchino produces a score for the hero that might sound a little familiar to fans of the Toy Story series, though in actuality, is made completely from scratch. Giacchino creates a brass-infused theme that with each build-up makes the viewer want to buckle up next to these Space Rangers for the ride ahead, proving once again what a good luck charm he's become for Pixar."

About the first track "Mission Perpetual", Collider's Ryan O'Rourke had stated "The track fits the vibe of a grand space adventure, sounding like the background music to the start of a mission to the stars. With how it swells and dips, it represents the possible success and failure Buzz and company could face. For as whimsical as it is and how much it builds towards its energetic end, there are some darker notes throughout that could indicate the danger of the mission and general fear and frustration over failure."

== Track listing ==
All tracks are written and composed by Michael Giacchino.

No.	Title	Length
1.	"Mission Log"	2:23
2.	"Initial Greetings"	4:13
3.	"Lightyear"	2:45
4.	"The Best Laid Flight Plans of Space and Men"	1:15
5.	"Blown on Course"	1:37
6.	"A Hyper Failure"	0:55
7.	"Lightyear's Behind"	1:45
8.	"Mission Perpetual"	2:41
9.	"The Lone Space Ranger"	2:24
10.	"Afternoon Delight Speed"	4:13
11.	"Light Speed at the End of the Tunnel"	0:34
12.	"Relative Success"	0:41
13.	"Zurg Awakens"	1:53
14.	"Operation Surprise Party"	0:44
15.	"A Good Day to Not Die"	2:38
16.	"Zurg's Displeasure"	0:30
17.	"Space Afraiders"	3:57
18.	"Zurg-onomics"	2:00
19.	"Oh, Hover"	2:57
20.	"Mistake It All In"	1:33
21.	"Buzz, Meet Zurg"	1:33
22.	"To Infinity and Be Gone"	4:13
23.	"Hawthorn in Her Side"	0:59
24.	"World's Worst Self-Destruct Sequence"	1:39
25.	"Time to Space Your Fears"	4:01
26.	"Hiding from Yourself"	1:21
27.	"Improv-Izzy-tion"	0:50
28.	"Back to Buzzness"	3:10
29.	"Home on Space Range"	2:59
30.	"Infinite MOEtion"	2:06
31.	"One Suite Buzz"	12:19

== Additional music ==
The track "Starman" by David Bowie was featured in the first trailer of the film, and The Black Keys' "Lonely Boy" was featured in the special look trailer. The tracks were used for promotional purposes, and was neither featured in the soundtrack, nor in the film.

== Chart performance ==
Chart (2022)	Position
US Soundtrack Albums (Billboard)	5

== Personnel ==
Credits adapted from Spotify.

- Marshall Bowen – orchestra conductor
- Connie Boylan – assistant orchestra contractor, assistant score contractor
- Aleta Braxton – score vocalist
- Warren Brown – score mixing
- Reid Bruton – score vocalist
- Amick Byram – score vocalist
- Alvin Chea – score vocalist
- Stephen M. Davis – music editor
- George Doering – guitar
- Monique Donnelly – score vocalist
- Dylan Gentile – score vocalist
- William Kenneth Goldman – score vocalist
- Curtis Green – additional music
- Emma Gunn – score vocalist
- Levi Gunn – score vocalist
- Vangie Gunn – vocal contractor, soloist, choir conductor
- Christine Guter – score vocalist
- Tom Hardisty – score recordist
- Ayana Haviv – score vocalist
- Jeff Kryka – orchestrator
- Keri Larson – score vocalist
- William Wells Learned III – music editor
- Edie Lehmann Boddicker – score vocalist
- Mark LeVang – piano, celeste
- Ben Han-Wei Lin – score vocalist
- Rick Logan – score vocalist
- David Loucks – score vocalist
- Tom MacDougall – executive music producer
- Sara Mann – score vocalist
- Baraka May – score vocalist
- Tonoccus McClain – score vocalist
- Martin McClellan – music preparation
- Claude McKnight – score vocalist
- Aaron Meyer – music preparation
- Charissa Nielsen – score vocalist
- Pedro Osuna–orchestrator
- Jasper Randall – score vocalist
- Erin Michael Rettig – scoring stage engineer
- Hannah Marie Ruston – score vocalist
- Ann Marie Sheridan – score vocalist
- Fletcher Sheridan – score vocalist
- Connor Warren Smith – score vocalist
- Beinn-Mhor Logan Stewart – score vocalist
- Joe Stone–oboe and English horn
- Todd Strange – score vocalist
- Ellena Taylor – score vocalist
- Natalie Babbitt Taylor – score vocalist
- Andrew James Thomas – score vocalist
- Suzanne Waters – score vocalist
- John West – score vocalist
- Greg Whipple – score vocalist
- Booker White – music preparation
- Gerald White–score vocalist
- Elyse Willis–score vocalist
- Reggie Wilson – orchestra contractor, score contractor
