= Jurassic World: Fallen Kingdom (film score) =

Jurassic World: Fallen Kingdom (Original Motion Picture Soundtrack)

Film score by Michael Giacchino
- Released: June 15, 2018
- Studio: Abbey Road Studios
- Genre: Soundtrack
- Length: 1:15:04 (Physical); 1:19:51 (Digital)
- Label: Back Lot Music
- Producer: Michael Giacchino

Michael Giacchino chronology
Incredibles 2: Original Motion Picture Soundtrack (2018)	Jurassic World: Fallen Kingdom (Original Motion Picture Soundtrack) (2018)	Bad Times at the El Royale (2018)

Professional ratings
Review scores
Source	Rating
Movie Wave	4.5/5 stars
Filmtracks	4/5 stars

Jurassic World: Fallen Kingdom (Original Motion Picture Soundtrack) is the film score for the 2018 film of the same name composed by Michael Giacchino. The album was released by Back Lot Music on June 15, 2018 digitally and physically.

== Background ==
Following his previous work on the 2015 film Jurassic World, Giacchino confirmed in December 2016 that he would return to score the film's sequel. At the moment he was also working for several other films, including Spider-Man: Homecoming, War of the Planet of the Apes, and Incredibles 2. Ludwig Wicki conducted the score and Jeff Kryka provided the orchestrations.

== Track listing ==
All the music is composed by Michael Giacchino. The soundtrack's last track "At Jurassic World's End Credits/Suite", contains the original music from the theme of the 1993 film Jurassic Park, composed by John Williams. Other, more subtle, uses of the Jurassic Park theme are found in "Nostalgia-Saurus", "Volcano to Death", where it is used in a minor key, and an unreleased piano recording used during a scene in the Lockwood Manor where Claire tells Owen about the first time she saw a dinosaur.

All tracks are written by Michael Giacchino.

Jurassic World: Fallen Kingdom (Original Motion Picture Soundtrack)
No.	Title	Length
1.	"This Title Makes Me Jurassic"	2:54
2.	"The Theropod Preservation Society" (includes Jurassic Park theme by John Williams)	3:47
3.	"Maisie and the Island"	2:07
4.	"March of the Wheatley Cavalcade"	2:14
5.	"Nostalgia-Saurus" (includes Jurassic Park theme by John Williams)	1:05
6.	"Lava Land"	3:17
7.	"Keep Calm and Baryonyx"	2:46
8.	"Go With the Pyroclastic Flow"	3:43
9.	"Raiders of the Lost Isla Nublar"	3:20
10.	"Volcano to Death" (includes Jurassic Park theme by John Williams)	1:38
11.	"Operation Blue Blood"	3:43
12.	"Jurassic Pillow Talk"	2:47
13.	"How to Pick a Lockwood"	3:10
14.	"Wilting Iris"	1:11
15.	"Shock and Auction"	2:28
16.	"Thus Begins the Indo-Rapture"	3:41
17.	"You Can Be So Hard-Headed"	2:28
18.	"Between the Devil and the Deep Blue Free"	3:29
19.	"There's Something About Maisie"	1:20
20.	"World's Worst Bedtime Storyteller"	2:27
21.	"Declaration of Indo-Pendence"	4:02
22.	"To Free or Not to Free" (includes Jurassic Park theme by John Williams)	3:00
23.	"The Neo-Jurassic Age"	3:33
24.	"At Jurassic World's End Credits / Suite" (includes Jurassic Park theme by John Williams)	10:55
Total length:		75:04

All tracks are written by Michael Giacchino.

Jurassic World: Fallen Kingdom (Original Motion Picture Soundtrack) [Deluxe Edition]
No.	Title	Length
1.	"This Title Makes Me Jurassic"	2:54
2.	"The Theropod Preservation Society" (includes Jurassic Park theme by John Williams)	3:47
3.	"Maisie and the Island"	2:07
4.	"March of the Wheatley Cavalcade"	2:14
5.	"Nostalgia-Saurus" (includes Jurassic Park theme by John Williams)	1:05
6.	"Double Cross to Bear"	2:32
7.	"Lava Land"	3:17
8.	"Keep Calm and Baryonyx"	2:46
9.	"Go With the Pyroclastic Flow"	3:43
10.	"Gyro Can You Go?"	2:17
11.	"Raiders of the Lost Isla Nublar"	3:20
12.	"Volcano to Death" (includes Jurassic Park theme by John Williams)	1:38
13.	"Operation Blue Blood"	3:43
14.	"Jurassic Pillow Talk"	2:47
15.	"How to Pick a Lockwood"	3:10
16.	"Wilting Iris"	1:11
17.	"Shock and Auction"	2:28
18.	"Thus Begins the Indo-Rapture"	3:41
19.	"You Can Be So Hard-Headed"	2:28
20.	"Between the Devil and the Deep Blue Free"	3:29
21.	"There's Something About Maisie"	1:20
22.	"World's Worst Bedtime Storyteller"	2:27
23.	"Declaration of Indo-Pendence"	4:02
24.	"To Free or Not to Free" (includes Jurassic Park theme by John Williams)	3:00
25.	"The Neo-Jurassic Age"	3:33
26.	"At Jurassic World's End Credits / Suite" (includes Jurassic Park theme by John Williams)	10:55
Total length:		75:04

== Charts ==
Chart (2018)	Peak position
US Billboard Soundtracks	39
