= The Amazing Spider-Man (soundtrack) =

The Amazing Spider-Man: Music from the Motion Picture

Film score by James Horner
- Released: July 3, 2012
- Length: 76:53
- Label: Sony Classical

James Horner chronology
Cristiada (2012)	The Amazing Spider-Man: Music from the Motion Picture (2012)	Wolf Totem (2015)

Professional ratings
Review scores
Source	Rating
AllMusic	3.5/5 stars
Empire	3/5 stars
Film Score Reviews	4/5 stars
Filmtracks	4/5 stars
Movie Music UK	4.5/5 stars
Movie Wave	4/5 stars

The Amazing Spider-Man: Music from the Motion Picture is a soundtrack album to the 2012 film The Amazing Spider-Man, composed and conducted by James Horner and released by Sony Classical.

== Track listing ==
All music is composed by James Horner.

No.	Title	Length
1.	"Main Title – Young Peter"	4:54
2.	"Becoming Spider-Man"	4:16
3.	"Playing Basketball"	1:22
4.	"Hunting for Information"	2:07
5.	"The Briefcase"	3:14
6.	"The Spider Room – Rumble in the Subway"	3:20
7.	"Secrets"	2:30
8.	"The Equation"	4:22
9.	"The Ganali Device"	2:28
10.	"Ben's Death"	5:41
11.	"Metamorphosis"	3:04
12.	"Rooftop Kiss"	2:34
13.	"The Bridge"	5:15
14.	"Peter's Suspicions"	3:01
15.	"Making a Silk Trap"	2:52
16.	"Lizard at School!"	2:57
17.	"Saving New York"	7:52
18.	"Oscorp Tower"	3:22
19.	"I Can't See You Anymore"	6:50
20.	"Promises – Spider-Man End Titles"	4:52
Total length:		1:16:53

== Additional music ==
- "No Way Down" - Written by James Mercer and performed by The Shins
- "Big Brat" - Written by Alexander Greenwald and performed by Phantom Planet
- "Til Kingdom Come" - Written and performed by Coldplay
- "0 Game" - Written and performed by Spyair

== Charts ==
Chart (2012)	Peak position
Spanish Albums Chart	97
