= Spider-Man: Far From Home (soundtrack) =

Spider-Man: Far From Home (Original Motion Picture Soundtrack)

Film score by Michael Giacchino
- Released: June 28, 2019
- Genre: Film score
- Length: 79:43
- Label: Sony Classical

Michael Giacchino chronology
| Bad Times at the El Royale (2018) | Spider-Man: Far From Home (Original Motion Picture Soundtrack) (2019) | Jojo Rabbit (2019) |

Spider-Man: Far From Home (Original Motion Picture Soundtrack) is the film score to the Columbia Pictures / Marvel Studios film Spider-Man: Far From Home composed by Michael Giacchino. The soundtrack album was released by Sony Classical on June 28, 2019.

== Background ==
Spider-Man: Homecoming composer Michael Giacchino was confirmed to return to score Far From Home in October 2018.

The Japanese version features a song by Ling Tosite Sigure, titled "Neighbormind." The band's lead singer, TK, previously provided the theme song for the Japanese version of Spider-Man: Into the Spider-Verse.

== Track listing ==
All music composed by Michael Giacchino except where otherwise noted.

| No. | Title | Length |
|---|---|---|
| 1. | "Far From Home Suite Home" | 8:27 |
| 2. | "It's Perfect" | 0:30 |
| 3. | "World's Worst Water Feature" | 7:30 |
| 4. | "Multiple Realities" ( (Note: This track references Alan Silvestri's theme from The Avengers.)) | 3:32 |
| 5. | "Brad to the Drone" | 3:32 |
| 6. | "Change of Plans" | 2:28 |
| 7. | "Night Monkey Knows How to Do It" | 0:19 |
| 8. | "Mr. One Hundred and One" | 3:20 |
| 9. | "Prague Rocked" | 3:43 |
| 10. | "Who's Behind Those Foster Grants" | 2:57 |
| 11. | "Power to the People" | 3:33 |
| 12. | "Personal Hijinks" | 3:53 |
| 13. | "Praguenosis: BAD" | 1:08 |
| 14. | "A Lot of 'Splaining to Do" | 2:14 |
| 15. | "The Magical Mysterio Tour" | 3:21 |
| 16. | "Taking the Gullible Express / Spidey Sensitive" | 5:07 |
| 17. | "Gloom and Doom" | 4:16 |
| 18. | "High and Flighty" | 2:20 |
| 19. | "An Internal Battle" | 1:50 |
| 20. | "Happy Landings" | 2:58 |
| 21. | "Tower of Cower" | 5:12 |
| 22. | "Bridging the Trap" | 1:58 |
| 23. | "Bridge and Love's Burning" | 2:50 |
| 24. | "Swinging Set" | 1:47 |
| 25. | "And Now This..." | 0:58 |
| Total length: | | 79:43 |

== Personnel ==
- Composer/Score Producer - Michael Giacchino
- Orchestrator - Jeff Kryka
- Conductor - Marshall Bowen
- Score Recorder/Mixer - Peter Cobbin, Kirsty Whalley
- Synth Technician - Warren Brown
- Score Editor - David Menke
- Additional Score Preparations - Pierre Derycz, Ian Gottlieb, Curtis Green

== Additional music ==
Whitney Houston's "I Will Always Love You" plays during the Marvel Studios opening logo as part of the film's opening "in memoriam" scene. The Italian songs "Bongo Cha Cha Cha" by Caterina Valente, "Stella stai" by Umberto Tozzi, and "Amore di tabacco" by Mina were included in some of the scenes set in Venice. "Back in Black" by AC/DC (which was previously featured in Iron Man), "I Wanna Be Your Boyfriend" by the Ramones, and "Vacation" by the Go-Go's are also featured in the film. More vacation-themed and European songs are featured in this movie as well.
