= Music of Jojo Rabbit =

2019 soundtrack albums

The music for the 2019 film Jojo Rabbit, was composed, orchestrated and supervised by Michael Giacchino. Regarding the score, Giacchino explained, "I didn't want the music to be funny. The bulk of the movie has this huge heart, especially in the character of Jojo himself, and I wanted to make sure I wasn't adding to the zaniness. I wanted to underline the emotional component. For me, it's a devastating story but in the end an uplifting one. With everything we're going through now, it felt like something important to be a part of." Around 45 minutes of the score was conducted and recorded by Giacchino at the Abbey Road Studios in London with a 35-piece orchestra. The film also features a soundtrack album that had songs incorporated from various artists. The soundtrack and score is influenced of contemporary music originated in West Germany, suiting with the theme and mood of the film.

== Overview ==
Giacchino recalled Waititi saying, "Do you remember what you did for Up? Just do that", pointing to that score's fairy tale-like melody, naturally evoking themes of love and loss. Contrary to what he usually does, Giacchino read the screenplay and discussed the tone of the score with Waititi, who said that he did not need a comical tone, as the film itself is already comical. Giacchino pledged to use music to emphasize the film's deep emotions instead of its humor, in order to retain the film's message, and to try to musicalize Nazi Germany from Jojo's perspective; he recalled this being a challenge. When asking himself "What feeling do you want people to walk away with from this movie?", Giacchino answered to himself: "Jojo going from a closed-off, blinders-on attitude about the world to having his worldview smashed open to starting to see everything in a very different way."

Immediately after seeing the film, Giacchino went back to his house and created an 11-minute suite "that showed the course of [Jojo's] character." This would later become the film's theme music. The main melody of the suite is played throughout the film in various different styles, ranging from marches (happy) to adagios (melancholic), which adapt to the emotion embodying each specific scene. The first version features a German children's choir singing lyrics written by Elyssa Samsel and translated by Dirk Richard Heidinger that, when translated, praise Nazism and fascism; Giacchino hoped that by the end of the film the feeling of the lyrics would get to the audience. Caludia Vašeková coordinated the choir, and music preparation was done by Jill Streater and Global Music Services. The vocals, done by Trinity Boys Choir, were contracted by Susie Gillis for Isobel Griffiths Ltd. The choirs were recorded in December 2018 at Abbey Road Studios, London. Freddie Jamison, part of Trinity Boys, was the vocal soloist in another version of the suite. Adult vocalists were from London Voices.

In the other tracks, Giacchino found inspiration in old-time European classical music, such as that of Frédéric Chopin, Franz Liszt, and Erik Satie. Following the suite, he composed for a 22-piece orchestra with a string quartet at its center, as well as piano, a couple of guitars, some brass and percussion. Though Giacchino often composes for a 100-piece orchestra, he felt that, for Jojo Rabbit, "the smaller the orchestra, the more emotional the sound." Giacchino experimented with guitars in various tracks, such as "Jojo's Infirmary Period", which is played when Jojo is being hospitalized after being blasted by a Stielhandgranate. Harps were also used in some melancholic tracks, such as "Beyond Questions" (played when Rosie visits Elsa in the attic) and "The Kids Are All Reich" (played when Jojo reflects on his ideology when witnessing war violence). The latter was described by Giacchino as "an elegy". Waititi responded positively to Giacchino's score, thinking that it "elevated the film to a new level, increasing the emotional resonance and tying the themes, characters and world of the movie together."

== Jojo Rabbit (Original Motion Picture Soundtrack) ==
Jojo Rabbit (Original Motion Picture Soundtrack)

Soundtrack album by Various artists
- Released: October 18, 2019
- Length: 40:38
- Labels: Hollywood; Fox Music

Incorporated music in the film was packaged as a soundtrack album, notably "Helden", the German version of "Heroes" by David Bowie, and "Komm, gib mir deine Hand", the German version of "I Want to Hold Your Hand" by the Beatles. While watching documentaries on the Hitler Youth during research, Waititi noted "similarities between the crowd at Hitler's rallies and the frenzy at Beatles concerts". Giacchino helped secure the rights to the song by contacting Paul McCartney, with whom he had previously worked. The soundtrack consisting of 12 tracks was released on October 18, 2019, the day of Jojo Rabbit's theatrical release, by Hollywood Records, Fox Music and Universal Music Canada, with the vinyl version being released on November 22.

Screenrant reviewed that "Jojo Rabbit's soundtrack features classical compositions, jazz numbers, and pop tunes - including a couple German versions of notable songs. The songs in Jojo Rabbit fall into two categories: those of the era and those that are purposefully anachronistic." Paul Taylor of LemonWire called the soundtrack as "simultaneously surprising and somewhat predictable", and further wrote "The soundtrack to “Jojo Rabbit” brings a decidedly German flair to the anti-hate, black comedy set in Nazi Germany." At the 63rd Annual Grammy Awards, the soundtrack won the nomination for Best Compilation Soundtrack for Visual Media.

=== Track listing ===
No.	Title	Writer(s)	Producer(s)	Length
1.	"Komm, gib mir deine Hand" (German version of the 1963 single "I Want to Hold Your Hand" by The Beatles)	John Lennon; Paul McCartney	George Martin	2:27
2.	"Tabú" (Lecuona Cuban Boys)	Margarita Lecuona		3:11
3.	"The Dipsy Doodle" (Chick Webb ft. Ella Fitzgerald)	Larry Clinton		3:10
4.	"I Don't Wanna Grow Up" (Tom Waits)	Kathleen Brennan; Tom Waits	Kathleen Brennan; Tom Waits	2:31
5.	"Everybody's Gotta Live" (Love)	Arthur Lee		3:20
6.	"Mama" (Roy Orbison)	Joe Melson; Roy Orbison; Roy Rush		2:46
7.	"Helden" (Re-mastered German version of the 1989 single "Heroes" by David Bowie)	David Bowie; Brian Eno	David Bowie; Tony Visconti	3:39
8.	"Jojo's Theme"		Michael Giacchino	3:54
9.	"Waltz And Chorus from Faust (Act II)" (Roger Wagner Chorale and The Hollywood Bowl Symphony Orchestra)	Jules Barbier; Michel Carré	Charles Gounod	4:18
10.	"A Butterfly's Wings"		Michael Giacchino	1:17
11.	"Rosie's Nocturne"		Michael Giacchino	2:37
12.	"Frühlingsstimmen Waltz, Op. 410" (Gerald Wirth, Vienna Boys Choir (Wiener Sängerknaben), The Salonorchester Alt Wien)	Johann Strauss II; Richard Genée	Hartmut Pfannmüller	7:23
Total length:				40:38

=== Additional music ===
"Mit all deiner Liebe (I'm a Believer)", recorded by Jack White (1967), written by Neil Diamond and "Something in the Air", performed by Thunderclap Newman (1969) and written by Speedy Keen, were not included in the soundtrack album. The latter was featured in the film's trailer.

== Jojo Rabbit (Original Score) ==
Jojo Rabbit (Original Score)

Film score by Michael Giacchino
- Released: October 18, 2019
- Studios: Abbey Road Studios, London
- Genre: Film score
- Length: 49:45
- Labels: Hollywood; Fox Music

The original score soundtrack to the film was released on October 18, 2019, coinciding with the film's theatrical release and also with the release of the film's motion picture soundtrack, consisting of incorporated film songs. The soundtracks are distributed by Hollywood Records, Fox Music and Universal Music Canada. The score consisted of 37 tracks recorded at Abbey Road Studios, London.

I thought it was an incredibly timely film [...] We're in a time and place where it's rare to get to work on something that shouts out to the rest of the world the important things we all need to remember. I feel like we're in a time when we need that more than ever. If I could help [Taika] get that message out to the world, that, to me, was the biggest draw for this. The story was incredibly emotional and poignant and timely.

— Michael Giacchino

=== Track listing ===
All music is composed by Michael Giacchino.

No.	Title	Length
1.	"Jojo's March"	1:01
2.	"Rabbit Got Your Tongue"	1:20
3.	"How Jojo Got His Name"	0:30
4.	"Adolf Einleitung in Cheek"	1:02
5.	"Catch the Antelopers"	0:33
6.	"Grenade and Bear It"	0:45
7.	"Jojo's Infirmary Period"	0:53
8.	"A New Uni-deform"	1:12
9.	"From Poster to Postest"	0:25
10.	"The Secret Room"	5:14
11.	"Pickled Pink"	0:44
12.	"Negotiate Your Heart Out"	1:05
13.	"Beyond Questions"	1:07
14.	"No Weak Jews"	0:50
15.	"The Elsa Prophecy"	0:20
16.	"A Boy of Letters"	0:27
17.	"A Game of Names"	0:30
18.	"Mother Joker"	1:16
19.	"A Few of My Shiniest Things"	1:38
20.	"Eye of the Tiger" (String Quartet Version)	2:08
21.	"Get to the Back of the HQ"	0:16
22.	"Proving Your Metal"	0:49
23.	"Elsa's Art Appreciation"	1:55
24.	"Gestapo Making Sense"	4:01
25.	"Don't Speech My Pants"	1:01
26.	"A Butterfly's Wings"	1:16
27.	"Rosie's Nocturne"	2:36
28.	"The Kids Are All Reich"	2:39
29.	"Allies Well That Ends Well"	0:58
30.	"New World Order"	0:57
31.	"A Few Too Germany"	1:10
32.	"What Elsa Is New"	2:01
33.	"Nathan's Last Letter"	0:51
34.	"The Adolf in the Room"	0:41
35.	"A World to the Wise"	0:46
36.	"Elsa Behaved"	0:38
37.	"Jojo's Theme"	3:53
Total length:		49:45
