= Mick Giacchino =

American composer

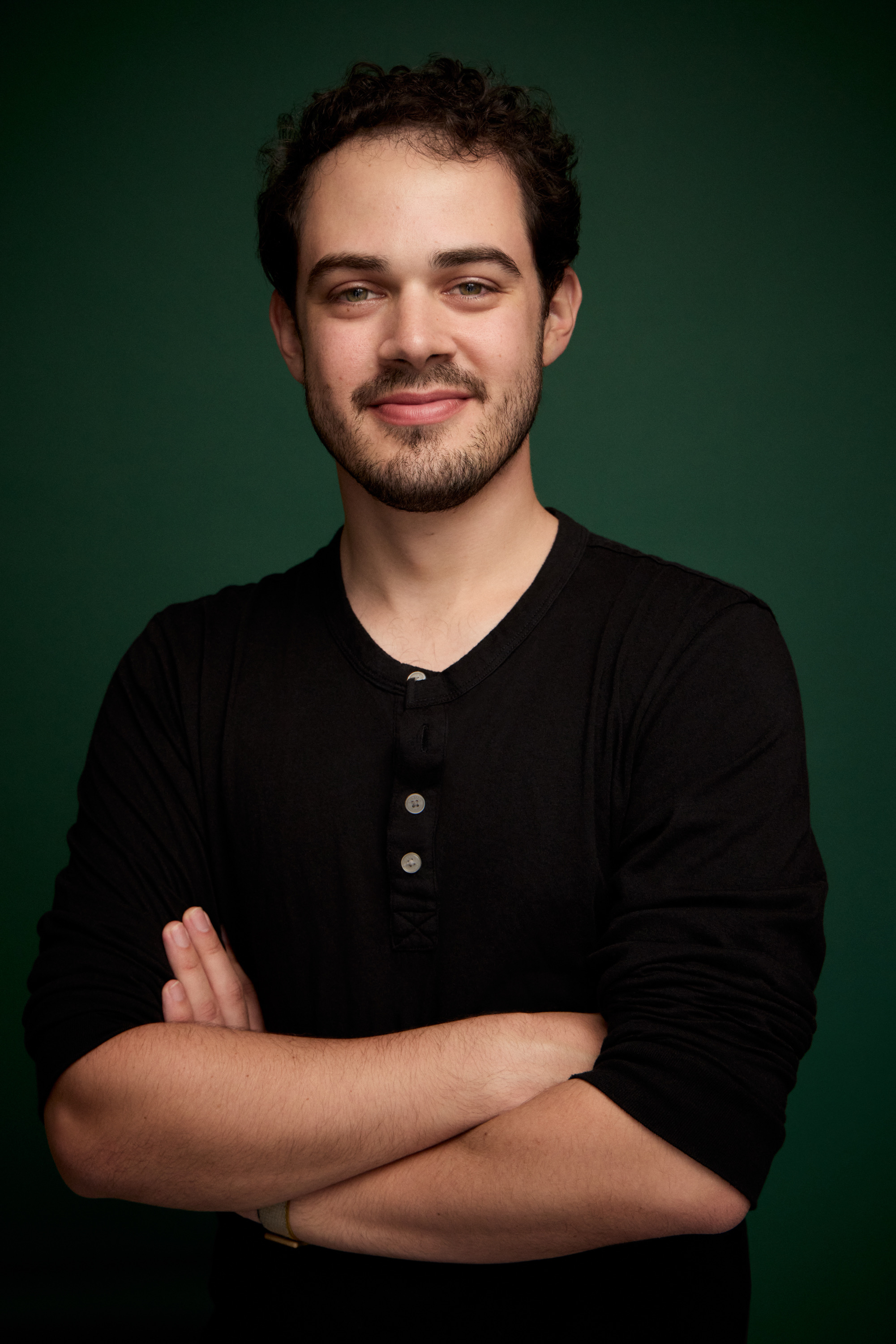

Background information
- Genres: Film score; jazz; rock; electronic
- Occupation: Composer
- Instruments: Piano; keyboards; synthesizer; guitar
- Years active: 2011–present

Michael George "Mick" Giacchino Jr. is an American composer who works in television and film scoring. He received a Primetime Emmy Award for his music to the HBO drama The Penguin.

== Biography ==
Giacchino is the son of music composer Michael Giacchino, and the nephew of documentary filmmaker Anthony Giacchino.

Giacchino's credits include Disney+'s Star Wars: Skeleton Crew, the musical comedy The Muppets Mayhem, AMC+'s western drama That Dirty Black Bag, and the Marvel Television series VisionQuest.

He began working in television scoring with Jim Henson's Turkey Hollow in 2015, and has since contributed to animated and live-action productions including Disney's Zootopia+, Netflix's feature Extinct, and the Netflix series The Curious Creations of Christine McConnell. He also worked on additional music for The Batman.

Outside of screen work, Giacchino has released original instrumental music, debuting with his 2021 EP Perseverance.

== Filmography ==
=== Films ===
Year	Title	Director	Studio(s)	Role
2011	Super 8	J. J. Abrams	Paramount Pictures	Scoring assistant
2017	Spider-Man: Homecoming	Jon Watts	Columbia Pictures; Marvel Studios	Orchestrator
2018	Incredibles 2	Brad Bird	Walt Disney Pictures	Additional music
2021	Extinct	David Silverman	Netflix	Composer, original themes by Michael Giacchino
2021	Spider-Man: No Way Home	Jon Watts	Columbia Pictures; Marvel Studios	Score coordinator
2022	The Batman	Matt Reeves	Warner Bros. Pictures; DC Films	Additional music and orchestrations
2022	Jurassic World Dominion	Colin Trevorrow	Universal Pictures	Additional orchestration
2022	Over There	Ana Isabel Freitas	—N/a	Composer
2023	Next Goal Wins	Taika Waititi	Searchlight Pictures	Additional music

=== Television ===
Year	Title	Studio(s)	Notes
2015	Turkey Hollow	Lifetime	
2018	The Curious Creations of Christine McConnell	Netflix	
2022	That Dirty Black Bag	AMC+	
2022	Zootopia+	Disney+	Co-composed with Curtis Green
2023	The Muppets Mayhem	Disney+	
2024	The Penguin	HBO / DC Studios	Won Primetime Emmy Award for Outstanding Music Composition for a Limited or Anthology Series, Movie or Special (Original Dramatic Score)
2024–2025	Star Wars: Skeleton Crew	Disney+ / Lucasfilm	
2026	VisionQuest	Disney+ / Marvel Television	
