= Lewy (surname) =

Lewy is a surname. Notable people with the surname include:

- Alfred J. Lewy, psychiatrist
- Bergnart Carl Lewy, Danish chemist
- Casimir Lewy, philosopher
- Eduard Constantin Lewy (1796–1846), French-born horn player
- Frederic Lewy, neurologist best known for discovering Lewy bodies
- Glen Lewy, National Chair of the Anti-Defamation League
- Guenter Lewy (1923–2026), German-born American author, political scientist and academic
- Hans Lewy, mathematician
- Israel Lewy, German-Jewish scholar
- Josef Rudolf Lewy (1802–1881), French-born horn player, brother of Eduard Constantin Lewy
- Melanie Lewy (1823–1856), Austrian harpist, daughter of Eduard Constantin Lewy
- Robert Ira Lewy, American doctor
