= Emily Carmichael (filmmaker) =

American film director, writer, and animator

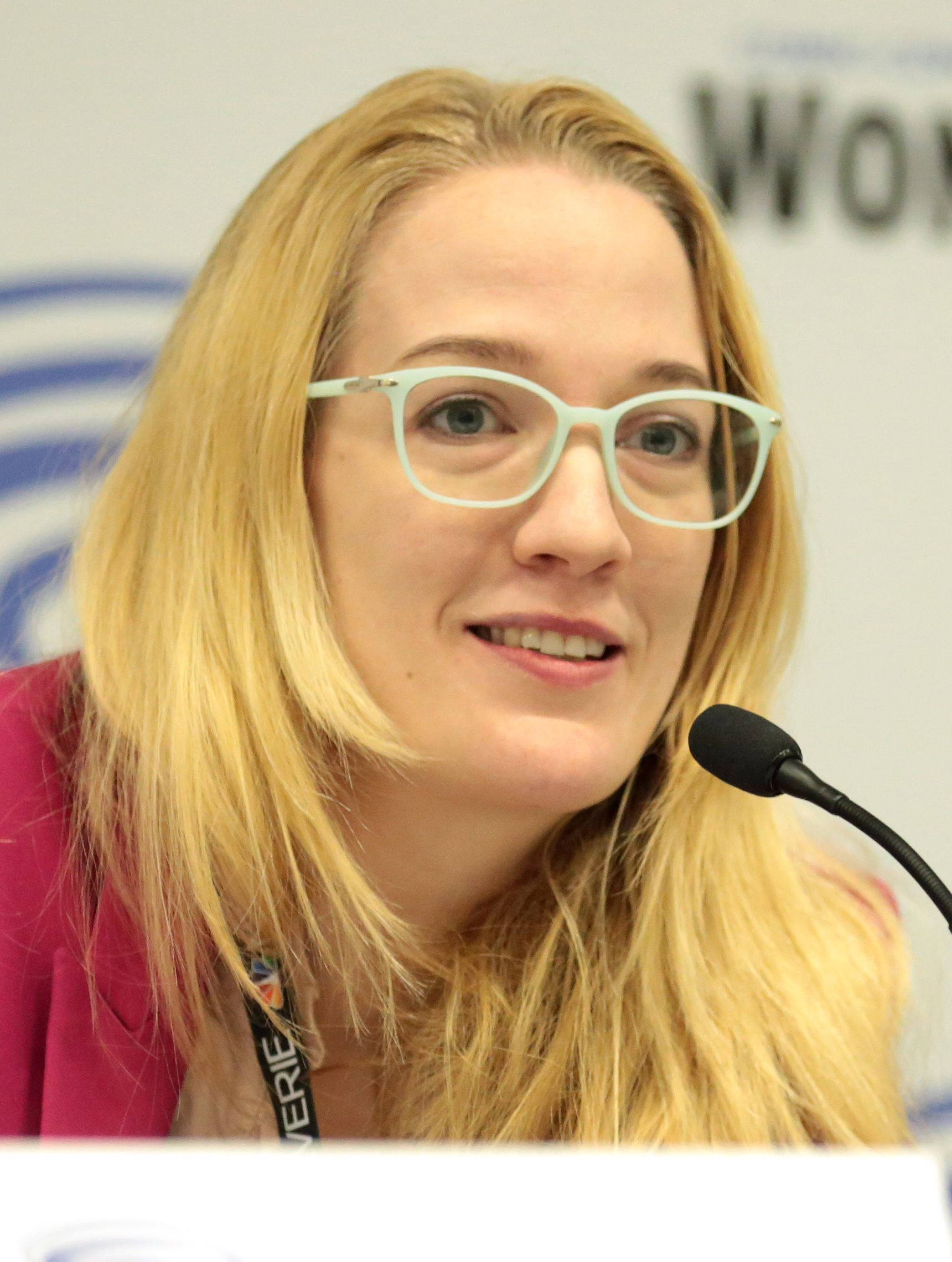
- Carmichael in 2018
- Born: January 27, 1982 (age 44); New York City, U.S.
- Education: Harvard University (BA); New York University (MFA)
- Occupations: Film director, writer, animator
- Years active: 2006–present
- Spouse: Erik Singer (m. 2023)

Emily Carmichael (born January 27, 1982) is an American film director, screenwriter, and animator. Her short films have screened in competition at Sundance, Tribeca, SXSW, Slamdance, and other US and International film festivals. Carmichael co-wrote the screenplay for the 2018 science fiction sequel Pacific Rim: Uprising and the 2022 film Jurassic World: Dominion.

== Early life ==
Carmichael was born in New York City and is a 2000 graduate of Stuyvesant High School. In 1999 she published two essays, "Fight Girl Power" and "Acid Torches of Doom", in the book Ophelia Speaks, an anthology of works by adolescent girls which spent eighteen weeks on The New York Times Best Seller List. Salon's review singled out "Fight Girl Power" as the best of the collection praising fifteen-year-old Carmichael's essay as a "sophisticated, painful, and amusing meditation on girl power."

She graduated from Harvard University in 2004 with a dual BA degree in Literature and Visual and Environmental Studies.

During her time at Harvard she wrote and directed two full-length plays and three short plays at the Loeb Experimental Theater and the Adams House Pool Theater. Her comic strip Whiz Kids, which originated in her high school newspaper, ran in The Crimson over two years. Seth MacFarlane, reviewing student comics for Noise magazine, commended its execution, structure, and "Doonesbury rhythm". The citation for Carmichael's David McCord Prize—an undergraduate honor awarded by Harvard houses for excellence in the arts—referred to her as "...an artistic phenomenon. Or perhaps more accurately...a bizarre frightening mutant artistic freak."

She graduated from New York University's Tisch School of the Arts with an MFA in Film in 2012. In her final year she was a finalist for Tisch's Wasserman Award.

== Career ==
The first season of Carmichael's animated web series The Adventures of Ledo and Ix premiered on Penny Arcade on February 18, 2011, and ran for eight episodes. The first and then second episodes initially premiered as stand alone short films at the 2009 and 2010 Slamdance Film Festival. The first episode was also included in a 2009 online issue of the Wholphin. The series won a Rooftop Filmmaker's Fund Short Film Grant in 2010 and the first three episodes played as part of the Rooftop Film Festival's Summer Series. After a successful Kickstarter campaign on January 28, 2013, production began on the series' second season.

In a review of the series for Gamemoir, Sara Clemens writes "Ledo and Ix are the best game characters you’ve never played, and while it’s true viewing them on the small screen strips away the interactivity that propelled my early adventures on the NES and SNES, watching them interact with each other and various villagers gets to the heart of what made early RPGs so special."

Her spin-off animated short, RPG OKC, premiered at the 2013 Tribeca Film Festival where it was nominated for Best Narrative Short. RPG OKC won Best Short at the 22nd Philadelphia Film Festival and Audience Favorite at the 2014 Science Fiction Fantasy Short Film Festival. Indiewire called it one of the top ten unsung films of 2013 and film critic Eric Kohn touted it as deserving of Oscar consideration in the animated short film category. It was subsequently distributed by the online film showcase MADATOMS.COM.

Carmichael's short film The Ghost and Us, starring Maria Dizzia, premiered at the 2009 Cinevegas Film Festival and won Best Short at Project Twenty1's Philadelphia Film-A-Thon. It screened throughout North America and Europe in 2011 as part of the Viscera Film Festival, a touring horror film festival for women filmmakers. During the tour Carmichael won Best Screenplay and Best Comedic Horror Short.

Her short film The Hunter and the Swan Discuss Their Meeting premiered at the 2011 Sundance Film Festival and was aired in the first episode of the KQED television series Film School Shorts. The film won the Grand Jury Prize at the 2012 Science Fiction Fantasy Short Film Festival, third prize at the 2012 First Run Film Festival, and a Student Grant from the National Board of Review. Filmmaker, in a review of Sundance shorts, called the film "sweet, beautiful, clever, and fun" and "magic and original".

Her short films have played commercial theatrical runs in venues including the Brooklyn Academy of Music (The Adventures of Ledo and Ix/The Hunter and the Swan Discuss Their Meeting), Avery Fisher Hall at Lincoln Center (That's My Majesty), IFC Center (The Hunter and the Swan Discuss Their Meeting/RPG OKC), and the Anthology Film Archives (The Ghost and Us).

Carmichael's feature-length screenplay, Arrow, was named to NYU's 2013 Purple List of best production-ready screenplays by a panel of judges that included Peter Dinklage, Karyn Kusama, and James Belfer. Arrow was also selected by IFP as one of its twenty-five Emerging Narratives for the 34th Edition of Independent Film Week in 2012. In March 2014, Carmichael reported having completed the filming of a short, Stryka, based on characters in her Arrow screenplay starring Rupert Friend and Aimee Mullins. Stryka premiered at the 2015 Aspen Shortsfest.

Filmmaker called her one of the 25 New Faces of Independent Film in its 2013 Summer issue. That same year Fox Digital Studio optioned Carmichael's screenplay The Licking County Giants.

In 2015, she joined Time Warner's artist incubator, OneFifty, to create content for HBO, Warner Bros., and Turner.

In May 2016, Amblin Entertainment announced it had signed Carmichael to write and direct the film Powerhouse, based on an original story by Colin Trevorrow, to be produced by Trevorrow, Steven Spielberg, and Simon Kinberg.

Carmichael was set to direct the film adaptation of Lumberjanes at 20th Century Studios, prior to that project's cancellation by Disney in August 2019 after its acquisition of 21st Century Fox.

== Personal life ==
Carmichael was engaged to vocal coach Erik Singer in June 2022. According to a post on her Instagram, the pair were married in June 2023.

== Filmography ==
Film writer

- Pacific Rim Uprising (2018)
- Jurassic World Dominion (2022)

Short film

| Year | Title | Director | Writer | Producer | Editor | Animator | Actress | Role |
|---|---|---|---|---|---|---|---|---|
| 2008 | Young Love | Yes | Yes | Yes | Yes | No | No | |
| 2008 | That's My Majesty | Yes | Yes | No | Yes | No | No | |
| 2009 | The Adventures of Ledo and Ix | Yes | Yes | Yes | No | Yes | Yes | Ix (voice) |
| 2009 | Slavenka | No | No | No | No | No | Yes | Jan |
| 2009 | The Ghost and Us | Yes | Yes | No | Yes | No | No | |
| 2009 | Play/Stop | Yes | Yes | No | No | No | Yes | Girl on Street |
| 2010 | Ledo and Ix Go to Town | Yes | Yes | No | No | Yes | Yes | Ix (voice) |
| 2010 | Ledo and Ix Battle Epically | Yes | Yes | No | No | Yes | Yes | Ix (voice) |
| 2011 | The Hunter and the Swan Discuss Their Meeting | Yes | Yes | No | No | No | No | |
| 2013 | RPG OKC | Yes | Yes | No | No | Yes | No | |
| 2015 | Stryka | Yes | Yes | No | No | No | No | |
| 2017 | The Enchanted Forest | Yes | Yes | No | No | No | No | |
| 2017 | Famous Last Words | No | No | Yes | Yes | No | No | |
| 2019 | Battle at Big Rock | No | Yes | No | No | No | No | |

Television

| Year | Title | Director | Writer | Producer | Animator | Actress | Role | Notes |
|---|---|---|---|---|---|---|---|---|
| 2011 | The Adventures of Ledo and Ix | Yes | Yes | 1 episode | Yes | Yes | Ix (voice) | 8 episodes |
