= Hamlet and psychoanalysis =

William Shakespeare's play Hamlet has had a significant impact on the field of psychoanalysis.

Sigmund Freud developed his ideas about the Oedipus complex through an analysis of Sophocles' play Oedipus Rex and Shakespeare's play Hamlet. Freud's ideas were further developed by Ernest Jones, whose work was, in its turn, influential on twentieth century performances of Shakespeare's play. Jacques Lacan departed from Freud, and also used Hamlet's situation in the development of his ideas of human desires.

The characters Hamlet and Ophelia have become iconic representations of male and female instability. Psychoanalytic ideas other than Freud's have included Gaston Bachelard's Ophelia complex, and speculations that Prince Hamlet's anxiety derives from a fear that Claudius might be his biological father.

== Background ==
"How if Hamlet had in years gone by, as a child, bitterly resented having had to share in his mother's affection even with his own father, had regarded him as a rival, and had secretly wished him out of the way so that he might enjoy undisputed and undisturbed the monopoly of that affection?" When Hamlet's father died, he could not but feel guilty that his wish had been granted, so his grieving was contaminated by guilt and a manufactured idolization of the missing parent.

— Ann Thompson and Neil Taylor, in turn quoting
Ernest Jones' 1949 Hamlet and Oedipus.

Hamlet has featured in some of the key texts of psychoanalysis, and the characters of Hamlet and Ophelia have become iconic representations of, respectively, male and female instability.

Gaston Bachelard's concept of the Ophelia complex related to the symbolic connections between women, water and death, which particularly merge in a representation of a drowning. Elaine Showalter saw Ophelia as a potent archetype of the connection between female insanity and sexuality: that men may go mad for any number of reasons; but that female madness is relentlessly regarded as related to their bodies and sexual desires.

Sigmund Freud developed his ideas about the Oedipus complex, later expostulated in his The Interpretation of Dreams, from analysing Sophocles' Oedipus Rex and Shakespeare's Hamlet. He concluded that "Shakespeare's unconscious understood the unconscious of his hero." (Note: A letter from Sigmund Freud to Wilhelm Fliess in October 1897, cited by Thompson & Taylor) Freud's ideas about Hamlet were later expanded and adapted by Ernest Jones, and directly influenced some twentieth century productions, including Tyrone Guthrie's 1937 Hamlet starring Laurence Olivier.

Jacques Lacan departed from Freud in his Desire and the interpretation of desire in Hamlet, in which he perceived the Ghost as 'the missing signifier, the veiled phallus'. (Note: Marjorie Garber's "Shakespeare's Ghost Writers: Literature as Uncanny Causality" commenting on Jacques Lacan's "Desire and the interpretation of desire in Hamlet": cited in Thompson and Taylor.) And more recently Tom MacFaul's Problem Fathers in Shakespeare and Renaissance Drama explored the possibility (derived from a suggestion which had been made by Harold Bloom) that Hamlet's anxiety stems from a fear that Claudius, and not Old Hamlet, was his real father.

== Sigmund Freud ==
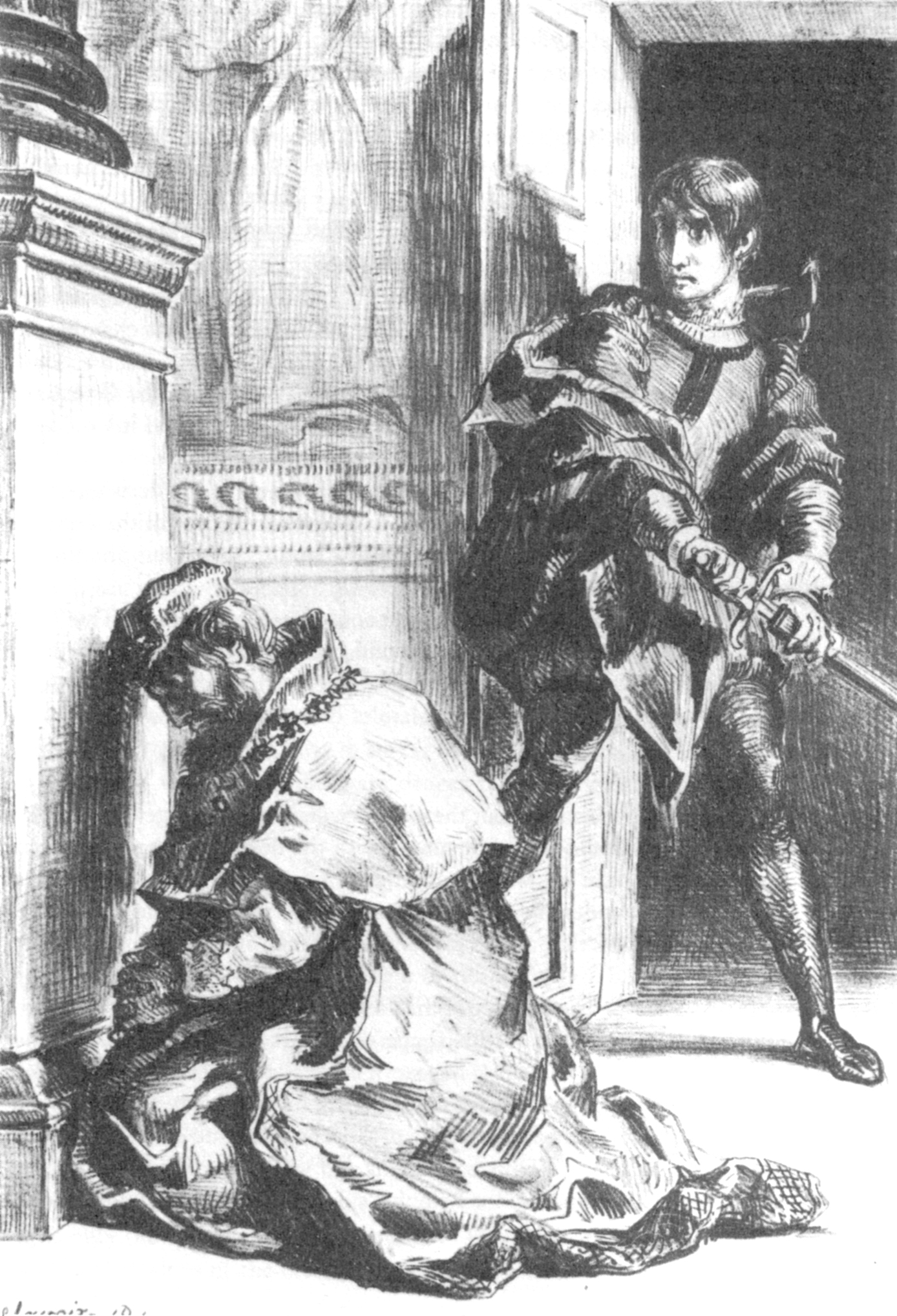
Freud suggested that an unconscious Oedipal conflict caused Hamlet's hesitations (artist: Eugène Delacroix 1844).

Sigmund Freud's thoughts regarding Hamlet were first published in his book The Interpretation of Dreams (1899), as a footnote to a discussion of Sophocles' tragedy, Oedipus Rex, all of which is part of his consideration of the causes of neurosis. Freud does not offer over-all interpretations of the plays, but uses the two tragedies to illustrate and corroborate his psychological theories, which are based on his treatments of his patients and on his studies. Productions of Hamlet have used Freud's ideas to support their own interpretations. In The Interpretation of Dreams, Freud says that according to his experience "parents play a leading part in the infantile psychology of all persons who subsequently become psychoneurotics," and that "falling in love with one parent and hating the other" is a common impulse in early childhood, and is important source material of "subsequent neurosis". He says that "in their amorous or hostile attitude toward their parents" neurotics reveal something that occurs with less intensity "in the minds of the majority of children". Freud considered that Sophocles' tragedy, Oedipus Rex, with its story that involves crimes of parricide and incest, "has furnished us with legendary matter which corroborates" these ideas, and that the "profound and universal validity of the old legends" is understandable only by recognising the validity of these theories of "infantile psychology".

Freud explores the reason "Oedipus Rex is capable of moving a modern reader or playgoer no less powerfully than it moved the contemporary Greeks". He suggests that "It may be that we were all destined to direct our first sexual impulses toward our mothers, and our first impulses of hatred and violence toward our fathers." Freud suggests that we "recoil from the person for whom this primitive wish of our childhood has been fulfilled with all the force of the repression which these wishes have undergone in our minds since childhood".

These ideas, which became a cornerstone of Freud's psychological theories, he named the "Oedipus complex", and, at one point, he considered calling it the "Hamlet complex". Freud considered that Hamlet "is rooted in the same soil as Oedipus Rex". But the difference in the "psychic life" of the two civilisations that produced each play, and the progress made over time of "repression in the emotional life of humanity" can be seen in the way the same material is handled by the two playwrights: In Oedipus Rex incest and murder are brought into the light as might occur in a dream, but in Hamlet these impulses "remain repressed" and we learn of their existence through Hamlet's inhibitions to act out the revenge, while he is shown to be capable of acting decisively and boldly in other contexts. Freud asserts, "The play is based on Hamlet's hesitation in accomplishing the task of revenge assigned to him; the text does not give the cause or the motive of this." The conflict is "deeply hidden".

Hamlet is able to perform any kind of action except taking revenge on the man who murdered his father and has taken his father's place with his mother—Claudius has led Hamlet to realise the repressed desires of his own childhood. The loathing which was supposed to drive him to revenge is replaced by "self-reproach, by conscientious scruples" which tell him "he himself is no better than the murderer whom he is required to punish". Freud suggests that Hamlet's sexual aversion expressed in his "nunnery" conversation with Ophelia supports the idea that Hamlet is "an hysterical subject". (Note: Hamlet 3.1.87–160.)

Freud suggests that the character Hamlet goes through an experience that has three characteristics, which he numbered: 1) "the hero is not psychopathic, but becomes so" during the course of the play. 2) "the repressed desire is one of those that are similarly repressed in all of us." It is a repression that "belongs to an early stage of our individual development". The audience identifies with the character of Hamlet, because "we are victims of the same conflict." 3) It is the nature of theatre that "the struggle of the repressed impulse to become conscious" occurs in both the hero onstage and the spectator, when they are in the grip of their emotions, "in the manner seen in psychoanalytic treatment".

Freud points out that Hamlet is an exception in that psychopathic characters are usually ineffective in stage plays; they "become as useless for the stage as they are for life itself", because they do not inspire insight or empathy, unless the audience is familiar with the character's inner conflict. Freud says, "It is thus the task of the dramatist to transport us into the same illness."

John Barrymore's long-running 1922 performance in New York, directed by Thomas Hopkins, "broke new ground in its Freudian approach to character", in keeping with the post-World War I rebellion against everything Victorian. He had a "blunter intention" than presenting the genteel, sweet prince of 19th-century tradition, imbuing his character with virility and lust.

Beginning in 1910, with the publication of "The Œdipus-Complex as an Explanation of Hamlet's Mystery: A Study in Motive" Ernest Jones—a psychoanalyst and Freud's biographer—developed Freud's ideas into a series of essays that culminated in his book Hamlet and Oedipus (1949). Influenced by Jones's psychoanalytic approach, several productions have portrayed the "closet scene", where Hamlet confronts his mother in her private quarters, in a sexual light. (Note: Hamlet 3.4.) In this reading, Hamlet is disgusted by his mother's "incestuous" relationship with Claudius while simultaneously fearful of killing him, as this would clear Hamlet's path to his mother's bed. Ophelia's madness after her father's death may also be read through the Freudian lens: as a reaction to the death of her hoped-for lover, her father. Ophelia is overwhelmed by having her unfulfilled love for him so abruptly terminated and drifts into the oblivion of insanity. In 1937, Tyrone Guthrie directed Laurence Olivier in a Jones-inspired Hamlet at The Old Vic. Olivier later used some of these same ideas in his 1948 film version of the play.

In the Bloom's Shakespeare Through the Ages volume on Hamlet, editors Bloom and Foster express a conviction that the intentions of Shakespeare in portraying the character of Hamlet in the play exceeded the capacity of the Freudian Oedipus complex to completely encompass the extent of characteristics depicted in Hamlet throughout the tragedy: "For once, Freud regressed in attempting to fasten the Oedipus Complex upon Hamlet: it will not stick, and merely showed that Freud did better than T.S. Eliot, who preferred Coriolanus to Hamlet, or so he said. Who can believe Eliot, when he exposes his own Hamlet Complex by declaring the play to be an aesthetic failure?" The book also notes James Joyce's interpretation, stating that he "did far better in the Library Scene of Ulysses, where Stephen marvellously credits Shakespeare, in this play, with universal fatherhood while accurately implying that Hamlet is fatherless, thus opening a pragmatic gap between Shakespeare and Hamlet."

Joshua Rothman has written in The New Yorker that "we tell the story wrong when we say that Freud used the idea of the Oedipus complex to understand Hamlet". Rothman suggests that "it was the other way around: Hamlet helped Freud understand, and perhaps even invent, psychoanalysis". He concludes: "The Oedipus complex is a misnomer. It should be called the 'Hamlet complex'."

== Jacques Lacan ==
In the 1950s, the French psychoanalyst Jacques Lacan analysed Hamlet to illustrate some of his concepts. His structuralist theories about Hamlet were first presented in a series of seminars given in Paris and later published in "Desire and the Interpretation of Desire in Hamlet". Lacan postulated that the human psyche is determined by structures of language and that the linguistic structures of Hamlet shed light on human desire. His point of departure is Freud's Oedipal theories, and the central theme of mourning that runs through Hamlet. In Lacan's analysis, Hamlet unconsciously assumes the role of phallus—the cause of his inaction—and is increasingly distanced from reality "by mourning, fantasy, narcissism and psychosis", which create holes (or lack) in the real, imaginary, and symbolic aspects of his psyche. Lacan's theories influenced some subsequent literary criticism of Hamlet because of his alternative vision of the play and his use of semantics to explore the play's psychological landscape.
