= Ophelia syndrome =

Ophelia is a character in Shakespeare's play Hamlet. Ophelia syndrome, named after her, may refer to:

- Ophelia syndrome, a medical condition characterized by Hodgkin lymphoma with autoimmune limbic encephalitis, caused by anti-metabotropic glutamate receptor 5 antibodies (mGluR5)
- Ophelia complex, a psychological term
