= Lewys =

Lewys is a Welsh masculine given name. Notable people with the name include:

- Lewys Daron (fl. c. 1495 – c. 1530), Welsh poet
- Lewys Dwnn (c. 1550 – c. 1616), Welsh poet and genealogist
- Lewys Glyn Cothi (c. 1420 – c. 1490), Welsh poet
- Lewys Glyn Dyfi (1826–1891), Welsh preacher and writer
- Lewys Morgannwg (fl. 1520 – 1565), Welsh poet
- Lewys Môn (fl. 1485 – 1527), Welsh poet
- Lewys Twamley (born 2003), Welsh footballer

== See also ==
- Llywelyn
- Lewis
- Lewy
