= Institute for Collaborative Education =

Public school in New York City

Location
- 345 East 15th Street; New York, New York 10003; United States; 40.7329°N 73.9825°W

Information
- Type: Selective Public secondary school
- Established: 1993; 33 years ago
- School district: New York City Department of Education
- NCES School ID: 360007701720
- Principal: Peter Karp
- Faculty: 36 (on FTE basis)
- Grades: 6 to 12
- Enrollment: 480
- Colors: Blue and white
- Athletics: Baseball, Basketball, Soccer, Indoor Track, Softball, Volleyball
- Athletics conference: PSAL
- Newspaper: N.Y.I.C.E Times
- Website: www.iceschoolnyc.org

The Institute for Collaborative Education (also called ICE and Ny.ICE) is a college-preparatory public secondary school (grades 6–12) in the Gramercy Park neighborhood of Manhattan in New York City near Stuyvesant Town–Peter Cooper Village. Part of the DOE's District 2, the school is known for its small class sizes and progressive educational values.

The school is philosophically opposed to high-stakes standardized tests. It is a member of the New York Performance Standards Consortium and is "given a waiver from the chancellor's uniform curriculum." As a Consortium school, ICE's students are exempt from taking most Regents exams. Instead, students present "PBAT" (Performance-Based Assessment Task) projects at the end of each semester to panels of teachers, parents, and outside community members.

Until recently, ICE was a screened school, requiring middle school applicants to submit an essay and undergo an interview. After the COVID-19 pandemic, the school changed to a lottery system, but with two "priority groups":

- Diversity: 50% of the school's seats go to students who qualify for free or reduced-price lunch
- Sibling priority: Students with a sibling currently in 6th through 11th grade at ICE have priority

== History ==
ICE was founded in 1993 by John Pettinato as an educational alternative to the Regents Exam-based testing system in favor of portfolio-based assessment. ICE was also designed to be a haven for unhoused and underserved youths. (Pettinato had earlier founded the Greenwich Village Youth Council, established in 1969.)

Peter Karp, who had been a science teacher at the school since 2001, took over as the school's principal in 2012.

In 2025, the school began rebranding itself as Ny.ICE (pronounced "nice") and using its full name, citing the ICE acronym's negative associations with the United States Immigration and Customs Enforcement.

== Academics ==
=== Overview ===
As part of its commitment to resisting high-stakes standardized tests, the school "specifically invites parents of middle-school students to join the opt-out initiative, asking them to demonstrate support for the kind of teaching and learning the school provides, an approach that is antagonistic to rote test preparation."

The New York Times described ICE's approach to learning as "one that fosters the knowledge and the style of critical thinking that the Common Core and most sane, intelligent people understand as essential. In sixth grade, the year of entry, children currently combine a study of ancient Rome with an analysis and performance of elements of Julius Caesar. In seventh grade, a mock trial is conducted around Macbeth".

Most ICE students stay at the school through high school, with only 5-15 ninth-grade seats available per year.

"Eleventh graders take neuroscience in addition to biology and chemistry."

In keeping with its opposition to high-stakes tests, the school does not offer Advanced Placement courses.

In 2012, ICE "received an 'A' on its DOE progress report and graduated 86.4 percent of its high school students in four years." In 2022, the high school boasted a 98.6% graduation rate.

=== Internships ===
ICE seniors spend the second semester pursuing an internship for 26 hours per week.

== Campus ==
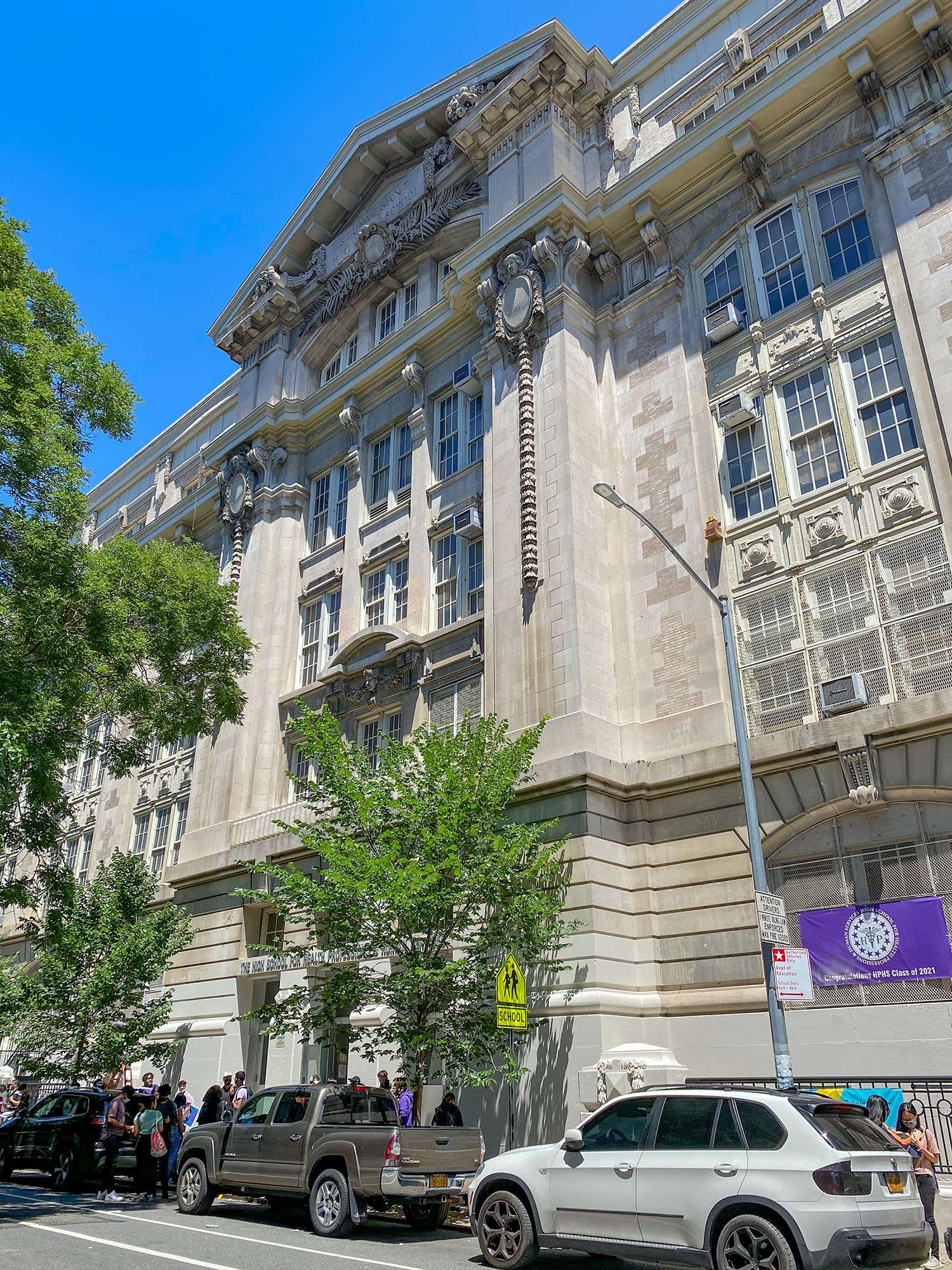
The Old Stuyvesant Campus on East 15th Street, as seen in 2021, which houses (among other schools) the Institute for Collaborative Education

ICE is housed in the old Stuyvesant High School building at 345 East 15th Street, alongside two other schools — the High School for Health Professions and Human Services and P.S. 226, a school for students with moderate to severe developmental disabilities.

== Culture ==
The Institute for Collaborative Education offers an array of organizations, extracurricular activities, and student clubs, including Deeds Art and Literary Magazine, Model United Nations, chess, Art/Fashion Workroom, Museum Club, Community Service Club, the High School Drama Club, Cheer Team, Student Council, Newspaper Club, Baking Club, Girls Leadership Club, Scientific Research Club, Movie Club, Russian Literature Club, Debate, Big Sis Little Sis, Photo Documentary Club, Cooking Club, the Black and Brown Students Union, Disability Pride Club, and Crochet Club.

The school has a renowned student jazz program, with such notable faculty as Roy Nathanson and Albert Marquès.

In keeping with the school's progressive political values, it has been known for student activism, on such issues as advocating for death row inmate Keith LaMar and banning carriage horses.

Educational travel has become an important part of the school's culture, with an annual trip to Nepal where students learn the art of photography as well as the work of the Denali Foundation and the Truth and Reconciliation Commission (Nepal). Other past educational travel destinations include Mexico and Europe. Fundraising efforts at the school ensure that all students, no matter what their family resources, have the ability to go on the trips.

== Model United Nations ==
ICE's Model United Nations debates solutions to international issues, and attends conferences within New York City, as well as throughout the United States. In 2023, ICE's delegation won the NHSMUN conference's First Place Distinction Award for Research and Preparedness.

== Athletics ==
ICE offers an array of athletic teams for its students. Middle school sports include soccer, flag football, and girls basketball; while high school teams include boys' baseball, basketball, and soccer; and girls' basketball, indoor track, soccer, softball, and volleyball.

== Transportation ==
The New York City Subway's First Avenue station, served by the L train, is nearby. Additionally, MTA Regional Bus Operations' M14A, M14D, M15 and M15 SBS routes stop near ICE. Students residing a certain distance from the school are provided full-fare or half-fare student MetroCards for public transportation at the start of each term, based on the distance the student resides from the school.

== Student demographics ==
As of 2025, student demographics were as follows: 46% White, 20% Hispanic, 18% Black, 7% Asian, 9% Other. Approximately 51 out of 100 students are male.

== Principals ==
- 1993–Feb. 2012 John Pettinato
- Feb. 2012–present Peter Karp

== See also ==
- Education in New York City
- List of high schools in New York City
- Public Schools Athletic League
