= Lewy =

Lewy may refer to:

- Lewy (surname)
- Levi, a biblical personage
- Lewy body, abnormal aggregates of protein that develop inside nerve cells of the brain
- Dementia with Lewy bodies, progressive brain disease associated with degenerative dementia in the elderly
- A nickname for Polish footballer Robert Lewandowski (born 1988)
