= The Infernal Machine (play) =

1934 play by Jean Cocteau reinterpreting Oedipus by Sophocles

- 1936 UK edition dust jacket
- Original language: French
- Written by: Jean Cocteau
- Characters: The Voice, The Young Soldier, The Soldier, The Officer, Jocasta, Tiresias, Ghost of King Laius, The Sphinx, Anubis, A Thebian Mother, Her Son, Her Daughter, Oedipus, The Drunk, The Messenger from Corinth, Creon, The Old Shepherd, Antigone
- Genre: Tragedy
- Setting: Thebes, Greece

The Infernal Machine, or La Machine Infernale is a French play by the dramatist Jean Cocteau, based on the ancient Greek myth of Oedipus. The play initially premiered on 10 April 1934, at the Théâtre Louis-Jouvet in Paris, France, under the direction of Louis Jouvet himself, with costumes and scene design by Christian Bérard. The Infernal Machine, as translated by Albert Bermel, was first played at the Phoenix Theatre in New York on 3 February 1958, under the direction of Herbert Berghof, with scenery by Ming Cho Lee, costumes by Alvin Colt, and lighting by Tharon Musser.

== Plot summary ==
=== Prologue ===
The Voice presents a brief prologue and information about events before the play's action takes place. The Voice recounts that a baby is abandoned on a mountainside. The baby, Oedipus, is adopted by the King of Corinth. Oedipus questions the Oracle of Delphi who says he will murder his father and marry his mother. At a crossroads, Oedipus comes to blows with other travelers and unwittingly kills his father, Laius, King of Thebes. After conquering the Sphinx, Oedipus enters Thebes and claims the prize of marrying Queen Jocasta. Again, he unwittingly fulfills the Oracle's prophecy and, in marrying the Queen, marries his mother. After having four children with his mother, everything is brought to light. Jocasta hangs herself and Oedipus blinds himself with his mother's brooch. The Voice finishes with: "Before you is a fully wound machine. Slowly its spring will unwind the entire span of a human life. It is one of the most perfect machines devised by the infernal gods for the mathematical annihilation of a mortal."

=== Act I: The Ghost ===
While guarding the walls of Thebes, the two soldiers discuss the matter of the Sphinx and what it may be. They continue to their sighting of the Ghost of King Laius, when the Officer arrives. The Officer questions the two about the ghost sighting and leaves them to their duties. Tiresias and Jocasta enter and question the soldiers about the ghost sighting as well. As Jocasta begins to believe more and more, the ghost of King Laius appears. Despite his calls for his wife, he cannot be seen or heard by anyone else. After the cock crows in the dawn, Tiresias and Jocasta exit. After the two leave stage, the ghost of King Laius becomes audible and visible to the two soldiers. Laius struggles, apparently against the gods, to warn the soldiers about Oedipus's and Jocasta's impending doom, but disappears just as he is about to deliver the warning.

=== Act II: The Sphinx ===
The Voice is telling us what is about to happen in Act II concurrently with the events in Act I. The Sphinx, disguised as a beautiful girl, and Anubis sit in the outskirts of Thebes arguing about whether they have heard the first or second trumpet call, signalling that the gates of the city have been closed. The Sphinx declares she no longer wants to kill, but Anubis cautions that they must remain obedient to the gods. A mother and her two children cross the Sphinx's path while Anubis hides. The Sphinx and the unwitting mother discuss the situation in Thebes due to the Sphinx, and how some believe the Sphinx is a fabricated tale to act as a scapegoat for the problems in the city. It is revealed that the mother had another son whom the Sphinx killed. As the mother and her children exit, the second trumpet sounds. Anubis says the Sphinx must stay until the third trumpet blast. At this point, Oedipus enters, while Anubis hides again. The Sphinx and Oedipus discuss the Sphinx and Oedipus' journey thus far. The Sphinx reveals herself to Oedipus, and before asking him the riddle tells him the answer. The Sphinx officially asks Oedipus the riddle, to which he correctly replies, resulting in the death of the Sphinx. As proof of his victory, Oedipus takes the fused head of Anubis and the body of the Sphinx to Thebes to claim his reward.

=== Act III: The Wedding Night ===
The Voice tells us that Oedipus and Jocasta have been married and are now alone in their bridal chamber. Both Oedipus and Jocasta are exhausted from the day of wedding ceremonies. Before it is consummated, Tiresias comes to tell Oedipus he is apprehensive about the marriage. Oedipus is affronted and takes Tiresias by the throat. He peers into the High Priest's eyes and sees his future with Jocasta being healthy and content. Before he sees any further, he is temporarily blinded, presumably by the gods. Oedipus regains his sight, apologizes to Tiresias and reveals that he is the only son of Polybus and Merope of Corinth. Jocasta enters after Tiresias's exit, and the couple discuss the night Jocasta investigated the ghost of King Laius. Oedipus has a nightmare of Anubis attacking him in his sleep, and Jocasta soothes him in an ironically maternal fashion.

=== Act IV: The King ===
A messenger from Corinth brings Oedipus news that his father, King Polybus, has died, and his mother Queen Merope is too senile to understand. As well, the messenger tells Oedipus that he was adopted, while Oedipus reveals he killed a man in a carriage many years past. After hearing that Oedipus was adopted, Jocasta exits, while Oedipus processes the new information. When he leaves to talk to his wife, he finds Jocasta having committed suicide. It is revealed that Oedipus is the son of Laius and Jocasta. Antigone enters and says that her mother is dead and that her father has stabbed his eyes. Oedipus sees the ghost of Jocasta, who leads Oedipus offstage.

== Departure from Sophocles ==
The New York Times referred to The Infernal Machine as having taken "characters familiar from Greek tragedy off their pedestals and wittily humanized them while remaining true to Sophocles's plot. Oedipus, instead of a tragic hero, is a cocky, virginal youth whose arrogance is matched by his colossal naïveté. The relationship of Oedipus and Jocasta is treated as an extended Freudian joke. A vain, insecure woman obsessed with age, Jocasta has an eye for handsome young men, while Oedipus is drawn to older women who will cradle him like a child."

== Connection to Hamlet ==
In a Modern Drama article, "The Infernal Machine, Hamlet, and Ernest Jones", Alberta E. Feynman claims that while writing, Cocteau not only referred to the original text of Sophocles, but to William Shakespeare's Hamlet. Feynman holds, "In constructing this new version, Cocteau drew chiefly, but not solely, upon the original myth. He fused the myth of Oedipus with that of another great tragic hero—Hamlet." Several parallels exist between the two plays, including each play opening on the walls of a city, plus striking similarities between the character of Tiresias and Polonius. According to Hamlet and Oedipus by Ernest Jones, both "Cocteau and Shakespeare... depict protagonists driven by the mechanism of the Oedipus complex."
