= High School for Health Professions and Human Services =

Public school in New York City

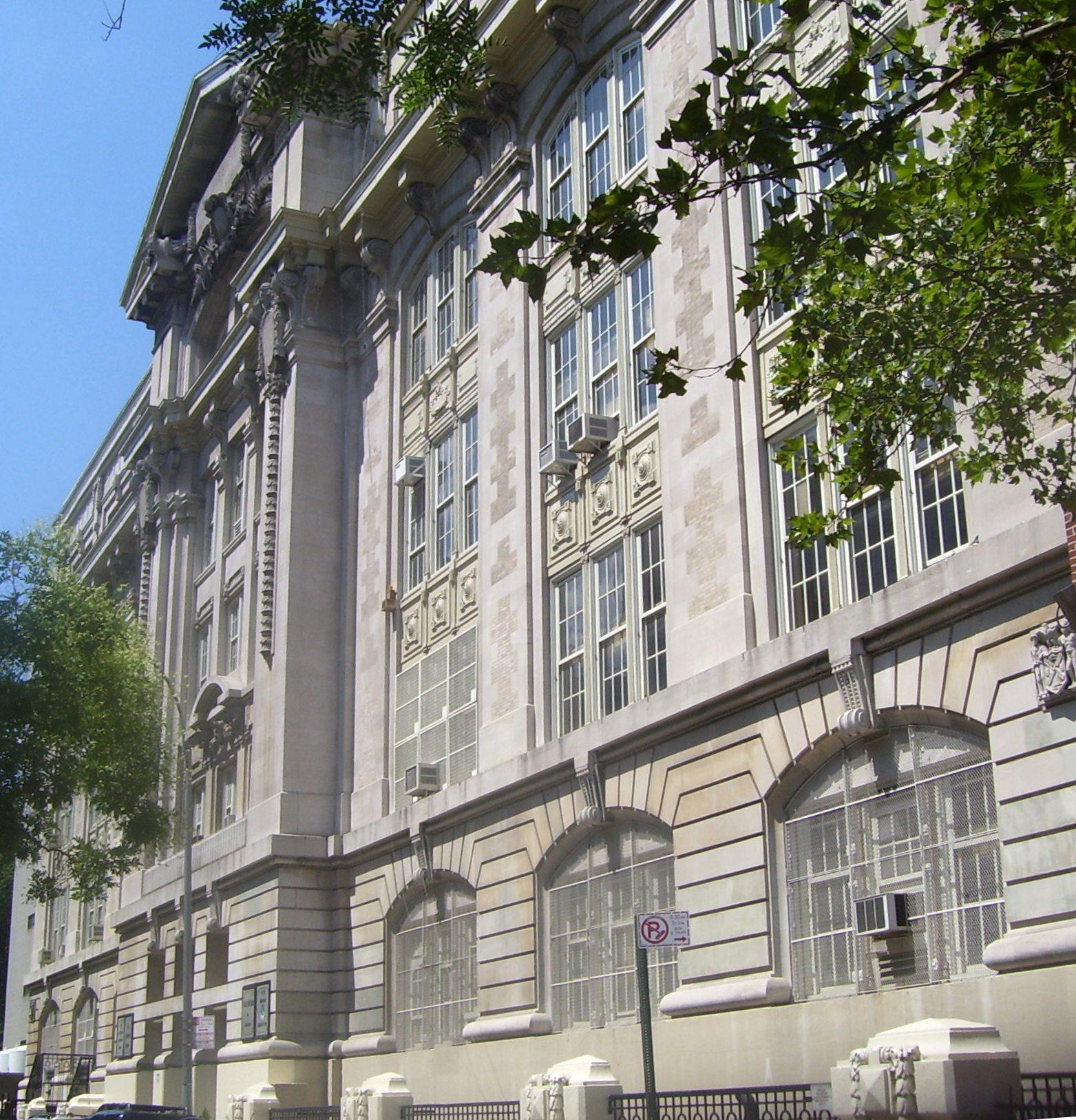
- The HPHS is located in the Old Stuyvesant Campus on 15th Street in Stuyvesant Town.

Address
- 345 East 15th Street, Manhattan, NY; Manhattan, New York; United States of America
- Coordinates: 40.7325°N 73.9827°W

The High School for Health Professions and Human Services is a public high school in Manhattan, New York City. It is specialized for students preparing for careers in the healthcare and human resources fields.

The curriculum emphasizes the academic preparation necessary for these fields. Students take four years of both mathematics and science, and there are elective research programs and college level courses in both the sciences and the humanities. The High School for Health Professions and Human Services offers a range of science courses as part of a traditional high school curriculum. Top students may conduct research with mentors at nearby hospitals and a few may even compete in the Intel Science Talent Search. The school also offers courses in nutrition, forensics, and a combined art and anatomy class.

== School life ==
Housed in the old Stuyvesant High School building, Health Professions can be very crowded at times. Starting times are staggered from 7:20 to 9 a.m. to accommodate triple sessions. Seniors may leave as early as noon; other grades stay until 3:10 p.m, depending on class periods. Physical education classes such as gym have about 50 students. The attendance and graduation rates are higher than the citywide average, and kids say they feel safe. There are no metal detectors and the bathrooms are unlocked. The school is about 70% female.

Two other schools are housed in the building at 345 East 15th Street. PS 226, a school for students with moderate to severe developmental disabilities, the Institute for Collaborative Education (ICE), an alternative school housed on the fifth floor of the building.

=== Academics ===
There is a wide range of academic abilities. About 125 of the strongest students are enrolled in the science research program. Beginning in 10th grade, they learn how to conduct experiments and work with mentors in addition to taking their regular chemistry or physics classes. Other students are assigned to the medical assisting, forensics or anatomy and physiology courses in which they may study topics like nutrition, forensics and basic principles of human anatomy and physiology. The three-year Medical Assisting course culminates in a NY State licensing exam; students who pass this exam are offered a license of Medical Assistant; Science Research students can earn college credits from Syracuse University based on work completed in the three-year long Science Research Program. Additionally, students may receive additional tuition to remedy weakness in a specific field of study. The medical science and research program, with about 125 seats, gives preference to students with good attendance records who scored Level 3 or 4 on standardized tests and who earned at least 85 in core academic subjects. Students are admitted to the medical technology program according to the educational option formula designed to provide a mix of low-average and high-achieving students.

Students are placed in Living Environment/Biology in the ninth grade, then are enrolled in either Chemistry or Physics in the 10th grade to complete their science requirements ending it with either Advanced Placement Biology, Chemistry or Physics in their junior and senior years. There are additional advanced placement courses in Mathematics (Calculus), US History, and Government.

=== Students ===
The school was founded as an educational option school, so out of all applicants to 9th and 10th grade, 50% are chosen directly by the school, and 50% are selected at random. Many graduates attend CUNY and SUNY institutes. HPHS has a large number of students by the diversity of race or color, comprising their student body. A college counselor from the non-profit organization, Comprehensive Development Inc., has begun working with students to encourage them to consider attending colleges out of state. Nearly 70% of graduates enrolled in either a 2-year or a 4-year college, according to the school's 2011 Progress Report. The school has many programs including CDI and college-associated programs such as LPP (Liberty Partnership Program) with Pace University.

=== Athletics ===
The school has PSAL or Public School Athletics League team which is called the Vipers. There are soccer, volleyball, cross country running, athletics, softball, basketball and JV Basketball teams. The Cross Country team has won two PSAL Cross Country League. There are clubs such as Writing Club, Reading Club, Chick Physique Club, Weight Training, etc. There exists a weight room where students are trained to have flexible muscle and build body to stay healthy and flexible. Some students even have the weight room as their gym class. The faculty motivates their students to join sports or a club to advance in education and in physical health.

== Recognition ==
The school was recognized as one of the best high schools by U.S. News & World Report in 2014.

== Notable alumni ==
- Adrienne Bailon- member of 3LW and co-host of The Real.
