= Rebecca Williams (actress) =

Canadian actress and corporate manager

- Born: Rebecca Jane Williams; July 28, 1988 (age 37); Liverpool, United Kingdom
- Occupation: • Actress • corporate manager
- Years active: 2001–2011

Rebecca Jane Williams (born July 28, 1988) is a Canadian corporate manager and former actress. A native of Liverpool, England, she immigrated to Canada at age four, attended Toronto's Malvern Collegiate Institute, and trained at Armstrong Acting Studios. In 2011, Williams was nominated for a Gemini Award (Best Performance by an Actress in a Leading Role in a Dramatic Program or Mini-Series) for Reviving Ophelia. Since 2013, she has been employed as an office manager for an energy service company in Calgary, Alberta.

== Filmography ==
Year	Film/Series	Role	Notes
2001	Blue Murder	Elanie Dewson	Episode: "Family Man"
2006	Life with Derek	Debbie	Episode: "Date with Derek"
2006	72 Hours: True Crime	Amanda Schneeberger	Episode: "Good Doctor"
2007	Jump In!	Tammy Lewis	
2007	The Gathering	Tonee Marston	
2009	Murdoch Mysteries	Miss Binscarth	Episode: "Shades of Grey"
2009	Being Erica	Sari	Episode: "Battle Royale"
2009	Degrassi: The Next Generation	Larissa	Episode: "Beat It: Part 1 & 2"
2010	Reviving Ophelia	Elizabeth Jones	
2010	The Night Before the Night Before Christmas	Hannah Fox	
2011	Rookie Blue	Kate Novatski	Episode: "Butterflies"
2011	Something Red		Short Film

== Awards and nominations ==
Year	Award	Category	Title of work	Result
2011	Gemini Award	Best Performance by an Actress in a Leading Role in a Dramatic Program or Mini-Series	Reviving Ophelia	Nominated
