= Josef Rudolf Lewy =

Josef Rudolf Lewy (2 April 1802 – 19 February 1881) was a French-born horn player, and composer of music for the horn. During his career he lived in Stuttgart, Vienna and Dresden.

== Life ==
He was born in Nancy, France, the younger brother of Eduard Constantin Lewy, who also became a horn player. Their father was a cellist in the ducal court of Zweibrücken. Josef had early musical training from his brother and, like his brother, he entered the Paris Conservatoire, where he studied the horn with Frédéric Nicolas Duvernoy.

Around 1818, his brother secured Josef a position as a viola and horn player in the orchestra in Basel. Recommended by Peter Josef von Lindpaintner in 1819, he became a horn player in the Court Orchestra of Stuttgart. In 1826 he moved to Vienna, where he joined his brother in the orchestra of the Court Theatre.

In the 1830s he made concert tours in Germany, France, England, Sweden and Russia. From 1837 he played in the Court Orchestra of Dresden; he returned to Vienna in 1851, where he was director of the horn school at the Vienna Conservatory. He retired in 1858 to Oberlößnitz, near Dresden, where he died in 1881.

He composed works for horn and piano, including a set of twelve studies.
