= Reviving Ophelia =

1994 non-fiction book by Mary Pipher

- Author: Mary Pipher
- Subject: Adolescence
- Published: 1994
- ISBN: 978-0-345-39282-4
- OCLC: 670317168

Reviving Ophelia: Saving the Selves of Adolescent Girls is a 1994 book written by Mary Pipher. This book examines the effects of societal pressures on American adolescent girls, and utilizes many case studies from the author's experience as a therapist. The book has been described as a "call to arms" and highlights the increased levels of sexism and violence that affect young women. Pipher asserts that whilst the feminist movement has aided adult women to become empowered, teenagers have been neglected and require intensive support due to their undeveloped maturity.

A television film of the same name, featuring Nick Thurston and Rebecca Williams, aired on the Lifetime network.

Reviving Ophelia 25th Anniversary Edition: Saving the Selves of Adolescent Girls is a revised and updated book co-written with Dr. Pipher's daughter Sara Gilliam.

== Summary and case studies ==
Reviving Ophelia is divided into sections by theme.

=== Introduction ===
This section introduces Pipher's theory that a great, and often negative, change influences girls during adolescence.

- Cayenne (15): The case study summarizes Cayenne's transition from an athletic, confident child into a self-conscious adolescent who, at fifteen years of age, contracted herpes.
- Charlotte (15): The daughter of divorced parents, Charlotte is in a relationship with a twenty-two-year-old boyfriend and has participated in underage drinking.
- Lori (12): From a family considered stable, Lori is presented as a well-adjusted girl, in contrast to other case studies contained in the book.

=== Families ===
This section analyzes the role of families in the development of adolescent girls.

- Francesca (14): A Lakota girl adopted by Caucasian parents and searching for a cultural identity.
- Lucy (15): In order to recover from leukemia, Lucy has deferred to her doctors' and parents' decisions. Following recovery, Lucy sought to rediscover her personal identity.
- Leah (18) and Jody (16): Two girls from a disciplinarian home, whom Pipher considers successful but lacking in individuality.
- Abby and Elizabeth: Two sisters raised in a more liberal household who seem to struggle through adolescence. Abby graduated from high school with difficulty and Elizabeth was pregnant during her junior year of high school.
- Rosemary (14): Raised in a liberal household that encouraged individuality, Rosemary became rebellious and self-conscious during adolescence.

Pipher claims that women who rejected conformity during adolescence are the ones who end up finding a protected space in adulthood. Through it they could "develop their uniqueness" (266).

=== Mothers ===
This section focuses specifically on mother-daughter relationships during adolescence.

- Jessica (15) and her mother, Brenda: Jessica's mother has been worried about her daughter's truancy. Pipher encourages Jessica to form goals and individualize herself.
- Sorrel (16) and her mother, Fay: When Sorrel "came out" to her mother as a lesbian, Fay made an appointment with Pipher and Sorrel to check that Sorrel has been adjusting appropriately.
- Whitney (16) and mother, Evelyn: Whitney initiated the request for therapy. The relationship between mother and daughter was strained, as Evelyn disapproved of Whitney being sexually active with her boyfriend. Whitney also feels that Evelyn "resented" her relationship with her father.

=== Fathers ===
This section focuses on relationships between fathers and their adolescent daughters.

- Katie (16) and her father, Pete: Kate was the main caretaker of her father, who was a single parent with muscular dystrophy. The pair were close; however, Peter feared that Katie was losing her adolescence taking care of her sick father.
- Holly (14) and her father, Dale: Holly and Dale had a distant relationship. Dale was a single father and Holly was an adolescent obsessed with Prince. The two came to therapy because Holly had attempted suicide after her boyfriend, Lyle, broke up with her. Pipher encouraged them to develop their father-daughter relationship.
- Klara (15) and her father, Kurt: Kurt expected his daughter to conform to a feminine ideal, as did Klara's boyfriend, Phil. Pipher encouraged Klara and Kurt to work through the emotions they shared regarding the loss of Klara's mother to cancer.

=== Divorce ===
The section of the book focuses on the effect that the parents' divorce can have on their adolescent daughters.

- Julia (14): She was a member of a blended family and came in to see Pipher after Julia's arrest for being a minor in possession of alcohol. Pipher encouraged Julia to deal with the stress of her mother's remarriage without the use of alcohol.
- Myra (14): Myra lived with her mother, Lois, who had divorced Myra's father after having an affair. Myra resented her mother for the divorce, but her father was not capable of taking care of her. When Myra lashed out physically at Lois, the mother decided to go to therapy with Myra.
- Amy (12): Amy was the subject of a custody battle as her parents divorced. Pipher encouraged the parents to let Amy stay with her grandparents while they finalized the terms of the divorce.
- Jasmin (13): Her parents were going through an amicable divorce and wanted to minimize any negative impacts the divorce would have on their daughter.

=== Depression ===
This section analyzes the onset of depression during the adolescence of girls.

- Monica (15): She became depressed due to bullying at school about her weight. Pipher encouraged Monica to join clubs, begin to exercise in a healthy way and find a way to adjust to adolescence while maintaining her "true self".
- Cindy (14): Cindy "wasn't growing physically, socially, emotionally or intellectually." After her parents' neglect, she responded positively to the attention she got during the therapy sessions.
- Penelope (15): She was a daughter of wealthy parents. She had overdosed on pills after her parents refused to buy her a car. Penelope agreed to meet with Pipher; however, following her session, Penelope again attempted suicide. She did not return to therapy with Pipher.

=== Self-mutilation ===
This section focuses on cases where, in their depression, adolescent girls turned to self-harm.

- Tammy (17): She came to therapy after her mother discovered her cutting her breasts with a razor. Tammy had begun cutting as a result of her abusive relationship with her boyfriend. Pipher encouraged Tammy's parents to explore their daughter's relationship with her boyfriend and continued to work with Tammy one-on-one.
- Gail (15): She had a habit of burning herself with cigarettes, due to feeling helpless and angry about social issues including HIV and the rape of women in Bosnia. Pipher encouraged Gail to volunteer in her community, and subsequently Gail stopped self-harming.

=== Eating disorders ===
This section focuses on eating disorders and the issues they arise from, including the expectation of beauty for American women.

- Heidi (16): Heidi was a bulimic gymnast. Her eating disorder arose from pressures to stay thin for gymnastics and for appearance. She came to therapy because her binging and purging had been interfering with her relationships with her boyfriend and her family.
- Prudence (16): She was plump and bulimic. Her brother, Greg, had died three years prior in a car crash. Pipher encouraged Prudence to use her brother's memory as a way to motivate herself during her recovery from bulimia.
- Samantha (16): She was an anorexic who prided herself on her thinness and self-discipline. Pipher worked with Samantha to get her to realize that her anorexia was a problem instead of a virtue.
- Violet (18): She was living in a homeless shelter after leaving foster care. Violet was a compulsive eater. Food provided her comfort in her foster homes and her fat felt like a defense mechanism against men who would be sexually interested in her. She met with Pipher for a while, but left for California after a few months.

=== Drugs and alcohol ===
This section focuses on the culture of substance abuse and its effect of adolescent girls.

- Tracy (13): She was expelled from school for having alcohol in her backpack, and her parents had discovered cigarettes in her dresser. Pipher encouraged the parents to give Tracy more privacy and encouraged Tracy to channel her energy into non-chemical activities.
- Rita (16): She came in after being arrested for drunk driving. She had grown up with an alcoholic father and wanted to avoid alcoholism herself. She was dating a 19-year-old alcoholic boy. Pipher encouraged Rita to look for and create healthy relationships.
- Casey (18): Casey's parents brought her in to see Pipher after the discovery of diet pills substantiated her parents' suspicion that Casey was using drugs. Casey told Pipher that she had started drinking so that she could have sex with boys with the goal of winning their approval. Pipher encouraged Casey to take control of her sexuality.
- Kelli (15): She came into therapy after her parents found marijuana in her bedroom. Kelli also admitted to Pipher that she had used LSD and hallucinogenic mushrooms. Pipher encouraged Kelli to explore non-chemical ways to alter her consciousness.

=== Sex ===
This section focuses on the effect of sex and gender roles on the lives of adolescent girls.

- Christy (14): She was the child of Catholic parents. She expressed frustration at the pressures that she felt to have sex.
- Lizzie (17): She had been experiencing trouble at school because she had cheated on her boyfriend while at summer camp. Pipher helped Lizzie work through the situation emotionally and gradually things improved for Lizzie at school.
- Angela (16): Her family disowned her after she became pregnant. The baby's father, Todd, did not help her with the pregnancy or the baby. Pipher helped Angela define what she wanted in a relationship.

=== Sexual violence ===
This section focuses on the effect of sexual violence on the lives of adolescent girls and their families.

- Ellie (15): Three men had raped Ellie after following her out of a bowling alley. Pipher helped Ellie and her family cope emotionally with this event.
- Terra (15): She was involved in an abusive relationship with her boyfriend, and had also been sexually abused by her step-grandfather as a young child. Pipher asked Terra to view her current abusive relationship in connection to the sexual abuse she suffered as a child.

=== What I've learned from listening ===
This section summarizes Pipher's case studies and conclusions she has drawn from her professional experiences.

== Critical and public reception ==
Reviving Ophelia was first published in 1994 and was well received by the public, evidenced by a three-year stretch on The New York Times Best Seller list, including a period in the top rank. The book also received positive reviews.

However, studies, such as The Gender Similarities Hypothesis, challenge the assertion that the self-esteem of girls is more significantly reduced at the beginning of adolescence than for boys.

== Related works ==
The Lifetime movie Reviving Ophelia is based on the book. The film, which was produced by Muse Entertainment and shot in Toronto, received two Canadian Gemini Award nominations: Best Performance by an Actress in a Leading Role in a Dramatic Program or Mini-Series (Rebecca Williams) and Best Writing in a Dramatic Program or Mini-Series (Teena Booth). It has also received a nomination for the Humanitas Prize (Teena Booth).

Reviving Ophelia has influenced other works, including Surviving Ophelia by Cheryl Dellasega, Ophelia's Mom by Nina Shandler and Ophelia Speaks: Adolescent Girls Write About Their Search for Self.

A story arc in the 2023 film Barbie was inspired by Reviving Ophelia.
