= Mary Pipher =

American clinical psychologist and author

- Born: October 21, 1947 (age 79)
- Other name: Mary Bray Pipher
- Education: University of California, Berkeley (BA); University of Nebraska–Lincoln (PhD)
- Occupations: Psychologist and author
- Known for: Reviving Ophelia

Mary Elizabeth Pipher (born October 21, 1947), also known as Mary Bray Pipher, is an American clinical psychologist and author. Her books include A Life in Light: Meditations on Impermanence (2022) and Women Rowing North (2019), a book on aging gracefully. Prior to that, she wrote The Green Boat: Reviving Ourselves in Our Capsized Culture (2013) and the bestseller Reviving Ophelia: Saving the Selves of Adolescent Girls (1994).

Pipher received a Bachelor of Arts degree in anthropology from the University of California, Berkeley in 1969 and a PhD in clinical psychology from the University of Nebraska–Lincoln in 1977. She was a Rockefeller Scholar in Residence at Bellagio in 2001. She received two American Psychological Association Presidential Citations. She returned the one she received in 2006 as a protest against the APA's acknowledgment that some of its members participate in controversial interrogation techniques at Guantánamo Bay and at US "black sites".

Pipher participates actively in Nebraska state legislature and voices her opinion through letters to the editor of the Lincoln Journal Star. She wrote an essay for The New York Times about the difficulty of Nebraska's mixed political views and need for more progressive politicians. She strongly opposes the Keystone XL Pipeline and supported the Nebraska Legislative Bill 802, the purpose of which was to create a state task force to combat climate change, calling it "an opportunity to educate and work through problems relating to climate change."

As of 2019 she resides in Lincoln, Nebraska.

== Reviving Ophelia ==
Pipher is best known for a book she wrote in 1994, introducing the terms Ophelia complex or Ophelia syndrome, in Reviving Ophelia. There she argued for a view of Shakespeare's character of Ophelia in Hamlet as lacking inner direction and externally defined by men, and suggested that similar external pressures were currently faced by post-pubescent girls. The danger of the Ophelia syndrome was that of abandoning a rooted childhood self, for an apparently more sophisticated but over-externalized façade self.

Reviving Ophelia 25th Anniversary Edition: Saving the Selves of Adolescent Girls is a revised and updated book co-written with Dr. Pipher's daughter, Sara Gilliam.

== Selected works ==
- Another Country: Navigating the Emotional Terrain of Our Elders
- Letters to a Young Therapist
- The Middle of Everywhere: The World's Refugees Come to our Town
- Reviving Ophelia: Saving the Selves of Adolescent Girls (1994, 2019) New York Times best seller for over three years
- The Shelter of Each Other: Rebuilding Our Families to Enrich Our Lives (1997) New York Times best seller
- Writing to Change the World (2006)
- Seeking Peace: Chronicles of the Worst Buddhist in the World (2009)
- The Green Boat: Reviving Ourselves in our Capsized Culture (2013)
- Women Rowing North: Navigating Life’s Currents and Flourishing As We Age (2019)
- A Life in Light: Meditations on Impermanence (2022)
