= Eduard Constantin Lewy =

French horn player (1796–1846)

Eduard Constantin Lewy (3 March 1796 – 3 June 1846) was a French-born horn player. He lived in Vienna, Austria, for most of his career.

== Life ==
Lewy was born in Saint-Avold, in the Moselle department of France. He had early musical training from his father, who was a cellist in the ducal court of Zweibrücken. Aged 14 he entered the Paris Conservatoire, where he studied the horn with Frédéric Nicolas Duvernoy. He also played violin and cello, and played in string quartets. From 1812 to 1815 he served in the French military, and became a regimental bandmaster and trumpet major. He made concert tours of France and Switzerland; he settled in Basel and from about 1817 played horn in the orchestra there. During this period in Basel he married Johanna Weiler.

In 1822 he moved to Vienna, appointed by Conradin Kreutzer, at that time the conductor at the Court Theatre, to be horn player in the theatre orchestra. In 1824 at the Court Theatre, as first horn, he took part in the premiere of Beethoven's Symphony No. 9. From about this time he was also a private teacher in Vienna; from 1829 he taught at the Vienna Conservatory. In 1846 he became a member of the Wiener Hofmusikkapelle, but is thought to have been a substitute there from 1835.

From 1826 he gave concerts in Vienna with his brother Josef Rudolf Lewy, also a horn player. and from 1836 gave very well-received concerts in Vienna with his children: Melanie, a harpist, Karl, a pianist, and Richard, a horn player. In 1838 he and his children made a successful tour of Germany and Russia.
