= Ophelia Speaks =

1999 English-language anthology

- Author: Sara Shandler; Emily Carmichael (essays)
- Language: English
- Genre: Anthology
- Published: 1999
- Publisher: HarperCollins
- Publication place: United States

Ophelia Speaks: Adolescent Girls Write About Their Search for Self is a 1999 book written by Sara Shandler and published by HarperCollins.

The book is an anthology of works by adolescent girls which spent eighteen weeks on The New York Times Best Seller List. Salon's review singled out "Fight Girl Power" by Emily Carmichael as the best of the collection, praising the essay as a "sophisticated, painful, and amusing meditation on girl power."

An unofficial sequel to the book was published in 2001, Ophelia's Mom written by Sara Shandler's mother, Nina Shandler, Sara Shandler wrote the foreword to Ophelia Speaks.
