= Robert Ira Lewy =

American doctor (born 1943)

Robert Ira Lewy (born October 16, 1943 - February 18, 2020) was an American doctor who has conducted research on aspirin therapy in heart disease and safety in recipients of silicone breast implants. During the 1990s, he was one of several doctors who played an active role in litigation against breast implant manufacturers.

== Career ==
Lewy earned a degree in biology from Franklin and Marshall College in 1964, where he was selected to be a member of the Phi Beta Kappa honor society as a senior. He then earned a medical degree from the University of Pennsylvania in 1970. He practiced clinical hematology and oncology in Houston, Texas from 1979 until 2005, except for a brief period working for the Cancer Treatment Centers of America in Tulsa. During this time he was Clinical Assistant Professor of Medicine at the University of Texas Health Science Center and the Baylor College of Medicine in Houston. Lewy was accepted as a Fellow of the American College of Physicians in 1983.

Lewy has published papers on the alleged health effects of silicone breast implants

During the 1990s, Lewy had a "lucrative practice" acting as an expert witness in litigation against breast implant litigation as well as treating women with silicon-breast implants. Seeing a large volume of patients - many of whom were referred to him by lawyers - Lewy was one of several doctors named in a New York Times article in which some medical experts criticized the "assembly-line practices" of a few doctors as being "intended more to help women collect vast court awards than to treat medical problems". In the same article patients said they were satisfied with and grateful for the treatment they received from Lewy and other doctors, and Lewy stated that he and other doctors "have taken on large patient loads because many other doctors are ignoring the health problems of women with implants".

The most recent review November 9, 2015 from Brown University in which Dr Lewy participated (reference 89)concluded that the 20 year experiment had failed to prove the absolute safety of silicone gel breast implants and further studies were needed (Rohrbach et Balk below).

== Charitable activities ==
Since retiring in 2005, Lewy has made several large philanthropic gifts. In 2006, he donated over $1 million to Stuyvesant High School, his high school alma mater for the establishment of the Dr. Robert Ira Lewy Multimedia Center, to serve as the high school's central academic research facility. He established a proprietary family genealogy archive at the Leo Baeck Institute. In 2019 he donated $350,000 to The Leo Baeck Institut, the Gift by naming LBI’s reference services as the Dr. Robert Ira Lewy Reference Service (the “Naming”), to be announced on June 12, 2019. In late 2013, Lewy made a bequest of $800,000 to New York University to establish the Dr Robert Ira Lewy Permanent Endowment in German Jewish History and Culture at the Skirball Department of Hebrew and Judaic Studies. He is a member of the Legacy Society of the Multiple Myeloma Research Foundation. <In 2019 he donated $300,000 to the New York Zen Center for Contemplative Care www.zencare.org<\>

== Selected publications ==
- with Saia, John; Silver, Melvin J.; Smith, J. Bryan; Walinsky, Paul; Wiener, Leslie (April 1979). "Detection of thromboxane B2 in peripheral blood of patients with Prinzmetal's angina". Prostaglandines and Medicine. 2 (4): 243–8. doi:10.1016/0161-4630(79)90059-4. PMID 575861.
- — (1980). "Effect of Elevated Plasma-Free Fatty Acids on Thromboxane Release in Patients with Coronary Artery Disease". Pathophysiology of Haemostasis and Thrombosis. 9 (3): 134–40. doi:10.1159/000214351. PMID 7372200.
- with Saia, J.; Silver, Melvin J.; Smith, J. Bryan; Walinsky, Paul; Wiener, Leslie (December 1979). "Comparison of Plasma Concentrations of Thromboxane B-2 and Prinzmetal's Variant Angina and Classical Angina Pectoris". Clinical Cardiology. 2 (6). John Wiley & Sons: 404–6. doi:10.1002/clc.4960020603. PMID 544110. S2CID 9763705.
- — (March 1994). "Autoimmune disease and collagen dermal implants". Annals of Internal Medicine. 120 (6). American College of Physicians: 525–6. doi:10.7326/0003-4819-120-6-199403150-00023. PMID 8311382. S2CID 2936186.
