= The Spectator (Stuyvesant High School) =

Newspaper in Stuyvesant High School, New York City

- Type: Biweekly student newspaper
- Format: Compact
- Owner: Independent
- Editor-in-chief: Stella Krajka and Evelyn Lifton
- Founded: 1915
- Headquarters: Stuyvesant High School in New York City
- Circulation: 4,500
- OCLC number: 48552566
- Website: stuyspec.com

The Spectator is a biweekly high school newspaper published by students of New York City's Stuyvesant High School. The paper, founded in 1915, is one of Stuyvesant's oldest publications. It has a long-standing connection with its older namesake, Columbia University's Columbia Daily Spectator, and it has been recognized by the Columbia University Graduate School of Journalism's Columbia Scholastic Press Association on several occasions. The Spectator's original reporting has been cited by The New York Times and the Associated Press.

== Organization ==
The Spectator contains 15 departments. They consist of News, Features, Opinions, Science, Arts & Entertainment, Games, Humor, and Sports, as well as the Art, Copy, Business, Layout, Photos, Video, and Web departments.

Departments are headed by editors who encompass the editorial board of the paper. The editorial board meets daily in The Spectator journalism class and is headed by the two Editors in Chief (EICs). At the start of their term, the EICs select three to four editors to be members of the Managing Board, a group that advises the EICs on matters relating to the paper.

The Spectator is a not-for-profit and is financially independent from the school, but remains a prime news source for students, teachers, and administrators. The Spectator distributes 3,000 copies to the Stuyvesant community and surrounding neighborhoods free of charge.

=== Staff ===
There are over 400 total staff members who help to produce the bi-weekly publication, including a faculty adviser. At the beginning of the fall and spring terms, there are recruitments, but interested students may join at any time. Recruitments usually include some type of application followed by a writing portion. These applications are read by the editors and reviewed by the editorial board before choices are made. New recruits are notified by email, and are trained respectively.

=== Editorial board ===
Each department is headed by one to four editors. The editors, as a group, are known as the editorial board and work on the paper daily in a class informally known as "Spec Class." Editors edit and compile the newspaper for its biweekly distribution. Before the current editors graduate, they choose Editors-in-Training (EiTs) to take their place. The EiTs are trained for up to a year before taking on the full role as an editor.

== History ==
The Spectator has been in continuous publication since 1915. As the "crown jewel" of Stuyvesant High School publications, it was launched on February 25, 1915, under Editor Joseph E. Kasper ’15. The first issue sold for two cents. In the early 1930s, The Spectator became free of charge to all students.

The paper won Columbia Scholastic Press Association Gold Medal and First Place awards throughout the 1950s and 1960s. In 1960, a Daily Mirror article charged that the principal censored several Spectator stories and revoked graduation awards for editors. The paper interviewed past President Harry Truman in 1957 and the Freedom Riders in 1962. A controversy ensued in the early 1960s when teachers disallowed the publication of an article about the firing of a teacher who had refused to participate in nuclear air-raid drills. In the 1970s, The Spectator supported anti-Vietnam demonstrations.

=== 1998 shutdown ===
In April 1998, Editor-in-Chief Micah Lasher, a future politician, published a wraparound spoof edition of The Spectator called "The Defectator," which poked fun at faculty members and the college advisor. Lasher's column called for the end of teacher employment practices based on seniority.

On April 9, the day before spring break, the assistant principal of technology changed the locks and all the computer passwords in the paper's windowless office. Principal Jinx Cozzi Perullo shut down The Spectator after mounting tensions between faculty, administration, and students. The New York Times reported that there were months of infighting between the editors themselves and their faculty advisor. The disputes were "inflamed by a handful of articles criticizing the conduct of individual teachers and the policies of the city teachers' union."

"The episode aroused considerable criticism outside the school, and the students turned it into a First Amendment cause. They eventually drew up a charter giving the newspaper more freedom than most administrators grant school newspapers. The charter was approved by a panel including outside officials and professional journalists."

Some students believe that the paper was shut down to appease angry faculty members and censor further editorials on UFT politics, teacher hiring practices, and faculty conduct. The day after the April Fools' issue, leaders of the teachers’ union complained about being bashed by the newspaper in a meeting with Principal Perullo. Perullo believed in students’ rights to write about things that involve their lives, including teachers, but wanted The Spectator to have a written set of guidelines. The Spectator staff drew up a charter with help from Columbia University’s School of Journalism. The charter defines the procedures for selecting the editor-in-chief and the roles of the editorial board, the managing board, and the faculty advisor.

Publication resumed on May 5, 1998 following a petition opposing the suspension said to be signed by half the school's students.

=== Charter ===
The outgoing EICs and editorial board select the new EICs. In addition, "student journalists, in concert with a faculty adviser, will make the final content decisions for The Spectator." The charter protects the paper against interference from the administration, specifically review by all school administrators except its faculty adviser, and allows The Spectator to print important and controversial material without struggling for an administrator's consent. It is the basis for The Spectator's independence. The charter resulted from "a highly publicized dispute over The Spectator's plan to publish a series of critical articles about the teachers' union and certain teachers."

=== Online version ===
In April 1999, Jack Rosenthal, president of the New York Times Foundation, met with Principal Stanley Teitel and the editors of The Spectator at Stuyvesant High School. He "had a vision that one day, one day, high school newspapers across the country, in both wealthy and poor districts, would be able to publish stories and pictures daily on the Internet." A team of Spectator editors, veteran journalists, and web journalism specialists worked together to create The Spectator Online, originally published alternatively every other week between versions of the print paper. With the help of Steven Knowlton, an associate professor of journalism at Hofstra University, and Karen Freeman, a Circuits editor for The New York Times and a former associate professor of journalism at Penn State University, The Spectator Online was launched in October 1999. The team also created a how-to website, with an online manual and free software, published by the Times. A journalism class was created by the Stuyvesant administration with funding from The New York Times. The website has won several CSPA Gold Circle Awards for Online Media.

The current version of the Spectator website can be found at stuyspec.com.

=== 9/11 issue ===
The 9/11 issue of The Spectator.

On October 2, 2001, The Spectator, under Editor-in-Chief Jeff Orlowski and Faculty Advisor Holly Ojalvo, created a special 24-page full-color 9/11 insert containing student photos, reflections and stories. On November 20, 2001, the magazine was distributed for free in 830,000 copies of The New York Times to the entire New York Greater Metropolitan Area.
