= Stuyvesant High School =

Specialized high school in New York City

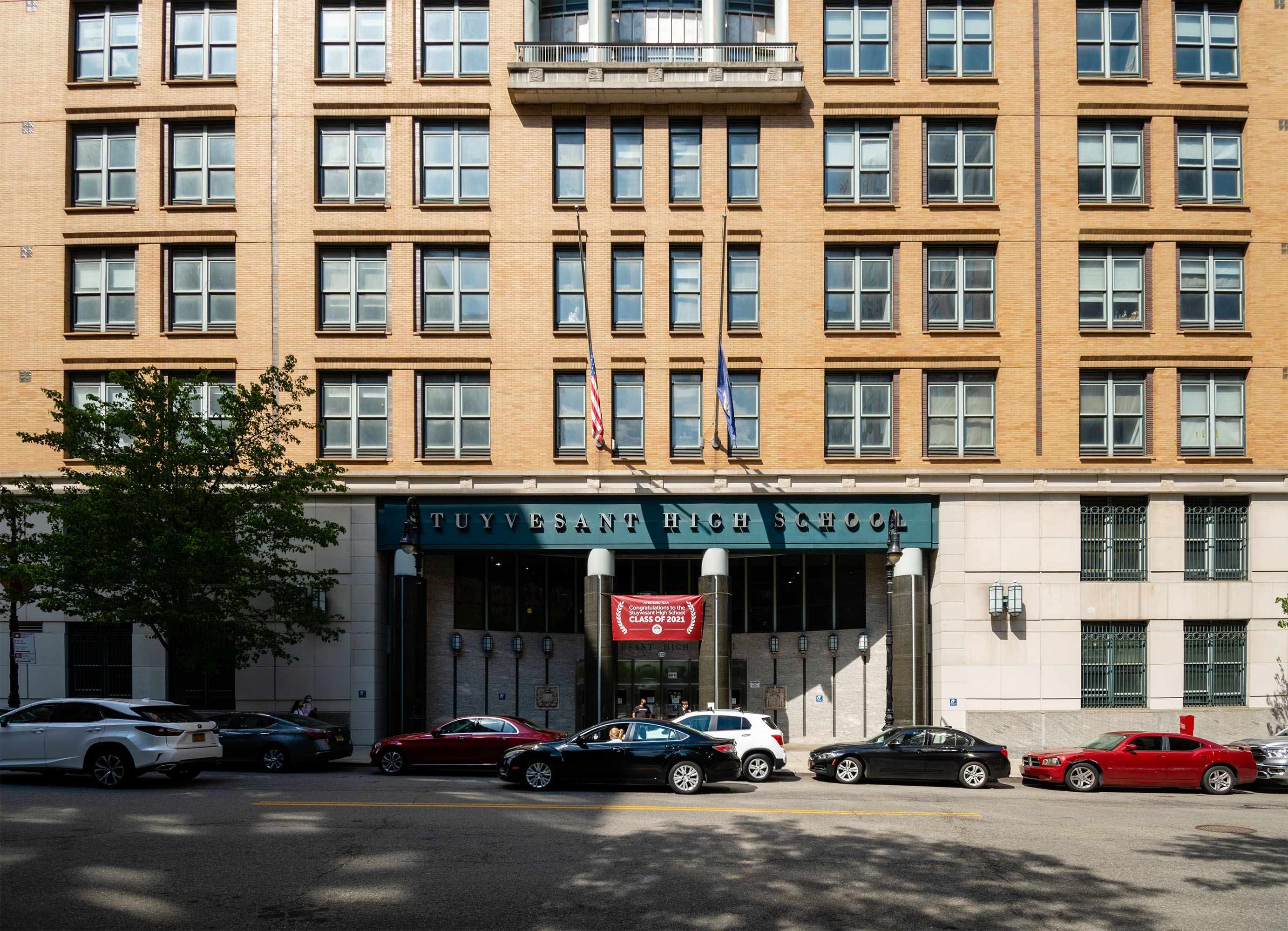

Location
- 345 Chambers Street; New York City, New York 10282; United States; 40.7179°N 74.0138°W

Information
- Type: selective; public
- Motto: Latin: Pro Scientia Atque Sapientia (For knowledge and wisdom)
- Established: 1904; 122 years ago
- School district: New York City Department of Education
- School number: M475
- CEEB code: 334070
- NCES School ID: 360007702877
- Principal: Seung Yu
- Faculty: 162.92 (on FTE basis)
- Grades: 9 to 12
- Gender: Co-ed
- Enrollment: 3,334 (2022–23)
- Student to teacher ratio: 20.46
- Athletics conference: PSAL
- Mascot: Pegleg Pete
- Nickname: Stuy
- Team name: Peglegs
- USNWR ranking: 26
- Newspaper: The Spectator
- Yearbook: The Indicator
- Nobel laureates: 4
- Website: stuy.enschool.org

Stuyvesant High School (Note: /ˈstaɪvəsənt/ STY-və-sənt, commonly called "Stuy" (/staɪ/ STY) by its students, faculty, and alumni.) is a public college-preparatory specialized high school in Manhattan, New York City, United States. The school specializes in developing talent in math, science, and technology. Operated by the New York City Department of Education, the school offers tuition-free, advanced classes to New York City high school students.

Stuyvesant High School was established in 1904 as an all-boys school in the East Village of Lower Manhattan. Starting in 1934, admission for all applicants was contingent on passing an entrance examination. In 1969, the school began permanently accepting female students. In 1992, Stuyvesant High School moved to its current location at Battery Park City to accommodate more students. The old campus houses several smaller high schools and charter schools.

Admission to Stuyvesant involves passing the Specialized High Schools Admissions Test, required for the New York City Public Schools system. Every March, approximately 800 to 850 applicants with the highest SHSAT scores are accepted out of about 30,000 students who apply to Stuyvesant, an acceptance rate of less than 3%.

Extracurricular activities at the school include a math team, a speech and debate team, a robotics team, a yearly theater competition, and various student publications, including a newspaper, a yearbook, and literary magazines. Stuyvesant has educated four Nobel laureates. Notable alumni include former United States attorney general Eric Holder, physicists Brian Greene and Lisa Randall, economists Robert Fogel, Jesse Shapiro, and Thomas Sowell, mathematician Paul Cohen, chemist Roald Hoffmann, biologist Eric Lander, Oscar-winning actor James Cagney, comedian Billy Eichner, and chess grandmaster Robert Hess.

== History ==
=== Planning ===
In 1887, the then independent city of Brooklyn's Superintendent of Schools, William Henry Maxwell, wrote a report about the need to construct technical and science-oriented secondary schools in Brooklyn and throughout New York state. This would follow other examples of specialized high schools, such as the Baltimore Manual Training School, now the Baltimore Polytechnic Institute. The municipal architect and engineer C. B. J. Snyder, who designed many of the city's public school buildings, had repeatedly mentioned a need for more basic mathematical and scientific preparation in New York's growing numbers of public secondary schools in the late 19th century. The first such school in the city was Manual Training High School in Brooklyn, which opened in 1893. By 1899, now positioned as the newly-formed City of Greater New York's Superintendent of Public Schools, Maxwell was advocating for another specialized high school across the river in the newly established borough of Manhattan.

In January 1903, Maxwell and Snyder submitted a report to the New York City Board of Education in which they suggested creating a school in Manhattan. The Board of Education approved the plans in April 1904. It suggested that the school occupy a plot on East 15th Street, west of First Avenue. But that plot did not yet contain a school building, and so the new school was initially housed within Public School #47's former building at 225 East 23rd Street. The Board of Education also wrote that the new school would be "designated as the Stuyvesant High School, as being reminiscent of the locality". Stuyvesant Square, Stuyvesant Street, and later Stuyvesant Town (which was built in 1947) are all near the proposed 15th Street school building. All these locations were named after Peter Stuyvesant, the last Dutch Director (governor) of New Netherland (and its major port town of New Amsterdam) and owner of the area's Stuyvesant Farm. The appellation of a specific historical name was selected to avoid confusion with Brooklyn's earlier Manual Training High School.

=== Opening and boys' school ===
Stuyvesant High School opened in September 1904 as Manhattan's first specialized high school. At the time of its opening, it had 155 students and 12 teachers.

At first, the school provided a core curriculum of "English, Latin, modern languages, history, mathematics, physics, chemistry, [and] music", as well as a physical education program and a more specialized track of "woodworking, metalworking, mechanical drawing, [and] freehand drawing". But in June 1908, Maxwell announced that the school's core curriculum would be separated for the rest and that a discrete trade school would operate in the Stuyvesant building in the evening. Thereafter, Stuyvesant became renowned for excellence in math and science. In 1909, eighty percent of the school's alumni went to college; other high schools sent only 25% to 50% of their graduates to college.

By 1919, officials were restricting admission based on academic achievement. Stuyvesant implemented a double session plan in 1919 to accommodate the rising number of students: some students would attend in the morning and others in the afternoon and early evening. All students studied a full set of courses. These double sessions ran until spring 1957. The school implemented a system of entrance examinations in 1934. The examination program, developed with the assistance of Columbia University, was expanded in 1938 to include the newly founded Bronx High School of Science.

=== Co-educational school ===
In 1967, Alice de Rivera sued the Board of Education, alleging that she had been banned from taking Stuyvesant's entrance exam because of her gender. The lawsuit was decided in her favor, and Stuyvesant was required to accept female students. The first female students were accepted in September 1969, when Stuyvesant offered admission to 14 girls and enrolled 12 of them. The next year, Stuyvesant accepted 223 female students. By 2015, girls were 43% of the student body.

In 1972, the New York State Legislature passed the Hecht–Calandra Act, which designated four citywide selective specialized public high schools in New York City—Stuyvesant, Brooklyn Technical High School, Bronx Science, and the High School of Music & Art (now Fiorello H. LaGuardia High School)—as specialized high schools of New York City. The act called for a uniform exam to be administered for admission to Brooklyn Tech, Bronx Science, and Stuyvesant. The exam, named the Specialized High Schools Admissions Test (SHSAT), tested the mathematical and verbal abilities of students who were applying to any of the specialized high schools. The only exception was for applicants to the music and arts program at LaGuardia High School, who were accepted by audition rather than examination.

==== September 11 attacks ====
The current school building in Battery Park City is about 0.5 miles (0.8 km) from the site of the World Trade Center, which was destroyed in the terrorist attacks on September 11, 2001. The school was evacuated during the attack. Although the smoke cloud from the World Trade Center temporarily covered the building, there was no structural damage, and there were no reports of physical injuries. Less than an hour after the collapse of the second World Trade Center tower, concern over a bomb threat at the school prompted an evacuation of the surrounding area, as reported live on the Today show. When classes resumed on September 21, 2001, students were moved to Brooklyn Technical High School while the Stuyvesant building served as a base of operations for rescue and recovery workers. This caused severe congestion at Brooklyn Tech, and required the students to attend in two shifts, with Stuyvesant students attending in the evening. Normal classes resumed on October 9.

A southward view of Stuyvesant High School from Hudson River Park, with the new World Trade Center in the distance

Nine alumni were killed in the World Trade Center attack. On October 2, 2001, the school newspaper, The Spectator, ran a 24-page section with student photos, reflections, and stories. On November 20, the magazine was distributed for free to the greater metropolitan area, enclosed within 830,000 copies of The New York Times. In the months after the attacks, Annie Thoms, an English teacher at Stuyvesant and the theater adviser at the time, suggested that the students take accounts of staff and students' reactions during and after September 11 and compile them into a collection of monologues. Thoms published these monologues as With Their Eyes: September 11—The View from a High School at Ground Zero.

==== Later history ====
During the 2003–04 school year, Stuyvesant celebrated the 100th anniversary of its founding with a full year of activities. Events included a procession from the 15th Street building to the Chambers Street one, a meeting of the National Consortium for Specialized Secondary Schools of Mathematics, Science and Technology, an all-class reunion, and visits and speeches from some notable alumni.

In the 21st century, keynote graduation speakers have included Attorney General Eric Holder (2001), United Nations Secretary General Kofi Annan (2004), and comedian Conan O'Brien (2006).

== Buildings ==
=== 15th Street building ===
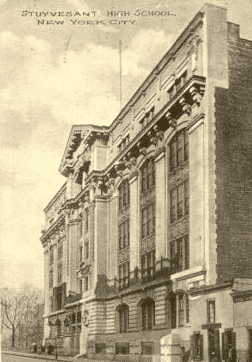
Postcard black and white art featuring the 15th Street old Stuyvesant High School building, of 1905–1907, now known since 1992 as the Old Stuyvesant Campus housing several smaller secondary and charter schools

In August 1904, the Board of Education authorized municipal architect and engineer Snyder to design a new facility for Stuyvesant High School at 15th Street. The new high school structure was designed in the then popular Beaux-Arts and Neoclassical / Classical Revival architecture for its grand imposing style. It was shaped like the letter "H", with two interior light courts; the shape also allowed natural light to illuminate more inside windows and parts of the building. The cornerstone for the new building was laid in September 1905. About $1.5 million was spent on constructing the school, including $600,000 for the monumental stone exterior alone. It was considered one of the most expensive public buildings or school structures ever built up to that time in New York, and was a point of civic pride in the early 20th century. In 1907, the Stuyvesant High School moved to the new building on 15th Street. The new building had a capacity of 2,600 students, more than double that of the existing previous temporary school building of the last few years at 23rd Street. It contained 25 classrooms devoted to skilled industrial trades such as joinery, as well as 53 regular classrooms and a 1,600-seat auditorium.

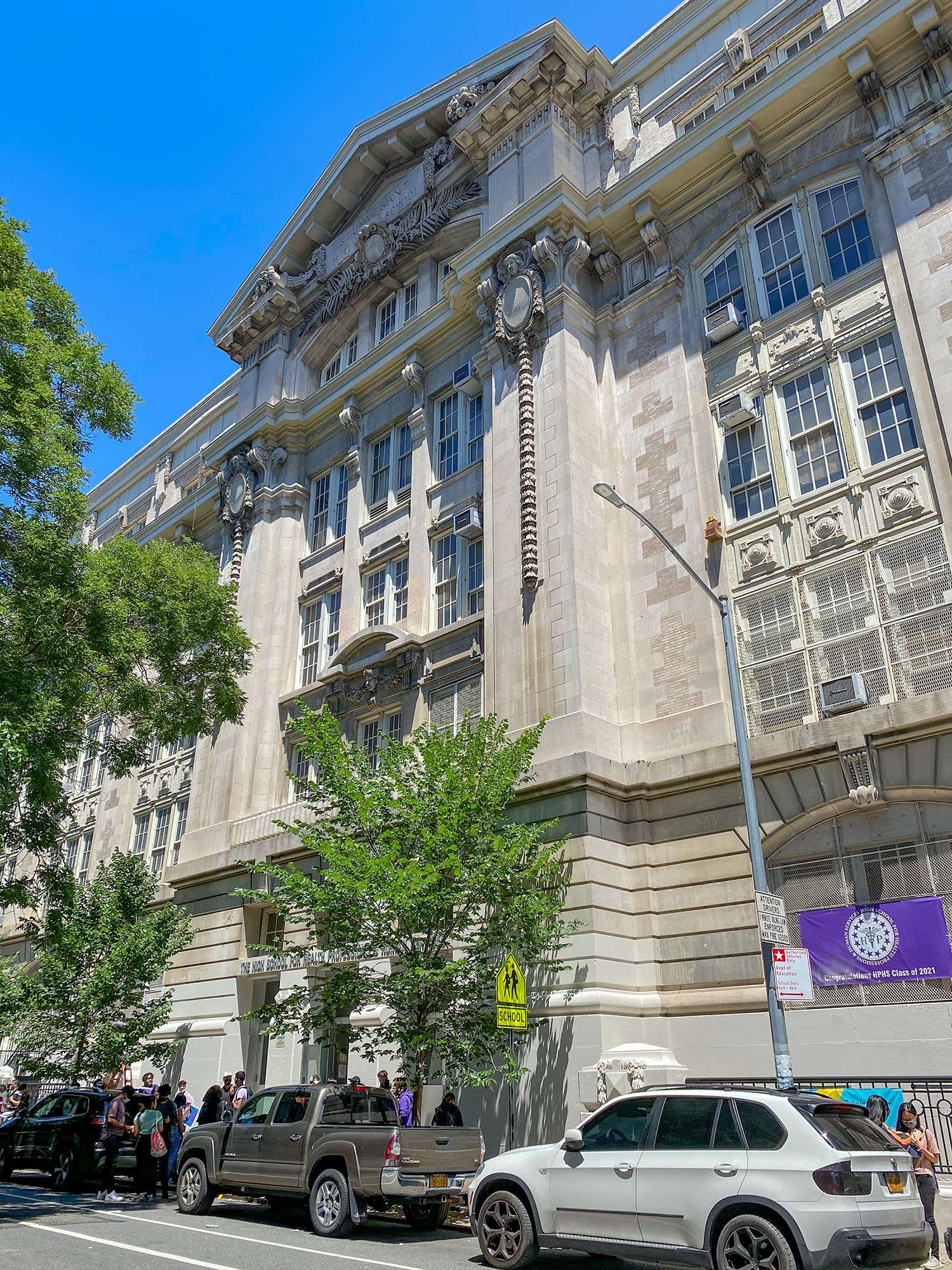
Modern color photograph of former Stuyvesant High School, 1907–1992, now renamed The Old Stuyvesant Campus on East 15th Street, as seen in 2021

A half-century later, during the 1950s, the building underwent a $2 million renovation to update its classrooms, shops, libraries, and cafeterias.

Unfortunately through the 1970s and 1980s, when New York City municipal government and especially the public schools system, in general, were marked by violence, vandalism / graffiti and low academic grades among their students, Stuyvesant High still had an excellent academic reputation for being a top-notch public high school, and was still graduating well-prepared alumni who became highly accomplished. But the 1905–1907 school building was deteriorating due to overuse and lack of proper maintenance. A New York Times daily newspaper exposé found that the building had "held out into old age with minimal maintenance and benign neglect until its peeling paint, creaking floorboards and antiquated laboratories became an embarrassment." The five-story building could not cater adequately to the several thousand students, leading the New York City Board of Education to move the school to a new building in Battery Park City, near lower Manhattan's Financial District. The 15th Street building remains in use as the "Old Stuyvesant Campus", housing three smaller schools: the Institute for Collaborative Education, the High School for Health Professions and Human Services, and lower grades of PS 226.

=== Current building ===
In 1987, Mayor Ed Koch and Governor Mario Cuomo announced the construction of a third new Stuyvesant High School building to be situated in Battery Park City. The Battery Park City Authority donated 1.5 acres (0.61 ha) of land for the building. The authority was not required to hire the lowest bidder, which meant the construction process could be accelerated in return for a higher cost. The building was designed by the architectural firms of Gruzen Samton Steinglass and Cooper, Robertson & Partners. The structure's main architect, Alex Cooper of Cooper, Robertson & Partners, had also designed much of the surrounding development of Battery Park City.

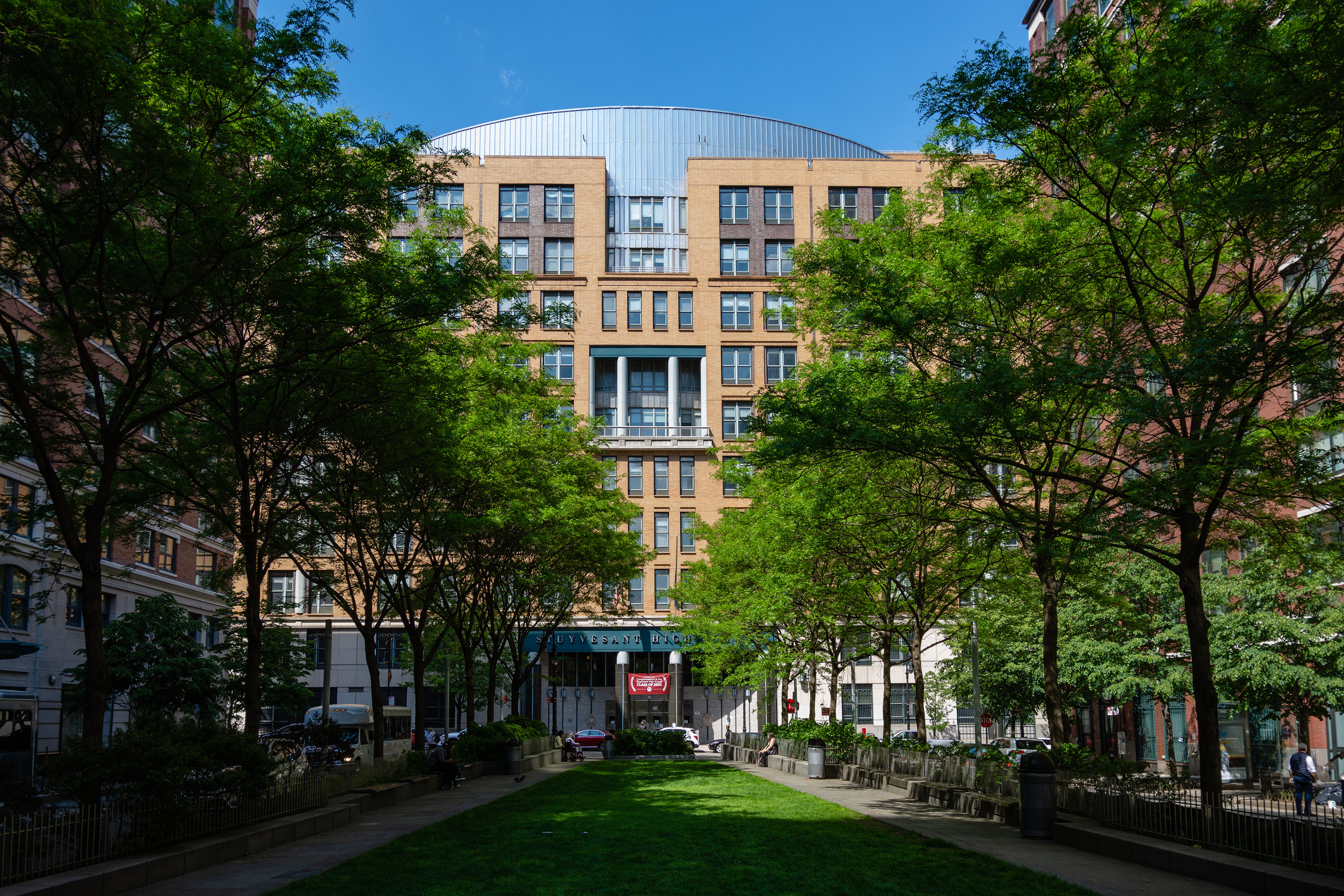
The facade as seen from Battery Park City

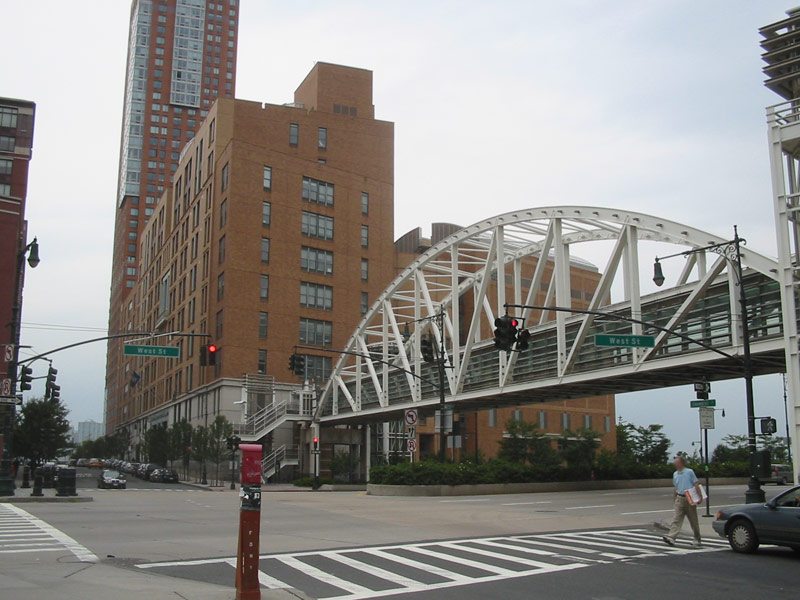
The new building (left) as seen from the corner of Chambers and West streets. The Tribeca Bridge (right) is used as one of the building's entrances.

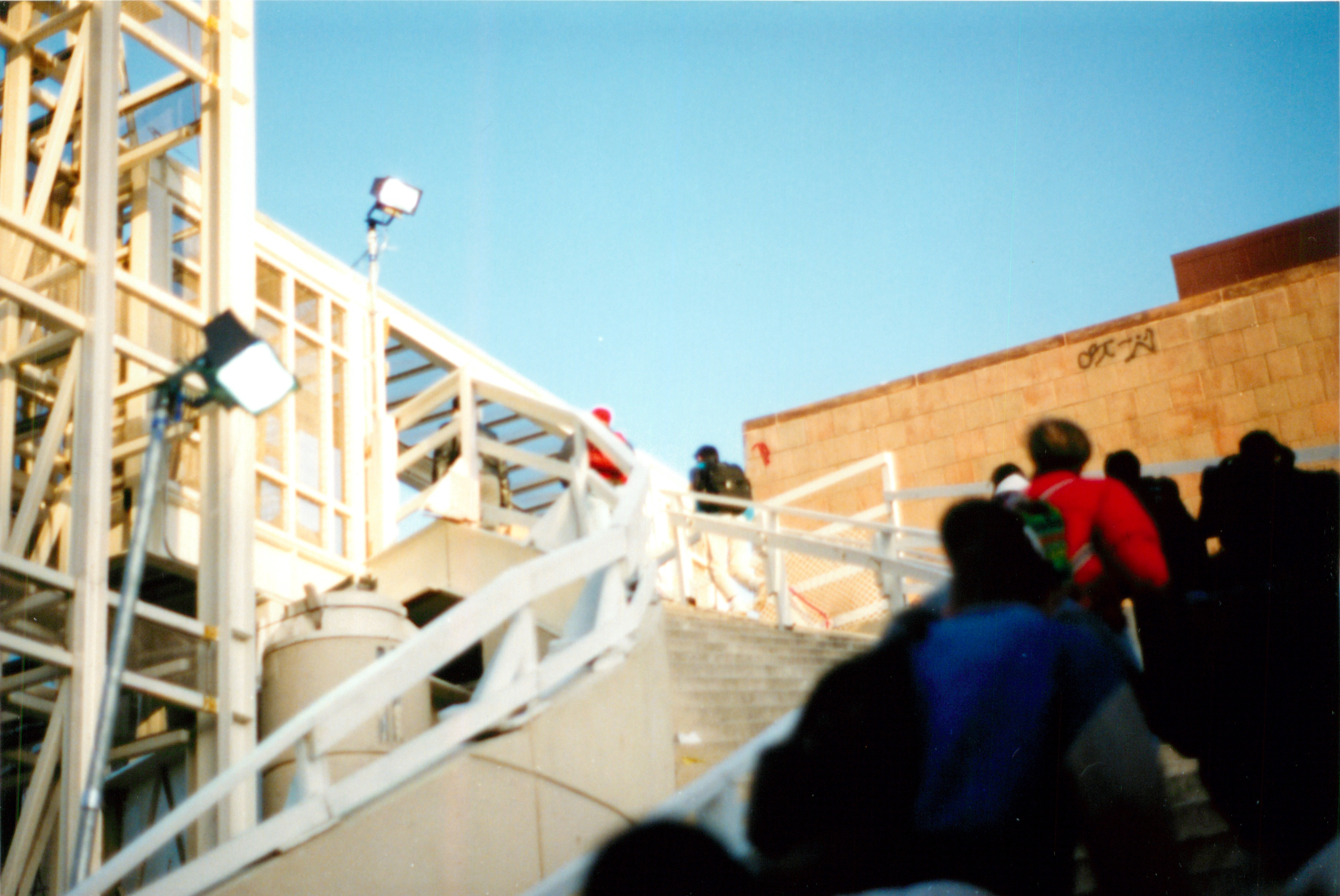
Students entering Stuyvesant High School using the Tribeca Bridge, soon after its opening

Stuyvesant's principal at the time, Abraham Baumel, visited the country's most advanced laboratories to gather ideas about what to include in the new Stuyvesant building's 12 laboratory rooms. The new 10-story building also included banks of escalators, glass-walled studios on the roof, and a shorter four-story northern wing with a swimming pool, five gymnasiums, and an auditorium. Construction began in 1989. When it opened in 1992, the building was New York City's first new high school building in ten years. The new downtown Stuyvesant Campus cost $150 million, making it the most expensive high school building ever built in the city at the time. The Stuyvesant library has a capacity of 40,000 volumes and overlooks Battery Park City.

Shortly after the building was completed, the $10 million Tribeca Bridge was built to allow students to enter it without having to cross the busy West Street. The building was designed to be fully compliant with the Americans with Disabilities Act and is listed as such by the New York City Department of Education. As a result, the building is one of the five additional sites of P721M, a school for students with multiple disabilities who are between the ages of 15 and 21.

In 1997, the eastern end of the mathematics floor was dedicated to Richard Rothenberg, the Stuyvesant mathematics department chairman who had died from a sudden heart attack earlier that year. Sculptor Madeleine Segall-Marx was commissioned to create the Rothenberg Memorial in his honor. She created a mathematics wall titled "Celebration", consisting of 50 wooden boxes—one for each year of his life—behind a glass wall, featuring mathematical concepts and reflections on Rothenberg.

In 2006, Robert Ira Lewy of the class of 1960 made a gift of $1 million to found the Dr. Robert Ira Lewy M.D. Multimedia Center. In 2007, he donated his personal library. In 2010, the high school's library merged with the New York Public Library (NYPL) network in a four-year pilot program, in which all students of the school received a Stuyvesant High School/NYPL student library card so they could check books out of the school library or any other public library in the NYPL system.

An escalator collapse at Stuyvesant on September 13, 2018, injured ten people, including eight students. As a result, various escalators remained closed off to students for examination and renovation for the next few years.

==== Mnemonics ====
During construction, the Battery Park City Authority, the Percent for Art Program of the City of New York, the Department of Cultural Affairs, and the New York City Board of Education commissioned Mnemonics, an artwork by public artists Kristin Jones and Andrew Ginzel. Four hundred hollow glass blocks were dispersed randomly from the basement to the tenth floor of the new Stuyvesant High School building. Each block contains relics providing evidence of geographical, historical, natural, cultural, and social worlds, from antiquity to the present time. The blocks are set into the hallway walls and scattered throughout the building. Each block is inscribed with a brief description of its contents or context. The items displayed include pieces of the 15th Street Stuyvesant building, fragments of monuments from around the world, memorabilia from each of the 88 years' history of the old building, a Revolutionary War button, water from the Nile and Ganges Rivers, fragments of the Mayan pyramids, and various chemical compounds. Empty blocks were also installed to be filled with items chosen by every graduating class through 2080. The installation received the Award for Excellence in Design from the Art Commission of the City of New York.

== Transportation ==
The New York City Subway's Chambers Street station, served by the 1, 2, and 3 trains, is nearby, as is the Chambers Street–World Trade Center station served by the A, C, and E trains. New York City Bus's M9, M20 and M22 routes stop near Stuyvesant. Students residing half a mile or farther from the school are given full-fare OMNY cards for public transportation at the start of each year. OMNY cards offer four free rides per day and can be used year-round.

== Enrollment ==
Student body composition as of 2024
Race and ethnicity	Total
Asian	71.3%
White	16.7%
Two or more Races	4.5%
Hispanic	4.1%
Black	2.2%
Native Hawaiian/Pacific Islander	0.7%
American Indian/Alaska Native	0.6%
Sex	Total
Male	55%
Female	45%
Income	Total
Economically disadvantaged	49%

=== Entrance examination ===
Stuyvesant has a total enrollment of over 3,000 students and is open to residents of New York City entering ninth or tenth grade. Enrollment is based solely on performance on the three-hour Specialized High Schools Admissions Test, which is administered annually. 25,678 students took the test in 2024. The list of schools using the SHSAT includes eight of New York's nine specialized high schools. The test score necessary for admission to Stuyvesant has consistently been higher than that needed for admission to the other schools using the test. Admission is based on the applicant's SHSAT score and their ranking of Stuyvesant among the other specialized schools. Ninth- and rising tenth–grade students are also eligible to take the test for enrollment, but far fewer students are admitted that way. The test covers math (word problems and computation) and verbal (reading comprehension) skills. Former Mayor John Lindsay and community activist group Association of Community Organizations for Reform Now (ACORN) have argued that the exam may be biased against African and Hispanic Americans, but attempts to eliminate the exam have been criticized as discriminatory against Asian Americans.

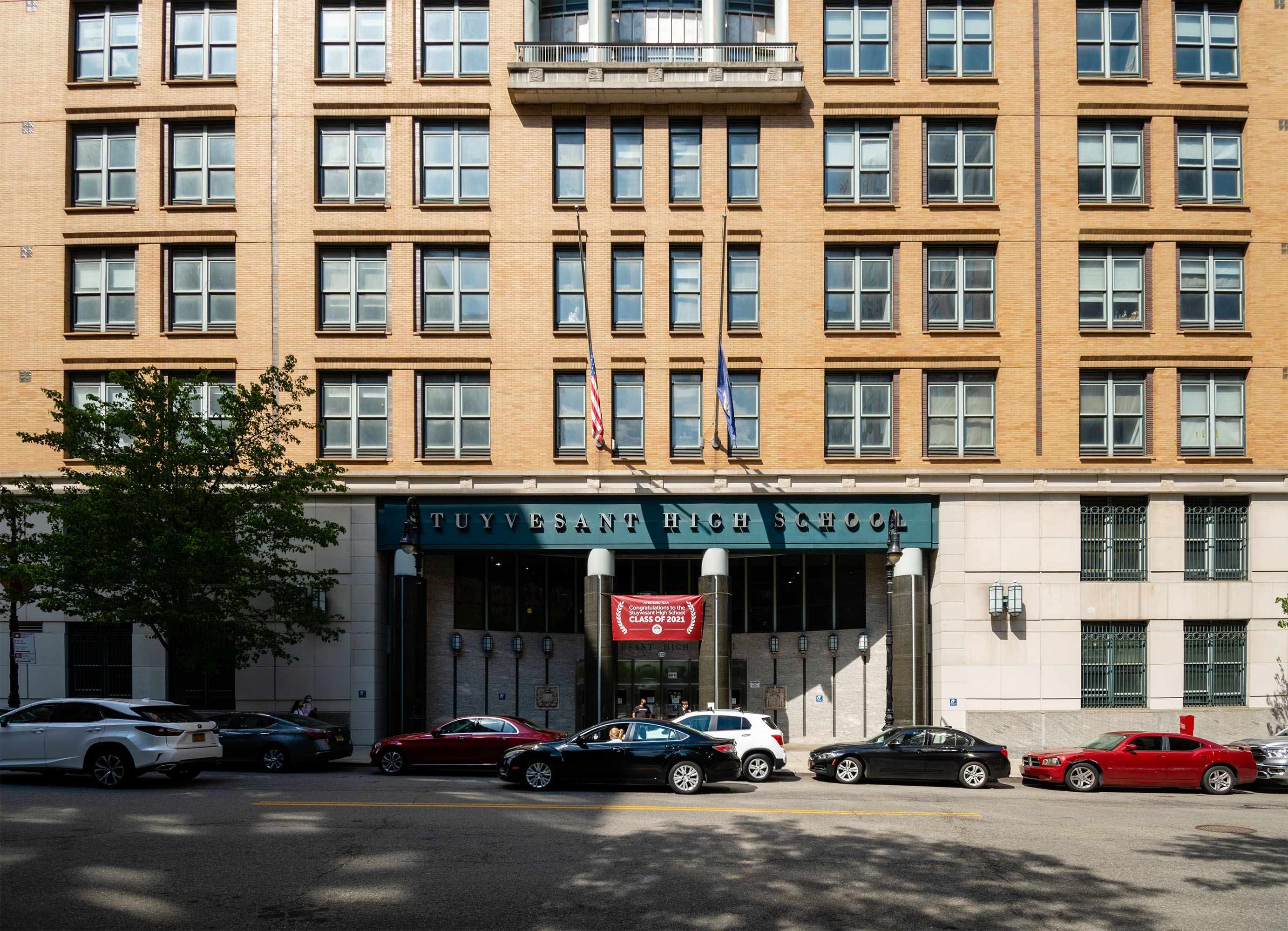
Main entrance to Stuyvesant High School third buildings / campus on Chambers Street in Battery Park City of lower Manhattan since 1992, with open two-stories ground level gap, as seen in 2021.

=== Demographics and SHSAT controversy ===
For most of the 20th century, the student body at Stuyvesant High was not only all-male (1904–1969), but also heavily Jewish. A significant influx of Asian students began in the 1970s; by 2019, 74% of the Stuyvesant students in attendance were Asian-American. In the 2024 academic year, the student body was 71% Asian, 16% Caucasian, 2% African American, 4% Hispanic, <1% Native American, <1% Pacific Islander and 6% other. The paucity of Black and Hispanic students at Stuyvesant High has often been an issue for city administrators. In 1971, Mayor Lindsay argued that the test was culturally biased against black and Hispanic students and sought to implement an affirmative action program. Protests by parents forced the plan to be scrapped and led to the passage of the Hecht-Calandra Act, which preserved admissions by examination only. A few students judged to be economically disadvantaged who came within a few points of the cutoff score were given an extra chance to take the test.

In 1996, community activist group ACORN International published two reports, Secret Apartheid and Secret Apartheid II. The reports call the SHSAT "permanently suspect" and a "product of an institutional racism", saying that black and Hispanic students did not have access to proper test preparation materials. Along with then New York Schools Chancellor Rudy Crew, ACORN began an initiative for more diversity in the city's gifted and specialized schools and demanded that the SHSAT be suspended altogether until the Board of Education could show all children had access to appropriate materials to prepare for it. Students published several editorials in response to ACORN's claims saying the school's admissions system was based on merit, not race.

Many students take preparatory courses offered by private tutorial companies such as The Princeton Review and Kaplan, Inc. to perform better on the SHSAT, often leaving those unable to afford such classes at a disadvantage. In 1995, the Board of Education started the Math Science Institute, a free program to prepare students for the SHSAT. Students attend preparatory classes through the program, now known as the Specialized High School Institute (or DREAM), at several city schools from the summer after sixth grade until the exam. But Black and Hispanic enrollment has continued to decline. After further expansion of free test prep programs, the proportion of black and Hispanic students still did not increase. As of 2019, fewer than 1% of freshman openings were given to black students, while over 66% were given to Asian-American students, most of whom had similar socioeconomic backgrounds to those of the black students.

In 2003, The New York City Department of Education reported that public per student spending at Stuyvesant High School is slightly lower than the city average. Stuyvesant also receives private contributions from alumni, retired faculty, charitable foundations, and educational grants to build up its endowment.

== Academics ==
Stuyvesant's college-preparatory curriculum includes four years of English, history, and laboratory-based sciences. The sciences courses include requisite biology, chemistry, and physics classes. Students also take four years of mathematics; three years of a single foreign language; a semester each of introductory art, music, health, and technical drawing; one semester of computer science; and two lab-based technology courses. Several exemptions from technology education exist for seniors. Stuyvesant offers a selection of elective courses, including astronomy, New York City history, Women's Voices, and Computer Graphics Design in the Computer Science Area. Most students complete the New York City Regents courses by junior year and take calculus during their senior year. The school offers math courses through differential equations for more advanced students. A year of technical drawing was formerly required; students learned how to draft by hand in its first semester and how to draft using a computer in the second. Now, students take a one-semester drafting course and a semester of introductory computer science. For the class of 2015, the one-semester computer science course was replaced by a two-semester course.

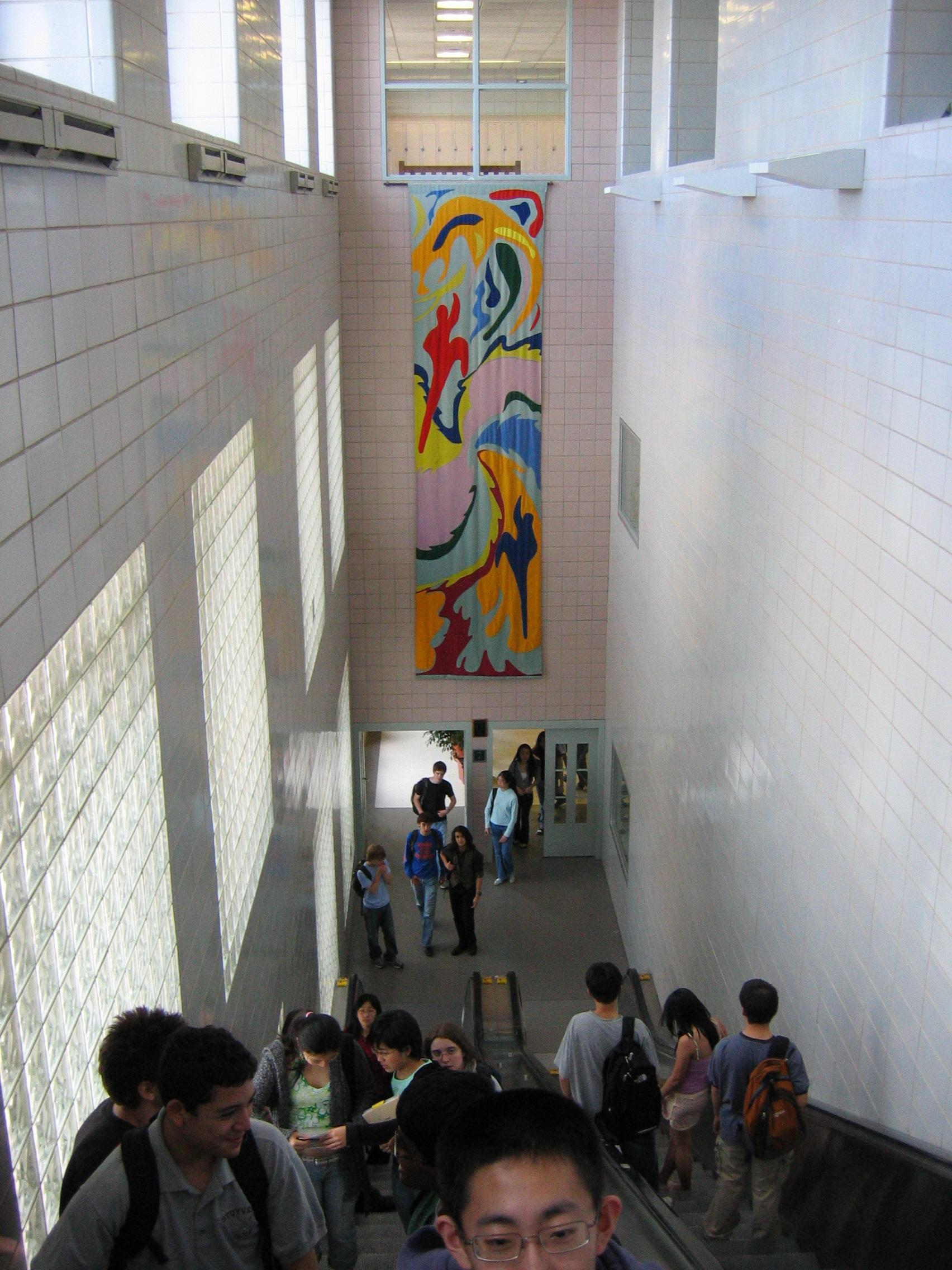
The escalators from the seventh to ninth floors. A Stuyvesant art class created the banner in the background.

As a specialized high school, Stuyvesant offers Advanced Placement (AP) courses in math, science, history, English, and foreign languages. This gives students opportunities to earn college credit and boost college admission chances. AP computer science students may also take three additional computer programming courses after completing the AP course: systems level programming, computer graphics, and software development. There is also a one-year computer networking class that can earn students Cisco Certified Network Associate (CCNA) certification.

Stuyvesant's foreign language offerings include Spanish, French, German, Latin, Mandarin, and Japanese. In 2005, the school also started offering courses in Arabic after the school's Muslim Student Association raised funds to support the course. Stuyvesant's biology and geo-science department offers courses in molecular biology, human physiology, medical ethics, medical and veterinary diagnosis, human disease, anthropology and sociobiology, vertebrate zoology, laboratory techniques, medical human genetics, botany, the molecular basis of cancer, nutrition science, and psychology. The chemistry and physics departments include classes in organic chemistry, physical chemistry, astronomy, engineering mechanics, and electronics.

The English Department offers students courses in British and classical literature, Shakespearean literature, science fiction, philosophy, existentialism, debate, acting, journalism, creative writing, and poetry. The Social Studies core requires two years of global history (or a year of global followed by a year of European history), a year of U.S. history, and a semester each of economics and government. Humanities electives include American foreign policy, civil and criminal law, prejudice and persecution, and race, ethnicity and gender issues.

In 2004, Stuyvesant High entered into an agreement with the City College of New York (C.C.N.Y. – part of the larger City University of New York) whereby the college funds advanced after-school courses taken for college credit but taught by Stuyvesant faculty. These include linear algebra, advanced Euclidean geometry, and women's history.

Before the 2005 revision of the SAT (Scholastic Aptitude Test), Stuyvesant graduates had an average score of 1408 out of 1600 (685 in the verbal section of the test, 723 in the math section). In 2010, Stuyvesant students' average SAT score was 2087 out of 2400, while the class of 2013 averaged 2096. As of 2023, Stuyvesant students' average SAT score was 1510 out of 1600 points. Stuyvesant also administers more Advanced Placement exams than any other high school in the world and has the highest proportion of students who reach the AP courses' "mastery level". As of 2018, there are 31 AP classes, with a little more than half of all students taking at least one. About 98% of students pass their AP tests.

== Extracurricular activities ==
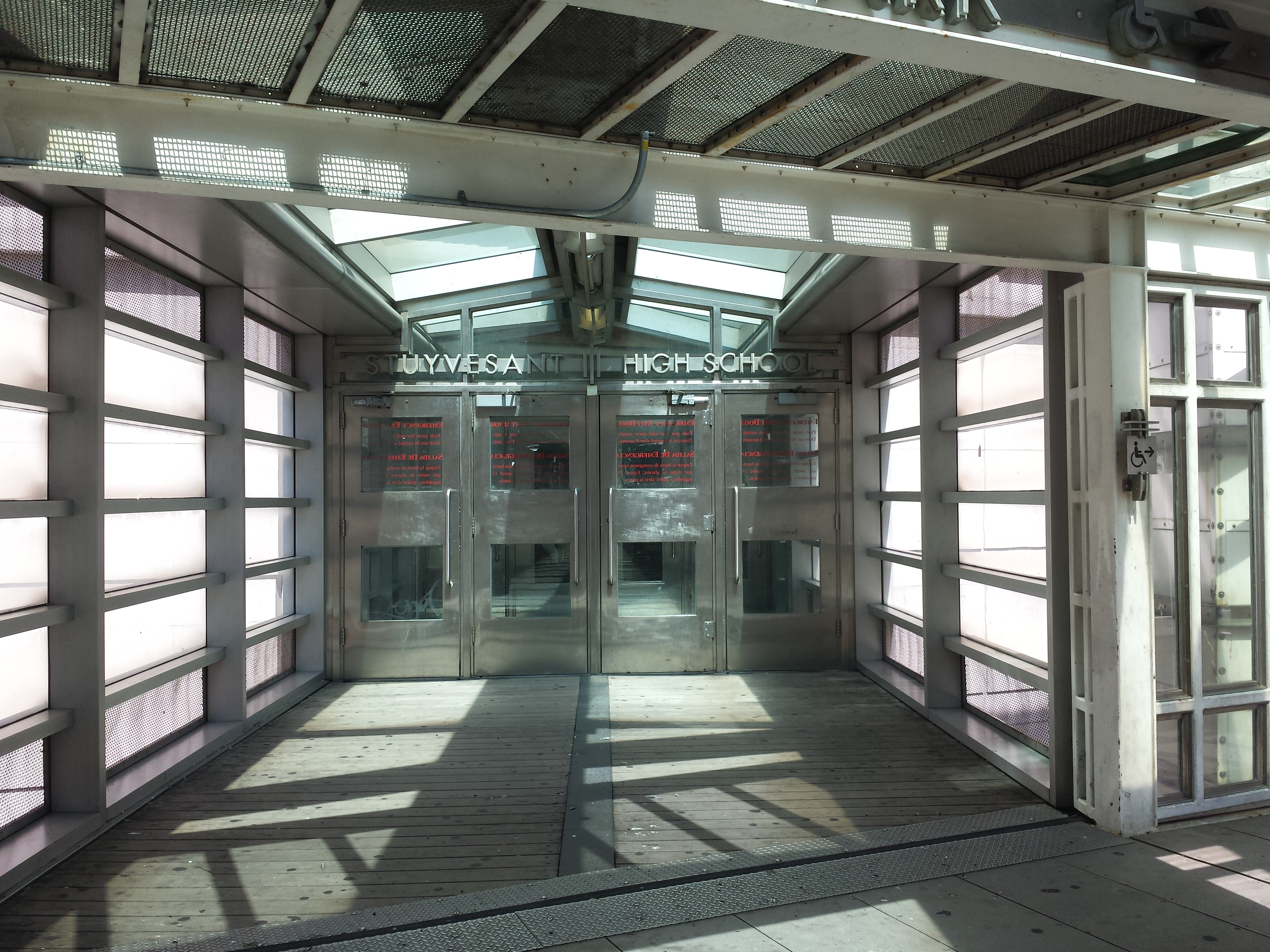
Entrance from the Tribeca Bridge

=== Sports ===
Stuyvesant fields 32 athletics varsity teams, including the swimming, golf, bowling, volleyball, soccer, basketball, gymnastics, wrestling, fencing, baseball/softball, American handball, tennis, track/cross country, cricket, football, and lacrosse teams. In addition, Stuyvesant has ultimate teams for the boys' varsity, boys' junior varsity, and girls' varsity divisions.

15 years after moving to Chambers Street in Battery Park City, in September 2007, the Stuyvesant High football team was given a home field at Pier 40, on the Hudson River waterfront of the westside of Manhattan situated north of the school at Houston Street and West Street. In 2008, the baseball team was granted use of the pier after construction and delivery of an artificial turf pitching mound that met Public Schools Athletic League specifications. Stuyvesant also has its own swimming pool, but it does not contain its own running track or tennis court.

=== Student government ===
The student body of Stuyvesant High School is represented by the Stuyvesant Student Union, a student government. It comprises a group of students (elected each year for each grade) who promote and manage extracurricular activities (clubs and publications), by organizing out-of-school activity such as city excursions or fundraisers, and provide a voice to the student body in all discussion of school policy with the administration.

=== Clubs and publications ===
Stuyvesant allows students to join clubs, publications, and teams under a system similar to that of many colleges. As of 2015, the school had 150 student clubs.

==== The Spectator ====
The Spectator is Stuyvesant's official in-school newspaper, which is published biweekly and is independent from the school administration and faculty. There are over 250 students who help with its publication. At the beginning of the fall and spring terms, there are recruitments, but interested students may join at any time.

Founded in 1915 (and now 109 years old), The Spectator is one of Stuyvesant's oldest publications. It has a long-standing connection with its older namesake; the Columbia University's Columbia Daily Spectator, and has been recognized by the Columbia University Graduate School of Journalism's well-known nation-wide Columbia Scholastic Press Association. founded 1925.

==== The Voice ====
The Voice, May 1977

The Voice was founded in the 1973–1974 academic year as an independent publication only loosely sanctioned by school officials. It had the appearance of a magazine and gained a large readership. The Voice attracted a considerable amount of controversy and a First Amendment Constitutional lawsuit, after which the administration forced it to go off-campus and to turn commercial in 1975–1976.

At the beginning of the 1975–1976 academic year, The Voice decided to publish the results of a confidential random survey. The administration refused to permit The Voice to distribute the questionnaire, and the Board of Education refused to intervene. The then editor-in-chief of The Voice, brought a First Amendment challenge to this decision to the United States District Court for the Southern District of New York in front of Judge Constance Baker Motley.

Relying on the 1969 U.S. Supreme Court holding in Tinker v. Des Moines Independent Community School District that "undifferentiated fear or apprehension of disturbance is not enough to overcome the right to freedom of expression", Motley ordered the New York City Board of Education to permit the distribution of the survey to the juniors and seniors. However, Judge Motley's ruling was overturned on appeal to the United States Court of Appeals for the Second Circuit. There Judge J. Edward Lumbard, joined by Judge Murray Gurfein and over dissent by third Judge Walter R. Mansfield, held that the distribution of the questionnaires was properly disallowed by the administration. The higher level U.S. Supreme Court denied certiorari review.

=== SING! ===
SING V program, 1977

The annual theater competition known as SING! pits seniors, juniors, and "soph-frosh" (sophomores and freshmen working together) against each other in a contest to put on the best performance. SING! started in 1947 at Midwood High School in Brooklyn and has expanded to many New York City high schools since then. SING! at Stuyvesant started as a small event in 1973, and since then, has grown to a school-wide event; in 2005, nearly 1,000 students participated. The entire production is written, directed, produced, and funded by students. Their involvement ranges from being members of the production's casts, choruses, or costume and tech crews to Step, Hip-Hop, Swing, Modern, Bolly, Flow, Tap or Latin dance groups. SING! begins in late January to February and ends in final performances on three nights in March/April. Scoring is done on each night's performances and the winner is determined by the overall total.

== Reputation ==
The Stuyvesant High School has produced many notable alumni, including four Nobel laureates. As of 2024, U.S. News & World Report magazine ranked Stuyvesant as 2nd among New York City high schools and 21st among STEM high schools in the country. In December 2007, The Wall Street Journal studied the freshman classes at eight selective colleges in the U.S. and reported that Stuyvesant sent 67 students to these schools, comprising 9.9% of its 674 seniors. In recent years, Stuyvesant High’s student newspaper has reported on college admissions of the graduating classes, with the class of 2021 having 133 students offered admission to Ivy League institutions.

U.S. News & World Report included Stuyvesant on its list of "Best High Schools" published in December 2009, ranking 31st. In its 2010 progress report, the New York City Department of Education assigned Stuyvesant an "A", the highest possible grade.

Stuyvesant has had the second highest number of National Merit Scholarship semi-finalists, behind Thomas Jefferson High School for Science and Technology in Alexandria, Virginia. From 2002 to 2010, Stuyvesant has produced 103 semi-finalists and 13 finalists on the Intel Science Talent Search, the second most of any secondary school in the United States behind the Bronx High School of Science. In 2014, Stuyvesant had 11 semi-finalists for the Intel Search, the highest number of any school in the U.S.

In the 2010s, exam schools, including Stuyvesant, have been the subject of studies questioning their academic effectiveness. A study by the Massachusetts Institute of Technology (Cambridge, Massachusetts) and Duke University (Durham, North Carolina) economists compared high school outcomes for Stuyvesant students who barely passed the SHSAT score required for admission, to those of applicants just below that score, using the latter as a natural control group of peers who attended other schools. The study found no discernible average difference in the two groups' later performance on New York state exams.

== Notable people ==
Notable scientists among Stuyvesant alumni include mathematicians Bertram Kostant (1945) and Paul Cohen (1950), physicists Brian Greene (1980) and Lisa Randall (1980), and genomic researcher Eric Lander (1974).

Other prominent alumni include civil rights leader Bob Moses (1952), MAD Magazine editor Nick Meglin (1953), BitTorrent protocol creator Bram Cohen (1993), and entertainers such as songwriter and Steely Dan founder Walter Becker (1967), Thelonious Monk (1935), rapper Heems (1985), actors Lucy Liu (1968), Tim Robbins (1976), and James Cagney (1918), comedian Paul Reiser (1973), playwright Arthur M. Jolly (1987), sports anchor Mike Greenberg (1985), Columbia University, early NBA, and minor league pro basketball player and bookmaker Jack Molinas (1949), and foil fencer and Olympic Games medalist Albert Axelrod.

In business, government, and politics, former United States Attorney General Eric Holder is a Stuyvesant alumnus (1969), as are 2008 presidential election campaign manager for Barack Obama and later senior advisor to Obama's presidential administration David Axelrod (1972) and former adviser to President Bill Clinton Dick Morris (1964). Former New York City Council member Eva Moskowitz (1982) also graduated from the high school.

Pulitzer Prize-winning author Frank McCourt was a Stuyvesant faculty member and taught English at Stuyvesant before the publication of his memoirs Angela's Ashes, 'Tis, and Teacher Man. Teacher Man's third section, titled Coming Alive in Room 205, concerns McCourt's time at Stuyvesant, and mentions a number of students and fellow faculty.

Russian and former Soviet Union journalist and propagandist Vladimir Pozner Jr., known in the West for his numerous appearances during the 1980s and 1990s on the ABC News late-evening program Nightline, was also a Stuyvesant alumnus. Economist Thomas Sowell also attended Stuyvesant, but dropped out early at age 17 because of financial difficulties and problems in his home.

Four Nobel laureates are Stuyvesant alumni:

- Joshua Lederberg (1941) – Nobel Prize in Physiology or Medicine, 1958
- Robert Fogel (1944) – Nobel Memorial Prize in Economic Sciences, 1993
- Roald Hoffmann (1954) – Nobel Prize in Chemistry, 1981
- Richard Axel (1963) – Nobel Prize in Physiology or Medicine, 2004

== See also ==
- Education in New York City
- Health effects arising from the September 11 attacks
- List of New York City Designated Landmarks in Manhattan from 14th to 59th Streets
- History of New York City
