= Ophelia complex =

Psychological term

Ophelia complex is the term used by Gaston Bachelard to refer to the links between femininity, liquids, and drowning which he saw as symbolised in the fate of Shakespeare's Ophelia.

== Main theme ==
Bachelard traced in Romanticism a nexus of ideas linking the dissolution of the self – male or female – with immersion in the feminine element of water, as symbolised by Ophelia's drowning.

=== Literary offshoots ===
Federico García Lorca explored the image of water and a despairing sexuality, epitomised in the Ophelia complex, throughout his writings.

== Exteriorised adolescence ==
A later, and unconnected, use of the term Ophelia complex (Note: Alternatively: “Ophelia syndrome”; don't be confused with another use of the name, Ophelia syndrome, a medical term used for a specific type of autoimmune encephalitis) was introduced by Mary Pipher in her Reviving Ophelia of 1994. There she argued for a view of Shakespeare's character as lacking inner direction and externally defined by men (father/brother), and suggested that similar external pressures were currently faced by post-pubescent girls. The danger of the Ophelia syndrome was that of abandoning a rooted childhood self for an apparently more sophisticated but over-externalised façade self.

== See also ==
- Abjection
- Bruges-la-Morte
- Complex (psychology)
- Matriarchy
- Melusina
- Oceanic feeling

== Sources ==
- G. Bachelard, L’Eau et les rêves: Essai sur l’imagination de la matière (Paris, 1942).
- M. Pipher, Reviving Ophelia: Saving the Selves of Adolescent Girls (1994; 2011)
