= Keith LaMar =

American writer and poet (born 1969)

Keith LaMar (also known as Bomani Shakur; born May 31, 1969) is an American writer, poet, and visual artist incarcerated on death row at the Ohio State Penitentiary in Youngstown, Ohio. He was convicted in 1995 of murder in connection with killings that occurred during the 1993 Lucasville prison uprising at the Southern Ohio Correctional Facility and was sentenced to death. LaMar has maintained his innocence throughout multiple appeals.

While on death row, LaMar published a memoir, Condemned (2014), and collaborated with Catalan pianist Albert Marquès on two albums: Freedom First (2022) and Live from Death Row (2025). According to WNYC and Flood Magazine, these are the first full-length studio album and first live album, respectively, recorded by an artist on death row. LaMar's execution is scheduled for January 16, 2030.

== Early life ==
LaMar was born on May 31, 1969, in Cleveland, Ohio, and raised on the city's East Side. He has described a childhood marked by family instability and poverty.

In 1989, at age 19, LaMar fatally shot a man whom he said had attempted to rob him. He pleaded guilty to murder and was sentenced to 18 years to life in prison. He was serving that sentence at the Southern Ohio Correctional Facility in Lucasville, Ohio, at the time of the 1993 prison uprising.

== Conviction and imprisonment ==
=== The Lucasville uprising and trial ===
The Lucasville uprising was an 11-day prison uprising in April 1993 at the Southern Ohio Correctional Facility in which one corrections officer and nine incarcerated people were killed. LaMar was one of five people charged as leaders of the uprising, known as the Lucasville Five.

At his 1995 trial, LaMar was tried before an all-white jury after prosecutors used peremptory challenges to remove the only two Black potential jurors. No forensic evidence was recovered, as crime scenes had been contaminated during the uprising, and the prosecution's case rested primarily on testimony from other incarcerated people. The jury convicted him on five counts of aggravated murder and sentenced him to death. LaMar has maintained his innocence, and legal scholars including Mark Godsey, director of the Ohio Innocence Project, have stated that the defense was denied adequate access to prosecution witness statements.

Following his conviction, LaMar was held in long-term solitary confinement at the Ohio State Penitentiary in Youngstown, Ohio. In 2011, LaMar and other Lucasville Five defendants went on a 12-day hunger strike to protest conditions including restrictions on family contact and phone access. The strike ended after the Ohio Department of Rehabilitation and Correction agreed to policy changes, including limited physical contact with family members and expanded phone access.

=== Execution date ===
Ohio initially scheduled LaMar's execution for November 16, 2023. In July 2023, Governor Mike DeWine issued a reprieve, moving the execution date to January 13, 2027. In August 2026, DeWine issued a second reprieve, moving the execution date to January 16, 2030.

In 2026, attorneys from Beldock Lavine & Hoffman announced they were preparing a motion to vacate LaMar's conviction, citing what they described as new evidence of innocence, including eyewitness accounts.

== Writing ==
LaMar is the author of Condemned, an autobiographical account of his life and imprisonment. He wrote the book over eight months in 2013, composing it on a typewriter and dictating each word by phone to a friend who transcribed it. The book was published in 2014 and later reissued with an updated introduction.

LaMar's writing has also appeared in Mother Jones and MoMA Magazine.

== Music ==
=== Freedom First (2022) ===
In March 2020, Mother Jones published an article about LaMar's experience in solitary confinement, coinciding with the beginning of COVID-19 shelter-in-place orders. The article brought LaMar to the attention of musicians including Brian Jackson, a longtime collaborator of Gil Scott-Heron. Jackson reached out to LaMar, and the two created a podcast exploring connections between music and justice.

Albert Marquès, a Catalan pianist and composer based in Brooklyn, began organizing street concerts related to LaMar's case in August 2020. The first concert, held at Grand Army Plaza in Brooklyn, featured approximately 25 musicians; LaMar participated by phone from his cell. Subsequent concerts featured jazz musicians including Salim Washington, Arturo O'Farrill, Caroline Davis, and Brian Jackson. By 2023, more than 70 musicians had participated in the project.

The project developed into a studio album, Freedom First, released on February 25, 2022, by Say It Loud Records. The album features LaMar's spoken-word poetry recorded by phone over jazz compositions performed by an ensemble of international musicians. According to WNYC, the album was the first full-length recording made and released by an artist on death row. Since 2020, concerts associated with the project have been presented in the United States, Europe, and South America, with LaMar performing live by phone from his cell.

=== Live from Death Row (2025) ===
LaMar and Marquès's second album, Live from Death Row, was released on May 30, 2025. The album was recorded in September 2023 at ShapeShifter Plus in Brooklyn, with LaMar participating by phone from prison. The ensemble featured Nia Drummond (vocals), Elsa Nilsson (flute), Milena Casado (trumpet), Caroline Davis (alto saxophone), Roy Nathanson (baritone and alto saxophone), Keyanna Hutchinson (electric guitar), Matthew Garrison (electric bass), and Zack O'Farrill (drums). The album release concert took place at Joe's Pub in New York City on May 31, 2025. According to Flood Magazine, the album is the first live recording by an artist on death row.

== Visual and collaborative art ==
In 2023, LaMar collaborated with sculptor Mia Pearlman on Digest, an installation at the Eli and Edythe Broad Art Museum that incorporated LaMar's poetry and recorded voice.

In 2025, LaMar collaborated with artist Molly Crabapple on a short animated film, The Injustice of Justice, which presents LaMar's account of his case. The film received the Grand Prize for Best Animated Short at the Golden State Film Festival.

LaMar has participated as a collaborating artist with The Healing Project, an arts organization founded by composer Samora Pinderhughes. His work has been included in exhibitions by The Healing Project at the Yerba Buena Center for the Arts (2022) and the Museum of Modern Art (2026). As part of the MoMA exhibition, LaMar wrote an essay for MoMA Magazine about a painting by Faith Ringgold.

== Works ==
=== Books ===
- Condemned (2014; reissued with updated introduction)

=== Essays ===
- "The Story Doesn't Have to End" (MoMA Magazine, 2026)

=== Albums ===
- Freedom First — Keith LaMar & Albert Marquès (Say It Loud Records, 2022)
- Live from Death Row — Keith LaMar & Albert Marquès (2025)

=== Film ===
- The Injustice of Justice (2025), animated short with Molly Crabapple

== See also ==
- Lucasville prison uprising
- Capital punishment in Ohio
