= Melanie Lewy =

Austrian harpist (1823-1856)

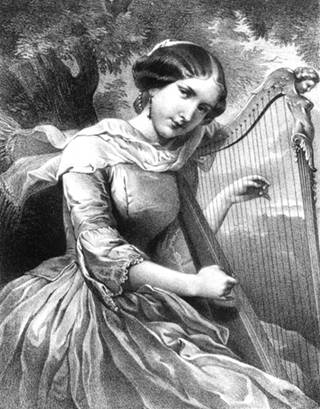
- Lithograph of Melanie Lewy by Leopold Müller (1840)
- Born: 27 July 1823; Vienna
- Died: 6 April 1856 (aged 32)
- Occupation: harpist

Melanie Lewy (27 July 1823 – 6 April 1856) was an Austrian harpist of Jewish birth.

== Early life ==
Melanie Lewy was born in 1823 in Vienna, the daughter of Eduard Constantin Lewy and his wife Johanna, née Weller. Eduard Lewy (born Elie Lewy) was the son of a musician at the court of Zweibrücken; he became an associate of Beethoven, Schubert and Schumann and is a representative of the earliest generation of Jewish musicians to be widely represented in Western music. He, his brother Rudolphe and his son Richard all became leading French horn players in Vienna. On 24 June 1835, in Vienna, her family converted from Judaism to Roman Catholicism.

== Career ==
From 1836 Melanie Lewy studied the harp with Elias Parish Alvars, who at that period was harpist at the Vienna Opera. Her performances were noted by the reviews of the time in somewhat condescending terms: for example, "the lovely and amiable Melanie, who treats the harp with a delicacy and expression that gains the hearts of all her listeners" (1841).

Melanie married Parish Alvars in 1842. They undertook concert tours in Europe both as a couple and together with other members of the Lewy family; two children were born, Aloisa in 1843 and Arthur in 1846. The death of her husband in 1849 in Vienna placed the family in great poverty; Melanie had to sell some of her clothes to pay for the funeral.

Melanie subsequently undertook a career as a soloist, based in London but travelling all over Europe, including concerts in St. Petersburg, Leipzig and Berlin. She published her husband's last compositions in London. The Neue Berliner Musikzeitung wrote in 1854 that she "undoubtedly takes the first place among the contemporary virtuosos of her instrument."

== Death ==
Melanie Lewy died in Wiesbaden on 6 April 1856 of a respiratory ailment.
