= Rooftop Film Festival =

The Rooftop Film Festival is an annual US summer independent film festival organized since July 1997 by film maker Mark Elijah Rosenberg.

Rooftop Films is a non-profit film festival that has been screening independent films since 1997. The organization hosts an annual Summer Series outdoor film festival that features more than 35 screenings. Locations include parks, along piers, or in other scenic outdoor locations, mostly in New York City.

This has also inspired many other RoofTop Film clubs all over the world.
