= Bergnart Carl Lewy =

Bergnart (Bernhard) Carl Lewy was a Danish chemist; born in Copenhagen on 5 July 1817. He died there on 1 January 1863. He obtained the degree of graduate of pharmacy in 1835, and then studied chemistry for three years at the polytechnic school. In 1839, he studied in Berlin (Ph.D.), and he spent the winter of 1839–40 in Rome. He then obtained a position as assistant in the private laboratory of J. B. Dumas in Paris.

Lewy soon proved himself to be the possessor of great experimental ability, and the Académie des Sciences in 1841 entrusted him with the task of studying the atmospheric conditions around the North and Baltic seas, as well as in Copenhagen. Later, he made a comparative test of the atmospheric conditions in Paris and in the surrounding country.

In 1847, Lewy was appointed professor of chemistry at Bogotá, New Granada, where he enjoyed great popularity and filled many honorary offices. He was decorated by the King of Denmark, and in 1859 was awarded the gold medal of honor. His writings have appeared in Annales de Chimie et de Physique, "Comptes Rendus" of the French Institute (Académie des Sciences), and in "Forhandlinger ved de skandinaviske Naturforskeres fjerde Möde" (1844).
