= Ophelia's Mom =

2001 book by Nina Shandler

- Author: Nina Shandler; Sara Shandler (foreword)
- Language: English
- Genre: Anthology
- Published: 2001
- Publisher: Crown Publishing Group
- Publication place: United States

Ophelia's Mom: Women Speak Out About Loving and Letting Go of Their Adolescent Daughters is a 2001 book written by Nina Shandler and published by Crown Publishing Group.

The book is an unofficial sequel to Ophelia Speaks which was written by Sara Shandler, the daughter of Nina Shandler. Sara Shandler wrote the foreword to Ophelia's Mom.
