= Frédéric Nicolas Duvernoy =

French composer and horn player

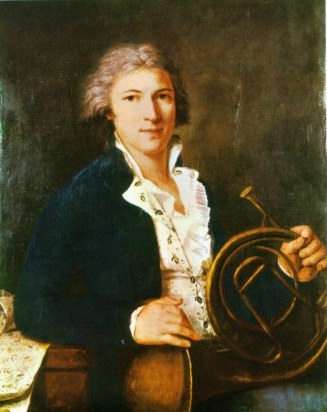
Portrait of French hornist Frédéric Nicolas Duvernoy (Bibliothèque-Musée de l'Opéra National de Paris)

Frédéric-Nicolas Duvernoy (16 October 1765, in Montbéliard – 19 July 1838, in Paris) was a French composer and hornist.

== Biography ==
In 1788, Duvernoy went to Paris and became a hornist at Orchestre de la Comédie italienne. On April 1, 1790, Duvernoy joined Orchestre de la Garde Nationale. Later, in 1795, he became professor of horn at the Paris Conservatoire and served until October 1815. He was also a member of Orchestre de l'Opéra de Paris between September 1796 and July 1817.

He will be member of La Chapelle de l'empereur Napoléon I^{er} where, with his brother Charles-Frédéric (clarinet), he will very closed with brothers Rodolphe and Jean Nicolas Auguste Kreutzer (violin), Delcambre (bassoon) and Dalvimare (harp).

== Musical works ==
- Concerto n° 1 pour cor et orchestre
- Concerto n° 2 pour cor et orchestre
- Concerto n° 3 pour cor et orchestre
- Concerto n° 4 pour cor et orchestre
- Concerto n° 5 pour cor et orchestre (with François Devienne)
- Concerto n° 6 pour cor et orchestre
- Concerto n° 7 pour cor et orchestre
- Concerto n° 8 pour cor et orchestre
- Concerto n° 9 pour cor et orchestre
- Concerto n° 10 pour cor et orchestre
- Concerto n° 11 pour cor et orchestre
- Concerto n° 12 pour cor et orchestre
- Trio pour cor, violon et piano n° 1
- Trio pour cor, violon et piano n° 2
- Trio pour cor, violon et piano n° 3
- Nocturne n° 1 pour cor et piano
- Nocturne n° 2 pour cor et piano
- Nocturne n° 3 pour cor et piano
- Nocturne pour cor et harpe n° 2 en mi bémol majeur
- Quintette pour cor, deux violon alto et basse n° 1
- Quintette pour cor, deux violon alto et basse n° 2
- Quintette pour cor, deux violon alto et basse n° 3
- Pas de manœuvre (for harmony orchester)
- Marche du sacre de Napoléon I^{er}
- Intermezzo pour flûte, opus 41 n° 2
- Sonate n° 1 pour cor et violoncelle
- Sonate n° 2 pour cor et violoncelle, en fa majeur
- Etudes faciles pour piano et orchestre, opus 176
- Symphonie concertante pour cor, harpe et orchestre
- 20 duos pour deux cors, opus 3
- 4 trios pour trois cors
- Concertino pour flûte et piano
- Douze Fantaisies pour cor et piano (or orgel)
- Quatre Divertissements pour cor et piano
- Fantaisie pour piano et cor (our alt) onto a thema by Jean-Jacques Rousseau
- Trois Sérénades pour piano et cor
- Duo pour cor et piano, published into Manuel anacréontique des Francs Maçons (Éditions des Frères Gaveau)

== Other works ==
- Méthode pour le cor 1802
- Leçons manuscrites de solfège, volume 1
- Leçons manuscrites de solfège, volume 2

== Sources ==
- Biographie universelle des musiciens de François-Joseph Fétis
- A biographical dictionary of musicians, Theodore Baker (1900)
- Le Conservatoire National de Musique Et de Déclamation Documents Historiques Et Administratifs by Constant Pierre
