= Hamlet and Oedipus =

1949 study of Hamlet by Ernest Jones

- Cover of the first American edition
- Author: Ernest Jones
- Language: English
- Subject: Hamlet
- Publisher: Norton
- Publication date: 1949, 1976
- Publication place: United States
- Media type: Print (Hardcover and Paperback)
- Pages: 166
- ISBN: 0-393-00799-5
- OCLC: 1974123
- Dewey Decimal: 822.3/3
- LC Class: PR2807 .J63 1976

Hamlet and Oedipus is a study of William Shakespeare's Hamlet in which the title character's inexplicable behaviours are subjected to investigation along psychoanalytic lines.

The study was written by Sigmund Freud's colleague and biographer Ernest Jones, following on from Freud's own comments on the play, as expressed to Wilhelm Fliess in 1897, before being published in Chapter V of The Interpretation of Dreams (1899).

== Analysis ==
In Freud's wake, Jones explains Hamlet's mysterious procrastination as a consequence of the Oedipus Complex: the son continually postpones the act of revenge because of the impossibly complicated psychodynamic situation in which he finds himself. Though he hates his fratricidal uncle, he nevertheless unconsciously identifies with him—for, having killed Hamlet's father and married his mother, Claudius has carried out what are Hamlet's own unconscious wishes. In addition, marriage to Hamlet's mother gives the uncle the unconscious status of the father—destructive impulses towards whom provoke great anxiety and meet with repression.

Jones' investigation was first published as "The Œdipus-complex as an Explanation of Hamlet's Mystery: A Study in Motive" (in The American Journal of Psychology, January 1910); it was later expanded in a 1923 publication; before finally appearing as a book-length study (Hamlet and Oedipus) in 1949.

=== Shakespeare's father ===
Freud had originally linked the writing of Hamlet (with its oedipal subtext) to the death of Shakespeare's father in 1601, but had to abandon this view when he gave his support to the Oxfordian theory of Shakespeare authorship–something Jones always rejected in his study.

== Reception ==
In 1986, the historian Peter Gay described Hamlet and Oedipus as "still controversial", noting that the work has been criticized as "literal-minded and unliterary". Gay considered Hamlet and Oedipus persuasive, but only as a "modest psychoanalytic explanation of Hamlet's hesitation".

== See also ==
Oedipus

Jocasta complex

Psychoanalytic literary criticism
