= Charmaine Chan =

American visual effects artist

- Born: Hawaii, U.S.
- Education: University of California, Irvine
- Occupation: Visual effects artist

Charmaine Chan is an American visual effects artist. She was nominated for an Academy Award in the category Best Visual Effects for the film Jurassic World Rebirth.

== Selected filmography ==
- Jurassic World Rebirth (2025; co-nominated with David Vickery, Stephen Aplin and Neil Corbould)
