= List of 2025 box office number-one films in France =

The following is a list of 2025 box office number-one films in France.

== List ==
| # | Date | Film | Box-office gross (week-end) | Notes |
|---|---|---|---|---|
| 1 | January 5, 2025 | Mufasa: The Lion King | $7,092,270 | |
| 2 | January 12, 2025 | Mufasa: The Lion King | $2,583,765 | |
| 3 | January 19, 2025 | Mufasa: The Lion King | $1,944,630 | |
| 4 | January 26, 2025 | Mufasa: The Lion King | $1,742,855 | |
| 5 | February 2, 2025 | A Complete Unknown | $1,870,242 | |
| 6 | February 9, 2025 | God Save the Tuche | $6,728,724 | |
| 7 | February 16, 2025 | Captain America: Brave New World | $5,206,327 | |
| 8 | February 23, 2025 | Captain America: Brave New World | $3,119,950 | |
| 9 | March 2, 2025 | Captain America: Brave New World | $1,914,049 | |
| 10 | March 9, 2025 | Mickey 17 | $2,822,667 | |
| 11 | March 16, 2025 | Mickey 17 | $1,706,795 | |
| 12 | March 23, 2025 | Snow White | $3,243,259 | |
| 13 | March 30, 2025 | Once Upon My Mother | $1,690,963 | |
| 14 | April 6, 2025 | A Minecraft Movie | $5,163,818 | |
| 15 | April 13, 2025 | A Minecraft Movie | $3,811,099 | |
| 16 | April 20, 2025 | A Minecraft Movie | $3,425,969 | |
| 17 | April 27, 2025 | A Minecraft Movie | | |
| 18 | May 4, 2025 | Thunderbolts* | $3,894,211 | |
| 19 | May 11, 2025 | Thunderbolts* | $2,725,189 | |
| 20 | May 18, 2025 | Final Destination Bloodlines | $2,678,224 | |
| 21 | May 25, 2025 | Lilo & Stitch | $10,916,530 | |
| 22 | June 1, 2025 | Lilo & Stitch | $11,659,572 | |
| 23 | June 8, 2025 | Lilo & Stitch | $6,188,522 | |
| 24 | June 15, 2025 | How to Train Your Dragon | $3,979,754 | |
| 25 | June 22, 2025 | How to Train Your Dragon | $2,568,480 | |
| 26 | June 29, 2025 | F1 The Movie | $5,587,733 | |
| 27 | July 6, 2025 | Jurassic World Rebirth | $6,294,164 | |
| 28 | July 13, 2025 | Jurassic World Rebirth | $3,779,807 | |
| 29 | July 20, 2025 | Smurfs | $4,946,549 | |
| 30 | July 27, 2025 | The Fantastic Four: First Steps | $5,985,554 | |
| 31 | August 3, 2025 | The Fantastic Four: First Steps | $2,831,763 | |
| 32 | August 10, 2025 | Weapons | $1,899,266 | |
| 33 | August 17, 2025 | Karate Kid: Legends | $1,394,547 | |
| 34 | August 24, 2025 | The Bad Guys 2 | $1,369,790 | . It reached the spot at his 4th weekends. |
| 35 | August 31, 2025 | The Bad Guys 2 | $1,490,322 | |
| 36 | September 7, 2025 | Fils De | $656,600 | |
| 37 | September 14, 2025 | The Conjuring: Last Rites | $9,400,000 | |
| 38 | September 21, 2025 | Demon Slayer: Infinity Castle | $7,736,366 | |
| 39 | September 28, 2025 | Demon Slayer: Infinity Castle | $2,253,428 | |
| 40 | October 5, 2025 | One Battle After Another | $2,164,251 | |
| 41 | October 12, 2025 | Tron: Ares | $1,915,385 | |
| 42 | October 19, 2025 | Dog 51 | $2,692,941 | |
| 43 | October 26, 2025 | Kaamelott: The Second Chapter | $3,743,871 | |
| 44 | November 2, 2025 | The Richest Woman in the World | $2,339,399 | |
| 45 | November 9, 2025 | T'as pas changé | $2,051,622 | |
| 46 | November 16, 2025 | Now You See Me: Now You Don't | $3,420,767 | |
| 47 | November 23, 2025 | Wicked: For Good | $1,866,843 | |
| 48 | November 30, 2025 | Zootopia 2 | $14,946,725 | |
| 49 | December 7, 2025 | Zootopia 2 | $11,036,735 | |
| 50 | December 14, 2025 | Zootopia 2 | $8,160,382 | |
| 51 | December 21, 2025 | Avatar: Fire and Ash | $22,398,266 | |

== Highest-grossing films of 2025 ==
Highest-grossing films of 2025 (In-year release)
| Rank | Title | Distributor | Domestic gross |
|---|---|---|---|
| 1. | Avatar: Fire and Ash | Walt Disney Pictures | $112,548,000 |
| 2. | Zootopia 2 | Walt Disney Pictures | $78,122,000 |
| 3. | Lilo & Stitch | Walt Disney Pictures | $45,392,188 |
| 4. | The Housemaid | Metropolitan Filmexport | $38,145,383 |
| 5. | Jurassic World: Rebirth | Universal Pictures International | $30,547,593 |
| 6. | F1 | Warner Bros | $27,385,533 |
| 7. | Mission: Impossible – The Final Reckoning | Paramount Pictures International | $25,728,815 |
| 8. | God Save the Tuche | Pathé | $23,288,475 |
| 9. | How to Train Your Dragon | Pathé | $21,806,681 |
| 10. | A Minecraft Movie | Warner Bros | $21,184,811 |

== See also ==
- 2025 in France
- 2025 in film
- List of French films of 2025

| Preceded by 2024 Box office number-one films | Box office number-one films 2025 | Succeeded by 2026 Box office number-one films |
