= List of 2022 box office number-one films in France =

The following is a list of 2022 box office number-one films in France.

== Number-one films ==
| † | This implies the highest-grossing movie of the year. |

| # | Date | Film | Box-office gross (week-end) | Notes |
|---|---|---|---|---|
| 1 | January 9, 2022 | Spider-Man: No Way Home | $3,682,759 | |
| 2 | January 16, 2022 | Spider-Man: No Way Home | $2,227,143 | |
| 3 | January 23, 2022 | Spider-Man: No Way Home | $1,479,799 | |
| 4 | January 30, 2022 | Spider-Man: No Way Home | $1,048,572 | |
| 5 | February 6, 2022 | Super Who? | $3,822,691 | |
| 6 | February 13, 2022 | Super Who? | $2,678,074 | |
| 7 | February 20, 2022 | Uncharted | $6,295,673 | |
| 8 | February 27, 2022 | Uncharted | $3,718,712 | |
| 9 | March 6, 2022 | The Batman | $7,910,398 | |
| 10 | March 13, 2022 | The Batman | $4,142,122 | |
| 11 | March 20, 2022 | The Batman | $3,441,665 | |
| 12 | March 27, 2022 | The Batman | $1,582,677 | |
| 13 | April 3, 2022 | Sonic the Hedgehog 2 | $6,026,584 | |
| 14 | April 10, 2022 | Serial (Bad) Weddings 3 | $5,574,977 | |
| 15 | April 17, 2022 | Fantastic Beasts: The Secrets of Dumbledore | $6,729,942 | |
| 16 | April 24, 2022 | Fantastic Beasts: The Secrets of Dumbledore | $4,569,228 | |
| 17 | May 1, 2022 | Fantastic Beasts: The Secrets of Dumbledore | $2,309,889 | |
| 18 | May 8, 2022 | Doctor Strange in the Multiverse of Madness | $9,555,044 | |
| 19 | May 15, 2022 | Doctor Strange in the Multiverse of Madness | $4,748,193 | |
| 20 | May 22, 2022 | Doctor Strange in the Multiverse of Madness | $2,342,660 | |
| 21 | May 29, 2022 | Top Gun: Maverick | $9,979,892 | |
| 22 | June 5, 2022 | Top Gun: Maverick | $6,900,000 | |
| 23 | June 12, 2022 | Jurassic World Dominion | $8,580,007 | |
| 24 | June 19, 2022 | Jurassic World Dominion | $3,981,199 | |
| 25 | June 26, 2022 | Lightyear | $3,158,778 | |
| 26 | July 3, 2022 | Top Gun: Maverick | $2,317,314 | |
| 27 | July 10, 2022 | Minions: The Rise of Gru | $8,145,848 | |
| 28 | July 17, 2022 | Thor: Love and Thunder | $6,799,957 | |
| 29 | July 24, 2022 | Thor: Love and Thunder | $3,904,471 | |
| 30 | July 31, 2022 | Thor: Love and Thunder | $2,188,986 | |
| 31 | August 7, 2022 | Bullet Train | $2,608,541 | |
| 32 | August 14, 2022 | Bullet Train | $1,700,000 | |
| 33 | August 21, 2022 | Bullet Train | $1,356,059 | |
| 34 | August 28, 2022 | Tad the Lost Explorer and the Emerald Tablet | $1,008,077 | |
| 35 | September 4, 2022 | La dégustation | $731,332 | |
| 36 | September 11, 2022 | Kompromat | $1,232,257 | |
| 37 | September 18, 2022 | Kompromat | $801,095 | |
| 38 | September 25, 2022 | Avatar | $1,946,323 | |
| 39 | October 2, 2022 | Avatar | $1,372,657 | |
| 40 | October 6, 2022 | Triangle of Sadness | $578,206 | |
| 41 | October 16, 2022 | Simone Veil, A Woman of the Century | $2,734,063 | |
| 42 | October 23, 2022 | Black Adam | $3,841,654 | |
| 43 | October 30, 2022 | Black Adam | $3,278,525 | |
| 44 | November 6, 2022 | Black Adam | $2,613,761 | |
| 45 | November 13, 2022 | Black Panther: Wakanda Forever | $11,552,767 | |
| 46 | November 20, 2022 | Black Panther: Wakanda Forever | $4,911,263 | |
| 47 | November 27, 2022 | Black Panther: Wakanda Forever | $3,131,200 | |
| 48 | December 4, 2022 | Black Panther: Wakanda Forever | $1,625,568 | |
| 49 | December 11, 2022 | Puss in Boots: The Last Wish | $3,387,317 | |
| 50 | December 18, 2022 | Avatar: The Way of Water † | $13,922,403 | |
| 51 | December 25, 2022 | Avatar: The Way of Water † | $21,718,708 | |
| 52 | January 1, 2023 | Avatar: The Way of Water † | $27,657,692 | |

== Highest-grossing films of 2022 ==
Highest-grossing films of 2022 (In-year release)
| Rank | Title | Distributor | Domestic gross |
|---|---|---|---|
| 1. | Avatar: The Way of Water | Disney | $157,099,579 |
| 2. | Top Gun: Maverick | Paramount Pictures | $59,789,893 |
| 3. | Black Panther: Wakanda Forever | Disney | $33,169,637 |
| 4. | Doctor Strange in the Multiverse of Madness | Disney | $29,377,696 |
| 5. | Jurassic World Dominion | Universal Pictures | $29,342,326 |
| 6. | Minions: The Rise of Gru | Universal Pictures | $26,971,275 |
| 7. | Thor: Love and Thunder | Disney | $24,703,847 |
| 8. | Puss in Boots: The Last Wish | Universal Pictures | $23,460,953 |
| 9. | The Batman | Warner Bros. | $22,742,475 |
| 10. | Fantastic Beasts: The Secrets of Dumbledore | Warner Bros. | $20,529,528 |

== See also ==
- 2022 in France
- 2022 in film
- List of French films of 2022

| Preceded by 2021 Box office number-one films | Box office number-one films 2022 | Succeeded by 2023 Box office number-one films |
