= Visual Effects Society Award for Outstanding Created Environment in a Photoreal Feature =

Award for visual effects

The Visual Effects Society Award for Outstanding Created Environment in a Photoreal Feature is one of the annual awards given by the Visual Effects Society starting from 2004. The award was originally titled "Outstanding Created Environment in a Live Action Motion Picture", and changed in 2007 to "Outstanding Created Environment in a Live Action Feature Motion Picture". It was again changed in 2009, this time to "Outstanding Created Environment in a Feature Motion Picture", and again in 2011 to "Outstanding Created Environment in a Live Action Feature Motion Picture". Before its final change in 2015, to its current title, it was re-titled in 2014 to "Outstanding Created Environment in a Photoreal/Live Action Feature Motion Picture".

== Winners and nominees ==
=== 2000s ===
Outstanding Created Environment in a Live Action Motion Picture

Year	Film	Environment	Nominee(s)
2004	Spider-Man 2	NYC Street - Night	Dan Abrams, David Emery, Andrew Nawrot and John Hart
2004	Bridget Jones: The Edge of Reason		Rick Leary, Jody Johnson and Pieter Warmington
2004	I, Robot		Rachael Haupt, Mark Tait Lewis, Nick McKenzie and Geoff Tobin
2004	The Phantom of the Opera	Opening Shot	Claas Henke, Laurent Ben-Mimoun and Anupam Das
2005	King Kong	New York Dawn Attack	Dan Lemmon, R. Christopher White, Matt Aiken and Charles Tait
2005	Batman Begins	Gotham City Monorail Chase	Alex Wuttke, Pete Bebb, Dayne Cowan and Imery Watson
2005	Harry Potter and the Goblet of Fire	Black Lake	Andy Kind, Ivan Moran, Rob Allman and Justin Martin
2005	Star Wars: Episode III – Revenge of the Sith		Jonathan Harb, Hilmar Koch, Yannick Dusseault and Brett Northcutt
2006	Pirates of the Caribbean: Dead Man's Chest		Chris Stoski, Susumu Yukuhiro, Jack Mongovan and Greg Salter
2006	Mission: Impossible III		Russell Earl, Richard Bluff, Giles Hancock and Dennis Martin
2006	Poseidon		Mohen Leo, Daniel Pearson, Willi Geiger and Matt Brumit

Outstanding Created Environment in a Live Action Feature Motion Picture

Year	Film	Environment	Nominee(s)
2007	Pirates of the Caribbean: At World's End	The Maelstrom	Frank Losasso Petterson, Paul Sharpe, Joakim Arnesson and David Meny
2007	Harry Potter and the Order of the Phoenix	The Hall of Prophecy	David Vickery, Philippe LePrince, Trina Roy and Jolene McCaffrey
2007	I Am Legend	Times Square Hunt	Daniel Eaton, Blaine Kennison, Ron Glass and Daveed Schwartz
2007	Rush Hour 3		Barry Williams, Robert Weaver, Jay Cooper and Masahiko Tani
2007	Sweeney Todd: The Demon Barber of Fleet Street	The Old Bailey	Raf Morant, Julian Glass, Nakia McGlynn and Christine Wong
2007	Zodiac	Washington and Cherry	Wei Zheng, Greg Szafranski, Janelle Croshaw and Karl Denham

Outstanding Created Environment in a Feature Motion Picture

Year	Film	Environment	Nominee(s)
2008	The Dark Knight	IMAX Gotham City Scapes	Peter Bebb, David Vickery, Philippe Leprince and Andrew Lockley
2008	Cloverfield	Brooklyn Bridge Sequence	David Vickery, Phil Johnson, Victor Wade and Sean Stranks
2008	Indiana Jones and the Kingdom of the Crystal Skull	Temple Heart	Michael Halsted, David Fogler, Steve Walton and David Weitzberg
2008	The Mummy: Tomb of the Dragon Emperor	Avalanche Sequence	Mike Meaker, Rich Mahon, Jason Iverson and Sho Hasegawa
2008	Synecdoche, New York	Created Environment	Brett Miller, Garrett Eaton and Matthew Conner
2009	Avatar	Jungle/Biolume	Eric Saindon, Shadi Almassizadeh, Dan Cox and Ula Rademeyer
2009	Avatar	Floating Mountains	Dan Lemmon, Keith F. Miller, Cameron Smith and Jessica Cowley
2009	Avatar	Willow Glade	Guy Williams, Thelvin Cabezas, Daniel Macarin and Miae Kang
2009	2012	Los Angeles Destruction	Haarm-Pieter Duiker, Marten Larsson, Ryo Sakaguchi and Hanzhi Tang

=== 2010s ===
Year	Film	Environment	Nominee(s)
2010	Inception	Paris Dreamscape	Bruno Baron, Dan Neal, Graham Page and Per Mork-Jensen
2010	Iron Man 2	Stark Expo	Giles Hancock, Richard Bluff, Todd Vaziri and Aaron McBride
2010	Prince of Persia: The Sands of Time	Sand Room	Jonathan Litt, Juan S. Gomez, Kevin Sears and Sonja Burchard
2010	Tron: Legacy	Disc Game	Jonathan Litt, Juan S. Gomez, Kevin Sears and Sonja Burchard

Outstanding Created Environment in a Live Action Feature Motion Picture

Year	Film	Environment	Nominee(s)
2011	Transformers: Dark of the Moon	155 Wacker Drive	Giles Hancock, John Hansen, Tom Martinek and Scott Younkin
2011	Anonymous	London	André Cantarel, Robert Freitag, Greg Strasz and Rony Soussan
2011	Harry Potter and the Deathly Hallows – Part 2	Hogwarts	Keziah Bailey, Stephen Ellis, Clement Gerard and Pietro Ponti
2011	Thor	Bifröst	Pierre Buffin, Audrey Ferrara, Yoel Godo and Dominique Vidal
2012	The Avengers	Midtown Manhattan	Richard Bluff, Barry Williams, David Meny and Andy Proctor
2012	The Hobbit: An Unexpected Journey	Goblin Caverns	Ryan Arcus, Simon Jung, Alastair Maher and Anthony M. Patti
2012	Life of Pi	Open Ocean	Jason Bayever, Sho Hasegawa, Jimmy Jewell and Walt Jones
2012	Prometheus	LV-233	Julien Bolbach, Marco Genovesi, Martin Riedel and Marco Rolandi
2013	Gravity	Exterior	Paul Beilby, Kyle Mcculloch, Stuart Penn and Ian Comley
2013	Elysium	Torus	Votch Levi, Joshua Ong and Barry Poon
2013	Gravity	Interior	Harry Bardak, Nathan Walster, Jonathan Fawkner and Claire Michaud
2013	Iron Man 3	Shipyard	John Stevenson-Galvin, Greg Notzelman, Paul Harris and Justin Stockton
2013	Pacific Rim	Hong Kong Ocean Brawl	Colin Benoit, Nick Walker, Adam Schnitzer and Victor Schutz

Outstanding Created Environment in a Photoreal/Live Action Feature Motion Picture

Year	Film	Environment	Nominee(s)
2014	Interstellar	Tesseract	Tom Bracht, Graham Page, Thomas Døhlem and Kristy Clark
2014	Captain America: The Winter Soldier	Triskelion	Johan Thorngren, Greg Kegel, Quentin Marmier and Luis Calero
2014	Lucy	Times Square	Richard Bluff, Steve Bevins, Steve DeLuca and Tiffany Young
2014	Noah	Antediluvian Earth	Grady Cofer, Dan Wheaton, Susumu Yukuhiro and Ben O'Brien

Outstanding Created Environment in a Photoreal Feature

Year	Film	Environment	Nominee(s)
2015	Star Wars: The Force Awakens	Falcon Chase/Graveyard	Yannick Dusseault, Mike Wood, Justin van der Lek and Quentin Marmier
2015	Ant-Man	The Microverse	Florian Witzel, Taylor Shaw, Alexis Hall and Heath Kraynak
2015	Jurassic World	Jungle Chase	Martyn Culpitt, Jao Sita, Yuta Shimizu and Michael Billette
2015	Tomorrowland	Tomorrowland Center	Barry Williams, Greg Kegel, Quentin Marmier and Thang Lee
2015	The Walk	World Trade Center	Jim Gibbs, Brian Flora, Laurent Tallefer and Pavel Kolar
2016	Doctor Strange	New York City	Adam Watkins, Martinjn van Herk, Tim Belsher and Jon Mitchell
2016	Deadpool	Freeway Assault	Seth Hill, Jedediah Smith, Laurent Taillefer and Marc-Antoine Paquin
2016	Doctor Strange	London	Brendan Seals, Raphael A. Pimentel, Andrew Zink and Gregory Ng
2016	Rogue One: A Star Wars Story	Scarif Complex	Enrico Damm, Kevin George, Olivier Vernay-Kim and Yannick Dusseault
2017	Blade Runner 2049	Los Angeles	Chris McLaughlin, Ryan Salcombe, Seungjin Woo and Francesco Dell'Anna
2017	Blade Runner 2049	Trash Meca	Didier Muanza, Thomas Gillet, Guillaume Mainville and Sylvain Lorgeau
2017	Blade Runner 2049	Vegas	Eric Noel, Arnaud Saibron, Adam Goldstein and Pascal Clement
2017	War for the Planet of the Apes	Hidden Fortress	Greg Notzelman, James Shaw, Jay Renner and Gak Gyu Choi
2017	War for the Planet of the Apes	Prison Camp	Phillip Leonhardt, Paul Harris, Jeremy Fort and Thomas Lo
2018	Ready Player One	Overlook Hotel	Mert Yamak, Stanley Wong, Joana Garrido, Daniel Gagiu
2018	Ant-Man and the Wasp	Journey to the Quantum Realm	Florian Witzel, Harsh Mistri, Yuri Serizawa, Can Yuksel
2018	Aquaman	Atlantis	Quentin Marmier, Aaron Barr, Jeffrey De Guzman, Ziad Shureih
2018	Solo: A Star Wars Story	Vandor Planet	Julian Foddy, Christoph Ammann, Clement Gerard, Pontus Albrecht
2019	The Lion King	The Pridelands	Marco Rolandi, Luca Bonatti, Jules Bodenstein, Filippo Preti
2019	Aladdin	Agrabah	Daniel Schmid, Falk Boje, Stanislaw Marek, Kevin George
2019	Alita: Battle Angel	Iron City	John Stevenson-Galvin, Ryan Arcus, Mathias Larserud, Mark Tait
2019	Motherless Brooklyn	Penn Station	John Bair, Vance Miller, Sebastian Romero, Steve Sullivan
2019	Star Wars: The Rise of Skywalker	Pasaana	Daniele Bigi, Steve Hardy, John Seru, Steven Denyer

=== 2020s ===
Year	Film	Environment	Nominee(s)
2020	Mulan	Imperial City	Jeremy Fort, Matt Fitzgerald, Ben Walker, Adrian Vercoe
2020	Bloodshot	Neuralspace	Arbanud Brisebois, Patrick Bacon, Dawid Borkiewicz, Gérôme Viavant
2020	The Eight Hundred	1937 Shanghai Downtown	Sefano Cieri, Aaron Auty, Simon Carlile, Patrick Zentis
2020	The Eight Hundred	Shanghai Warehouse District	Jamie Macdougall, Mark Honer, David Pekarek
2021	Spider-Man: No Way Home	The Mirror Dimension	Eric Le Dieu de Ville, Thomas Dotheij, Ryan Olliffe, Claire Le Teuff
2021	Dune	Arrakeen City	Rhys Salcombe, Seungjin Woo, Jeremie Touzery, Marc Austin
2021	Jungle Cruise	Waterfall Canyon	Mark McNicholl, Frédéric Valleur, Hamish Beachman, Mark Wainwright
2021	The Suicide Squad	Valle Del Marre	Nick Cattell, Jason Desjarlais, Matt Fitzgerald, Jerome Moo
2022	Avatar: The Way of Water	The Reef	Jessica Cowley, Joe W. Churchill, Justin Stockton, Alex Nowotny
2022	Avatar: The Way of Water	Metkayina Village	Ryan Arcus, Lisa Hardisty, Paul Harris, TaeHyoung David Kim
2022	Jurassic World Dominion	Biosyn Valley	Steve Ellis, Steve Hardy, Thomas Dohlen, John Seru
2022	Slumberland	The Wondrous Cuban Hotel Dream	Daniël Dimitri Veder, Marc Austin, Pavan Rajesh Uppu, Casey Gorton
2023	The Creator	Floating Village	John Seru, Guy Williams, Vincent Techer, Timothée Maron
2023	John Wick: Chapter 4	Place de L’Étoile	Joelle Xin Zhow, Fabrice Vienne, Vignesh Ravi, Laurent Makowski
2023	Indiana Jones and the Dial of Destiny	Underwater Wreck	Johan Gabrielsson, Adrian Tsang, Stefan Andersson, Martin Eneroth
2023	Guardians of the Galaxy Vol. 3	Knowhere	Omar Alejandro Lavrador Ibanez, Fabien Julvecourt, Klaudio Ladavac, Benjamin Patterson
2024	Dune: Part Two	Arrakeen Basin	Daniel Rhein, Daniel Anton Fernández, Marc James Austin, Christopher Anciaume
2024	Civil War	Washington, D.C.	Matthew Chandler, James Harmer, Robert Moore, Adrien Zeppieri
2024	Gladiator II	Rome	Oliver Kane, Stefano Farci, John Seru, Frederick Vallee
2024	Wicked	Emerald City	Alan Lam, Steve Bevins, Deepali Negi, Miguel Sánchez López-Ruíz

== Films with Multiple Nominations ==
3 Nominations

- Avatar
- Blade Runner 2049

2 Nominations

- Doctor Strange
- The Eight Hundred
- Gravity
- War for the Planet of the Apes
- Avatar: The Way of Water
