= List of 2021 box office number-one films in France =

The following is a list of 2021 box office number-one films in France.

== Number-one films ==
†	This implies the highest-grossing movie of the year.

#	Date	Film	Tickets sold	Box-office gross (week-end)	Notes
1	December 30, 2020	French cinemas closed and box office reporting suspended due to the COVID-19 pandemic			
2	January 6, 2021	French cinemas closed and box office reporting suspended due to the COVID-19 pandemic			
3	January 13, 2021	French cinemas closed and box office reporting suspended due to the COVID-19 pandemic			
4	January 20, 2021	French cinemas closed and box office reporting suspended due to the COVID-19 pandemic			
5	January 27, 2021	French cinemas closed and box office reporting suspended due to the COVID-19 pandemic			
6	February 3, 2021	French cinemas closed and box office reporting suspended due to the COVID-19 pandemic			
7	February 10, 2021	French cinemas closed and box office reporting suspended due to the COVID-19 pandemic			
8	February 17, 2021	French cinemas closed and box office reporting suspended due to the COVID-19 pandemic			
9	February 24, 2021	French cinemas closed and box office reporting suspended due to the COVID-19 pandemic			
10	March 3, 2021	French cinemas closed and box office reporting suspended due to the COVID-19 pandemic			
11	March 10, 2021	French cinemas closed and box office reporting suspended due to the COVID-19 pandemic			
12	March 17, 2021	French cinemas closed and box office reporting suspended due to the COVID-19 pandemic			
13	March 24, 2021	French cinemas closed and box office reporting suspended due to the COVID-19 pandemic			
14	March 31, 2021	French cinemas closed and box office reporting suspended due to the COVID-19 pandemic			
15	April 7, 2021	French cinemas closed and box office reporting suspended due to the COVID-19 pandemic			
16	April 14, 2021	French cinemas closed and box office reporting suspended due to the COVID-19 pandemic			
17	April 21, 2021	French cinemas closed and box office reporting suspended due to the COVID-19 pandemic			
18	April 28, 2021	French cinemas closed and box office reporting suspended due to the COVID-19 pandemic			
19	May 5, 2021	French cinemas closed and box office reporting suspended due to the COVID-19 pandemic			
20	May 12, 2021	French cinemas closed and box office reporting suspended due to the COVID-19 pandemic			
21	May 19, 2021	Bye Bye Morons	513,607	US$3,046,718	
22	May 26, 2021	Bye Bye Morons	206,447	US$1,380,942	
23	June 2, 2021	Bye Bye Morons	156,343	US$1,063,431	
24	June 9, 2021	The Conjuring: The Devil Made Me Do It	665,476	US$4,692,687	
25	June 16, 2021	The Conjuring: The Devil Made Me Do It	409,283	US$2,739,600	
26	June 23, 2021	Cruella	379,133	US$2,226,941	
27	June 30, 2021	Cruella	570,401	-	
28	July 7, 2021	Black Widow	909,000	US$6,480,900	
29	July 14, 2021	F9	1,301,589	US$9,098,413	
30	July 21, 2021	Kaamelott: The First Chapter	1,015,247	US$6,901,876	
31	July 28, 2021	Kaamelott: The First Chapter	517,930	US$3,192,995	
32	August 4, 2021	OSS 117: From Africa with Love	685,878	US$4,678,926	
33	August 11, 2021	PAW Patrol: The Movie	459,566	US$2,728,894	
34	August 18, 2021	The Stronghold	483,381	-	
35	August 25, 2021	The Stronghold	414,170	US$2,515,797	
36	September 1, 2021	Shang-Chi and the Legend of the Ten Rings	481,173	US$4,109,539	
37	September 8, 2021	Shang-Chi and the Legend of the Ten Rings	314,051	US$2,288,331	
38	September 15, 2021	Dune	1,030,687	US$7,209,360	
39	September 22, 2021	Dune	662,287	US$4,599,719	
40	September 29, 2021	Dune	500,199	US$3,506,281	
41	October 6, 2021	No Time to Die	1,384,858	US$9,648,236	
42	October 13, 2021	No Time to Die	778,195	US$5,464,847	
43	October 20, 2021	Venom: Let There Be Carnage	676,090	US$4,410,416	
44	October 27, 2021	No Time to Die	602,815	US$3,352,749	
45	November 3, 2021	Eternals	775,467	US$5,756,374	
46	November 10, 2021	Aline	595,211	US$4,060,048	
47	November 17, 2021	The Bodin's in the Land of Smile	580,181	US$3,985,886	
48	November 24, 2021	Encanto	526,906	US$3,605,709	
49	December 1, 2021	Encanto	410,852	US$2,783,153	
50	December 8, 2021	Les Tuche 4	852,098	US$5,999,727	
51	December 15, 2021	Spider-Man: No Way Home †	2,867,515	US$16,474,518	
52	December 22, 2021	Spider-Man: No Way Home †	1,737,100	US$9,600,000	

== See also ==
- List of 2023 box office number-one films in France

Preceded by 2020 Box office number-one films	Box office number-one films 2021	Succeeded by 2022 Box office number-one films
