= List of 2024 box office number-one films in France =

The following is a list of 2024 box office number-one films in France.

Number-one films

†	This implies the highest-grossing movie of the year.

#	Date	Film	Box-office gross (week-end)	Notes
1	January 7, 2024	Wonka	$4,921,165	
2	January 14, 2024	Les SEGPA au ski	$2,684,233	
3	January 21, 2024	Wonka	$1,097,492	
4	January 28, 2024	Breaking Point	$1,413,056	
5	February 4, 2024	The Zone of Interest	$1,527,757	
6	February 11, 2024	Cocorico	$3,749,392	
7	February 18, 2024	Bob Marley: One Love	$5,028,611	
8	February 25, 2024	Bob Marley: One Love	$2,785,441	
9	March 3, 2024	Dune: Part Two	$8,697,100	
10	March 10, 2024	Dune: Part Two	$6,786,290	
11	March 17, 2024	Dune: Part Two	$3,723,723	
12	March 24, 2024	Dune: Part Two	$2,746,531	
13	March 31, 2024	Kung Fu Panda 4	$5,040,013	
14	April 7, 2024	Godzilla x Kong: The New Empire	$2,942,548	
15	April 14, 2024	Ghostbusters: Frozen Empire	$1,880,037	
16	April 21, 2024	Civil War	$1,772,033	
17	April 28, 2024	Back to Black	$2,157,109	
18	May 5, 2024	A Little Something Extra †	$7,125,394	
19	May 12, 2024	Kingdom of the Planet of the Apes	$7,250,191	
20	May 19, 2024	Kingdom of the Planet of the Apes	$4,755,718	
21	May 26, 2024	A Little Something Extra †	$6,931,801	
22	June 2, 2024	A Little Something Extra †	$7,961,982	
23	June 9, 2024	A Little Something Extra †	$5,044,419	
24	June 16, 2024	A Little Something Extra †	$4,406,133	
25	June 23, 2024	Inside Out 2	$11,359,818	
26	June 30, 2024	Inside Out 2	$8,477,927	
27	July 7, 2024	Inside Out 2	$8,769,022	
28	July 14, 2024	Despicable Me 4	$6,325,810	
29	July 21, 2024	The Count of Monte Cristo	$6,022,286	
30	July 28, 2024	Deadpool & Wolverine	$9,245,476	
31	August 4, 2024	Deadpool & Wolverine	$6,075,833	
32	August 11, 2024	Deadpool & Wolverine	$3,701,007	
33	August 18, 2024	Alien: Romulus	3,960,376	
34	August 25, 2024	The Count of Monte Cristo	$2,774,013	
35	September 1, 2024	The Count of Monte Cristo	$2,360,811	
36	September 8, 2024	The Count of Monte Cristo	$2,355,871	
37	September 15, 2024	Beetlejuice Beetlejuice	$4,501,523	
38	September 22, 2024	Beetlejuice Beetlejuice	$2,394,775	
39	September 29, 2024	Beetlejuice Beetlejuice	$1,815,443	
40	October 6, 2024	Joker: Folie à Deux	$4,214,377	
41	October 13, 2024	The Wild Robot	$2,109,013	
42	October 20, 2024	Beating Hearts	$5,679,642	
43	October 27, 2024	Beating Hearts	$6,645,561	
44	November 3, 2024	Beating Hearts	$5,877,068	
45	November 10, 2024	Beating Hearts	$4,014,343	
46	November 17, 2024	Gladiator II	$10,300,000	
47	November 24, 2024	Gladiator II	$4,145,849	
48	December 1, 2024	Moana 2	$18,735,392	
49	December 8, 2024	Moana 2	$12,608,529	
50	December 15, 2024	Moana 2	$6,893,130	
51	December 22, 2024	Mufasa: The Lion King	$8,497,773	
52	December 29, 2024	Mufasa: The Lion King	$9,472,238	

== Highest-grossing films of 2024 ==
Highest-grossing films of 2024 (In-year release)
Rank	Title	Distributor	Domestic gross
1.	A Little Something Extra	Pan Media & Entertainment	$74,054,607
2.	Inside Out 2	Disney	$65,647,189
3.	Moana 2	Disney	$53,914,940
4.	The Count of Monte Cristo	Pathé	$38,954,941
5.	Deadpool & Wolverine	Disney	$37,264,715
6.	Despicable Me 4	Universal Pictures	$35,422,641
7.	Beating Hearts	StudioCanal	$35,714,047
8.	Dune: Part Two	Warner Bros.	$31,429,912
9.	Gladiator II	Paramount Pictures	$26,557,890
10.	Kingdom of the Planet of the Apes	Disney	$24,448,397

== See also ==
- 2024 in France
- 2024 in film
- List of French films of 2024

Preceded by 2023 Box office number-one films	Box office number-one films 2024	Succeeded by 2025 Box office number-one films
