= List of 2023 box office number-one films in France =

The following is a list of 2023 box office number-one films in France.

== Number-one films ==
†	This implies the highest-grossing movie of the year.

#	Date	Film	Box-office gross (week-end)	Notes
1	January 8, 2023	Avatar: The Way of Water	US$13,862,459	
2	January 15, 2023	Avatar: The Way of Water	US$10,389,797	
3	January 22, 2023	Avatar: The Way of Water	US$7,394,464	
4	January 29, 2023	Avatar: The Way of Water	US$5,187,496	
5	February 5, 2023	Asterix & Obelix: The Middle Kingdom	US$12,588,719	
6	February 12, 2023	Alibi.com 2	US$6,144,807	
7	February 19, 2023	Alibi.com 2	US$6,136,677	
8	February 26, 2023	Alibi.com 2	US$5,210,697	
9	March 5, 2023	Creed III	US$7,483,163	
10	March 12, 2023	Creed III	US$3,419,130	
11	March 19, 2023	Creed III	US$2,161,511	
12	March 26, 2023	Sur les chemins noirs	US$2,841,342	
13	April 2, 2023	Shazam! Fury of the Gods	US$1,861,757	
14	April 9, 2023	The Super Mario Bros. Movie †	US$9,873,000	
15	April 16, 2023	The Super Mario Bros. Movie †	US$8,756,042	
16	April 23, 2023	The Super Mario Bros. Movie †	US$7,753,943	
17	April 30, 2023	The Super Mario Bros. Movie †	US$5,834,000	
18	May 7, 2023	Guardians of the Galaxy Vol. 3	US$9,704,317	
19	May 14, 2023	Guardians of the Galaxy Vol. 3	US$5,740,498	
20	May 21, 2023	Fast X	US$9,136,618	
21	May 28, 2023	The Little Mermaid	$3,705,342	
22	June 4, 2023	Spider-Man: Across the Spider-Verse	$3,625,100	
23	June 11, 2023	Transformers: Rise of the Beasts	$3,064,691	
24	June 18, 2023	The Flash	$2,612,042	
25	June 25, 2023	Elemental	$2,502,954	
26	July 2, 2023	Indiana Jones and the Dial of Destiny	$5,966,988	
27	July 9, 2023	Ladybug & Cat Noir: The Movie	$4,314,713	
28	July 16, 2023	Mission: Impossible – Dead Reckoning Part One	$7,700,000	
29	July 23, 2023	Oppenheimer	$6,933,935	
30	July 30, 2023	Oppenheimer	$6,291,837	
31	August 6, 2023	Barbie	$5,702,245	
32	August 13, 2023	Barbie	$3,429,822	
33	August 20, 2023	Barbie	$2,571,328	
34	August 27, 2023	Barbie	$2,215,132	
35	September 3, 2023	The Equalizer 3	$2,520,255	
36	September 10, 2023	The Equalizer 3	$1,116,213	
37	September 17, 2023	The Nun II	$3,108,440	
38	September 24, 2023	The Nun II	$1,756,045	
39	October 1, 2023	The Creator	$1,987,720	
40	October 8, 2023	Bernadette	$1,600,000	
41	October 15, 2023	The Exorcist: Believer	$1,853,724	
42	October 22, 2023	A Difficult Year	$2,596,266	
43	October 29, 2023	Trolls Band Together	$2,700,162	
44	November 5, 2023	The Boy and the Heron	$4,944,163	
45	November 12, 2023	The Marvels	$3,054,754	
46	November 19, 2023	The Hunger Games: The Ballad of Songbirds & Snakes	$4,232,815	
47	November 26, 2023	Napoleon	$5,600,000	
48	December 3, 2023	Wish	$4,311,967	
49	December 10, 2023	Wish	$2,591,698	
50	December 17, 2023	Wonka	$5,350,111	
51	December 24, 2023	Wish	$1,618,027	
52	December 31, 2023	Wonka	$5,815,324	

== Highest-grossing films of 2023 ==
Highest-grossing films of 2023 (In-year release)
Rank	Title	Distributor	Domestic gross
1.	The Super Mario Bros. Movie	Universal Pictures	$62,851,536
2.	Barbie	Universal Pictures	$44,039,205
3.	Asterix & Obelix: The Middle Kingdom	Pathé	$42,548,143
4.	Oppenheimer	Universal Pictures	$35,398,462
5.	Alibi.com 2	StudioCanal	$33,465,278
6.	Wonka	Warner Bros. Pictures	$32,314,655
7.	Guardians of the Galaxy Vol. 3	Disney	$27,075,549
8.	The Three Musketeers: D'Artagnan	Pathé	$26,168,091
9.	Elemental	Disney	$24,566,749
10.	Indiana Jones and the Dial of Destiny	Disney	$24,191,016

== See also ==
- 2023 in France
- 2023 in film
- List of French films of 2023

Preceded by 2022 Box office number-one films	Box office number-one films 2023	Succeeded by 2024 Box office number-one films
