= Jurassic World Rebirth =

2025 film by Gareth Edwards

- Theatrical release poster
- Directed by: Gareth Edwards
- Written by: David Koepp
- Based on: Characters by Michael Crichton
- Produced by: Frank Marshall; Patrick Crowley
- Starring: Scarlett Johansson; Mahershala Ali; Jonathan Bailey; Rupert Friend; Manuel Garcia-Rulfo; Ed Skrein
- Cinematography: John Mathieson
- Edited by: Jabez Olssen
- Music by: Alexandre Desplat (Note: Original Jurassic Park themes by John Williams)
- Production company: Amblin Entertainment
- Distributed by: Universal Pictures
- Release dates: June 17, 2025 (Leicester Square); July 2, 2025 (United States)
- Running time: 134 minutes
- Country: United States
- Language: English
- Budget: $180–254.2 million (Note: Attributed to multiple references:)
- Box office: $872.4 million

Jurassic World Rebirth is a 2025 American monster science fiction action film directed by Gareth Edwards and written by David Koepp. The sequel to Jurassic World Dominion (2022), it is the fourth installment in the Jurassic World film series, as well as the seventh installment overall in the Jurassic Park franchise. The film features Scarlett Johansson, Mahershala Ali, Jonathan Bailey, and Ed Skrein. In Jurassic World Rebirth, the world's de-extinct dinosaurs live around the equator, which provides the last viable climate for them to survive. A team travels to a former island research facility where three specific gigantic species of dinosaurs reside, with the goal of extracting samples that are vital for a heart disease treatment. The team also rescues a shipwrecked family, and both groups struggle to survive after becoming stranded on the island.

Work on the film began shortly after the release of Jurassic World Dominion (2022), when executive producer Steven Spielberg recruited Koepp to help him develop a new installment in the series. Koepp previously co-wrote the original Jurassic Park film (1993) and wrote its sequel, The Lost World: Jurassic Park (1997). Development of Rebirth was first reported in January 2024. Edwards was hired as director a month later, and casting commenced shortly thereafter. Principal photography took place in Thailand, Malta, and the United Kingdom from June to September 2024, with a budget of $180–254 million.

Jurassic World Rebirth premiered on June 17, 2025, at Odeon Luxe Leicester Square in London, and was released in the United States and Canada by Universal Pictures on July 2. The film received mixed reviews from critics, though some deemed it an improvement over previous entries. It became the sixth-highest-grossing film of 2025, grossing over $872 million worldwide – the first feature in the franchise since Jurassic Park III to not reach $1 billion. At the 98th Academy Awards, it was nominated for Best Visual Effects, making it the first film in the Jurassic Park franchise since The Lost World to receive an Oscar nomination in any category. A sequel is in development.

== Plot ==
In 2010, InGen operates a dinosaur genetics laboratory on Île Saint-Hubert, located in the Atlantic Ocean. It houses transgenic and mutated dinosaurs that the company head deemed disturbing. (Note: In Jurassic World (2015), Simon Masrani was the owner.) When a six-limbed Tyrannosaurus called Distortus rex escapes containment, all personnel abandon the island.

During 2027, most of Earth's climate is unsuitable for the de-extinct animals (Note: In Jurassic World: Fallen Kingdom (2018), dinosaurs are transported from Isla Nublar to California with some shipped to undisclosed locations. Jurassic World Dominion (2022) confirms that the animals have spread globally.) that InGen and other companies created. Most of the remaining animals survive in equatorial regions with climates similar to the Mesozoic Era, where exclusion zones have been established for them. Martin Krebs, an executive at pharmaceutical company ParkerGenix, enlists Zora Bennett, a former covert operative, to work with paleontologist Dr. Henry Loomis on a classified mission to collect DNA-containing biomaterial samples from three large prehistoric specimens, which are crucial for a new cardiovascular disease treatment. In Suriname, Zora recruits longtime associate Duncan Kincaid to lead the expedition, along with maritime pilot LeClerc, mercenary Nina, and security expert Bobby Atwater.

The team illegally travels to Île Saint-Hubert to gather bio-samples from the aquatic Mosasaurus, terrestrial Titanosaurus, and flying Quetzalcoatlus. Meanwhile, Reuben Delgado is sailing near the island with his daughters Teresa and Isabella, and Teresa's boyfriend, Xavier Dobbs. When a Mosasaurus attacks and overturns their sailboat, Reuben sends a distress call. Despite Martin insisting the group stay on mission, the expedition team rescues the family. The Mosasaurus resurfaces, and the team successfully collects a blood sample using a modified dart gun. A pack of Spinosaurus joins the Mosasaurus in attacking the ship, killing Bobby. To maintain the mission's secrecy, Martin prevents Teresa radioing for help and does nothing to prevent her from falling overboard. Xavier jumps in to rescue her, followed by Reuben and Isabella, separating them from the team. The ship runs aground on the island, where a Spinosaurus kills Nina. Zora reveals that a rescue helicopter will circle the island in 24 hours if there is radio silence. The team locate a herd of Titanosaurus and obtain a sample. It is decided it is safer to retrieve the Quetzalcoatlus specimen – the amniotic liquid – from an egg. Zora, Henry, and LeClerc rappel down a cliff to a nest inside an ancient cave temple. A Quetzalcoatlus returns and devours LeClerc, but Zora and Henry secure the last sample.

Meanwhile, the Delgados make it ashore and search for the abandoned InGen complex, hoping to find a radio there. They encounter various dinosaurs, including a Mutadon, a hybrid raptor/pterosaur; and an Aquilops, which Isabella names Dolores and adopts. The group finds an inflatable raft and, after surviving a Tyrannosaurus rex attack, proceed down a river.

Both groups reunite at the InGen complex. When Teresa exposes Martin, he threatens everyone with a handgun, takes the samples, and escapes to the helipad in a UTV. A group of Mutadons descend on the others, who flee through underground tunnels. The rescue helicopter arrives, but the Distortus rex destroys it, killing the pilots. Escaping into another tunnel, the survivors find a locked gate at the end, with a boat and the gate control panel on the opposite side. As a pursuing Mutadon approaches, Isabella fits through the gate bars and unlocks it. The team escapes while Martin, who is forced to drive off the road after almost having crashed into an Ankylosaurus, is devoured by the Distortus. Zora retrieves the samples and the group launch the boat while Duncan distracts the Distortus with a flare.

Zora, Henry, Reuben, Teresa, Xavier, and Isabella escape in the boat. Duncan survives and signals the group, who rescue him. Zora and Henry decide to distribute the biomaterial as an open source resource, ensuring global access.

== Cast ==
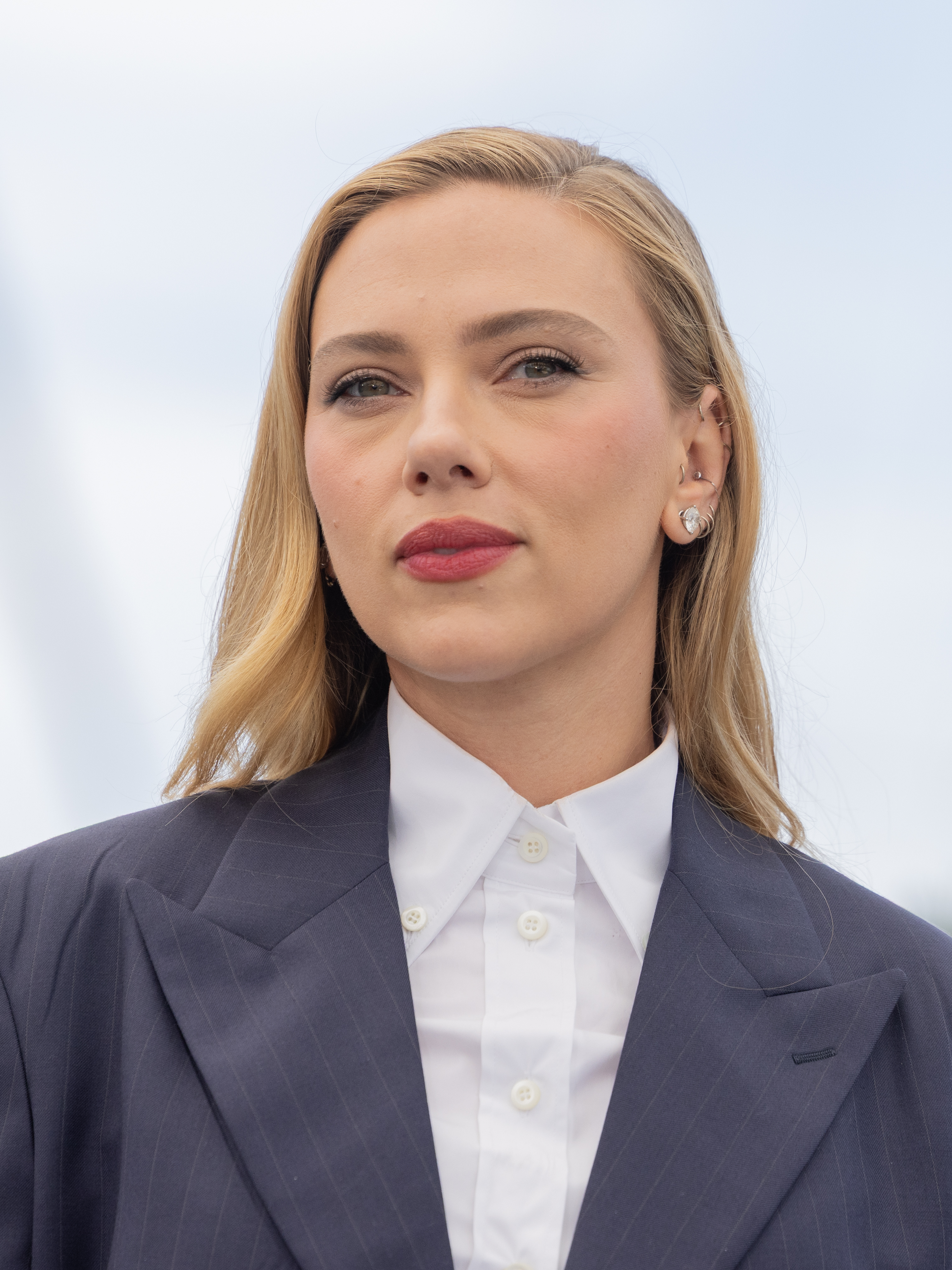
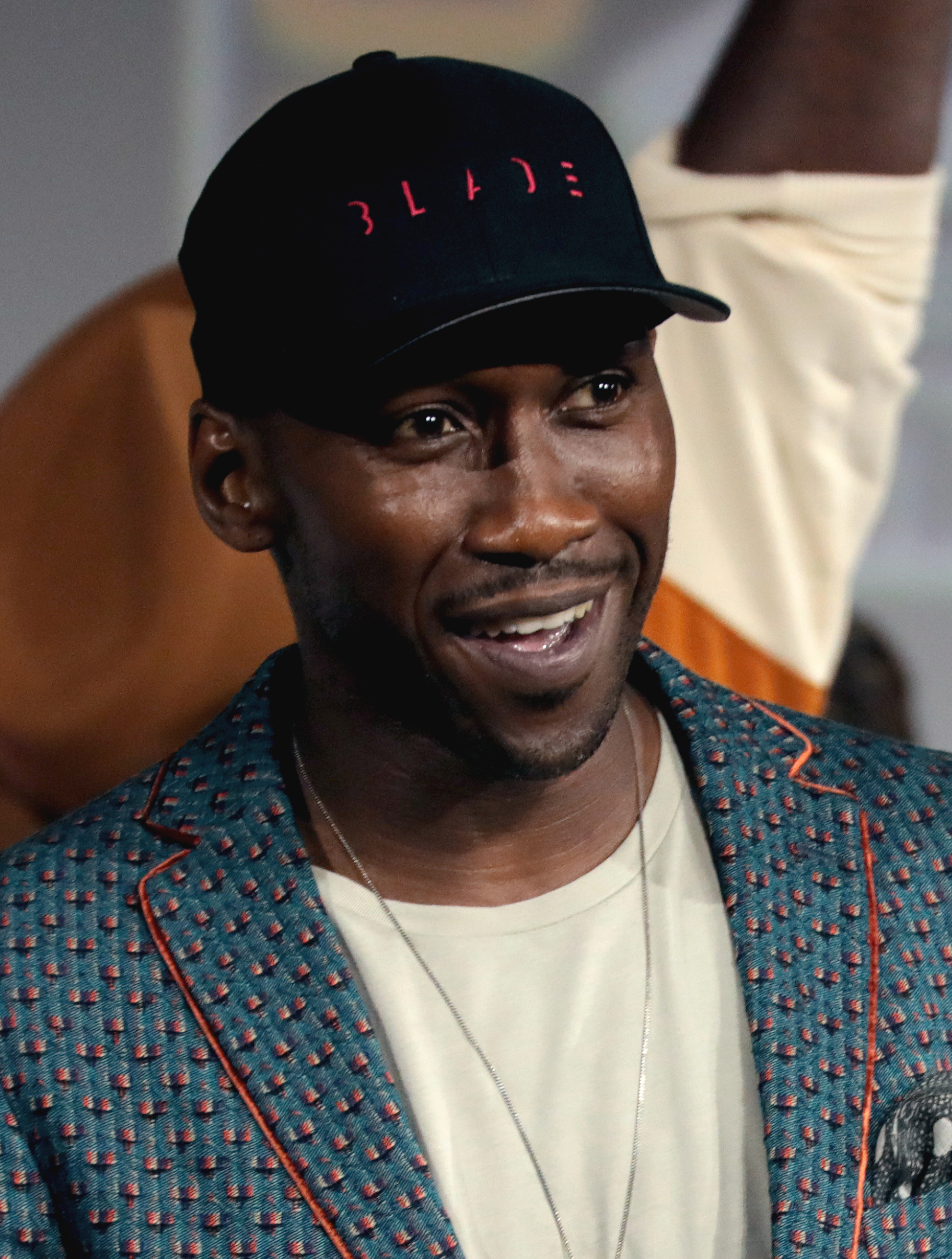
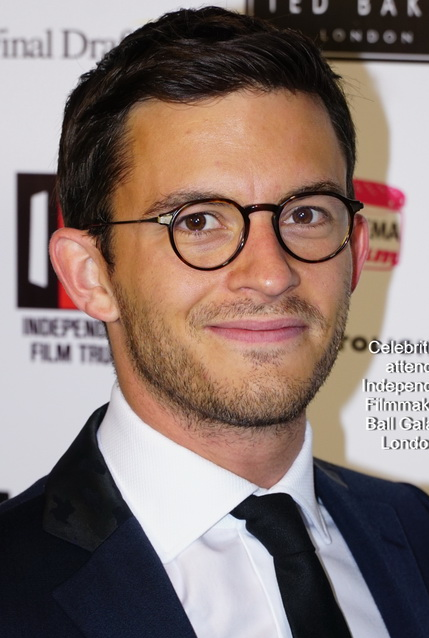
(L:R) Scarlett Johansson, Mahershala Ali, and Jonathan Bailey lead the film's cast.
- Scarlett Johansson as Zora Bennett, a covert operation expert
- Mahershala Ali as Duncan Kincaid, Zora's team leader
- Jonathan Bailey as Dr. Henry Loomis, a paleontologist
- Rupert Friend as Martin Krebs, a pharmaceutical representative
- Manuel Garcia-Rulfo as Reuben Delgado, the father of a shipwrecked civilian family
- Ed Skrein as Bobby Atwater, a member of Zora's team
- David Iacono as Xavier Dobbs, Teresa's boyfriend
- Luna Blaise as Teresa Delgado, Reuben's eldest daughter
- Audrina Miranda as Isabella Delgado, Reuben's youngest daughter
- Bechir Sylvain as LeClerc, a French-speaking member of Zora's team
- Philippine Velge as Nina, a member of Zora's team

== Production ==
=== Background ===
David Koepp co-wrote the original film, Jurassic Park (1993); he shared screenplay credit with Michael Crichton, who authored the novels Jurassic Park (1990) and The Lost World (1995). Koepp returned as sole writer on the latter's film adaptation The Lost World: Jurassic Park (1997). Steven Spielberg directed both films and would return as an executive producer for future installments in the Jurassic Park franchise.

Koepp initially turned down the chance to write another film, believing he had nothing left to contribute to the series. He was still consulted for subsequent films and eventually did uncredited script work on Jurassic World Dominion (2022). Colin Trevorrow spent nine years working on the Jurassic World trilogy as a director and co-writer, and said he would likely not return for another film, except in a possible advisory role. He ultimately had no involvement with Jurassic World Rebirth.

=== Development ===
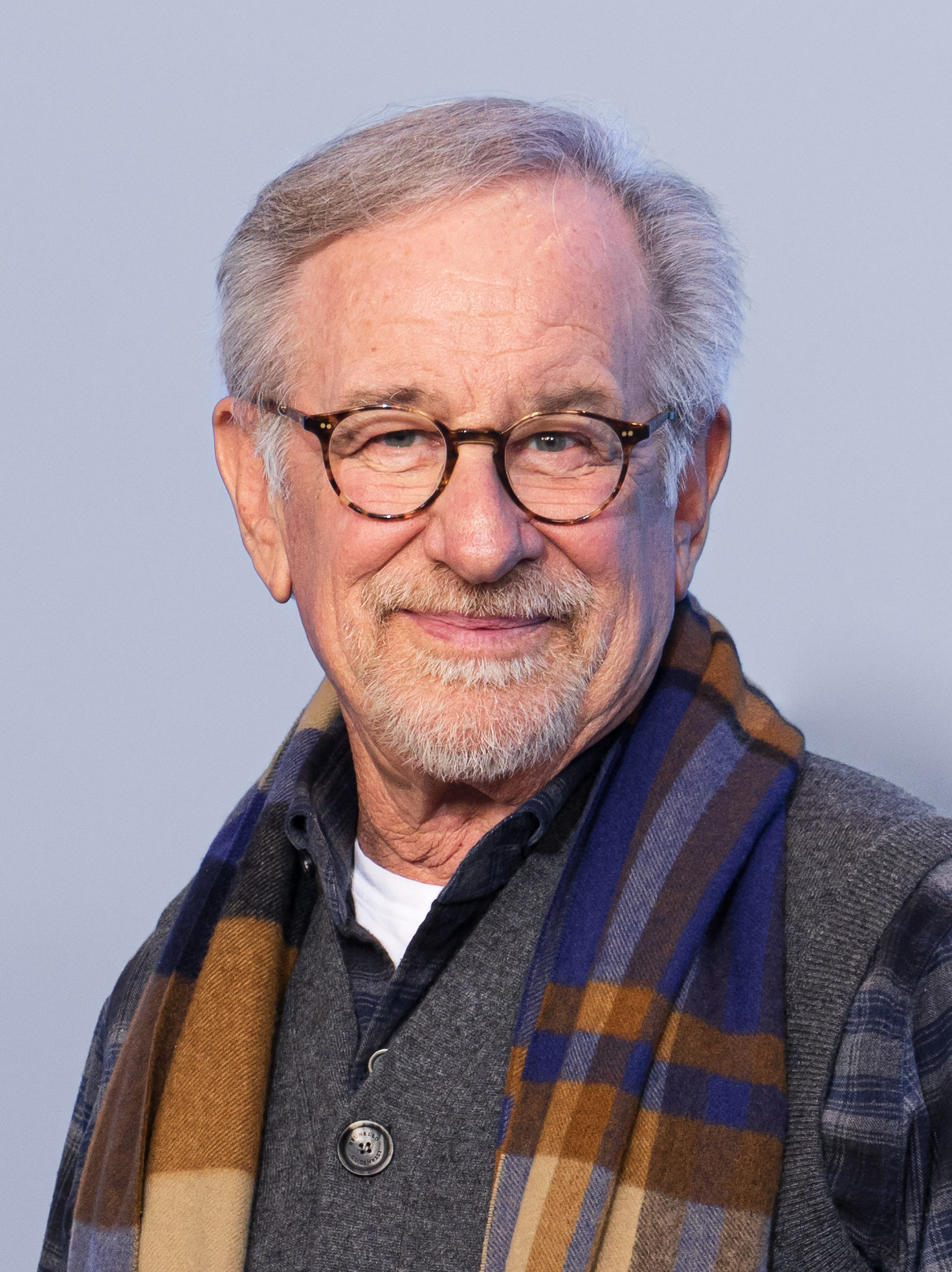
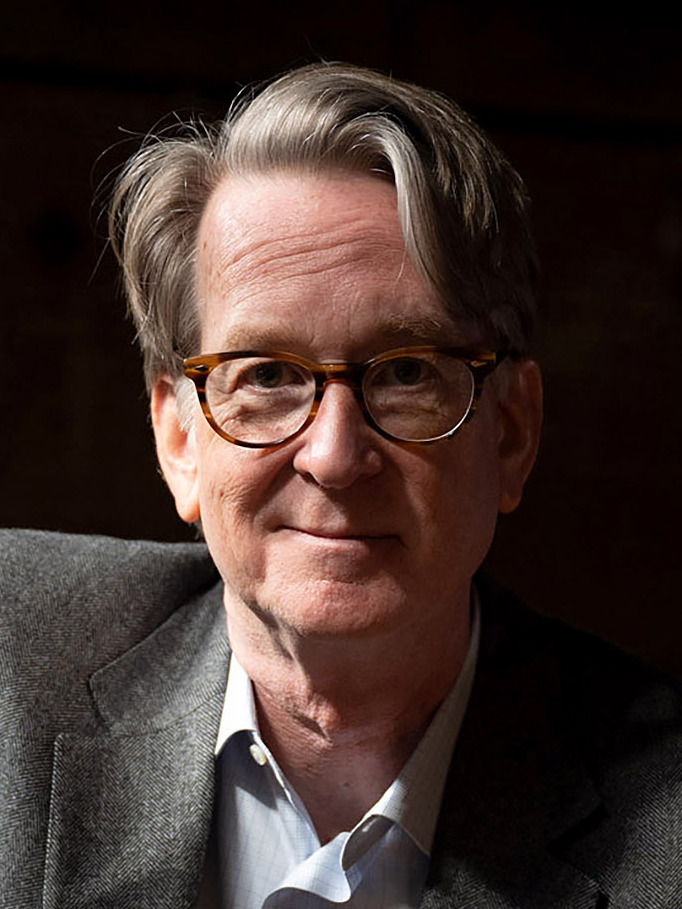
Executive producer Steven Spielberg and writer David Koepp

Development on Jurassic World Rebirth began shortly after the release of Dominion, with an early story idea from Spielberg that features heavily in the final film. Spielberg had brought his idea to Koepp and asked him about writing a new film in the series, which led to an exchange of other ideas. Koepp took on the project upon learning how deeply involved Spielberg would be in crafting it. They worked closely to develop the screenplay over a six-month period, seeking to revive the tone of the original Jurassic Park trilogy, particularly the first film. Koepp also said, "We decided early on that, because the first and second trilogies have concluded their stories, let's not restrict ourselves in any way – let's have all-new characters in an all-new location."

Koepp wanted to revisit the concept of humans in a dinosaur environment, whereas the two preceding films had shifted toward the animals living among people around the world, of which Koepp said, "I don't know where else to go with that." He felt that this idea had been thoroughly explored, furthermore saying, "Once that happened, you can go anywhere in the world and you can have as many crazy dinosaur situations as you want. I was more limited. I find limitations freeing. [...]. I think we actually had an easier time than the three Jurassic World movies because they got so big and that becomes hard to work with."

Koepp and Spielberg devised a story involving a secret island facility, used for dinosaur research and development, then had to determine why characters would visit such a place. According to Koepp:

"While doing research, I found that certain dinosaurs, larger ones in particular, did have extraordinarily long lifespans and the reason was they had remarkably low incidences of heart disease. That led to the idea that a drug could be synthesized from their DNA, because the greatest killer of humans is heart disease."

Ben Lamm, co-founder of Colossal Biosciences, said the premise is realistic: "There's hidden cures and hidden data in all these species that we're losing." The idea of mutant dinosaurs was inspired by the hybridized dinosaurs in earlier Jurassic World films; Koepp said that he and Spielberg realized the hybrids "can't all have gone well. This is genetic experimentation. Things are not going to work out sometimes." Initially, Koepp planned to feature the character Atwater more heavily, having him eventually partner with Krebs to betray the others.

Before writing the script, Koepp rewatched the preceding six films in the franchise. He also reread Crichton's Jurassic Park novels, for the first time in nearly 30 years, incorporating concepts from both books. Rebirth includes a sequence from the first novel that was cut from its film adaptation, in which characters in a raft must escape from a Tyrannosaurus rex. A monologue by the character Henry Loomis was also pulled from the novel, and additionally includes an un-used line of dialogue that Koepp wrote for the character Ian Malcolm in an early draft of Jurassic Park.

Aside from the inclusion of dinosaurs, Koepp had no story requirements to follow in writing the script, although he did compile a list of rules for himself. These included that the film being based on accurate science, that it would not retcon any events from the previous films, and that humorous dialogue be included. He also sought to depict the non-mutant dinosaurs as animals rather than monsters, stating that their actions are driven by either hunger or territorial defense.

By September 2023, Koepp had begun writing the screenplay in earnest, turning in a draft three months later. Frank Marshall and Patrick Crowley, producers of the Jurassic World trilogy, would return for Rebirth. Although another installment was expected at some point, Marshall and Crowley were unaware that Spielberg was already working on the project until the first draft was turned in. With a mid-2025 release date being targeted, the producers were surprised by the limited amount of production time, but they soon determined it to be adequate.

=== Pre-production ===
The project was unveiled in late January 2024, when it was reported that a new Jurassic World film was in development by Universal Pictures. Like the previous Jurassic World films, the new installment would be produced by Marshall and Crowley through The Kennedy/Marshall Company, while Spielberg would executive produce through Amblin Entertainment. Development of the project had been underway for some time, with several drafts already written by Koepp. The producers had also done some pre-production work, including dinosaur designs, meaning that any creative input from the eventual director would be minimal. The position was reportedly described as being "more shooter than auteur", as the producers sought to have more creative control than Jurassic World Dominion, which earned mostly negative reviews.

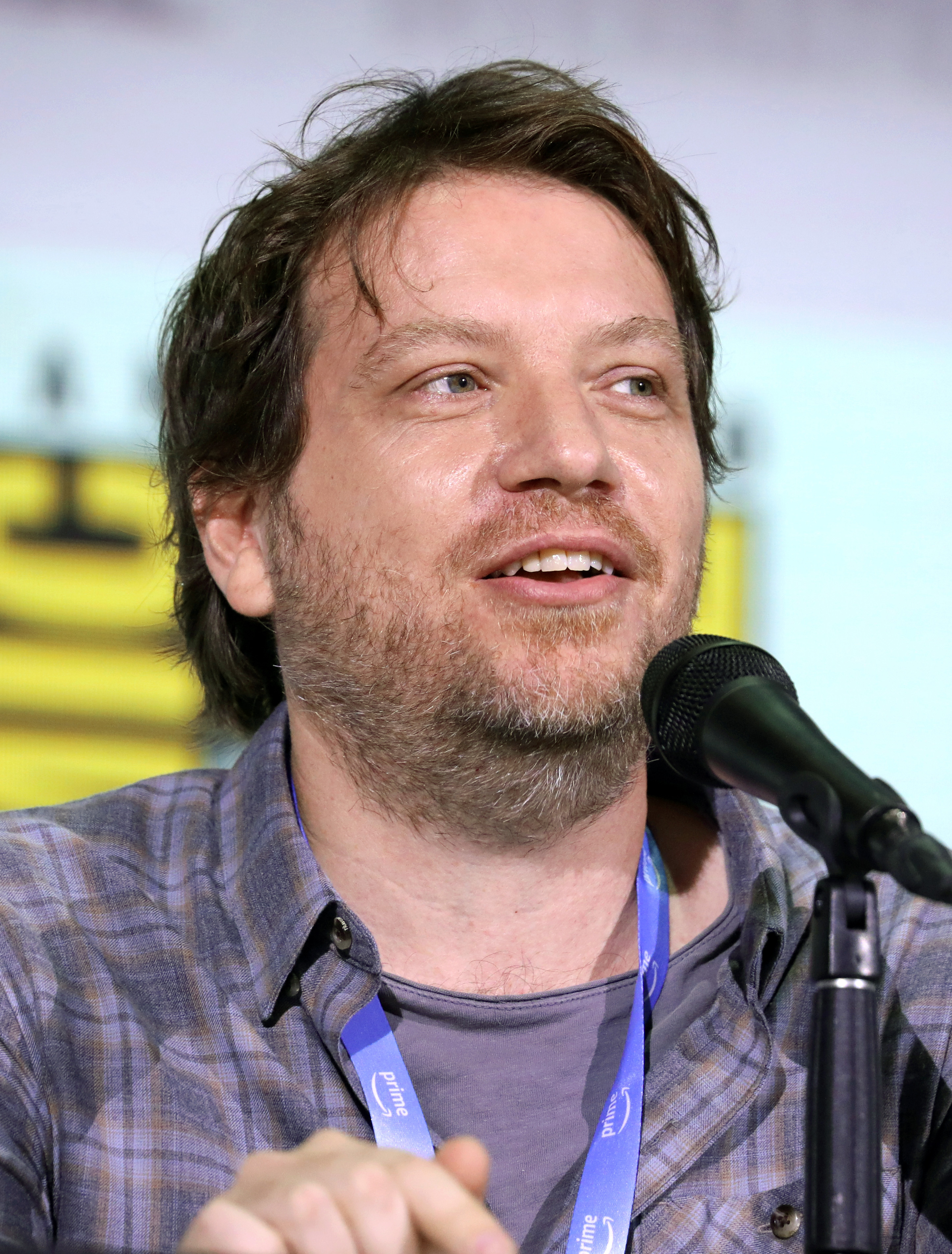
Director Gareth Edwards

David Leitch, who previously served as a second unit director on Jurassic World, was briefly considered to become the director of the film during early February 2024, but negotiations broke down after several days, as the project's progress up to that point left little room for his creative input. Edgar Wright also turned down the offer to direct the film in favor to direct his dream project The Running Man (2025) instead. Gareth Edwards was announced as director later that month, having been selected because of the visual style he used in his previous films, which was considered ideal for the Jurassic World series. His experience with computer-generated imagery (CGI) was also a factor in his selection. Furthermore, Spielberg enjoyed Edwards' film Godzilla (2014) and Edwards is a fan of the original Jurassic Park.

After completing the film The Creator (2023), Edwards planned to take a break from studio filmmaking to focus on his own projects instead. He was busy writing a new film when he was offered the Jurassic World project, which he described as "the only movie that would make me drop everything like a stone and dive right in". Feeling depleted after finishing The Creator, he hoped that Koepp's draft would give him reason to turn down the directing job but was instead won over. He met with Marshall and subsequently Spielberg to discuss the project and possible changes, and was soon hired as director. Edwards had less than a year and a half to get the film finished, a process that he said would normally take two and a half years. Early on, he suggested delaying the film's release, but this idea was immediately rejected. He credited Koepp's script for the quick turnaround: "Everybody was pointing at that going, 'Go make that; that's what we want.' And so it was just quite a relatively smooth ride".

Edwards aimed to follow Koepp's script by maintaining its balance of humor and horror elements, the latter being emphasized more so than in previous Jurassic World films. Koepp encouraged Edwards to make suggestions for improving the script. A scene involving a Quetzalcoatlus nest was among those modified by Edwards; originally written to take place on a cliff, he changed the setting to an abandoned ancient temple. A sequence at a gas station mini mart was initially set in a different location, but was also changed by Edwards. He ultimately found the film's shortened production time to be beneficial: "If you have too much time, you procrastinate, you try things that don't work".

=== Casting ===
Jurassic World Rebirth is the first film in the series to not include any returning actors from previous installments. Casting was underway in March 2024, and continued over the next three months.

Various actors were considered to play Zora, including Jennifer Lawrence, who turned down the role. Scarlett Johansson was already a fan of the franchise and hoped to join it for more than a decade. While Rebirth was in development, she arranged a meeting with Spielberg and pitched the idea of joining the cast in some capacity. Edwards, after signing on as director, learned of Johansson's interest and immediately cast her as Zora. She worked with Koepp to further develop her character.

Jonathan Bailey would also be cast, at the suggestion of Universal executives who were impressed with his performance as Fiyero Tigelaar in the film Wicked (2024). Edwards cast Manuel Garcia-Rulfo after seeing him in an episode of the television series The Lincoln Lawyer. Likewise, he cast Rupert Friend after being impressed by a performance he gave in an episode of Homeland. Friend worked with Koepp to make his character more dimensional.

Other actors cast in the film included Mahershala Ali, Luna Blaise, David Iacono, Audrina Miranda, and Béchir Sylvain. Glen Powell, who voiced Dave in the animated series Jurassic World Camp Cretaceous (2020–2022), turned down a role. Powell was reportedly in talks to play Dr. Henry Loomis but declined the role, saying "There's somebody better that's gonna breathe more life into this, or can do a better job than I can. And you just have to be realistic about that. Sometimes you put yourself out of a job, but that's okay."

=== Filming ===
John Mathieson served as the cinematographer. Edwards hoped to emulate Spielberg's filmmaking style, and shot the project using 35mm film, his first time doing so, to harken back to the look of the first film. The production used Panaflex Millennium XL2 cameras and vintage C- and E-Series anamorphic lenses from Panavision. Additional equipment included an ARRI 235 camera for handheld photography, and a range of Angénieux and Elite zoom lenses. The E-Series lenses were favored for their cleaner rendering, and scenes were framed in the 2.40:1 aspect ratio. Night scenes in the jungle were primarily shot using day-for-night techniques to reduce lighting complexity in remote locations. Kodak's Vision3 film stock was used for the production and was processed at Kodak Film Lab in the UK. The final digital intermediate grade used a vintage Kodak print emulation LUT, with limited color correction to maintain the natural grain and color of the film scan.

Costa Rica was strongly considered as a filming location to depict the fictional Île Saint-Hubert, although other possible locations included the Dominican Republic, Mauritius, and Panama. Once Edwards was hired, he suggested shooting in Thailand, where he filmed The Creator. Spielberg and the producers immediately approved the idea, finding the country's landscapes ideal for depicting Île Saint-Hubert. Also filmed in Thailand, at a small fishing village, was a beach bar scene set in Suriname where Zora meets with Duncan. Edwards sought to do as much on-location filming as possible. James Clyne, production designer for The Creator, would join Edwards again for Jurassic World Rebirth. As filming began, Spielberg turned full creative control over to Edwards and was later impressed by the dailies.

Principal photography began in Thailand on June 13, 2024, under the working title Saga, with filming lasting a month in the country. Locations included Khao Phanom Bencha National Park in Krabi, Ko Kradan at Hat Chao Mai National Park in Trang, and Ao Phang Nga National Park in Phang Nga. Sunset Beach on Ko Kradan was used for the scene in which Duncan's boat crashes on Île Saint-Hubert. The Titanosaurus sequence was shot on a field in Thab Prik, located in Krabi. Clyne's team was unsuccessful in growing high grass for the scene, due to a drought, and instead hired a horticulturist from England to achieve this by installing an irrigation system. Shooting in Thailand was made difficult by the presence of venomous water snakes and insects. The use of film also presented a downside, as the dailies had to be shipped to England for processing. According to executive producer Denis Stewart, "It was five days of wondering if that film was going to get there okay, wondering if we could move on and strike the set and let an actor leave or if we were going to need to reshoot a scene or let it go. But not a single problem arose."

Filming moved to the Malta Film Studios in Kalkara, Malta in July 2024. Filming there included boat attack sequences involving the Mosasaurus. Some of the stunts were filmed in water tanks at the studio site, and ocean shooting took place on the nearby Mediterranean Sea. Complex shots were filmed in the tanks, with boats placed on hydraulic gimbals. These were built by special effects supervisor Neil Corbould, who had worked with Edwards on previous films. Most of the tank sequences were shot without any water, which would be added in later through CGI. Edwards acknowledged that filming the ocean sequences was "very difficult". Johansson said, "There was no escape from the sun. It was just baking every day. And you're on this rig, 30 feet [9 meters] in the air or whatever it is, and it's moving up and down and sideways, and there's all this water being shot out of these cannons towards you. It was brutal."

In August 2024, filming moved to London and Sky Studios Elstree in the United Kingdom. The InGen facility, including research rooms and a network of tunnels, was constructed on three sound stages at Sky Studios. The laboratory was the most expensive set built for the film. An artificial jungle, the gas station mini mart, and the interiors of Duncan's boat and the ancient temple were among other sets constructed at Sky Studios. Also built there was a 70-foot (21 m) cliff wall for when Zora's team rappels down to the temple. A waterfall was added to this scene through visual effects, using footage of the Jog Falls in Shivamogga district, Karnataka, India. A museum scene was shot at the Old Royal Naval College in Greenwich, London.

The start of the T. rex river chase was filmed at a flooded quarry in Thailand, while the remainder was shot in the U.K. at Lee Valley White Water Centre in Hertfordshire. On-set rocks and CGI landscaping would be used for the latter location. Garcia-Rulfo performed several of his own stunts, and he and Iacono learned scuba diving for the aquatic scenes. Friend had to be suspended from a wire for the scene depicting the death of his character, Krebs. Ali's character, Duncan, was originally written to have been killed by the Distortus rex. Once Ali was cast, Universal believed that due to his star status, the character should live. Edwards and Ali successfully pushed for Duncan to die as written, but were later told by Universal to film an additional scene while in Thailand to show that he survived, in the event that such an outcome should be chosen. Edwards ultimately decided to add this additional footage into the final film.

Koepp was on set in London during the final weeks of filming, and made himself readily available to Edwards before then through text messaging. Edwards requested minor rewrites on several occasions, sometimes minutes before shooting a scene. Filming wrapped on September 27, 2024, although pick-up shots were made in New York City three weeks later.

=== Creatures on screen ===
Industrial Light & Magic (ILM) returned from previous installments to handle the CGI for dinosaurs and other prehistoric animals featured in the film. Because of its limited pre-production period, the Jurassic World Rebirth crew did not have time to make heavy usage of animatronics, marking a departure from the film's two predecessors. However, on-set materials were still used to aid the actors. John Nolan returned from Jurassic World Dominion to build practical dinosaur parts, including heads, limbs and claws. These were primarily used as lighting and eyeline references, and would be replaced with CGI dinosaur models in post-production, as Edwards sought to maintain design consistency by avoiding an on-screen combination of production methods. Unlike previous films, ILM had only six weeks to finalize the dinosaur designs for Rebirth as a result of its truncated pre-production. Paleontologist Stephen L. Brusatte returned from Dominion as a dinosaur consultant. Edwards chose not to include fully-feathered dinosaurs because he thought they "looked like big chickens and weren't all that scary," according to ILM's visual effects supervisor David Vickery, although some of the animals would be given filaments or proto-feathers.

In the film, it is stated that public interest in dinosaurs has decreased. Metaphorically, Edwards viewed the animals somewhat like films, referencing the decline of movie theaters and the rise of streaming platforms. He saw the mutant dinosaur storyline as "some strange version of the situation we're in as filmmakers, where, like, how do you get people excited about this stuff again?"

The design of the Distortus rex was inspired by the xenomorphs in the Alien franchise and the rancors in the Star Wars franchise. With its bulbous head, Vickery stated, "It's as if another animal has been wrapped around the T. rex. Gareth wanted us to feel sorry for it as well as terrified, because its deformities have caused it some pain, and there's an encumbrance to it." Edwards was heavily involved in the design of the Distortus rex, whose traits include gorilla-like arms and movements at his suggestion.

Another type of mutant animal, the flying Mutadons, are a combination of a pterosaur and Velociraptor. They were inspired by an encounter that Koepp had with a bat on his porch. Koepp described the Mutadons as a failed early attempt by InGen to create hybridized dinosaurs. The Mutadons underwent many design changes, some depicting the creature with multiple heads and varying limb configurations, as ILM sought to maintain a balance between science fiction and believability. The final design was selected around the end of 2024, after nine months.

To establish the film's Tyrannosaurus as a different individual than the ones depicted in the previous installments, the dinosaur was redesigned to draw influence from the 1969 film The Valley of Gwangi. Vickery described it as "a healthier, heavier, more muscular, more bull-like" animal, while retaining the typical look of a Jurassic Park T. rex. The raft sequence proved challenging for ILM as the team had to determine how the animal would move while it is underwater.

Rebirth includes the return of Spinosaurus, a dinosaur previously featured in the film Jurassic Park III (2001), of which Edwards is a fan. For Rebirth, the Spinosaurus was redesigned to reflect newer research which determined the animal to be primarily semiaquatic. According to Vickery, "We've given it more powerful hind limbs, a much bigger, broader tail, webbing in between its feet, and the appearance of a shorter more powerful neck by adding fatty deposits and extra skin folds." To determine the design and behavior of the Spinosaurus, ILM studied crocodiles and grizzly bears. Mosasaurus also received a new design. To emphasize its sense of scale, the Mosasaurus goes through many size changes over the course of the film, more so than any other creature.

Other returning species include Apatosaurus, Ankylosaurus, Compsognathus, Dilophosaurus, Parasaurolophus, Pteranodon, and Quetzalcoatlus. Compsognathus and Quetzalcoatlus were given new designs. Like all previous installments, the film features the return of Velociraptor, albeit in a brief scene establishing the Mutadons as a deadlier threat. Velociraptor received a new design inspired by the raptors in Jurassic Park III.

New species include creatures such as Titanosaurus and the pterosaur Anurognathus. Nature videos of giraffes and swans were studied for a scene depicting Titanosaurus mating rituals, and an elephant was brought on to walk through the grass field in Thailand as a reference for the CGI artists.

One of the primary dinosaurs, also new to the film series, is Aquilops. The production used three on-set animatronics, each measuring 18 inches in length and operated remotely by a team of puppeteers. The primary animatronic had numerous motors to simulate movements such as breathing, blinking, and tail wagging. This was used for close interactions with the cast, while another animatronic was used in scenes where characters pick the creature up, and a third was used for lighting reference. Because of their abundant use of 3D-printed parts, these puppets weighed less than typical animatronics.

=== Post-production ===
By the end of 2024, Edwards finished his first cut of Jurassic World Rebirth. He wanted the film to be under two hours long, and his cut was one minute below this mark, excluding the credits. Edwards removed five minutes to achieve this, but ultimately restored the footage at the request of Universal executives. Three other scenes are absent from the final theatrical cut, two of which Edwards was fine with removing. The third consisted of additional material for the gas station sequence; he described it as "a little bit more like being hunted. The tension of something coming." It was cut because it slowed down the film's third act, which was written to be fast-paced. According to Edwards, the best advice that Spielberg gave him was to reduce sequences during post-production: "He was saying, 'It's like a meal. The best version is [consumers] leave just slightly hungry, then they'll get back in the queue and do it all over again."

While in post-production, Edwards briefly considered the idea of having a T. rex show up in the ending to battle the Distortus rex and inadvertently save the humans. Other filmmakers on the project rejected this idea for lack of originality, noting that previous installments in the series already ended with a dinosaur battle. The film already had numerous Easter eggs referencing the original Jurassic Park. Upon seeing an early cut of Rebirth, Spielberg and Koepp requested that these references be removed entirely, although Edwards was ultimately allowed to keep most of them. Among the exceptions was Mr. DNA, an animated character in the original film, who was cut from an exposition scene in Rebirth.

By March 2025, Edwards was working seven days a week with ILM and film editor Jabez Olssen to have the project finished in time for its release. In total, Jurassic World Rebirth contains 1,515 visual effects shots, the most of any film in the Jurassic series. ILM completed over 1,000 of those shots and the rest were done by other vendors including Important Looking Pirates (ILP) and Midas. The film was completed in May 2025.

=== Music ===
Jurassic World Rebirth was scored by Alexandre Desplat, reuniting with Edwards after Godzilla and further replacing Michael Giacchino, who composed the previous installments in the Jurassic World series. Recorded at the Abbey Road Studios in London, with a 105-piece orchestra and a 60-piece choir, the score incorporates previous musical themes by John Williams, who composed the scores for the first two Jurassic Park films. Bailey performed the clarinet solo. The soundtrack was released by Back Lot Music on July 2, 2025, simultaneous with the film.

== Marketing ==
The film's title and a pair of first-look photos were unveiled on August 29, 2024. Jurassic World Rebirth was promoted as a homage to the first Jurassic Park and was marketed toward fans of that film. The first trailer was released on February 5, 2025, preceded by multiple film stills. Discussing the trailer, Ben Travis from Empire felt the film was "visually stunning" and reminiscent of the first Jurassic Park. A 60-second TV spot was broadcast at Super Bowl LIX on February 9, 2025. The second trailer was released on May 20, 2025.

Mattel and Lego produced a line of film-based toys as part of the promotional campaign. Other marketing partners included 7-Eleven (including Speedway and Stripes) and Funko. Professional basketball player Shai Gilgeous-Alexander also appeared in a television commercial that aired during the 2025 NBA playoffs. Universal wanted Johansson to join Instagram to promote Jurassic World Rebirth, but she declined, believing the film would be successful without her doing so. However, she appeared in an online video to promote the Mattel toyline.

== Release ==
Jurassic World Rebirth premiered on June 17, 2025, at Odeon Luxe Leicester Square in London. Universal released the film in the United States on July 2, 2025.

=== Home media ===
The film was released on digital download on August 5, 2025, and was released on 4K Ultra HD Blu-ray, Blu-ray and DVD on September 9, 2025.

As part of Universal's long-term deal with Amazon Prime Video for its live-action films, the film began streaming on Peacock on October 30, 2025, before moving to Prime Video for the next ten months, and returning to Peacock for the remaining four.

== Reception ==
=== Box office ===
Jurassic World Rebirth grossed $339.6 million in the United States and Canada, and $532.8 million in other territories, for a worldwide total of $872.4 million.

==== Domestic ====
The Hollywood Reporter initially projected a $100–125 million 5-day opening weekend in the United States and Canada while Deadline Hollywood projected $115–135 million. In the week of release, Deadline Hollywood projected a global opening weekend of around $260 million, with a domestic five-day gross of $120–130 million. On July 5, 2025, the film was projected to make $312 million worldwide during its five-day opening weekend.

The film made $30.5 million on its opening day, which led to projections for its five-day opening weekend increasing to $133.5 million. It then made $25.3 million the next day, which resulted in the opening weekend prediction being revised to $137.5 million. On July 4, it made $26.3 million at the domestic box office, which resulted in Deadline Hollywood revising its five-day domestic opening weekend box growth estimate to $141.2 million. On July 5, it made $35.6 million domestically, which resulted in Deadline Hollywood increasing its 5-day opening weekend projection to $145.3 million. It ended up debuting to $147.8 million over the five-day Fourth of July holiday, topping the box office, including $92 million for the three-day weekend, and $322.6 million worldwide during this time as well.

In its second weekend, the film made $40.3 million, a 56.2% decline, finishing in second place behind then-newcomer Superman. Jurassic World Rebirth finished its run as seventh highest-grossing film of 2025 in the U.S. and Canada.

==== International ====
In India, the film set a franchise record by having the highest day one gross without any premieres. The film's highest-grossing territories include China ($41 million), the United Kingdom ($16.6 million), Mexico ($13.9 million), and Germany ($7.6 million).

Shortly after completing a full week, the film had grossed just under $410 million worldwide. It remained at the top of the Chinese box office during its second weekend, grossing $11.1 million.

=== Critical response ===
On the review aggregator website Rotten Tomatoes, 50% of 404 critics' reviews are positive, with an average rating of 5.6/10. The website's consensus reads: "Going back to basics with rip-roaring set pieces and fossilized clichés, Jurassic World Rebirth doesn't evolve this prehistoric franchise but does restore some of its most reliable DNA." Metacritic, which uses a weighted average, assigned the film a score of 50 out of 100, based on 55 critics, indicating "mixed or average" reviews. Audiences polled by CinemaScore gave the film an average grade of "B" on an A+ to F scale.

Early reactions to the film by critics were mixed.

- Peter Debruge of Variety felt that Rebirth "offers an updated version of the same basic ride Spielberg offered 32 years earlier, and yet, it hardly feels essential to the series' overall mythology, nor does it signal where the franchise could be headed."
- David Rooney of The Hollywood Reporter wrote: "Edwards clearly is a devoted Spielberg fan, embedding subtle homages throughout, notably in the open water sequences that recall Jaws. Jurassic World Rebirth is unlikely to top anyone's ranked franchise list. But longtime fans should have a blast."
- Peter Bradshaw of The Guardian wrote: "The latest installment marks a return to form after some recent duds, with all the expected Spielberg-style set pieces and excellent romantic chemistry between the leads".
- Bill Bria of TheWrap wrote: "Jurassic has to live with setting a high bar, of course — the original film revolutionized the industry, a status that Rebirth is all too aware of, as seen in its meta theme of dinosaurs becoming old news to a jaded populace. Yet just because cheeseburgers are now available anywhere doesn't mean that they can't be damn tasty. Jurassic Park Rebirth is just a well made cheeseburger, and whether that's filling and interesting enough is up to your own appetite."
- Peter Hammond of Deadline Hollywood wrote: "It might sound like a challenge to believe these humans would sign up to visit a forbidden jungle for guaranteed encounters with truly frightening and gigantic creatures out of another time in order to essentially get blood samples, but if you are game to go with that premise, a good time will be had for all."
- Tim Robey of The Daily Telegraph awarded Rebirth a perfect five stars and called it the best film in the series since the original. He also praised the film's visual and sound design, calling it the best-looking and best-sounding since the first film.
- Empire-based critic Ian Freer stated: "It's not doing much daring or different but this delivers a fun, well-made summer theme-park ride, with fast highs and slow lows. Pleasurable, though it doesn't linger."
- Caryn James of BBC stated that Rebirth "follows the template created by the original Jurassic Park – but it's no match for it" and considered it the weakest in the franchise.
- Alison Wilmore of Vulture stated that "Audiences may not have run out of enthusiasm for what the Jurassic Worlds are selling, or at least they haven't yet, but the people tasked with making them sure are out of ideas. Rebirth, as though fulfilling its franchise's own prophecy, really does manage to be boring."
- Meagan Navarro of Bloody Disgusting wrote: "Jurassic World Rebirth takes a step in the right direction, but the previous trilogy backed this franchise so thoroughly into a corner that it may be time to let this series go extinct."
- David Jenkins of Little White Lies wrote: "Edwards's involvement was the one thing keeping the candle aflame in terms of our hopes that this moribund, never-ending franchise might have turned a corner. Yet even working at full pelt, there's just too much that's wrong and silly and derivative about this tired, tired run-out. The actors are competent; there are a few tasty zingers; the effects are seamless. But the whole enterprise just feels like the same thing we've seen over and over again, and that the addition of a 'new hat' has been deemed more of an irritant than a gift to create something fresh."
- Siddhant Adlakha of Inverse wrote: "Rebirth has nothing truly new, and it seldom presents anything old with ingenuity or with a mischievous spark. It should, in that case, come as a relief that it has only nominal connections to the rest of the series."
- Christy Lemire of RogerEbert.com wrote: "There are some sporadic joys here in the clever sight gags, the sleight of hand, the bait and switch. These moments remind us of the mindless summertime excitement the Jurassic movies have long provided, albeit with diminishing returns. But that giant footprint just isn't as imposing as it used to be."
- Chris Bumbray of JoBlo.com wrote: "One of the summer's bigger disappointments, Jurassic World: Rebirth might finally prove that this is a franchise in need of a long break."
- Amy Nicholson of Los Angeles Times was critical of the film, calling it "a straight monster movie with zero awe or prestige."
- Critics from the Los Angeles Times, Cracked.com, El País, and Pajiba found the film's overt product placement from such brands as Snickers and Heineken to be distracting.

=== Accolades ===
Award	Date of ceremony	Category	Recipient(s)	Result	Ref.
Academy Awards	March 15, 2026	Best Visual Effects	David Vickery, Stephen Aplin, Charmaine Chan, and Neil Corbould	Nominated	
Astra Creative Arts Awards	December 11, 2025	Best Visual Effects	David Vickery, Stephen Aplin, Charmaine Chan, Simone Coco, and Neil Corbould	Nominated	
Chinese American Film Festival	November 7, 2025	Most Popular U.S. Film in China	Jurassic World Rebirth	Honored (Note: This award does not have a single winner, but recognizes multiple films.)	
Environmental Media Awards	October 11, 2025	Feature Film	Jurassic World Rebirth	Nominated	
Golden Trailer Awards	May 28, 2026	Best Sound Editing in a TV Spot	Universal Pictures / Big Picture	Nominated	
Guild of Music Supervisors Awards	February 28, 2026	Best Music Supervision in a Trailer (Film)	Scenery Samundra and Gregory Sweeney ("Jurassic World Rebirth – Official Trailer")	Nominated	
Hollywood Music in Media Awards	November 19, 2025	Best Original Score in a Sci-Fi/Fantasy Film	Alexandre Desplat	Nominated	
International Film Music Critics Association	February 26, 2026	Score of the Year	Alexandre Desplat	Nominated	
International Film Music Critics Association	February 26, 2026	Best Original Score for a Fantasy/Science Fiction Film	Alexandre Desplat	Nominated	
Make-Up Artists & Hair Stylists Guild Awards	February 14, 2026	Best Contemporary Make-Up (Feature-Length Motion Picture)	Jana Carboni, Charlie Hounslow, Nik Buck, Aisling Nairn, and Lauren Baldwin	Nominated	
Nickelodeon Kids' Choice Awards	November 14, 2026	Favorite Movie	Jurassic World Rebirth	Nominated	
Nickelodeon Kids' Choice Awards	November 14, 2026	Favorite Movie Actress	Scarlett Johansson	Nominated	
Saturn Awards	March 8, 2026	Best Science Fiction Film	Jurassic World Rebirth	Nominated	
Taurus World Stunt Awards	February 22, 2026	Best High Work	Eduardo Gago Muñoz (Note: The performer rappels down a cliff face, then free falls to a goldtail dead stop. Performer is ratcheted off a cliff face and freefalls to a goldtail dead stop on the cliff face. He then does a controlled fall through the trees and lands in shallow water.)	Won	
Visual Effects Society Awards	February 25, 2026	Outstanding Visual Effects in a Photoreal Feature	David Vickery, Carlos Ciudad, Steve Aplin, Charmaine Chan, and Neil Corbould	Nominated	
World Soundtrack Awards	October 10, 2026	Film Composer of the Year	Alexandre Desplat (Note: Also for Eagles of the Republic (2025), Frankenstein (2025), and L'homme qui rétrécit (The Shrinking Man) (2025))	Nominated	

== Sequel ==
In May 2026, it was announced that a sequel to Rebirth was in development. The following month, Koepp gave an update, revealing that nobody has figured out yet how to "logically and in a scientifically believable way expand" the franchise.

In August 2026, it was announced that Edwards would no longer direct the sequel due to "creative differences", and that David Koepp had completed an updated rewrite of the script. In October 2026, J. A. Bayona was reported to be in consideration to direct the sequel, after previously directing Jurassic World: Fallen Kingdom.

== See also ==
- List of films featuring dinosaurs
