= Jurassic World Dominion =

2022 film by Colin Trevorrow

- Theatrical release poster
- Directed by: Colin Trevorrow
- Screenplay by: Emily Carmichael; Colin Trevorrow
- Story by: Derek Connolly; Colin Trevorrow
- Based on: Characters by Michael Crichton
- Produced by: Frank Marshall; Patrick Crowley
- Starring: Chris Pratt; Bryce Dallas Howard; Laura Dern; Jeff Goldblum; Sam Neill; DeWanda Wise; Mamoudou Athie; BD Wong; Omar Sy
- Cinematography: John Schwartzman
- Edited by: Mark Sanger
- Music by: Michael Giacchino (Note: Original Jurassic Park themes by John Williams)
- Production companies: Universal Pictures; Amblin Entertainment; The Kennedy/Marshall Company; Perfect World Pictures
- Distributed by: Universal Pictures
- Release dates: May 23, 2022 (Mexico City); June 10, 2022 (United States)
- Running time: 147 minutes
- Country: United States
- Language: English
- Budget: $683.7 million (gross); $552.3 million (net)
- Box office: $1.004 billion

Jurassic World Dominion is a 2022 American science fiction action film directed by Colin Trevorrow, who co-wrote the screenplay with Emily Carmichael. The sequel to Jurassic World: Fallen Kingdom (2018), it is the third installment in the Jurassic World film series and sixth installment overall in the Jurassic Park franchise. Chris Pratt, and Bryce Dallas Howard reprise their roles from the previous films, along with Laura Dern, Jeff Goldblum, and Sam Neill (his final film in the franchise), who appear together for the first time since the original Jurassic Park. Also joining the cast was DeWanda Wise.

The film is set four years after the events of Fallen Kingdom, with dinosaurs and other de-extinct prehistoric animals now living alongside humans around the world. It follows Owen Grady and Claire Dearing as they embark on a rescue mission, while Alan Grant, Ellie Sattler and Ian Malcolm work to expose a conspiracy by the genomics corporation Biosyn. Planning for the film began in 2014, before the release of the first Jurassic World film. Filming took place from February to November 2020 in Canada, England, and Malta. With an estimated net budget of $552 million, it is the most expensive film ever made. Because of the COVID-19 pandemic, filming was suspended for several months and the release was delayed by a year.

Jurassic World Dominion premiered in Mexico City on May 23, 2022, and was released in the United States by Universal Pictures on June 10. It received generally negative reviews from critics, although an extended edition included with the home media release was met more positively. Like its predecessors, the film was a financial success and grossed $1 billion worldwide, becoming the third-highest-grossing film of 2022. A sequel, Jurassic World Rebirth, was released on July 2, 2025.

== Plot ==
Four years after the Lockwood Estate incident that followed the volcanic eruption of Isla Nublar, (Note: As depicted in Jurassic World: Fallen Kingdom (2018).) once-extinct dinosaurs freely roam the Earth, breeding exponentially and increasing their numbers. Amid global efforts to control them, Biosyn Genetics establishes a dinosaur preserve in Italy's Dolomites and conducts genomics research, ostensibly for pharmacological applications.

Claire Dearing, Zia Rodriguez, and Franklin Webb investigate illegal dinosaur breeding sites, also gathering proof of animal cruelty. Claire's partner, Owen Grady, helps relocate stray dinosaurs. At their remote cabin in the Sierra Nevada mountains, Claire and Owen secretly raise 14-year-old Maisie Lockwood (Benjamin Lockwood's seemingly biogenetic granddaughter) and protect her from groups seeking to exploit her unique genetic makeup.

When Blue, the last of the Velociraptors Owen raised and trained, arrives at the cabin with an asexually-reproduced hatchling, Maisie names it Beta. Increasingly frustrated living in seclusion, Maisie sneaks away to explore. Mercenaries searching for Maisie find and kidnap her and Beta.

Meanwhile, swarms of giant locusts are devastating U.S. crops. Dr. Ellie Sattler observes that crops grown with Biosyn seeds are left uneaten, raising suspicions that Biosyn created the insects. Ellie, who is now divorced, takes a captured locust to her colleague and former romantic partner, paleontologist Dr. Alan Grant. They determine the locust was genetically engineered with Cretaceous-period and contemporary DNA.

Franklin, now with the CIA's dangerous-species division, discloses to Claire and Owen that the mercenaries are at Malta. Upon arrival there, they infiltrate a dinosaur black market with Owen's former Jurassic World colleague Barry Sembène, who is leading a French Intelligence raid. Carnivorous dinosaurs are unleashed during the foray, wreaking havoc. When Claire and Owen learn that Maisie and Beta were transported to the Biosyn facility, sympathetic cargo pilot Kayla Watts agrees to fly them there.

Chaotician Dr. Ian Malcolm now works for Biosyn. He sought Ellie's help to expose CEO Dr. Lewis Dodgson after communications director Ramsay Cole warned him of Dodgson's illegal and irrational activities. Dodgson is exploiting dinosaurs and forcibly coerces former InGen geneticist Dr. Henry Wu to modify the transgenic locust to let Biosyn corner the world's food supply. Wu denounces the plan, warning it will cause an ecological collapse as the locusts spread unchecked.

Wu meets Maisie and explains that his former colleague, Dr. Charlotte Lockwood (Benjamin Lockwood's deceased daughter) used her own DNA to replicate herself, giving birth to a genetically identical Maisie. To protect Maisie from the same fatal disease, she altered Maisie's DNA by injecting her with a custom-engineered pathogen. Wu believes that Maisie and Beta's asexual conception and DNA are key to recreating Charlotte's pathogen to halt the locust outbreak.

A Quetzalcoatlus attacks Kayla's plane in Biosyn's airspace, forcing Owen and Kayla to crash-land while Claire is safely ejected. On the ground, Claire narrowly avoids a Therizinosaurus, while Owen and Kayla escape a Pyroraptor. All three are soon reunited. Inside Biosyn, Ian and Ramsay covertly advise Ellie and Alan on where to obtain a locust DNA sample. While searching for the lab, they encounter Maisie. Discovering the breach, Dodgson attempts to incinerate the locusts to destroy evidence; some escape through an air vent while ablaze, sparking a raging firestorm surrounding the preserve.

Alan, Ellie, and Maisie barely escape the facility before finding Ian. They meet up with Owen, Claire, and Kayla, then are attacked by a Giganotosaurus before taking shelter in an observation tower. Ramsay joins them after abandoning Dodgson, who flees with dinosaur embryos (Note: Initially stolen by Dennis Nedry on Dodgson's orders in Jurassic Park (1993), and obtained by Dodgson in the fifth season of Jurassic World Camp Cretaceous (2022).) via a hyperloop. When the power is cut, Dodgson becomes trapped and is killed by three Dilophosaurus. As the group works together, Owen, with Alan and Maisie's help, capture Beta. They and Wu escape in a Biosyn helicopter amidst a fight between the Giganotosaurus and Isla Nublar's former resident Tyrannosaurus, Rex, (Note: An individual commonly known offscreen as Rexy.) the latter assisted by the Therizinosaurus.

Ellie and Alan rekindle their romance before testifying with Ian and Ramsay against Biosyn. Owen, Claire and Maisie return home and reunite Beta and Blue. Wu releases a host locust carrying the pathogen, gradually eradicating the swarms. Dinosaurs, animals and humans adapt to a new co-existence, and the United Nations officially declares Biosyn Valley an international dinosaur sanctuary.

== Cast ==
- Chris Pratt as Owen Grady: Ethologist, US Navy veteran, and former Jurassic World employee responsible for training Velociraptors. Claire's boyfriend and Maisie's adoptive father.
- Bryce Dallas Howard as Claire Dearing: Former Jurassic World manager and founder of the Dinosaur Protection Group. Owen's girlfriend and Maisie's adoptive mother.
- Sam Neill as Dr. Alan Grant: Paleontologist, a consultant who traveled to John Hammond's original Jurassic Park, and a survivor of the Isla Sorna expedition depicted in Jurassic Park III (2001).
- Laura Dern as Ellie Sattler: Paleobotanist and consultant who traveled to John Hammond's original Jurassic Park.
- Jeff Goldblum as Dr. Ian Malcolm: Chaos theory mathematician, former consultant for Jurassic Park, and a key figure in the San Diego incident depicted in The Lost World: Jurassic Park (1997).
- DeWanda Wise as Kayla Watts: Former US Air Force pilot who aids Owen and Claire on their mission.
- Mamoudou Athie as Ramsay Cole: Head of communications of Biosyn Genetics and Lewis Dodgson's delegate. Secretly allied with Ian Malcolm and his friends to bring Dodgson down.
- Isabella Sermon as Maisie Lockwood: Genetic descendant of Sir Benjamin Lockwood's daughter, Charlotte, whom he raised as his granddaughter, under the care of Owen and Claire. A troubled, courageous and resourceful 14-year-old mentored by Owen in understanding animal behavior, she helps dinosaurs who enter human settlements. Sermon also plays the young Charlotte Lockwood, and Elva Trill plays her as an adult.
- Campbell Scott as Dr. Lewis Dodgson: Biosyn's multi-billionaire CEO who masterminds the abductions of Maisie and Beta and hires Soyona Santos and Henry Wu to sell dinosaurs to the black markets and breed a swarm of giant hybrid locusts. Scott replaces Cameron Thor from Jurassic Park (1993).
- BD Wong as Dr. Henry Wu: Lead geneticist of the dinosaur-cloning programs at Jurassic Park and Jurassic World. Maisie's late mother was one of his colleagues.
- Omar Sy as Barry Sembène: Former animal trainer who worked with Owen at Jurassic World and is now a French Intelligence agent.
- Justice Smith as Franklin Webb: Former Jurassic World technician and dinosaur rights activist.
- Daniella Pineda as Dr. Zia Rodriguez: Paleo-veterinarian and dinosaur-rights activist.

Scott Haze also appears as Rainn Delacourt, a poacher who captures Maisie and Beta for Biosyn; Dichen Lachman appears as Soyona Santos, a dinosaur smuggler; Kristoffer Polaha appears as Wyatt Huntley, a CIA officer working undercover as one of Delacourt's men; Caleb Hearon appears as Jeremy Bernier, a CIA analyst; Freya Parker appears as Denise Roberts, a Biosyn employee; Varada Sethu appears as Shira, a Fish & Wildlife officer, and Dimitri "Vegas" Thivaios appears as a Maltese mercenary. OutsideXbox's Jane Douglas appears in a cameo role as a Biosyn scientist.

== Production ==
=== Development ===
During early conversations about Jurassic World (2015), executive producer Steven Spielberg told director Colin Trevorrow that he was interested in having more films made. In April 2014, Trevorrow announced that sequels to Jurassic World had been discussed. He said that they wanted to create something "less arbitrary and episodic", which could "potentially arc into a series that would feel like a complete story". Later, when Trevorrow was asked how much planning he had put into a trilogy while he was filming Jurassic World in 2014, he replied that he knew where the story would end. He said that planning the beginning, middle and end of the trilogy "is crucial to a franchise like this if you really want to bring people along with you and make sure they stay interested. It needs to be thought through on that level. It can't be arbitrary [...] The earlier Jurassic Park movies had pretty clear definitive endings. They were much more episodic."

In May 2015, Trevorrow expressed his desire to have other directors work on future films, believing they could bring different qualities to the series: "I think this is one of those franchises—like Mission: Impossible, and like what they're currently doing with Star Wars—that is going to really benefit from new voices and new points of view. […] Down the line, looking at the way that franchises have been working, I'm pretty confident this is the right answer for this one. We need to keep it new and keep it changing and constantly let it evolve." He said that the series would not always be about a dinosaur theme park, and future films could explore the concept of dinosaurs and humans coexisting.

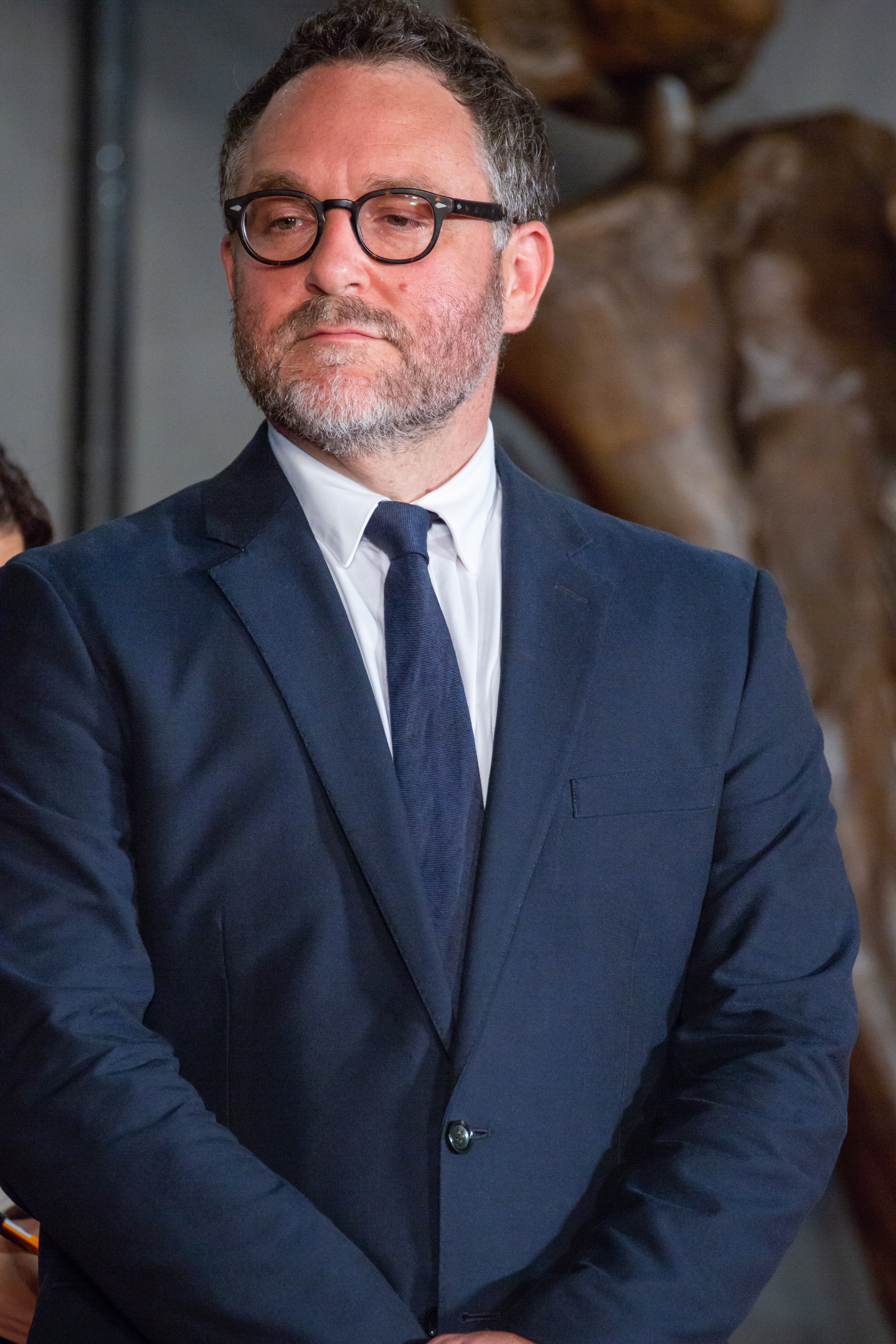
Colin Trevorrow returned from previous films as director, co-writer, and executive producer

Jurassic World producer Frank Marshall confirmed plans for a third Jurassic World film later in 2015, and Universal Pictures chair Donna Langley said that Trevorrow and Spielberg had a story idea for the film. Chris Pratt, who played Owen in Jurassic World, was signed for future films in the series. Trevorrow said that the friendship in Jurassic World between Owen and Barry (played by Omar Sy) could continue into the sequels. He also said that Bryce Dallas Howard's character, Claire, would evolve the most during the Jurassic World trilogy.

=== Pre-production ===
Universal announced in February 2018 that the untitled film, known then as Jurassic World 3, would be released on June 11, 2021. It was also announced that Trevorrow would write the script with Emily Carmichael, based on a story by Trevorrow and writing partner, Derek Connolly (who worked with him on the scripts for the previous Jurassic World films). Like the previous films, Marshall and Patrick Crowley would be producers and Trevorrow and Spielberg would return as executive producers.

A month after the announcement, Trevorrow was also confirmed as director. J. A. Bayona had directed the previous installment, Jurassic World: Fallen Kingdom; Trevorrow was inspired by Bayona's work on the film, saying that it "made me want to finish what we started." Spielberg had also asked Trevorrow to return as director.

Trevorrow had been set to direct Star Wars: Episode IX before leaving the project in September 2017. Episode IX was the finale of the Star Wars sequel trilogy, and Trevorrow described it as a "practice run" for Jurassic World Dominion, also considered a finale film. He used his experience from the Star Wars project and was also joined by several of its crew members. Legendary Entertainment co-financed the two previous films but was not involved with the third, since its five-year contract with Universal expired in 2018.

=== Writing ===
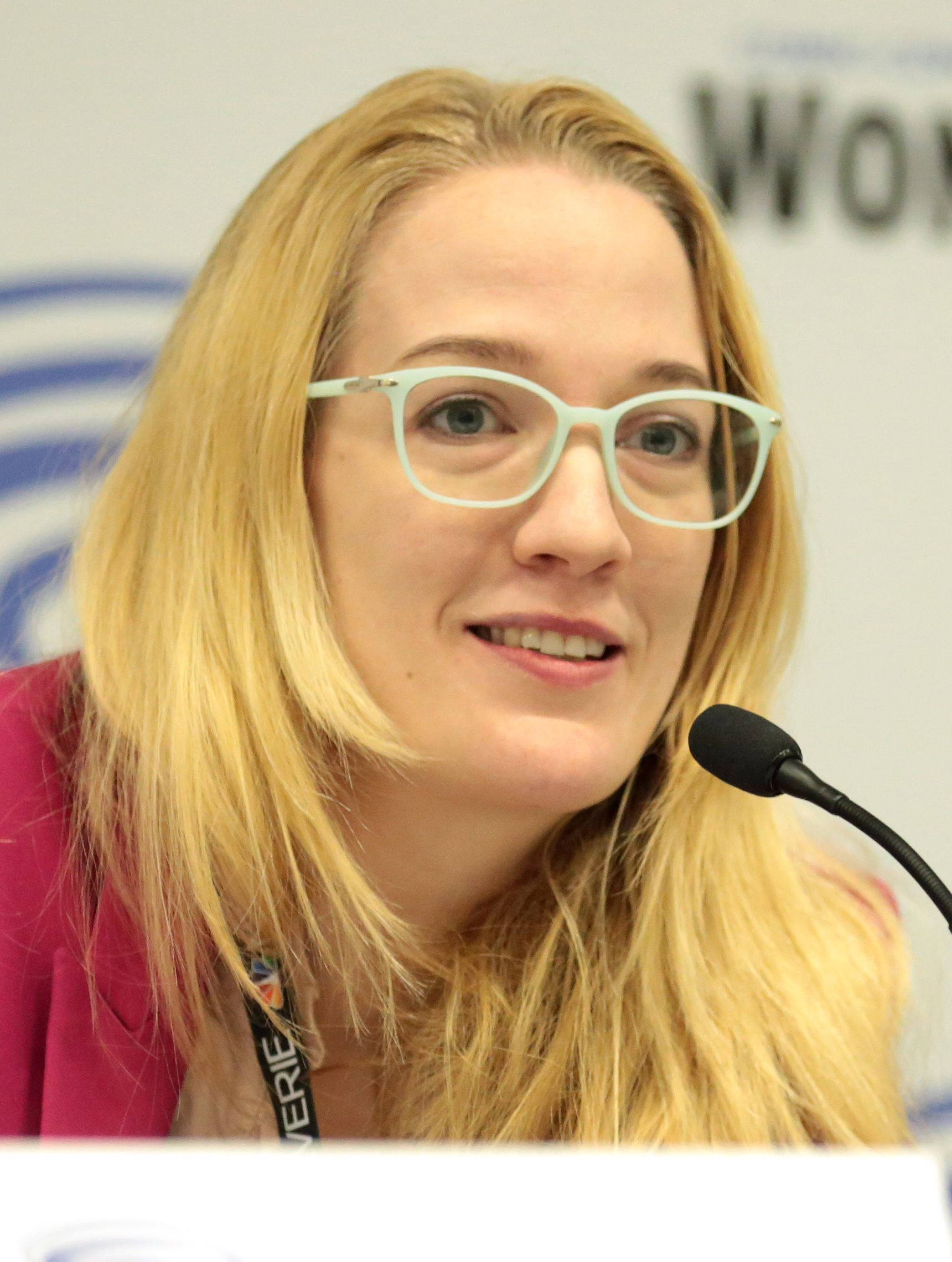
Emily Carmichael co-wrote the script with Trevorrow

Trevorrow met Carmichael in 2015, after seeing a short film of hers. Impressed with Carmichael's writing on Pacific Rim Uprising (2018) and a remake of The Black Hole, he chose her to co-write Jurassic World 3. Trevorrow and Carmichael were writing the script in April 2018. Trevorrow said that the third film would be a "science thriller", describing it as the Jurassic World film which would most closely match the tone of Jurassic Park (1993). He said about the third film and its predecessors, "I have a dinosaur movie that I've always wanted to see, and it took two movies to earn it." Trevorrow later described the film as a "celebration of everything that has existed in the franchise up until now", and compared it to the Jason Bourne and James Bond films.

During the development of Jurassic World: Fallen Kingdom in 2015, Trevorrow said that that film's storyline could involve dinosaurs becoming open-source: a number of entities around the world could create their own dinosaurs for a variety of purposes. Scenes and concepts about the integration of dinosaurs into the world were removed from the Fallen Kingdom script to be saved for the third film and to keep the second film's story focused. According to Bayona, "There were moments that we thought, this is more like a Jurassic [World] 3 scene so we took them out from the script. Some of those scenes we thought were better seen in a world where dinosaurs had spread all over the world. Colin, from time to time, came to me and said, 'I want this character to say that line because this is a moment that's referencing something I want to use in Jurassic 3'."

Trevorrow did not want to depict dinosaurs terrorizing cities, which he considered unrealistic. He wanted to honor Michael Crichton's novels Jurassic Park (1990) and The Lost World (1995), believing that humans and dinosaurs "battling it out in the city streets is a different kind of film than what he would've done". Trevorrow described a world where "a dinosaur might run out in front of your car on a foggy backroad, or invade your campground looking for food. A world where dinosaur interaction is unlikely but possible—the same way we watch out for bears or sharks. We hunt animals, we traffic them, we herd them, we breed them, we invade their territory and pay the price, but we don't go to war with them."

About the film's realism, Trevorrow said that dinosaurs would not be "everywhere all the time. I think any kind of global acceptance that they are just around doesn't feel real to me because, even now when you think of animals, when was the last time you saw a tiger walking down the street? We know there are tigers. We know they're out there. But to me, it's very important that we keep this grounded in the context of our relationship with wild animals today." For inspiration, he watched episodes of Planet Earth and alien-invasion films with a realistic perspective. Trevorrow said that his goal for the Jurassic World trilogy was to have a line from Claire in the first film ("No one is impressed by a dinosaur anymore") disproved in the final film.

With input from Carmichael and cast members, the film's storyline evolved from Trevorrow's initial vision. During production of the previous Jurassic World films, Howard kept a list of possible ideas for the final film (including a baby raptor and an underground dinosaur market in Malta). Trevorrow consulted the list while writing the script with Carmichael. He considered the Malta black market a departure from the dinosaur-auction scene in Fallen Kingdom: "I felt that what would really happen is a hive of scum and villainy. I wanted to see that".

The writers wanted Dr. Ellie Sattler, a paleobotanist in the Jurassic Park trilogy, to lead the story in Dominion. Trevorrow consulted scientists for story ideas, seeking to depict a global ecological crisis caused by genetic tampering which would be first noticed by a paleobotanist. He learned about Insect Allies (a DARPA program in which insects spread pesticides to crops), which inspired the film's locust plot. Trevorrow and Carmichael also consulted with screenwriters Michael Arndt and Krysty Wilson-Cairns, as well as David Koepp, who wrote the first two Jurassic Park films. Koepp and Wilson-Cairns each spent several weeks performing uncredited work on the script.

Trevorrow wanted the film to explore the idea of dinosaurs created by people other than Dr. Henry Wu. He said that Wu as the only person who knew how to create a dinosaur was far-fetched "after 30 years of this technology existing" in the films' universe. Biosyn, which appears in Crichton's novels but is absent from their film adaptations, debuts in Dominion. Trevorrow also wanted to see the return of Lewis Dodgson, a prominent character in the novels who appeared only briefly in the first Jurassic Park film.

Other returning characters from the original trilogy included Dr. Alan Grant and Dr. Ian Malcolm, rejoining Sattler. According to Trevorrow, striking a balance of screen time for the trio and the newer characters was the most difficult aspect of developing the script, with the convergence of storylines for the two character groups undergoing many revisions. Wu, who also appeared in the first film and the Jurassic World films, returned as well. Other characters from the series – including Lex and Tim Murphy and Kelly Curtis – were considered, but Trevorrow felt that the film had enough returning characters. Spielberg advised Trevorrow to remember the importance of the film's characters: "Don't forget that these are humans. These are real people, scientists, parents going through something spectacular, something fantastic".

=== Casting ===
In 2017, Laura Dern (who played Sattler in the Jurassic Park trilogy) expressed an interest in reprising her role, and was already in discussions by that time with the filmmakers. Trevorrow announced in April 2018 that Pratt and Howard would reprise their roles, along with other actors introduced in Fallen Kingdom. Later that year, Howard said her main desire for the film was to include more characters from the Jurassic Park trilogy, including Sattler and Malcolm (Jeff Goldblum). Trevorrow also suggested that Sam Neill could reprise his role as Grant.

In September 2019, Neill, Dern, and Goldblum were confirmed as returning in major roles. The film marks Neill and Dern's first appearances in the series since Jurassic Park III (2001). It is also the trio's first film appearance together since the original Jurassic Park film, although Goldblum briefly reprised his role in Fallen Kingdom. Goldblum and Neill had each starred in their own Jurassic Park sequel, but Trevorrow considered Dominion as Dern's film because its plot is partially driven by her character. Trevorrow collaborated with the three actors to ensure that their character portrayals would be consistent with previous films. He said that the film would answer questions about the characters: "Who are these people now? What do they make of the new world they're living in, and how do they feel about being part of its history?" Trevorrow, Dern and Neill agreed about having Grant and Sattler reunite romantically. Neill said that he would get into shape for his role by running.

Mamoudou Athie and DeWanda Wise were cast in lead roles in October 2019, without auditioning. Trevorrow was impressed by Athie's performance in The Front Runner (2018), and Wise was cast after Trevorrow saw her in the television series She's Gotta Have It. BD Wong would reprise his role as Wu from previous films, and Fallen Kingdom actors Justice Smith, Daniella Pineda and Isabella Sermon would also return.

In early 2020, Jurassic World actors Jake Johnson and Omar Sy were also set to return as their respective characters, Lowery and Barry, while Dichen Lachman and Scott Haze were cast as new characters. Campbell Scott was announced in June 2020 as Dodgson; the role, played by Cameron Thor in the original Jurassic Park, was recast for Jurassic World Dominion after Thor's imprisonment for sexual assault. Pratt compared Jurassic World Dominion to Avengers: Endgame (2019), another film in which he appeared; a number of characters returned to both from previous films. Andy Buckley (Scott Mitchell in Jurassic World) said that he had been signed to reprise his role, but his character was dropped in a rewrite.

=== Filming ===
On February 19, 2020, a production unit used drones to film aerial scenes at Cathedral Grove on Canada's Vancouver Island. Principal photography began in British Columbia on February 24, and the film's title was announced the following day as Jurassic World Dominion. Canadian filming ended in early March 2020. Production moved to England, where a major location was Pinewood Studios (the facility used for Fallen Kingdom). Filming was also done in Malta.

With a net budget of $552.3 million, Jurassic World Dominion is one of the most expensive films ever made. John Schwartzman was its cinematographer, returning to the position after working with Trevorrow on the first Jurassic World film and in the process, becoming the first person to serve as director of photography on two Jurassic Park films. Schwartzman had finished filming The Little Things in December 2019, leaving him only nine weeks to prepare for Jurassic World Dominion. He shot the film with 35mm film, 65mm film, and VistaVision; the previous film was shot entirely in the digital large format ARRI Alexa 65. Some night scenes were shot digitally to aid the visual effects team during post-production. For the majority of filming, Trevorrow preferred to avoid using multiple cameras simultaneously, and tried to avoid shooting scenes using standard camera coverage, instead having scenes play out in complete master shots. Second unit filming was directed by Dan Bradley.

Jurassic World Dominion was shot under the working title of Arcadia, the name of the ship which transported dinosaurs to the U.S. mainland in the previous film.

==== COVID-19 pandemic ====
Filming went on hiatus in March 2020 as a safety precaution due to the COVID-19 pandemic, and a decision about resuming production was originally expected within several weeks. During the delay, the filmmakers saved time by doing post-production work on footage already shot. Most of these scenes included dinosaurs, allowing the visual effects team to get started on the creatures.

Universal eventually confirmed that filming would resume in July 2020 at Pinewood Studios. The company planned to spend about $5 million on safety protocols, including thousands of COVID-19 tests for each cast and crew member (who would be tested before production resumed and several times during filming). A medical facility would be commissioned to perform the tests, and doctors and nurses would be on site during filming. The cast and crew would receive COVID-19 training, and the Pinewood set would include 150 hand-sanitizer stations and 1,800 safety signs to remind them of safety precautions such as social distancing. Walk-through temperature-testing stations would be built. All members of the production team would be required to wear masks, except for the actors during filming. The cast received a 109-page document outlining the safety protocols. The 750-person production team was divided into two groups, with the larger group consisting of crew members involved in construction, props, and other pre-filming activities. The smaller group consisted of Trevorrow, the cast, and essential crew members.

Filming resumed on July 6, 2020. The Langley Hotel, a luxury resort in Buckinghamshire, adjacent to Pinewood, was rented by Universal for the remainder of the shoot, serving as a protective "bubble" for the cast and crew. Both groups quarantined at the hotel for two weeks before filming resumed, and afterwards were allowed to roam the hotel without social distancing or mask-wearing. The actors and hotel employees were tested three times a week. Renting the hotel, combined with the COVID-19 precautions, convinced the cast that it would be safe to resume filming. Trevorrow encouraged the actors to make suggestions regarding their characters. He and the cast formed a close relationship while they lived together for four months, allowing them to create the characters "in a way that I never would have had the opportunity to do" if not for the pandemic protocols. The safety measures cost approximately $9 million, including the hotel. Jurassic World Dominion was one of the first major films to resume production during the pandemic and was an example to other major productions on how to resume. Universal considered the film ideal to resume; it required few real locations outside of the studio sets and had a relatively small cast and few extras. The earlier start of filming in England also made it easier to resume.

Neill, Dern and Goldblum began filming in early August. By that time, four crew members in England had tested positive for COVID-19; another four tested positive in Malta after arriving there before production. The main crew was scheduled to shoot in Malta with Pratt, Howard and Neill, although these plans were canceled after an increase in COVID-19 cases. As a result of the increase, the United Kingdom added Malta to its list of countries from which arrivals must quarantine for 14 days. Scenes set in Malta were rewritten by Trevorrow, and sets were reconfigured to continue the filming. The actors were no longer part of the Malta shoot, which was handled by a second unit directed by Bradley. Filming in Malta began at the end of August, and continued into September. After Malta, filming continued at Pinewood Studios.

Because of the rescheduling caused by the pandemic, Trevorrow and Johnson struggled to find an ideal time in the actor's schedule for filming. Johnson ultimately had to drop out of the project because of quarantine and travel restrictions which prevented him from reaching the set. Pineda appears early in the film, and was meant to film a later scene as well, but quarantine restrictions interfered. Varada Sethu was signed to replace her in the later scene as a different character.

Filming was slowed on October 7, after several people tested positive for COVID-19. Although the individuals later tested negative, the film's safety protocols required a two-week quarantine. During the partial shutdown, the main cast members continued to film secondary scenes before full production resumed later in the month. Shooting ended on November 7, after nearly 100 days. Like the previous films, Spielberg was minimally involved during filming; COVID-19 protocols would have prevented him from visiting the set.

==== Locations and sets ====
Trevorrow wanted the film to take place in locations not previously featured in the series, including Malta and the Dolomites. Location shooting was preferred to sets, and blue screens were rarely used. Jurassic World Dominion is the first film in the franchise with dinosaurs in a snowy environment. Some scenes, set in the Sierra Nevada, were filmed in British Columbia during a snowy winter. Merritt was among the British Columbia locations, which included its downtown and a lumber yard. In an early scene, Owen and others ride horses to herd a group of Parasaurolophus. For years, Trevorrow had wanted to introduce such a scene (also filmed in British Columbia). It was influenced by the 1969 film The Valley of Gwangi and 1960s and 1970s Western films set in snowy landscapes.

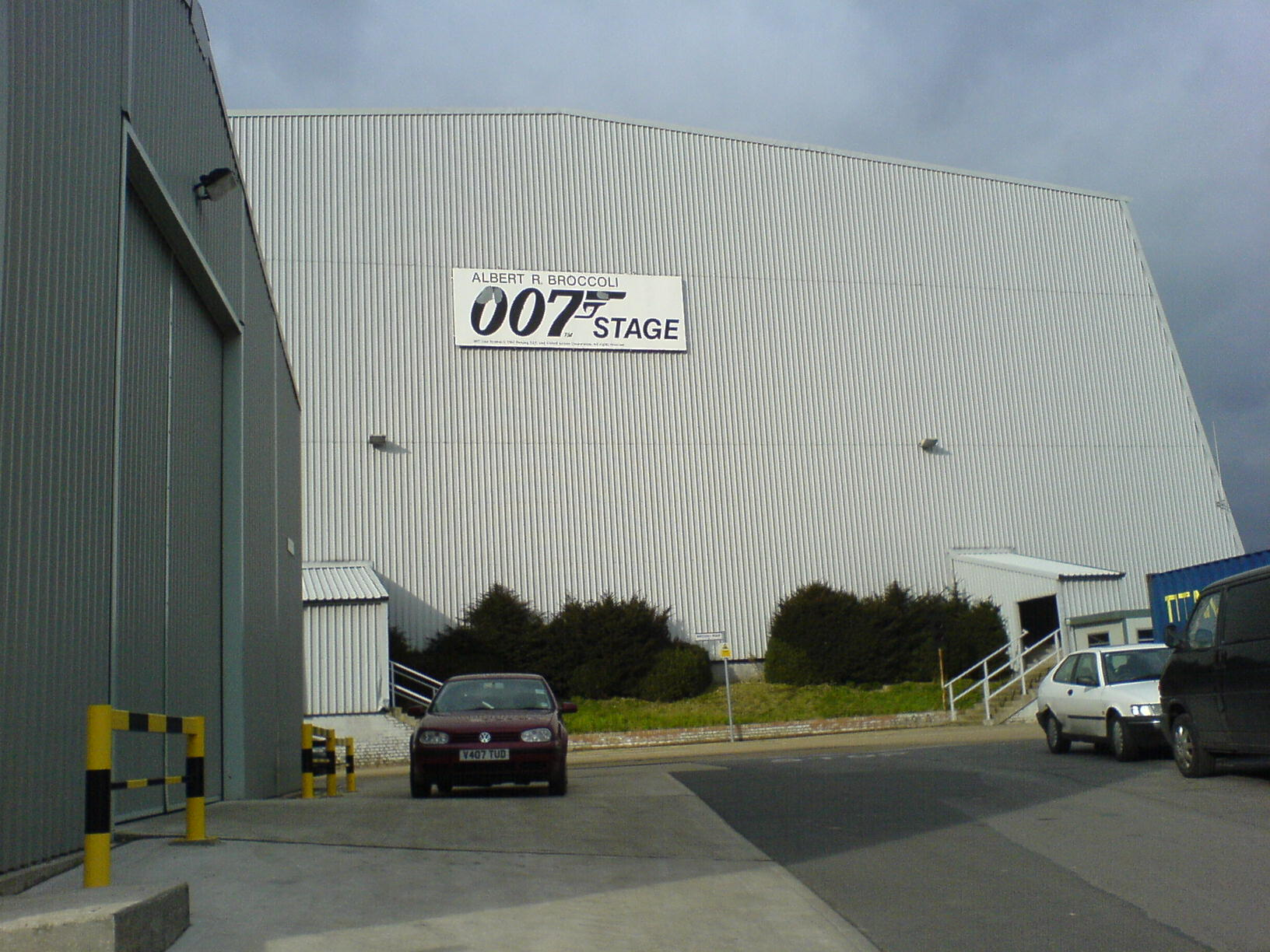
Filming locations included the 007 Stage at Pinewood Studios

Filming at Pinewood Studios included the 007 Stage, where large sets were assembled. A total of 112 sets were built for the film, including the black market. Another set was the interior of Kayla's C-119 cargo plane, and a miniature plane was used for exterior shots.

Other filming locations in England included Hawley Common, where part of the previous film was shot. Filming in Hawley Common and Minley Woods was done over three nights, with helicopter filming on the final night. These locations were used for a drive-in-theater scene with a T. rex which was cut from the film's theatrical version. Winterfold Forest was used for some scenes set in the Sierra Nevada, including Owen and Claire's cabin. Another scene was shot at a farm near Aylesbury, used as a Texas farm where Ellie Sattler investigates the locust outbreak.

Several locations were used for Biosyn headquarters, including Blavatnik School of Government and Wolfson College (both part of the University of Oxford). A lecture hall at Wolfson was used for a scene introducing Malcolm as he makes a speech. Black Park, adjacent to Pinewood Studios, was used for Biosyn's exterior along with two British Columbia locations: Cathedral Grove and the town of Squamish. Switzerland's Grande Dixence Dam and its surrounding mountains were digitally scanned during wintertime and recreated in the film as a frozen Biosyn dam. Kayla's crashed plane in the frozen lake was an exterior set at Pinewood, and the distant mountains in the background were added with blue screens. The Dolomites mountains were also scanned and added into the film. Biosyn's locust lab was a set, which Dodgson eventually sets afire. Trevorrow had planned to use special effects for the fire but agreed to burn down the set at the suggestion of special-effects supervisor Paul Corbould. Eight or nine cameras filmed the set as it burned.

Filming in Malta included Valletta, its capital. Malta was chosen as a location after the country's film commission presented financial incentives in April 2019 in the hope of attracting the project to the area. Trevorrow also chose it because he wanted to see "dinosaurs around old stones, around something that's ancient to us, just to illustrate how much more ancient these things are". Because Pratt and Howard could not travel to Malta, they were filmed with stunt doubles and their faces were added digitally during post-production. Valletta's streets were scanned with lidar, allowing Pratt and Howard to act against a blue screen of the city.

In a Valletta chase sequence, an Atrociraptor pack pursues Claire across rooftops while Owen flees the dinosaurs on motorcycle. Trevorrow's inspiration for this came from a car chase sequence in the 1998 film Ronin. Shooting the Valletta chase was complicated, and required up to nine cameras filming simultaneously. Trevorrow and Bradley had worked closely to design the sequence. Pratt filmed his part of the chase in a UK blue-screen studio, riding a stationary bike on a treadmill. A car-crash scene was filmed in the town of Floriana. Malta is portrayed as itself in the film except for Mellieħa, which depicted part of Grant's dig site in Utah.

=== Creatures on screen ===
Jurassic World Dominion features 35 dinosaur species. The film used 18 animatronic dinosaurs of various sizes, more than the previous Jurassic World films. They were created by designer John Nolan. Partial animatronics and puppetry were also used. Like the previous films, Industrial Light & Magic (ILM) worked on CGI versions of the animals. Animatronics and puppets were used for close-ups with humans, and CGI was used for certain movements. ILM scanned miniature clay maquettes of each dinosaur to create a digital version, which was then given to Nolan's team to create the dinosaurs.

Paleontologist Jack Horner, a longtime advisor for the series, returned for Dominion. Paleontologist Stephen L. Brusatte was also a consultant. Trevorrow wanted to strike a balance between realism and "awesome-movie-scary". Jurassic Park III had featured Velociraptors with quills along the head, but Dominion (and a five-minute prologue) introduces feathered dinosaurs to the series. Within the previous films' storyline, the dinosaurs were created by InGen and partially engineered with frog DNA to explain inaccuracies in their appearance. In Dominion, feathered dinosaurs are introduced with advanced methods by Biosyn. Pyroraptor and Therizinosaurus are among the feathered dinosaurs introduced in the film, as well as a feathered T. rex in the prologue. Nolan and ILM researched to accurately simulate feathers. Trevorrow intended the Therizinosaurus encounter with Claire to be a "quiet and still and suspenseful" scene, more similar to the original Jurassic Park than the action scenes in the Jurassic World trilogy. He noted that Claire "never really had even one sequence where it was just her alone with a dinosaur".

The film's dinosaur antagonist is a Giganotosaurus, which Trevorrow saved for the trilogy's final installment, setting up a rivalry with a T. rex from previous films. He said about the Giganotosaurus, "I wanted something that felt like the Joker. It just wants to watch the world burn". The showdown between the dinosaurs was written by Trevorrow; he filmed it primarily from the humans' perspective, hoping it would "make it feel like it was actually happening to you". An animatronic Giganotosaurus was created, which Nolan said was "probably the biggest challenge" for his team. The dinosaur was expected to take six months to build, but his team only had about four months to finish it. Trevorrow wanted to reuse an animatronic created for Fallen Kingdom for the T. rex, but it had deteriorated (common with animatronics).

Dimetrodon, a synapsid which existed before the dinosaurs, also appears in the film. Although the creature had appeared in franchise merchandise over the years, Dominion was its film debut. Another new creature is the Atrociraptor, which Trevorrow described as brutish compared to Velociraptors. Hybrid dinosaurs had prominent roles in the earlier Jurassic World films, but none appear in Dominion because Trevorrow felt that the concept had "narratively run its course". Among the returning dinosaurs is Dilophosaurus, appearing for the first time since the original Jurassic Park film. (Note: Dilophosaurus appeared as a hologram in Jurassic World (2015) and as a diorama in Jurassic World: Fallen Kingdom (2018).) Like the first film, no CGI was used to create the Dilophosaurus (the only dinosaur in the film without a digital model). Nolan created animatronic locusts 30 inches (76 centimetres) in length.

ILM's special effects supervisor, David Vickery, praised Bradley's second-unit work in Malta, calling it "very fast, very shaky, very frenetic, a lot of energy", but said also that such a style "goes against everything you're trying to do in visual effects." Speaking further about the Malta sequence, he noted that "creatures in broad daylight and direct sunlight is a very difficult thing to do."

=== Post-production ===
After filming ended, Trevorrow worked on post-production in a converted barn behind his UK home. The film's release had been delayed for a year due to the pandemic, allowing Trevorrow time to work on visual effects, sound mixing, and scoring as separate processes (unlike most films). When the visual effects were almost done, he screened the nearly-finished film for friends and Jurassic Park fans to obtain feedback and make improvements. Trevorrow said that it was a "much more involved process with the audience this time". In total, the film contains 1,450–1,500 visual effects shots.

The film was completed on November 6, 2021. With a runtime of two hours and 26 minutes, it is the longest film in the Jurassic Park series. It was initially two hours and 40 minutes, prompting concern from the studio about whether moviegoers would watch such a long film during a pandemic. Trevorrow then worked to shorten the theatrical cut to under 2 1/2 hours, although he expressed interest in releasing a director's cut with the deleted footage.

About 14 minutes were removed from the theatrical cut, including five minutes which were released online as a prologue. Other deleted scenes include a fight between an Oviraptor and a Lystrosaurus in the black market and a two-minute confrontation between Ramsay and Dodgson. The home-media release includes an extended cut with the deleted scenes restored; Trevorrow preferred the extended version, his original vision of the film.

== Music ==
The film's music was composed by Michael Giacchino, who scored the previous Jurassic World films. It was recorded at England's Abbey Road Studios over a 10-day period which ended in May 2021. Like his previous Jurassic World scores, Giacchino incorporated themes from John Williams's earlier Jurassic Park soundtracks. The score, distributed by Back Lot Music, was digitally released on June 3, 2022, and physically released three weeks later.

== Marketing ==
A five-minute preview of the film was released in June 2021 with IMAX screenings of F9. Trevorrow had intended for the footage to be the film's first five minutes before removing it from the theatrical cut. The footage was posted online on November 23, 2021, as a standalone short film and prologue for Jurassic World Dominion. It is also included in the film's extended home media release. The prologue, which includes a Cretaceous segment where a Giganotosaurus kills a T. rex in battle, establishes the main film's rivalry between the cloned dinosaurs.

Universal partnered with Olympians Mikaela Shiffrin, Nathan Chen, and Shaun White, who appeared in commercials promoting the film and the 2022 Winter Olympics. In the ads, each athlete has a dinosaur encounter in a snowy environment.

The first trailer was released online on February 10, 2022, four months before the film's release and later than those for previous Jurassic World films. It was also broadcast during Super Bowl LVI, and received 86 million views on social media websites during the 24 hours after it aired – nearly three times the post-Super Bowl traffic of Jurassic World: Fallen Kingdom. A second trailer was released on April 28. Universal established an in-universe website for the fictional Department of Prehistoric Wildlife (DPW) a month before the film's release. The site showcases video and image sightings of dinosaurs around the world. The site's content was created by an eight-person team, including Jack Ewins, who worked on promotional websites for the previous Jurassic World films. An exhibit in London's Trafalgar Square several weeks before the film's release included an interactive billboard with the Giganotosaurus, which reacted to people passing by.

Mattel and The Lego Group sold toys based on the film, as did Funko and Bandai's Tamagotchi. An expansion pack tied into the film was released for the video game Jurassic World Evolution 2 shortly after its theatrical premiere. The Smithsonian Institution produced educational products based on the film. Barbasol released limited-edition cans of its shaving cream with design work featuring dinosaurs from the film. Jeep, several of whose vehicles appeared in Dominion, aired a dinosaur-themed commercial as a tie-in to the film. Other promotional partners included CKE Restaurants and Ten Thousand Villages. All-in-all, Universal spent $145 million marketing the film.

== Release ==
=== Theaters ===
Jurassic World Dominion premiered in Mexico City on May 23, 2022, and began its theatrical rollout on June 1 in Mexico and South Korea. In the United States, Dominion was released theatrically by Universal Pictures on June 10; its scheduled release on June 11, 2021, was delayed by the pandemic.

=== Home media ===
The film was released for digital purchase and rental on July 14, 2022 and was released on 4K Ultra HD, Blu-ray and DVD on August 16. Its home video release includes an extended version of Jurassic World Dominion with the 14 minutes of cut footage restored, bringing the total runtime to 160 minutes.

In the United States, the theatrical and extended versions debuted on Universal's Peacock website on September 2, 2022, as part of an 18-month deal for Universal's live-action films, in which the film will move to Amazon Prime Video for 10 months before returning to Peacock for a final four months. After the 18-month deal, it will air on Starz as part of Universal's Post Pay-One licensing agreement with the network.

In Europe, the movie made its television premiere over the course of December 2022 and January 2023 through Sky in the UK, Italy and Germany, Canal+ in France and Movistar Plus+ in Spain. The movie also became available for streaming on SkyShowtime in Portugal on January 22, 2023, and was a launch title for the service in Central and Eastern Europe on February 14, 2023. The movie was released on Netflix on January 1, 2023, in Australia.

== Reception ==
=== Box office ===
Jurassic World Dominion grossed $376.9 million in the United States and Canada, and $626.8 million in other territories, for a worldwide total of $1.004 billion, making it the third-highest-grossing film of 2022. It was the 50th film to pass the billion-dollar mark, and was the fourth Jurassic film and the third film released during the COVID-19 pandemic to achieve this feat (after Spider-Man: No Way Home and Top Gun: Maverick). Deadline Hollywood calculated the film's net profit as $229.7 million, accounting for production budgets, marketing, talent participations, and other costs; box office grosses and home media revenues placed it sixth on their list of 2022's "Most Valuable Blockbusters". Forbes calculated the theatrical net profit for Universal to be $34.6 million.

In the U.S. and Canada, the film made $59.55 million on its first day (including $18 million from Thursday night previews, just below the first Jurassic World's $18.5 million and above Fallen Kingdom's $15.3 million). Its debut earnings were $145.1 million, topping the box office. It was the best opening weekend for a non-superhero film during the pandemic, with Deadline Hollywood calling its performance "amazing" given its unfavorable critical reception and mediocre audience-exit scores. This was the fourth-highest opening weekend for a Universal film, behind its two predecessors and Furious 7 (2015). When it opened, it had the third-highest number of screens of any film, behind The Lion King (2019) and Top Gun: Maverick. The film earned $59.2 million in its second weekend (a drop of 59%), topping newcomer Lightyear to remain in first place. In its third weekend, it earned $26.7 million and fell to third place behind newcomer Elvis and Top Gun: Maverick. It ended its box office run as the fifth highest-grossing film of 2022 in this region.

Outside the U.S. and Canada, the film earned $55.7 million in 15 early offshore markets and $178 million in 72 markets during its second weekend. It added $76.1 million during its third weekend (topping the box office in countries experiencing heat waves such as the UK, France, and Germany), and another $43 million in its fourth. By the film's fifth weekend, it was the fourth Hollywood film since the start of the pandemic to pass the $800 million mark. Worldwide IMAX earnings totaled $53.5 million by October 2, 2022, with the top markets China ($157.6 million), Japan ($46 million), Mexico ($43 million), the United Kingdom ($42.9 million), and France ($29.5 million).

=== Critical response ===
On the review aggregator website Rotten Tomatoes, 29% of 406 critics' reviews are positive, with an average rating of 4.80/10. The website's consensus reads: "Jurassic World Dominion might be a bit of an improvement over its immediate predecessors in some respects, but this franchise has lumbered a long way down from its classic start." Metacritic, which uses a weighted average, assigned the film a score of 38 out of 100, based on 59 critics, indicating "generally unfavorable" reviews. It is the lowest-rated film of the series on both websites. Audiences polled by CinemaScore gave the film an average grade of "A−" on an A+ to F scale, while PostTrak reported that filmgoers gave it a 73% overall positive score, with 57% saying that they would definitely recommend it.

Michael Phillips of the Chicago Tribune gave the film two out of four stars, describing Dominion as the franchise's weakest entry, criticizing its dialogue and calling Owen and Claire "thinly conceived". For Rolling Stone, David Fear wrote that compared to the original Jurassic Park, "Dominion feels like a contractual obligation at best, and a D.O.A. attempt to wring one last drop out of an already depleted brand at worst." According to a Variety review, "Of the three Jurassic World movies, Dominion is the least silly and most entertaining. But that's not saying much. This 'stop to ask if they should' cycle's human characters were never especially interesting, and why should we trust Trevorrow to suddenly make them so?" The Jewish Chronicle critic Linda Marric gave the film two out of five stars and wrote, "Overall, and bar a few good performances, Dominion fails on almost all accounts by delivering a story that is too preposterous even for a franchise that has demanded that we suspend disbelief for the last 3 decades."

Mark Feeney of The Boston Globe wrote, "The movie has its moments, and the CGI really is fabulous, but this go-round feels fairly tired. It's also too long, and much of it is paced in a somewhat ... leisurely? ... fashion." For Tribune News Service, Katie Walsh praised the performances of newcomers DeWanda Wise and Mamoudou Athie and called the motorcycle chase scene "the film's best, and most innovative, set piece" but called Dominion "not exactly satisfying, lacking in true suspense, tension and the kind of thrilling spectacle that Spielberg so effortlessly mastered in the first Jurassic Park, a cinematic high that we'll be chasing forever".

Reactions to Grant, Malcolm, and Sattler's returns were particularly polarized. Bilge Ebiri of Vulture wrote, "While it's certainly nice to see Dern, Neill, and Goldblum play these people again, it'd be nicer if the script gave them well-written dialogue or placed them in interesting situations". Maggie Boccella of Collider praised their acting but was also critical of the writing. She stated that the trio "feel like aimless last-minute additions, like their presence only serves to remind audiences of how good things used to be". Ian Freer of Empire praised their return, stating that it "provides a sharp contrast" to Owen and Claire, the "relatively colourless heroes of the later trilogy". Mashable's Kristy Puchko felt that the trio were given little to do in the film. According to Johnny Oleksinski of the New York Post, "You'd think it would be nostalgic to see Dern, Neill and Jeff Goldblum together again, but they all act like old fogies, and they're written to sound like morons". Zoe Jordan of Screen Rant opined that the film "undermines the unique characteristics that define" the trio. David Crow, writing for Den of Geek, praised the romantic reunion between Grant and Sattler.

Several reviewers were also critical of the locust subplot. Chase Hutchinson of Collider wrote, "If you were expecting a story that actually grappled with what the impact of the dinosaurs would be on the world, then you are in for a big letdown". John Squires of Bloody Disgusting stated that Dominion "makes the bizarre decision to skirt around the issue presented in the final moments of Fallen Kingdom, instead jumping four years" and picking up in a world where dinosaurs are "little more than a minor nuisance" to humans. In contrast, Kimberly Terasaki of The Mary Sue stated that "the biggest threat to the world has never been the dinosaurs, but the technology and corporations that created them". Explaining his decision to feature the locusts, Trevorrow said that he "wanted to make a film about genetic power and its consequences".

The extended edition was met with slightly more positive reviews. Samantha Coley of Collider praised it for adding story depth and fixing "some clunky editing issues". John Orquiola of Screen Rant praised the extended edition for restoring the prologue sequence and more character moments. Mike Reyes of CinemaBlend said the extra 14 minutes improved the film by adding more context to certain scenes. Jesse Hassenger of Polygon recommended the extended edition but stated that the additional scenes "play to the movie's strengths and weaknesses — which is to say the dinosaur stuff is fun, and the human stuff is a bit half-assed".

=== Accolades ===
Award	Date of ceremony	Category	Recipient(s)	Result	Ref.
Saturn Awards	October 25, 2022	Best Science Fiction Film	Jurassic World Dominion	Nominated	
Saturn Awards	October 25, 2022	Best Special / Visual Effects	David Vickery	Nominated	
Chinese American Film Festival	November 8, 2022	Most Popular U.S. Film in China	Jurassic World Dominion	Won	
People's Choice Awards	December 6, 2022	Movie of 2022	Jurassic World Dominion	Nominated	
People's Choice Awards	December 6, 2022	Action Movie of 2022	Jurassic World Dominion	Nominated	
People's Choice Awards	December 6, 2022	Male Movie Star of 2022	Chris Pratt	Nominated	
People's Choice Awards	December 6, 2022	Action Movie Star of 2022	Chris Pratt	Nominated	
Visual Effects Society Awards	February 15, 2023	Outstanding Visual Effects in a Photoreal Feature	David Vickery, Ann Podlozny, Jance Rubinchik, Dan Snape, Paul Corbould	Nominated	
Visual Effects Society Awards	February 15, 2023	Outstanding Created Environment in a Photoreal Feature	Steve Ellis, Steve Hardy, Thomas Dohlen, John Seru (Biosyn Valley)	Nominated	
Annie Awards	February 25, 2023	Outstanding Achievement for Character Animation in Live Action Production	Jance Rubinchik, Alexander Lee, Rich Bentley, Antoine Verney Carron, Sally Wilson	Nominated	
Kids' Choice Awards	March 4, 2023	Favorite Movie	Jurassic World Dominion	Nominated	
Kids' Choice Awards	March 4, 2023	Favorite Movie Actor	Chris Pratt	Nominated	
Golden Raspberry Awards	March 11, 2023	Worst Actress	Bryce Dallas Howard	Nominated	
Golden Raspberry Awards	March 11, 2023	Worst Prequel, Remake, Rip-off or Sequel	Jurassic World Dominion	Nominated	
Golden Raspberry Awards	March 11, 2023	Worst Screenplay	Emily Carmichael, Colin Trevorrow, and Derek Connolly	Nominated	

== Sequel ==
Jurassic World Dominion concluded the second film trilogy and the storyline which began in the original trilogy, although Marshall did not rule out the possibility of future films. In January 2022, he said: "We're going to sit down, and we're going to see what the future is."

A new installment, Jurassic World Rebirth, began development by 2024. David Koepp, screenwriter of the first two Jurassic Park films, wrote the screenplay with Marshall and Crowley returning as producers. Gareth Edwards directed the film, which released on July 2, 2025 in the United States. It features an entirely new cast for the first time, as the studio opted for a fresh take on the franchise.

== See also ==
- List of films featuring dinosaurs
