= David Vickery =

British visual effects supervisor

- Occupation: Visual effects artist
- Years active: 2002-present

David Vickery is a British visual effects supervisor.

He has been nominated twice for an Oscar, the first time on 24 January 2012 for the film Harry Potter and the Deathly Hallows – Part 2 and the second time on 22 January 2026 for the film Jurassic World Rebirth.

Vickery joined Industrial Light & Magic in 2015 and has been involved in the visual effects of four of the Jurassic Park franchise's films: Jurassic World: Fallen Kingdom (2018), Jurassic World Dominion (2022), Jurassic World Rebirth (2025) and the 2019 short Battle at Big Rock.
