= Dinosaurs in Jurassic Park =

Dinosaurs in sci-fi media franchise

Promotional image for Jurassic World: Fallen Kingdom featuring multiple dinosaurs from the 2018 film; from left to right: Apatosaurus, Stygimoloch, Carnotaurus, Gallimimus, Stegosaurus, Tyrannaosuarus Rex, Velociraptor, Triceratops, Baryonyx, Brachiosaurus, and Sinoceratops.

Jurassic Park, later also referred to as Jurassic World, is an American science fiction media franchise. It focuses on the cloning of prehistoric animals (mainly non-avian dinosaurs) through ancient DNA extracted from mosquitoes that have been fossilized in amber. The franchise explores the ethics of cloning and genetic engineering and the morals behind de-extinction, commercialization of science, and animal cruelty.

The franchise began in 1990 with the release of Michael Crichton's novel Jurassic Park. A 1993 film adaptation, also titled Jurassic Park, was directed by Steven Spielberg. Crichton then wrote a sequel novel, The Lost World (1995), and Spielberg directed its film adaptation, The Lost World: Jurassic Park (1997). Additional films have been released since then, including Jurassic Park III in 2001, completing the original trilogy of films.

The fourth installment, Jurassic World, was released in 2015, marking the start of a new trilogy. Its sequel, Jurassic World: Fallen Kingdom, was released in 2018. Jurassic World Dominion, released in 2022, marks the conclusion of the second trilogy. A standalone sequel, Jurassic World Rebirth, was released in 2025. Two Jurassic World short films have also been released: Battle at Big Rock (2019) and a Jurassic World Dominion prologue (2021).

Theropod dinosaurs like Tyrannosaurus and Velociraptor have had major roles throughout the film series. Other species, including Brachiosaurus and Spinosaurus, have also played significant roles. The series has also featured other creatures, such as Mosasaurus and members of the pterosaur group, both commonly misidentified by the public as dinosaurs. The various creatures in the films were created through a combination of animatronics and computer-generated imagery (CGI). For the first three films, the animatronics were created by special-effects artist Stan Winston and his team, while Industrial Light & Magic (ILM) handled the CGI for the entire series. The first film garnered critical acclaim for its innovations in CGI technology and animatronics. Since Winston's death in 2008, the practical dinosaurs have been created by other artists, including Legacy Effects (Jurassic World), Neal Scanlan (Jurassic World: Fallen Kingdom), and John Nolan (Jurassic World Dominion and Jurassic World Rebirth).

Paleontologist Jack Horner has served as the longtime scientific advisor on the films, and paleontologist Stephen L. Brusatte was also consulted for Jurassic World Dominion and Jurassic World Rebirth. The original film was praised for its modern portrayal of dinosaurs. Horner said that it still contained many inaccuracies, such as not portraying dinosaurs as having colorful feathers, but noted that it was not meant as a documentary. Later films in the series contain inaccuracies as well, for entertainment purposes. This includes the films' velociraptors, which are depicted as being larger than their real-life counterparts. In addition, the franchise's method for cloning dinosaurs has been deemed scientifically implausible for a number of reasons.

== On-screen portrayals ==
The various creatures in the Jurassic Park and Jurassic World films were created through a combination of animatronics and computer-generated imagery (CGI). For each film, Industrial Light & Magic (ILM) has handled dinosaur scenes that required CGI. The company has studied large animals such as elephants and rhinos, for reference in designing the digital dinosaurs.

=== Jurassic Park films (1993–2001) ===
For the original 1993 film Jurassic Park, director Steven Spielberg wanted to use practical dinosaurs as much as possible. He chose special-effects artist Stan Winston to create animatronic dinosaurs for the film, after seeing his work on the Queen Alien in the 1986 film Aliens. Winston said the Queen was easy compared to a dinosaur animatronic: "The queen was exoskeletal, so all of its surfaces were hard. There were no muscles, no flesh, and there was no real weight to it. The alien queen also didn't have to look like a real, organic animal because it was a fictional character -- so there was nothing in real life to compare it to. There was just no comparison in the difficulty level of building that alien queen and building a full-size dinosaur". Winston's team spent much time perfecting the animatronics, which used metal skeletons powered by electric motors. They molded latex skin that was then fitted over the robotic models, forming the exterior appearance. Up to 20 puppeteers were required to operate some of the dinosaurs. After filming concluded, most of the animatronics were disassembled.

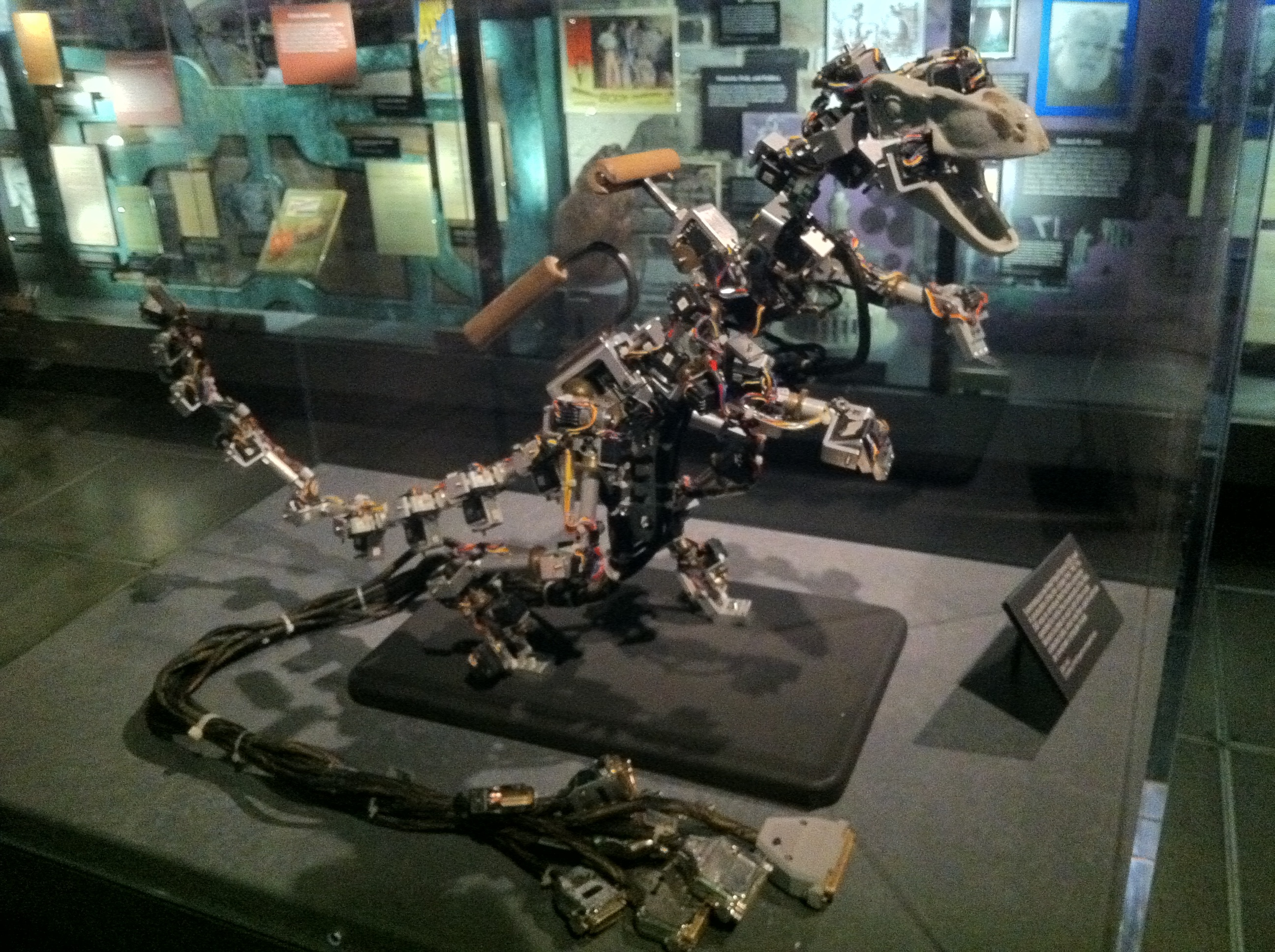
Dinosaur Input Device used in the first film

For certain scenes, Spielberg had considered using go motion dinosaurs created by visual-effects artist Phil Tippett. Spielberg was disappointed with the results and opted for ILM's digital dinosaurs instead, although Tippett and his team of animators remained with the project to supervise the dinosaur movements. Tippett and ILM worked together to create the Dinosaur Input Device (DID), a robot shaped like a dinosaur skeleton. The DID included an array of sensors that captured various poses, which were then transferred into graphics software at ILM. Animatics and storyboards by Tippett were also used by the film crew as reference for action sequences. ILM based their CGI dinosaurs on Winston's models. Herds of dinosaurs were created through computer animation, using duplicate individuals which were slightly altered to give the illusion of multiple animals. The 127-minute film has 15 minutes of total screen time for the dinosaurs, including nine minutes of animatronics and six minutes of CGI animals. Jurassic Park received critical acclaim for its innovations in CGI technology and animatronics. Among adults, the film generated an interest in dinosaurs, and it increased interest in the field of paleontology.

Winston and his team returned for the 1997 sequel, The Lost World: Jurassic Park, although the film relied more on CGI by ILM. The film features 75 computer-generated shots. While the first film showed that dinosaurs could be adequately recreated through special effects, the sequel raised the question of what could be done with the animals. Winston said, "I wanted to show the world what they didn't see in 'Jurassic Park': more dinosaurs and more dinosaur action. 'More, bigger, better' was our motto". Technology had not advanced much since the first film, although director Spielberg said that "the artistry of the creative computer people" had advanced: "There's better detail, much better lighting, better muscle tone and movement in the animals. When a dinosaur transfers weight from his left side to his right, the whole movement of fat and sinew is smoother, more physiologically correct". Besides animatronics, Winston's team also painted maquettes of dinosaurs that would subsequently be created through CGI.

Spielberg served as executive producer for each subsequent film. ILM and Winston returned for the 2001 film Jurassic Park III, directed by Joe Johnston. Winston's animatronics were more advanced than those used in previous films; they included the ability to blink, adding to the sense of realism. Animatronics were used for close-up shots. Winston's team took approximately 13 months to design and create the practical dinosaurs. The team also created dinosaur sculptures, which were then scanned by ILM to create the computer-generated versions of the animals.

=== Jurassic World films (2015–present) ===
Winston planned to return for a fourth film, which was ultimately released in 2015 as Jurassic World. Winston, who had been planning more-advanced special effects for the project, died in 2008 before the start of filming. Legacy Effects, founded by former members of Stan Winston Studios, provided an animatronic dinosaur for Jurassic World. Otherwise, the film's creatures were largely created through CGI, provided by ILM and Image Engine. New technology, such as subsurface scattering, allowed for greater detail in the creatures' skin and muscle tissue. According to Jurassic World director Colin Trevorrow, the film's animals were created from scratch because "technology has changed so much that everything is a rebuild". Some of the computer-generated creatures were created with motion capture, using human actors to perform the animals' movements. Jurassic World was the first dinosaur film to use motion capture technology. Trevorrow included several dinosaurs in the film that he had always felt were deserving of a prominent scene: "I didn't want to just throw the kitchen sink at it. Each of these movies has done a good job at just very carefully, in a measured way, increasing the new dinosaurs that you see".

ILM returned for the 2018 sequel, Jurassic World: Fallen Kingdom, which featured animatronics by special-effects artist Neal Scanlan. The film has more dinosaurs than any previous film, including several new ones not seen before. Fallen Kingdom also has more animatronic dinosaurs than any previous sequel, and the animatronics were more advanced than in previous films. Fallen Kingdom director J.A. Bayona said animatronics "are very helpful on set, especially for the actors so they have something to perform against. There's an extra excitement if they can act in front of something real".

Five animatronic dinosaurs were created for Fallen Kingdom, which features close interaction between humans and dinosaurs. Scanlan and his team of 35 people spent more than eight months working on the dinosaurs. Scanlan said animatronics were not best for every scene: "In some ways it will have an impact on your shooting schedule; you have to take time to film with an animatronic. In the balance, we ask ourselves if it is economically and artistically more valuable to do it that way, or as a post-production effect". Unlike the previous film, ILM determined that motion capture technology would not be adequate for depicting the dinosaurs in Fallen Kingdom.

The 2019 Jurassic World short film, Battle at Big Rock, utilized CGI and reference maquettes by ILM, and an animatronic by Legacy Effects.

Trevorrow returned as director for the 2022 film Jurassic World Dominion, which used more animatronics than the previous Jurassic World films. Approximately 18 animatronics of varying sizes were created, by John Nolan. The dinosaurs were designed by production designer Kevin Jenkins, who created miniature clay maquettes that were then scanned by ILM, which made alterations before sending the digital models to Nolan for 3D printing. In a departure from previous films, the dinosaurs were made of recyclable materials. ILM created 900 CGI dinosaur shots for Dominion, and also produced various CGI dinosaurs for the film's five-minute prologue, released in 2021.

The 2025 film Jurassic World Rebirth, directed by Gareth Edwards, had a limited pre-production period compared with previous installments. As a result, ILM had only six weeks to finalize new dinosaur designs. The limited production time meant that animatronics could not be heavily utilized, although on-set materials were still used to aid the actors. Nolan returned to create practical dinosaur parts, including heads and claws. These were then replaced with CGI during post-production, as Edwards wanted to maintain consistency on the dinosaur designs by avoiding an on-screen combination of production methods.

== Scientific accuracy ==
=== Premise ===
The franchise's premise involves the cloning of dinosaurs through ancient DNA, extracted from mosquitoes that sucked the blood of such animals and were then fossilized in amber, preserving the DNA. Later research showed that this would not be possible due to the degradation of DNA over time. The oldest DNA ever found only dated back approximately 1 million years, whereas non-avian dinosaurs died 66 million years ago. It is also unlikely that dinosaur DNA would survive a mosquito's digestive process, and fragments of DNA would not be nearly enough to recreate a dinosaur. In addition, the type of mosquito shown in the first film, Toxorhynchites rutilus, does not actually suck blood.

The premise presents other issues as well. Michael Crichton's 1990 novel Jurassic Park and its film adaptation both explain that gene sequence gaps were filled in with frog DNA, although this would not result in a true dinosaur, as frogs and dinosaurs are not genetically similar. Furthermore, the novel uses artificial eggs to grow the dinosaurs, while the film uses ostrich eggs, although neither would be suitable for development.

At the time of the first film's release, Spielberg said he considered the premise to be "science eventuality" rather than science fiction, although Crichton disagreed: "It never crossed my mind that it was possible. From the first moment of publication, I was astonished by the degree to which it was taken seriously in scientific circles". Microbiologists at the time also considered the premise to be implausible. The film's dinosaur consultant, paleontologist Jack Horner, said in 2018: "Even if we had dinosaur DNA, we don't know how to actually form an animal just from DNA. The animal cloning that we do these days is with a live cell. We don't have any dinosaur live cells. The whole business of having a dinosaur is a lot of fiction". Horner has instead proposed that a "Chickenosaurus" may be possible, by altering a chicken's DNA.

=== Dinosaurs ===
In creating Jurassic Park, Spielberg wanted to accurately portray the dinosaurs, and Horner was hired to achieve this goal. Tippett, a dinosaur enthusiast, also helped to keep the portrayals realistic. The film followed the theory that dinosaurs had evolved into birds, and it was praised for its modern portrayal of dinosaurs, although Horner said that there were still many inaccuracies. However, he noted that the film is not a documentary and said he was "happy with having some fiction thrown in", stating: "My job was to get a little science into Jurassic Park, but not ruin it". Spielberg sought to portray the dinosaurs as animals rather than monsters, which changed the public's perception of them, although the sequels would have a deeper focus on rampaging dinosaurs. Horner said that in reality, "visiting a dinosaur park would be like going to a wild animal park. As long as you keep your windows rolled up, nobody's going to bother you. But that doesn't make a very good movie".

Horner was involved throughout the production process. His consulting work included the supervision of the CGI dinosaurs, ensuring that they were life-like and scientifically accurate. Horner and Spielberg would discuss ways to combine scientific facts with fictional elements, the latter being for entertainment purposes. Horner said "if I could demonstrate that something was true or not true, then he would go with that, but if I had some question about it and we didn't really have much evidence about it, he would go with whatever he thought would make the best movie". Horner returned as a paleontological consultant for the next five films. For The Lost World: Jurassic Park, Spielberg largely followed Horner's advice regarding dinosaur accuracy, but some exceptions were made. Winston's team closely modelled the dinosaurs based on paleontological facts, or theories in certain cases where facts were not definitively known.

The scientific accuracy of the dinosaurs is referenced in Crichton's novel when Henry Wu, chief geneticist for the dinosaur theme park, notes that the animals are hypothetical reconstructions created with modified DNA. In Jurassic Park III, the character Dr. Alan Grant, a paleontologist, states that the resurrected dinosaurs are not authentic but rather are "genetically engineered theme park monsters". The film introduces a Velociraptor design featuring quills along the head. Aside from this, feathered dinosaurs have largely been absent from the series.

Before the release of Jurassic World, new research had shown that real dinosaurs were more colorful than they were in the films. Horner said that Spielberg "has made the point several times to me that colorful dinosaurs are not very scary. Gray and brown and black are more scary". Horner considered the colors to be the most inaccurate aspect of the films' dinosaurs. In addition, they are often depicting roaring, although paleontologists find this speculative or unrealistic. Horner said: "Dinosaurs gave rise to birds, and birds sing. I think most of the dinosaurs actually sang rather than growled".

Despite new discoveries, the sequels largely kept the earlier 1990s animal designs for continuity with the previous films. Paleontologists were disappointed with the outdated dinosaur portrayals in Jurassic World, including the lack of feathers, although they acknowledged that it is a work of fiction. Trevorrow said Jurassic World was not meant as a documentary film, but as a sci-fi film. The film itself includes a scene with Wu stating that any inaccuracies in the dinosaurs can be attributed to the fact that they are genetically engineered animals. Trevorrow noted that the dinosaurs in the franchise – going back to Crichton's novels Jurassic Park and The Lost World (1995) – were partially recreated with frog DNA, stating "those weren't 'real' dinosaurs, any of them". Tim Alexander, visual effects supervisor for ILM, said that colorful dinosaurs were excluded because they would look out of place in the film: "It's very forest greens and taupes and park rangers. And if we then throw a bright pink raptor in there, it's going to stick out and look a little weird".

For Jurassic World: Fallen Kingdom, ILM consulted with paleontologists and did extensive research to accurately depict the dinosaurs. Dinosaur expert John Hankla, of the Denver Museum of Nature and Science, served as an advisor on the film, and also provided several dinosaur fossil recreations for the film. Horner said that his own involvement on Fallen Kingdom was minimal. The film features more colorful dinosaurs than its predecessors.

Horner was consulted again for Jurassic World Dominion, and paleontologist Stephen L. Brusatte was also hired as a science consultant. Fully feathered dinosaurs are introduced in Jurassic World Dominion and its prologue. Brusatte returned for Jurassic World Rebirth, which does not include any feathered dinosaurs; Edwards thought they "looked like big chickens and weren't all that scary," according to David Vickery, ILM's visual effects supervisor.

== Table of appearances ==
Taxa	Jurassic Park trilogy			Jurassic World trilogy			Standalone sequel	Short films	
Taxa	Jurassic Park	The Lost World: Jurassic Park	Jurassic Park III	Jurassic World	Jurassic World: Fallen Kingdom	Jurassic World Dominion	Jurassic World Rebirth	Battle at Big Rock	Dominion prologue
Taxa	1993	1997	2001	2015	2018	2022	2025	2019	2021
Allosaurus					Yes			Yes	
Ankylosaurus			Yes						Yes
Anurognathus (Note: Not a dinosaur, but a different kind of prehistoric animal.)							Yes		
Apatosaurus				Yes					
Aquilops							Yes		
Atrociraptor						Yes			
Baryonyx					Yes				
Brachiosaurus	Yes		Yes		Yes				
Carnotaurus					Yes				
Ceratosaurus			Yes						
Compsognathus		Yes			Yes				
Corythosaurus			Yes						
Dilophosaurus	Yes					Yes			
Dimetrodon						Yes			
Dimorphodon				Yes		Yes			
Distortus rex (Note: Mutant dinosaur created for the films.)							Yes		
Dreadnoughtus						Yes			Yes
Gallimimus	Yes			Yes					
Giganotosaurus						Yes			Yes
Iguanodon						Yes			Yes
Indominus rex (Note: Hybrid dinosaur created for the films.)				Yes					
Indoraptor					Yes				
Lystrosaurus						Yes			
Mamenchisaurus		Yes							
Microceratus						Yes			
Moros						Yes			Yes
Mosasaurus				Yes					
Mutadon							Yes		
Nasutoceratops						Yes		Yes	
Oviraptor						Yes			Yes
Pachycephalosaurus		Yes		Yes					
Parasaurolophus	Yes								
Pteranodon		Yes							
Pyroraptor						Yes			
Quetzalcoatlus						Yes			Yes
Sinoceratops					Yes				
Spinosaurus			Yes				Yes		
Stegosaurus		Yes						Yes	
Stygimoloch					Yes				
Therizinosaurus						Yes			
Titanosaurus							Yes		
Triceratops	Yes								
Tyrannosaurus	Yes								Yes
Velociraptor	Yes								

== List of creatures ==
The following list includes on-screen appearances. Some animals listed here have also made prior appearances in the novels.

=== Ankylosaurus ===
Ankylosaurus first appears in Jurassic Park III, through brief appearances. It was created by ILM entirely through CGI.

Ankylosaurus returns in Jurassic World. It is among Trevorrow's favorite dinosaurs, and is one of several that he felt was deserving of a substantial scene. In the film, an Ankylosaurus is killed by the Indominus rex. Trevorrow called its death an example of moments "that are designed to really make these creatures feel like living animals that you can connect to. Especially since so many of the themes in the film involve our relationship with animals on the planet right now, I wanted them to feel real".

Ankylosaurus returns in each subsequent film.

=== Apatosaurus ===
In the novel Jurassic Park, Apatosaurus is the first group of dinosaurs seen on Isla Nublar. It is replaced by Brachiosaurus in the film adaptation. Apatosaurus also appears in the sequel novel The Lost World, but is absent from its film adaptation as well.

Apatosaurus makes its first film appearance in Jurassic World, with several individuals featured, including one depicted by an animatronic. Unlike earlier films which featured numerous animatronics, the Apatosaurus was the only one created for Jurassic World. Producer Patrick Crowley was initially hesitant to have an animatronic built because of the high cost, but Trevorrow persuaded him that fans of the series would enjoy it. The animatronic, built by Legacy Effects, consisted of a seven-foot (2.1 m)-long section of the dinosaur's neck and head. It was used for a close-up shot depicting the animal's death, after it had been attacked by the Indominus rex. Audio recordings of a Harris's hawk were used for the moans of the wounded Apatosaurus.

To animate the Apatosaurus, ILM used elephants as an example. Glen McIntosh, the animation supervisor for ILM, stated that "there are no existing animals that have such large necks, but in terms of the size and steps they're taking, elephants are an excellent example of that. Also the way their skin jiggles and sags. You also have impact tremors that rise up through their legs as they take steps". Originally, Legacy Effects only created a small model of the Apatosaurus for use in the film, but executive producer Steven Spielberg decided that a larger model would be better. The original model was scanned into a computer, allowing artists to create a larger 3-D model needed for the film. Apatosaurus makes appearances in the subsequent Jurassic World films.

=== Aquilops ===
Aquilops is introduced in Jurassic World Rebirth. John Nolan designed three animatronics for filming, each one measuring 18 inches in length and operated remotely by a team of puppeteers. The primary animatronic had numerous motors to simulate movements such as breathing, blinking, and tail wagging. This was used for close interactions with the cast, while another animatronic was used in scenes where characters pick the creature up, and a third was used for lighting reference. Because of their abundant use of 3D-printed parts, these puppets weighed less than typical animatronics.

=== Brachiosaurus ===
In the original Jurassic Park film, a Brachiosaurus is the first dinosaur seen by the park's visitors. The scene was described by Empire as the 28th most magical moment in cinema. In the novel, as well as Crichton's first drafts, the first dinosaur seen is instead an Apatosaurus, but Tippett suggested changing it to Brachiosaurus, which was larger. The film crew cut branches from high trees to mimic the Brachiosaurus eating tree branches, and the animation team carefully synced the animation of the dinosaur's bites with the branch cuts. A later scene depicts characters in a high tree, interacting with a Brachiosaurus. This scene required the construction of a 7.5-foot (2.3 m)-tall puppet that represented the animal's upper neck and head. Compared with fossilized remains, the puppet's head was roughly three times larger than its real-life counterpart. The film also inaccurately depicts the species as having the ability to stand on its hind legs, allowing it to reach high tree branches, and depicts the dinosaur as chewing its food, an idea that was added to make it seem docile like a cow. The shot of the dinosaur sneezing required four takes, as Richards was sprayed with a yellowish goo that had spinach in it. That scene included a matte painting by Christopher Leith Evans; it is the only scene in the film to use a matte painting. Whale songs and donkey calls were used for the Brachiosaurus sounds, although scientific evidence showed that the real animal had limited vocal abilities. Brachiosaurus appears again in Jurassic Park III, created by ILM entirely through CGI.

Brachiosaurus returns in Jurassic World: Fallen Kingdom, including a scene in which one individual is stranded on Isla Nublar and dies in a volcanic eruption. Director J. A. Bayona said this Brachiosaurus is meant to be the same individual first seen in the original Jurassic Park. For Fallen Kingdom, the Brachiosaurus was created using the same animations from the first film. The Brachiosaurus death was the last shot on the film to be finished. Bayona and the post-production team struggled to perfect the CGI, with only several days left to complete the scene. They worked through the final night to perfect the colors and composition, shortly before the film's release. Fans and film critics considered the death scene sad, with the latter describing it as "poignant" or "haunting", particularly given the species' role in the first film.

=== Compsognathus ===
Procompsognathus appears in the novels, but is replaced by Compsognathus in the film series.

Their first film appearance is in The Lost World: Jurassic Park. In the film, the character Dr. Robert Burke, a paleontologist, identifies the dinosaur as Compsognathus triassicus, which in reality is a non-existent species; the film combined the names of Compsognathus longipes and Procompsognathus triassicus. In the film, Compsognathus are depicted as small carnivorous theropods which attack in packs.

In Crichton's novels, the dinosaur is nicknamed "Compy" (plural: "Compies"), and this is used in the film series as well. Dennis Muren, the film's visual effects supervisor, considered Compsognathus the most complex digital dinosaur. Because of their small size, the Compies had their entire body visible onscreen and thus needed a higher sense of gravity and weight. A simple puppet of the Compsognathus was used in the film's opening scene, in which the dinosaurs attack a little girl. Later in the film, they kill the character Dieter Stark, who is played by Peter Stormare. For Stark's death scene, Stormare had to wear a jacket with numerous rubber Compies attached.

Compsognathus make brief appearances in all subsequent films, with the exception of Jurassic World. In the novels, Procompsognathus is depicted with the fictitious feature of a venomous bite, although such a trait is not mentioned regarding their onscreen counterparts until Jurassic World: Camp Cretaceous. Compsognathus returns in the 2022 film Jurassic World Dominion. A redesigned Compsognathus can be seen a number of times in Jurassic World Rebirth.

=== Dilophosaurus ===
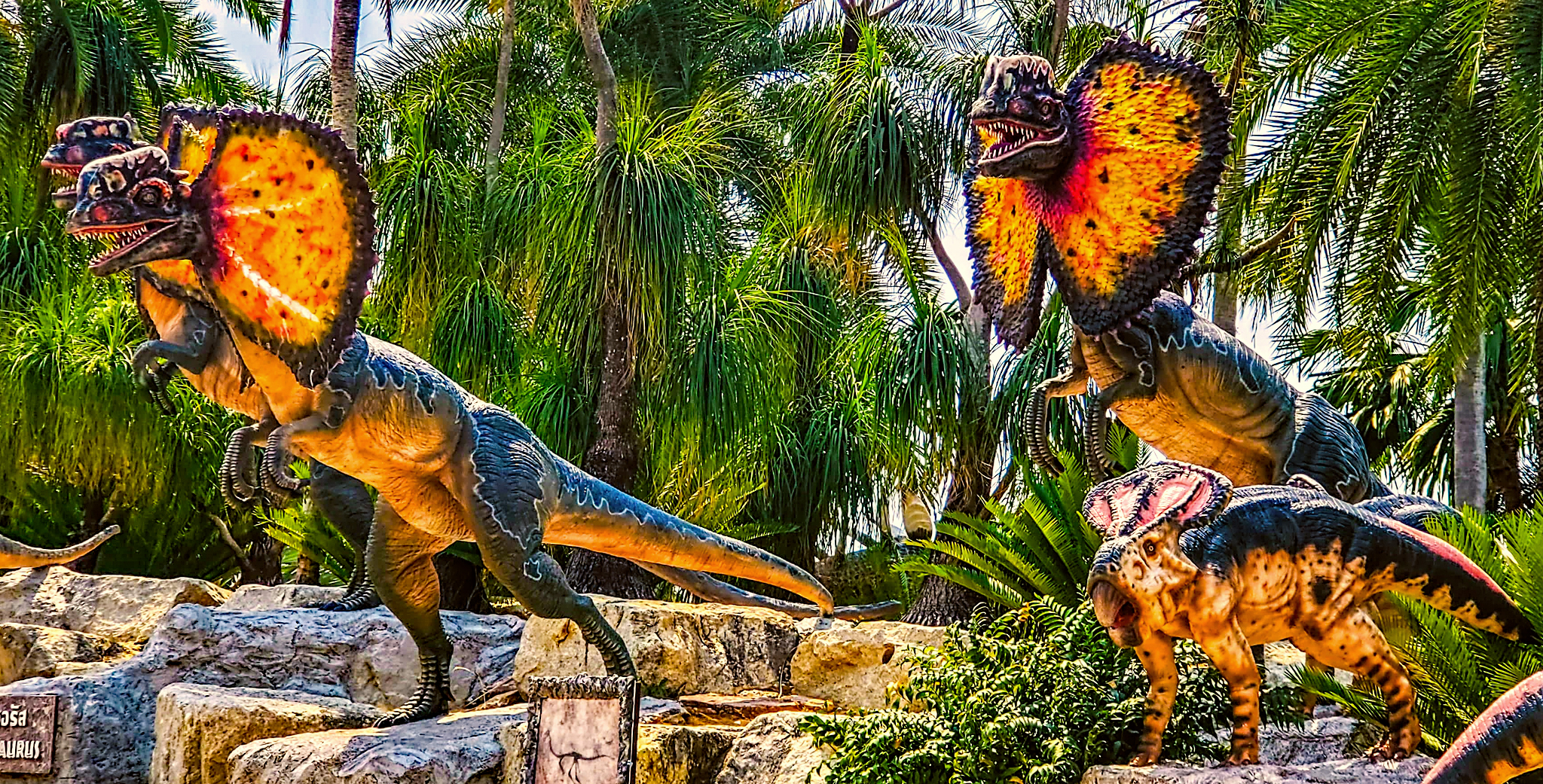
Dilophosaurus statues featuring the neck frill popularized by Jurassic Park

A fictionalized version of Dilophosaurus appears in the first novel and its film adaptation, both depicting it with the ability to spit venom. The film's Dilophosaurus also has a fictionalized neck frill that retracts, and the dinosaur was made significantly smaller to ensure that audiences would not confuse it with the Velociraptors. While the real Dilophosaurus was thought to have stood at around 10 feet (3.0 m), the animatronic was only four feet in height. In addition to the animatronic, a set of legs was also created for a shot in which the dinosaur hops across the screen. The animal was originally designed to walk, but is not shown walking in the final film due to technical difficulties. The weight of the head and thinness of the neck made it difficult to lift through puppetry, so the head was attached to a Steadicam rig. The Dilophosaurus scene was shot on a sound stage, and the animal's lower body was suspended from a catwalk with bungee cords. No CGI was used in creating the Dilophosaurus.

In both the novel and its film adaptation, a Dilophosaurus uses its venom on the character Dennis Nedry before killing him. The animatronic was nicknamed "Spitter" by Winston's team. A paintball mechanism was used to spit the venom, which was a mixture of methyl cellulose, K-Y Jelly, and purple food coloring. Spielberg had planned for the venom to be a yellow-green color, but decided on set that it looked too much like the pea soup in The Exorcist, so it was changed. The production staff then tried Ultra-slime mixed with black food coloring, but the water made the Ultra-slime lose its stickiness. The final concoction was then produced. The venom left a stain on Nedry actor Wayne Knight, causing problems when Knight went to film an episode of Seinfeld. The film's idea of a neck frill came from a suggestion by concept artist John Gurche. The idea for the frill was inspired by the frilled lizard, and it was made to be brightly colored because some animals use bright colors as a signal of danger. Because the head of the Dilophosaurus was too small to fit all the mechanics that the animatronic would need, three interchangeable heads were made; the first head had its frill retracted, the second could expand and retract the frill, and the third had an extended, vibrating frill and could spit venom. The heads took between 60 and 90 minutes to change, so Spielberg took the opportunity to shoot other scenes during the downtime. Spielberg framed the shot of the Dilophosaurus spitting in such a way that only the head is visible, which meant that the head could be used without being attached to the body. The dinosaur's vocal sounds are a combination of a swan, a hawk, a howler monkey, and a rattlesnake.

Spielberg initially believed that the Dilophosaurus would be the easiest dinosaur to film, although the scene proved harder to shoot that he had expected. The scene is set during a storm, and the use of water to simulate the rain resulted in complications for the animal's puppeteer. The water leaked into and filled up the puppeteer's box, drenching the puppeteer. The rushing water was so loud that the puppeteer was unable to hear Spielberg's directions, and the video monitor he used floated away, so he could not see what was happening either. A shot not included in the final film would have shown inflatable venom sacs, located under the animal's mouth. These would become visible as the dinosaur spits its venom, which would be expelled from the animatronic's mouth using compressed air. However, the atmosphere was cold and humid on-set, and the compressed air became visible under these conditions. Spielberg resolved the issue by cutting the scene to Nedry as the venom hits him, rather than showing it exiting the animal's mouth.

Dilophosaurus was popularized by its film appearance in Jurassic Park, but is considered the most fictionalized dinosaur in the film. Horner, in 2013, described Dilophosaurus as a good dinosaur to "make a fictional character out of, because I think two specimens are known, and both of them are really crappy. They're not preserved very well". Paleontologist Scott Persons later said that the Dilophosaurus is the most controversial dinosaur depiction in the film series.

Another scene, originating with production designer Rick Carter and eventually cut from the film, featured an umbrella emblazoned with a Dilophosaurus head with its frill expanded. The intended scene, which was to take place in the visitor center near the end of the film, featured Tim using the head on the umbrella, which he had retrieved from the visitor center's gift shop, to scare off a Velociraptor. The umbrella was also intended to have the ability to squirt water, imitating the dinosaur's venom-spitting ability. The scene was intended to demonstrate a way that the park would commercialize the dinosaurs.

In Jurassic World, a Dilophosaurus appears as a hologram in the theme park's visitor center. The dinosaur's venom is also referenced in a comedic park video featured in the film, in which tour guide Jimmy Fallon is paralyzed by it.

A living Dilophosaurus was intended to appear in Jurassic World: Fallen Kingdom, but the scene was never filmed, as director Bayona decided that it was not necessary. The scene, set on board the Arcadia ship, would depict the characters Owen and Claire encountering a Dilophosaurus in a cage. Bayona believed that the Arcadia scenes were long enough already. Dilophosaurus appears in Fallen Kingdom only as a diorama, on display at Benjamin Lockwood's estate.

Several Dilophosaurus individuals appear in Jurassic World Dominion, which marks the first living appearance since the original film. One individual has an encounter with Claire, and a trio of the animals later kill Lewis Dodgson. Like the first film, no CGI was used to depict the Dilophosaurus, the only animal on the film to lack a digital model. Instead, it was depicted with an animatronic controlled by 12 puppeteers. Although ILM had a digital version of the creature – previously used for its hologram appearance in Jurassic World – it was not detailed enough to inform Nolan's team in creating an animatronic version. As a result, Nolan scoured through scarce behind-the-scenes material from the first film, in an effort to match his animatronic with Winston's original. Trevorrow wanted Dilophosaurus to be seen walking, but because the animal is never shown doing so in the original film, Nolan consulted online images to determine the walking style. Nolan considered having a performer wear the Dilophosaurus puppet with the use of a harness, although it was found too heavy. As with the original film, methyl cellulose was used to create the venom, which was shot out by an off-screen technician.

A Dilophosaurus briefly appears in Jurassic World Rebirth attempting to scavenge from a dead Parasaurolophus and ward off one of the characters, only to be scared off by a slumbering Tyrannosaurus.

=== Dimetrodon ===
Dimetrodon is a synapsid which existed before the dinosaurs, although it is often mistaken for one. The creature appears as a diorama model in Jurassic World: Fallen Kingdom, along with other animals. Production designer Andy Nicholson included Dimetrodon due to its popularity, especially among Jurassic Park fans. The animal had made numerous appearances in franchise merchandise over the years, including toys, comic books, and video games.

A group of living Dimetrodon appear in Jurassic World Dominion. Originally, Nolan's team was only budgeted to sculpt a Dimetrodon head. However, lead sculptor David Darby continued to add on to the creature. According to Nolan, Darby "sort of got carried away and put the neck on in and then added legs and added the body". The nearly finished creature, minus a tail, remained within budget. The head sculpt was adjusted in accordance with feedback from Spielberg, who requested slight changes. It was the only creature in Dominion to receive direct input from him.

=== Dimorphodon ===
Dimorphodon, a type of pterosaur, appears in Jurassic World, marking its first appearance in the series. In the film, the species launch an attack on tourists after being released from an aviary. Through motion capture, dwarf actor Martin Klebba stood in as a Dimorphodon during a scene in which one of the creatures tries to attack Owen. A full-scale Dimorphodon head was also created. The sound of baby brown pelicans were used as the vocal effects for the Dimorphodon. The animal returns in Jurassic World Dominion with the use of practical effects.

=== Distortus rex ===
Distortus rex is a mutant hybrid of Tyrannosaurus and unknown sauropod. It is the main antagonist of Jurassic World Rebirth. It is a deformed hybrid dinosaur with six limbs with two normal-sized arms, an enlarged forehead similar to a Titanosaurus, and two pillar-shaped gorilla-like arms.

Director Gareth Edwards said its design was inspired by the Xenomorphs in the Alien franchise and the rancors in the Star Wars franchise. With its bulbous head, ILM's visual effects supervisor David Vickery said "It's as if another animal has been wrapped around the T-Rex. Gareth wanted us to feel sorry for it as well as terrified, because its deformities have caused it some pain and there's an encumbrance to it." Edwards was heavily involved in the design of the Distortus rex whose traits include gorilla-like arms and movements at his suggestion.

=== Gallimimus ===
A herd of running Gallimimus is seen in the first film, taking the role of the novel's Hadrosaurus. In the novel, the roar of a T. rex is heard in the background, but the T. rex is not seen. The scene went through several revisions over the course of the film's production. In Crichton's first draft, Grant, Lex, and Tim get caught in a "wall of dinosaurs", including a baby Triceratops, and climb a tree to escape. His revised draft changed this to the characters watching the T. rex attacking a herd of Hadrosaurs from a distance, and the film's second screenwriter, Malia Scotch Marmo, placed them in the middle of the action. David Koepp, the final screenwriter, replaced Hadrosaurus with Gallimimus, on the advice of Tippett.

The Gallimimus was created by ILM entirely through CGI. It was the first dinosaur to be digitized during production. As a result, a test was required to see if digitally animating dinosaurs was even possible. ILM animator Eric Armstrong first built out the skeleton of a single Gallimimus, then animated its run cycle. He then duplicated the skeleton to make a herd. All of the Gallimimus used the same run cycle, which was manually tweaked slightly for each individual dinosaur to make them distinct. The test, which composited the herd of skeletal Gallimimus over a jungle background, was a success, prompting a second test with fully skinned Gallimimus and a T. rex. The overall movement of the herd was planned out using very simplified representations of the dinosaur model, which the animators referred to as "hood ornaments", which were then replaced with full running Gallimimus models.

Unlike most of the dinosaurs in the film, ILM animators created the Gallimimus model by hand rather than scanning one of Winston's maquettes, which made the Gallimimus move more smoothly and be easier to animate. The Gallimimus design was based on ostriches, and the animators also referred to footage of herding gazelles. In the ILM parking lot, animators were filmed running around to provide reference for the dinosaurs' run, with plastic pipes standing in for a fallen tree that the Gallimimus jump over. One of the animators fell while trying to make the jump, and this inspired the incorporation of a Gallimimus also falling. The tree was carefully rigged to get jostled by wires and miniature explosives, so that when the Gallimimus were composited onto the footage, it would appear that they were moving the log. A portion of the scene depicts a Tyrannosaurus killing a Gallimimus, inspired by a scene in the 1969 film The Valley of Gwangi. Horse squeals were used to provide the Gallimimus vocal sounds.

Gallimimus returns in Jurassic World, in which a running herd is depicted during a tour. The scene is a reference to the dinosaur's appearance in the first film, and was created by Image Engine. The company's artists often viewed the species' original appearance for reference. Jeremy Mesana, the animation supervisor for Imagine Engine, said: "We were always going back and staring at that little snippet from the first film. It was always interesting trying to find the feeling of the Gallimimus. Trying to capture the same essence of that original shot was really tricky". By the time Jurassic World was produced, scientists had found that Gallimimus had feathers, although this trait is absent from the film.

=== Giganotosaurus ===
Giganotosaurus is introduced in the 2021 Jurassic World Dominion prologue. It serves as the dinosaur antagonist in the prologue and the film itself. Trevorrow saved the Giganotosaurus for the third Jurassic World film to set up a rivalry between it and the T. rex. In the prologue, a Giganotosaurus kills a T. rex in battle during the Cretaceous, and two cloned versions face off in the subsequent film, set during the present day. In the film's climactic scene, the Giganotosaurus is killed in battle when the T. rex pushes it onto the claws of a Therizinosaurus.

The Giganotosaurus went through many design changes, which included altering the number of spines along its back, as Trevorrow did not want it to resemble a dragon. The dinosaur was originally meant to be a CGI-only animal, until Trevorrow decided to have a practical version created as well, to enhance the actors' performances. Animatronic creator John Nolan said the Giganotosaurus was "probably the biggest challenge" for his team. The dinosaur was expected to take six months to build, but his team only had about three months to finish it, as the COVID-19 pandemic cost them time. An animatronic head and neck – the size of a car – were built by Nolan's team, while ILM depicted the rest of the animal through CGI. Nolan initially used a 3D printer to create a one-tenth scale head, on which the animatronic was based. It was the largest dinosaur head ever created for any of the films. Nolan's team used polystyrene and latex to craft it. The creature was operated on a rig approximately 65 feet (20 m) in length, and it took six hours to relocate the animal from one set to another.

Trevorrow said about the Giganotosaurus, "I wanted something that felt like the Joker. It just wants to watch the world burn". He later clarified the Joker reference, stating that it arose from a conversation with the artist who applied paint to the animatronic. According to Trevorrow, "it's a question of like, 'Well, how do you want this thing to feel?' And then the Joker was my reference. I think [the initial comment] turned into a narrative as if it's like literally the Joker, that was not my intention! Melting face makeup was the note I gave". At Trevorrow's request, battle scars were added to the animal's face, similar to Jack Nicholson's Joker character in the 1989 film Batman. The Joker influence also extended to the dinosaur's lumbering movements.

=== Indominus rex ===
Indominus rex is a fictional theropod dinosaur and the main antagonist in the film Jurassic World. It is a transgenic (or hybrid) dinosaur, made up of DNA from various animals. It was created by the character Dr. Henry Wu, as requested by CEO Simon Masrani, to boost theme park attendance, although it later escapes. In the film, it is stated that the dinosaur's base genome is a T. rex, and that it also has the DNA of Velociraptor, cuttlefish, and tree frog. The film's promotional website states that the creature also has the DNA of theropods Carnotaurus, Giganotosaurus, Majungasaurus, and Rugops. Trevorrow said the mixed DNA allowed the animal to have attributes "that no dinosaur was known to have".

The Indominus is white in color, and can also camouflage itself and adapt to its surroundings, thanks to its cuttlefish DNA. Carnotaurus was previously depicted in Crichton's novel The Lost World with the same ability to camouflage, and the Indominus uses it to evade capture. It can also sense thermal radiation. Other characteristics include its long arms, raptor hand claws, and small thumbs. It is able to walk on two or four legs. ILM's animation supervisor, Glen McIntosh, said: "The goal was to always make sure she felt like a gigantic animal that was a theropod but taking advantage of its extra features". Therizinosaurus inspired the long forelimbs of the Indominus. Horner rejected an early idea that the dinosaur could be depicted as bulletproof, but he otherwise told Trevorrow to add any attributes that he wanted the animal to have. The two began with a list of possible characteristics, then gradually narrowed it down. Trevorrow said: "These kind of things were often decided by the needs of the narrative. If it was going to pick up a guy and bite his head off, it was going to need thumbs". Trevorrow wanted the Indominus to look like it could be an actual dinosaur, while Horner was disappointed that it did not look more extreme, saying he "wanted something that looked really different".

In an earlier draft of the script, the film's dinosaur antagonist was depicted as a real animal, called the malusaurus, despite being a fictional species in reality. Trevorrow chose to rewrite it as a genetically modified hybrid dinosaur named Indominus rex, to maintain consistency with earlier films, which had generally incorporated the latest paleontological discoveries. He said, "I didn't wanna make up a new dinosaur and tell kids it was real". Fans were initially concerned upon learning that the film would feature a hybrid dinosaur, but Trevorrow said the concept was "not tremendously different" from the earlier films, in which the dinosaurs were partially recreated with frog DNA. He described a hybrid as "the next level", and said "we aren't doing anything here that Crichton didn't suggest in his novels". Horner considered the concept of transgenic dinosaurs to be the most realistic aspect of the film, saying it was "more plausible than bringing a dinosaur back from amber". However, a hybridized dinosaur made of various animals' DNA would still be exceedingly difficult to create, due to the complexity of altering the genomes.

Trevorrow said the behavior of the Indominus was partially inspired by the 2013 film Blackfish, saying that the dinosaur "is kind of out killing for sport because it grew up in captivity. It's sort of, like, if the black fish orca got loose and never knew its mother and has been fed from a crane". In the film, it is stated that there were initially two Indominus individuals, and that one cannibalized its sibling. Fifth-scale maquettes of the Indominus rex were created for lighting reference. Motion capture was initially considered for portraying the Indominus, although Trevorrow felt that the method did not work well for the dinosaur. The animal sounds used to create the Indominus roars included those from big pigs, whales, beluga whales, dolphins, a fennec fox, lions, monkeys, and walruses.

The name Indominus rex is derived from the Latin words indomitus meaning "fierce" or "untameable" and rex meaning "king". The creature is sometimes referred to as the I. rex for short, although producer Frank Marshall stated that the film crew abbreviated the name as simply Indominus. Among the public, it was occasionally known during production as Diabolus rex, a name Trevorrow made up to maintain secrecy on the film prior to its release.

In the film, the character Hoskins proposes making miniature versions of the Indominus as military weapons. The Indominus is later defeated in a battle with a T. rex (Rexy), with the aid of a Velociraptor (Blue), and later killed by a Mosasaurus.

In Jurassic World: Fallen Kingdom, DNA is retrieved from a fragment of the Indominus skeleton and is used to create the smaller Indoraptor.

The Indominus also appears in the animated series Jurassic World: Camp Cretaceous, in which it acts as an antagonist in the first season, set before its death in Jurassic World.

=== Indoraptor ===
Indoraptor is a fictional hybrid dinosaur and the secondary antagonist in Jurassic World: Fallen Kingdom. In the film, it is created by Dr. Henry Wu as a weaponized animal, using a bone fragment recovered from the deceased Indominus rex, which included Velociraptor DNA in its makeup. The Indoraptor escapes at Benjamin Lockwood's estate and kills several people, before battling Blue, a Velociraptor. The Indoraptor eventually falls to its death when it is impaled on the horn of a ceratopsian skull, on display in Lockwood's library of dinosaur skeletons. The bone fragment is later destroyed when a T. rex stomps on it. The Indoraptor is the last hybrid dinosaur of the Jurassic World trilogy.

The Indoraptor has long human-like arms, which Spielberg considered to be its scariest trait. It is depicted as a facultative biped with a height of approximately 10 ft (3.0 m) tall while standing on two legs. It is portrayed as 23 feet (7.0 m) long and weighing about 2,200 pounds (1,000 kg). The front teeth and long claws were inspired by Count Orlok in Nosferatu. Bayona chose black for the dinosaur's color to give the appearance of a black shadow, saying "it's very terrifying when you see the Indoraptor in the dark because you can only see the eyes and the teeth". Initially, the film was to feature two Indoraptors, one black and one white. The black Indoraptor would kill the white one, in what Bayona considered similar to Cain and Abel. The white Indoraptor was ultimately removed from the script as the story was considered detailed enough without it.

The Indoraptor was primarily created through CGI, although close-up shots used a practical head, neck, shoulders, foot and arm. Neal Scanlan provided the animatronics. An inflatable Indoraptor stand-in, operated by two puppeteers on set, was used for some scenes, with CGI replacing it later in production. David Vickery, ILM's visual effects supervisor, said that Bayona wanted the Indoraptor to look "malnourished and slightly unhinged". Its vocal sounds were created by combining noises from various types of animal, including chihuahua, pig, cougar, and lion. The sound of dental drills was also used.

Bayona incorporated elements from the 1931 film Frankenstein as he wanted to give the Indoraptor the feel of a "rejected creature". He said: "There's something of that in the way we introduce the character, the Indoraptor, this kind of laboratory in the underground facilities at the end of a long corridor, inside a cell. It has this kind of Gothic element that reminds me a little bit of the world of Frankenstein, this kind of Gothic world. And we have also references of people with mental illness, like this kind of shake you see from time to time. It's kind of like a nervous tic that the Indoraptor has, and it's taken from real references of mentally ill people".

=== Mosasaurus ===
Mosasaurus appears in Jurassic World, as the first aquatic reptile in the films. Earlier drafts for Jurassic Park III and Jurassic Park IV (later Jurassic World) had featured the aquatic reptile Kronosaurus. The Mosasaurus was suggested by Trevorrow, as part of a theme-park feeding show in which guests watch from bleachers as the animal leaps out of a lagoon and catches its prey: a shark hanging above the water. The bleacher seats are then lowered for a view of the mosasaur's aquatic habitat. According to Trevorrow, the theme park expanded its method of DNA extraction beyond mosquitoes, saying, "There's iron in the blood and bones that's preserved the DNA". This allowed for the creature's inclusion "without having to answer the question, 'How the hell does a mosquito bite an underwater reptile?'"

The Mosasaurus was designed to resemble the dinosaurs created by Winston for the earlier films. Trevorrow said: "We made sure to give her a look and a kind of personality in the way we designed her face that recalled Stan Winston's designs for many of the other dinosaurs in this world. She looks like a Jurassic Park dinosaur". Legacy Effects developed the original design and ILM refined it. The animators referenced crocodiles for the creature's swimming pattern.

The Mosasaurus was originally envisioned as a 70-foot (21 m)-long animal, but Spielberg requested that it be enlarged after seeing the initial design. ILM was concerned about making the animal appear too large, but Horner advised the team that an increased length would fit within the realm of possibility, as larger aquatic reptiles were consistently being discovered. The length was increased to nearly 120 feet (37 m). Some criticized the Mosasaurus for appearing to be twice the size of the largest known species. Horner said "the size of this one is a little out of proportion, but we don't know the ultimate size of any extinct animal". The film inaccurately depicts the Mosasaurus with scutes along its back, a trait that was based on outdated depictions of the creature. Its ability to leap is also considered unlikely, as the real animal would have consumed its prey underwater. Audio recordings of a walrus and a beluga whale provided the Mosasaurus roars.

The Mosasaurus returns in Jurassic World: Fallen Kingdom, in the opening and ending sequences. The Mosasaurus is larger in Fallen Kingdom compared to its appearance in the previous film. ILM animation supervisor Glen McIntosh cited this as an example of how "we sometimes have to fudge reality to make something work. From shot to shot, the mosasaurus often changed size slightly to make best use of each frame composition". Although Mosasaurus was thought to have had a forked tongue, McIntosh said the fictional animal was given a regular tongue to make it "more believable to most filmgoers", saying that "we'd played with its scale so much that we felt giving it a forked tongue would be too much".

For Jurassic World and its sequel, ILM referenced footage of breaching whales, which helped the team determine how to create realistic shots where the Mosasaurus leaps from the water. The Mosasaurus makes a brief return in the short film Battle at Big Rock, and in Jurassic World Dominion, where she is shown sinking a fishing boat. This scene consists entirely of footage from the television program Deadliest Catch, after COVID-19 lockdowns forced alterations to the film's production. The show's 16 seasons were evaluated for ideal shots that could be used in Dominion, with the Mosasaurus added in through CGI. A Mosasaurus also appears in Jurassic World Rebirth with an updated design. It was responsible for stranding the characters on the island and showed to have some kind of symbiotic relationship with a pack of Spinosaurus.

=== Mutadon ===
Mutadon is a fictional mutant hybrid dinosaur, with several individuals appearing in Jurassic World Rebirth. A carnivorous flying dinosaur with wings, the Mutadons are a combination of Velociraptor and a pterosaur. This concept was conceived by the film's writer, David Koepp, following an encounter that he had with a bat during repair work at his house.

The Mutadons went through many design changes, some of which depicted the animal with multiple heads and varying limb configurations, as ILM sought a balance between science fiction and believability. Carlos Ciudad, a visual effects producer on the film, said: "Mixing a raptor and a pterosaur presented a tricky design challenge. Although it's portrayed as a failed experiment within the story, the creature still needed to feel grounded and realistic on screen." The final design was selected around the end of 2024, after nine months.

=== Pachycephalosaurus ===
Pachycephalosaurus appears in The Lost World and its film adaptation. For the film, it was created as a 5-foot (1.5 m) dinosaur measuring eight feet long, though the real animal was 16 feet (4.9 m) long. Three versions of the Pachycephalosaurus were created for filming: a full hydraulic puppet, a head, and a head-butter. The latter was built to withstand high impact for a scene in which the dinosaur head-butts one of the hunter vehicles using its domed skull. The puppet version was one of the most complex created for the film, and was used for a scene in which the dinosaur is captured. The legs were controlled through pneumatics. Among the public, Pachycephalosaurus is the best-known member of the Pachycephalosauria clade, in part because of its appearance in The Lost World: Jurassic Park.

In Jurassic World, a Pachycephalosaurus briefly appears on a surveillance screen in the park's control room.

=== Pteranodon ===
Pteranodon, a pterosaur, makes a brief appearance at the end of The Lost World: Jurassic Park. Earlier drafts of the script had featured Pteranodon in a larger role, and Spielberg insisted to Jurassic Park III director Joe Johnston that he include the creature in the third film.

Pteranodon is prominently featured in Jurassic Park III, although it is a fictionalization of the actual animal, and it has a different appearance to those seen in The Lost World: Jurassic Park. In the third film, a group of Pteranodons are kept in an aviary on Isla Sorna. The idea of a pterosaur aviary had originated in Crichton's original Jurassic Park novel. An earlier draft of Jurassic Park III had included a storyline about Pteranodons escaping to the Costa Rican mainland and killing people. The finished film ends with escaped Pteranodons flying away from Isla Sorna, as Johnston wanted an ending shot of "these creatures being beautiful and elegant". He denied, then later suggested, that the fleeing Pteranodons would be included in the plot for a fourth film. Promotional material for the Jurassic World films later explained that the escaped Pteranodons were killed off-screen after reaching Canada.

The Pteranodons in Jurassic Park III were created through a combination of animatronics and puppetry. Winston's team created a Pteranodon model with a wingspan of 40 feet (12 m), although the creatures are predominantly featured in the film through CGI. To create the flight movements, ILM animators studied footage of flying bats and birds, and also consulted a Pteranodon expert. Winston's team also designed and created five rod puppets to depict baby Pteranodons in a nest, with puppeteers working underneath the nest to control them.

Another variation of Pteranodon is featured in Jurassic World, which also depicts them living in an aviary. They are later inadvertently freed by the Indominus rex and wreak havoc on the park's tourists. For Jurassic World, the Pteranodon vocal effects were created using audio recordings of a mother osprey, defending her chicks against another individual.

Escaped Pteranodons make an appearance in a post-credits scene for Jurassic World: Fallen Kingdom, set at the Paris Las Vegas resort, where they land atop its Eiffel Tower replica. A Pteranodon makes a brief appearance in the short film Battle at Big Rock, and several individuals appear in the Jurassic World Dominion prologue, as well as the main film. A tiny Pteranodon was seen caged at a fishing village in Jurassic World Rebirth.

The films depict Pteranodon with the ability to pick up humans using its feet, although the actual animal would not have been able to do this.

=== Pyroraptor ===
Pyroraptor appears in Jurassic World Dominion, becoming one of the first fully feathered dinosaurs in the film series. For reference, designer John Nolan created an animatronic model representing the head and neck, covered in real, red-colored feathers. Various research and efforts were dedicated to properly simulating feather movements. This included the use of wind machines, foam latex, and silicone. The animal is depicted swimming underwater at one point, and research went into various feathers to determine which looked best in such a scenario. The feathers were dyed and hand woven onto a net which wrapped over the head, making the feathers move and react with the animatronic.

In another scene, the Pyroraptor jumps out of the water with its feathers soaked, presenting a challenge for CGI artists. According to David Vickery, ILM's visual effects supervisor, feather and water effects are very difficult to achieve digitally, and the two together presented "a perfect storm of technological complexity". To resolve this, ILM used the 3D software Houdini to adequately depict the feathers. Trevorrow considered Pyroraptor the most difficult dinosaur to create, due to the amount of work that went into its feathers.

=== Quetzalcoatlus ===
The pterosaur Quetzalcoatlus makes appearances in Jurassic World Dominion, including a sequence in which a group attack a cargo plane. Despite its light bodyweight, Quetzalcoatlus is depicted with the exaggerated ability to tear the plane apart. Trevorrow was inspired to include such a scene after viewing footage of a sparrowhawk attacking a model airplane in flight. A particular shot in the film shows one of the animal's claws crashing into the plane's windshield. This was achieved through a special-effects rig and cantilever, releasing the claws and slamming them into the windshield. The animal's CGI model proved to be a challenge, due to skin and muscle simulations in the wings, as well as the presence of fur along its back.

Quetzalcoatlus returns in Jurassic World Rebirth, with a modified head design, as a limited fossil record of the animal's skull allowed for artistic license.

=== Spinosaurus ===
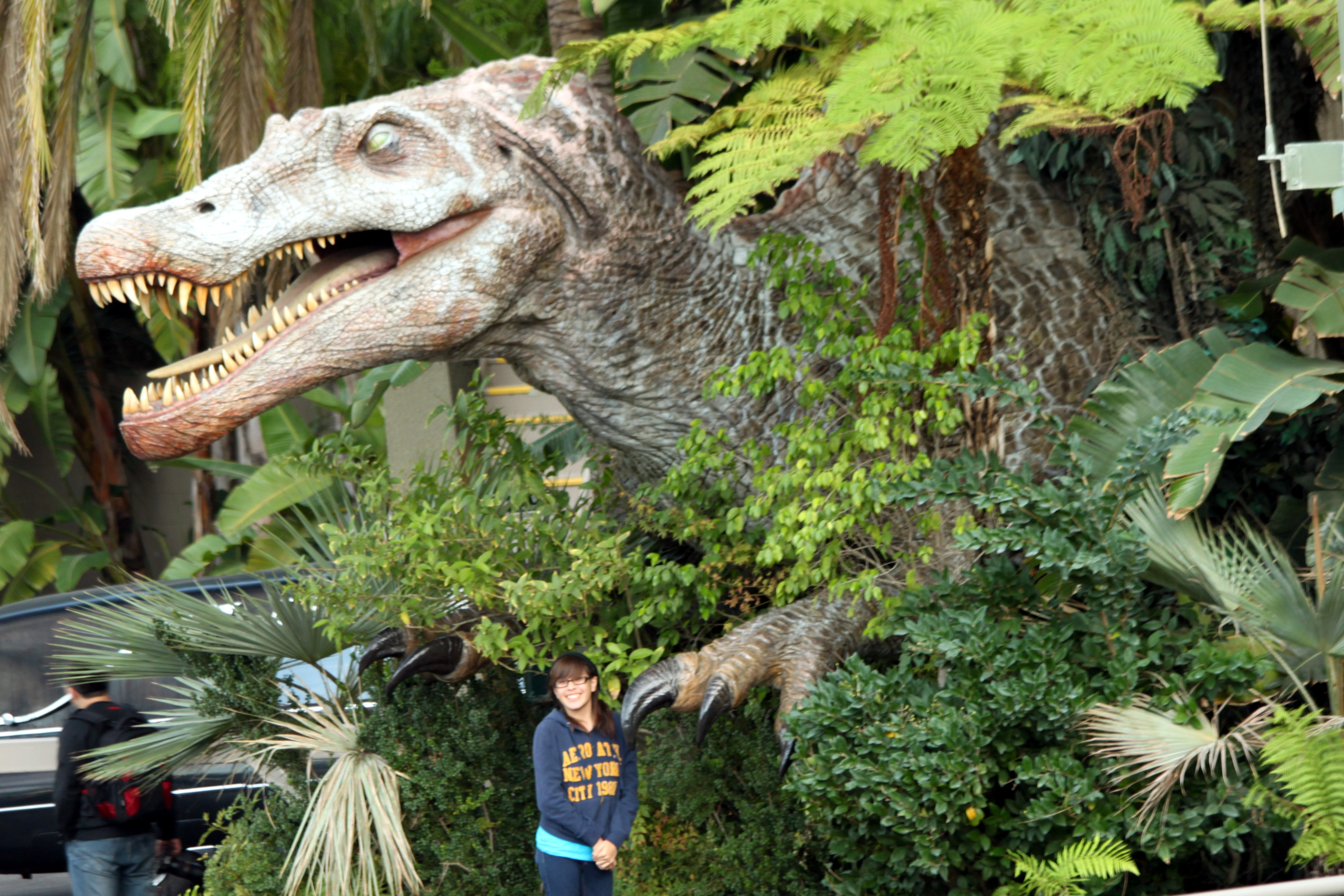
Statue of the Spinosaurus from Jurassic Park III on display at Universal Studios Hollywood.

Spinosaurus is introduced in Jurassic Park III and appears throughout the film, which popularized the animal. After the previous films, the filmmakers wanted to replace the T. rex with a new dinosaur antagonist. Baryonyx was originally considered, before Horner convinced the filmmakers to go with his favorite carnivorous dinosaur: Spinosaurus, an animal larger than the T. rex. Spinosaurus had a distinctive sail on its back; director Joe Johnston said: "A lot of dinosaurs have a very similar silhouette to the T-Rex... and we wanted the audience to instantly recognize this as something else".

Winston's team created the Spinosaurus over a 10-month period, beginning with a 1/16 maquette. This was followed by a 1/5 scale version with more detail, and eventually the full-scale version. The Spinosaurus animatronic was built from the knees up, while full body shots were created through CGI. The animatronic measured 44 feet long, weighed 13 tons, and was faster and more powerful than the 9-ton T. rex. Winston and his team had to remove a wall to get the Spinosaurus animatronic out of his studio. It was then transported by flatbed truck to the Universal Studios Lot, where a sound stage had to be designed specifically to accommodate the large dinosaur. The Spinosaurus was placed on a track that allowed the creature to be moved backward and forward for filming. Four Winston technicians were required to fully operate the animatronic. It had 1,000 horsepower, compared to the T. rex which operated at 300 horsepower. Johnston said: "It's like the difference between a family station wagon and a Ferrari". For a scene in which the Spinosaurus stomps on a crashed airplane, Winston's team created a full-scale Spinosaurus leg prop, controlled by puppeteers. The leg, suspended in the air by two poles, was slammed down into a plane fuselage prop for a series of shots.

The film's Spinosaurus was based on limited records suggesting what the actual animal had looked like. One scene depicts the Spinosaurus swimming, an ability that the real animal was believed to have possessed at the time. Later research proved this theory, suggesting that the animal was primarily an aquatic dinosaur, whereas the film version was depicted largely as a land animal. The roars of the Spinosaurus were created by mixing the low guttural sounds of a lion and an alligator, a bear cub crying, and a lengthened cry of a large bird that gave the roars a raspy quality.

In Jurassic Park III, the Spinosaurus kills a T. rex during battle. Some fans of the series were upset with the decision to kill and replace the T. rex. Horner later said that the Spinosaurus would not have won such a fight, saying it had inferior bite force and likely ate only fish. An early script featured a death sequence for the Spinosaurus near the end of the film, as the character Alan Grant would use a Velociraptor resonating chamber to call a pack of raptors which would attack and kill it.

A skeleton of Spinosaurus is featured in Jurassic World, on display in the theme park. The skeleton is later destroyed when a T. rex is set free and smashes through it, meant as revenge for the earlier scene in Jurassic Park III.

A Spinosaurus appears in the fourth and fifth seasons of the animated television series Jurassic World Camp Cretaceous, premiered in 2021 and 2022. The dinosaur serves as one of several threats to the main characters. Executive producer Scott Kreamer suggested it is the same Spinosaurus featured in Jurassic Park III. Fellow executive producer Colin Trevorrow, when asked if it is the same one, responded "My instinct is actually, no, because it sounds different, but I'm a nerd. So what I don't want to do is mess it up for everyone making Camp Cretaceous. I'm going to screw this up for them. I found it to be a slightly different animal, like on sight and on sound". The show's Spinosaurus design is based on the original ILM files created for Jurassic Park III. In the fifth season, the Spinosaurus engages in battles with a T. rex, providing fans a long-awaited rematch between the two dinosaurs. In the final battle, the Spinosaurus retreats when a second T. rex joins in.

Several sea-dwelling spinosaurs appear in Jurassic World Rebirth, with a redesign to reflect newer research. According to ILM's visual effects supervisor David Vickery, "We've given it more powerful hind limbs, a much bigger, broader tail, webbing in between its feet, and the appearance of a shorter more powerful neck by adding fatty deposits and extra skin folds." ILM studied crocodiles and grizzly bears to determine the animal's design and behavior.

=== Stegoceratops ===
Stegoceratops is a hybrid dinosaur made from the DNA of a Stegosaurus and a Triceratops. It makes only a brief appearance near the end of Jurassic World, when an image of the dinosaur is visible on a computer screen in Dr. Henry Wu's laboratory. An early draft of the film had a scene where Owen and Claire came across the Stegoceratops in the jungle on Isla Nublar. The Stegoceratops would have joined the Indominus rex as a second hybrid dinosaur. However, Trevorrow decided to remove the animal from the final script after his son made him realize that having multiple hybrids would make the Indominus less unique.

Although the dinosaur is largely removed from the film, a toy version was still released by Hasbro, which produced a toyline based on Jurassic World. Discussing the Indominus and his decision to remove the Stegoceratops, Trevorrow said: "The idea that there was more than one made it feel less like the one synthetic among all the other organics, and suddenly it seemed entirely wrong to have it in the movie. I suddenly hated the idea but the toy still exists as a kind of remnant because Hasbro toys are locked a year out". The dinosaur also appears in the video games Jurassic World: The Game (2015), Jurassic World Alive (2018) and Jurassic World Evolution (2018).

=== Stegosaurus ===
Stegosaurus appears in the Jurassic Park novel but was replaced by Triceratops for the film adaptation. The dinosaur's name (misspelled as "Stegasaurus") is seen on an embryo cooler label in the film, but the dinosaur is otherwise absent. Stegosaurus instead made its film debut in The Lost World: Jurassic Park, after writer David Koepp took a suggestion from a child's letter to include the dinosaur. According to Spielberg, Stegosaurus was included due to "popular demand". In the film, a group of adult Stegosaurus attack Dr. Sarah Harding when they spot her taking pictures of their baby, believing that she is trying to harm it. Stegosaurus is among other dinosaurs that are captured later in the film.

Full-sized versions of an adult and infant Stegosaurus were built by Winston's team, although Spielberg later opted for a digital version of the adults, so they could be more mobile. Winston's adult Stegosaurus was 26 feet (7.9 m) long and 16 feet (4.9 m) tall, and is only shown in a brief shot, in which the animal is caged. The baby Stegosaurus was 8 feet (2.4 m) long and weighed 400 pounds (180 kg).

Stegosaurus has appeared briefly in each film since then. For Jurassic World, ILM studied the movements of rhinos and elephants, and copied their movements when animating the Stegosaurus. The film inaccurately depicts the dinosaur with its tail held down while it would have been held more horizontally.

Stegosaurus makes a brief return in the short film Battle at Big Rock.

=== Stygimoloch ===
Stygimoloch is introduced in Jurassic World: Fallen Kingdom, and was included for comic relief. Its vocal sounds were a combination of dachshund, camel, and pig noises. Sound designer Al Nelson said: "It created this sweet, gurgling kind of thing that fits perfectly with this funny little creature". Horner was surprised by the inclusion of Stygimoloch, whose existence was considered doubtful by him and other paleontologists; they believed the animal to actually be a juvenile form of Pachycephalosaurus rather than a separate dinosaur. Like Pachycephalosaurus, the Stygimoloch had a domed skull, which it uses in the film to smash through a brick wall.

For its return in Dominion, animatronic designer John Nolan studied modern animals which also headbutt. This inspired a scene in which the Stygimoloch is captive in an anti-ramming cage; the animal's front half was constructed and visible, while a puppeteer performed its thrashing movements from behind.

=== Therizinosaurus ===
Therizinosaurus is introduced in Jurassic World Dominion, becoming one of the first fully feathered dinosaurs to appear in the film series. The Therizinosaurus is partially blind due to cataracts and uses echolocation to get around, producing a series of clicking noises that reverberate in its environment. The animal's appearances include a sequence in which it stalks Claire in a forest.

Trevorrow was initially excited to include the animal, but had second thoughts upon learning that it was an herbivore. Co-writer Emily Carmichael said that "the rest of us were like, 'It might still have its territory threatened. It might still be formidable and dangerous. Just because it's vegetarian doesn't mean it's a pushover!'" Being an herbivore, Trevorrow considered it challenging to present the Therizinosaurus as a scary animal. The filmmakers relied on paleontological discoveries for the dinosaur's design, but also sought to have it resemble Winston's animatronics. The feathers, movements, and stalking behavior were based on research into various birds, including ostriches, emus, and cassowaries. Nolan created an animatronic head for the Therizinosaurus, while the rest was portrayed through CGI.

=== Triceratops ===
Triceratops makes an appearance in the first film as a sick dinosaur, taking the place of the novel's Stegosaurus. The decision to make the switch was by Scotch Marmo, who felt that Triceratops was adorable, like a cross between a cow and a rhinoceros. Triceratops was a childhood favorite of Spielberg's. It was portrayed through an animatronic, created by Winston's team, that required eight puppeteers to operate. It was sculpted by Joey Orosco, with a hydraulically operated jaw, tongue, and eye. Winston was caught off-guard when Spielberg decided to shoot the Triceratops scene sooner than expected, making it the first dinosaur to be filmed during production. The idea of Grant lying on the belly of the Triceratops as it breathed was improvised by Spielberg, who was overcome by the realism of the animatronic. The design of the Triceratops was inspired by elephants and white rhinoceroses. The animatronic's initial paint job was too pristine, and Winston sprayed it with a hose and caked it in mud to make it look lived-in. The texture for the animatronic's back was patterned after real archeological findings of Triceratops skin imprints. The size of the animatronic made using standard silicone molds unfeasible, so instead aerospace molding compounds were used. The Triceratops required relatively little articulation, with only eye and leg movement and simulated breathing required. The Triceratops feces was made of clay, mud, and straw, then covered in honey and papaya to attract flies. To create the Triceratops vocals, sound designer Gary Rydstrom breathed into a cardboard tube and combined the sound with that of cows near his workplace at Skywalker Ranch.

Aside from the adult Triceratops, a baby had also been created for the character of Lex to ride around on, but this was cut to improve the film's tone and pacing. The construction of the baby Triceratops was overseen by Shannon Shea, and due to the complexity of the scene, it was decided that three animatronics would have to be made; one that could stand and had facial detail, one that could run, and one that could roll around. Further into production, it was decided that the running and rolling actions would be computer generated, so only the standing animatronic was made. Shea made a test maquette, but Spielberg deemed it too cartoony, so Shea built the final puppet to be more realistic. The baby Triceratops animatronic was about two weeks from completion when Spielberg cut the scene. The scene was cut because Spielberg deemed it "too Disney-like, too cute", and it didn't fit the tone of the film. Removing the scene allowed about $500,000 to be removed from the budget.

Triceratops makes brief appearances in each of the subsequent films. In The Lost World: Jurassic Park, a baby Triceratops was created by Winston's team for a shot depicting the animal in a cage. For its appearance in Jurassic World, the ILM animators studied rhinos and elephants, as they did with the Stegosaurus. In the film, Triceratops is depicted galloping, although the real animal was sluggish and would not have been able to do so.

An adult and baby Triceratops appear in Jurassic World: Fallen Kingdom. Triceratops returns in Jurassic World: Dominion.

=== Tyrannosaurus ===
Tyrannosaurus is the primary dinosaur featured in the novels and throughout the film series. The roars of the T. rex were created by mixing the recorded vocals of a baby elephant, a tiger, and an alligator.

==== Rexy ====
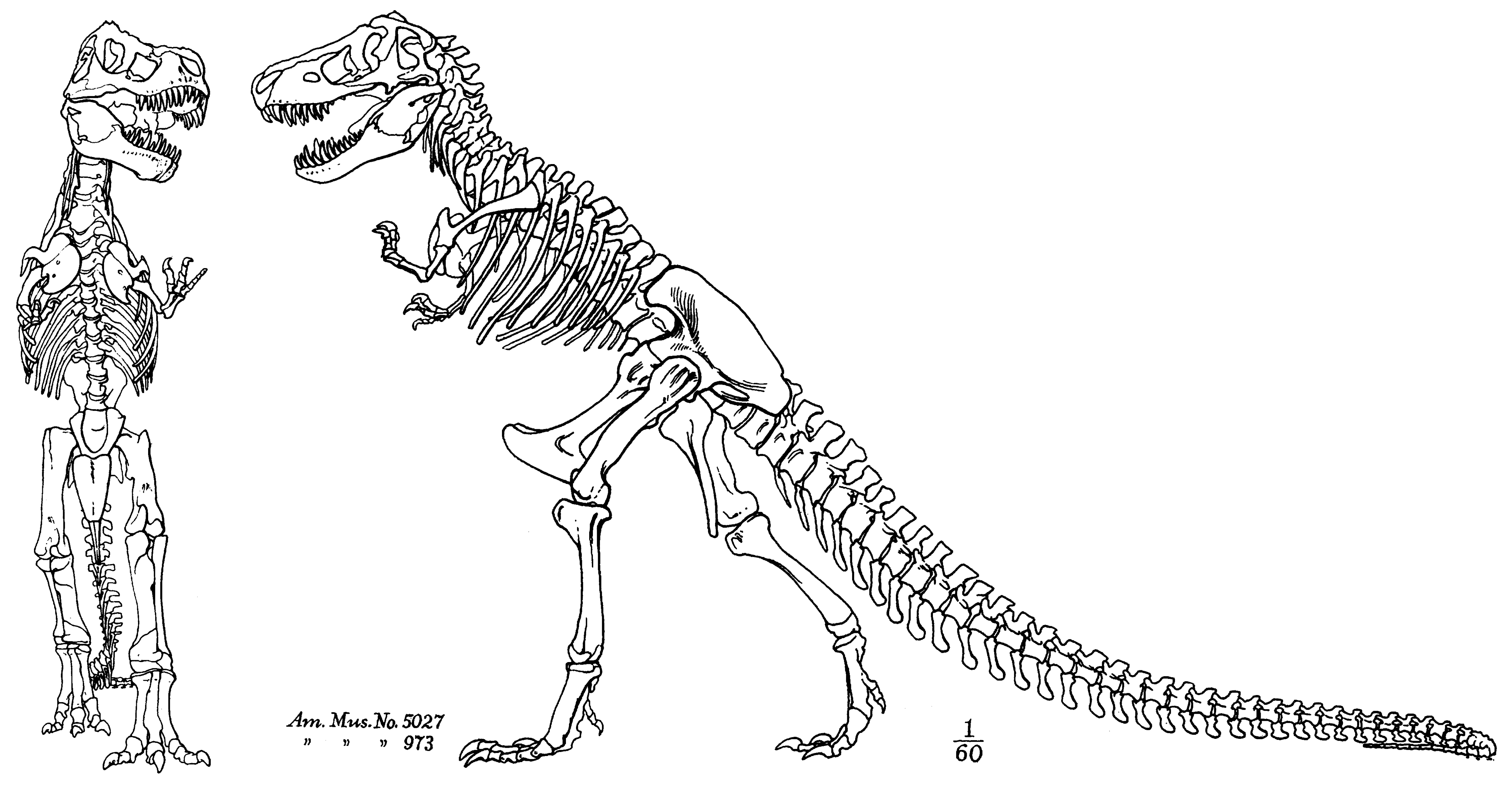
A 1917 Tyrannosaurus skeletal diagram, which was the basis for the cover of the novel and subsequently the logo of the films

For the first film, Winston's team created an animatronic T. rex that stood 20 feet (6.1 m), weighed 9,000 pounds (4,100 kg), and was 40 feet (12 m) long. The same T. rex individual appears throughout the Jurassic World trilogy, and has since become commonly known as "Rexy" among fans.

==== The Lost World ====
A Tyrannosaurus family is featured in The Lost World: Jurassic Park. The original T. rex animatronic from the first film was reused for the sequel, and Winston's team also built a second adult. The animatronics were built from head to mid-body, while full body shots were created through CGI. The animatronics weighed nine tons each and cost $1 million apiece.

Michael Lantieri, the film's special effects supervisor, said, "The big T. rex robot can pull two Gs of force when it's moving from right to left. If you hit someone with that, you'd kill them. So, in a sense, we did treat the dinosaurs as living, dangerous creatures". The animatronics were used for a scene in which the dinosaurs smash their heads against a trailer, causing authentic damage to the vehicle rather than using computer effects. As part of this sequence, an 80-foot track was built into the sound stage floor, allowing the T. rexes to be moved backward and forward.

The T. rexes could not be moved from their location on the sound stage, so new sets had to be built around the animatronics as filming progressed. Animatronics were primarily used for a scene in which the T. rexes kill the character Eddie, with the exception of two CGI shots: when the animals emerge from the forest and when they tear Eddie's body in half. One scene with the animatronics involved the dinosaurs tearing a vehicle apart to get to Eddie; this required close collaboration with a stunt coordinator. An animatronic T. rex was also used in scenes depicting the deaths of Dr. Robert Burke and Peter Ludlow.

As in the novel The Lost World, a baby T. rex is also depicted in the film adaptation, through two different practical models, including a remote-controlled version for the actors to carry. A second, hybrid version was operated by hydraulics and cables; this one was used during a scene in which the dinosaur lies on an operating table while a cast is set on its broken leg. Weeks before filming began, Spielberg decided to change the ending to have an adult T. rex rampage through San Diego looking for its baby, saying, "We've gotta do it. It's too fun not to".

==== Others ====
A T. rex appears only briefly in Jurassic Park III, which instead uses a Spinosaurus as the main antagonist. In the film, a T. rex is killed in a battle against a Spinosaurus.

Two T.rex appears in the fourth and fifth season of the series Jurassic World: Camp Cretaceous explicitly named "Big Eatie" and "Little Eatie". Both dinosaurs are grey with a tan underside, and used on the Mantah Corp island for experimental fighting.

A T. rex also appears in Jurassic World Rebirth, featuring an updated design. Director Gareth Edwards described it as "a healthier, heavier, more muscular, more bull-like" animal, while retaining the typical look of a Jurassic Park T. rex. This dinosaur is built more accurately with its forelimbs being directed one to another without pronation.

=== Velociraptor ===
Blue in Jurassic World: Fallen Kingdom

Velociraptor has major roles in the novels and the films, both of which depict it as an intelligent pack hunter that is bigger than its real-life counterpart. The franchise's Velociraptors are actually based on the larger Deinonychus despite being even larger than the real life ones, although Crichton used the name Velociraptor because he thought it sounded more dramatic.

For their on-screen appearances, the raptors were created using a variety of production methods, including animatronics, CGI, and men in suits. Since the first film's release, it has been discovered that Velociraptors had feathers, although later films such as Jurassic World have ignored this, maintaining consistency with the designs used in earlier films. At Spielberg's suggestion, Jurassic World introduced the concept of a dinosaur researcher, Owen Grady, who has a close relationship with velociraptors. One such individual, named Blue, returns in the next two Jurassic World films and has become a fan favorite. Other Raptors raised by Owen Grady are commonly known as Charlie, Echo and Delta. Raptors also appear in Jurassic World Rebirth.

=== Other creatures ===
In the first film, a replica skeleton of Alamosaurus is present in the Jurassic Park visitor center. Parasaurolophus made a brief debut in the first film and has appeared in each one since then, including the short film Battle at Big Rock and the animated series Jurassic World: Camp Cretaceous, which introduced a bioluminescent variant.

Mamenchisaurus appears briefly in The Lost World: Jurassic Park as one of the dinosaurs chased by Peter Ludlow's group. The design was based on a maquette created by Winston's team. ILM then took the Brachiosaurus model from the first film and altered it to portray the Mamenchisaurus, which was fully computer-generated.

Ceratosaurus and Corythosaurus are introduced in Jurassic Park III, through brief appearances.

Allosaurus, Baryonyx, Carnotaurus, and Sinoceratops are introduced in Jurassic World: Fallen Kingdom. Baryonyx and Carnotaurus were among dinosaurs created through CGI. The Carnotaurus vocal sounds were made from orangutan noises, as well as Styrofoam, which was scraped with a double-bass bow. Sinoceratops makes several appearances in the film, including a scene in which the dinosaur is shown licking Owen after he has been sedated. Animator Jance Rubinchik described this as the dinosaur's motherly instinct to save Owen. The scene was shot using a prop tongue. The film depicts Sinoceratops as having holes in its frill, although in reality the frill would have been covered in skin.

In Fallen Kingdom, the skull of an Agujaceratops is kept on display in Benjamin Lockwood's estate. Production designer Andy Nicholson said "we were quite conscious that it couldn't be a Triceratops because it wouldn't have been big enough to kill the Indoraptor. With that in mind, we created a new genus which was an amalgamation of two different ceratopsians". Several creatures appear in the film as dioramas, on display in Lockwood's estate. These include Concavenator, Mononykus, Dracorex, and Diplodocus.

Allosaurus returns in Battle at Big Rock, which also introduces Nasutoceratops.

Jurassic World Dominion introduces several creatures, including Atrociraptor, which Trevorrow described as more vicious than the Velociraptors. Another new creature is Lystrosaurus, a therapsid rather than a dinosaur, which is portrayed with the use of an animatronic handled by five puppeteers. Microceratus, a favorite dinosaur of Trevorrow's, also makes its series debut in Dominion. Returning dinosaurs include Allosaurus, Baryonyx, Carnotaurus, and Nasutoceratops.

The prologue for Dominion introduces several other creatures, including Dreadnoughtus, Iguanodon, and Oviraptor. It also features Moros, a small, feathered member of the tyrannosaur family that was described in 2019. The Moros depicted appears to be juvenile. However, in the Jurassic World Evolution games, the tiny specimen is the adult variation. Moros also appears in the film itself, in addition to Iguanodon. Dreadnoughtus appears several times as well, through CGI. An Oviraptor appears in a deleted scene, in which it is forced to fight a Lystrosaurus which bites its head off.

Titanosaurus is introduced in Jurassic World Rebirth and is the largest dinosaur in the film. Rebirth also introduces the pterosaur Anurognathus.

== See also ==
- List of films featuring dinosaurs
