= Velociraptors in Jurassic Park =

Velociraptor
- Jurassic Park race
- Two Velociraptors in a publicity still for Jurassic Park (1993)
- First appearance: Jurassic Park; 1990
- Last appearance: Jurassic World Rebirth; 2025
- Created by: Michael Crichton
- Based on: Deinonychus

In-universe information
- Created by: InGen
- Type: Dinosaur
- Notable members: Blue

The dromaeosaurid genus, Velociraptor, was popularized by its appearance in the Jurassic Park franchise, which features numerous individuals of the genus. They first appear in Michael Crichton's 1990 novel Jurassic Park, followed by a 1993 film adaptation from director Steven Spielberg, which spawned a series of films. Despite their name, Crichton heavily based the Velociraptors on the larger Deinonychus, and this was carried over into the films. The on-screen raptors were created using several production methods, including animatronics by Stan Winston and CGI by Industrial Light & Magic (ILM).

The 2015 film Jurassic World introduces a group of named raptors who were being trained in a research program. Among these is an individual named Blue, who returns in the sequels Jurassic World: Fallen Kingdom (2018) and Jurassic World Dominion (2022). The concept of trained raptors was conceived by Spielberg, who served as executive producer on the Jurassic World films. Blue is among the most popular Jurassic Park/World dinosaurs and, alongside Rexy the Tyrannosaurus, has become a fan favorite in the franchise.

== Appearances ==
=== Novels and films ===
In Crichton's original novel and the film adaptation, dinosaurs have been genetically engineered by InGen for a theme park on the fictional Isla Nublar. The Velociraptors are portrayed as highly intelligent, problem-solving pack hunters, able to run at speeds reaching 60 miles per hour. They terrorize the main characters and are responsible for several deaths, including that of Ray Arnold. They also stalk Lex and Tim Murphy in a restaurant kitchen at the park's visitor center. The raptors are overseen by park warden Robert Muldoon, who is killed by them as well in the film.

In the novel, eight raptors were bred by the park, although more are discovered to have been breeding elsewhere on the island. Eight were also bred in the film, although a large female raptor killed five others and became pack leader for the two remaining individuals. One of these raptors gets trapped in the restaurant freezer while the other two are killed by a Tyrannosaurus (known off-screen as Rexy).

Raptors are also featured in Crichton's sequel novel The Lost World and its film adaptation The Lost World: Jurassic Park, both taking place at InGen's abandoned site on Isla Sorna. The raptors again terrorize and kill several characters.

A different group of raptors are featured in the film Jurassic Park III, also set on Isla Sorna. In the film, paleontologist Dr. Alan Grant states that raptor intelligence was superior to that of cetaceans and primates. In Jurassic Park III, the velociraptors are more intelligent than they were in any other Jurassic movies. If not for the extinction of dinosaurs, Grant believes that raptors may have risen to become the dominant species on Earth. He theorizes that their intelligence came from an ability to communicate with each other, using their resonating chambers, a theory that is later proven when he encounters InGen's raptors on the island.

In Jurassic World, Blue is the oldest of the four Velociraptors trained by Owen Grady for a research program on Isla Nublar, the site of a new theme park. She and her three younger sisters, Delta, Echo, and Charlie, are later used to hunt down the escaped hybrid dinosaur Indominus rex, only to turn against their trainer when accepting the Indominus as their new alpha. Later, Blue is the first to change her loyalty back to Owen and fight against the Indominus. After the rest of her pack is killed by the hybrid, Blue joins a battle alongside the Tyrannosaurus (Rexy) against the Indominus, who is then killed by a Mosasaurus. Blue is free to roam the island after staff and visitors evacuate.

Three years later, in Jurassic World: Fallen Kingdom, the dinosaurs on Isla Nublar face extinction from an impending volcanic eruption. Owen helps rescue Blue from the island, although both are shot and nearly killed in the process (Blue shot by a pistol while attacking a mercenary, Owen shot with a tranquilizer by Ken Wheatley). After an operation to save her life, Blue is transported to Lockwood Estate in northern California to provide a blood transfusion to the Indoraptor. However, the latter escapes and goes on a rampage. Blue kills the Indoraptor in battle, saving Owen, Claire Dearing, and Maisie Lockwood. Free once again, Blue shares a moment with Owen before retreating into the wilderness.

Blue returns in Jurassic World Dominion, taking place four years after Fallen Kingdom. She has lived in the Sierra Nevada mountains near Owen's family and now has an asexually reproduced hatchling, who Maisie names Beta. Maisie and Beta are taken by Biosyn mercenaries for research. Owen promises Blue that he will bring both of them back, eventually following through. After being reunited, Blue and Beta return to the wilderness.

Two raptors appear briefly in Jurassic World Rebirth, with one killed by a Mutadon.

=== Other media and attractions ===
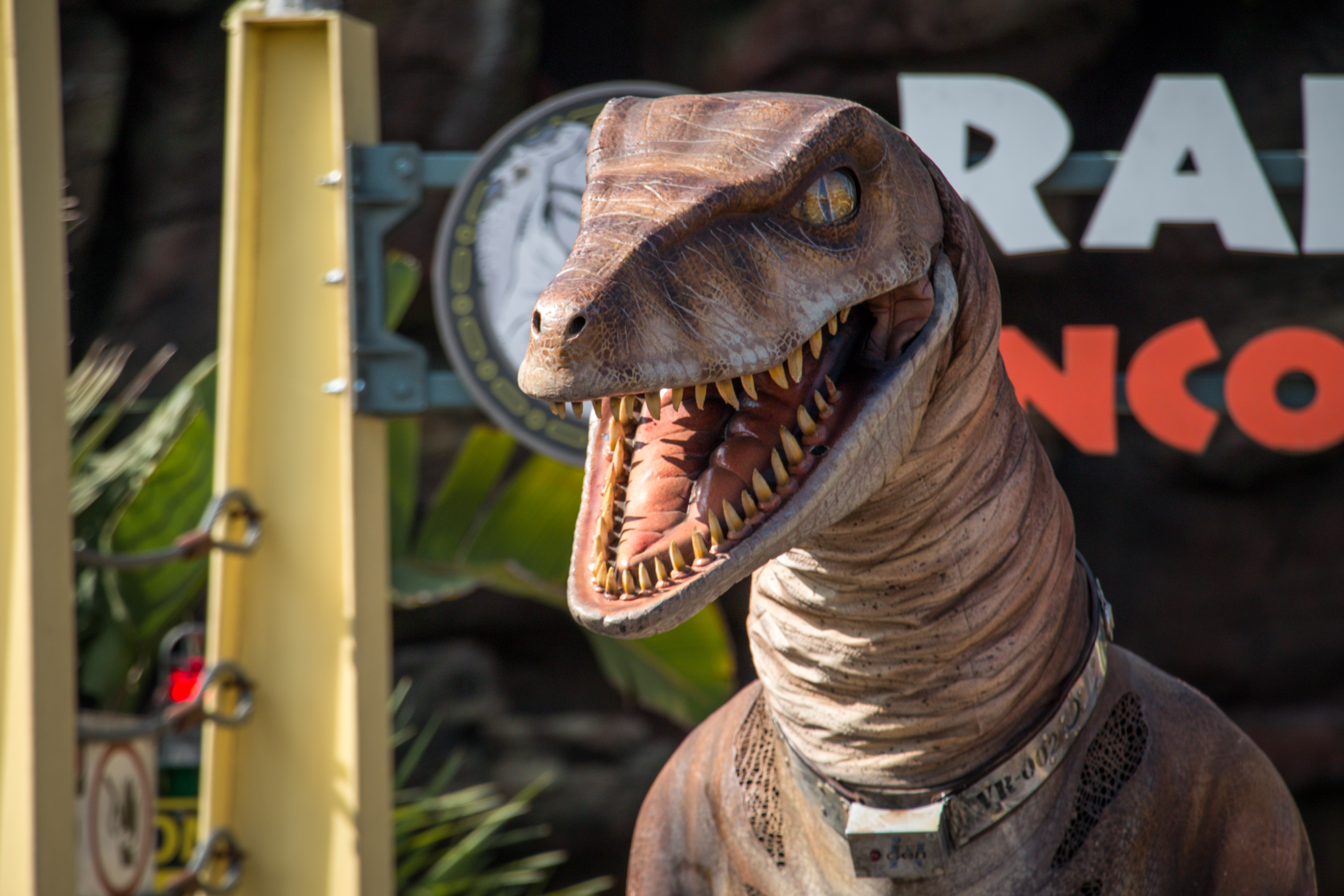
A performer in a Velociraptor costume at Universal Studios Hollywood, 2016.

Aside from her appearance in the Jurassic World films, Blue also appears as a major character in the animated show Jurassic World Camp Cretaceous, and makes appearances in video games such as Jurassic World: The Game and Jurassic World Alive, and has a model in Jurassic World Evolution. She is also the focus of a two-part virtual reality miniseries, titled Jurassic World: Blue. It was released for Oculus VR headsets as a Fallen Kingdom tie-in, and depicts Blue on Isla Nublar at the time of the volcanic eruption.

Jurassic World: The Ride, opened at Universal Studios Hollywood in 2019, features Blue. VelociCoaster, an attraction opened at Universal Studios Orlando in 2021, has animatronics of Blue and her sisters, who feature prominently throughout the ride. Both Universal parks also include Raptor Encounter, introduced in 2015. The attraction features a raptor, played by a performer in a creature suit, interacting with park visitors. Blue became part of the attraction in 2018.

== Scientific accuracy ==
=== Size ===
A size comparison diagram between a real-life Velociraptor (green) and a Velociraptor from Jurassic Park (orange) alongside a human (blue)

Real Velociraptors measured approximately 2 feet (0.61 m) in height and 6 feet (1.8 m) in length. The franchise, however, depicts the animal as being larger than its real-life counterpart. The raptors' fictitious design is actually based on the larger Deinonychus. In writing Jurassic Park, Crichton was partly inspired by Gregory S. Paul's 1988 book Predatory Dinosaurs of the World, which labeled Deinonychus as a Velociraptor species due to Paul's belief that many dinosaur genera should be combined.

John Ostrom, who discovered Deinonychus, was also consulted by Crichton for the novel, and later by director Steven Spielberg for the film adaptation. Ostrom said that Crichton based the novel's Velociraptors on Deinonychus in "almost every detail", but ultimately chose the name Velociraptor because he thought it sounded more dramatic. Crichton's version of Velociraptor, depicted at 6 feet (1.8 m) tall, was carried over into the film adaptation, the latter also stating the animal's length to be around 9 feet (2.7 m). The Utahraptor, however, was a more accurate dinosaur in size comparison to the franchise's Velociraptors; it was discovered shortly before the 1993 release of Jurassic Park's film adaptation. Special-effects artist Stan Winston, who worked on the raptors, joked: "After we created it, they discovered it".

John Hankla, an advisor for Fallen Kingdom, provided an accurately sized Velociraptor skeleton that appears in the background at Lockwood Estate's library of dinosaur skeletons. It is the first accurately sized Velociraptor to appear in the franchise.

=== Other traits ===
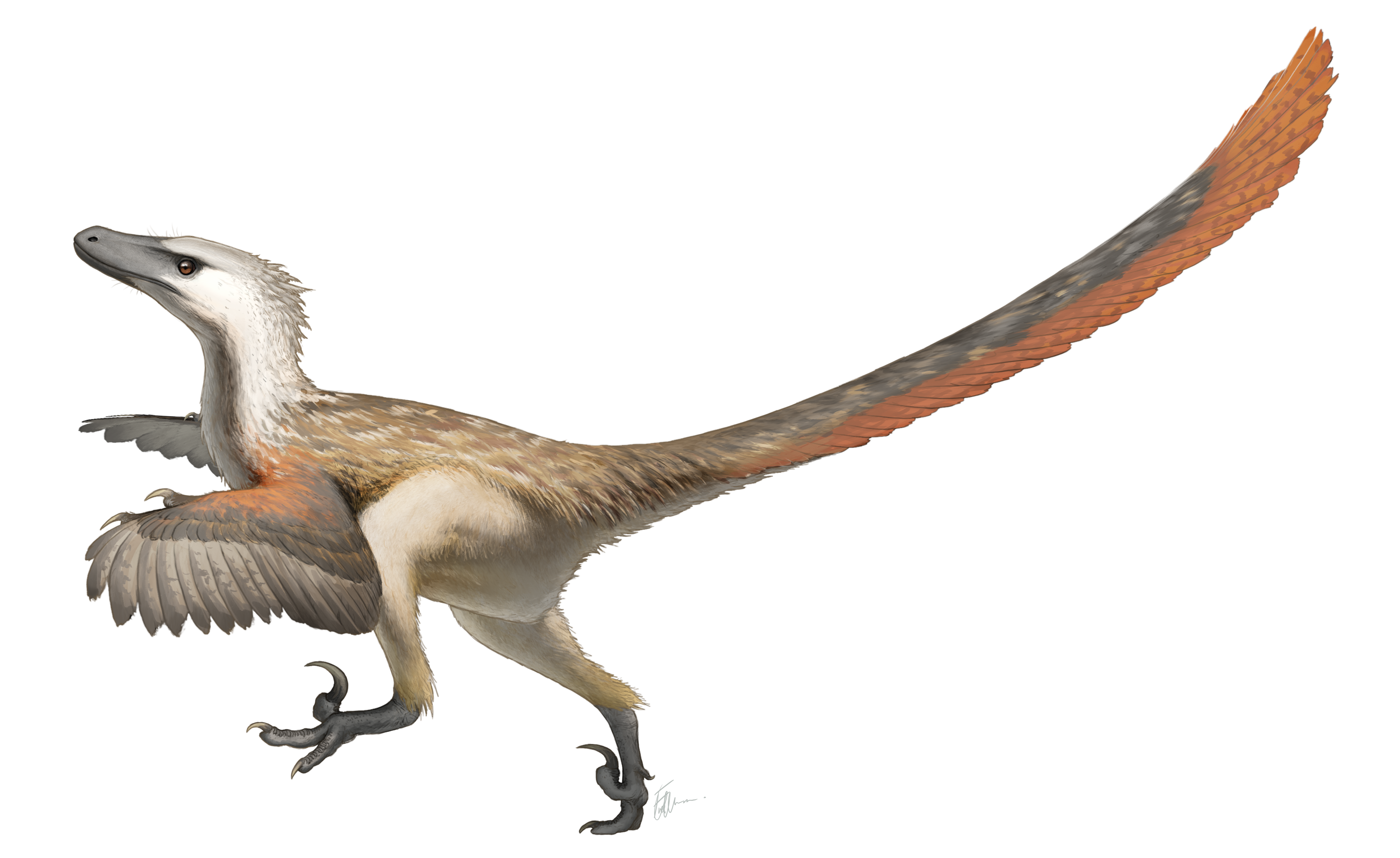
Life restoration of an actual Velociraptor, seen covered in feathers

Paleontologist Jack Horner served as dinosaur consultant for the films. Part of the kitchen scene in the first film was initially going to depict the raptors with forked tongues, like snakes. Horner objected to this, saying it would have been scientifically inaccurate, in part because it would imply a link with cold-blooded reptiles. Instead, Spielberg opted to feature a raptor snorting onto a kitchen-door window, fogging it up. This would keep with the idea that dinosaurs were warm-blooded.

Like their fictional counterparts, real raptors are believed to have been intelligent, although paleontologist James I. Kirkland, who discovered Utahraptor, considered this trait exaggerated in the films. Their depiction as pack-hunters was inspired by Deinonychus fossils which suggested such behavior. However, later research on fossilized Deinonychus teeth suggests that they did not engage in pack-hunting. Like their real-life counterparts, the franchise's raptors have a large sickle-shaped toe claw, although it is debated whether this was used for disemboweling prey, a characteristic referenced in the novels and first film.

In Jurassic Park III, the concept of raptor communication was inspired by the theory that other dinosaurs, such as Parasaurolophus, were capable of sophisticated communication. Director Joe Johnston said "it's not completely outlandish that a raptor using soft tissue in its nasal area could produce some kind of sound and communicate in much the same way that birds do. There's all kinds of evidence of lots of different species of animals communicating. So, I don't think we were breaking any rules there or creating something that was scientifically impossible".

Before the release of Jurassic Park III, most paleontologists theorized that Velociraptor had feathers like modern birds. For the third film, the appearance of the male raptors was updated to depict them with a row of small quills on their heads and necks, as suggested by Horner. Paleontologist Robert T. Bakker, who was an early pioneer of the dinosaur-bird connection, said in 2004 that the feather quills in Jurassic Park III "looked like a roadrunner's toupee", although he noted that feathers were difficult to animate.

Jurassic World received criticism for its outdated depiction of featherless Velociraptors, a design choice that was made to maintain consistency with earlier films. Horner said "we knew Velociraptor should have feathers and be more colorful, but we couldn't really change that look because everything goes back to the first movie". Velociraptor is also depicted holding its front limbs in an outdated manner, not supported by scientific findings. Research has also found that the real animal lacked the flexible tails and snarling facial expressions that are depicted in the film.

== Production background ==
In the first film, the raptors were created through a combination of animatronics by Winston and CGI by Industrial Light & Magic (ILM). A fully functioning raptor head took Winston four months to create. Two raptor animatronics were created; one with a tail and one without a tail. Because the tail required four puppeteers to control, the tailless animatronic was created to save labor when the tail did not have to be within the shot. The eyes of the animatronics were radio-controlled, and the tails were controlled by hidden rods. Because each animatronic required so many puppeteers to operate, no shot in the kitchen sequence ever had both Velociraptors portrayed by animatronics; at most, one would be animatronic, and the other would be portrayed through other means. In addition to the two main animatronics, there were a number of others made for specific purposes, including a floppy puppet, an armatured robot used for CGI reference, and a locking-joint animatronic used when the Velociraptor needed to leap. Additionally, an insert head with extra facial articulation, which was used for all Velociraptor scenes but especially when its head rose into frame, was attached to a Steadicam rig.

The Velociraptors were also depicted by men in suits for certain scenes, including the death of Muldoon. John Rosengrant, a member of Winston's team, had to bend over to fit inside the raptor suit for the kitchen scene. The suit, which had a zipper, took only ten minutes to wear. Filming lasted up to four hours at a time; Rosengrant said: "My back would go out after about 30 minutes, and that was after having trained a couple of hours a day for weeks". Winston's team created a body cast of Rosengrant, and then molded the Velociraptor suit around that cast. Mark "Crash" McCreery, another member of Winston's team, also sometimes performed in the suit. The suits were completely airtight, so an air line had to be fed in through the raptor legs to provide oxygen. Rosengrant said that his "head was at the base of the neck with the raptor head extending up above it", and the production crew carved two slits in the neck to serve as eye holes. The raptor's head was controlled by manipulating rods inside the neck. The performers also used a small monitor to keep track of what was happening onset. The arms and tail of the suits were controlled by cable, both of which ran through the legs. Running wires through the legs was not a problem since all shots involving a Velociraptor suit were cut off at the knees. Suit shots that required feet used a different suit, with the operators strapped to a rig hooked to the camera dolly. The rig was costumed up to the operator's waist, with the operator's feet going up to the Velociraptor's legs, and the raptor feet underneath that. The toes of the Velociraptor were controlled by a team of puppeteers, who were also on the rig along with the operator and camera dolly. Rosengrant and McCreery patterned their movement on Phil Tippett's animatics, particularly emphasizing birdlike movements, which Spielberg preferred.

The kitchen scene also utilized animatronics and post-production CGI. Winston considered it the most complicated sequence in the film, in part because of the many effects involved. The kitchen set was designed much larger than it would be in real life, in order to accommodate the oversized raptors. The animatronics required numerous operators, and the film crew struggled to keep them out of frame while shooting, despite the kitchen's large design. In the film's climax, one of the Velociraptors enters the visitor center from behind a plastic screen. The original plan for that shot was for the Velociraptor to tear through the screen with its claws, so razors were built into the prosthetic claws of the raptor suit for that scene. However, Rosengrant, who was operating the suit, accidentally caught the nose of the raptor head on the sheet, causing the sheet to lift up. The filmmakers felt that this was more authentically animalistic, so it was kept in the film, and the slashing scene was never filmed. Models of the raptors, standing 18 inches, were gifted to cast and crew members after production wrapped.

Aside from the adults, a Velociraptor hatchling also appears early in the film. Initially, there was to be a Triceratops hatchling and an older raptor baby, the latter of which would playfully crawl up Tim Murphy's arm. This would be done with practical effects from Winston, but he deemed the scene a major challenge because it required the raptor's entire body be visible. The scene was eventually altered to feature the raptor hatching from an egg; this was done with an animatronic, although inserting the internal mechanisms proved challenging due to the dinosaur's small size. The resulting animatronic had somewhat spastic movements, but this was consistent with how newborns move. Seven puppeteers controlled the baby raptor from below the laboratory set. Because the animatronic was so small, it was difficult to cram all of the required mechanisms inside. The animatronic was designed to be lightweight, with a core made of fiberglass cloth and foam skin, and the pull wires to operate the moving parts were only 12/1000th of an inch in diameter. The egg was slush-cast and made of wax, with a layer of Saran wrap that was pre-scored in the inside to make it crack easily. The actors in the scene had not previously seen the raptor emerge from its egg, so their reactions were genuine.

Multiple variations of additional scenes featuring a baby Velociraptor were included in early drafts of the film, but none made it to the final cut. In the original novel, during the Velociraptor attack on the visitor center, the hatchling from earlier in the film is seen getting torn up and eaten by two adult raptors. In an early draft by production designer Rick Carter, this is modified to one of the adult raptors carrying it away from danger in a protective manner, which Carter described as a Spielbergian, more optimistic twist to the scene in the novel. Another cut scene involved Grant, Lex, and Tim walking through a lava field to reunite an injured baby raptor with its family.

A tiger stripe design was considered for the raptors, but this was discarded early in the film's development, and would later be incorporated in the sequel for the male raptors. The Lost World: Jurassic Park used a mechanical version of the raptor, created by Winston, to depict the animal's upper body. A full-motion raptor was also created through CGI. One scene depicts the raptors walking through a field of tall grass as they hunt mercenaries; the film crew used bobsleds to transport the on-set raptors. In addition to the regular raptors, a "super-raptor" had also been considered for inclusion in the film, but director Spielberg rejected the idea, saying it was "a little too much out of a horror movie. I didn't want to create an alien". For Jurassic Park III, the raptors were given more colorful designs and elongated snouts. Animatronics by Winston were again used for the third film, and a partial raptor suit was also made for a scene depicting the death of Udesky.

Jurassic World underwent a lengthy development period. By 2004, writers William Monahan and John Sayles had written drafts that featured Nick Harris, a former mercenary who takes a job training a team of five Deinonychus to go on missions. This idea was suggested by executive producer Spielberg, who believed that it still had potential despite rejecting the early drafts. When Colin Trevorrow joined the project as director, he felt that the plot aspect of trained raptors was too extreme, as it depicted the animals being used for missions. Trevorrow reduced the level of cooperation that the raptors would have with their trainer. Early in the film, the raptors are being trained to not eat a live pig located in their enclosure; Trevorrow said that this "was as far as we should be able to go" with the concept of trained raptors. Owen's relationship with the raptors was inspired by real-life relationships that humans have with dangerous animals such as lions and alligators. Owen and Blue are shown to have a close bond throughout the Jurassic World trilogy. Chris Pratt, who portrays Owen, compared the relationship to that of a parent and child.

The raptors in Jurassic World were each given different designs inspired by those used in the previous films. Their onscreen appearances were created primarily through motion capture, allowing for a greater level of individuality compared with previous raptors. A full-sized raptor model from the first film was also provided by Legacy Effects to ILM as a reference. The model weighed approximately 500 lb (230 kg) and measured approximately six feet (1.8 m) tall and twelve to fourteen feet (3.7 to 4.3 m) long. Life-size maquettes were also used during scenes in which the raptors are caged.

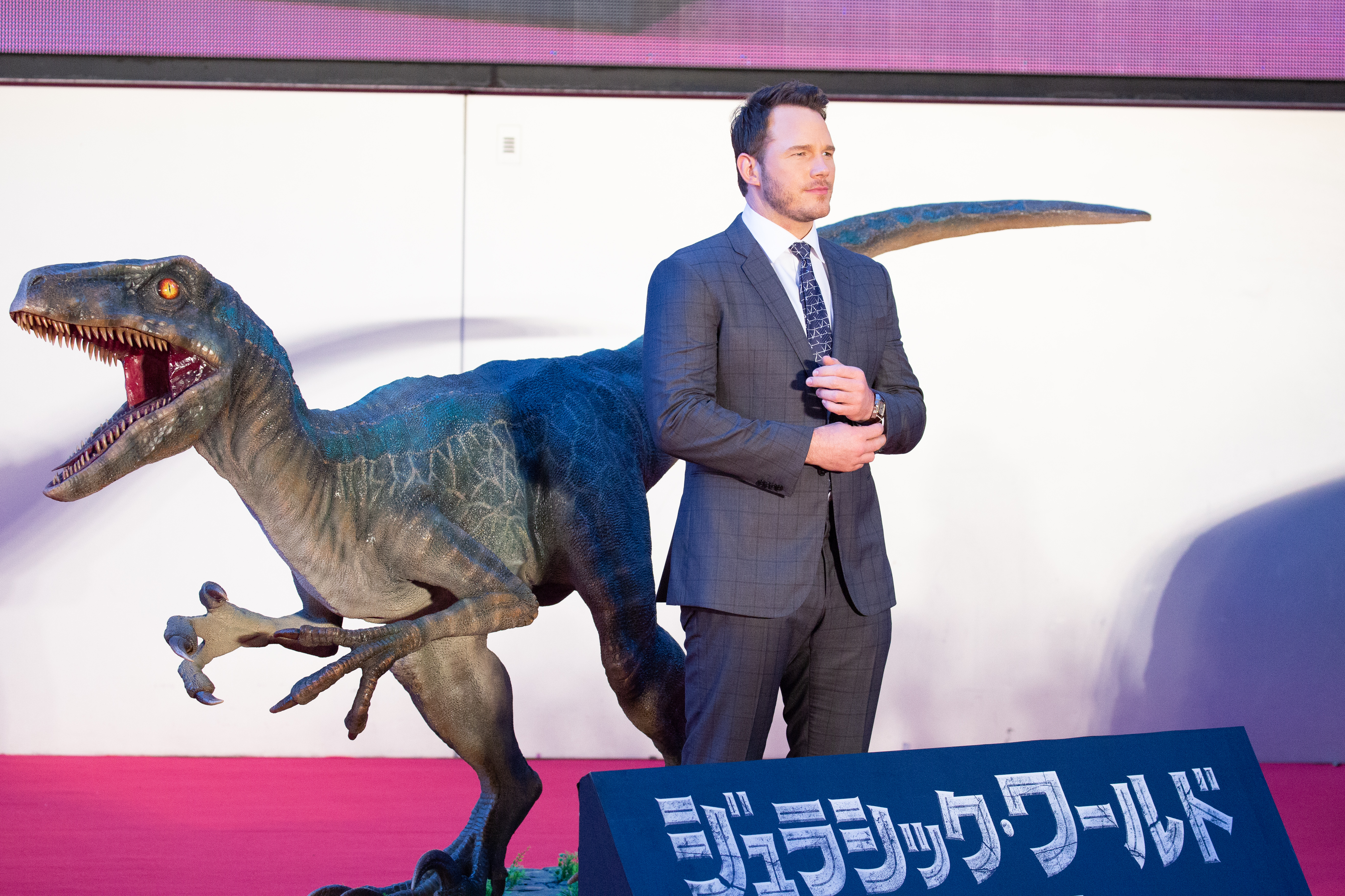
Chris Pratt, actor of Owen Grady, with a statue of Blue at the Japanese premier of Fallen Kingdom

For Fallen Kingdom, Neal Scanlan's team created a Blue animatronic that was laid on an operating table, for a scene depicting the animal after an injury. The animatronic was operated by a dozen puppeteers hidden under the table. The scene was shot with and without the animatronic, and the two versions were combined during post-production. The animatronic was made of foam latex skin built around a skeleton-like frame controlled by a combination of cable systems, rods and, in the case of some of the smaller areas of movement, radio signals. Actress Daniella Pineda, who portrayed Dr. Zia Rodriguez in the scene, said about the animatronic: "It would sweat, its eyes would dilate if hit by light, it had pulsing veins, it felt like reptile skin. It was just the most realistic thing that I'd ever worked with, and it felt like I was working with a real animal."

To create Blue's CGI appearances, the ILM animators referred to the previous film. David Vickery of ILM said that Blue's movements were designed to resemble a dog: "You look at the way Blue cocks her head and looks up at you. It's exactly like a dog. You're trying to sort of connect the dinosaur with things that you understand as a human". Small puppets were also used to depict Owen's raptors as babies.

For Dominion, Beta's small size presented an ideal opportunity for practical effects as opposed to CGI. Beta was portrayed with the use of a puppet, created by effects artist John Nolan. It was controlled by three puppeteers, who studied and replicated Blue's walking patterns, the latter animated by ILM.

=== Audio ===
The sounds of tortoises mating were among the noises used to create the audio for the raptors in Jurassic Park

The various raptor vocals in the first film were created by combining the sounds of dolphin screams, walruses bellowing, an African crane's mating call and human rasps. Mating tortoises provided the sound of raptors communicating with each other. Sound designer Gary Rydstrom said, "I recorded that at Marine World … the people there said, 'Would you like to record these two tortoises that are mating?' It sounded like a joke, because tortoises mating can take a long time. You've got to have plenty of time to sit around and watch and record them."

Other animal sounds were used as well. A hissing goose provided the noise that a raptor makes just before it kills Muldoon, while a breathing horse was used as the sound when a raptor fogs up the kitchen-door window. Various baby animals provided the sound effects for a newborn raptor, including owls and foxes. According to Rydstrom, "I already knew what the adult raptor would sound like, that it would have this screechy, raspy sound, so I tried to find a baby animal that has that rasp in it."

For Jurassic Park III, new raptor vocals were created from bird sounds. Audio recordings of penguins and toucans provided the vocals in Jurassic World. The sound effects of the raptors moving around were created by sound editor Benny Burtt, who attached microphones to his shoelaces and tromped around Skywalker Ranch, the film's sound-recording facility. For Blue's operation in Fallen Kingdom, penguin noises were modified to create a purring sound.

== Reception ==
The film adaptation of Jurassic Park popularized Velociraptor among the general public, and led to the naming of the Toronto Raptors, a professional basketball team formed in 1995. The kitchen scene in the first film is one of the most popular in the series.

Mick LaSalle of SFGATE praised a raptor sequence in The Lost World: Jurassic Park, in which the animals terrorize humans at an InGen worker village. Owen Gleiberman of Entertainment Weekly found the sequence "nicely done, with some vivid, funny moments" but also "less ingenious than the first film's choreographed kitchen showdown". Neal Karlen of the Los Angeles Times praised the raptors in Crichton's novel The Lost World, calling them "seemingly meaner, more loathsome, and once again better developed than almost all of the book's human characters".

In his review of Jurassic Park III, Adam B. Vary of Entertainment Weekly wrote of the raptors, "We're meant to be wowed by their lethal intelligence, but all I could think of was how routine their prancing quick-draw movements had become. You can call a raptor a genius, but minus Spielberg's playfully sinister hide-and-seek choreography, he's just a lizard with an attitude". Matt Goldberg of Collider later wrote in 2015 that "whereas Spielberg conveyed the raptors' intelligence by showing their attack patterns, Jurassic Park III is overly excited to let you know they can vocally speak to each other, which ends up just looking funny. It feels like we're missing subtitles". Justin Harp of Digital Spy wrote that Johnston "deserves much credit for reinventing the threat of the raptors in such a genuinely nerve-thrashing way".

After the release of Jurassic World, Blue became a fan-favorite character. Ian Cardona of Comic Book Resources described Blue as "the Jurassic Park franchise's most important character", beating out Owen Grady, Alan Grant, and Tyrannosaurus rex. He wrote, "We may have all started fearful of the Velociraptors, but now we all want one for a pet. And that's all because of Blue. She has become an essential part of Jurassic World, of its DNA and of its story". Miles Surrey of The Ringer wrote that the Jurassic World films "completely changed the audience's perception of raptors. Man's biggest dino-nightmare is suddenly man's best dino-friend."

Ian Sandwell, writing for Digital Spy, was critical of the tamed raptor portrayal: "In one stroke, the series removed one of its most terrifying threats and, by extension, a lot of the threat that the dinosaurs posed, whether raptor or some other species". Likewise, John Orquiola of Screen Rant wrote that the attempt to "make Blue into a heroic and sympathetic" character "goes against everything we know about Velociraptors from Jurassic Park". He also criticized Dominion's hopeful ending of dinosaurs co-existing with humans, stating "that simply isn't the case with Velociraptors, and Blue never was, nor can she ever be, a 'heroic' dinosaur who can co-exist with humans". Devin Meenan of /Film considered the raptors more popular than the franchise's T. rex, calling them "the most persistent (and terrifying) threat in the 'Park' trilogy before being thrust into the unlikely (and ridiculous) role of hero in the following 'World' trilogy."

Gleiberman, reviewing Fallen Kingdom for Variety, called Blue the most anthropomorphic dinosaur in the film, describing her as "a keenly intelligent specimen who, with her slight smile, looks like a cross between a domesticated T. rex and E.T." Lindsey Bahr of the Associated Press wrote that Blue "has become so anthropomorphized it's actually surprising she doesn't just start talking".

ScreenRant's Tom Chapman wrote in 2017 that Velociraptors "made Jurassic Park the franchise it is today". Joe George, writing for Den of Geek in 2022, ranked the raptors as the second-best dinosaurs in the film series: "Everyone going into Jurassic Park in 1993 knew what a T-Rex was, but very few of us were aware of raptors". He went on to call them "one of the most terrifying" dinosaurs in the series.
