= Rexy =

Jurassic Park character

- Jurassic Park character
- First appearance: Jurassic Park (book; 1990); Jurassic Park (film; 1993)
- Last appearance: Jurassic World: Chaos Theory (2025)
- Created by: Michael Crichton; Steven Spielberg
- Designed by: Stan Winston (animatronic); Steve Williams (CGI)

In-universe information
- Species: Tyrannosaurus rex
- Home: Isla Sorna; Isla Nublar; Biosyn sanctuary

Rexy is the colloquial nickname for a fictional female Tyrannosaurus that appears throughout the Jurassic Park franchise. She first appeared in Michael Crichton's 1990 novel Jurassic Park, and made her onscreen debut in the 1993 film adaptation, directed by Steven Spielberg. She returns in the 2015 film Jurassic World and its sequels, Jurassic World: Fallen Kingdom (2018) and Jurassic World Dominion (2022).

For the original film, special-effects artist Stan Winston created an animatronic T. rex measuring 20 feet high and 40 feet long, while Steve Williams of Industrial Light & Magic (ILM) created a CGI version for a majority of the scenes. Colin Trevorrow served as the primary writer and director of the Jurassic World trilogy. Although other T. rexes appeared in the preceding Jurassic Park sequels, Trevorrow sought to bring back the same individual from the first film. ILM again worked on the animal for each of the Jurassic World films. Effects artist Neal Scanlan also created an animatronic for Fallen Kingdom.

The films do not specify a name for the animal. "Rexy" came into common usage among fans after the release of Jurassic World, although the name had also been used previously in Crichton's novel. It has since been used in other licensed media. The name "Roberta" was also used by visual-effects artist Phil Tippett in his storyboards for the original film.

== Appearances ==
In the Jurassic Park novel and its film adaptation, the Tyrannosaurus is among many genetically engineered dinosaurs on the fictional Isla Nublar, the site of a planned theme park and zoo. She eventually escapes her enclosure and goes on to terrorize characters throughout the story. In the film version, she also kills Donald Gennaro. At the film's end, Velociraptors corner Alan Grant, Ellie Sattler, and Lex and Tim. However, the Tyrannosaurus unexpectedly arrives and battles the raptors, inadvertently saving the humans.

In Jurassic World, the island is home to a dinosaur theme park that has operated for years, with the Tyrannosaurus as a prime attraction. The animal has a reduced role compared with the original film, appearing primarily at the end to battle the escaped Indominus rex; she succeeds with help from a Mosasaurus and a Velociraptor named Blue. Isla Nublar is abandoned by the end of the film, leaving the Tyrannosaurus and other dinosaurs to reclaim the island as their own, once again.

In the Jurassic World Camp Cretaceous television series, which is set during and after the events of Jurassic World, the same Tyrannosaurus appears several times in the first three seasons, terrorizing a group of teenage campers who were left stranded on Isla Nublar.

The Tyrannosaurus makes several appearances throughout Jurassic World: Fallen Kingdom, which sees the dinosaurs being relocated to California for a black market auction, before eventually killing Eli Mills and escaping into the wilderness.

In the Jurassic World: Chaos Theory television series, the Tyrannosaurus appears in the fourth and final season while captured in Biosyn Valley. The events of the season take place concurrently with Jurassic World Dominion and shows the dinosaur both before and after its appearances in the film.

In Jurassic World Dominion, the Tyrannosaurus has been pursued by the California Department of Fish and Wildlife for years before being captured and sent to live at Biosyn's sanctuary in the Dolomites. There, she battles a Giganotosaurus for superiority, eventually killing the latter with the help of a Therizinosaurus. A deleted scene takes place during the Cretaceous and shows the same animals in battle during that time period, though with the Giganotosaurus prevailing; a mosquito then lands on the deceased Tyrannosaurus and sucks its blood, which would eventually be used to clone the animal in the present day. The scene is included in the film's extended edition and as part of a five-minute prologue.

== Production background ==
=== Jurassic Park ===
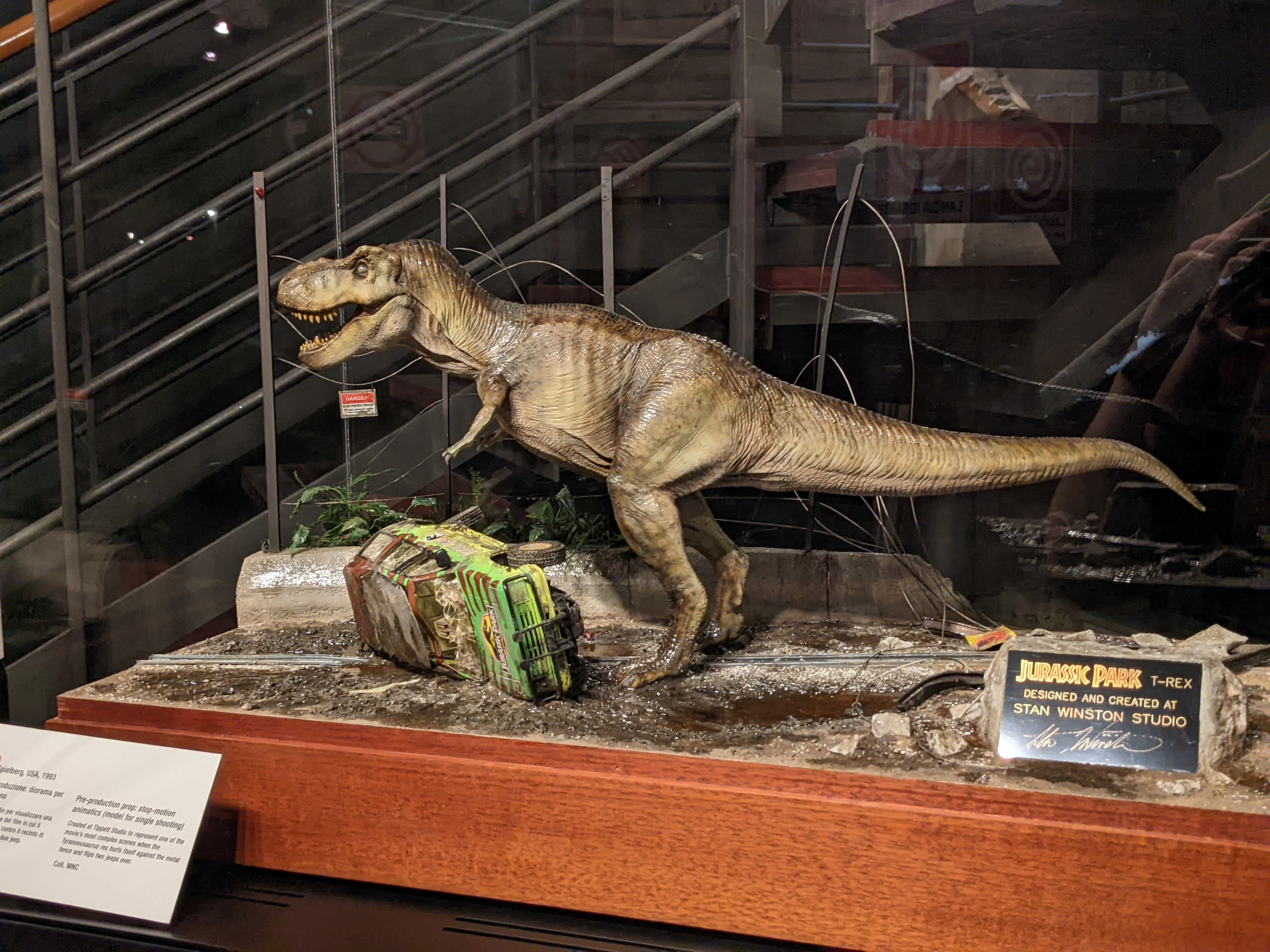
Pre-production stop-motion model of Rexy displayed at the National Museum of Cinema of Turin, Italy.

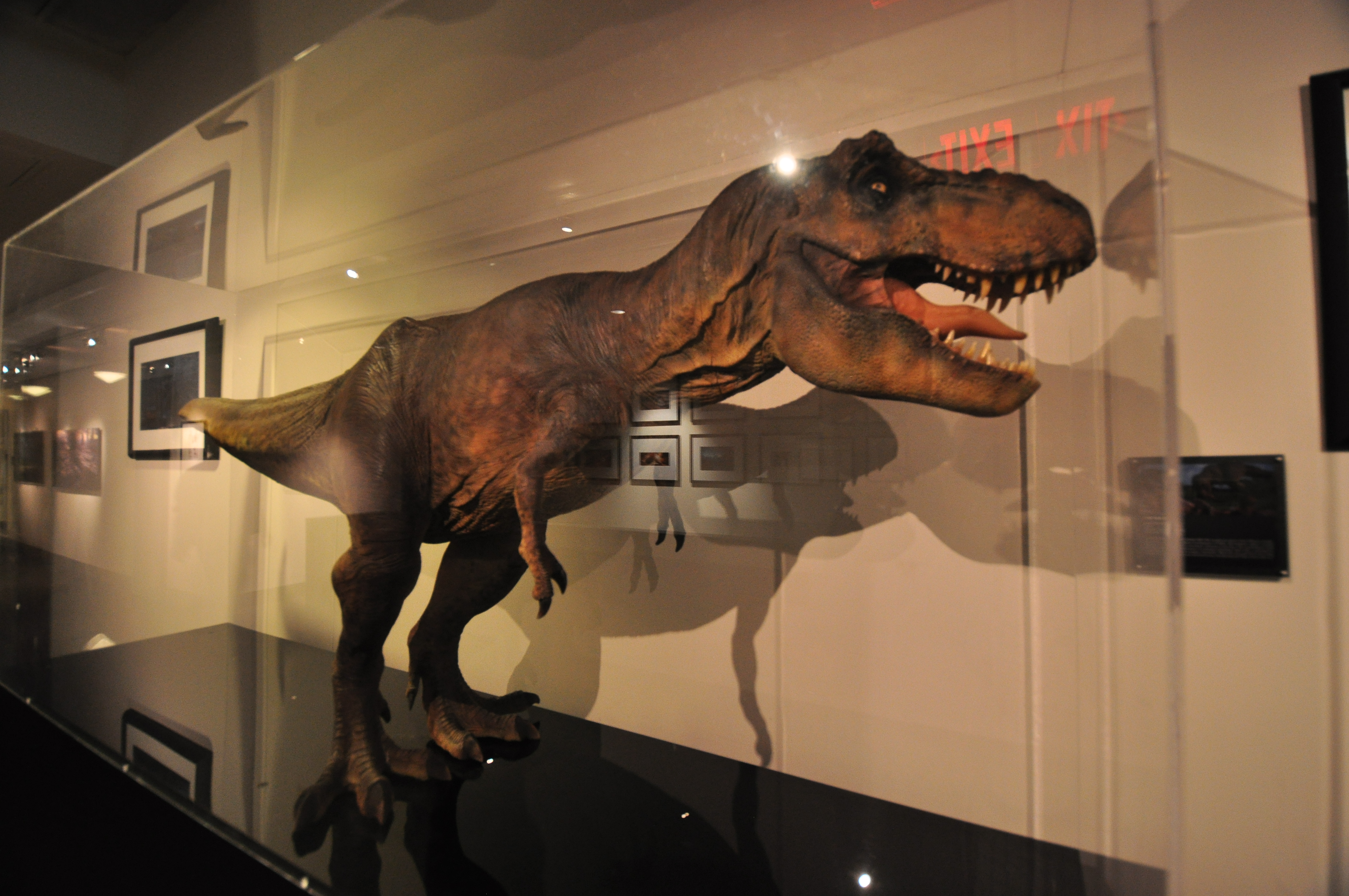
A model that was used as reference for the animatronic Rexy in Jurassic Park, kept at Industrial Light & Magic's headquarters in San Francisco.

Special-effects artist Stan Winston worked on the dinosaurs for the first film. The initial plan for the T. rex was to build separate moving full-size body parts, such as the head, tail, and feet, in addition to a miniature puppet for when the T. rex needed to be fully on-screen, and a sleeping T. rex body, which would not have to move. This was done for budgetary purposes, as it was believed that a full moving T. rex animatronic would be too expensive to build. However, Winston felt that only having disconnected full-size parts would be difficult to shoot, and Spielberg agreed. He decided to cut the scene that would have required the sleeping T. rex, so that the money that would have been spent on building it could instead go towards making a full animatronic.

The animatronic T. rex that Winston's team created stood 20 feet (6.1 m), weighed 9,000 pounds (4,100 kg), and was 40 feet (12 m) long. At the time, it was the largest sculpture ever made by Stan Winston Studio. Winston had to purchase a second studio building, which then had to have its roof lifted to allow room for the construction of the animatronic. To build the framework of the full animatronic, segments of the full framework were built of plywood and then connected together, with all the additional material being added on top afterwards. There were a total of 25 segments; nine segmenting the head-to-tail portion, six for each leg, and two for each arm.

The full-size animatronic was made of fiberglass, foam latex, and clay, with the head, torso, and tail connected to a modified flight simulator, custom-made by McFadden Systems. The flight simulator allowed for large movements, but it also produced enormous amounts of torque, to such a degree that the system would crack the walls and floor of the stage if improperly secured. Special effects supervisor Michael Lantieri prevented this by mounting it to a tower with air bearings that was drilled several feet into the bedrock below the stage, and secured with poured concrete. The tower was difficult to move, so filming was arranged in order to minimize the number of times the animatronic had to move; it was only moved four times in the course of shooting.

Eight sculptors worked on the T. rex over the course of sixteen weeks, and ensured that the work was consistent amongst them by all using identical tools. Scaffolding was built around the animatronic so that sculptors could reach high areas, and most of the work was done with one sculptor standing on the scaffolding while another guided them from below. It was painted using airbrushes, and in muted colors to ensure that it looked realistic. The head was painted a darker color in order to contrast the eyes and teeth, making them seem brighter and more prominent.

The animatronic's large body movements were programmed through the flight simulator, while other movements, with the exception of the radio-controlled eyes, were controlled by hydraulics. Because Winston's crew were inexperienced with hydraulics, they brought in several hydraulics engineers to assist them with the design. In total, the hydraulics in the animatronic required over 200 horsepower to run. The animatronic was so large that standard fiberglass and silicone molds were too small, so Winston's team made larger molds out of epoxy from the aerospace industry. Jack Horner, the film's paleontological consultant, called the animatronic "the closest I've ever been to a live dinosaur".

A fifth-scale version of the animatronic, referred to as a "Waldo", was puppeteered by four puppeteers, and a computer logged the movements, which was then copied by the full-size animatronic. A total of twelve operators were required to operate the animatronic. The motions were mostly puppeteered on the Waldo live during filming, except when the animatronic had to interact directly with humans, in which case the movement was pre-programmed for safety purposes. The animatronic had a tendency to shake and wobble after completing a motion because of the torque, which the team solved by putting in accelerometers, which would play the reverse of any movement detected and cancel out the wobble. When powered down, the T. rex would revert to its powered-down position, and all of the hydraulics and metal sheets inside would move. The studio had a blackout while a crew member was inside of the animatronic, causing all of the metal internal parts to shift and putting the crew member in grave danger. Fortunately for him, he narrowly avoided serious injury, and the crew was able to pry open the jaws of the T. rex and retrieve him.

In addition to the main animatronic, Winston's team built another two. One of them was made for leg shots and included the underbelly, legs, and tail of the T. rex. It had been designed to be able to walk, but the designers had failed to account for the rain-drenched set being muddy. As a result, the legs were unable to gain any traction in the mud and slipped, rendering the walking ability unusable. The other was only a head, but had additional detailing and a wider range of facial motion, to be used for close-up shots. It was controlled by a crane and had an extendable tongue, as well as eyes that would contract automatically when exposed to light.

The animatronic was used in a scene set during a storm, depicting the T. rex as she breaks free from her enclosure. Shooting the scene was difficult because the foam rubber skin of the animatronic would absorb water, causing the dinosaur to shake from the extra weight. In between takes, Winston's team had to dry off the dinosaur in order to proceed with filming. Winston stated that his worst moment on Jurassic Park was when the jaw of the animatronic broke in the middle of the night between shoots, necessitating his crew to work through the night and into the morning to repair it. The jaw was fixed so quickly that filming was only delayed half a day.

Winston's team initially created a miniature sculpture of the T. rex, serving as a reference for the construction of the full-sized animatronic. Industrial Light & Magic (ILM) scanned this sculpture to create CGI shots of the animal. One particular challenge was on the sequence of the T. rex chasing the Jeep, which used the CGI model. The animators found that making the T. rex too fast would make it feel lightweight and small, while slowing it down made it feel bigger but drained the chase of intensity. They solved this by cheating the motion; the T. rex would move slowly, but take implausibly enormous steps, so that it covered ground quickly while still feeling large. The T. rex roar was created by combining the sounds of a baby elephant, a tiger, and an alligator.

In the first film, the T. rex was originally supposed to be killed off. Halfway through filming, director Steven Spielberg realized that the T. rex was the star of the film and decided to have the script changed just before shooting the death scene. The changes resulted in the final ending, in which the T. rex inadvertently saves the human characters by killing a pack of velociraptors. Spielberg had the ending changed out of fear that the original ending, without the T. rex, would disappoint audiences.

=== Jurassic World trilogy ===
Although preceding Jurassic Park sequels had featured other T. rexes, Colin Trevorrow sought to bring back the same individual from the first film. Trevorrow, primary writer and director for the trilogy, said about the T. rex's return, "We took the original design and obviously, technology has changed. So, it's going to move a little bit differently, but it'll move differently because it's older. And we're giving her some scars and we're tightening her skin. So, she has that feeling of, like, an older Burt Lancaster". Motion capture was used to portray the T. rex, and a full-scale foot was created for lighting reference and to help with framing shots.

For its appearance in Fallen Kingdom, ILM sent Neal Scanlan the T. rex model previously used for Jurassic World. Using the model, Scanlan created a full-scale 3D print of the T. rex head and shoulders. The life-size T. rex animatronic, which had the ability to breathe and move its head, was controlled with joysticks. It was used for a scene where the sedated T. rex is inside a cage, while Owen Grady and Claire Dearing attempt to retrieve blood from her for a transfusion to help Blue. The beginning shots of the scene were created using only the animatronic, while the ending shots solely used CGI. The middle portion of the scene used a combination of the two methods. Trevorrow said about the dinosaur, "We've been following this same character since the beginning; she's the same T. rex that was in Jurassic Park and in Jurassic World. She is iconic—not just because she's a T. rex, but because she's this T. rex".

Speaking about Dominion, Trevorrow described the Cretaceous fight as an origin story for the T. rex "in the way we might get to do in a superhero film. The T-Rex is a superhero for me". Regarding its death to the Giganotosaurus, Trevorrow called it "such a horrifying loss for all of us who grew up with the T. rex. To build this into something that feels like a revenge picture that takes place over 65 million years was one of my favorite ideas that we had". At the end of Dominion, the T. rex encounters two other tyrannosaurs, which Trevorrow confirmed as the same duo featured in The Lost World: Jurassic Park (1997). Trevorrow said he wanted to "really make the audience want her to find peace. We want her to find a home. She feels like she has been constantly displaced, time and time again. For her to find a family and sense of belonging is what I want".

For Dominion, Trevorrow wanted to reuse the animatronic T. rex from Fallen Kingdom. However, it had already deteriorated, as is common for animatronics. Instead, the animal was portrayed entirely through CGI. Previous Jurassic World films depicted the T. rex with an emaciated physical appearance compared with the first Jurassic Park. Trevorrow sought to restore her original design for Dominion. ILM located Softimage 3D files of the original T. rex model from 1992 and compared it with their modern high-resolution model, as well as images of Winston's original maquette. Changes were made to the animal's jaw, eyes, and brow ridges. David Vickery of ILM said, "The idea was literally to restore her to her former glory," stating further that fans reacted positively to the changes: "They're like, [gasps] 'Hang on, they've changed T. rex. She looks amazing!'"

== Scientific accuracy ==
A scene in the first film depicts the T. rex chasing a Jeep. Animator Steve Williams said he decided to "throw physics out the window and create a T. rex that moved at sixty miles per hour even though its hollow bones would have busted if it ran that fast". In the film, it is stated that the T. rex has been recorded running as fast as 32 miles per hour, although scientists believe that its actual top speed would have ranged from 12 to 25 miles per hour. In the novel and its film adaptation, it is stated that the T. rex has vision based on movement, but later studies indicate that the dinosaur had binocular vision, like a bird of prey.

The physical appearance of the T. rex in the Jurassic World films is contrary to new discoveries about the dinosaur. For consistency, the films have continued to depict the dinosaur with its wrists pointing downward at an unnatural angle, whereas the real animal had its wrists facing sideways toward each other. The Jurassic World Dominion prologue features the animal lightly covered in protofeathers.

== Name ==
Two tyrannosaurs are featured in Crichton's novel: a juvenile and an adult. Robert Muldoon, the theme park's game warden, refers to the adult on several occasions as "Rexy". Visual-effects artist Phil Tippett had worked on the original film, and his storyboards referred to the T. rex as "Roberta". The films themselves do not specify a name for the animal. Following the release of Jurassic World, fans began referring to the individual as "Rexy". The name was later used in the 2018 novel The Evolution of Claire, and is also used by Sammy, a character in Camp Cretaceous.

== Reception ==
Writing for Screen Rant in 2017, Tom Chapman ranked the franchise's T. rexes, including "Rexy", among its greatest characters. In 2020, Rafarl Sarmiento from Screen Rant listed the T. rex as the best dinosaur in the franchise: "The T-Rex is both awe-inspiring and horrific, but at the end of the day, it's just an animal (that actually existed) fulfilling its instinct. Yet it carries an aura of grand showmanship, something that really represents the spectacle that Jurassic Park could offer." In response to fan criticism about the T. rex being portrayed as weak in battles, Trevorrow noted that this individual would be near the end of its life during the Jurassic World films.
