= Jurassic World Dominion prologue =

2021 prologue to Jurassic World Dominion

- Promotional release poster
- Directed by: Colin Trevorrow
- Written by: Colin Trevorrow; Emily Carmichael
- Cinematography: John Schwartzman
- Edited by: Mark Sanger
- Music by: Michael Giacchino
- Production company: Amblin Entertainment
- Distributed by: Universal Pictures
- Release dates: June 25, 2021 (U.S. IMAX release); November 23, 2021 (online)
- Running time: 5 minutes
- Country: United States

A five-minute prologue to the 2022 film Jurassic World Dominion was released in 2021, initially as an IMAX-exclusive preview and later as an online short film. It is the second live-action short film in the Jurassic Park franchise, following Battle at Big Rock (2019). The prologue includes a prehistoric segment set during the Cretaceous, depicting various dinosaurs in their natural habitats. The sequence was shot on the island of Socotra, part of Yemen. The prologue also includes a modern-day sequence – filmed in England and set in California – in which a Tyrannosaurus rex terrorizes a drive-in theater while evading capture.

The footage debuted in June 2021, as a promotional preview attached to IMAX showings of F9. Director Colin Trevorrow had shot the footage to serve as the first five minutes of Jurassic World Dominion, before cutting it from the final film due to time constraints. The footage was released online on November 23, 2021, to promote the main film ahead of its theatrical release on June 10, 2022. The footage has since been restored in the film's extended edition, released to home media on August 16, 2022.

== Plot ==
The prologue features a prehistoric segment that takes place 65 million years ago during the Cretaceous. It introduces several new creatures to the Jurassic Park film series, and depicts them in their natural habitats: Dreadnoughtus trudging through and around a lake, a Quetzalcoatlus and Pteranodons scavenging on corpses and diving into an entrenched river, Ankylosaurus drinking from a watering hole, an Oviraptor stealing eggs in a cave, a herd of Nasutoceratops wading across a river, (Note: Nasutoceratops had previously appeared in the 2019 short film Battle at Big Rock.) and a Moros and a Giganotosaurus in a symbiotic relationship.

The prehistoric segment ends in a showdown between the Giganotosaurus and a partly feathered Tyrannosaurus rex. A nearby Iguanodon flees the area while the two carnivores battle, with the Giganotosaurus killing the Tyrannosaurus. A mosquito sucks the blood of the Tyrannosaurus, setting up the franchise's premise, in which ancient DNA is recovered from amber-preserved mosquitoes to engineer dinosaurs.

The prologue skips to northern California during the present day, in which the original Jurassic Park Tyrannosaurus is pursued by rangers in a helicopter belonging to the United States Fish and Wildlife Service, following her escape at the end of Jurassic World: Fallen Kingdom (2018). Fleeing in panic, she enters a drive-in theatre and causes havoc while evading the helicopter in confusion. A ranger attempts to tranquilise the T. rex, but she escapes into nearby woods.

== Production ==
Like the main film, the prologue was directed by Colin Trevorrow, was co-written by him and Emily Carmichael, and features a score by Michael Giacchino.

The prehistoric segment was shot by a second unit crew entirely on the island of Socotra, a location that Trevorrow had been interested in for some time. He liked the island's unique plant life and said: "The idea that we're able to put the oldest creatures known into a place that feels like the oldest part of the planet was fascinating to me". The segment was storyboarded by Glen McIntosh, who had worked on the previous Jurassic World films through Industrial Light & Magic (ILM). Although McIntosh had left ILM, Trevorrow desired to have him involved with the sequence, which the two men designed together. Films in the Jurassic Park franchise had never depicted dinosaurs during prehistory, something that Trevorrow had wanted to see onscreen since his childhood.

The Cretaceous segment primarily features dinosaurs co-existing peacefully. Trevorrow said "we bring our own humanity and instincts into dinosaurs, because we usually have dinosaur toys going 'raaawww'. We just make them fight, that's us. In reality, some dinosaurs are predators, but if there's a shared water source they will all come to that lake and drink together". The battle between the Giganotosaurus and T. rex, particularly its short length, was based on nature videos of present-day animals.

The dinosaurs were created through computer-generated imagery (CGI), which was handled by ILM. Trevorrow found it challenging to create the Cretaceous segment "in a way that feels tactile and alive and present, and not just like a bunch of computers rendering as quickly as they can". Explaining the level of detail on the animals, he said "we're learning a lot about lighting, every time we do this, and how we created an environment that allowed us to backlight the dinosaurs in a very warm, rich, amber tone, that just allowed light to kick off of everything".

Paleontologists Jack Horner and Steve Brusatte served as advisors for the Cretaceous segment to ensure accuracy. Prior films had shown some dinosaurs with inaccurate or outdated depictions, and Trevorrow expressed excitement for the prologue because it offered a chance to "see these dinosaurs in their paleontologically correct form" for the first time. Earlier films depicted genetically engineered dinosaurs whose genomes were completed with frog DNA, explaining any inaccuracies in their appearance and behavior. The prologue introduced feathered dinosaurs to the film series, including Moros intrepidus, a small member of the tyrannosaur family that was described in 2019.

The drive-in sequence was filmed during a three-day period in March 2020, at Hawley Common and Minley Woods, both in England. Helicopter filming took place on the final night of the shoot. The modern-day T. rex is the same individual featured in the previous Jurassic World films and the original Jurassic Park, and is a cloned version of the prehistoric T. rex. Trevorrow said that "it's an origin story, in the way we might get to do in a superhero film. The T-Rex is a superhero for me". The prehistoric segment sets up a present-day rivalry in the main film between a cloned Giganotosaurus and the T. rex. Trevorrow did not want children to be "traumatized" by the death of the T. rex during the Cretaceous segment, so he chose to cut away to the drive-in segment immediately to show that the animal was still alive as a clone.

== Release ==
The prologue footage was originally meant to serve as the first five minutes of Jurassic World Dominion, and was initially released as a five-minute preview of the film. The preview was attached exclusively to IMAX screenings of F9, debuting with the film on June 25, 2021, in the U.S. The preview was shown in over 40 countries, some of which debuted the footage earlier than the U.S. Attaching the footage to F9, rather than releasing it online, was done in an effort to attract customers back to movie theaters amid the COVID-19 pandemic. The IMAX preview included additional scenes at its ending, set in the present day. These included a Gallimimus running through a neighborhood, and a Mosasaurus attacking a crab-fishing boat. Another scene consisted of an alternate angle from the 2019 short film Battle at Big Rock, showing a campervan being flipped over by an Allosaurus.

Because the main film was still in post-production in June 2021, Trevorrow said he was unsure whether the preview footage would make the film's final cut. The footage was ultimately excluded from the main film due to time constraints, although Trevorrow still considered it beneficial from a storytelling perspective and wanted it to receive a wide release. The prologue was released online on November 23, 2021, as a standalone short film to promote the main film. Trevorrow said that Universal "was totally down with experimenting with sharing five minutes of finished movie as a 'prologue' six months in advance". The prologue was eventually added back into the main film in an extended edition, released on 4K Ultra HD, Blu-ray and DVD on August 16, 2022.

== Reception ==
Ryan Scott of /Film praised the CGI and wrote that it "might be some of the most impressive visual effects work not done with animatronics in any 'Jurassic' movie yet". Steve Weintraub of Collider also praised the CGI and the attention to detail on the dinosaurs. Although Simon Gallagher of Screen Rant was impressed with the CGI, he opined that the prologue tried and failed to recapture the "magic" of the original Jurassic Park film.

Some viewers were disappointed by the inclusion of outdated dinosaur theories, such as Oviraptor being portrayed as an egg-eater. Other criticism was directed at the scientific inaccuracies within the prologue with certain creatures appearing in the wrong time periods or the wrong locations, as the film is set during the latest Cretaceous, right before the Cretaceous-Paleogene extinction. The climactic battle between the Giganotosaurus and T. rex was one such example as it could not happen in real life since the two animals lived on separate continents and existed millions of years apart from each other. Science writer Riley Black of Slate was dismayed by the level of criticism and noted that various interpretations of extinct animals exist, writing: "For all we've come to learn about dinosaurs, we still know vanishingly little". British paleontologist Joe Bonsor found the dinosaur depictions to be mostly accurate or within the realm of possibility.

== See also ==
- List of films featuring dinosaurs
