= Jurassic World: The Game =

2015 video game

- Cover art
- Developer: Ludia
- Publisher: Ludia
- Series: Jurassic Park
- Platforms: iOS, Android
- Release: iOS: April 29, 2015; Android; May 12, 2015
- Genre: Simulation video game
- Mode: Single-player

Jurassic World: The Game is a 2015 construction and management simulation video game for mobile devices developed by Ludia and based on the 2015 film Jurassic World. It is a sequel to Ludia's earlier game, Jurassic Park Builder (2012), and features similar gameplay. The game is available on both iOS and Android devices.

The Chinese servers for the game shut down on January 4, 2021 making it unplayable there, but is still playable in other parts of the world.

Jam City acquired Jurassic World: The Game's developer company, Ludia, in 2021 before they sold Ludia in March 2025.

== Gameplay ==
Jurassic World: The Game is set on the fictional Costa Rican islands of Isla Nublar and Isla Sorna, where the player is put in control of creating or constructing a Jurassic World theme park. The player can add buildings and create dinosaurs to populate the park. The game features creatures like dinosaurs among other prehistoric animals.

The combat, in which the player chooses an animal to fight against a rival's animal, uses a system of action points that will increase with each turn while making use of each animals' weaknesses. Although it may appear to the player that they are facing real opponents, according to the Google Play Store, Jurassic World: The Game is single-player, which means the player is actually fighting against an artificial intelligence, posing as another human player.

By obtaining a collection of creatures, the player maintains the park by completing missions assigned to them by the characters. The player can erect buildings and decorations to increase revenue. Each rank unlocks new Battle Stages and buildings to expand the park. Throughout the game, the players are able to get Card Packs, which can give rare species, new missions or currency. Hybrid animals are available to obtain by fusing two matching dinosaurs with a reached level cap of 40, for example combining a Tyrannosaurus and a Velociraptor to form the Indominus rex. They are considerably much stronger than their predecessors. Superhybrids can in turn be created by collecting specific DNA and fusing it with an existing hybrid. The park also includes Aquatic and Cenozoic sections, with many species present that are not dinosaurs, such as the Smilodon and Mosasaurus.

The game supported the use of Hasbro's Jurassic World Brawlasaurus toys until July 2019, which could be scanned by players and incorporated into the game for battles.

== Development and release ==
Jurassic World: The Game was announced by Universal Pictures in October 2014, as part of its promotional plans for the 2015 film Jurassic World. Ludia released the game for iOS in April 2015, to coincide with the release of the film. It was released shortly after for Android in May 2015.

== Reception ==
Patrick Klepek of Kotaku criticized the game for its use of in-game advertisements.

Nadia Oxford of Gamezebo gave the game three stars out of five. Oxford noted the realistic dinosaur models, but wrote that the game "combines mediocre park-building with mediocre dino-battling. It's competent and by gosh it (mostly) looks glorious, but there isn't a lot here that differentiates the game from standard park-builders". Gamezebo considered the game to be "pretty much Jurassic Park Builder part II, except the parks you create in that three-year-old game seem a lot more colorful and joyful than the washed-out grey fairgrounds you create in Jurassic World".

GamingLives praised Jurassic World: The Game for its graphics, interface and the animations of the creatures, but criticized the game's combat element for putting the player up against opponents "you couldn't possibly defeat".
