= Production of Jurassic World =

Production of the 2015 film Jurassic World

Production of the 2015 film Jurassic World was stalled for years in development hell while the film's storyline underwent numerous revisions. Development of the film, known then as Jurassic Park IV, began in 2001. William Monahan was announced as screenwriter in 2002, and the film was scheduled for a 2005 release. When Monahan left to work on another project, he was replaced in 2004 by John Sayles. By 2005, the start of production had stalled, as executive producer Steven Spielberg was not satisfied with any of the script drafts. In 2006, Jurassic Park III director Joe Johnston was set to direct the film. After missing a 2008 release, Johnston and Spielberg intended to work on the film following the completion of their own respective film projects. Writer Mark Protosevich was hired in 2011, although two story treatments by him were rejected.

Rick Jaffa and Amanda Silver were hired in 2012 to write a draft of Jurassic Park IV that would incorporate ideas from Spielberg. Colin Trevorrow was hired as director in 2013, and the film was delayed once more, giving Trevorrow and his writing partner Derek Connolly more time to perfect the script by Jaffa and Silver. Spielberg approved the script in September 2013, and a name change to Jurassic World was announced that month. Filming occurred from April 10 to August 5, 2014, in Hawaii and Louisiana. Jurassic World was completed on May 10, 2015, and was theatrically released the following month.

== Development ==
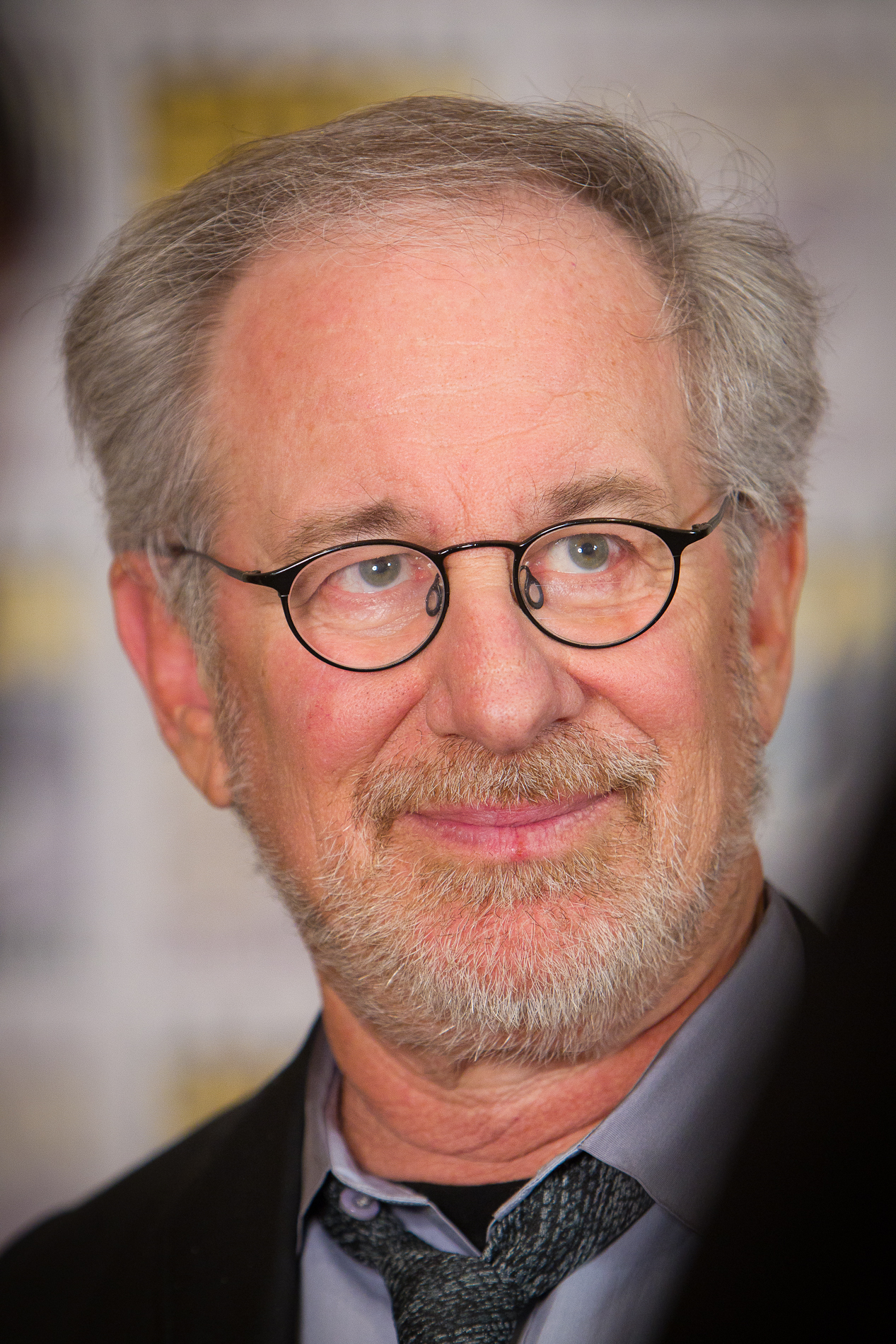
Steven Spielberg was the film's executive producer.

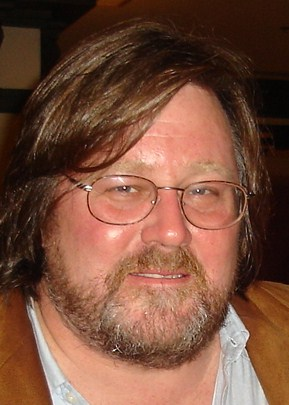
William Monahan wrote the film's first draft.

In March 2001, Jurassic Park III director Joe Johnston said he and executive producer Steven Spielberg had discussed a story idea for a fourth Jurassic Park film. Johnston was not interested in directing the next installment, although Spielberg would return as producer. It was revealed in 2022 that Spielberg's initial idea for Jurassic Park IV involved an intelligent dinosaur-human hybrid which escapes from a laboratory and rampages through a city, further exploring the concept of genetic manipulation and its effects. Spielberg believed that the idea, devised late in Jurassic Park III's production, should have been used for the third film. He considered it the best story idea since the first Jurassic Park.

Development of further ideas was underway by May 2001. A month later, Johnston announced he would not direct the film and said that Spielberg's story idea would extend the Jurassic Park series' mythology. Johnston said the film would feel like a departure from its predecessors, implying it would not be set on an island. He also said the film would not involve the escaped Pteranodons from the ending of Jurassic Park III, then later hinted it would.

Actor Sam Neill, who portrayed Dr. Alan Grant in two previous films in the series, said he could not imagine a way for his character to be involved in another film. Neill was contracted for three films; other actors from Jurassic Park III were also contracted for a potential fourth film. In April 2002, it was reported that the fourth Jurassic Park film would be the last in the series and that it would ignore events portrayed in its predecessor. In June, Spielberg confirmed plans for a fourth film, which he hoped Johnston would direct. By October 2002, Neill was being considered for a possible role in the film. The following month, William Monahan was announced as the screenwriter, with Spielberg and Kathleen Kennedy as producers. Universal Pictures would be involved in the film's production. The film was scheduled for a mid-2005 release.

In January 2003, Jeff Goldblum said he had been asked to stay available for a possible return of his character Dr. Ian Malcolm. At the end of the month, it was reported the story would partially involve dinosaurs migrating to the Costa Rican mainland. A team of experts, including Grant and Malcolm, would chart an expedition to an offshore island and discover the dinosaurs breeding freely. Part of the plot would involve the characters devising a way to restrict the spread of the dinosaurs and prevent an ecological disaster. Early concept art also depicted genetically engineered human-dinosaur mercenaries, viewed by the filmmakers as a necessary evolution of the franchise.

Stan Winston's special effects studio, which worked on the previous films, was in the design phase for the film as of April 2003. Winston intended for the special effects to be more advanced than in the previous films, for instance by creating animatronics of Velociraptors with internal motors, providing better control and movement. Winston said Spielberg wanted to adapt several unfilmed scenes from Michael Crichton's Jurassic Park novel and its sequel The Lost World. By July 2003, Keira Knightley was in consideration for two roles, including a small part as a granddaughter. Monahan's first draft of the script was finished later that month; the story was not set in a jungle, as in previous films. Filming was set to begin in 2004 in California and Hawaii. Neill confirmed that he would return, and Richard Attenborough said he would reprise his role as John Hammond.

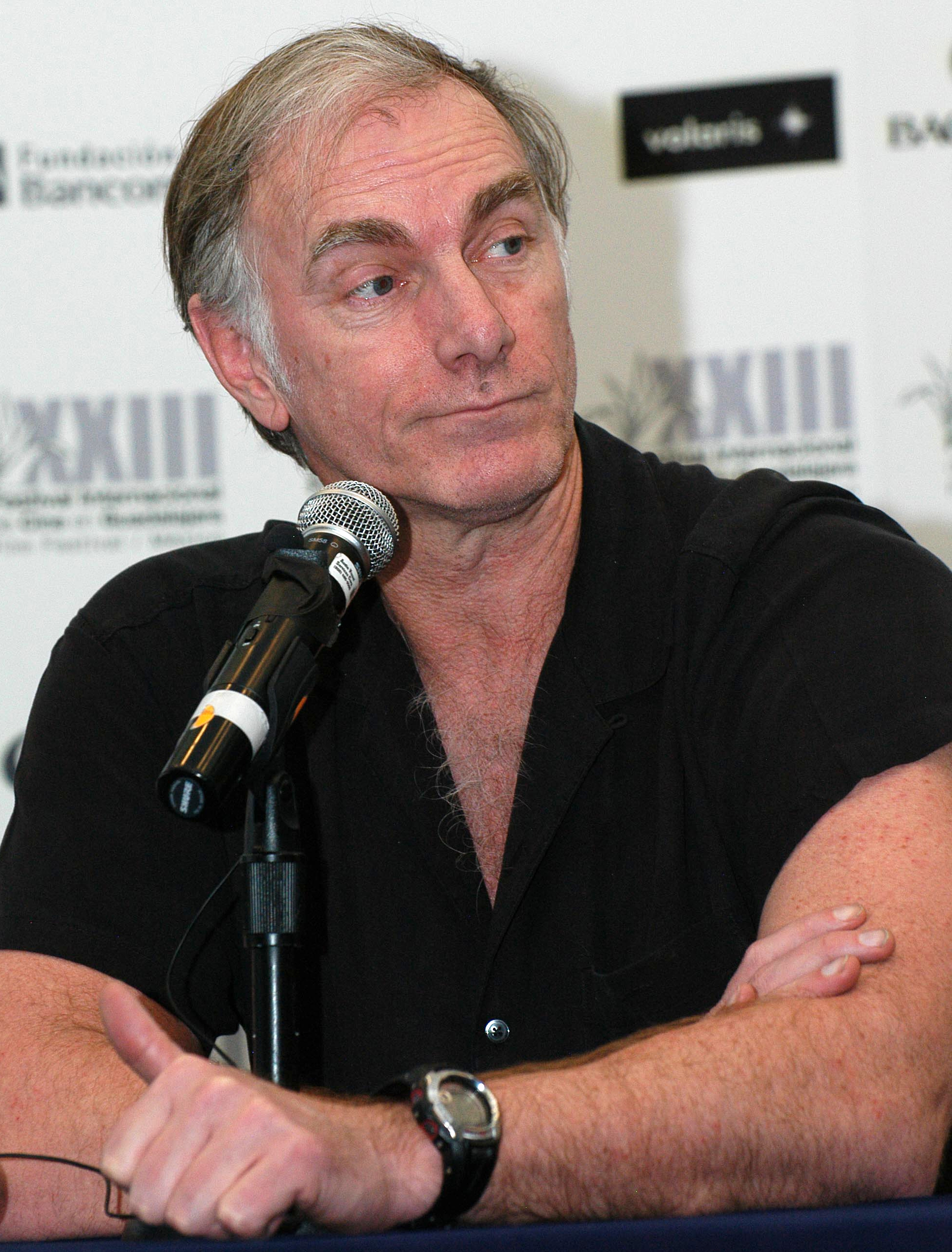
John Sayles wrote two drafts of the script in 2004.

In October 2003, paleontologist Jack Horner said he would return as technical adviser for the fourth film, and hinted that it would have a focus on Velociraptors. He was also asked about a hypothetical idea of humans evolving from dinosaurs rather than mammals; Horner responded, "Keep thinking about that, and in a couple of years go see Jurassic Park 4". In March 2004, Johnston said he had not been asked to direct the film and hoped Spielberg would direct it. Johnston said a story was being written that would take the series in a completely different direction "away from the island and away from the T. rex and all this". A month later, script doctors were being sought to work on the story, which involved dinosaurs being trained by the government to carry and use weapons in battles. As of May 2004, screenwriter John Sayles was writing the script, after being hired to finish Monahan's earlier work. Monahan had left the project to focus on Kingdom of Heaven, and later said of his work on Jurassic Park IV, "I wrote it really funny. The kids in it were like the ones in Willy Wonka."

Sayles wrote two drafts for the film. In his first draft, Isla Nublar and InGen have been taken over by Grendel Corporation, a holdings company. Creatures from the island, including Pteranodons, have begun attacking people on the mainland of Central and North America. The script featured a brief return to Isla Nublar and focused on a mercenary named Nick Harris, a new character sent by Hammond to the island to retrieve a canister of dinosaur DNA that was lost during the events of the first film. With the DNA, Hammond intends to have his scientists create a new group of infertile dinosaurs that can kill the extant ones. Harris retrieves the canister but is kidnapped and taken to Grendel's headquarters in the Swiss Alps. There, he is persuaded to help the company train a team of genetically modified Deinonychus and two Dilophosaurus for use on rescue missions and to combat drug dealers. The dinosaurs would be equipped with body armor and would use their teeth and claws as weapons. The Deinonychus would be hybrids, containing human DNA for intelligence and dog DNA for obedience. The script focused mostly on the efforts of Harris and a team of experts as they train the dinosaurs. Hammond would be the only returning character in this draft. The concept of a human who trains raptors came from Spielberg.

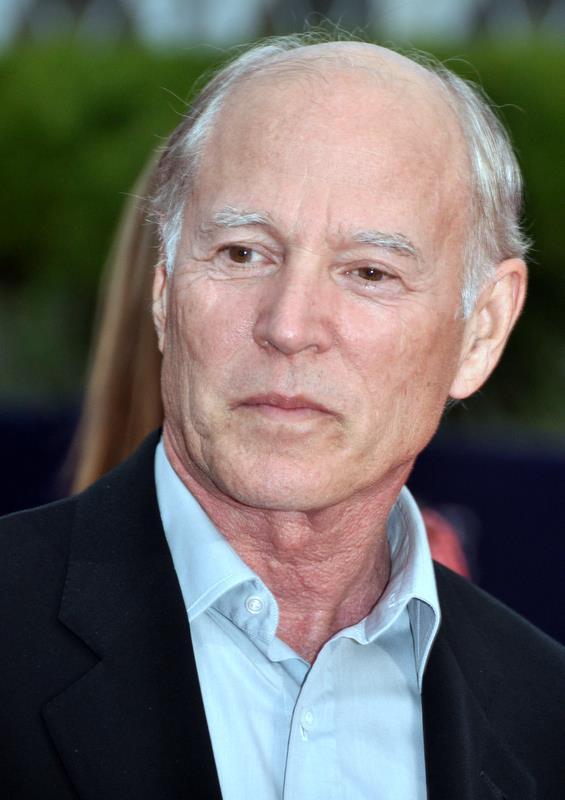
Frank Marshall produced the film.

By June 2004, Frank Marshall had joined the project as a producer, while Alex Proyas was in discussions to direct, with filming expected to begin in nine months for a late-2005 release. Filming would begin at Pinewood Studios, where a massive tank was to be constructed for scenes involving marine reptiles. In July 2004, the script was being rewritten. Jeremy Piven and Emmy Rossum were being considered for two of the lead roles, and Glen Powell auditioned as well. Later in July, Proyas said he was not interested in directing the film. In August 2004, Drew McWeeny of Ain't It Cool News published a review of Sayles's initial draft, calling it "well-written and inventive" but "bugfuck crazy". Sayles later confirmed this as an early draft, intercepted through Spielberg's email by a hacker. Sayles was still rewriting the script in September 2004, with the film on track for a late-2005 release.

=== Stalled progress ===
In April 2005, Winston confirmed the film was on hold because of repeated revisions to the script, none of which satisfied Spielberg. According to Winston: "He felt neither of [the drafts] balanced the science and adventure elements effectively ... too much science will make the movie too talky, but too much adventure will make it seem hollow". Progress stalled during 2005, as Marshall and Spielberg were busy with other film projects. In January 2006, Johnston and Horner were working on a new story. A month later, Marshall said the project had a script and would begin filming in 2007 for release the following year. He later said that only a story idea existed and that a new script had not yet been written. Work on the project was expected to begin following the completion of a fourth Indiana Jones film by Spielberg and Marshall.

Spielberg said in July 2006 that Johnston would direct Jurassic Park IV. At the end of the year, Laura Dern said she was open to reprising her role as Ellie Sattler but had not been contacted about appearing in the film. A few months later, Neill said he knew nothing about the project. By April 2007, Dern had been asked to reprise her role, with filming expected to begin that year for release in 2008. By that time, Johnston no longer planned to direct the film. A Writers Guild of America strike began in November 2007, and Marshall said that further work on the script would begin once the strike reached a resolution, with filming potentially starting in 2008 for a release in mid-2009. Horner's 2009 book, How to Build a Dinosaur, was originally planned for release alongside the film as a scientific companion volume.

During 2008, Attenborough and Goldblum expressed interest in reprising their roles, although Attenborough suffered a fall at his home later that year and subsequently retired from acting. In addition, Crichton died at the end of 2008, and Kennedy said: "I sorta felt maybe that's it. Maybe that's a sign that we don't mess with it". Marshall said six months later that the film had no story and was a long shot.

In a 2008 interview, published a year later, Johnston discussed the possibility of Jurassic Park IV, saying that its story was completely different from its predecessors and would not be set on an island. Johnston also said the film would take the series into a second Jurassic Park trilogy. In early 2010, he reiterated that the film would mark the beginning of a new trilogy. Johnston said the film would feature new characters and a new story, with no dinosaur theme park and no relation to the Monahan/Sayles script. Johnston hoped to further develop Jurassic Park IV with Spielberg after they finished other projects, including Johnston's 2011 film Captain America: The First Avenger.

To accompany the relaunch of the Jurassic Park franchise, Spielberg wanted to release a sequel to the 1998 game Trespasser. He contacted Seamus Blackley, who oversaw the original game, to work on the sequel. Blackley's proposed game was titled Jurassic World. It would involve dinosaurs escaping from InGen's islands and reaching civilization. A pitch trailer was created in 2011, depicting loose pterosaurs attacking a surfer. Although Spielberg liked the idea, the game was canceled following a management change at Universal, and Blackley sent the art assets to Marshall.

By June 2011, Spielberg had met twice with writer Mark Protosevich to work on a story for a potential fourth Jurassic Park film. In July, Johnston said he was in discussions about the film, which was still planned as the start of a new trilogy. Later that month, Spielberg confirmed that a writer was working on a treatment for the film, which he said might be released within two or three years. Universal hoped to have the film out in 2013. Spielberg initially said that the film's planned story was stronger than that of Jurassic Park III. Protosevich wrote two treatments for the film, but neither were accepted. Spielberg and Kennedy determined that the project did not have an adequate story, and ideas were still being discussed toward the end of 2011. Writers Rick Jaffa and Amanda Silver were hired in June 2012 to script Jurassic Park IV. Spielberg had been impressed by their 2011 film Rise of the Planet of the Apes.

== Pre-production ==
Universal announced in January 2013 that the film would be released on June 13, 2014. A month after the announcement, it was confirmed that Kennedy would no longer produce the film, instead focusing on the Star Wars sequel trilogy. Marshall remained as a producer, with Louisiana as a possible filming location.

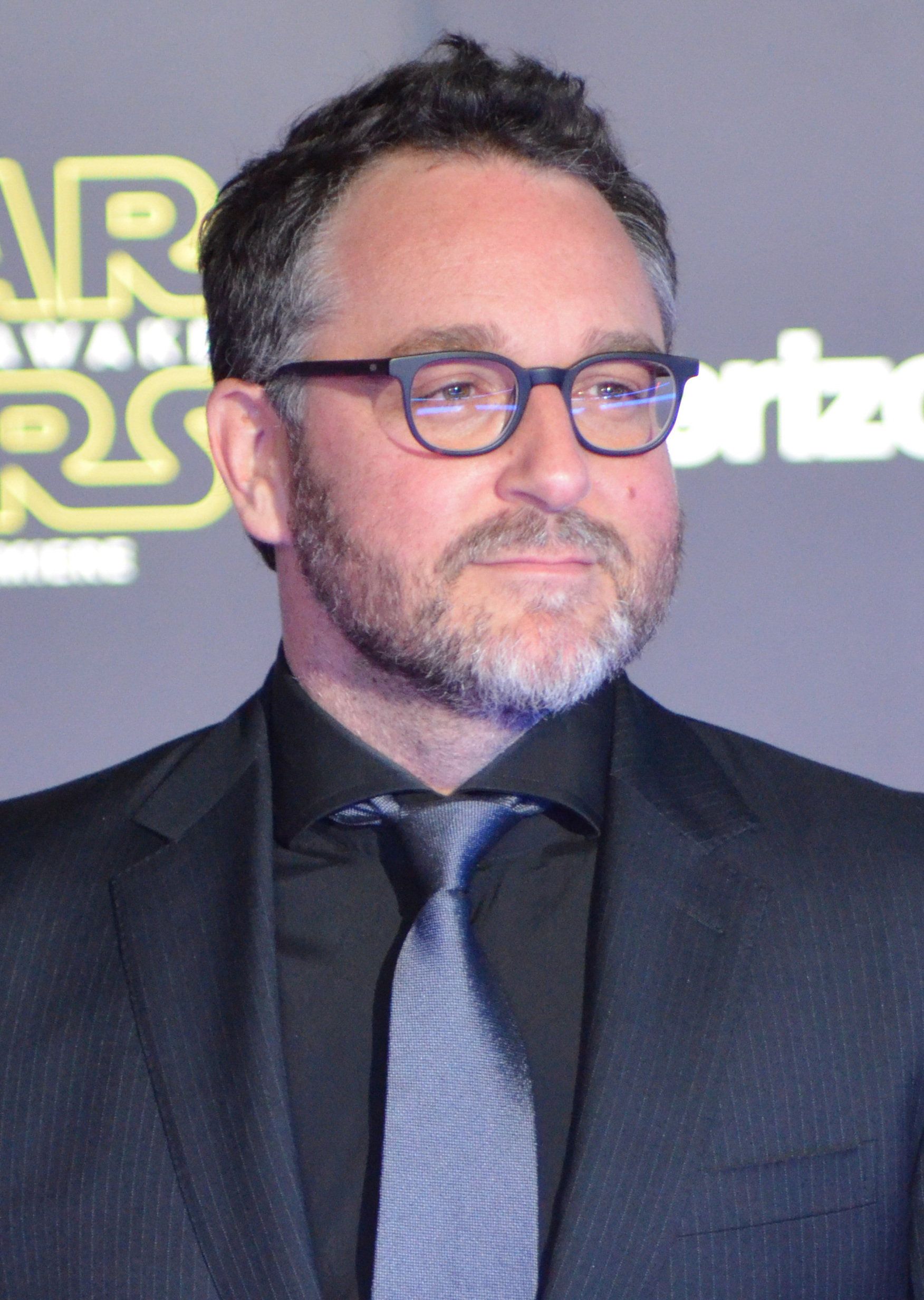
Colin Trevorrow directed the film.

Brad Bird wanted to direct Star Wars: The Force Awakens, and he suggested to Kennedy that she temporarily employ Colin Trevorrow as a stand-in for him during the film's pre-production. Under this proposal, Bird would take over the Star Wars project upon completion of his film Tomorrowland. Bird's idea prompted Kennedy and her husband, Marshall, to watch Trevorrow's 2012 film Safety Not Guaranteed, which they found impressive. Marshall subsequently had Spielberg watch the film, convincing him that Trevorrow could be an adequate choice to direct Jurassic Park IV. At the end of February 2013, Marshall arranged a meeting between himself, Trevorrow and Spielberg. Marshall said he and Spielberg realized that Trevorrow "was deeply steeped in Jurassic Park and would bring that sense of childlike wonder to the film". Trevorrow was subsequently hired without reading Jaffa and Silver's script, which was still being written.

Universal announced Trevorrow as director in March 2013, and Patrick Crowley as a producer alongside Marshall. A year had been spent searching for a director. Spielberg, Marshall, and Kennedy had previously considered Juan Antonio Bayona (who would direct Jurassic World's sequel, Jurassic World: Fallen Kingdom), but he declined because he felt there was not enough time for production. Trevorrow's only prior experience in directing a major film project was the low-budget Safety Not Guaranteed. Despite Trevorrow's lack of experience on such a large film project, Crowley said "from the beginning he exhibited real characteristics of leadership and had that inherent decisiveness required. His comments and observations were wise, certainly far beyond his experience and years, and it was clear early on that he had what it takes".

After reading Jaffa and Silver's draft, Trevorrow insisted on completely rewriting the script with writing partner Derek Connolly, who had never seen any of the Jurassic Park films prior to that point. Trevorrow had told the filmmakers, "if I direct this screenplay, it's going to be a bad movie. I'm gonna do a bad job, because I just don't get it". Trevorrow and Connolly wrote their own draft of the script over a couple of weeks. Universal received the draft on May 6, 2013, and found the changes more large-scale than anticipated. Two days later, the studio delayed the film to an unspecified date. Filming had been set to begin seven weeks later. The delay allowed Trevorrow and Connolly more time to work on the script, as Spielberg felt that it needed improvement. Another reason for the delay was to allow time for the construction of practical sets for the film's fictional theme park; it was previously intended to add in these buildings using computer effects.

Location scouting was underway in May 2013, with Trevorrow suggesting that the film would return to the Hawaiian island of Kauai, which stood in for Isla Nublar in the original film. Neill said it was unlikely he would be a part of the film: "I'm told it's a big reboot, a total re-jig". Trevorrow eventually stated that "reboot is a strong word. This is a new sci-fi terror adventure set 22 years after the horrific events of Jurassic Park". In June 2013, a new release date of 2015 was announced, and it was reported that the film would revolve around a fully functional dinosaur theme park. In August, Legendary Pictures was considering co-financing the film with Universal.

In September 2013, Universal announced the film's new title, Jurassic World, and set its release for June 12, 2015. Trevorrow chose to rename the film from its previous title, Jurassic Park IV, to differentiate it from the earlier films in the series. He also said that within the story, "if you named a theme park 'Jurassic Park' after the disaster that had happened it would be a horrible PR mistake". New Orleans was announced as a filming location in February 2014. By that time, Legendary Pictures had agreed to co-finance the film, and provided about 20% of the budget. China Film Group has been reported as also having financed the film. Thomas Tull of Legendary Pictures served as executive producer with Spielberg.

=== Writing ===
Spielberg had three ideas he wanted Jaffa and Silver to incorporate into the script; a fully functioning dinosaur theme park, a human who has a relationship with trained raptors (from Sayles's earlier draft), and a human-eating dinosaur that escapes and has to be stopped. Spielberg also wanted the story to involve children. Jaffa and Silver's draft, titled Jurassic Park IV, included an early scene set in China, where the fossilized remains of a new dinosaur species are discovered by a Chinese paleontologist. In the draft, the remains are stolen by a corporation with malicious intentions, leading the paleontologist and her two sons to visit Jurassic Park. Jaffa and Silver worked on the script for approximately a year, with input from Spielberg. The script also included an opening scene with the dinosaur handler and his raptor pack jumping out of a helicopter to perform a military raid of a drug dealer's compound, an idea that was present in Sayles' earlier draft.

==== Trevorrow and Connolly ====
After the film was delayed in May 2013, Trevorrow and Connolly continued rewriting the script and worked with Spielberg to perfect it. Throughout the writing period, Trevorrow, Connolly and Spielberg met to discuss the film's story. David Koepp also met with Trevorrow and Connolly to advise them on the script. Koepp wrote the first two films, but declined an offer to write the fourth because he felt he had nothing left to contribute to the series. Trevorrow said perfecting the script was the hardest part because Jurassic Park films "don't fit into a specific genre. They're sci-fi adventures that also have to be funny, emotional and scary as hell. That takes a lot of construction, but it can't feel designed".

To write the story, Trevorrow and Connolly discussed major news events that occurred in the past twenty years. Trevorrow said two main ideas emerged; the ill-advised pursuit of money leading to environmental disaster and the ubiquity of technology leading to ignorance and the taking for granted of scientific wonders. According to Trevorrow, "[w]e take so much for granted … we imagined a teenager texting his girlfriend with his back to a T-Rex behind protective glass. For us, that image captured the way much of the audience feels about the movies themselves. 'We've seen CG dinosaurs. What else you got?' " The film features a large amount of product placement, including Samsung and Mercedes-Benz. Trevorrow said this was inspired by a quotation from Ian Malcolm in the first film: "You stood on the shoulders of geniuses to accomplish something as fast as you could, and before you even knew what you had, you patented it, and packaged it, and slapped it on a plastic lunchbox, and now you wanna sell it". Trevorrow also viewed Jurassic World as a story about film sequels, explaining: "Why would you make another sequel to one of these movies? It's a horrible mistake. Well, because there's a lot of money on the table. Why would you rebuild a park? We re-make our mistakes because somebody somewhere is going to make a lot of money". Trevorrow believed that Crichton would have appreciated the film's thematic perspective on corporations.

Trevorrow and Connolly retained Spielberg's three ideas, although Trevorrow felt the concept of trained raptors was, in its original form, too extreme and had to be "pulled way, way, way back". Trevorrow read most of the earlier drafts for the project, starting a few months after he was hired. He said each draft "tried to do something different" from the earlier films in the series. Trevorrow called Sayles's initial draft "fascinating in a lot of ways. There were a lot of things I loved about it. It was properly bonkers. In a way, I aspired for our film, in its fearlessness and willingness, to go there". Trevorrow further stated that he was "interested in what the Sayles script was trying to do because it was so daring. It was trying to set a tone for how far forward we needed to push". However, he felt that the previous scripts "took us too far forward with man's progressions with dinosaurs". Owen's relationship with raptors was inspired by real-life relationships between humans and dangerous animals such as lions and alligators. In their first appearance in the film, the raptors are ordered not to eat a live pig in their enclosure; Trevorrow said that this "was as far as we should be able to go" with the concept of trained raptors.

Trevorrow and Connolly did not want to include previous characters in the new film without a good reason for their return; they considered Dr. Henry Wu, the scientist responsible for recreating dinosaurs, a logical choice. In the first novel, Wu had a much larger role, which was trimmed down for the film adaptation. Trevorrow said that the characters Alan Grant, Ian Malcolm, and Ellie Sattler were not included in the script because "I respect those actors too much to shoehorn them into this story for my own sentimental reasons. Jurassic Park isn't about the bad luck of three people who keep getting thrown into the same situation. The only reason they'd go back to that island is if the screenwriters contrived a reason for them to go". Trevorrow said viewers could feel nostalgia without having an actor reprise a role after so many years, which he believed "might make you feel old and remind you that you're on a slow march towards death, like the rest of us!" An image of Malcolm does briefly appear twice in the film, shown on a fictional book written by the character. The park's visitor center also features a statue of Hammond, who died prior to the film's events.

According to Trevorrow, the film "isn't a sequel or a reboot or a remake, it's all of those things in a strange way". He did not wish to make a "carbon copy of Jurassic Park". Jurassic World features various references to Jurassic Park, and is considered a direct sequel to the first film; Trevorrow stated that the events of the previous two films were not relevant to the new film's story because they take place on a different island, Isla Sorna. He also said the events depicted in the film's predecessors are still canon.

==== Rewrite ====
Trevorrow's and Connolly's rewrite of the Jaffa/Silver script introduced various changes, including new characters. Trevorrow wrote the characters Hoskins, Masrani, and Wu while Connolly wrote the children and female characters. In Jaffa and Silver's draft, the main character, who would become Owen, actively supported the militarization of the raptors from the beginning of the story. Trevorrow said "if anyone's gonna militarize raptors that's what the bad guy does, he's insane". Characters in the Jaffa/Silver draft included Vance and Whitney, who would later become Owen Grady and Claire Dearing in the Trevorrow/Connolly revision. Whitney would serve as an obstacle to Vance's plans, and would have a smaller role than that of Claire. Trevorrow felt that Whitney was the one character in the earlier script who "had the most room to grow". He chose the name "Claire", describing it as "hard on the surface but ultimately warm and loving", while Connolly chose the surname "Dearing". According to Trevorrow, Connolly "loves those Dickensian names that suggest a bit about the character, push the viewer in the direction the author wants them to go. She may seem sharp-edged at first, but ultimately she's very endearing". Trevorrow's and Connolly's script redraft also changed the story so viewers would first see the theme park from the perspective of a child. Trevorrow said one of his goals was for the child characters of Zach and Gray to "not be annoying. And I think we pulled it off". Gray was initially written as a child with autism, a trait that was removed from the final draft.

Initially, the film's new dinosaur was known as Malusaurus. In Jaffa's and Silver's draft, the new dinosaur - a non-existent species - was depicted as a real animal. Trevorrow made the dinosaur a genetically modified hybrid named Indominus rex to maintain consistency with earlier films in the series, which had incorporated the latest paleontological discoveries; he said, "I didn't wanna make up a new dinosaur and tell kids it was real". Trevorrow said that the behavior of the Indominus rex was somewhat inspired by the 2013 film Blackfish, saying the dinosaur "is kind of out killing for sport because it grew up in captivity. It's sort of, like, if the black fish orca got loose and never knew its mother and has been fed from a crane". Trevorrow said the idea of a hybrid dinosaur was "not tremendously different from [those in] the first film, by adding frog DNA. It's the next level". In addition to the Indominus rex, the earlier draft by Trevorrow and Connolly also included a second hybrid dinosaur named Stegoceratops, which is bred using DNA from Stegosaurus and Triceratops. Trevorrow removed the animal from the final script after his son persuaded him that featuring multiple hybrids would not make the Indominus unique. Hybrid dinosaurs were previously introduced to the franchise through Jurassic Park: Chaos Effect, an unsuccessful toy line released by Kenner in 1998.

Trevorrow and Connolly shortened the raptor hunt for the park's new, escaped dinosaur, which in the Jaffa/Silver draft occupied the second half of the film. One scene, which was inspired by Crichton's novel The Lost World, involves Owen riding a motorcycle while his raptors race alongside him during their search for the Indominus. Spielberg had intended to include the scene as early as 2005, although his initial vision involved humans on motorcycles fleeing from raptors rather than cooperating with them. The Indominus's camouflage ability is also present in The Lost World, which features Carnotaurus with the same ability.

Trevorrow suggested the idea of including a Mosasaurus as part of a theme-park feeding show in which park-goers would watch from bleachers as the animal leaps out of a lagoon and catches its prey: a shark hanging above the water. Spielberg suggested lowering the bleachers afterwards to give park guests a view of the creature in its aquatic habitat. The theme park's ball-shaped gyrosphere rides were another of Spielberg's ideas; he approved Trevorrow's and Connolly's draft in September 2013.

=== Casting ===
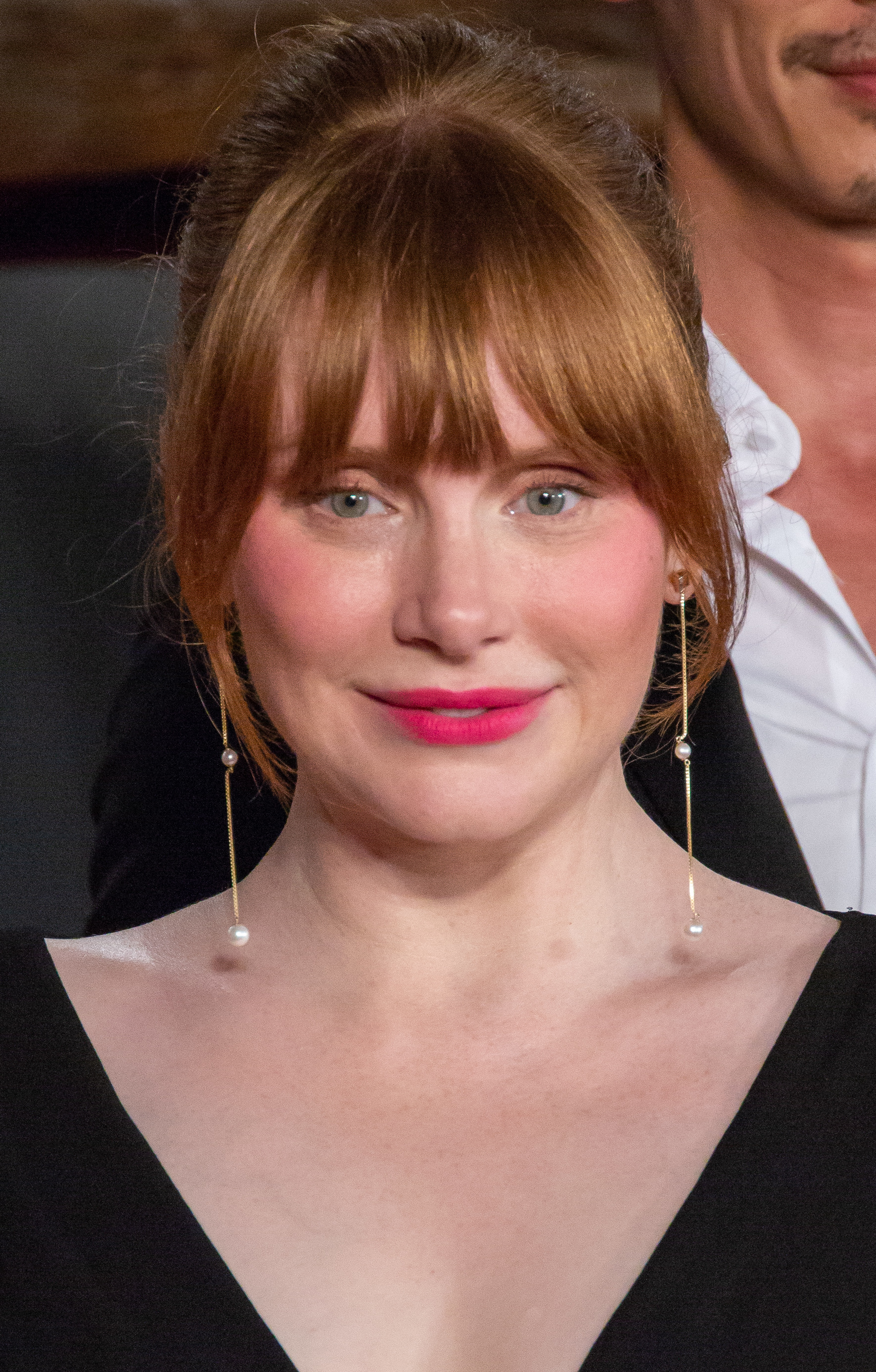
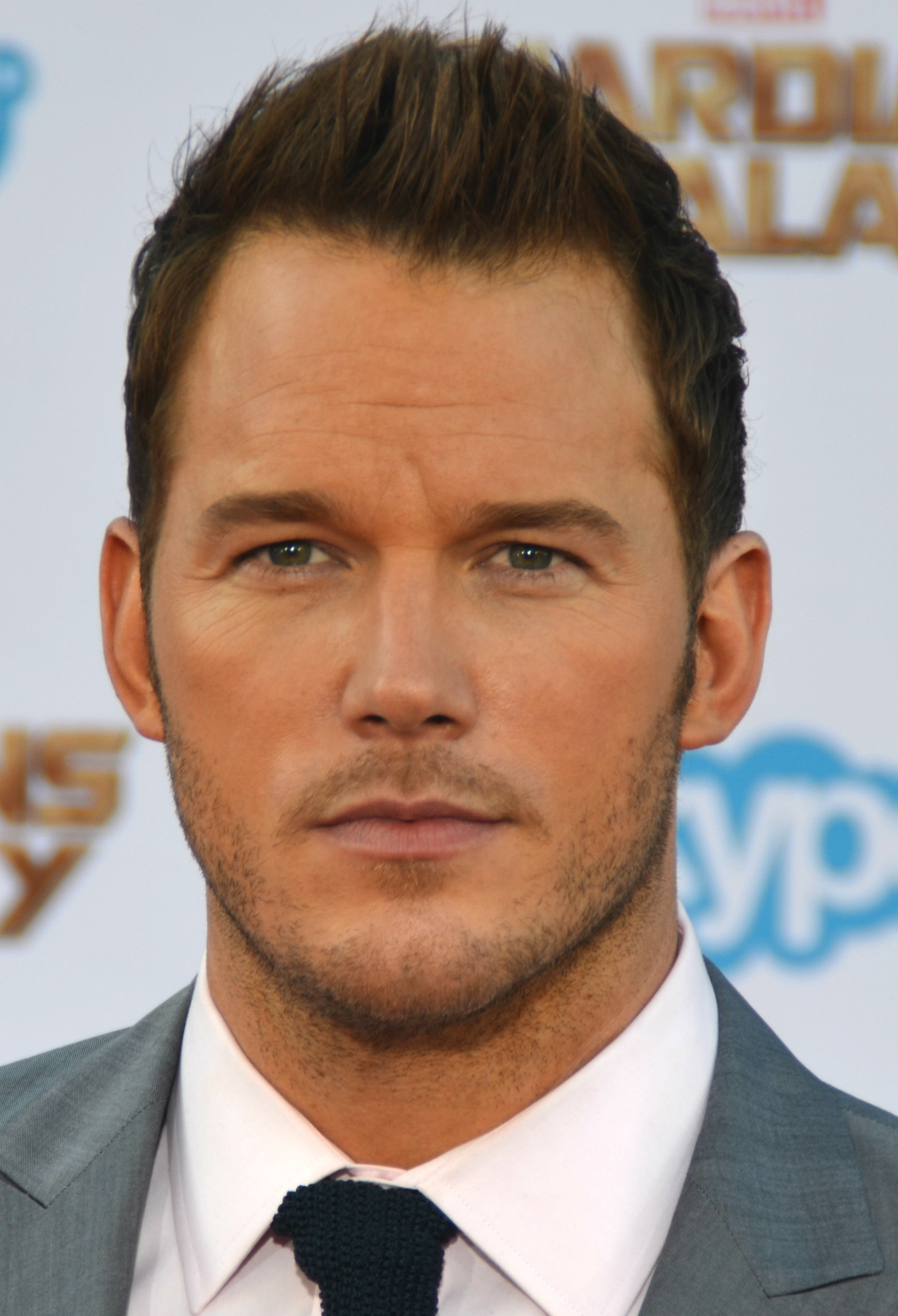
Bryce Dallas Howard and Chris Pratt were cast in the lead roles

Prior to the production delay in May 2013, actors Bryce Dallas Howard, David Oyelowo and Garrett Hedlund had been considered for roles in the film. Four months later, Howard was in early negotiations for a role, and was cast by November 2013. Within a couple weeks, Chris Pratt was in negotiations to play Owen. His casting was confirmed in January 2014, before the release of Guardians of the Galaxy, which featured a breakout role for him as Star-Lord. Trevorrow was impressed by Pratt's brief role in Zero Dark Thirty, and later said "we had no idea he'd become as big a star as he has. I just cast a bunch of character actors, as all Jurassic Park movies have. And somehow we ended up with a movie star". Other actors considered for the role included Josh Brolin, and John Krasinski. Trevorrow and Pratt described Owen as a combination of Grant and Malcolm. Although Pratt received top billing in the cast, Trevorrow stated that Howard's character Claire is the lead role.

Other prominent characters included Zach and Gray, portrayed by Nick Robinson and Ty Simpkins. Trevorrow wanted to cast Robinson after seeing his performance in The Kings of Summer. Robinson and Simpkins had to perform a "scream test" as part of their audition. Both were cast in October 2013. Other roles were cast in early 2014, with Vincent D'Onofrio, Irrfan Khan and Omar Sy among those joining the project. Trevorrow had admired Sy's acting and wrote the character of Barry with him in mind for the role. Trevorrow also said he cast actors such as Sy because they were well-known internationally, stating that "this is a global film and Jurassic Park doesn't belong to just America". Jake Johnson, who previously starred in Trevorrow's Safety Not Guaranteed, was also cast in Jurassic World. Scarlett Johansson, a big fan of the franchise who was eventually cast as Zora Bennett in Jurassic World Rebirth, heard about the film's development and reached out to comment about her availability, but nothing worked out.

BD Wong's return as Wu was announced in March 2014, with Trevorrow saying that the character would have a more significant role than he did in the original film. Wong is the only returning actor from any of the previous films. A week before filming began, Judy Greer, Katie McGrath and Lauren Lapkus were announced as cast members, followed a month later by Andy Buckley; he and Greer portray the parents of Zach and Gray.

== Filming ==
Principal photography began on April 10, 2014, at Hawaii's Honolulu Zoo. The film was made under the working title Ebb Tide, which Spielberg chose before Trevorrow was hired. Spielberg did not visit the set, although he watched daily film footage at the end of each production day and sometimes advised Trevorrow on the filming of certain scenes.

In contrast to the prevalence of digital cinematography in the 2010s, cinematographer John Schwartzman used Panavision cameras with a combination of Kodak 35mm and 65mm film stocks. One of the 65mm cameras was previously used in the filming of Stanley Kubrick's 2001: A Space Odyssey. The reason the filmmakers chose to shoot Jurassic World on film stock, in addition to both Spielberg and Schwartzman's personal preference for the format, was to match the visual aesthetic of the previous three film-shot Jurassic Park pictures, and because the film's exterior jungle scenes required a greater dynamic range of light than digital cameras could accommodate. Most of Jurassic World was made on 35mm film and large exteriors in Hawaii were shot using 65mm film, which was used for visual effect sequences and as location shots where the filmmakers wanted extra visual impact.

The film is presented in a Univisium 2.00:1 aspect ratio, an intermediate ratio that falls between the two industry standard aspect ratios of 1.85:1 (flat) and 2.39:1 (scope). This was chosen because it allowed enough height for humans and dinosaurs to fit into the same frame without giving up a sense of scope, and closely matches the ratio of digital IMAX screens. Schwartzman made extensive use of the Technocrane telescopic crane, which Crowley described as fitting for a thriller, "being able to march into people, to get in closer and closer, as they realize that there's something out there". Tracking shots, particularly those that would serve as reference to the visual effects team, used a Spydercam.

Less than two months into filming, Trevorrow confirmed reports that the story involved a functioning dinosaur theme park and a hybrid dinosaur; he was disappointed these details could not be kept secret until the film's release. The Indominus rex was also known as Diabolus rex, a name Trevorrow devised to maintain secrecy on the project ahead of its release.

Scroggins Aviation was hired to fabricate and build the blue Eurocopter EC130 T2 airframe body known as "JW001" in the film, while 32TEN Studios created the park's automatic Jurassic World gates and various practical effects such as explosions. Automaker Mercedes-Benz provided several models for use as the park's staff vehicles.

=== Hawaii ===
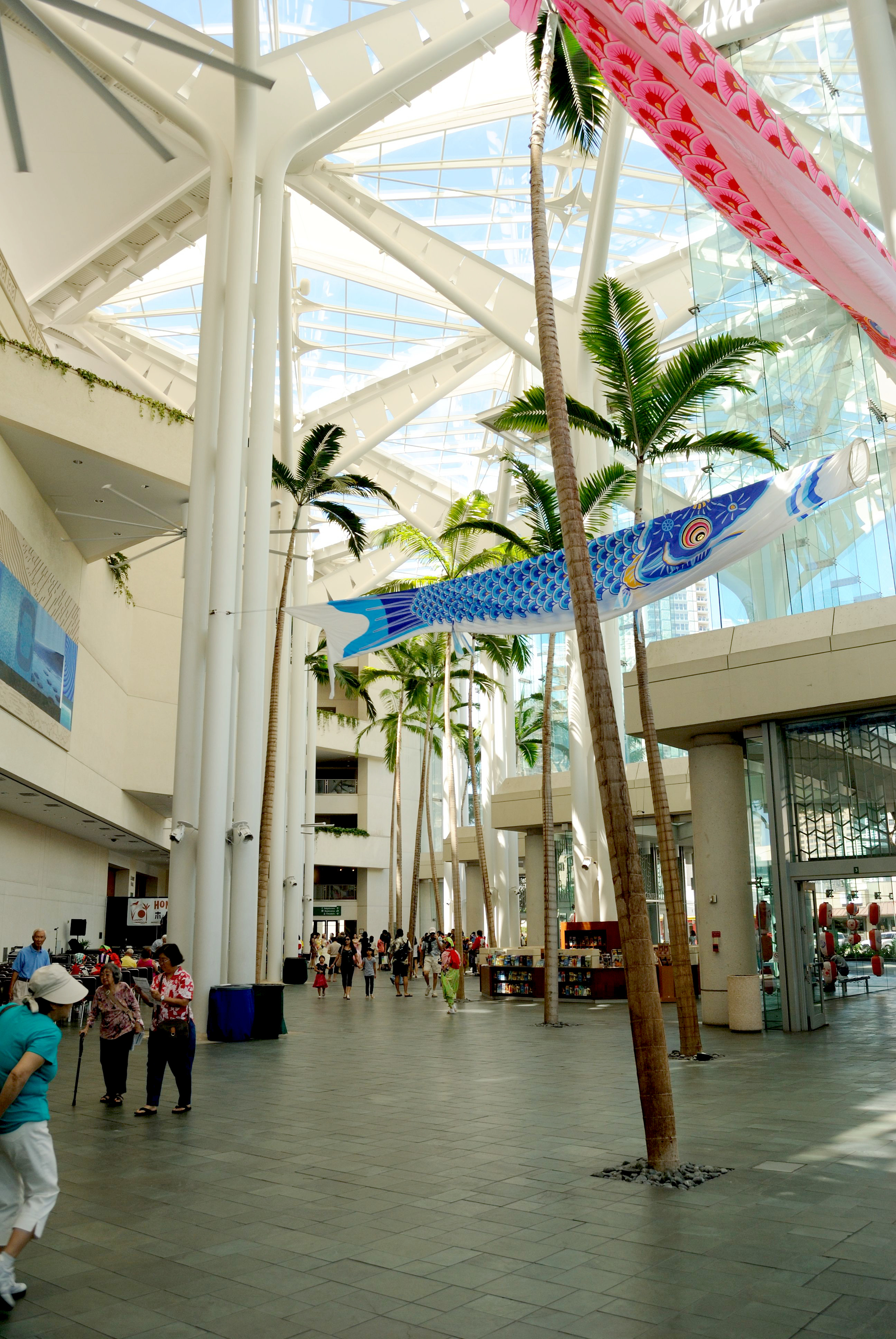
The Hawaii Convention Center was among filming locations.

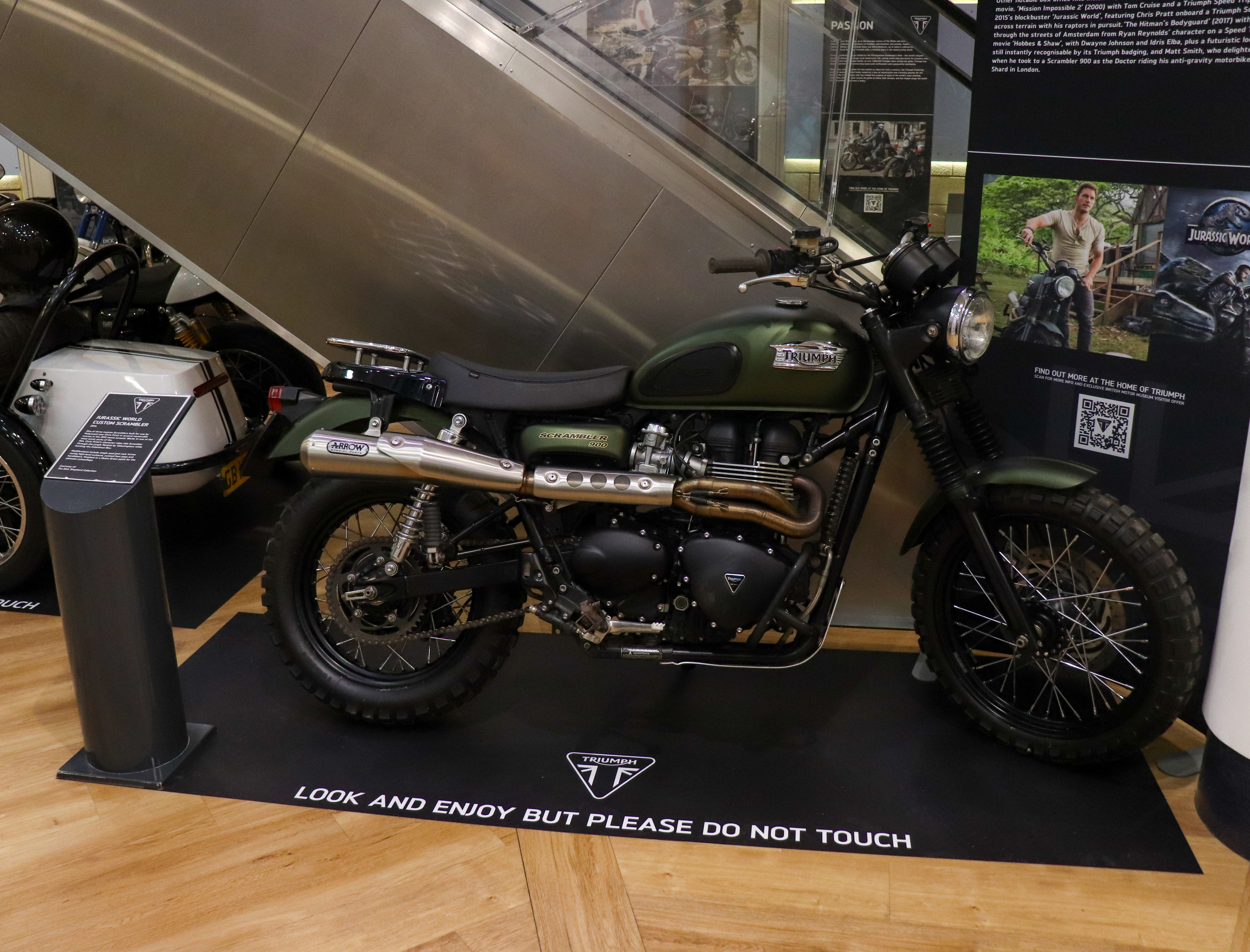
Owen's Triumph Scrambler, on display at the British Motor Museum

Filming lasted four weeks on the Hawaiian island of Oʻahu. An elephant paddock at the Honolulu Zoo was used to portray Jurassic World's petting zoo. Howard's son portrayed one of the children seen in the zoo. Filming in Hawaii was limited to three hours on some days because of torrential rain. The 40-foot (12 m)-high Indominus paddock and the Gyrosphere departure platform were built at Oʻahu's Kualoa Ranch; both sets were left standing after production to become tourist attractions.

Owen's motorcycle sequence with the raptors was filmed along a dirt road at Kualoa Ranch; computer-generated jungle foliage was added during post-production. A Triumph Scrambler was used as Owen's motorcycle, and three were made for the film production. Pratt crashed while filming the sequence, resulting in minor injuries. Other scenes shot at Kualoa Ranch included a mountainside helipad and the exterior of Owen's camper trailer.

At the end of April 2014, interior footage was filmed at the Hawaii Convention Center, used as the park's hotel lobby. The film's ending, in which park guests are evacuated to an airplane hangar set up as a shelter, was filmed at the Pacific Aviation Museum Pearl Harbor on Ford Island. A Honolulu ferry, the Navatek I, was used to portray a Jurassic World ferry for park guests. Filming moved to Kauaʻi on May 15, and concluded there on June 6. The Hawaii shoot lasted a total of 33 days.

=== Louisiana ===
Jurassic World was also shot in Louisiana to take advantage of the state's tax incentives, making it the first film in the series not to be shot at studios in Los Angeles. Filming was scheduled to remain in Louisiana for eleven weeks beginning in June 2014 at the abandoned Six Flags New Orleans theme park, and continuing there for approximately two weeks. Jurassic World's Main Street and boardwalk, measuring 300 ft × 200 ft (91 m × 61 m), was constructed in the Six Flags parking lot, but the theme park itself was not used for filming, as it was too badly damaged from Hurricane Katrina. While filming was underway in Hawaii, a crew of approximately 400 people worked to construct the boardwalk set. Approximately 800 extras were used to populate the Main Street set during filming. One of Main Street's restaurants is named Winston's after Stan Winston, who died in 2008.

Singer Jimmy Buffett, a friend of Marshall, has a brief, non-speaking cameo appearance during the film's pterosaur attack sequence. A Margaritaville restaurant, part of a chain owned by Buffett, was also constructed as part of Jurassic World's Main Street; it is destroyed during a battle between the T. rex and the Indominus. Trevorrow based the pterosaur attack sequence on triptych paintings by Hieronymus Bosch that include details for their admirers to observe. Trevorrow said about the scene: "I wanted to be able to step back and look at these tableaus of chaotic action and allow people who watch the movie over and over again ... to always see a different story as you look specifically at different parts of the frame".

The pterosaur sequence includes a scene in which Claire's assistant Zara (McGrath) is carried off by several Pteranodon before falling into the park's lagoon, where she is eaten by the Mosasaurus, marking the first female death in the series. Trevorrow wanted to make it "the most spectacular death we can possibly imagine", while also wanting to surprise moviegoers, stating: "Let's have someone die who just doesn't deserve to die at all". McGrath performed her own stunts for the scene, which involved the fall and submersion into the park's lagoon.

A major filming location was Big Easy Studios, located at NASA's Michoud Assembly Facility complex in East New Orleans. Interior scenes, including the Jurassic World visitor center, control room and laboratories, were filmed at the Michoud facility, where six stages were occupied for the production. Horner helped designed the educational displays in the Jurassic World visitor center. Approximately 200 extras, acting as park guests sitting on bleachers, were doused with water as part of a scene depicting the Mosasaurus feeding show, which was filmed on an outdoor set at the Michoud facility. The raptor enclosure, an octagonal, 20 ft (6.1 m)-high outdoor structure, was also constructed at the Michoud facility, as was a set for the original Jurassic Park visitor center. An overturned Ford Explorer tour vehicle from the first film was initially considered for inclusion in Jurassic World, before Trevorrow settled on featuring the original park's visitor center.

One jungle scene was filmed on a soundstage in Louisiana, while the rest were filmed earlier in Hawaii. On June 30, 2014, Robinson, Simpkins and Greer filmed scenes at Louis Armstrong International Airport in New Orleans. In July, fake snow was used in New Orleans for scenes that depict Zach and Gray's house in Wisconsin. An evacuation scene was filmed at Audubon Zoo in New Orleans. Approximately 15 cameras were set up in trees at the zoo to film extras running around in a panic. These scenes were used as security footage for the park's control room. Swamp scenes were filmed in Slidell, Louisiana.

The Jurassic World theme park was based on resorts around the world, and production designer Ed Verreaux said "we wanted to create an environment modern travelers would really want to visit". Trevorrow wanted the park to resemble "a place that could exist now, not a sci-fi imagining set in the future". To aid in the design of the Jurassic World control room, Trevorrow and Crowley visited such rooms at various Universal and Disney theme parks prior to filming. They were disappointed by the unexciting appearances of these facilities and made the Jurassic World control room more elaborate than its real-life counterparts. The control room set included many television monitors displaying miscellaneous information; some of the footage for the monitors was filmed in Hawaii and at the NASA facility, and some was also obtained from Universal Orlando. Production designers based parts of the control room on the one located at NASA's facility.

Filming wrapped on August 5, 2014, after 78 shooting days.

=== Deleted scenes ===
Trevorrow filmed two versions of many scenes so he could choose which to use for the final film. One deleted scene featured a kiss between the control-room characters of Vivian (Lapkus) and Lowery (Johnson). It was removed because the film already had such a scene between Owen and Claire. A comedic scene featuring Claire and dinosaur feces, similar to a scene involving Ellie Sattler in the original film, was also removed. A line of dialogue was cut during a conversation in which Wu asks Masrani "How long do you think you can control it? We won't always be the only ones who can make a dinosaur".

Another deleted scene occurs during the fight between the T. rex and the Indominus, which initially would have been watched by park guests. Trevorrow chose not to include the scene because it could not be seamlessly included without disrupting the fight scene, most of which filmed in a single take. An unfilmed scene would have shown the Indominus rex being startled by an animatronic T. rex at the park and subsequently tearing its head off. Spielberg objected to the scene because he believed it would be disrespectful to Winston for suggesting computer-animated dinosaurs are better than animatronics.

== Creatures on screen ==
Jurassic World is the first film in the series without the involvement of Stan Winston, who died in 2008. The animatronic dinosaurs were handled by Winston's former colleagues at Legacy Effects, many of whom worked on the previous three films. Legacy Effects contributed lighting reference models and a practically built animatronic. Visual effects supervisor Phil Tippett and Industrial Light & Magic (ILM) also returned to create dinosaurs using computer-generated imagery (CGI). Image Engine also worked on the film's creatures and provided 280 visual effects shots. Tim Alexander served as visual effects supervisor and Jurassic Park supervisor Dennis Muren provided advice to the ILM crew on matters such as lighting the dinosaurs. ILM's studios in San Francisco, Singapore and Vancouver worked on the film. In total, Jurassic World contains 988 visual effects shots.

Some of the computer-generated creatures, including those seen in the park's petting zoo, were created with motion capture using human actors to perform the animals' movements, marking the first time that motion capture technology had been used in the making of a dinosaur film. Trevorrow said: "We got to build everyone from the ground up because technology has changed so much that everything is a rebuild". New technology such as subsurface scattering allowed the creatures' skin and muscle tissue to be given additional detail that could not be achieved in the earlier films. As with the previous films, actors had to imagine many of the creatures, which were digitally added during post-production. Actors were aided by cardboard cut-outs and tennis balls on sticks, all of which represented the creatures that would later be added into the film. ILM's V-scout application, which used an iPad to digitally depict dinosaur models in the filming environment, further helped the actors. ILM had also used the V-scout during location scouting. For more than a year and a half, sound designer Al Nelson and his team traveled to zoos and bird sanctuaries in several states to record various bird sounds, which would be used as vocal effects for the dinosaurs.

Part of the fight scene between the T. rex and the Indominus rex was inspired by a video clip that Spielberg shot of his dogs growling and lunging at each other. Early in pre-production, Tippett helped Trevorrow plan and choreograph the battle sequence by having a scale model created for the scene. Previsualizations of the scene were then created to assist in filming it. Tippett also visited the set during production and later discussed the creature animations with ILM. Trevorrow included several creatures he felt had always deserved a big scene: "I didn't want to just throw the kitchen sink at it. Each of these movies has done a good job at just very carefully, in a measured way, increasing the new dinosaurs that you see". Several creatures make notable appearances in the film:

- Indominus rex: In addition to the DNA of T. rex, Velociraptor and cuttlefish, the film's promotional website states that the creature also has the DNA of Carnotaurus, Giganotosaurus, Majungasaurus, and Rugops. Trevorrow said the animal's mixed DNA allowed it to have attributes "that no dinosaur was known to have". The dinosaur's long forelimbs were based on those of Therizinosaurus. ILM conducted many animation tests to examine the creature's unique characteristics, which include its long arms, raptor claws and small thumbs; its ability to walk on four legs and push itself up from the ground with its claws; and its ability to throw objects with its claws. Glen McIntosh, the animation supervisor for ILM, said: "We did a bunch of animation tests to explore that. We found that if you overanimated or made it too anthropomorphic and human-like in its movement, it feels it. The goal was to always make sure she felt like a gigantic animal that was a theropod but taking advantage of its extra features". Several fifth scale maquettes of the Indominus rex were created for lighting reference. Some motion capture tests were done with a human portraying the Indominus rex, although Trevorrow felt that the method did not work well for the animal. The animal sounds used to create the Indominus roars included those from big pigs, whales, beluga whales, dolphins, fennec fox, lions, monkeys, and walruses.
- For the film's Velociraptor, Tippett provided animatics and previsualization scenes during pre-production. The creatures were primarily created using motion capture. Image Engine finished the creatures using the motion capture information and a near-final raptor model by ILM. Life-size maquettes of the raptors were also used during scenes in which the creatures are caged. For the sequence in which the raptors run through the jungle hunting for the Indominus, Trevorrow was inspired by a quotation from character Robert Muldoon in the first film, in which he stated that the animals were capable of running at the same speed as a cheetah. McIntosh said: "We had seen how smart and cunning the raptors could be as hunters but we hadn't seen them as these unbelievably agile and ferociously fast animals in their native jungle environment". Legacy Effects provided one of the full-sized raptor models built for Jurassic Park to the ILM crew to use as a reference. The raptor model weighed approximately 500 lb (230 kg) and measured approximately six feet (1.8 m) tall and twelve to fourteen feet (3.7 to 4.3 m) long, which helped the animators determine the raptors' locomotion for the hunting scene. The animators determined that an animal of such size probably weighed about 500 lb (230 kg)—as much as a fully grown Bengal tiger. They referenced an ostrich and a tiger to determine on the raptors' movements. Ostrich was chosen because it is the largest existing bird and the fastest two-legged animal alive; McIntosh said the "length of the steps and the cadence of the steps informed the animators". McIntosh said tigers were also referenced because of their intense focus while running "where the body moves around the head but the head stays fixed and focused on its prey. The tiger also gave us the power of a predator that size charging and weaving through the jungle while on the hunt". For the hunting scene, the raptors' heads were extended forward, giving them a straight, tiger-like, head-to-tail silhouette. Some initial animation tests were created for the hunting sequence about four months before filming. The raptor vocals were created using audio recordings of penguins and toucans. For the sound of the raptors running, a sound team member had microphones attached to his feet that recorded him running across wood chips.
- Several individuals of Apatosaurus appear, including a practically built animatronic used for a sequence filmed in Kauaʻi. Because of the cost, Crowley was initially hesitant to have an animatronic created for the film but Trevorrow persuaded him fans of the series would enjoy it. The animatronic consisted of a seven-foot (2.1 m)-long section of the dinosaur's neck, which was used for a close-up shot depicting the animal's death. The audio recordings of a Harris's hawk provided the moans of the wounded Apatosaurus. ILM used elephants as an example of the animation of the Apatosaurus. McIntosh stated that "there are no existing animals that have such large necks, but in terms of the size and steps they're taking, elephants are an excellent example of that. Also the way their skin jiggles and sags. You also have impact tremors that rise up through their legs as they take steps". Legacy Effects initially created a small model of the creature for use in the film; Spielberg decided a larger model would be better. The original model was scanned into a computer, allowing artists to create a 3-D model in the size needed for the film.
- The film's Tyrannosaurus rex is intended to be the same individual that appeared in the first film. Trevorrow said "we took the original design and obviously, technology has changed. So, it's going to move a little bit differently, but it'll move differently because it's older. And we're giving her some scars and we're tightening her skin. So, she has that feeling of, like, an older Burt Lancaster". The T. rex was portrayed using motion capture, and a full scale T. rex foot was created for lighting reference and to help with framing shots. Following the film's release, fans began referring to the individual as "Rexy".
- According to Trevorrow, the Mosasaurus was designed to resemble the dinosaurs created by Winston for the earlier films: "We made sure to give her a look and a kind of personality in the way we designed her face that recalled Stan Winston's designs for many of the other dinosaurs in this world. She looks like a Jurassic Park dinosaur". The Mosasaurus roars were created with the audio recordings of a walrus and a beluga whale.
- Dimorphodon appears in Jurassic World, marking its first appearance in the series. Using motion capture, dwarf actor Martin Klebba stood in as a Dimorphodon for a scene in which one of the creatures tries to attack Owen. A full scale head of the creature was also created for the scene. Baby brown pelicans provided the vocal effects for the dimorphodons.
- For the Pteranodon, vocal effects were created using audio recordings of a mother osprey defending her chicks against another individual.
- Ankylosaurus, one of Trevorrow's favorite dinosaurs, is featured in the film. It is one of several creatures he felt was deserving of a substantial scene. Trevorrow noted the death of one of the ankylosaurs, by the Indominus, as an example of moments "that are designed to really make these creatures feel like living animals that you can connect to. Especially since so many of the themes in the film involve our relationship with animals on the planet right now, I wanted them to feel real".
- Stegosaurus and Triceratops appear in the film; to animate their movements, which include running, ILM studied and copied rhinos and elephants. According to Trevorrow: "In certain shots, you're looking at real animals running that just have a dinosaur's skin laid over".
- A running herd of approximately 60 Gallimimus makes an appearance in Jurassic World. Image Engine created the scene with more than 400 frames consisting of up to 50 layers that include clumps of grass, dirt and dust. Artists for Image Engine often viewed the dinosaur species' appearance in the first film, in which a group of running Gallimimus are also depicted. Jeremy Mesana, animation supervisor for Image Engine, said: "We were always going back and staring at that little snippet from the first film. It was always interesting trying to find the feeling of the Gallimimus. Trying to capture the same essence of that original shot was really tricky".
- Dilophosaurus appeared in the first film and makes a brief appearance in Jurassic World as a hologram in the theme park's visitor center.
- Spinosaurus is featured in the theme park as a display skeleton that is destroyed when the T. rex is set free and smashes through it. The scene is meant as revenge for an earlier scene in Jurassic Park III, in which a Spinosaurus kills a T. rex.

== Music ==
The musical score was composed by Michael Giacchino, who had previously scored the video games Warpath: Jurassic Park and The Lost World: Jurassic Park. John Williams's themes from previous Jurassic Park scores were incorporated by Giacchino, who said: "It was a really targeted approach, as to where to [include Williams's themes] and where would make the most sense and where would we most appreciate it, as fans ourselves". A soundtrack album was released on June 9, 2015, by Back Lot Music.

== See also ==
- List of films about dinosaurs
