= Jurassic World =

2015 film by Colin Trevorrow

- Theatrical release poster
- Directed by: Colin Trevorrow
- Screenplay by: Rick Jaffa Amanda Silver; Derek Connolly; Colin Trevorrow
- Story by: Rick Jaffa; Amanda Silver
- Based on: Characters by Michael Crichton
- Produced by: Frank Marshall; Patrick Crowley
- Starring: Chris Pratt; Bryce Dallas Howard; Vincent D'Onofrio; Irrfan Khan
- Cinematography: John Schwartzman
- Edited by: Kevin Stitt
- Music by: Michael Giacchino (Note: Original Jurassic Park themes by John Williams)
- Production companies: Universal Pictures; Legendary Pictures; Amblin Entertainment; The Kennedy/Marshall Company
- Distributed by: Universal Pictures
- Release dates: May 29, 2015 (Le Grand Rex); June 12, 2015 (United States)
- Running time: 124 minutes
- Country: United States (Note: Attributed to multiple references:)
- Language: English
- Budget: $150–215 million
- Box office: $1.671 billion

Jurassic World is a 2015 American science fiction action film directed by Colin Trevorrow, who co-wrote the screenplay with Rick Jaffa, Amanda Silver, and Derek Connolly from a story by Jaffa and Silver. It is the first installment in the Jurassic World series and the fourth installment overall in the Jurassic Park franchise, following Jurassic Park III (2001). It stars an ensemble cast including Chris Pratt, Bryce Dallas Howard, Vincent D'Onofrio, and Irrfan Khan; BD Wong reprised his role from the original Jurassic Park film. Set twenty-two years after the events of Jurassic Park, the film takes place on the same fictional island of Isla Nublar, located off the Pacific coast of Costa Rica. A successful theme park of cloned dinosaurs, dubbed Jurassic World, has operated on the island for years, bringing John Hammond's dream to fruition. The park plunges into chaos when a transgenic dinosaur escapes from its enclosure and goes on a rampage.

Universal Pictures intended to begin production of a fourth Jurassic Park film in 2004 for a mid-2005 release, but the project lingered in development hell while the script underwent several revisions. Following a suggestion from executive producer Steven Spielberg, writers Jaffa and Silver explored the idea of a functional dinosaur park. Once Trevorrow was hired as director in 2013 he followed the same idea while developing a new script with Connolly. Filming lasted from April to August 2014 in Louisiana and Hawaii. Like the previous films, the dinosaurs were created by Lucasfilm's Industrial Light & Magic using CGI and by Legacy Effects using life-sized animatronics. Production was completed in May 2015.

Jurassic World premiered at Le Grand Rex in Paris on May 29, 2015, and was theatrically released in the United States on June 12, by Universal Pictures. It received generally favorable reviews, with some critics considering it to be the best Jurassic Park sequel. On release, it set several box office records, including for the largest opening weekend, both domestically and worldwide, and ultimately grossed $1.6 billion worldwide, becoming the second-highest-grossing film of 2015, the third highest-grossing film of all time, the highest-grossing in the Jurassic Park series and the highest-grossing film released by Universal until it was surpassed by The Odyssey in 2026. Three sequels have been released: Jurassic World: Fallen Kingdom (2018), Jurassic World Dominion (2022), and Jurassic World Rebirth (2025).

== Plot ==
Twenty-two years after the Jurassic Park disaster on Isla Nublar in 1993, (Note: As depicted in Jurassic Park (1993)) a new dinosaur theme park called Jurassic World has been built on the island, owned by Masrani Global Corporation in affiliation with InGen, which created the dinosaurs. Brothers Zach and Gray Mitchell visit the park, where their aunt Claire Dearing works as the operations manager. She assigns her assistant Zara to guide them, but they evade her and explore on their own.

Navy veteran and ethologist Owen Grady has been training a Velociraptor squad composed of Blue, Charlie, Delta, and Echo, and researching their intelligence. Based on the raptors' ability to follow commands, the head of InGen security Vic Hoskins believes that the animals can be weaponized, an idea Owen and his assistant Barry vehemently oppose.

Claire and Jurassic World owner Simon Masrani inspect the park's newest upcoming attraction, the Indominus rex, a transgenic dinosaur created by geneticist Dr. Henry Wu. Masrani tasks Owen with evaluating the enclosure's security. Owen warns Claire that the Indominus lacks social skills, making it dangerous and unpredictable. When the Indominus seemingly escapes, Owen and two other workers investigate. The dinosaur, capable of camouflaging itself and masking its heat signature, suddenly appears and devours the other two men, but Owen manages to survive. The Indominus escapes its paddock and into the island's interior. Owen urges Masrani to destroy it, but Masrani, trying to protect his company's investment, sends a unit to subdue it using non-lethal weaponry. After most of the unit is killed, Claire orders the evacuation of the northern sector, while Masrani confronts Wu about the Indominus design.

While exploring the park in a tour vehicle, Zach and Gray enter a restricted area. The Indominus arrives and destroys the vehicle, but the boys narrowly escape. They find the ruins of the original Jurassic Park visitor center, repair an old Jeep Wrangler, and drive back to the park resort.

As Claire and Owen search for the boys, they barely escape the Indominus as well. Masrani and two soldiers hunt the Indominus by helicopter, but it breaks into the park's aviary. The Pteranodons and Dimorphodons, startled by the Indominus, flee the aviary and fly into Masrani's helicopter, causing it to crash and kill its passengers. The escaped pterosaurs converge on the resort and attack everyone, including Zara, who is then devoured by a Mosasaurus. Zach and Gray find Owen and Claire at the resort as armed personnel shoot down the pterosaurs.

Hoskins assumes command and orders the raptors to be used to track the Indominus, whereupon Owen reluctantly complies and spearheads the assault with the raptors. Upon finding it, the dinosaurs begin communicating with one another. Owen realizes that the Indominus has Velociraptor DNA, and it usurps Owen's command of the raptors, becoming the pack's new alpha. Soldiers fire on the Indominus, but it escapes. The raptors slaughter most of the soldiers, while Charlie is killed in the chaos. Hoskins evacuates Wu and the dinosaur embryos from the island to protect his research. Owen, Claire, and the boys find Hoskins at the lab securing more embryos, but Delta breaks in and kills him.

Owen restores his bond with the three surviving raptors before the Indominus reappears. The raptors attack the hybrid, but Delta and Echo are killed while Blue is knocked unconscious. Claire releases Jurassic Park’s veteran Tyrannosaurus rex (Note: Offscreen, this Tyrannosaurus rex is identified as the same individual from Jurassic Park (1993) and is colloquially known as Rexy.) from its paddock and lures it to the Indominus. The dinosaurs attack each other, and the Indominus eventually overpowers the Tyrannosaurus, but Blue recovers and joins the battle. The duo fights the Indominus until it gets cornered at the lagoon's edge, where it is dragged underwater by the Mosasaurus. Owen and Blue part ways afterwards.

The survivors are evacuated, and the island is abandoned once again. Zach and Gray reunite with their parents, while Owen and Claire decide to stay together.

== Cast ==
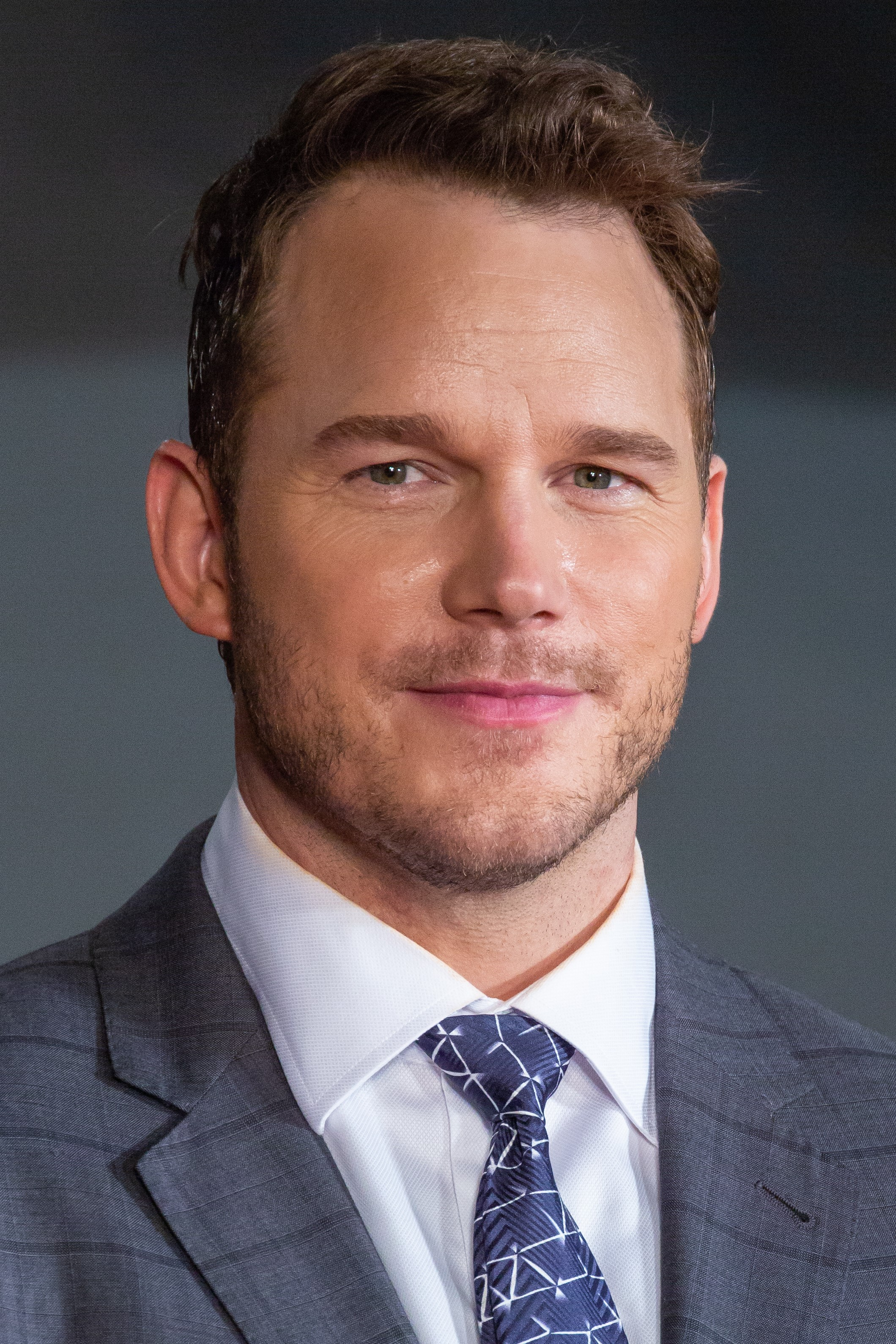
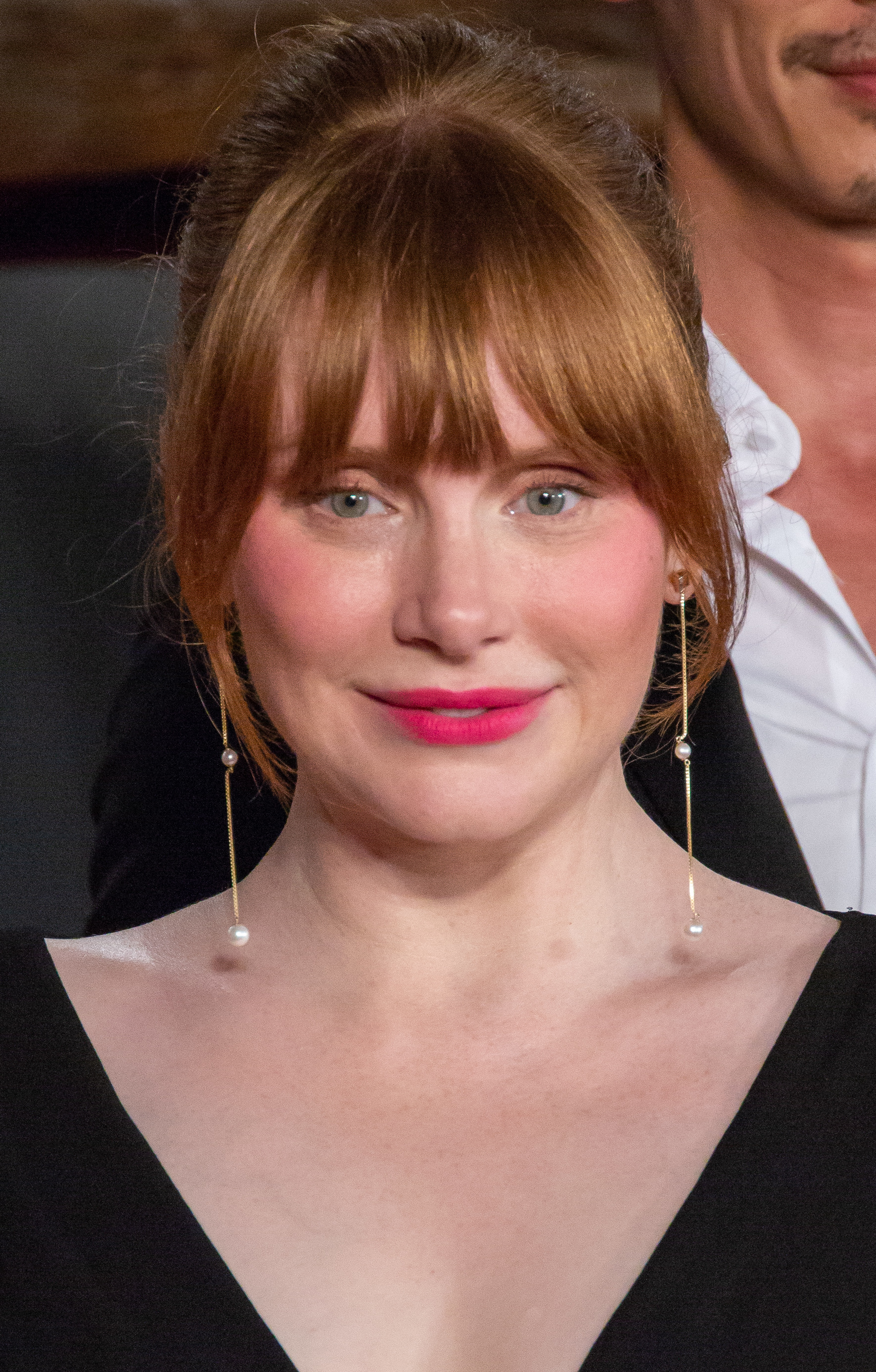
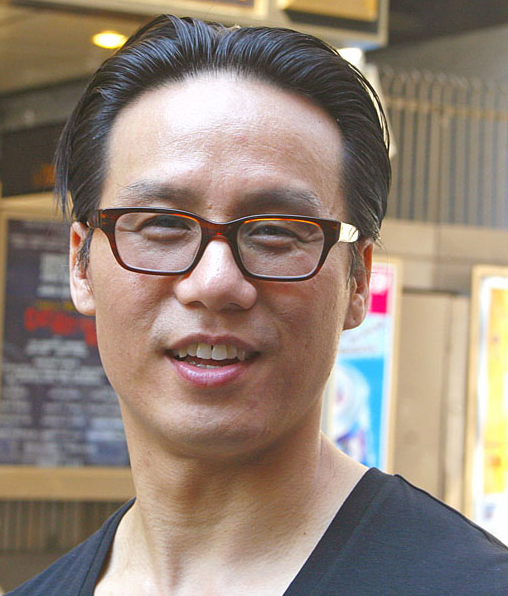
(L&C) Chris Pratt and Bryce Dallas Howard play the film's two leads, while BD Wong (R) reprises his role as Dr. Henry Wu from the first film.
- Chris Pratt as Owen Grady, a Navy veteran and ethologist, and a Velociraptor expert and handler at Jurassic World.
- Bryce Dallas Howard as Claire Dearing, the Jurassic World operations manager and aunt to Zach and Gray Mitchell.
- Vincent D'Onofrio as Vic Hoskins, head of InGen's security operations, who wants to use the Velociraptors as military animals.
- Ty Simpkins as Gray Mitchell, one of Claire's nephews and the younger brother of Zach.
- Nick Robinson as Zach Mitchell, one of Claire's nephews and the older brother of Gray.
- Omar Sy as Barry Sembène, Owen's assistant who helps care for the raptors.
- BD Wong as Dr. Henry Wu, a geneticist who heads the team that created the dinosaurs for Jurassic World as well as the failed original Jurassic Park.
- Irrfan Khan as Simon Masrani, CEO of the Masrani Corporation and the owner of Jurassic World.
- Jake Johnson as Lowery Cruthers, an employee in the park's control room.
- Lauren Lapkus as Vivian, an employee in the park's control room.
- Brian Tee as Hamada, the leader of the ACU (Asset Containment Unit), a group of security guards installed on Isla Nublar.
- Katie McGrath as Zara, Claire's personal assistant.
- Judy Greer as Karen Mitchell, Claire's sister and mother of Zach and Gray.
- Andy Buckley as Scott Mitchell, Karen's husband and father of Zach and Gray.

Additionally, Jimmy Fallon and Jimmy Buffett appear in cameo as themselves, while the film's producer, Patrick Crowley, plays Masrani's flight instructor. Colin Trevorrow briefly provides the voice of Mr. DNA, an animated DNA helix who explains the park's technology to visitors, a character voiced by Greg Burson in Jurassic Park. Brad Bird provides a voice cameo as the park's monorail announcer and Jack Horner, the film's technical advisor, also makes a cameo appearance. Eric Edelstein appears briefly as a paddock supervisor. A photograph of Jeff Goldblum is used to represent his character Dr. Ian Malcolm on the back cover of a book.

== Production ==
=== Development ===
In May 2001, Steven Spielberg had Amblin Entertainment commence the development of ideas for Jurassic Park IV, which he planned to produce. Initially, Jurassic Park III director Joe Johnston was not interested in directing the fourth film. In 2002, William Monahan was announced as screenwriter, and a release date was set for mid-2005. Kathleen Kennedy would produce the film, and Spielberg would serve as executive producer.

An early story idea would partially involve dinosaurs migrating to the Costa Rican mainland. A team of experts, including Dr. Alan Grant and Dr. Ian Malcolm, would chart an expedition to an offshore island and discover the dinosaurs breeding freely. Part of the plot would involve the characters devising a way to restrict the spread of the dinosaurs and prevent an ecological disaster. Early concept art also depicted genetically engineered human-dinosaur mercenaries. Monahan's first draft of the script was finished in July 2003; the story was not set in a jungle, as in previous films. Monahan subsequently left the project to work on Kingdom of Heaven. He was replaced by John Sayles, who wrote two drafts of the script. In one draft, a new character, a mercenary named Nick Harris, would be charged with training a team of genetically modified Deinonychus for use on rescue missions and to combat drug dealers. The concept of a human who trains dinosaurs came from Spielberg. By April 2005, the film had been postponed, as Spielberg was dissatisfied with the script revisions.

Frank Marshall would eventually join the project as a producer. Progress on the film stalled during 2005 as Marshall and Spielberg were busy with other film projects. Additional work on the film was expected to begin following the release of a fourth Indiana Jones film, which Marshall and Spielberg were working on. In 2006, Spielberg said Johnston would direct the film, but by April 2007, Johnston was no longer involved as director. A release date of 2008 was expected, but was later delayed to 2009. By 2010, Johnston was involved with the project again and planned for the film to be the first in a new Jurassic Park trilogy. Johnston hoped to further develop the project with Spielberg after they finished other projects, including Johnston's 2011 film, Captain America: The First Avenger.

In 2011, writer Mark Protosevich was hired. He wrote two story treatments, neither of which were approved. Spielberg and Kennedy felt that the film did not yet have an adequate story. In 2012, Rick Jaffa and Amanda Silver were hired to write the script. The writers incorporated three ideas from Spielberg: a fully functioning dinosaur theme park, a human who has a relationship with trained raptors (from Sayles's earlier draft), and a human-eating dinosaur that escapes and has to be stopped.

=== Pre-production ===
In January 2013, Universal set a release date of June 13, 2014. Kennedy left the project soon thereafter to focus on the upcoming Star Wars sequel trilogy. In March 2013, Colin Trevorrow was hired as director, and Patrick Crowley was announced as a producer alongside Marshall. Trevorrow and his writing partner, Derek Connolly, rewrote the earlier draft by Jaffa and Silver while retaining Spielberg's three story ideas. The film's release was delayed by a year to give the writers time to perfect the script. In September 2013, Universal confirmed the film's title Jurassic World, with a release scheduled for June 12, 2015. The film is set 22 years after the events of Jurassic Park, and is considered a direct sequel to that film; although The Lost World: Jurassic Park and Jurassic Park III remain canon in the series, Jurassic World ignores their events as they occurred on a different island.

Between 2003 and 2008, several cast members from previous Jurassic Park films were expected to reprise their roles, including Sam Neill as Dr. Alan Grant, Jeff Goldblum as Dr. Ian Malcolm, Richard Attenborough as John Hammond, and Laura Dern as Dr. Ellie Sattler. Attenborough retired from acting following a fall at his house in 2008. A statue of his character is featured in the film. Trevorrow and Connolly did not want to bring back the other characters unless there would be a good reason for them to be involved in the story; they considered Dr. Henry Wu, the scientist responsible for recreating dinosaurs, a logical choice.

In September 2013, Bryce Dallas Howard was cast. In October 2013, Ty Simpkins and Nick Robinson joined the cast while Josh Brolin was "in talks" for a role. In November 2013, Chris Pratt was cast after Brolin passed on the part. Brolin later elaborated on his decision to decline the role: "I could not picture me being that guy... I think I knew from a big-picture standpoint that somebody else would do a much better job than me." In February 2014, Vincent D'Onofrio and Irrfan Khan joined the cast, while BD Wong was set to reprise his role as Wu, marking the character's first appearance since the original Jurassic Park film in 1993. On reprising his role after two decades, Wong stated: "I think it's really fun for me. Not only for me to be playing the same character, but also for it to be so long... I felt a little left out of the first one. This was a really sweet return to putting some finishing touches on a character that felt to me rather slim."In March 2014, Omar Sy joined the cast. In April 2014, Judy Greer, Katie McGrath and Lauren Lapkus joined the cast. In May 2014, Andy Buckley joined the cast. In July 2014, Courtney James Clark joined the cast.

=== Filming ===
Principal photography began on April 10, 2014, in Hawaii. Filming locations there included the islands of Kauai and Oahu. The Indominus rex enclosure was among the shooting locations on the latter island. Filming continued in Hawaii until June 2014, before moving to Louisiana. The Main Street and boardwalk area of the fictional Jurassic World theme park was constructed in the parking lot of the abandoned Six Flags New Orleans park. NASA's Michoud Assembly Facility in New Orleans was also used to construct interior sets representing the Jurassic World park. Other sets constructed at the facility included a Mosasaurus feeding show and a raptor enclosure.

The film includes a scene in which Claire's assistant Zara (portrayed by Katie McGrath) is carried off by several Pteranodon before falling into the park's lagoon, where she is eaten by the Mosasaurus, marking the first female death in the film series. Trevorrow wanted to make it "the most spectacular death we can possibly imagine", while also wanting to surprise moviegoers, stating: "Let's have someone die who just doesn't deserve to die at all."

Stan Winston provided animatronic dinosaurs for the previous Jurassic Park films and intended to do the same for the fourth film before he died in 2008. Instead, Winston's former colleagues at Legacy Effects provided an animatronic Apatosaurus for the film. Maquettes were used to depict the velociraptors during certain scenes, and some dinosaurs were created through the use of motion capture. The remaining dinosaurs were computer-generated by Industrial Light & Magic. Filming concluded on August 5, 2014. The budget was reported to be $150–215 million.

== Music ==
The musical score was composed by Michael Giacchino, who had previously scored the video games Warpath: Jurassic Park and The Lost World: Jurassic Park. John Williams' themes from previous Jurassic Park scores were incorporated by Giacchino, who said: "It was a really targeted approach, as to where to [include Williams's themes] and where would make the most sense and where would we most appreciate it, as fans ourselves". A soundtrack album was released on June 9, 2015, by Back Lot Music.

== Marketing ==
The first official pictures of the film set were released in April 2014, and were followed by the release of the first film stills in June. During the 2014 San Diego Comic-Con, five hundred copies of a limited-edition Jurassic World poster by Mark Englert were given out. Audiences at the convention were disappointed by the lack of Jurassic World footage; what they thought to be footage for the film was a teaser trailer announcement for Legendary Pictures' upcoming film, Skull Island.

Two viral marketing websites, one for the fictional Masrani Global Corporation and one for the Jurassic World theme park, were launched in November 2014. The Masrani website was created by Jack Anthony Ewins and Timothy Glover, two Jurassic Park fans who had earlier created a website for the fictional Patel Corporation; Khan was initially reported to be playing a park owner with the surname Patel. After some fans mistook the Patel website for an official website associated with the film, Universal hired Ewins and Glover in April the same year to design the Masrani website and to add their own backstory to it. The Masrani website included information that was absent from the film, such as details of the company's purchase of InGen and about the park's origins. It also featured videos showing D'Onofrio and Wong talking in-character about the fictional company.

The theme park website featured a high level of fictional detail, including hotel accommodations, weather reports and wait times for rides. Paleontologist Brian Switek was hired in early 2015 to ensure the accuracy of dinosaur information on the theme park website. Trevorrow wrote fictional customer comments for the site; he said: "It was then that I realized I'd gone too far down the rabbit hole." Closed circuit video shown on the control room monitors was filmed during production and was also added to the theme park website.

A teaser trailer was released online on November 23, 2014, followed by the first full trailer two days later; it had initially been scheduled to air on NBC two days later during a Thanksgiving football game. The film was marketed with the tagline "The park is open". Marketing continued in 2015: a television advertisement for the film premiered during Super Bowl XLIX in February. A clip from the film was aired on MTV on April 8, and depicted the character Owen arguing with Claire about the treatment of the park's dinosaurs. Film director and writer Joss Whedon criticized the clip, calling it "'70s-era sexist": "She's a stiff, he's a life-force—really? Still?" Trevorrow later stated he was not bothered by Whedon's comments and that "to be honest, I don't totally disagree with him. I wonder why [Universal] chose a clip like that, that shows an isolated situation within a movie that has an internal logic. That starts with characters that are almost archetypes, stereotypes that are deconstructed as the story progresses." Howard also considered the clip to be a marketing mistake.

Later in April, three new posters for the film were released during a three-day period leading up to the premiere of the final trailer. Trevorrow was disappointed with Universal because he felt the trailers showed "far more of this movie than I would have ever wanted". Trevorrow stated that because of the film's cost, the trailers included scenes Universal felt were necessary to ensure its financial success after the studio's disappointment with Jurassic Park III's box-office performance. Universal spent $34.9 million on television advertisements for the film. Companies including Kellogg's, Dairy Queen and Barbasol served as promotional partners for the film, and Lego and Hasbro released toys based on it. Two video games, Lego Jurassic World and Jurassic World: The Game, were released in 2015. Tippett Studio worked with Universal and Efexio to create an application titled "Jurassic World Mobile MovieMaker", which adds images of dinosaurs to a background photograph.

== Release ==
=== Theatrical ===
The world premiere of Jurassic World was held on May 29, 2015, at the Grand Rex cinema in Paris. The film was theatrically released in 66 territories from June 10 to 12. In North America, advance screenings were held at Majestic 10 Cinemas in Williston, Vermont on the 10th, before opening two days later in 4,273 venues, the largest-ever screen count for Universal. The film was released in Japan on August 5, the last market in which it was released.

Worldwide, Jurassic World was released across 809 IMAX theaters—364 of which were in North America—making it the third-largest worldwide release for any movie in IMAX's history and the largest day-and-date IMAX release ever. Universal relaunched the film in IMAX 3D in theaters for one week on August 28 in the United States and Canada.

=== Home media ===
Jurassic World was released by Universal Pictures Home Entertainment on DVD, Blu-ray, and Blu-ray 3D on October 20, 2015. Upon release, it sold nearly three million Blu-ray and DVD units in its first week, making it the highest-selling home entertainment live-action film, both for Universal and of 2015. Across all digital and physical formats, Jurassic World collected $82.6 million in its first week. At the end of 2015, it was named the second-highest-selling video of the year in the UK, selling 1.05 million copies since its release. It was the third-highest-selling DVD and the second-highest-selling Blu-ray in the country. In 2018, Jurassic World was included in the Jurassic Park 25th Anniversary Collection and released for the first time in 4K UHD Blu-Ray format.

== Reception ==
=== Box office ===
Box office revenue			Box office ranking		Reference
United States and Canada	Other territories	Worldwide	All time U.S. and Canada	All time worldwide	Reference
$653,406,625	$1,018,130,819	$1,671,537,444	No. 10	No. 11	

Box office records set by Jurassic World (Note: Records set by the movie during its theatrical run.) (Note: Revenue presented in million dollars.)
USA & Canada		Worldwide	
Record	Achievement	Record	Achievement
Opening weekend (Note: Records for Universal Pictures, its distributor, as well.)	$208.8	Worldwide opening weekend	$524.4
Second weekend	$106.7	Overseas opening weekend	$315.6
IMAX gross during opening weekend	$20.6	IMAX worldwide opening weekend	$44.1
Cinemark XD gross during opening weekend	$4.3	IMAX overseas opening weekend	$23.5
June opening day & weekend	$81.9 & $208.8	IMAX worldwide single-day gross	$13
Premium large formats gross during opening weekend	$16.2	Fastest to $80 million in IMAX ticket sales	12 days
Fastest-grossing (days)	$100 (2) $200 (3) $300 (8) $400 (10) $500 (17)	Fastest-grossing (days)	$1,000 (13)
Weekend theater average	$48,855		
Non-opening day gross	Monday ($25.3); Tuesday ($24.3)		
Notes

Jurassic World grossed over $653 million in the United States and Canada and $1.018 billion in other countries for a worldwide total of $1.671 billion. It was the second-highest-grossing film of 2015 and the third-highest-grossing film of all time. The film set a box office record during its opening weekend, becoming the first film to collect over $500 million in a single weekend, beating the previous worldwide record held by Harry Potter and the Deathly Hallows – Part 2. It crossed the $1 billion mark within 14 days, making it the fastest film at the time to reach that milestone, surpassing Furious 7. Deadline Hollywood calculated the film's net profit as $474 million, accounting for production budgets, marketing, talent participations, and other costs; box office grosses and home media revenues placed it third on their list of 2015's "Most Valuable Blockbusters". It is also the second of three films following Furious 7 and Minions to surpass $1 million in 4DX admissions worldwide.

==== United States and Canada ====
Predictions for the opening of Jurassic World in the U.S. and Canada were continuously revised upwards, starting from $125 million to $200 million. It opened on Friday, June 12, 2015, in 4,274 theaters and earned $81.9 million on its opening day, marking the fifth-biggest opening day and the fifth-biggest single-day gross, as well as the highest June opening day, surpassing The Twilight Saga: Eclipse. The film's Friday gross included $18.5 million from 3,229 theaters in its early Thursday showings—a record for Universal. Excluding Thursday-night grosses, the film earned the largest opening-day gross ($63.5 million). It also set a single-day IMAX record of $8.6 million and a Saturday-and-Sunday gross record of $69.6 million and $57.2 million, respectively. In total, it earned $208,806,270 for its debut weekend, setting an opening-weekend record and an IMAX opening record of $20.6 million—10.2% of the total opening gross—from 363 IMAX theaters, surpassing The Avengers and The Dark Knight Rises simultaneously. Additionally, the film had the largest June opening weekend, breaking the previous record held by Man of Steel. It also surpassed Guardians of the Galaxy to achieve the highest opening weekend for a Chris Pratt film. 3D accounted for 48% of the total opening gross. RealD 3D comprised $70 million of the opening gross. The opening-weekend audience was evenly split between under-25s over-25s—39% were under age 25, 61% age 25 years and above. 52% of the audience were male and 48% were female. On its fourth day of release, Jurassic World made $25.6 million, making it the third-highest Monday gross, after Spider-Man 2 and Indiana Jones and the Kingdom of the Crystal Skull. This was also the biggest non-holiday Monday gross of any film at the time, knocking out The Dark Knight.

The film set a record for the largest second-weekend gross, its revenue dropping by 49% to $106.6 million and it topped the North American box office for three consecutive weekends. Other records set by the film at the time include the biggest weekend-per-theater average for a wide release—$48,855 per theater— the fastest film to reach $100 million and each additional $50 million through $600 million, and the largest cumulative gross through every day of release until and including its fifty-third day—with the exception of its first day. As of June 21, 2015, screenings in RealD, IMAX and premium large format had grossed $132 million, $42 million and $23.1 million, respectively. On Friday, July 17, the movie's revenue reached $600 million, becoming the fourth and quickest to do so in 36 days.

==== Other territories ====
Jurassic World was released in 63 countries. Outside the United States and Canada, the film opened on Wednesday, June 10, in eight countries, earning $24 million. On Thursday, June 11, it grossed another $46 million from 37 markets for a two-day total of $70 million from 45 countries. It was released in 21 more countries on June 12, earning $60 million, which is Universal's highest-grossing international Friday of all time, for a three-day total of $130 million from 66 countries. Until Sunday, June 14, it had a five-day opening weekend total of $316.1 million from 66 countries from 19,612 screens, representing 31% of its overseas gross and setting an opening-weekend record, surpassing Harry Potter and the Deathly Hallows – Part 2. This included an IMAX opening record of $23.5 million from 443 IMAX theaters in 56 countries, surpassing the record that was previously held by Transformers: Age of Extinction. 3D showings accounted for 65% of the film's revenue (equivalent to $205 million). Additional records include the highest single-day IMAX gross with $6.5 million on Saturday, June 12. Revenues in its second weekend dropped by 47.4% to $166.7 million, according to Box Office Mojo. Deadline Hollywood reported a 48.3% drop to $163.4 million. Jurassic World topped the box office outside of North America for three consecutive weekends.

The film had the biggest opening day of all time for Universal in Hong Kong; the second-biggest in Australia, France, Indonesia, the Philippines, Russia, and South Korea; and the biggest opening day of all time in Panama. It also scored the biggest opening for Universal in nine countries, including Australia, China, Ecuador, France, Hong Kong, and Malta. In China, it grossed $17.77 million on its opening day (including $1.39 million from midnight runs), which is the tenth-biggest of all time and went on to earn $100.1 million in its opening weekend, which is the third-biggest of all time. It also scored the second-biggest IMAX opening there with $11.8 million. Following China, its largest openings outside of the U.S. and Canada occurred in the UK, Ireland and Malta ($30.1 million), France and the Maghreb region ($14.7 million), Mexico ($14.6 million), South Korea ($14.2 million) and Japan ($13 million). In South Korea, the film was released during the 2015 MERS outbreak as the U.S. film studios were debarred from altering their scheduled dates, resulting in the film's attendance to fall from that date and the local films' release dates to be postponed by their distributors. IMAX ticket sales grossed $42.1 million as of June 21, 2015. In total earnings, its largest markets outside the United States and Canada were China ($205.2 million), the United Kingdom ($100.4 million), Japan ($75.2 million), Germany ($49.2 million), Mexico ($44.3 million), and South Korea ($43.9 million).

=== Critical response ===
On the review aggregator website Rotten Tomatoes, Jurassic World has an approval rating of 72% based on 356 reviews and an average rating of 6.70/10. Its critical consensus reads: "Jurassic World can't match the original for sheer inventiveness and impact, but it works in its own right as an entertaining – and visually dazzling – popcorn thriller". On Metacritic, the film has a score of 59 out of 100 based on 49 critics, indicating "mixed or average" reviews. Audiences polled by CinemaScore gave the film an average grade of "A" on an A+ to F scale.

Peter Bradshaw of The Guardian gave the film four stars out of five and said it is a "terrifically enjoyable and exciting summer spectacular" and "savvy, funny, ridiculous in just the right way". Robbie Collin of The Telegraph also awarded it four stars, deeming it a worthy sequel to the original Jurassic Park and calling it "methodically paced and shot with an awestruck visual sense that's pure Spielberg". Peter Travers of Rolling Stone gave it three stars out of four and wrote: "It's not the cynical, cash-in cheesefest you feared. OK, Jurassic World is a little of that. But this state-of-the-art dino epic is also more than a blast of rumbling, roaring, 'did you effing see that!' fun". He praised Trevorrow's direction, Pratt's and Howard's performances and the effects. Writing for The Hollywood Reporter, Todd McCarthy said the film was not "terribly scary" and criticized the romance between Owen and Claire, but he praised the CGI implementation, the film's musical score, and claimed there is a "certain low-key affability about Trevorrow's approach that marks him a likeable humanist". UK film website Movie Metropolis rated the film four stars out of five noting that while Jurassic World is missing some "soul" and "charm" from the original, it is the first sequel "worthy of the brand". David Crow, writing for Den of Geek, considered Jurassic World a legacy sequel and wrote that it gave fans "everything they loved about the first one without trying to change things up".

The Associated Press praised Pratt and Howard's performances but rated the film two stars out of four, calling it "an ugly, over-saturated movie" that lacks the "deft sense of wonderment, wit and suspense that guided the original". Ann Hornaday of The Washington Post also rated it two stars out of four, writing "every action movie today ends up as Transformers and, even when it's cloned creatures fighting, the same is true here (with an antic dash of "Sharknado" tossed in for good measure). It's not ambition or technical know-how or even plucky resourcefulness that save the day in Jurassic World, it's good old-fashioned anthropomorphism. Humans, it seems, never learn. But if we did, where would sequels come from?"

Spielberg said, "To see Jurassic World come to life is almost like seeing Jurassic Park come true", while Sam Neill also praised the film and its acting. Several news publications, as well as Neill, noted the violence of the franchise's first notable depiction of a woman being killed onscreen, and Entertainment Weekly wrote: "There's nothing amusing about the demise of Zara, who's as close to 'real people' as Jurassic World gets, and it's that unsettling quality about her death that more Hollywood disaster epics need in order to reclaim their visceral emotional prowess". Several news outlets, such as The New York Times, New York and Slate, considered the film's depiction of Claire, including her use of high heels throughout the film, to be sexist. Additionally, several websites have noted plot and character similarities between Jurassic World and the 1999 film Deep Blue Sea. Entertainment website Dark Horizons stated in its coverage of Jurassic World that "some aren't warming to the Deep Blue Sea meets Jaws 3-D storyline", while entertainment website Flickering Myth posted the story "Deja Vu: Isn't Jurassic World just Deep Blue Sea with dinosaurs?", which outlined plot and character similarities between the two films.

=== Accolades ===
Year	Award / Film Festival	Category	Recipients	Result	Ref.
2015	Teen Choice Awards	Choice Movie: Villain	Vincent D'Onofrio	Nominated	
2015	Teen Choice Awards	Choice Summer Movie		Nominated	
2015	Teen Choice Awards	Choice Summer Movie Star: Male	Chris Pratt	Nominated	
2015	Teen Choice Awards	Choice Summer Movie Star: Female	Bryce Dallas Howard	Nominated	
2015	Teen Choice Awards	Choice Movie: Hissy Fit	Bryce Dallas Howard	Nominated	
2015	Hollywood Film Awards	Hollywood Visual Effects Award	Tim Alexander	Won	
2015	World Soundtrack Academy	Film Composer of the Year	Michael Giacchino (also for Dawn of the Planet of the Apes, Inside Out, Jupiter Ascending, Tomorrowland)	Won	
2016	People's Choice Awards	Favorite Movie		Nominated	
2016	People's Choice Awards	Favorite Movie Actor	Chris Pratt	Nominated	
2016	People's Choice Awards	Favorite Action Movie		Nominated	
2016	People's Choice Awards	Favorite Action Movie Actor	Chris Pratt	Nominated	
2016	Critics' Choice Movie Awards	Best Action Movie		Nominated	
2016	Critics' Choice Movie Awards	Best Sci-Fi/Horror Movie		Nominated	
2016	Critics' Choice Movie Awards	Best Actor in an Action Movie	Chris Pratt	Nominated	
2016	Critics' Choice Movie Awards	Best Actress in an Action Movie	Bryce Dallas Howard	Nominated	
2016	Critics' Choice Movie Awards	Best Visual Effects		Nominated	
2016	Screen Actors Guild Awards	Outstanding Action Performance By Stunt Ensemble Motion Picture		Nominated	
2016	Art Directors Guild	Excellence in Production Design for a Feature Film – Fantasy Film	Edward Verreaux	Nominated	
2016	Visual Effects Society	Outstanding Created Environment in a Photoreal Feature	Martyn Culpitt, Jao Sita, Yuta Shimizu, Michael Billette (for Jungle Chase)	Nominated	
2016	Visual Effects Society	Outstanding Models in a Photoreal or Animated Project	Steve Jubinville, Martin Murphy, Aaron Gret, Kevin Reuter (for Indominus Rex)	Nominated	
2016	Annie Awards	Animated Effects in a Live Action Production		Nominated	
2016	Annie Awards	Character Animation in a Live Action Production	Indominus Rex	Nominated	
2016	Satellite Awards	Best Sound (Editing and Mixing)	Christopher Boyes, Pete Horner, Kirk Francis, Al Nelson and Gwendolyn Yates Whittle	Nominated	
2016	Satellite Awards	Best Visual Effects	Tim Alexander, Glen McIntosh, Tony Plett and Michael Meinardus	Nominated	
2016	Kids' Choice Awards	Favorite Movie		Nominated	
2016	Kids' Choice Awards	Favorite Movie Actor	Chris Pratt	Nominated	
2016	MTV Movie Awards	Movie of the Year		Nominated	
2016	MTV Movie Awards	Best Male Performance	Chris Pratt	Nominated	
2016	MTV Movie Awards	Best Action Performance	Chris Pratt	Won	
2016	Empire Awards	Best Sci-Fi/Fantasy		Nominated	
2016	Empire Awards	Best Visual Effects		Nominated	
2016	Saturn Award	Best Science Fiction		Nominated	
2016	Saturn Award	Best Director	Colin Trevorrow	Nominated	
2016	Saturn Award	Best Writing	Rick Jaffa, Amanda Silver, Derek Connolly, and Colin Trevorrow	Nominated	
2016	Saturn Award	Best Performance by a Younger Actor	Ty Simpkins	Won	
2016	Saturn Award	Best Editing	Kevin Stitt	Nominated	
2016	Saturn Award	Best Production Design	Ed Verreaux	Nominated	
2016	Saturn Award	Best Special Effects	John Rosengrant, Michael Lantieri, and Tim Alexander	Nominated	

== Themes and analysis ==
Trevorrow said the Indominus rex is symbolic of consumer and corporate excess, and is meant to "embody [humanity's] worst tendencies. We're surrounded by wonder and yet we want more, and we want it bigger, faster, louder, better. And in the world of the movie, the animal is designed based on a series of corporate focus groups". He also stated that "there's something in the film about our greed and our desire for profit. The Indominus rex, to me, is very much that desire, that need to be satisfied". Film journalists have noted parallels between the workings of the park in Jurassic World and of the film and entertainment industry. Actor James DuMont, who has a small role in the film, said "the person [and] the environment are one" is an obvious theme; another theme is "those who do not stop evil are supporting and encouraging it".

The film also explores animal rights concepts; the Indominus rex was raised in captivity and in complete isolation, making the creature "not fully functional". Trevorrow has cited the 2013 documentary film Blackfish, which is critical of the captive orca at SeaWorld, as a key inspiration for Jurassic World. Captive orca Tilikum, which was raised partly in isolation and was responsible for the deaths of three people, served as an inspiration for the Indominus rex, and the public relations and corporate excesses of SeaWorld depicted in the documentary inspired the fictional park in Jurassic World.

== Criticism and controversies ==
=== Scientific accuracy ===
To maintain continuity with the previous films, Jurassic World does not feature any feathered dinosaurs. The first Jurassic Park film was lauded by paleontologists for depicting dinosaurs accurately and in keeping with the science of the time, but later discoveries have refuted the view of dinosaurs as invariably scaly creatures. Jurassic World was criticized for purposely ignoring new discoveries and knowledge. Several paleontologists called the film a "dumb monster movie" for failing to include new discoveries about the creatures; for example, the feathers or proto-feathers that covered some dinosaurs and the way Velociraptor held its front limbs. Many paleontologists considered the dinosaurs a retrograde step from the original Jurassic Park.

In response to these criticisms, Trevorrow said that Jurassic World was "very inaccurate" because it is a science fiction film rather than a documentary. The film includes a scene addressing the topic, as Dr. Henry Wu says that such inaccuracies can be attributed to the fact that the dinosaurs are genetically engineered animals. A fictional review on the film's theme park website speculates that the use of amphibian DNA to fill the gaps in the dinosaur DNA—a plot point in the original novel and film—prevented the dinosaurs from growing feathers. The filmmakers had planned to depict feathered dinosaurs early in the film's development.

=== Writing credits dispute ===
Trevorrow and Connolly were originally intended to be credited as the sole writers, and were listed as such in the film's Super Bowl trailer. At the end of March 2015, a Writers Guild of America (WGA) arbitration panel ruled that Trevorrow and Connolly would instead share a "screenplay by" credit with Jaffa and Silver. Although Trevorrow and Connolly strongly disagreed with this decision, they accepted it after realizing they had no grounds to appeal under WGA rules.

A few days later, the WGA panel also ruled that Jaffa and Silver would receive a "story by" credit. Trevorrow and Connolly strongly disagreed with this as well, but did not appeal the ruling. Despite a difference of opinion on the final credits, Trevorrow said he and Connolly were on peaceful terms with the earlier writing team: "Though we may not agree on the specifics of this ruling, we share a disdain for the arbitration process and the ugliness it often breeds. Our conversations ended in a spirit I'd like to think the Guild would support — that credit could be equally shared."

== Sequels ==
Trevorrow said in 2014 that sequels to Jurassic World had been discussed. The first sequel, titled Jurassic World: Fallen Kingdom, was released in June 2018. Trevorrow and Connolly returned to write the script for the sequel, which features Pratt and Howard reprising their roles, Trevorrow acted as an executive producer with Spielberg. J. A. Bayona directed the film, which serves as the middle chapter of the Jurassic World trilogy. Jurassic World Dominion was released in June 2022, with Trevorrow returning as director. Pratt and Howard also reprise their roles.

== Rides and other media ==
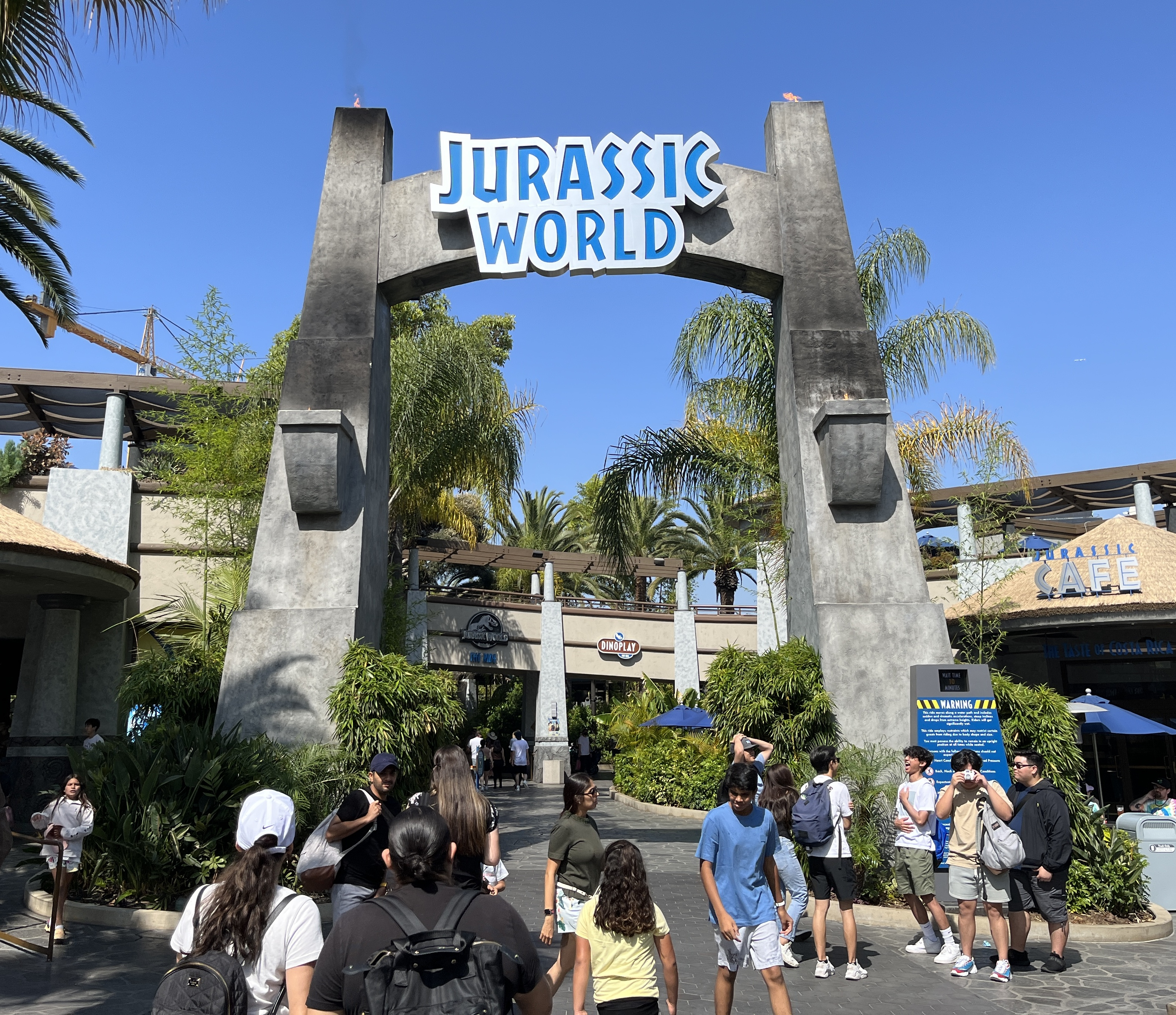
Jurassic World ride at Universal Studios Hollywood.

Jurassic World eventually led to several theme park rides. Jurassic World: The Ride opened at Universal Studios Hollywood in 2019. It is a refurbishment of the original Jurassic Park: The Ride, which operated from 1996 to 2018. In 2021, Universal Islands of Adventure opened a roller coaster attraction known as VelociCoaster, based on the Jurassic World films.

The film also led to animated projects, including several in the Lego Jurassic World line, such as Lego Jurassic World: The Indominus Escape, a 2016 short film; Lego Jurassic World: The Secret Exhibit, a 2018 television special; and Lego Jurassic World: Legend of Isla Nublar, a 2019 miniseries.

A computer-animated television series titled Jurassic World Camp Cretaceous premiered on September 18, 2020. It was a co-production between Netflix, Universal Pictures, DreamWorks Animation, and Amblin Entertainment. The series ran for five seasons, for a total of 49 episodes.

In 2018, Frontier Developments released Jurassic World Evolution, a film-based construction and management simulation game that allows players to build their own Jurassic World park.

== See also ==
- List of films featuring dinosaurs
