= Henry Wu (Jurassic Park) =

Jurassic Park character

- Jurassic Park character
- BD Wong as Dr. Henry Wu in Jurassic World (2015)
- First appearance: Jurassic Park (novel; 1990)
- Last appearance: Jurassic World: Chaos Theory (2025)
- Created by: Michael Crichton
- Adapted by: Steven Spielberg; David Koepp
- Portrayed by: BD Wong
- Voiced by: Bill Ten Eyeck (Jurassic Park: Operation Genesis); BD Wong (Lego Jurassic World, Lego Jurassic World: The Indominus Escape, Jurassic World Evolution); Vincent Tong (Lego Jurassic World: The Secret Exhibit, Lego Jurassic World: Legend of Isla Nublar, Lego Jurassic World: Double Trouble); Greg Chun (Jurassic World Camp Cretaceous, Jurassic World: Chaos Theory)

In-universe information
- Occupation: Geneticist
- Significant other: Charlotte Lockwood

Dr. Henry Wu is a fictional character in the Jurassic Park franchise. He is introduced in Michael Crichton's 1990 novel Jurassic Park, which began the franchise. He also appears briefly in the novel's 1993 film adaptation and plays a larger role in the Jurassic World film trilogy. Dr. Wu is the lead geneticist for the dinosaur theme parks Jurassic Park and Jurassic World, overseeing the de-extinction of dinosaurs through genetic engineering. He is killed by a Velociraptor in the book, but survives throughout the film series, in which he is portrayed by actor BD Wong. Although Wu is a supporting character in the novel, he has a drastically reduced role in the film adaptation, directed by Steven Spielberg. Wong and Wu are both Asian-American, and the actor believed that the role was reduced, to his disappointment, because of "racial exclusion in Hollywood".

Wong was skeptical that he would ever reprise the role, but eventually did so for the fourth film in the franchise, Jurassic World (2015). It was directed by Colin Trevorrow, who co-wrote the script with Derek Connolly. The writers viewed Wu as a logical character to return, considering his role in recreating dinosaurs. Wong is the only actor from any of the previous films to appear in Jurassic World, and he and Trevorrow were happy to revisit the character after his minor role in the first film. Wong reprised the role again for the sequels, Jurassic World: Fallen Kingdom (2018) and Jurassic World Dominion (2022), which were also co-written by Trevorrow.

In the Jurassic World trilogy, Wu secretly creates weaponized hybrid dinosaur called scorpius rex at the behest of others, although the animals later escape and wreak havoc. In Dominion, he secretly engineers giant locusts for his employer, Biosyn, which unleashes the insects to consume rival crops in a plot to control the world food supply. The character undergoes a redemption when he expresses regret for his actions and eventually stops the locust outbreak. Wu is sometimes considered a villain in the Jurassic World films, although Wong believes the character is misunderstood, stating that his research is well intentioned and driven by the demands of others.

Aside from the films, Wong also reprised the role for the video games Jurassic World Evolution (2018) and Jurassic World Aftermath (2020), as well as two theme park attractions, Jurassic World: The Ride and VelociCoaster.

== Fictional background ==
Dr. Henry Wu is the chief geneticist at Jurassic Park, a theme park featuring genetically engineered dinosaurs on the fictional island of Isla Nublar. Wu was recruited by the park's owner, John Hammond, to bring dinosaurs back from extinction for use as attractions.

=== Novels ===
In the novel, Wu was a student of geneticist Norman Atherton, who was Hammond's partner in the Jurassic Park project. After Atherton died of cancer, Wu was personally recruited by Hammond to join the project. Wu is eager to make his mark in the science world, and Hammond gives him an opportunity to do so, offering him a $50 million budget to create living dinosaurs within five years. Wu joins Hammond's company, InGen, and is ultimately successful in his task.

On Isla Nublar, Wu provides a tour of the theme park's laboratory facilities to a group of visitors, which includes Dr. Alan Grant, Dr. Ellie Sattler, and Dr. Ian Malcolm. He also answers their questions about the recreation of the dinosaurs. Wu had used the DNA of other animals, including frogs, to fill in gaps in the dinosaur genomes. He often questions how accurate the dinosaurs are compared to their prehistoric counterparts.

With Jurassic Park scheduled to open the following year, Wu finds his influence waning, as Hammond is increasingly unwilling to listen to his suggestions. Wu proposes genetically altering future dinosaurs to accommodate the public's perception of them as slow-moving animals. This would also make them easier to manage, with Wu noting that many early assumptions about the behavior and biology of the animals had been proven wrong once they were brought back to life. However, Hammond dismisses the idea, stating that such alterations would eliminate authenticity in the animals. Wu responds: "But they're not real now. That's what I'm trying to tell you. There isn't any reality here".

Multiple measures are in place to prevent dinosaur breeding at Jurassic Park; this includes engineering all the animals as female. However, it is later discovered that the use of frog DNA allows them to change sex, making reproduction possible. According to the novel, Wu privately considers the breeding ability a "tremendous validation" of his work, because it implies that he had "put all the pieces together correctly", creating "an animal millions of years old, with such precision that the creature could even reproduce itself".

Several dinosaurs eventually break out of their enclosures due to the actions of Dennis Nedry, a disgruntled park employee who temporarily shuts down security features in order to steal dinosaur embryos. Wu is killed during a Velociraptor assault on the park's hotel, when a raptor jumps onto him from the roof and guts him. Wu's intestines are consumed by the raptor as he struggles, and fails, to fight it off.

Wu is mentioned indirectly in Michael Crichton's sequel novel, The Lost World, when Malcolm discovers old InGen documents addressed to "H. Wu" and a picture of a "bespectacled Chinese man in a white lab coat", both found on Isla Sorna.

=== Films ===
==== Jurassic Park ====
Wu has a greatly reduced role in the first film, appearing in only one scene at the park's laboratory. As in the novel, he answers some questions from Grant, Sattler and Malcolm about the dinosaurs. Prior to that point, much of the dinosaur cloning process is already explained by a new character, Mr. DNA. After the laboratory discussion, Wu is not seen again and his whereabouts are not specified.

==== Jurassic World ====
Set 22 years after the events of the first film, Jurassic World features an operational dinosaur theme park on Isla Nublar, with Wu again working as lead geneticist. Prior to the events of the film, Wu was tasked by Jurassic World owner Simon Masrani with creating a new attraction to boost park attendance. He creates a genetically modified hybrid dinosaur, Indominus rex, by using the genome of a Tyrannosaurus rex as a template and combining it with genetics of a Velociraptor and other animals.

After the Indominus escapes, Wu declines to specify the animal's genetic make-up, stating that he is not at liberty to reveal such information. When Masrani informs Wu of the Indominus's ability to camouflage and to regulate its body temperature, Wu relents and reveals that the animal includes tree frog and cuttlefish DNA, allowing it to do such things. Outraged, Masrani orders Wu to shut down his operations, but Wu reminds him that the geneticists have always used the DNA of other animals to fill gaps in the dinosaurs' genomes. Wu further states that many of the dinosaurs would look "quite different" if their genetic codes were pure. Wu also says that the park exists because of him, stating further, "If I don't innovate, somebody else will". Wu is later revealed to have been secretly working with InGen Security head Hoskins to create the Indominus as a weapon. Hoskins has Wu flown from the island to an unknown location along with dinosaur embryos, thus protecting his research.

A viral marketing website for the fictional Masrani Global Corporation was launched to promote Jurassic World and provide backstory. According to the website, Dr. Wu continued his work on DNA after the events of Jurassic Park, and created the Wu Flower using the DNA of different plants. Simon Masrani subsequently took over InGen and promoted Wu.

==== Jurassic World: Fallen Kingdom ====
Wu is now working for Eli Mills and remains passionate about his genetic work. He has created another weaponized hybrid dinosaur, the Indoraptor, using a Velociraptor genome and combining it with the DNA of his earlier Indominus rex hybrid. It is also revealed that Wu personally designed Blue, a Velociraptor at Jurassic World. The Indoraptor is a prototype lacking obedience, and Wu needs Blue's DNA to create an improved version, with Blue also acting as a surrogate mother.

Later, Mills allows the Indoraptor to be auctioned at a black-market sale, despite Wu's protests that it is an early prototype. He argues that rival scientists will go on to make their own version of the animal. Later in the film, Franklin Webb drugs Wu to subdue him, and Wu is dragged away to safety by one of Mills's mercenaries.

==== Jurassic World Dominion ====
Wu is now under the employ of Biosyn. On behalf of CEO Lewis Dodgson, Wu has secretly engineered giant hybrid locusts using Cretaceous arthropod DNA to eliminate the crops of rival companies. However, the scheme spiraled out of control when the insects begin rapidly reproducing, threatening to lead investigators back to Biosyn. Wu now regrets his actions. At his suggestion, Biosyn kidnaps human clone Maisie Lockwood and Blue's baby, Beta, so he can study their altered DNA, believing this to be the solution to the locust outbreak. Wu explains that he was involved with Maisie's late mother, Charlotte Lockwood, from whom Maisie was cloned. Charlotte lived with the scientists on Isla Sorna during the 1980s, and later became a colleague of Wu, who has struggled to replicate her research on the alteration of DNA.

As Biosyn is evacuated due to a forest fire, Wu encounters numerous characters from previous films, including Grant, Sattler, and Malcolm. Wu begs to be rescued with the survivors despite their reluctance, but Maisie persuades them to let him join as she will voluntarily help him in his research. Later, Wu releases a modified locust that carries a pathogen he discovered while studying Maisie and Beta's DNA, successfully eradicating the locust outbreak and gaining redemption from his misdeeds. Wu is stated in a news report to have given credit for the discovery to Charlotte.

=== Other appearances ===
Wu appears in the animated miniseries Lego Jurassic World: Legend of Isla Nublar (2019), set prior to the events of Jurassic World. In the series, Wu carries out research to create hybrid dinosaurs.

Wu makes appearances in the first and third season of the animated television series Jurassic World Camp Cretaceous (2020–2022). Brooklynn and Sammy, two of the campers stranded on Isla Nublar following the Indominus rex incident, discover a secret lab where Wu had created another hybrid known as the Scorpios rex, one that was so dangerous that Wu was ordered to destroy it. However, he instead placed the Scorpios rex in cryogenic stasis where it had escaped from at the end of season two. Brooklynn and Sammy watch several video recordings by Wu on the creature, including one where it attacks him. He later comes to the island himself with the team that recovers the Indominus bone at the beginning of Fallen Kingdom. Wu searches for his laptop with data on the Scorpios rex and encounters the campers, who reveal that they have managed to kill the creature. The laptop is ultimately destroyed, but Wu is satisfied with the retrieval of the Indominus bone.

Wu appears in the fourth season of Jurassic World: Chaos Theory which takes place during the latter part of Dominion. Seeking to destroy Biosyn's assassin dinosaur program, the campers confront Wu who shocks them by expressing remorse for his actions and asking for their help to stop Dodgson. Wu explains that the program was intended to train dinosaurs for search and rescue, but Dodgson had twisted his work. Wu agrees to delete the data from the main servers and provides the campers with the location of a backup copy that must also be destroyed and his vehicle. Wu remains behind to continue searching for Maisie and Beta who he needs to stop the giant locusts. Following the events of Dominion, it's mentioned that Sammy and Yaz are working together with Wu and are close enough to call the scientist by his first name, something that Darius teases them about.

He also appears in Secrets of Dr. Wu, a downloadable content (DLC) pack released for the 2018 game Jurassic World Evolution. In it, players help Wu create various hybrid dinosaurs. Audio recordings of Wu are also heard in the 2020 game Jurassic World Aftermath.

Wu is also present at two theme park attractions, Jurassic World: The Ride and VelociCoaster, providing guests with information about the dinosaurs encountered during the rides.

== Production background ==
=== Jurassic Park film adaptation ===
For the 1993 film adaptation of Jurassic Park, Wu was portrayed by BD Wong, an Asian-American actor who had risen to prominence with a role in the Broadway play M. Butterfly. Wong was suggested for the role of Wu by Janet Hirshenson, the casting director for Jurassic Park. Director Steven Spielberg quickly agreed with the suggestion. Wong believes he got the role as a result of his work in M. Butterfly, which earned him several awards.

Wong auditioned for the role of Wu with scenes that were taken from the novel, but he was surprised to find out how small his part would be in the film adaptation. He believed that his diminished role was the result of "racial exclusion in Hollywood", suggesting that the filmmakers at that time did not want to "waste screen time on an Asian-American character". Wong said "it does happen a lot that they'll pick an ethnic character that's huge in a book or in some source material and either cut it, turn it into a white person, or whittle it down to nothing. And that's how I kind of felt about the original movie". According to Wong: "They didn't care about him, they don't even explain what happened to him at the end of the movie when everyone's evacuating the island! Clearly, he was not a priority for anyone. And I was very bitter about that for many years". He said that racial diversity and representation were uncommon at the time of the film's production.

Wong's role was shot in one or two days. He said he felt "left out" of the film adaptation and that "there was no real interest in that particular character as there was in the book". However, he did praise Spielberg for "making me feel important and introducing me to the crew in a way that made me feel like I was a real contributor to the movie, even though my part was tiny". One of Wong's friends, a fan of the series, later assured him that the filmmakers would revisit the character one day, though Wong was skeptical that this would ever happen.

=== Jurassic World series ===
For years, fans would ask Wong what happened to his character after the events of the first film. Eventually, he wanted to make some online videos to answer such questions: "Silly things for the fans, like he somehow ended up with the shaving cream can". (Note: In the Jurassic Park film adaptation, Nedry transports the stolen dinosaur embryos in a container disguised as a can of shaving cream, which is eventually lost on the island following his death.) Colin Trevorrow and Derek Connolly, the writers of Jurassic World, viewed Wu as a logical character to return, considering his role in recreating dinosaurs. Before Wong had a chance to upload any videos about his character's fate, he was contacted by Trevorrow about possibly reprising the role in Jurassic World, a year before it began production. Wong agreed, but was skeptical that he would actually wind up in the movie, due to the evolving nature of film projects. Wu's involvement in the script was finalized several months later, and Wong's expectations of the character were surpassed. He found the role to be more three-dimensional compared to the original film. The role was written by Trevorrow, who also directed the film.

Regarding his small role in Jurassic Park, Wong said: "The very thing that I bemoaned in the original movie is what made further exploration of the character possible. That couldn't have happened if they did say he didn’t get off the island, or if they did kill him, or if they did resolve it in a way that closed the door for him to reappear". Wong was the only actor from the original film to reprise his role in Jurassic World. He had played various doctors throughout his acting career and disliked having to wear lab coats, which he found stereotypical. He was particularly happy to wear a new lab coat in Jurassic World that is "a little more flattering and less industrial-looking" than the one worn in Jurassic Park.

Wong was disappointed that his character's death was cut from the novel's film adaptation. After the release of Jurassic World, he expressed interest in returning for the sequel, "Even if it's only to experience some cinematic version of the death Henry Wu experiences in the original Michael Crichton novel. That would be perfectly great to me to have a movie death like that on my reel. I would love that".

Wu's credentials were stripped following the events of Jurassic World, a detail that was removed from the final cut of Jurassic World: Fallen Kingdom. The end of Fallen Kingdom shows dinosaurs dispersed around the world, allowing other companies to reverse-engineer them. Co-writer Trevorrow felt it was far-fetched that Wu had been the only person who knew how to create a dinosaur "after 30 years of this technology existing" within the films' universe. Wong praised Trevorrow for attempting to "thread this character through and give him a journey that is interesting, dangerous and human in the little screen time he's given".

Speaking about Jurassic World Dominion, Wong said that Trevorrow was "very proud of where he's taken this particular character. He kind of rescued this character from obscurity". Dominion reunites Wong with several actors from the original 1993 film: Sam Neill (portraying Alan Grant), Laura Dern (Ellie Sattler), and Jeff Goldblum (Ian Malcolm). Wong and Goldblum have appeared in four Jurassic Park films, more than any other actor.

Aside from the film series, Wong also reprised his character through voice acting for Secrets of Dr. Wu and Jurassic World Aftermath. He also physically reprised the role for Jurassic World: The Ride and VelociCoaster. Vincent Tong and Greg Chun voice the character in Lego Jurassic World: Legend of Isla Nublar and Jurassic World Camp Cretaceous respectively.

== Characteristics ==
Trevorrow and Wong do not consider Wu a villain, an idea that the former found somewhat uninteresting. Wong said that Jurassic World "began this journey of three movies in which I was able to explore very different aspects of this character, and this strange unprecedented instance of me playing a character that I played in one movie and then, 23 years later, I resumed the character, and the character had gone through so many different things that he became almost a different person". He said the events of Jurassic Park changed Wu, stating that he starts out as an "idealistic, forward-thinking, very proud guy" who is "almost smug about what he’s done". As time goes on, he feels trapped by "the mechanism of commerciality and greed that surrounds him". Wong further believes that Wu is awestruck by the power of genetic engineering and oblivious to the motivations of other people who have recruited him to use such technology for "bad things", while stating that it was "the demands of the world that made those dinosaurs happen".

Wong does not view Wu as someone "playing God", but said that the character has an element of denial when it comes to the events caused by his actions. Regarding Wu's portrayal in Jurassic World, Wong described him as someone who is "delusional" and impressed by his scientific advances, to the point that "he's completely turning a blind eye to all of the bad things that are going on. [...] he doesn't really take it to heart to the point where he feels guilty about it at all". He did not view Wu as evil, but rather "extremely misguided or just in denial", describing him as "more of an accessory" to Hoskins.

According to Wong: "People love to say that he’s evil and terrible, and that hurts my heart. I find him rather noble and vulnerable and an unjustly vilified person because he started out as someone who cared so much. The dinosaurs were just a kind of stepping point to all the things that could be done with the technology for humanity. Then it went terribly wrong and just got worse and worse. It’s rather emotional for me, his whole journey". Despite the effects of his research, Wu still believes it can be useful for humanity.

Trevorrow said: "We don't really understand what he's reaching for, and yet he makes these choices that suggest that there is an endgame to it and that there’s something that will satisfy him. In the first two movies, we suggest that it's just recognition". Wong, likewise, said that Wu is eager to receive credit for his work, stating that he "doesn't always put the dinosaurs first" but "he really does respect them, and he takes great pride in his role in creating them". Trevorrow believed that Wu's best moment in Dominion is when he gives credit to Charlotte Lockwood: "For his whole career and especially in the book, he had been seeking credit for what he'd done and had felt so unappreciated. [...] And so for him to finally give credit to someone else, I found that to be the greatest sign of his evolution and his redemption".

In Camp Cretaceous Season 3, Dr. Henry Wu returns to Isla Nublar with a group of mercenaries to retrieve the Indominus rex bone. During this mission, he and his guards temporarily hold Brooklynn captive. Throughout this encounter, Brooklynn engages Wu in conversation, challenging his motives and ethics. Her words seem to provoke a moment of introspection in Wu, revealing a more complex and multifaceted character than the movies initially suggest.

This interaction hints at the beginning of Wu's eventual transformation, as he starts to question his actions and their consequences. Brooklynn's insights plant a seed of doubt and moral reflection in Wu, which may contribute to his change of heart depicted in Jurassic World: Dominion. This nuanced portrayal in Camp Cretaceous adds depth to Wu’s character, showcasing his capacity for growth and redemption beyond the role of the mere antagonist most people take him for.

In Jurassic World: Chaos Theory, which takes place during the events of Dominion, Wu's change of heart is fully seen when he asks Brooklynn and the rest of the Nublar Six for help in stopping Dodgson. Wu explains to Brooklynn that he had become a geneticist to help the world and justified everything that he did because Wu was unlocking new mysteries, but he now understands that some mysteries should stay locked up. Wu expresses horror at how Dodgson, like everyone else, had twisted his work, creating not just the giant locusts, but assassin dinosaurs. Rather than weaponizing dinosaurs, Wu's intentions had been benevolent before Dodgson corrupted it, seeking to create dinosaurs who could help in search and rescue.

== Reception ==
Reviewing Fallen Kingdom, Scott Mendelson of Forbes wrote that Wong "is once again a highlight". He stated that watching Wu "discuss his specific morality is as engrossing as any dinosaur chase". After the release of Fallen Kingdom, Michael Walsh of Nerdist called Wu "a compelling, complex, and important big bad whose story deserves a powerful resolution" in the sequel. He stated that no other character "has undergone as dramatic a transformation" as Wu: "He began as Jekyll and turned into Hyde, losing his soul as he was consumed by a dangerous god complex". Walsh also viewed Wu as "the Walter White of Jurassic Park" and concluded, "We've followed Jurassic Park's heroes for 25 years, it's time to follow its greatest villain".

Renaldo Matadeen, writing for Comic Book Resources, opined that Wu "has easily been the most sinister villain" in the film series, going from InGen's lead geneticist to "a monster playing god". Matadeen stated that Wu's redemption storyline in Dominion "might have lacked closure because it never confirmed what catalyzed his change of heart, but Wu still came out of the conflict a hero". Saim Cheeda of Screen Rant praised Wu's redemption but stated "there is the feeling that he changed all of a sudden between the second and third entries". Nick Bartlett of /Film felt that Wu had a "sketchy progression" throughout the Jurassic World trilogy and noted that he once again "disappears into the background" for much of Dominion, as in previous films. Bartlett believed it would have been better if Wu "paid for his ignorance and ambition with a heavy dose of poetic justice". Richard Trenholm of CNET praised Wu in Dominion and viewed him as "a tragic figure, tortured by his mistakes", writing further, "He's the closest thing to an actual human person, and carries the original film's themes of scientific folly and hubris on his shoulders. We don't see much of him, though".

== See also ==
- List of Jurassic Park characters
