= Jurassic World Aftermath =

2020 video game

- Developer: Coatsink Software
- Publishers: Coatsink Software; Oculus Studios (Quest)
- Series: Jurassic Park
- Platforms: Oculus Quest; Oculus Quest 2 Nintendo Switch; PlayStation 4 PlayStation 5
- Release: Quest headsets; December 17, 2020 (Part 1) September 30, 2021 (Part 2); Nintendo Switch; November 10, 2022; PlayStation VR PlayStation VR2; February 22, 2023
- Genre: Stealth
- Mode: Single-player

Jurassic World Aftermath is a 2020 virtual reality stealth game developed by Coatsink Software and published by Oculus Studios for the Oculus Quest and Oculus Quest 2. It is based on the Jurassic Park franchise. It takes place on the island of Isla Nublar, two years after the events of the 2015 film Jurassic World. For much of the game, the player is hunted by velociraptors while proceeding through a facility on the island.

Jurassic World Aftermath: Part 2, a continuation in the form of paid downloadable content (DLC), was released in 2021. A non-VR version for Nintendo Switch without involvement from Oculus, titled Jurassic World Aftermath Collection and containing both parts, was released by Coatsink the following year. A VR version of Jurassic World Aftermath Collection was released by Coatsink for the PlayStation 5 via PlayStation VR2 in 2023.

== Gameplay ==
Jurassic World Aftermath is a stealth game played from a first-person perspective. It takes place on Isla Nublar, two years after the events of Jurassic World, and prior to the events of Jurassic World: Fallen Kingdom. The player takes control of Sam, a silent security expert who is sent to the island to infiltrate its ruins and obtain information. Their plane crashes on the island after an encounter with a Pteranodon. The player is aided by an offscreen partner named Dr. Amelia "Mia" Everett, who is injured following the plane crash and stays behind. From her location, she provides the player with mission objectives and updates.

For much of the game, the player moves through the N.M.S. Genetics Centre, while being hunted by velociraptors, the primary enemies. The player must use stealth and distractions to avoid the raptors, who can be lured away with the use of an alarm or radio. Two other dinosaurs, Dilophosaurus and Tyrannosaurus, also briefly appear as enemies. The player cannot fight against any of the animals and must instead avoid them. Sound is emphasized in the game, as listening to the environment is often necessary to proceed with success. Running creates noise, which can attract the raptors, making slow movements necessary. Minigames and puzzle-solving also make up aspects of the gameplay. The island's facility has doors leading into five different areas, and a switch must be activated to access each area. The final two areas are absent from the game and are included in the DLC, titled Jurassic World Aftermath: Part 2. It includes new mini-games and dinosaur interactions, and concludes the storyline.

== Development and release ==
Jurassic World Aftermath was developed by Coatsink Software, based in the U.K. Coatsink conceived the game in 2019, after approaching Universal Pictures about developing a Jurassic World game. The game was revealed in September 2020, and was published by Oculus Studios on December 17 the same year.

The game is reminiscent of a scene in the first Jurassic Park film, in which characters use stealth to avoid raptors in a kitchen. Brian Gomez, an executive producer for Universal Games and Digital Platforms, said: "There were countless hours spent trying to balance the velociraptor because she was just so damn good. AI really [progressed] to the point where it was very few of us that could actually survive her. And I think we finally got to the point where, when you first start, you're probably going to die a lot. You're going to die a lot until you start learning her behavior and … reading her body language and audio cues".

The game uses cel-shaded animation, similar in appearance to a comic book. This was done in order to produce dinosaurs with a less-threatening appearance, in an effort to appeal to a wider audience. Gomez said: "We wanted it to still be scary and affecting and immersive, even if it wasn't filmic — like photo-realism. But we also didn't want it to be so intimidating and so scary … [for] a huge portion of the Jurassic audience that doesn't want a totally visceral R-rated horror experience". Jeff Goldblum and BD Wong recorded dialogue for the game, briefly reprising their roles as Dr. Ian Malcolm and Dr. Henry Wu. The characters are heard, but do not make a physical appearance. Laura Bailey provides the voice for Dr. Amelia "Mia" Everett.

Jurassic World Aftermath: Part 2, also developed by Coatsink, was released on September 30, 2021, as paid downloadable content. The game was originally meant as a single release, but the development team switched to remote work as the COVID-19 pandemic began, and this disrupted the team's schedule. Rather than delay the entire game, the team chose to split it into two parts and release the latter when it was ready. As a result, the storyline had to be rearranged significantly. The ending for the first half was initially a scene meant to occur at a different point in the game. The later release for Part 2 allowed the team to incorporate more features than originally planned. This included a second interactive encounter with a T. rex. Prior to the delay, there were only plans for a second T. rex appearance in the form of a cutscene. Goldblum and Bailey reprise their roles for the game's second part.

A Nintendo Switch port, titled Jurassic World Aftermath Collection and containing both parts, was released on November 10, 2022. The Switch version lacks virtual reality gameplay. Coatsink stated that the game was ported to a non-VR console "to allow people without access to VR, or who suffer from motion sickness from VR, to play too". A VR version of Jurassic World Aftermath Collection was released on February 22, 2023, as a launch title for the PlayStation VR2.

== Reception ==
Reception

Aggregate scores
Aggregator	Score
Metacritic	NS: 62/100; PSVR2: 64/100
OpenCritic	40% recommend

Review scores
Publication	Score
IGN	8/10
Nintendo Life	NS: 6/10
Play	PSVR2: 7/10
TouchArcade	NS: 3/5
Android Central	Part 1: 3.5/5; Part 2: 4/5
TheGamer	3/5
Multiplayer.it	PSVR2: 6.5/10
UploadVR	3/5

Jurassic World Aftermath received "mixed or average" reviews according to review aggregator Metacritic. Fellow review aggregator OpenCritic assessed that the game received weak approval, being recommended by 40% of critics. Critics stated that the game would appeal to fans of the Jurassic Park franchise. The graphics and sound were generally praised. Harry Baker of UploadVR wrote: "Despite not being photo realistic, there's something about the comic book-inspired look that almost helps immersion — instead of being hung up on how everything looks compared to reality, you're immediately immersed in a terrifying comic book world littered with dinosaurs". Eric Hillery of Bleeding Cool wrote that the graphics are "more than enough to make the idea of being eaten or jump-scared downright unpleasant, but without bringing the type of gore that some users might find traumatizing".

Ethan Anderton of /Film was critical of the cel-shaded animation, calling it his only major disappointment with the game. He concluded that while he would prefer "a little more variety in the puzzle gameplay as the story progresses and gets more challenging, it's the thrill of being hunted on the abandoned property of Jurassic World that makes this virtual reality experience a solid experience". Nicholas Sutrich of Android Central called it "the Jurassic game I've always wanted to play", praising the simplicity of the gameplay and story. However, he criticized the AI, stating that the raptors mostly behave like guards patrolling an area, rather than the intelligent animals depicted in the films.

Alex Perry of Mashable opined that the game's premise of sneaking past raptors was "irritating and tedious", and stated that the game "harkens back to an archaic era of stealth game design where detection means failure". Perry concluded that the kitchen scene in the first film "is a classic, to be sure, but it doesn't work as the basis for an entire video game. Only the most devoted Jurassic Park-heads should go anywhere near this game". Baker also found the gameplay to be repetitive. Eric Switzer of TheGamer praised the stealth gameplay and compared it to Alien: Isolation, while writing that Aftermath "engages your body better than any other non-workout VR game I've played".

Francesco Destri, writing for IGN Italia, praised the game for its tension and variety of gameplay. Benjamin Bullard of Syfy Wire stated that the game has an appropriate level of anxiety like the films, and wrote: "It's fun to feel that first 'gotcha' fright of being snuffed out by a clever raptor, though the brutal difficulty of escaping, once you've been spotted, means you'll be setting out from a previous checkpoint more than once". He concluded that the game is "half a day well spent…so long as you don't mind a good cliffhanger".

Hillery considered the game too short, at approximately three hours. Some reviewers criticized objects throughout the game that are not interactive. Others complained of the game's abrupt ending and the need to purchase DLC. Baker stated that the game felt "rushed, repetitive and oddly-paced" because of the ending, and wrote that "it does feel like this game was originally meant to release as one whole portion, not two".

Switzer praised the game's second part, calling it "so much more dynamic and engaging" and stating that the climax "makes the entire journey worth it". Baker enjoyed the game's final two hours, calling them "the best of the entire experience, Part 1 included", but he stated "everything leading up to that feels like a retread". He found Part 2 to be "laboriously repetitive" and was critical of the overall story. Sutrich praised the additions in Part 2, but found the gameplay linear. He was disappointed by the minimally interactive environments, but applauded the voice acting, calling Goldblum's performance "superb". Baker, however, was critical of his voice acting: "Given Goldblum is usually full of charisma, it's telling that his sections mostly fall flat here, just like Part 1".

Reviewing the Switch port, Lowell Bell of Nintendo Life praised the audio but found the gameplay repetitive. He concluded that Jurassic World Aftermath worked better as an immersive VR game, while calling the reworked Switch controls "a little clunky and dull" by comparison.
