= Ellie Sattler =

- Jurassic Park character
- Laura Dern as Ellie Sattler in Jurassic Park (1993)
- First appearance: Jurassic Park (novel; 1990)
- Last appearance: Jurassic World Evolution 2 (video game; 2022)
- Created by: Michael Crichton
- Adapted by: Steven Spielberg; David Koepp
- Portrayed by: Laura Dern
- Voiced by: Marcella Russo (Jurassic Park: Operation Genesis); Laura Dern (Jurassic World Evolution, Jurassic World Evolution 2); Abby Trott (Animaniacs)

In-universe information
- Occupation: Paleobotanist; Soil scientist (Dominion)
- Spouses: Mark (Jurassic Park III)
- Significant other: Dr. Alan Grant
- Children: Two, including Charlie

Dr. Ellie Sattler is a fictional character in the Jurassic Park franchise. She is introduced in Michael Crichton's 1990 novel Jurassic Park, which began the franchise. Steven Spielberg directed the 1993 film adaptation, casting Laura Dern as Sattler and giving the character a more substantial role compared to the novel. She is a paleobotanist in both the novel and its film adaptation. In the novel, she is a student of Dr. Alan Grant.

Dern briefly reprised the role in 2001's Jurassic Park III. In the film, Sattler and Grant have broken off their relationship but remain friends. She is married to Mark and has two children. Dern's character was initially absent from the film, but script rewrites during pre-production added a small role for her. Director Joe Johnston chose to break-up Grant and Sattler, believing that Dern looked too young to be in such a relationship; Sam Neill, who portrayed Grant, was 20 years older than Dern.

Dern and Neill returned again for major roles in Jurassic World Dominion, released in 2022. In the film, Sattler is divorced and now working as a soil scientist. She and Grant eventually rekindle their romantic relationship. Colin Trevorrow, the film's director and co-writer, was in agreement with Dern and Neill on reuniting their characters romantically. Trevorrow and co-writer Emily Carmichael also wanted Sattler to have a major part in the film, helping to drive its plot. Dern's interest in climate change was incorporated into the character, inspiring Sattler's occupation as a soil scientist.

Dern and Neill also reprised their roles for the video games Jurassic World Evolution and Jurassic World Evolution 2, lending their voices to downloadable content packs released in 2019 and 2022 respectively.

Dern named Sattler as her favorite role in 2019. The first film gave Dern international recognition, and is often ranked among her best performances, seen by some critics as a modern portrayal of an action heroine. Dern considers the character a feminist icon of the 1990s.

== Fictional background ==
=== Novels ===
In the first novel, Sattler is a paleobotanist and graduate student who is studying under paleontologist Dr. Alan Grant. John Hammond's investors demand that he bring experts to his island, Isla Nublar, to certify the safety of a new theme park he is building there called Jurassic Park. Grant and Sattler agree to Hammond's invitation to tour the park, in exchange for $50,000 of funding for the dig site. They are awestruck to learn that Hammond has cloned living dinosaurs.

Although Sattler is initially thrilled to see the park, she finds poisonous plants in public areas and near swimming pools, and is angered by how little attention the staff has given to reproducing prehistoric plant life. After a tour, the rest of the group returns to the Visitor Center while Sattler stays with veterinarian Dr. Harding, to take pictures of a sick Stegosaurus. The dinosaurs eventually escape, and after a Tyrannosaurus attack, Sattler helps Harding care for Dr. Ian Malcolm's injuries. During a Velociraptor assault on the Visitor Center, Sattler uses herself as bait to distract the pack of raptors trying to get into the lodge.

In the novel, it is stated that she plans to marry a Chicago doctor sometime the following year. She is briefly mentioned in Michael Crichton's sequel novel, The Lost World, in which she is now known as Ellie Sattler Reiman. It is stated that she married a physicist and gives guest lectures at his workplace, University of California, Berkeley, while raising two young children.

=== Films ===
==== Jurassic Park ====
The film adaptation of Jurassic Park generally uses the same story and characters as the novel, though with some differences. In particular, it depicts Sattler in a relationship with Grant, instead of being his graduate student. She wants to have children, but Grant is resistant to the idea of starting a family. Over the course of the film, he warms up to Hammond's grandchildren and protects them. Malcolm flirts with Sattler on several occasions, much to the complete annoyance of Grant.

==== Jurassic Park III ====
Ellie (Note: In Jurassic Park III, Ellie has married and her surname is not specified.) has a minor role in Jurassic Park III. She and Grant had ended their romantic relationship on good terms sometime after the first film, but they still remain close friends. She is now married to Mark, an employee of the U.S. State Department, and she is in the process of writing a book. They have two children, including a three-year-old boy, named Charlie and a baby. Grant has continued his Velociraptor research, which he discusses with Ellie while visiting her, which implies by their conversation that she is traumatized by her encounter with them at Jurassic Park. Later, Grant contacts Ellie for help after he and others become stranded on Isla Sorna.

==== Jurassic World Dominion ====
Ellie and Mark have divorced and their children are now in college. She enjoys her new-found freedom and now works as a soil scientist. She launches an investigation when giant locusts emerge and begin rapidly consuming crops, threatening the world's food supply. Ellie learns that the insects are bypassing crops which use Biosyn's seeds, leading her to suspect that the company has engineered the insects to boost its own profits.

Grant, who is now an older man, with no family, has continued his work in paleontology. He and Ellie have not seen each other for sometime. She visits him at his dig site in Utah and convinces him to accompany her to Biosyn's headquarters in Italy, to look for incriminating evidence. They receive help from Malcolm, who now works for the company as an in-house philosopher. While at Biosyn, Ellie and Grant meet Maisie Lockwood and her adoptive parents, Owen Grady and Claire Dearing. Ellie reveals that she was good friends with Maisie's mother, Charlotte, before her death. Biosyn is eventually brought down. Grant and Ellie rekindle their romantic relationship, and prepare to testify against Biosyn in Washington, D.C.

== Production background ==
=== Jurassic Park film adaptation ===
Unlike the novel, Sattler has a more prominent role in the 1993 film adaptation, as director Steven Spielberg felt she did not get enough attention in the book. Because of plot alterations in the film, Sattler does many of the things done by Donald Gennaro in the novel. In the film, it is Sattler who ventures out of the bunker with Robert Muldoon to bring the park's power systems online. Spielberg also made Sattler and Grant a romantic couple to add tension.

Actresses considered for the role included Robin Wright Penn, Gwyneth Paltrow, Helen Hunt, and Stacy Haiduk. Juliette Binoche had been considered as well, but was already attached to Three Colours: Blue (1993). Early on, producer Kathleen Kennedy was interested in casting Laura Dern as Sattler. According to Spielberg: "That was a tough choice. I never thought of Laura in the context of Jurassic Park because I saw her as kind of frail and always being pursued by circumstances and men. I never envisioned her as a tough gal, like Linda Hamilton or Sigourney Weaver. But, actually, she didn't need to be. She wasn't required to play that kind of character in the film. Ellie is more of a brain".

Spielberg was impressed with her roles in the films Smooth Talk (1985) and Rambling Rose (1991). Nicolas Cage, who was Dern's co-star in the film Wild at Heart (1990), urged her to accept the role as Sattler. Compared to her previous films, Jurassic Park was a departure for Dern, which prompted her to take the role. She said, "It isn't about me finding my emotional motivation for each scene. It's certainly not quite the kind of acting I've done in the past. Sure, my character is fleshed out some from the book, but it's still all in the context of a movie that deals with dinosaurs".

Dern said that she worked with the filmmakers to avoid portraying Sattler as an "oversexualised action heroine". This included her appearance, which consisted of basic shorts, "no-nonsense" boots, a lack of facial makeup, and an updo, making for a practical look rather than that of a pin-up model. Dern said, "Every decision seemed simple, but little decisions like making her wear eyeglasses in the scenes where she's working helped her feel more defined". She collaborated with Kennedy on the character's appearance, and worked with writer David Koepp to incorporate some instances of feminist dialogue:

- Early on, Malcolm jokes: "God creates dinosaurs. God destroys dinosaurs. God creates man. Man destroys God. Man creates dinosaurs". Sattler responds: "Dinosaurs eat man. Woman inherits the earth".
- Later, Hammond implies that because he is a man, he should be the one to venture out to a nearby maintenance shed to restore power to the park. Sattler rebukes him, saying "we can discuss sexism in survival situations when I get back".

After surviving a raptor attack in the maintenance shed, Sattler falls to the ground and breaks down in tears. This was suggested by Dern, who said, "I loved that. I love that it didn't need to be some larger than life anti-heroine in order to conquer the, like, sexy scientist trope. She's a human being, and she's real. And she's vulnerable".

=== Jurassic Park III ===
Unlike the first film, Jurassic Park III (2001) was directed by Joe Johnston, with Spielberg as executive producer instead. Alexander Payne and Jim Taylor were hired to rewrite the script prior to filming. Ellie was absent from the previous draft, so Payne and Taylor decided to write in a small part for Dern to reprise the character. The two had previously written Citizen Ruth (1996), which starred Dern, and she had also co-starred in Johnston's film October Sky (1999). Johnston did not wish to have Ellie travel to the island for a major role. He found such an idea hard to believe, especially considering that she was now married and had two children. Dern was hesitant to return only for a cameo, so Spielberg suggested that Ellie have an important role in saving the characters on the island. Dern was convinced after Spielberg told her that Payne and Taylor were working on the script. Her scenes were shot in a day.

In one early draft, the U.S. State Department would send a helicopter and Ellie to rescue the characters, with Ellie explaining that she arrived thanks to a good friend at the department. Ellie's role here would ultimately be replaced by the arrival of the U.S. Navy, which the filmmakers considered a more exciting ending. Although Ellie's husband Mark is stated to be an employee of the State Department, his involvement in rescuing the group is not specified.

Regarding the break-up of Grant and Sattler, actor Sam Neill said that his character was so "anti-child in the first film she needed someone else". Neill liked how the script handled their break-up, with the two remaining close friends. In an early draft, Alan and Ellie were a couple in the process of splitting up. However, Johnston said: "I didn't want to see them as a couple anymore. For one thing, I don't think they look like a couple. It would be uncomfortable to still see them together. And Laura Dern doesn't look like she's aged for the past fifteen years!"

=== Jurassic World series ===
In 2007, Dern was contacted by Spielberg, who wanted her to reprise the character for a major part in Jurassic Park IV. However, the project was delayed multiple times. It was eventually released in 2015 as Jurassic World, with no involvement from Dern. Colin Trevorrow, the film's director and co-writer, did not want to feature Sattler or other original characters without a compelling reason to involve them in the story.

Dern and Neill eventually reprised their roles for Return to Jurassic Park, a downloadable content (DLC) pack released in 2019 for the game Jurassic World Evolution. The two lent their voices, but had to record their lines separately due to scheduling conflicts.

Dern expressed an interest in eventually reprising her role for the film series, and confirmed in 2019 that she would do so for Jurassic World Dominion, along with Neill and Malcolm actor Jeff Goldblum. Dominion, released in 2022, marked the trio's first appearance together since the original Jurassic Park film. Trevorrow returned as director and co-writer, and the actors collaborated with him on their character portrayal. They were not interested in reprising their characters simply for a cameo, and Trevorrow shared their sentiment, placing them in major roles. Trevorrow considered the actors to be the ultimate authority on their characters.

Trevorrow and co-writer Emily Carmichael wanted Sattler to help lead the film's story. Goldblum and Neill had both starred in their own Jurassic Park sequel, and Trevorrow considered Dominion to be Dern's film among the trio. Trevorrow wanted to depict a global ecological crisis caused by genetic tampering, with Sattler being the first to become aware of the issue. He consulted with scientists to determine how to depict such a scenario, ultimately devising the locust storyline.

Dern said in 2019 that Sattler was her favorite role. She viewed Sattler as a feminist icon of the 1990s, saying there are "so many children, and particularly young women, who idolized and felt she was sort of one of their first feminist, badass action characters. I love the idea of seeing where she is now". Because of Sattler's fan influence, Dern and Trevorrow felt protective of the character as they determined where she would be at this point in her life. Dern found the film's environmental themes interesting, citing them as one of the reasons for signing on to the project. Her interest in climate change was incorporated into the character, inspiring Sattler's occupation as a soil scientist.

Trevorrow, Dern and Neill were in agreement on having Grant and Sattler reunite as a couple. There is a 20-year age difference between Dern and Neill, which goes unmentioned in the films. Dern, commenting on the age gap, said in 2022 that "it was only now, when we returned in a moment of cultural awareness about the patriarchy, that I was, like: 'Wow! We're not the same age?'"

Dern watched Jurassic Park again prior to filming Jurassic World Dominion. She did stunt work on the latter film, which included running. She described Dominion as more physically demanding than the original film, and considered her character a "modern, feminist female action hero". Dern also said, "She's not some sexy-scientist trope. I didn't wear makeup in this movie. She's real".

Neill said Dominion would be the last Jurassic Park film for Dern and himself. However, they did reprise their roles for the Dominion Biosyn Expansion, another DLC pack. It was produced for the game Jurassic World Evolution 2, and was released on June 14, 2022, shortly after the theatrical release of Dominion.

== Reception ==
Reviewing the first film, Adam Mars-Jones of The Independent wrote that Sattler is "conventionally devoted to Grant, but has odd fits of feminism when talking to anyone else". Peter Travers, writing for Rolling Stone, praised Dern for her performance. TV Guide wrote that the film's action elements "are not matched by its characters, acting, or dialogue. Neill and Dern fail to achieve the larger-than-life stylization needed to register amid the effects".

In his review of Jurassic World Dominion, Todd Gilchrist of The A.V. Club wrote that Dern "carries the same fire of thoughtful indignation that made Sattler so appealing and essential in the first film". Saim Cheeda of Screen Rant praised Sattler's newfound independence: "She went from holding herself back for Alan and her ex-husband to taking charge in exposing Biosyn's corruption". Zoe Jordan, also writing for Screen Rant, believed that the film "slowly undermines [Sattler's] established strengths", particularly in two scenes where she behaves squeamishly around the locusts. Jordan opined that Dominion "sadly devastates the legendary bravery of her character, especially because the second scene is played off as comic relief and unneeded". Nick Bartlett of /Film found Sattler's chemistry with Grant and Malcolm consistent with the first film, although he was disappointed that she "somewhat fades into the background as the film goes on".

Some fans were disappointed by Grant and Sattler's break-up in Jurassic Park III, viewing it as a mistake. David Crow, writing for Den of Geek, praised Dominion for reuniting the two romantically, while Gilchrist found this aspect to be clumsily handled. Bartlett called the reconciliation "a lovely moment for the two characters — even if it reeks of fan service".

== Analysis ==
In the first film, Sattler's primary outfit consists of khaki shorts and an open, pink-colored button shirt, tied at its bottom above the waist and worn over a blue tank top. Kyle Munzenrieder of W called the outfit "decidedly feminine without overtly catering to the male gaze", further writing: "It’s casual, yet conveys a sense of authority and intellect. In a way, the outfit helps communicate that Dern’s character is every bit the scientific and survival equal as the men".

In 2012, authors David Bordwell and Noël Carroll praised the film's depiction of Sattler, calling her courageous and well-educated. However, they did not view Jurassic Park as an "unmitigated feminist achievement", noting that Sattler's expertise "is never treated as especially deep or relevant". They found it surprising that Sattler is initially unaware of chaos theory, and wrote that Malcolm "explains it to her in the context of a teasing sex scene that treats her like a silly teenage bimbo". They argued that this depiction is enforced further by Sattler being "blonde, pretty, slender, and at least ten years younger" than Grant.

Author Lisa Yaszek wrote in 2013 that Sattler is initially portrayed in the film as "a bridge between masculine/ technological production and feminine/ biological reproduction", noting that she is the only female scientist and the only adult who "wants and values children" as much as her scientific work. Sattler eventually convinces Hammond that his park idea has failed, and Yaszek viewed this scene as Spielberg rejecting a full production/reproduction co-existence, instead "retreating to a more conservative vision of this relationship and reconfiguring Sattler herself solely as a traditional domestic subject".

== Legacy ==
Dern's role in the first film gave her international recognition, and it is often ranked among her best performances. The character's outfit has since become a popular Halloween costume choice. In 2020, a species of the prehistoric plant Brachyphyllum was named B. sattlerae, after Sattler.

Tom Chapman, writing for Screen Rant in 2017, considered Sattler a "perfect" female lead in the first film, though not quite on the same level as Ellen Ripley. He was disappointed by Dern's minor role in Jurassic Park III. In 2020, Keaton Bell of Vogue called her "easily the best character" in the franchise. He considered it "a damn shame she was brought back for the threequel only to be relegated to the sidelines of all the action", concluding, "The world’s foremost paleobotanist deserves so much better". Kayleigh Dray of Stylist praised the character's portrayal in the first film: "Ellie Sattler didn't just break all the moulds: she positively shattered them. She was able to be vulnerable and ballsy, tender and stern, all at once".

Dern's performance received renewed evaluation in 2022, as Dominion neared its release. Andrew McGrotty of MovieWeb ranked Jurassic Park among her best films, writing that she brought "life and nuance to the character, making her the fiercely intelligent and capable scientist that we remember". Michael Heiskell, also writing for MovieWeb, viewed Sattler's "fierce determination and positivity" as some of the film's best aspects. Author Lester D. Friedman called her "a powerful and aggressive heroine, a distinct advancement over most female figures in horror movies and within Spielberg's other productions". Thrillist called Sattler "one of the most well-rounded action heroines in modern cinema". Matthew Jacobs of Vulture.com offered particular praise for Dern's performance in the first film, and wrote that the character "has been memed, quoted, and Halloween-costumed to death".

== See also ==
- List of Jurassic Park characters
