= Chaos Island: The Lost World =

1997 video game

- Developer: DreamWorks Interactive
- Publisher: DreamWorks Interactive
- Producer: Denise Fulton
- Designer: Noah Falstein
- Programmer: Steven Herndon
- Artist: Nicholas deSomov
- Writers: Danny Hartigan; Tim Wade
- Composer: Michael Giacchino
- Series: Jurassic Park
- Platform: Windows
- Release: NA: October 30, 1997
- Genre: Real-time strategy
- Mode: Single-player

Chaos Island: The Lost World (also known as Chaos Island and Chaos Island: The Lost World: Jurassic Park) is a real-time strategy video game for the PC, developed and published by DreamWorks Interactive, and based on the 1997 film The Lost World: Jurassic Park. Chaos Island was released in North America on October 30, 1997. In Chaos Island, the player controls characters displayed on a map, directing where they move with the mouse and giving them commands either with the mouse or from a menu.

== Plot ==
The game features six characters from the film, each voiced by the actors who played them in the film: Dr. Ian Malcolm (Jeff Goldblum), Dr. Sarah Harding (Julianne Moore), Nick Van Owen (Vince Vaughn), Eddie Carr (Richard Schiff), Kelly Curtis (Vanessa Lee Chester), and John Hammond (Richard Attenborough). Early in the game, Malcolm, Van Owen and Carr are on Isla Nublar (the island where Jurassic Park occurred), where they rendezvous with Harding and obtain a DNA serum used to control dinosaurs that they hatch. A freighter then takes them to Isla Sorna (where The Lost World: Jurassic Park occurs) and crashes there in a storm.

Future missions are largely spent combating hunters, who are on the island to capture the dinosaurs and take them to a theme park. The hunters are hostile to the playable characters and will attack them on foot, using Jeeps, and tanks in later levels. In one mission, the characters must free a baby T. Rex and other captured dinosaurs from the hunters' camp, then in the next, return it to its nest and free the mother, who has been captured by the hunters.

Later in the game, the hunters blow up the playable characters' communications transmitter. The characters make their way to the InGen Communications Center (as in the film) to contact help. In the game's final level, the characters must all make their way to a helipad where they can be picked up. If these missions are completed, a bonus mission is opened where the player can play as the mother T. Rex in San Diego making her way to the freighter where her baby is, and combating hunters on the way.

== Gameplay ==
Only Malcolm, Van Owen, Carr and a "Research Assistant" are available from the start; Harding and Curtis become playable shortly into the game. The player can have more than one Research Assistant. Each of the characters has a different level of speed, eyesight (used for uncovering the fog of war) and number of supplies they can carry at one time. Each character can carry a gun that can be used against dinosaurs and hunters. Each character costs a certain number of points when selected for use in a level. There is a limited number of points that can be spent before the level begins, but when collecting supplies, the points can be spent on bringing in characters during the level. Hammond appears in cutscenes between levels.

The game includes three difficulty levels and 12 missions, except on the Easy level of difficulty, where the last two missions are left out. In each mission, the player is required to build a base camp, which can be used for gathering supplies and dinosaur eggs. Any character can build structures. They can then collect supplies which can be found on the map. Among the structures which can be built are shelters for healing characters (Shelters, and Hardened Shelters which heal faster), nests for hatching friendly dinosaurs (Artificial Nest, and Incubator where the egg hatches quicker), High Hides for protecting characters, and buildings where points can be used to upgrade character speed, eyesight, and defense.

The game's plot also requires the characters to breed and train a team of fighting dinosaurs that can be used against enemies. Eight dinosaurs from the films are featured, including Parasaurolophus, Compsognathus, Pachycephalosaurus, Dilophosaurus, Stegosaurus, Velociraptor, Triceratops and Tyrannosaurus. The game begins with just the first two, with stronger dinosaurs appearing in later missions. All wild dinosaurs (which wear white collars) are generally hostile to both the characters and hunters. However, the game features dinosaur nests with eggs, which can be collected by the characters and hatched, producing dinosaurs wearing blue collars which can be controlled by the player.

Herbivorous dinosaurs can replenish their health by eating plants, while carnivores do so by eating hunters or other dinosaurs. In the last three missions, the hunters become able to hatch dinosaurs of their own, which wear red collars and are hostile to the player. There are situations where wild dinosaurs can be lured or baited in to fighting hunters as they tend to attack nearby characters on either side; sometimes hunters also provoke them.

== Development ==
Noah Falstein was the lead designer for Chaos Island. Falstein considered Chaos Island to be a challenging concept, being a real-time strategy game aimed at young children between the ages of 8 and 12. Chaos Island was unveiled at the Electronic Entertainment Expo (E3) in June 1997.

With production running smoothly, the development team chose to begin adding a special final level to the game just a few months prior to its release. Falstein has noted that the game is somewhat-unknown, particularly because of an advance order of 200,000 copies of the game – intended for distribution in Europe – that was rejected by DreamWorks. The game engine used for Chaos Island was later updated and re-used for Small Soldiers Squad Commander, a real-time strategy game released in 1998.

== Reception ==
Cindy Yans of Computer Games Magazine rated the game three stars out of five and wrote that the game "has the look and feel of the original Command & Conquer," although she noted that the artificial intelligence was not perfect. Yans wrote that players with limited real-time strategy experience would enjoy the game's mini-missions. Yans noted that the film's actors provided their voices "in a limited number of annoyingly repetitive sound bytes during mission play… with some good humor [...]. In the inter-mission briefings, however, the actors' presence is much easier to swallow. It is a nice touch to hear Jeff Goldblum instruct us about the upcoming mission."

David Laprad of The Adrenaline Vault gave the game two stars out of five and was surprised that some of the film's actors were "associated with such a low-grade product," writing that the actors generally have "very few lines, even fewer of which are used effectively, so the voice acting adds nothing to the product except a blurb on the outside of the box intended to increase sales." Laprad said the game had an outdated look in comparison to other games released at that time, and criticized some characters for being animated so small that "it is impossible to determine exactly what it is they are doing at any point during gameplay." Laprad criticized the game's early levels for being "really nothing more than training missions that introduce players to the basic elements of gameplay" and wrote that "there simply isn't enough here to make the game worth playing." Laprad also criticized the seemingly "pointless" missions and the lack of a multiplayer mode, and wrote, "My main complaint is that the game is boring."

Laprad wrote that the game "makes a critical error [...] by not providing a hot key for assigning units or groups of units and calling them up on the fly; no respectable real-time strategy game makes this mistake." Laprad also criticized the game for "one very frustrating bug that can absolutely wreck a player's progress on a mission," in which team members that are not present at a save point will often be excluded from the level when it is reloaded. Laprad also criticized the game's "dated" sound effects for being "oddly out of sync," and said that they "rarely accurately convey the event they are intended to represent." Laprad also criticized the game's orchestral music. Although Laprad praised the game's control and responsive characters, he concluded that, "Chaos Island is remedial real-time strategy. There is very little depth to the undemanding and simplistic gameplay."

Entertainment Weekly rated it an "A−" and stated that it was not as confusing as other strategy games. Tahsin Shamma of Computer Gaming World praised the graphics and real-time gameplay, and stated that while it was "not as sophisticated" as other mission-based real-time games, "it's great fun for those who loved the movie." Richard Moore, writing for Australian newspaper The Age, called Chaos Island "a good game" for children, and stated, "The graphics are not great but it is fun and it requires that you use your head." On a five-star scale, Moore gave the game's graphics and sound two stars, while awarding the playability three stars.

== See also ==
- Jurassic Park video games
