= Alan Grant (Jurassic Park) =

- Jurassic Park character
- Sam Neill as Dr. Alan Grant in Jurassic Park (1993)
- First appearance: Jurassic Park (novel; 1990)
- Last appearance: Jurassic World Evolution 2 (video game; 2022)
- Created by: Michael Crichton
- Adapted by: Steven Spielberg; David Koepp
- Portrayed by: Sam Neill
- Voiced by: Brian Hannan (Jurassic Park: Operation Genesis); Sam Neill (Jurassic World Evolution, Jurassic World Evolution 2); Adrian Hough (Lego Jurassic World: Legend of Isla Nublar); Keith Ferguson (Animaniacs)

In-universe information
- Occupation: Paleontologist
- Significant other: Dr. Ellie Sattler

Dr. Alan Grant is a fictional character in the Jurassic Park franchise. He is a paleontologist and is introduced in Michael Crichton's 1990 novel Jurassic Park, which began the franchise. Crichton based Grant on the paleontologist Jack Horner, who was, by happenstance, technical advisor for the films. Director Steven Spielberg helmed the 1993 film adaptation, and several actors were considered for the role of Grant. It ultimately went to Sam Neill, becoming one of his most popular roles. Spielberg gave the character a dislike of children, and put him in a relationship with Dr. Ellie Sattler, a paleobotanist who is Grant's student in the novel. Sattler, portrayed by Laura Dern, wants to start a family with Grant, who is resistant to the idea.

Neill reprised the character in 2001's Jurassic Park III, which also saw a cameo by Dern. In the film, Sattler has married someone else and started a family, although she and Grant remain friends. Director Joe Johnston chose to break-up Grant and Sattler, believing that Dern looked too young to be in such a relationship; Neill is 20 years older than her. Neill was dissatisfied with his performance in the first film, which factored into his return for Jurassic Park III, marking the first time he reprised one of his roles.

Neill and Dern would return again for major roles in Jurassic World Dominion, released in 2022. In the film, Sattler has divorced her husband; she and Grant eventually rekindle their romantic relationship. Colin Trevorrow, the film's director and co-writer, was in agreement with Neill and Dern on reuniting their characters romantically.

Neill and Dern also reprised their roles for the video games Jurassic World Evolution and Jurassic World Evolution 2, lending their voices to downloadable content packs released in 2019 and 2022 respectively.

Neill once again reprised his role with Dern and Goldblum in an Xfinity commercial in February 2026. Neill died in July 2026, making the commercial his final performance as Grant.

== Fictional background ==
Dr. Alan Grant is a paleontologist who is dedicated to his research, which includes a focus on velociraptors. He believes that dinosaurs are closely related to birds, and also theorizes that the vision of a Tyrannosaurus is based on movement. Grant has written several books on dinosaurs, as referenced in the first novel. He has also written at least two in the film series. In Jurassic Park III, Eric Kirby opines that he liked Grant's first book better, as Grant liked dinosaurs when he wrote it, compared to the second written after his time at Jurassic Park. Grant has a dislike of computers, and is portrayed in the film series as easily irritated.

=== Novels ===
In the first novel, Grant is described as "a barrel-chested, bearded man of forty". He had a wife who died years prior to the events of the novel. He has a strong affinity for children, especially those interested in dinosaurs. He is one of the world's most renowned paleontologists, partly specializing in hadrosaur and other duck-billed dinosaurs such as Maiasaura. Dr. Ellie Sattler is a graduate student and paleobotanist who is studying under Grant.

Before the events of the novel, Grant was approached by Donald Gennaro, chief counsel for InGen, to provide information on the requirements for the care of infant dinosaurs, claiming it to be for a museum exhibit. Later, John Hammond's investors demand that he bring experts to his island, Isla Nublar, to certify the safety of a new theme park he is building there called Jurassic Park. Grant and Sattler agree to Hammond's invitation to tour the park, finding it difficult to turn down the request from a major financial donor. They are joined by Dr. Ian Malcolm, and are awestruck to learn that Hammond has cloned living dinosaurs.

When the creatures escape, Grant becomes stranded in the park with Hammond's grandchildren, Lex and Tim. Throughout a large portion of the book, Grant and the children explore the park trying to find their way back to the rest of the group.

Grant does not appear in Michael Crichton's sequel novel, The Lost World, but he is mentioned several times, including an instance stating that he is lecturing in Paris. (Note: Richard Levine tells Malcolm that he asked Grant at a conference in Peking (Beijing) about rumors that InGen was cloning dinosaurs. According to Levine, Grant said the rumors were "absurd".; Ed James mentions that Grant is on a leave of absence and lecturing in Paris about his theory that Tyrannosaurus was a scavenger.; Grant is mentioned a third time when Levine criticizes his theory that a Tyrannosaurus could not function in rainy climates.)

=== Films ===
==== Jurassic Park ====
The film adaptation of Jurassic Park generally uses the same story and characters as the novel, though with some differences. For example, Grant is given an introverted personality and a dislike of children. The film also depicts him in a relationship with Ellie Sattler, as opposed to her being his graduate student. She wants to have a child, but Grant is resistant to the idea of starting a family. However, over the course of the film, he warms up to Hammond's grandchildren and protects them. Malcolm flirts with Sattler on several occasions, to the annoyance of Grant.

==== Jurassic Park III ====
In Jurassic Park III, Grant and Sattler (Note: In Jurassic Park III, Sattler has married and her surname is not specified.) had ended their romantic relationship on good terms sometime after the first film, but they still remain close friends. Sattler has a minor role, and is now married to Mark, an employee of the U.S. State Department. They have two young children. In the years following the incident on Isla Nublar, Grant has continued his research on fossils, but he struggles to secure financing now that living dinosaurs are known to exist on InGen's Isla Sorna. He dismisses the notion that his research is moot, saying that InGen's creatures are just "genetically engineered theme park monsters" and not real dinosaurs. Grant has proposed new theories regarding raptor intelligence, which he discusses with Sattler while visiting her. He believes that raptors were incredibly smart and possessed advanced communication abilities. Despite this, since the Jurassic Park disaster, Grant has developed an intense fear against raptors.

Later in the film, Grant reluctantly agrees to provide an aerial tour of Isla Sorna for the Kirbys, an allegedly wealthy couple, who agree to fund his dig site in exchange. Grant and the Kirbys fly to Isla Sorna along with mercenaries and Grant's graduate student, Billy Brennan. Grant is amazed, when they reach the island, having forgotten what it is like to see living dinosaurs. But the plane crashes and the group become stranded on the island. Grant learns that the Kirbys are a divorced middle-class couple searching for their 12-year-old son, Eric, who went missing eight weeks earlier while parasailing near the island. The Kirbys brought Grant for his expertise, hoping it would come in handy during their search. Eric is later found, and he and Grant bond while navigating Isla Sorna. Grant also realizes that his theories about raptors are correct. He and the other survivors eventually find a satellite phone, which he uses to contact Sattler for help. They are later rescued by the U.S. Navy and U.S. Marine Corps.

==== Jurassic World Dominion ====
Grant, who is now an older man with no family, has continued his work in paleontology. His digs have not been receiving sufficient fundings, due to de-extinct dinosaurs spreading all over the world. (Note: After the events of Jurassic World: Fallen Kingdom (2018).) This forces Alan to turn them as tourist attractions to stay afloat and to promote the importance of paleontology is to learn what life was like before humans became dominant species. Ellie and Mark have separated, and their children are in college. Now working as a soil scientist, she launches an investigation when giant locusts emerge and begin rapidly consuming crops, threatening the world's food supply. Ellie learns that the insects are bypassing crops which use Biosyn's seeds, leading her to suspect that the company has engineered the insects to boost its own profits.

Grant and Ellie have not seen each other for some time. She visits him at his dig site in Utah and convinces him to accompany her to Biosyn's headquarters in Italy, to look for incriminating evidence. They receive help from Malcolm, who now works for the company as an in-house philosopher. While at Biosyn, Grant and Ellie meet Maisie Lockwood and her adoptive parents, Owen Grady and Claire Dearing. Biosyn is eventually brought down. Grant and Ellie rekindle their romantic relationship, and prepare to testify about Biosyn in Washington, D.C.

==== Jurassic World Rebirth ====
In Jurassic World Rebirth, it is mentioned that Grant mentored Henry Loomis (Jonathan Bailey) after the latter earned his PhD in paleontology as a postdoctoral researcher. In contrast with Grant, Loomis is open-minded about genetic power for pharmaceutical purposes despite it is putting him at risk of unemployment, and he won't let his own harrowing experience with the de-extinct dinosaurs deter his belief that their existences can benefit the world but he rather that the mutated ones destroyed because of them being more dangerous than the base-genome species. Like Grant, Loomis is also compassionate with people.

=== Other appearances ===
Grant is a playable character in several early Jurassic Park video games based on the first film, as well as the 1994 games Jurassic Park: Rampage Edition and Jurassic Park 2: The Chaos Continues, and the 2001 game Jurassic Park III: Island Attack. He also appears in the 2003 game Jurassic Park: Operation Genesis, as the paleontologist responsible for locating material to clone dinosaurs.

Grant also makes an appearance in the 2019 miniseries Lego Jurassic World: Legend of Isla Nublar, and in a 2020 episode of Animaniacs.

== Production background ==
Crichton based Grant on the paleontologist Jack Horner. Grant's scientific achievements, including the first description of maiasaurs, are actually those of Horner and Robert R. Makela. Grant has also been compared to paleontologist Philip J. Currie.

=== Jurassic Park film adaptation ===
For the 1993 film adaptation, Grant's introverted personality and dislike of children were implemented because director Steven Spielberg wanted to "provide a source of dramatic tension that did not exist in the novel". Screenwriter David Koepp stated that while the book was able to pull off having a lead character without a personal issue, the medium of film required the audience to have an emotional investment, so Grant's dislike of children was invented. Sam Neill was one of Spielberg's first choices to play the role, although he was busy filming Family Pictures. Richard Dreyfuss and Kurt Russell seemed like obvious choices to Spielberg – the former having worked with him on Jaws (1975) – although he considered them both too expensive. Tim Robbins and Harrison Ford received offers to play Grant. Ford had previously worked with Spielberg, portraying Indiana Jones in several films during the 1980s. Ford received a copy of the Jurassic Park script, but according to Spielberg, he "just said . . . at this point in his life and career, this wasn't his cup of tea". The role was also offered to William Hurt, but he declined it before reading the script, with Spielberg again saying that "it didn't sound like the kind of movie he would be interested in making at this time in his life".

Neill was ultimately cast in the role a few weeks prior to filming, with the start of production being adjusted to fit his schedule. Neill was hesitant about taking a lead role, and was surprised to have received the offer. Horner coached Neill on his acting performance. Neill, a resident of New Zealand, spent weeks trying to perfect an American accent. When filming began, Spielberg told him he could use his regular voice. However, after several days, Spielberg advised Neill to speak somewhere in between the two accents. The men crafted an offscreen backstory for the character; according to Neill, Spielberg had decided that Grant "didn't have to be American, that perhaps he was from Australia and had lived here a long time." Neill himself said that he envisioned Grant as "someone who had graduated from an American university and had stayed in America his entire career." In the film, Grant nearly faints after getting his first glimpse at a living dinosaur. This was done at the suggestion of Neill, who considered it a realistic response for someone who has devoted their research to dinosaurs.

Spielberg made Grant and Sattler a couple in order to add tension to the film. He also felt that Sattler did not get enough attention in the book. She is played in the film by Laura Dern. There is a 20-year age difference between her and Neill, which goes unmentioned in the film and its sequels. Neill said this was "a completely appropriate age difference for a leading man and lady" at the time. Of his character's reluctance to starting a family, Neill said: "It's not that Grant dislikes children particularly, it's just that he is too caught up in his professional life to have time or energy for them. They are kind of a foreign species to him, so they make him anxious."

=== Jurassic Park III ===
When Neill took the role as Grant, he signed on to appear in two potential sequels. Jurassic Park III, released in 2001, marked the first time that Neill had reprised one of his roles. Reviews had been critical of the characters in the first film, and Neill believed that his performance could have been better, saying, "I was so over-awed by Spielberg; I think I didn't quite look after my guy [Grant] as well as I might have". Neill reprised the role in order to get it "right this time", and to "fill in a few blanks", believing the character to be "a bit unresolved" after the first film. He said about his character: "I thought he'd be a little more gnarly than in the previous film. The model in the back of my head was Lee Marvin in [1967's] 'Point Blank,' a guy who'd been through the mill before". Neill was satisfied with his new performance, but found the role to be more physical than his previous films, as it included climbing, jumping, running, and swimming.

Jurassic Park III director Joe Johnston described Grant as a more cynical person, considering the character's experience in the first film. An early story idea, devised by executive producer Spielberg, had involved Grant living on one of InGen's islands. According to Johnston: "He'd snuck in, after not being allowed in to research the dinosaurs, and was living in a tree like Robinson Crusoe. But I couldn't imagine this guy wanting to get back on any island that had dinosaurs in it after the first movie". In a rejected draft, Grant is seeking donors to finance the construction of a raptor research station on Isla Sorna. Johnston also found this idea contrived.

Neill was saddened by the break-up of Grant and Sattler, but said that his character was so "anti-child in the first film she needed someone else". He liked how the script handled their break-up, with the two remaining close friends. In an early draft, Grant and Sattler were a couple in the process of splitting up. However, Johnston said: "I didn't want to see them as a couple anymore. For one thing, I don't think they look like a couple. It would be uncomfortable to still see them together. And Laura Dern doesn't look like she's aged for the past fifteen years!" Although Grant has a dislike of children, Neill noted that the character gets along well with the ones he encounters. Of the two Jurassic Park films that Neill had appeared in, his favorite scene was in the latter, when Grant bonds with Eric Kirby and talks about his dinosaur books.

=== Jurassic World series ===
Neill was open to reprising his role for Jurassic Park IV, and was expected to return at one point. However, the project was delayed multiple times, eventually releasing in 2015 as Jurassic World. Neill and Dern do not appear in the film, which introduces new cast members. Colin Trevorrow, the film's director and co-writer, did not want to feature Grant or other original characters without a compelling reason to involve them in the story. Following its release, Neill did not anticipate that he and Dern would return to the film series, given its new direction. He speculated in 2016 that Grant had either died, or had retired from paleontology to pursue accounting: "He's sick to death of dinosaurs and running. [...] How do you recover from all of that stuff? I don't think therapists are trained to deal with post-dino stuff. No. I don't think you get over it. Accountancy would be one way".

Neill and Dern eventually reprised their roles for Return to Jurassic Park, a downloadable content (DLC) pack released in 2019 for the game Jurassic World Evolution. The two lent their voices, but had to record their lines separately due to scheduling conflicts.

It was also announced in 2019 that Neill, Dern, and Malcolm actor Jeff Goldblum would return in Jurassic World Dominion, which released three years later. It marked the trio's first appearance together since the original Jurassic Park film. Trevorrow returned as director and co-writer, and the actors collaborated with him on their character portrayal. They were not interested in reprising their characters simply for a cameo, and Trevorrow shared their sentiment, placing them in major roles. Trevorrow considered the actors to be the ultimate authority on their characters. Neill said about Grant, "People don't change that much. And he's not one to change. He's as ordinary and grumpy as ever". Neill kept his boots from the first film, and compared Grant to a pair of old boots: "They've seen better days, but they're really comfortable, and there's no way you'll get rid of those".

Trevorrow, Dern and Neill were in agreement on having Grant and Sattler reunite as a couple. Neill explained that Grant's love for Sattler is what motivates him to get involved in the film's storyline: "He's missed her all these years, and the opportunity to spend time with Ellie Sattler…that's what really keeps Alan going. He's happy to be with her, even if it means finding yourself in great jeopardy from time to time". Neill described Grant as "a workman of few words", whereas Malcolm "never shuts up [...] and that always drives [Grant] crazy". However, he also considers Grant to be "quietly jealous of how cool Malcolm is", saying that whenever Malcolm is "anywhere near Ellie Sattler, he's not going to be a happy camper". Dern, commenting on the age gap between her and Neill, said in 2022 that "it was only now, when we returned in a moment of cultural awareness about the patriarchy, that I was, like: 'Wow! We're not the same age?'"

Dern watched Jurassic Park again prior to filming Jurassic World Dominion, though Neill had not seen it since the initial press tour in 1993. For Dominion, Neill planned to prepare for the role by getting into physical shape, as the film would include running. One scene in particular has the cast fleeing from an animatronic dinosaur. Neill, being the oldest cast member, questioned whether he could keep up with the others, though he ultimately prevailed. Neill did not view Grant as an action hero, instead calling him an ordinary person thrown into extraordinary situations throughout the film series. In Dominion, Grant has brief exchanges with Owen, who previously managed to train raptors. According to Neill, Grant has a mixed opinion of Owen, being partially critical of his work with raptors. He believes the two characters also have "quite a bit in common" because of their empathy with dinosaurs, while noting, "We didn't probably quite make enough of that. But I think it's an interesting dynamic".

Neill said Dominion would be the last Jurassic Park film for Dern and himself. However, they did reprise their roles for the Dominion Biosyn Expansion, another DLC pack. It was produced for the game Jurassic World Evolution 2, and was released on June 14, 2022, shortly after the theatrical release of Dominion.

== Reception ==
Reviewing the first film, Adam Mars-Jones of The Independent wrote that Grant's mistrust of technology is "the sort of quirk that a computer might come up with in a doomed attempt to give a flat character a glimmer of dimensionality". Kenneth Turan of the Los Angeles Times also criticized the film, writing that "the sole point of all the carnage appears to be to increase Dr. Grant's appreciation for young people, turning him from a gruff curmudgeon into someone who has the makings of a considerate parent". Peter Travers, writing for Rolling Stone, considered Neill a skilled actor but felt that he lacked the "star presence" needed to portray Grant. TV Guide wrote that the film's action elements "are not matched by its characters, acting, or dialogue. Neill and Dern fail to achieve the larger-than-life stylization needed to register amid the effects".

Anthony Quinn of The Independent called Jurassic Park III a "hack work carried out with precision and performed with a heart", stating that Neill's "anchoring presence is always reassuring". Derek Elley of Variety wrote that Grant in the third film "is largely reduced to looking worried and uttering apocalyptic warnings". Jeff Vice of Deseret News found that Neill "manages to make us care about his life-or-death battle, despite his part being underwritten". William Arnold of the Seattle Post-Intelligencer wrote that Neill "is something like a movie star, and he provides a sage, comfortable, sympathetic human focus to all the mayhem".

Mashable's Kristy Puchko, in her review of Jurassic World Dominion, wrote that Grant is treated "like a loser who never made a life for himself out of the excavation pits". Zoe Jordan of Screen Rant wrote that Dominion makes "the barest of efforts" to show character development in Grant. Matt Zoller Seitz of RogerEbert.com wrote that Neill "seems embarrassed to be onscreen, or at least confused as to what he's doing in the story", further stating that the film does not justify his involvement "other than that he's from the earlier movies and needed to be here for nostalgia-marketing reasons". Nick Bartlett of /Film found Grant to be more comedic compared to the previous films. Writing for Observer, Oliver Jones stated that Neill "spends much of this movie looking like a weekend warrior searching for the right aisle at Home Depot".

Some fans were disappointed by Grant and Sattler's break-up in Jurassic Park III, viewing it as a mistake. David Crow, writing for Den of Geek, praised Dominion for reuniting the two romantically, while Todd Gilchrist of The A.V. Club found this aspect to be clumsily handled. Bartlett called the reconciliation "a lovely moment for the two characters — even if it reeks of fan service".

The character is sometimes compared to Indiana Jones, in part because they wear similar fedoras. Tim Robey of The Daily Telegraph referred to Grant as "palaeontology's answer to Indiana Jones, but with a geekier hat", while Tom Chapman of Screen Rant wrote, "With his Harrison Ford-esque chiseled jaw, Neill forged Grant as his very own Indiana Jones, but with an added layer of sass".

== Legacy ==
Alan Grant became one of Neill's most popular roles. He said, "What has lodged Alan Grant into people's affections is his extreme reluctance to have anything to do with children. He always ends up having to look after one or even two sometimes, and he does a pretty decent job. People often say to me, 'I wish Alan Grant would rescue me right now.'"

In 2022, Shawn Van Horn of Collider ranked Jurassic Park as Neill's most famous role, writing that while Goldblum "threatens to steal the movie in every scene he appears in, it's Neill who is the focus and the solid footing who keeps the movie feeling real, despite its unbelievable plot". MovieWeb's Michael Heiskell ranked the original film as Neill's best performance, and wrote that Grant's bravery throughout the series "is what makes him such an interesting character and a fan favorite".

A shot in the first film shows Grant taking off his sunglasses, in astonishment at his first sight of a living dinosaur. To Neill's surprise, the shot has since become an Internet meme. Jurassic Park III includes a scene in which Grant dreams he is on an airplane with a raptor, which then speaks his name. Grant awakens to find it is Billy calling his name as their plane approaches Isla Sorna. The talking raptor scene has also become an Internet meme.

== See also ==
- List of Jurassic Park characters
