= Lego Jurassic World: The Secret Exhibit =

Animated Lego Jurassic World special

- Written by: David Shayne; Jeremy Adams
- Directed by: Andrew Duncan
- Starring: Britt McKillip; Ian Hanlin; Dhirendra; Alex Zahara; Vincent Tong; Adrian Petriw
- Music by: Steffan Andrews
- Countries of origin: United States; Canada
- Original language: English

Production
- Editors: Mitch Stookey; Andrew Harron
- Running time: 22 minutes
- Production companies: Atomic Cartoons; LEGO

Original release
- Network: NBC
- Release: November 29, 2018

Related
- Lego Jurassic World: Legend of Isla Nublar

Lego Jurassic World: The Secret Exhibit is a two-part animated television special that acts as a prequel to the 2015 film Jurassic World. Inspired by the Lego toyline, it was aired on NBC in the United States on November 29, 2018. It was later released on DVD in North America as a 43-minute film by Universal Pictures Home Entertainment on January 15, 2019.

The special was followed by the 13-episode miniseries Lego Jurassic World: Legend of Isla Nublar in 2019.

== Plot ==
Set in 2012, Simon Masrani is planning a secretive new exhibit at his Jurassic World dinosaur theme park on the island of Isla Nublar. Park worker Claire Dearing is responsible for ensuring that three dinosaurs – Baryonyx, Carnotaurus and Stygimoloch – are transported from Isla Sorna to Isla Nublar to become part of the new exhibit. If Claire does well, Simon will make her assistant manager of park operations. Animal behaviorist Owen Grady is hired to transport the dinosaurs to Isla Nublar, along with four Velociraptor eggs. Owen and his helicopter pilot face a thunderstorm while transporting the dinosaurs, but eventually reach Isla Nublar safely. Upon arrival, the eggs hatch and Vic Hoskins is intent on training the velociraptors to obey commands. Owen is disappointed to learn that his job is not over yet, as he still has to transport the three dinosaurs by truck to the other side of Isla Nublar. During the transportation, a boy hijacks a park tour vehicle and takes it for a joyride across the island. Owen, accompanied by his dog Red, follows the boy and stops him. Claire proceeds with transporting the dinosaurs on her own. Meanwhile, Simon wants his scientists, Dr. Henry Wu and Allison Miles, to create a new dinosaur attraction to increase park attendance. Eventually, he decides to have them bake dinosaur-themed cookies to accompany the opening of his new exhibit.

In the second half of the special, disgruntled park worker Danny Nedermeyer infiltrates the park's control room and secretly sabotages operations. Owen reunites with Claire and helps her transport the dinosaurs. At Owen's insistence, they take a shortcut, but their truck plummets down a hill and crashes, and the caged dinosaurs escape. In addition, Danny shuts down power to one of the dinosaur enclosures, allowing the park's Tyrannosaurus rex to escape. Owen manages to get the dinosaurs contained, and Vic is impressed with Owen's ability to control the animals. Owen agrees to Vic's job offer to train the four baby raptors. Simon's exhibit, consisting of a three-dinosaur carousel, opens to the public. Danny is revealed to be the nephew of Dennis Nedry as he secretly vows to continue his efforts to bring down Jurassic World.

== Cast ==
- Britt McKillip as Claire Dearing
- Ian Hanlin as Owen Grady
- Dhirendra as Simon Masrani
- Alex Zahara as Vic Hoskins
- Vincent Tong as Dr. Henry Wu, ACU Team Member, Boy, Captain
- Bethany Brown as Allison Miles, Mom
- Adrian Petriw as Danny Nedermeyer
- Sabrina Pitre as Park Vet

== Broadcast ==
In Canada, the special debuted on December 1, 2018, on Family Channel. It was also repeated on Syfy the same day in the United States with additional bloopers. In the United Kingdom, the special aired between December 6 and 7, 2018 on CITV. Nine Network aired it in Australia on December 10 and 17, 2018. TVNZ 2 ran it in New Zealand on December 22, 2018. In Singapore, it debuted on Channel 5's Okto block on May 4, 2019. Prior to the debut of Legend of Isla Nublar, Nickelodeon re-aired the special in the United States on August 17 and 24, 2019.

== Reception ==
In its premiere, the first part of the special drew 2.1 million viewers. The second fell to 1.4 million.

Writing for Common Sense Media, Emily Ashby questioned the pairing of the child friendly Lego brand with the more adult-skewing Jurassic World series. She praised the comedy, action and pacing of the specials, but also warned that its detailed animation might be an issue for parents concerned about marketing to children.

== See also ==
- Jurassic Park (franchise)
- Lego Jurassic World (theme)
- Lego Jurassic World: Legend of Isla Nublar
- Lego Jurassic World: Double Trouble
- Lego Jurassic World (video game)
- Lego Dimensions
- List of films featuring dinosaurs
- Dinosaurs in Jurassic Park
