= Jurassic Park (novel) =

1990 science fiction novel by Michael Crichton

- First edition cover
- Author: Michael Crichton
- Cover artist: Chip Kidd
- Language: English
- Genre: Science fiction
- Publisher: Alfred A. Knopf
- Publication date: October 1990
- Publication place: United States
- Media type: Print (hardcover and paperback)
- Pages: 399
- ISBN: 0-394-58816-9
- OCLC: 22511027
- Dewey Decimal: 813/.54 20
- LC Class: PS3553.R48 J87 1990
- Followed by: The Lost World

Jurassic Park is a 1990 science fiction novel written by Michael Crichton. It is a cautionary tale about genetic engineering that depicts the collapse of a zoological park featuring genetically recreated dinosaurs, illustrating chaos theory (Note: Chaos theory was a fashionable field in the 1990s) and its real-world implications. Crichton published a sequel, The Lost World, in 1995.

Jurassic Park was adapted into a 1993 film directed by Steven Spielberg. The film achieved critical and commercial success, becoming the highest-grossing film of all time at the time of its release and launching the Jurassic Park franchise.

== Plot ==
In 1989, a series of unusual animal attacks occur in Costa Rica, with evidence suggesting the involvement of Procompsognathus, an extinct dinosaur. Paleontologist Alan Grant and his colleague, paleobotanist Ellie Sattler, meet with an EPA official to discuss the incidents but are unexpectedly summoned by John Hammond, a billionaire and founder of the bioengineering company InGen. Hammond takes them to Isla Nublar, a remote island where he has established a biological preserve, for a weekend visit.

The preserve is a cover for the construction of "Jurassic Park", a theme park showcasing living dinosaurs recreated using ancient DNA found in the blood inside insects that were fossilized and preserved in amber. Gaps in the genetic code were filled in with reptilian, avian, or amphibian DNA. To control breeding, the park's specimens are raised as females with a genetic flaw that makes them lysine deficient and unable to survive outside captivity.

The recent attacks have made Hammond's investors skittish. Hammond requests that Grant and Sattler tour the park and endorse it. They are joined by mathematician and chaos theorist Ian Malcolm, and a lawyer representing the investors, Donald Gennaro, both of whom are pessimistic about the park. Hammond also invites his grandchildren, Tim and Alexis 'Lex' Murphy, to join the tour. The park staff comprise senior engineer John Arnold, biotechnologist Henry Wu, game warden Robert Muldoon, PR director Ed Regis, chief programmer Dennis Nedry, veterinarian Harding, and several laborers.

While touring the park, Grant finds a Velociraptor eggshell, seemingly proving Malcolm's assertion that the dinosaurs are breeding. Grant deduces that using frog DNA to fill gaps in the dinosaurs' genetic code resulted in an environment that was conducive to dichogamy; some of the female dinosaurs became males and established a breeding population. The park's automated tally system failed to account for the newborns, having been programmed to allow operators to input the expected number of dinosaurs.

Nedry, angered by Hammond refusing to pay him for months of overwork, commits corporate espionage for Lewis Dodgson, an employee of InGen's rival, Biosyn. Activating a backdoor he wrote into the park's software, he disables the security systems and steals frozen embryos for the park's dinosaur species. Attempting to rendezvous with Dodgson's agent, he becomes lost due to a tropical storm. Nedry's sabotage disables the electric fences around the park's enclosures. He is killed by a Dilophosaurus during his attempted escape.

The tour group discovers that dinosaurs have escaped the island by stowing away on supply boats. When the power is turned off, they are left stranded next to the Tyrannosaurus rex enclosure and a Tyrannosaurus rex attacks them. Grant rescues Tim and Lex, but Malcolm is severely injured and left behind, while Regis is eaten. Muldoon and Gennaro, searching for the tour group, find Malcolm and leave him in Harding's care.

Arnold tries rebooting the control room's systems and undoing Nedry's sabotage while repair crews patch up the park. However, the staff does not realize that the rebooting process has left the main generators turned off, leaving only the overtaxed auxiliary generator operational. It quickly breaks down, disabling the entire island's power. Velociraptors escape their enclosure and kill Arnold and Wu. Grant and the children make their way back to the island's control complex by rafting down a river, narrowly escaping multiple dinosaur attacks.

Grant and Tim restart the main generators and regain control of the park's systems. Warned by Grant that raptors are aboard, Gennaro contacts the island's departing supply ship and recalls it. Hammond, walking outdoors while contemplating InGen's future, is killed by a pack of Procompsognathus after falling down a hill and breaking his ankle. Grant, Sattler, Muldoon, and Gennaro search for the surviving raptors and discover a nest hidden in the park's waterworks.

Malcolm seemingly dies from his injuries. Everyone is evacuated by the Air Vigilance Service, which declares the dinosaurs hazardous and razes the island with napalm. The survivors are detained in a Costa Rican hotel. Weeks later, Grant is visited by Dr. Martin Gutierrez, an American doctor who lives in Costa Rica. Gutierrez informs Grant that an unknown pack of animals is migrating through the Costa Rican jungle, implying that the surviving dinosaurs have been reintroduced into Earth's ecosystem.

== Development ==
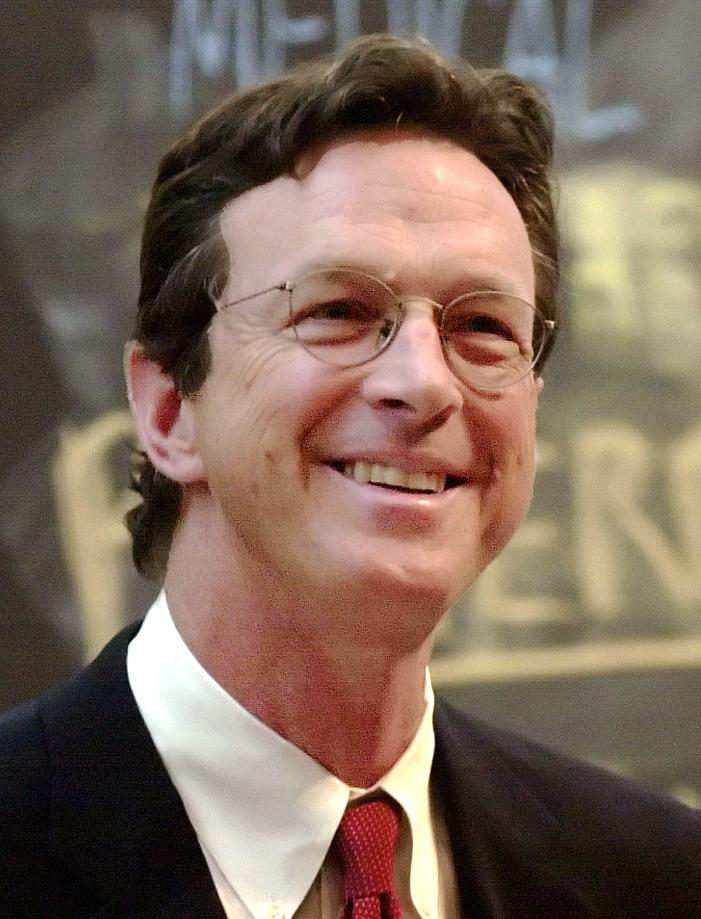
Jurassic Park was written by Michael Crichton, pictured in 2002

Crichton began working on the project in 1981, but soon set it aside because there "seemed to be an enormous mania about dinosaurs" at the time, and he was hesitant to "ride a current fashion". He eventually proceeded after concluding that the public's fascination with dinosaurs "was permanent." The novel began as a screenplay, completed by Crichton in 1983, about a graduate student who recreates a pterosaur. According to Crichton, "It was a very different story. It was about the person who did the cloning, operating alone and in secret. It just wasn't satisfactory." He said further, "I just waited to see if I could ever figure out how to make it work. It took quite a few years." He struggled, in part, to make the story believable from a scientific perspective.

Crichton revived the idea around 1988. Given his reasoning that genetic research is expensive and "there is no pressing need to create a dinosaur", Crichton concluded that it would emerge from a "desire to entertain", leading to a wildlife park of extinct animals. Crichton initially avoided the park idea, finding it too similar to his 1973 film Westworld. Once he accepted it, Crichton chose to proceed with the story as a novel rather than a screenplay, later explaining "it wasn't clear that anyone would ever make this story into a movie, because it would be very expensive." He sought to avoid certain ideas that had already been done in media, such as dinosaurs in a city, instead setting the story on a tropical island.

The novel was originally told from the perspective of Hammond's grandchildren, who are present at the park as the dinosaurs escape. Crichton had a handful of people whom he relied upon to give opinions on his early drafts; the group unanimously "hated" his first draft of Jurassic Park but could not pinpoint why. Crichton wrote two more drafts, which also failed to impress the group. One of the readers then realized that the story would function better if it were told from an adult point of view. Crichton followed this advice and eventually won over the group. He also added "a tremendous amount of material" on chaos theory that would come from Malcolm, who had been only a minor character up to that point in development.

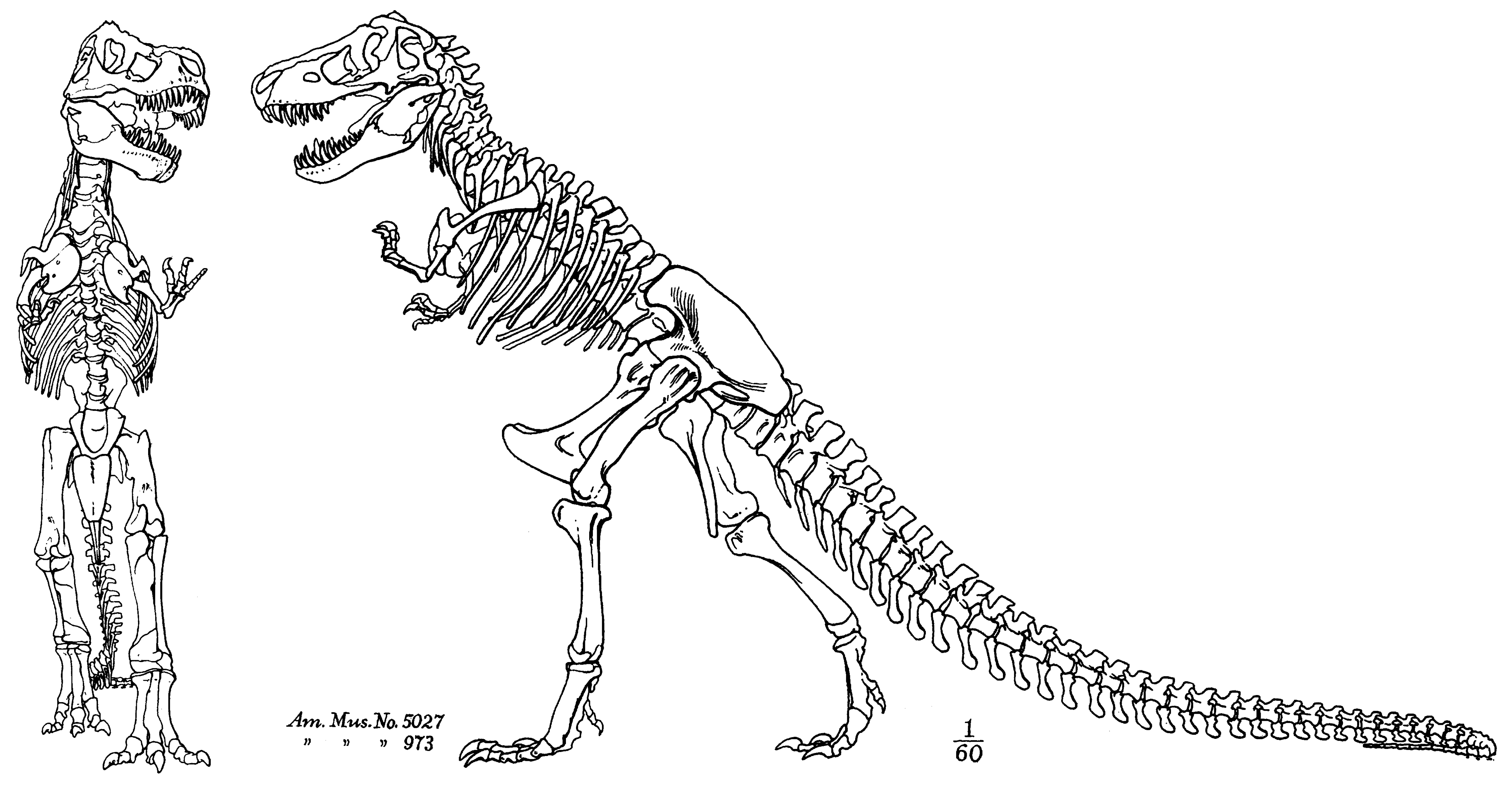
1917 skeletal diagram of Tyrannosaurus published by Henry Fairfield Osborn, which was the basis of the novel's cover.

In May 1990, Crichton submitted his manuscript to publisher Alfred A. Knopf. Chip Kidd, then a junior designer at Knopf, was told to create a cover that would suggest live dinosaurs without actually featuring a flesh and blood animal in it. After going by unsuccessful ideas like shadows, footprints, and close-ups of dinosaur skin, Kidd eventually sought inspiration visiting the dinosaur exhibit of the American Museum of Natural History. He concluded that "You’ve got all different kinds of animals represented, but the T. rex sort of commands the room." He made a sketch of its skeleton and bought a textbook on dinosaurs at the gift shop, where he found an illustration of the Tyrannosaurus by Henry Fairfield Osborn that served as the basis for the final product. Kidd noted that his option for the silhouette of a skeleton "brings to mind somewhere in between the remains of the animal and the animal itself." That concept saw approval along with the suggestion that it would be a wraparound image that extended to the spine and back cover, to "get a sense that it’s big, that it can’t be contained on one surface. It has to be free to roam around the entire jacket. Not just the front." The font aimed to be as utilitarian as the signage in an actual amusement park.

Jurassic Park was released in October 1990. For the novel's 30th anniversary, the Folio Society published a special edition in 2020, featuring six illustrations based on scenes in the book.

== Themes ==
Jurassic Park critiques the dystopian potentialities of modern science. Ian Malcolm is the conscience that reminds John Hammond of the immoral and unnatural path that has been taken. The final condition of the park is epitomized by the word "hell" which highlights the sacrilegious nature of Hammond's attempt.

The plot of Crichton's novel has similarities to Mary Shelley's 1818 novel Frankenstein; or, The Modern Prometheus, where humanity creates something without truly knowing anything about it. Henry Wu is unable to name the things that he creates, which alludes to Victor Frankenstein not knowing what to call his flawed imitation of God's creation. The immorality of these actions lead to human destruction, echoing the creature's vengeance on his creator.

As Dale Speirs notes at p. 18 of "Vanished Worlds: Part 6" in Opuntia 483 (Sept. 2020), Jurassic Park resembles Katharine Metcalf Roof's November 1930 Weird Tales story "A Million Years After", about dinosaurs hatching from millions-of-years-old eggs.

Similar to how his other novels represent science and technology as both hazardous and life-changing, Crichton's novel highlights the hypocrisy and superiority complex of the scientific community that inspired John Hammond to re-create dinosaurs and treat them as commodities, which only lead to eventual catastrophe. Crichton uses the opening of the book to highlight the shift of scientific research from occurring in universities for the betterment of all mankind, to private labs where research is conducted "...in secret...in haste, and for-profit". The similar fears of atomic power from the Cold War are adapted by Crichton onto the anxieties evoked by genetic manipulation.

== Reception ==
The book became a bestseller and Crichton's signature novel, with largely favorable reviews by critics. In a review for The New York Times, Christopher Lehmann-Haupt described it as "a superior specimen of the [Frankenstein] myth" and "easily the best of Mr. Crichton's novels to date". Writing for Entertainment Weekly, Gene Lyons held that the book was "hard to beat for sheer intellectual entertainment" largely because it was "[f]illed with diverting, up-to-date information in easily digestible form". Both Lyons' Entertainment Weekly piece and Andrew Ferguson's review in the Los Angeles Times, however, criticized Crichton's characterization as heavy-handed and his characters as clichéd. Ferguson further complained about Ian Malcolm's "dime-store philosophizing" and predicted that the film adaptation of the book would be "undoubtedly trashy". He conceded that the book's "only real virtue" was "its genuinely interesting discussions of dinosaurs, DNA research, paleontology and chaos theory".

Jurassic Park had sold nine million copies as of 1993. Three years later, it was awarded the Secondary BILBY Award.

Sean Guynes, writing for Tor.com in 2022, felt that Jurassic Park overlooked the dinosaurs as mere plot devices, and was critical of the prose and character development. He simultaneously praised the book for posing questions about the impact of scientific advancements on society, calling it Crichton's "smartest novel" for this reason. He wrote that Jurassic Park "was a bestseller, but it was never acclaimed and isn't remembered with much fondness. It was, for all intents and purposes, a mediocre thriller novel. But it asked big questions and it started something even bigger—a franchise". He went on to call the novel "an important look at scientific ethics and possibility that deserves to be reconsidered as a masterpiece" of the science fiction genre.

== Film adaptation ==
The novel eventually led to the Jurassic Park franchise, starting with a 1993 film adaptation directed by Steven Spielberg. It was distributed by Universal Pictures, which acquired the film rights to the novel in 1990. Crichton performed early work on the film's screenplay, with David Koepp eventually taking over.

The film adaptation excised much of the scientific dialogue, with Crichton saying, "I feel very strongly that books should be the best books they can be, and you should not worry about what the movie will do. In movies, a little bit of that kind of dialogue goes a long way. A movie like Jurassic Park is not the format to have extended discussions on the scientific paradigm." Crichton had also included explicit violence in his novel, including evisceration, believing that it worked well to immerse the reader by establishing the dinosaurs as serious threats. However, he considered film to be a poor format for such violence, believing that it distracts audiences and breaks viewer immersion.

The film was a critical and commercial success, leading to a sequel novel by Crichton, titled The Lost World and published in 1995. Spielberg returned to direct the 1997 film adaptation, titled The Lost World: Jurassic Park. No further novels were written by Crichton, although the film series would continue, with Spielberg involved as executive producer. Jurassic Park III was released in 2001, and the Jurassic World series began in 2015. Although not based directly on the novels, these films do include elements from the novel that were unused in the first film.

== Learner-oriented adaptation ==
In 1995 an authorised shorter version of the novel was rewritten by F. H. Cornish and illustrated by Donald Harley. Intended to learners of English as foreign language, it had been published by Macmillan Publishers for their "Macmillan Readers" collection of books under the imprint "Macmillan Heinemann ELT" (ELT standing for "English Language Teaching"). Out of the array of six levels of English established for the books in this collection, that version of Jurassic Park is rated "Intermediate".

== Jurassic Park: The Junior Novelization ==
Jurassic Park: The Junior Novelization was written by Gail Herman, Michael Crichton and David Koepp and published by Grosset & Dunlap in 1993. Contrary to the learner-oriented adaptation published by Macmillan Publishers two years later, this Grosset & Dunlap novelization is directly based on the 1993 film rather than on the original novel.

== See also ==
- John W. Campbell's 1938 story Who Goes There?, about an alien monster in the Arctic thawed out and revived after 20 million years
- The Cursed Earth, a Judge Dredd storyline by Pat Mills in 2000 AD from 1978 that introduces the idea of a dinosaur theme park, with dinosaurs cloned from DNA
- Carnosaur, a 1984 novel with similar themes
- Dragon Teeth, a prequel which Crichton had written in 1974 which was found in the late author's archives and published posthumously in 2017, set in the American West during the Bone Wars

== Bibliography ==
- DeSalle, Rob & Lindley, David (1997). The Science of Jurassic Park and The Lost World. Or How to Build a Dinosaur. New York: BasicBooks. ISBN 0-465-07379-4.

Awards
Preceded by Looking for Alibrandi	Books I Love Best Yearly: Older Readers Award; 1996	Succeeded by The Hobbit
