= John Hammond (Jurassic Park) =

Character from Jurassic Park

- Jurassic Park character
- Richard Attenborough as John Hammond
- First appearance: Jurassic Park (book; 1990)
- First game: Tresspasser (1998)
- Last appearance: Jurassic World Evolution 2 (video game; 2021)
- Created by: Michael Crichton
- Adapted by: Steven Spielberg; David Koepp
- Portrayed by: Richard Attenborough
- Voiced by: Richard Attenborough ("Tresspasser"); Bud Tingwell (Jurassic Park: Operation Genesis); Mackenzie Gray (Jurassic World Evolution, Jurassic World Evolution 2)

In-universe information
- Full name: John Alfred Hammond (Movies & Novel); John Parker Hammond (Tresspasser)
- Occupation: Former CEO of InGen; Creator of Jurassic Park
- Children: Tim Murphy (grandson); Lex Murphy (granddaughter)
- Relatives: Peter Ludlow (nephew: deceased)
- Nationality: Scottish

Dr. John Alfred Hammond (/ˈhæmənd/ HAM-ənd) is a fictional character in the Jurassic Park franchise. He is introduced in Michael Crichton's 1990 novel Jurassic Park, which began the franchise. Steven Spielberg directed the 1993 film adaptation of the same name, casting Richard Attenborough as Hammond.

Hammond is the founder of InGen and the owner of Jurassic Park, a theme park of cloned dinosaurs created by his company. The novel presents him with antagonistic characteristics, which were scaled back by Spielberg for the film adaptation. Although Hammond is killed by dinosaurs in the first novel, the character survives in the film version and briefly returns in the 1997 sequel, The Lost World: Jurassic Park, with Attenborough reprising the role. In the film series, Hammond dies off-screen sometime after the events of the sequel.

== Fictional background ==
=== Novels ===
Hammond is the primary antagonist in the novel Jurassic Park (1990). He is portrayed as a cold, sociopathic, and eccentric CEO whose desire to re-create dinosaurs stems solely from a desire to make a profit for InGen and shore up his legacy. To demonstrate the capabilities of genetic engineering, Hammond showcases a miniature elephant to potential investors, ultimately raising nearly $1 billion for the Jurassic Park project on Isla Nublar. Although some bioengineering companies strive to cure disease and illness, Hammond views such endeavors as financially risky and bogged down by government regulations, telling his chief geneticist Dr. Henry Wu: "That's a terrible idea. A very poor use of new technology... helping mankind [is] a very risky business. Personally, I would never help mankind".

Hammond takes little responsibility for the park or its failures and instead blames others for anything that goes wrong. He concludes that the people he selected as the park's senior staff have character flaws that prevent his vision from being realized. Through much of the novel, he remains in the relative safety of the Visitor Center and his private bungalow, continuing to believe that he is in control, even as the surrounding situation grows exceedingly dire. When his grandchildren become lost in the park, he maintains his belief that order will soon be restored and that the children are in no real danger. Near the end of the novel, it is revealed that he has no real love for his grandchildren nor does he care about the fate of his workers. When the staff regains control of the park, he rationalizes the disaster in the unemphatic, detached manner of a corporate systems analyst, deciding that everything that has happened was merely a fluke and even convincing himself that he should rebuild the park. However, while taking a walk outside, he is startled by a Tyrannosaurus roar (which in truth was a dinosaur recorder being used ironically by his own grandchildren), falls down a hill, and breaks his ankle. He is unable to climb up the hill and is subsequently killed by a pack of Procompsognathus.

In the sequel novel The Lost World (1995), Ian Malcolm briefly reveals the true secrets behind the InGen Incident, reviewing Hammond's investment strategies and rise to monetary power. He describes why the park failed and why Isla Sorna existed. According to Ed James, who is investigating the original park incident, Hammond merely died on Isla Nublar while on a business trip.

=== Jurassic Park film trilogy ===
In the film adaptation of Jurassic Park (1993), Hammond's personality is a near opposite to the novel's version, sharing only his eccentricity. Hammond is depicted as a kind, jovial and charismatic Scottish capitalist who takes responsibility for his actions, a sympathetic and loving grandfather and leader who means well and tries to keep everyone safe. Despite valuing money, he appears less interested in profit than his novel counterpart and explicitly states that he does not want to create a park that caters to the extremely rich, instead concerned with sparking interest in others. The film's Donald Gennaro possesses the majority of the negative and greedy aspects of the novel's Hammond.

Hammond has a deeper emotional understanding of creating attractions for children and families, and wants to make Jurassic Park a scientific reality. He notes that his first attraction was a motorized flea circus, but for the park he wants to show visitors something real rather than an illusion. Hammond has a catchphrase that is used throughout the film, stating repeatedly that he "spared no expense" with Jurassic Park, despite repeated evidence to the contrary that bordered on criminal negligence. He is misguided in his steadfast belief that his creations are under control, as he underestimates the power of genetics and nature. He also has little regard for pure scientific research, being more interested in the applications of genetic engineering. When the security system breaks down, he and his staff work to restore power and rescue the experts and his grandchildren while they remain in a secure control room. Eventually, he and the other survivors ruefully leave the island, with a depressed Hammond agreeing that the park has failed.

In the second film, The Lost World: Jurassic Park (1997), Hammond is older and appears to be in failing health. After an accident on InGen's other island, Isla Sorna, the board of directors relieves Hammond as CEO and gives the position to his nephew Peter Ludlow. The film states that Hammond had initially begun construction of Jurassic Park: San Diego, before abandoning the project in favor of the Isla Nublar location. Ludlow, who is also depicted to embody the negative traits of the novel Hammond, intends to finish the San Diego location and populate it with dinosaurs that he plans to take off of Isla Sorna. Hammond devotes what resources he has left to keeping the island's dinosaurs isolated from the rest of the world, something he has been doing in the four years since the Isla Nublar incident. He sends a small team to Isla Sorna to document the animals, so that he can garner enough public opinion to preserve them and the island. Hammond is ultimately successful, with Isla Sorna being declared a nature preserve.

In Jurassic Park III (2001), Hammond is only mentioned during Grant's lecture on Velociraptors: "What John Hammond and InGen did at Jurassic Park is create genetically-engineered theme park monsters".

=== Jurassic World film trilogy ===
According to a promotional website for the film Jurassic World (2015), Hammond died in 1997, following the events of the second film. InGen was purchased a year later by his friend Simon Masrani, CEO of the Masrani Global Corporation. The company proceeded with Hammond's original idea, eventually opening a new dinosaur theme park, Jurassic World, on Isla Nublar in 2005.

In the film, Masrani tells park manager Claire Dearing that Hammond entrusted him with his dying wish. Later, when Claire tells Masrani that the park has the best structural engineers, Masrani sarcastically states "so did Hammond." When Masrani berates Henry Wu for the creation of the Indominus rex and tells him to shut down all activity, he mentions that Hammond will not be there to protect him this time.

In Jurassic World: Fallen Kingdom (2018), Hammond is revealed to have been partners with Benjamin Lockwood in the de-extinction of the dinosaurs, until they had a falling out related to Lockwood's support for human cloning. Lockwood's employee and eventual murderer, Eli Mills, reveals that the two partners were driven apart when Lockwood cloned his deceased daughter Charlotte, the clone now being raised as his granddaughter under the name Maisie Lockwood. The film's co-writer, Colin Trevorrow, clarified that Hammond and Lockwood parted ways because of the latter's intentions to clone his daughter, acknowledging that he did so years after Hammond died. In Jurassic World Dominion (2022), it is revealed that Charlotte actually cloned herself, with Benjamin covering for her with a made-up story.

In Jurassic World, a statue of Hammond is featured in the park's visitor center. A painting of him also appears in Fallen Kingdom.

== Production background ==
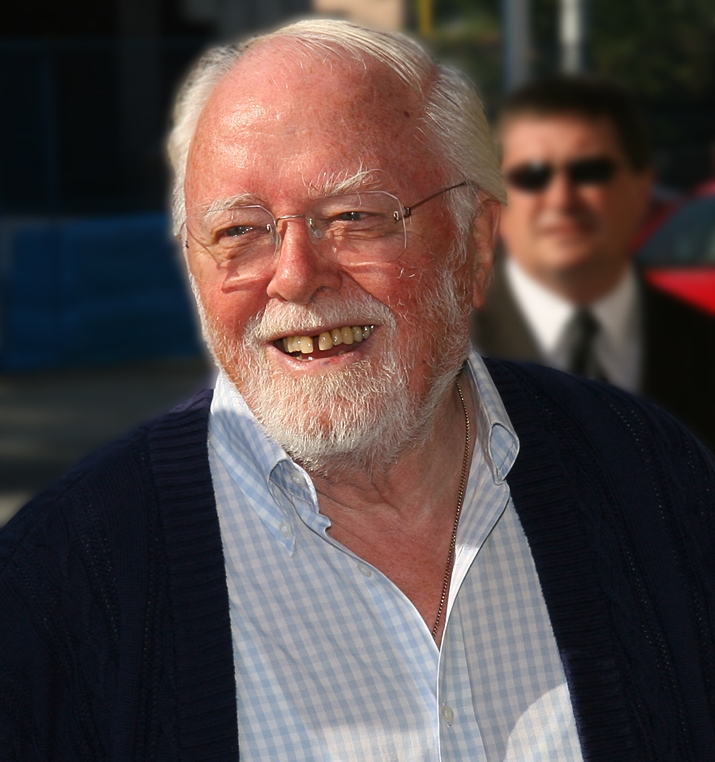
Spielberg enlisted fellow director Richard Attenborough to portray John Hammond.

Hammond's antagonistic traits in the novel were removed in the film adaptation. Although he is not modeled after anyone in particular, Crichton explained that Hammond is like the "dark side of Walt Disney". Director Steven Spielberg said about the novel: "I felt Hammond was a brilliantly written, but patented villain, and I was much more interested in portraying Hammond as a cross between Walt Disney and Ross Perot".

Spielberg had previously wanted to cast Richard Attenborough in two prior film projects, although these did not pan out. Attenborough was initially hesitant when asked to play Hammond, as he had not acted in 14 years and found film directing much easier. He eventually accepted the part after Spielberg pleaded for him to do so, stating "I can't see anyone else playing it but you". Attenborough immediately regretted accepting the role, citing the large amount of dialogue to remember. Upon arriving in Hawaii for filming, Attenborough was disappointed to find that production was ahead of schedule, giving him little time to prepare. He later wished that some of his scenes could have been redone, but also happily acknowledged that it would likely become his best-known role: "Probably in that one movie, more people have seen what I've done than in all the other films put together." Hammond uses a cane made of pieces designed to resemble dinosaur bones. It is topped off with a chunk of amber, which includes a mosquito trapped within it, referencing the franchise's general premise. The film prop sold in 2018, for $32,000.

Early drafts of the first film had Hammond being killed off by dinosaurs, including Procompsognathus in one version, similar to his death in the novel. Early storyboards for another draft depicted Hammond, alone in the park's control room, being killed by a Velociraptor. A later draft featured him staying behind on the island with his dinosaurs. Hammond's death in the novel by Procompsognathus was later adapted for the character Dieter Stark in The Lost World: Jurassic Park.

In 2000, before the release of Jurassic Park III, it was reported that Attenborough would reprise his role for a cameo appearance, but this did not occur, and Hammond is only mentioned in the film. Attenborough was not upset by his character's absence in the third film, while saying: "Did I die in the last one? I don't know, I looked pretty decrepit. I've never seen it. I don't like going to see my own movies".

Attenborough was to reprise his role for the fourth film, but he suffered a fall at his home in 2008 and subsequently retired from acting. He died in 2014.

== Reception ==
Roger Ebert, reviewing the first film, found Hammond to have limited characterization, writing "there was an opportunity here to make his character grand and original, colorful and oversize, and instead he comes across as unfocused and benign."

In 2015, Neil Mitchell of the British Film Institute listed Hammond among Attenborough's most essential performances: "Charming, sophisticated and single-minded, Hammond was also deeply flawed, a personality trait Attenborough always excelled at portraying. The veteran actor brought a lifetime's experience to a character as myopic as he was visionary." In 2017, Tom Chapman from Screen Rant ranked Hammond as the fifth best character in the film series, writing "it is hard to imagine the first film without Attenborough's cane-wielding performance." He added, "As the jolly mad scientist, Jurassic Park literally owes its entire creation to Hammond".

Around the first film's 30th anniversary, several media outlets examined Hammond's role, generally deeming him a subtle villain. Simon Gallagher of Screen Rant argued that Hammond deserved to die for his "insatiable ambition that fundamentally disrespects nature". Sean Pagnotti of Collider called him a "capitalist monster" and a "charming embodiment of toxic positive manifestation", writing that it is "not unusual to feel sorry for the poor, old billionaire" due to his charisma and Attenborough's performance. Noting the Lockwood backstory provided in the Jurassic World films, Ray Clough of MovieWeb wrote, "Acting as the ultimate hypocrite, Hammond would state that creating a cloned human was unholy and morally corrupt, despite the fact that he was doing the same thing with a once-extinct species." Ben Sherlock, also of Screen Rant, believed that the storyline throughout the films would have turned out differently had Hammond remained a full antagonist in the original film, suggesting for example that he might have encouraged human cloning in the interest of profit.

Tara Bennett of Syfy Wire called Hammond the worst villain in the film series: "We know this ranking will be controversial, but don't let that grandfatherly look fool you." Bennett noted that dinosaurs roam the world again in Jurassic World Dominion because Hammond helped resurrect them in the first place. Rory Piñata of MovieWeb likewise blamed Hammond for the events of the first film and subsequent events in the later films, and also felt that he deserved to die for his greed. Lisa Nordin of Collider called Hammond a complex character, not easily identifiable as either a "hero" or "villain".

== Other media ==
Attenborough voiced Hammond in two video games: Chaos Island: The Lost World (1997), and Trespasser (1998). The latter features Hammond's memoirs, narrated to the player throughout the game. A 22-part fan-made prequel series, focusing on Hammond's life, was released online in 2021, using clips from the films and the memoirs from Trespasser.

Hammond also appears in the games Jurassic Park: Operation Genesis (2003), Jurassic World Evolution (2018) and Jurassic World Evolution 2 (2021). He is voiced by Bud Tingwell in Operation Genesis, and by Mackenzie Gray in the Evolution games. The statue from the first Jurassic World film was also briefly available to players of Jurassic World Evolution 2 (2021). Some of Attenborough's dialogue from the films was re-used in trailers for the Jurassic World films. The character and first film are spoofed in a 2015 episode of Sesame Street, with Cookie Monster taking on the role of Hammond.

Although Jurassic Park toys had existed since 1993, Hammond did not receive an action figure until 2019, when Mattel released one in limited quantity for the 2019 San Diego Comic-Con. The company subsequently released a Hammond figure as part of its Amber Collection.

Hammond's death in the novel is referenced in the third season of Jurassic World Camp Cretaceous, when Yaz repeats a story she heard about the original park owner being eaten alive by Procompsognathus after breaking his ankle. Darius then says that Hammond died of natural causes.
