= Lego Jurassic World: Legend of Isla Nublar =

Animated Lego Jurassic World series

- Developed by: Adam Beechen; Jason Cosler; Lars Danielsen; David Shayne
- Directed by: Ken Cunningham; Andrew Duncan
- Starring: Ian Hanlin; Britt McKillip; Dhirendra; Alex Zahara; Vincent Tong; Adrian Petriw
- Music by: Steffan Andrews
- Countries of origin: United States; Canada
- Original language: English
- No. of episodes: 13 (+2 specials)

Production
- Executive producers: Adam Beechen; Jill Wilfert; Jennifer McCarron
- Producers: Jason Cosler; Lars Danielsen
- Editor: Mitchell Stookey
- Running time: 22 minutes
- Production companies: Atomic Cartoons; LEGO

Original release
- Network: Family Channel (Canada); Nickelodeon (USA)
- Release: July 6 – October 30, 2019

Related
- Lego Jurassic World: The Secret Exhibit

Lego Jurassic World: Legend of Isla Nublar is a 13-episode CG-animated television miniseries that acts as a prequel to the 2015 film Jurassic World. Set in 2012 and inspired by the Lego toyline, the show is a direct followup to the Lego Jurassic World: The Secret Exhibit television special that debuted on NBC in the United States in 2018. The series began airing in Canada on Family Channel on July 6, 2019.

== Plot ==
The series takes place at Jurassic World, a dinosaur theme park on the island of Isla Nublar. Velociraptor handler Owen Grady and the park's operations manager Claire Dearing work to keep Jurassic World from falling into ruin. They are unaware that Dennis Nedry's nephew Danny Nedermeyer has a secret agenda to ruin the park.

== Cast ==
- Ian Hanlin as Owen Grady
- Britt McKillip as Claire Dearing
- Nicholas Holmes as Hudson Harper
- Dhirendra as Simon Masrani
- Shekhar Paleja as Sedrick Masrani
- Alex Zahara as Vic Hoskins and Dino Guide
- Vincent Tong as Dr. Henry Wu and IT Tech
- Bethany Brown as Allison Miles
- Adrian Petriw as Danny Nedermeyer
- Andrew Kavadas as Sinjin Prescott
- Kirby Morrow as Larson Mitchell
- William Kuklis as Dennis Nedry
- Alison Matthews as O.O.P.S.I. and Line Jumper
- Bradley Duffy as Dr. Ian Malcolm
- Adrian Hough as Dr. Alan Grant
- Patricia Drake as Dianne
- Aidan Drummond as Robbie

== Episodes ==
No.	Title	Written by	Original release date	Prod. code	U.S. viewers (millions)
1	"Mission: Critical!"	Adam Beechen	July 6, 2019 (CAN); September 14, 2019 (USA)	101	0.87
June 7, 2012: When influential theme park critic Larson Mitchell visits Jurassic World, park owner Simon Masrani and assistant manager Claire Dearing are eager to impress him. Claire recruits the park's raptor trainer, Owen Grady, to help give Mitchell a guided tour, keeping him away from areas of the park that are undergoing maintenance. Disgruntled park employee Danny Nedermeyer, the nephew of Dennis Nedry, tries to disrupt Mitchell's visit in a covert attempt to bring down Jurassic World. Mitchell, annoyed by Claire and Owen, sneaks off for a self-guided tour. While travelling over the Tyrannosaurus enclosure, Danny secretly sabotages Mitchell's gondola ride and puts him at danger of being consumed by the dinosaur. Owen and Claire find Mitchell, and Owen uses his animal behaviorist skills to dissuade the Tyrannosaurus from harming them. Although Mitchell is upset by his experience, he believes that Masrani has the right people to get the park under control. Danny intends to continue his secret efforts to bring down Jurassic World, in honor of his uncle. Geneticist Dr. Allison Miles is annoyed by fellow scientist Dr. Henry Wu and is tired of him constantly giving her orders, so Danny, delightedly sensing an opportunity of trouble, tries convincing her to become his accomplice. Simultaneously, Danny has recruited adventurer Sinjin Prescott to search for the lost treasure of Captain No Beard on Isla Nublar.
2	"Stampede!"	Mairghread Scott	July 13, 2019 (CAN); September 21, 2019 (USA)	102	0.90
June 11, 2012: When Masrani and Claire get stranded in the jungle during a storm, Vic and his security team head out to find them. When the security team gets lost in the jungle, Owen sets out to find Masrani and Claire on his own. Masrani and Claire take shelter in an old trailer that belonged to Dennis Nedry, who had been searching for the island's treasure years earlier. Hoping to impress Masrani and earn a promotion, Claire leaves the trailer and tries to obtain a cell phone signal to call for help. Meanwhile, Sinjin continues his search for the island's treasure, which Danny will use to fund the creation of new dinosaurs for his own theme park. Sinjin discovers that a missing piece of the treasure map is in the trailer. However, the map piece flies out of the trailer when Masrani opens the door, and it lands in a mud puddle, where it disintegrates. A Sinoceratops stampede heads toward the trailer as Owen finds Claire, and they manage to use their Jeep to tow the trailer out of harm's way, saving Masrani.
3	"The Hybrid Horror!"	David McDermott	July 20, 2019 (CAN); September 28, 2019 (USA)	103	0.77
June 13, 2012: Owen moves into Dennis Nedry's old trailer and removes its contents, including old Jurassic Park memorabilia. Among the contents is a VHS tape that Nedry made; Sinjin and Danny believe it will lead them to the treasure. However, before Sinjin can retrieve the tape, Masrani decides to put the contents on display in a new exhibit about Jurassic Park. Danny volunteers to work with Claire on setting up the exhibit, hoping to obtain the tape. However, it is ultimately sealed in a secure glass case for the exhibit. Meanwhile. Dr. Wu creates a Tyrannosaurus/Ankylosaurus hybrid dinosaur as a new theme park attraction for Masrani. Because Masrani wants the dinosaur ready later that day, Wu speeds up the creature's growth. When the full-grown dinosaur escapes, Owen and Claire work to contain it. Owen deduces that the dinosaur is simply scared, as it still has the brain of a juvenile despite having a full-grown body. Eager to utilize his security team, Vic proceeds with efforts to stop the dinosaur, but fails. Owen and Claire contain the dinosaur and relocate it to the island's northern sector, where other hybrid dinosaurs have been sent to live.
4	"Pteranodon't!"	Jeremy Adams	July 27, 2019 (CAN); October 5, 2019 (USA)	104	0.82
June 16, 2012: The Stygimoloch from the park's dinosaur carousel escapes and runs wild through the park as it closes for the day. Hudson Harper, a boy staying at the park, reports the escaped Stygimoloch and it is later captured. Although the Pteranodon aviary is closed, Hudson convinces a park employee to let him inside. However, Hudson is snatched by a Pteranodon which intends to feed him to its babies. Owen convinces the Stygimoloch to accept him as its alpha, and he uses the animal as part of a rescue mission to save Hudson, after Vic and his security team fail to do so. Meanwhile, Danny and Sinjin plan to sneak through the visitor center's air ducts to steal the VHS tape, but they need an executive key card to access the ducts. Danny has Allison steal Dr. Wu's key card in exchange for a position as chief scientist at Danny's planned theme park. Danny and Sinjin wind up triggering the security alarm during their theft. Claire finds Sinjin with the tape and pursues him. When Sinjin tosses the tape into a dinosaur enclosure, Claire goes to retrieve it, giving him the chance to escape. Claire intends to find out what is on the tape that made it important enough to steal.
5	"The Power and the Peril!"	David Shayne	September 6, 2019 (CAN); October 12, 2019 (USA)	105	0.61
June 29, 2012: Dr. Ian Malcolm returns to Isla Nublar to give a lecture and promote his new book. Masrani makes poor modifications to the park's power plant to handle the extra tourists who will be visiting the island to see Malcolm. Subsequent power surges cause issues at the park while Owen and Claire are giving Malcolm a tour. Later, they accompany Malcolm on a monorail to the amphitheater where he will give his lecture. Hudson, a fan of Malcolm, also joins them. Owen becomes secretly jealous as Claire seems to become infatuated with Malcolm. Because of a power surge, the monorail speeds out of control, but Malcolm rips out several wires which halt the monorail. At the power plant, Owen and his raptors bypass electrical hazards and reach a control panel to resolve the power issue. Claire reveals to Owen that she had only been complimenting Malcolm earlier in order to boost his ego ahead of his lecture. She also tells Hudson that Owen saved the park, prompting Hudson to admire him and convince his parents to indefinitely extend their stay at Jurassic World. Meanwhile, unable to obtain the VHS tape, Danny instead hypnotizes Sinjin to help him remember footage of the tape that he had briefly viewed when Masrani previously played the tape in Dennis Nedry's trailer. However, Sinjin is unable to recall the footage.
6	"Spit Take!"	Mairghread Scott	September 9, 2019 (CAN); January 5, 2020 (USA)	106	0.48
July 2, 2012: Masrani has a juvenile Dilophosaurus put on display inside Jurassic World's hotel, but it escapes and roams the building. Vic wants his security team to be taken seriously, so he puts them through training to prepare for any emergency. However, Claire wants to keep the escaped Dilophosaurus a secret from Vic, afraid that his team would damage the hotel in their search for the dinosaur. Claire reluctantly agrees to let Owen use his raptors to find the Dilophosaurus, and Vic and his team search the hotel as well upon learning of the situation. Owen, with help from the raptors and his dog Red, is able to apprehend the Dilophosaurus and relocate it.
7	"A Fish Story" "Fish Story!"	David McDermott	September 10, 2019 (CAN); January 12, 2020 (USA)	107	0.52
July 5, 2012: The Carnotaurus and Baryonyx from the park's dinosaur carousel escape containment and flee into the jungle. Owen enlists Red and Blue to track the Carnotaurus, but he needs a vehicle to proceed with the hunt. Vic's security team believes that he does not get along with Owen, so he makes an attempt to bond with Owen by inviting him to go fishing. Owen accepts Vic's offer, but only so he can take control of Vic's vehicle. Claire is overwhelmed by paperwork, and Danny decides to help her, hoping to rush her home so he can retrieve Dennis Nedry's VHS tape from her office. Meanwhile, Sinjin goes to the abandoned Jurassic Park visitor center to look for a VCR in order to play the tape. Owen and Vic encounter Sinjin, who claims to be looking for his lost golf ball after playing at the park's golf course. The Baryonyx and Carnotaurus find each other at the visitor center and Vic uses a weapon to shock the dinosaurs into unconsciousness, allowing them to be apprehended. Sinjin sneaks away with a VCR, and Danny finally retrieves the tape after Claire goes home for the night.
8	"Blown Away!"	Jeremy Adams	September 11, 2019 (CAN); January 19, 2020 (USA)	108	0.51
July 8, 2012: Dr. Alan Grant returns to Isla Nublar to speak at the grand opening of a new Jurassic World pavilion named after him, in exchange for research funding. Masrani has Grant stay at the island in hopes of having him endorse the park, which would increase attendance. Masrani plans to take Grant on a helicopter tour of the island, so Danny sabotages the helicopter in hopes of preventing an endorsement from Grant. Owen looks up to Grant as a hero, and he accompanies Grant and Masrani on the tour. After the helicopter crashes in the jungle, Owen helps lead the others as they face a storm. The three men are swept away by strong winds and fall into a lagoon inhabited by the park's Mosasaurus. Claire finds the men and rescues them with help from Red and the raptors. Grant decides to endorse the park, thinking of the earlier events as freak accidents.
9	"Haunted and Hunted!" "The Haunted and the Hunted!"	David Shayne	September 12, 2019 (CAN); January 26, 2020 (USA)	109	0.43
July 10, 2012: Masrani is having timeshare villas constructed on Isla Nublar, but a mysterious construction incident occurs one night, leading the crew to believe that a ghost was responsible. Owen is babysitting Hudson, and they accompany Claire to the construction site to investigate. They eventually discover that a baby dinosaur was responsible for the incident. The dinosaur is a failed hybrid experiment, and it had escaped from an area of the island reserved for such dinosaurs. Meanwhile, Dr. Wu is having difficulty perfecting the DNA that is needed to create a successful hybrid dinosaur. Dr. Wu is illogically unwilling to believe that he is in error, thinking that the issue lies with his computer. Allison perfects the DNA, but Dr. Wu has contacted a technical support employee who shuts off the computer, erasing Allison's progress. Finally fed up with Dr. Wu and his irrationality and ridiculousness towards her, she decides to abandon him and informs Danny that she has decided to join him as the geneticist for his future dinosaur park. Danny and Sinjin watch Dennis Nedry's VHS tape to learn the location of the treasure.
10	"To the Extreme!"	David McDermott	September 26, 2019 (CAN); February 2, 2020 (USA)	110	0.49
July 14, 2012: Masrani wants his employees to perform a series of extreme stunts around the park, but Owen and Claire believe the employees are not properly trained. Danny secretly injects the dinosaurs' water supply with a new Jurassic World energy drink, causing them to become hyper-active. When Hudson overhears Danny's plan to bring down Jurassic World, Danny abducts him. Fed up with Masrani's irrational nonsense, Owen decides to quit his job when Masrani wants him to become one of the stunt people, but Claire convinces him to return to help deal with the dinosaur situation. Owen and Claire tranquilize the dinosaurs, and Masrani reconciles with Owen before they all begin to realize that something rather strange and suspicious is going on that keeps causing all these schemes to the park that they have to keep putting right. Allison steals dinosaur cloning files before joining Danny and Sinjin as they head out to search for the treasure with a very large crate.
11	"Symptoms!"	Jeremy Adams	October 11, 2019 (CAN); February 16, 2020 (USA)	111	0.53
July 15, 2012: Claire becomes concerned when Dr. Wu informs her that Allison has not returned from her lunch break, unaware that she has actually abandoned him because of his cruel behavior towards her. Owen, Claire and the raptors go into the jungle to search for Allison. Owen is exposed to poison from a prehistoric flower, which is capable of causing several symptoms and eventually death. One symptom is truth-telling, and Owen is embarrassed when he reveals to Claire that he loves her. Claire locates an old medical station and acquires antidote to stop the poison, but an escaped Allosaurus finds them. The raptors drive the Allosaurus off, but Owen now believes he is a dinosaur, another symptom of the poison. Claire quickly treats Owen with the antidote, and he is unable to recall the recent events, including his disclosure that he loves Claire. Although she feels the same way about him, she does not tell him that he said such a thing to her, since they're both embarrassed to confess it to each other. Meanwhile, Allison is shocked to learn that Danny intends to destroy Jurassic World as part of his quest to open his own dinosaur park. Allison and Hudson attempt an escape, but Hudson is apprehended. Finally realizing the mistake she's made, Allison heads back and finds Owen and Claire, and informs them of Danny's plan. Elsewhere, Masrani is bored and decides to become Dr. Wu's temporary assistant while Allison is not around. However, Masrani is unable to do anything right, and Dr. Wu eventually fires him.
12	"Under the Volcano!"	Adam Beechen	October 29, 2019 (CAN); February 23, 2020 (USA)	112	0.53
July 15, 2012: Allison helps lead Owen and Claire to Danny and the others, who are inside the island's volcano looking for the treasure. Inside the crate is a dinosaur mech suit which Danny uses to search for the treasure. Danny has also hacked into the control room computers and initiated a shutdown of the electrified fences, allowing the dinosaurs to escape their enclosures. Masrani and Dr. Wu evacuate the park guests to the hotels, and Hudson is able to contact Vic for help. Vic uses a drone vehicle to get to the volcano, where he, Allison, Owen, and Claire find Danny and the others as they locate the treasure. However, the previously escaped Allosaurus finds them and engages Danny's mech suit into battle, believing that it is another dinosaur.
13	"The Monsters and the Mech!"	Adam Beechen	October 30, 2019 (CAN); March 1, 2020 (USA)	113	0.42
July 15, 2012: In the park, Masrani and Dr. Wu try to distract the dinosaurs to prevent them from causing damage to the buildings. Vic and Hudson use the drone to return to the safety of the park, but they discover that the dinosaurs are on the loose. Vic emits a tranquilizer mist from the drone to put the animals to sleep, although he runs out of mist before he can use it on the T-Rex. Hudson decides that they can convince and lure the T-Rex to the volcano to help the Allosaurus fight Danny's mech suit. The dinosaurs are stopped in the ensuing battle, but not before they manage to defeat Danny and Sinjin anyways. They are picked up by Danny's mother, Dianne, who is upset that he has failed to bring back the treasure. Claire decides the treasure will be put on display in a new park exhibit about the history of Isla Nublar. Vic is tasked with carrying the treasure chest back to the park with his drone, although he runs into a Pteranodon and accidentally drops the chest into the volcano. As Owen, Claire and Hudson celebrate, Wu urges Masrani not to punish Allison for her betrayal, taking partial responsibility for the reason why she abandoned him, and Masrani promotes her to the position of associate chief scientist while she and Wu reconcile and make up for their earlier quarrels.

== Specials (2020) ==
Title	Directed by	Written by	Original release date	Prod. code	U.S. viewers (millions)
"Double Trouble - Part 1: Loosing Control"	Ken Cunningham	Adam Beechen	August 23, 2020 (USA); November 22, 2020 (CAN)	997	0.28
Sedrick Masrani, Simon Masrani's twin brother, takes over Jurassic World, due to Simon's many previous insane ideas to make the Park a lot more fun and interesting for the guests, but soon finds out that he has bitten off more than he can chew.
"Double Trouble - Part 2: Sibling Rivalry"	Ken Cunningham	Adam Beechen	August 30, 2020; November 22, 2020 (CAN)	996	0.23

== Broadcast ==
In Australia, the series debuted on 9Go! on August 15, 2019. In the United States, Nickelodeon picked up the series and began airing it on September 14, with the first episode made available on video-on-demand platforms beginning August 25, 2019. ITV in the United Kingdom premiered the series as part of their CITV block on September 7, 2019.

== See also ==
- Lego Jurassic World (theme)
- Lego Jurassic World: The Secret Exhibit
- Lego Jurassic World (video game)
- Lego Dimensions
- List of films featuring dinosaurs
- Dinosaurs in Jurassic Park
