= Ian Malcolm (Jurassic Park) =

Jurassic Park character

- Jurassic Park character
- Jeff Goldblum as Dr. Ian Malcolm in Jurassic Park (1993)
- First appearance: Jurassic Park (novel; 1990)
- Last appearance: Jurassic World Evolution 3 (video game; 2025)
- Created by: Michael Crichton
- Adapted by: Steven Spielberg; David Koepp
- Portrayed by: Jeff Goldblum
- Voiced by: Fred Young (Jurassic Park Pinball); Jeff Goldblum (The Lost World: Jurassic Park video game, Chaos Island: The Lost World, Jurassic World Evolution, Jurassic World Evolution 2, Jurassic World Evolution 3); Bradley Duffy (Lego Jurassic World: Legend of Isla Nublar); Maurice LaMarche (Animaniacs)

In-universe information
- Occupation: Mathematician; Chaotician
- Family: Dr. Sarah Harding (love interest); Kelly Curtis (daughter in film only)

Dr. Ian Malcolm is a fictional character from the Jurassic Park franchise created by Michael Crichton and portrayed by Jeff Goldblum. Malcolm is a gifted, skeptical, and sarcastic mathematician from the University of Texas at Austin who specializes in chaos theory. The character was inspired in part by American historian of science James Gleick and French mathematician Ivar Ekeland. In Crichton's 1990 novel Jurassic Park and its 1993 film adaptation, Malcolm is invited by insurance lawyer Donald Gennaro to notice any problems with John Hammond's dinosaur theme park, Jurassic Park. Malcolm was intended by Crichton to fill in the role of the audience in the scenarios he is put through. Malcolm is a secondary protagonist in the original novel and the main protagonist in the sequel, The Lost World, due to positive fan reception from Goldblum's performance as the character in director Steven Spielberg's film adaptation of the original novel.

Goldblum's role as Ian Malcolm in Jurassic Park skyrocketed his career. Malcolm has become one of Goldblum's most popular characters and has been depicted in many forms of popular culture. The character's signature line, "Life finds a way", has become synonymous with Goldblum and the Jurassic Park franchise, and Malcolm has been recognized as the franchise's most enduring character.

== Fictional character biography ==
In Crichton's novel, Dr. Ian Malcolm, along with paleontologist Dr. Alan Grant and paleobotanist Dr. Ellie Sattler, is hired as a consultant by InGen CEO John Hammond to provide opinions on Jurassic Park, a theme park on the remote island of Isla Nublar that features genetically recreated dinosaurs. Malcolm is the most pessimistic about the idea of the park, feeling that Hammond and his scientists have not taken the time or effort to fully understand what they are creating. In particular, he points out that Hammond's assertion that the dinosaurs can be controlled through sterilization and managed breeding is foolish since there are far too many unpredictable variables where biology is concerned.

During a tour of the park, disgruntled computer programmer Dennis Nedry shuts down power to the park to gain access to dinosaur embryos to sell to a rival. Nedry's actions cause the electrified fences to shut down as well, allowing the dinosaurs to escape from their paddocks. Malcolm is attacked by a Tyrannosaurus rex, which breaks his leg. Malcolm is found by game warden Robert Muldoon and attorney Donald Gennaro and taken back to one of the lodges to be looked after by park veterinarian Gerry Harding. Harding administers morphine to Malcolm, who spends the rest of the incident ranting about science and philosophy while attempting to assist the other survivors. His condition continues to worsen, and by the time the Costa Rica Air Force arrives to Isla Nublar, Malcolm is said to have died from his injuries.

In the sequel, The Lost World, it is revealed that the declaration of his death was premature, and Malcolm was able to be saved. Malcolm is upgraded to the main protagonist of the sequel, which begins with him giving a lecture on extinction and chaos theory. It is also stated that Malcolm used to date Sarah Harding, and they have remained friends. Malcolm and Sarah are approached by paleontologist Richard Levine, who wants him to help find a "Lost World". Though Malcolm refuses the offer many times, he eventually relents and travels to Isla Sorna. Malcolm injures his leg again during an encounter with another Tyrannosaurus, but survives.

== Film adaptation ==
The film adaptation of Crichton's novel directed by Steven Spielberg features actor Jeff Goldblum in the role of Ian Malcolm. Unlike in the book, Malcolm is never declared dead in the film adaptation, but is severely injured by the Tyrannosaurus. In the film, Malcolm's injury comes from attempting to lure the T. rex away from the car carrying Tim and Lex Murphy, whereas in the novel Malcolm's injury came out of cowardice (more akin to the death of Donald Gennaro in the film). This change was suggested by Goldblum. Goldblum reprised his role for the sequel, The Lost World: Jurassic Park, in Jurassic World: Fallen Kingdom in a minor role, and alongside Sam Neill (Alan Grant) and Laura Dern (Ellie Sattler) in Jurassic World Dominion. Some fans found the personality changes of Malcolm from the first movie to the character seen in The Lost World to be somewhat drastic, and some have speculated that the character has PTSD after his trip to Jurassic Park.

In the first film, it is stated that Malcolm has been married several times and has three children. One of his children, Kelly Curtis, appears in The Lost World: Jurassic Park. By the time of the sixth film, he has had two more.

== Production ==
Before Goldblum was cast, comedic actor Jim Carrey had auditioned for the role of Ian Malcolm. The film's casting director, Janet Hirschenson, believed that Goldblum was the perfect actor for the role. Referring to Carrey's audition, she stated Carrey "was terrific, too, but I think pretty quickly we all loved the idea of Jeff."

Cameron Thor had initially auditioned for Malcolm, but he was cast as Dodgson. In the novel, Malcolm states that he only ever wears black so he does not have to put much thought towards what he wears. This is a characteristic shared with an earlier Goldblum character, Seth Brundle from The Fly. Malcolm's line, "must go faster", was reused by another Goldblum character, David Levinson in Independence Day.

== Reception ==
Goldblum's portrayal as Ian Malcolm was lauded by fans and critics. Malcolm is the most popular character in the franchise, and is one of Goldblum's most popular roles. Goldblum was nominated for a Saturn Award for Best Supporting Actor for his portrayal in Jurassic Park alongside Wayne Knight as Dennis Nedry, but both lost to Lance Henriksen in Hard Target. Goldblum was also nominated for a Blockbuster Entertainment Award for Favorite Actor - SciFi for his role in The Lost World: Jurassic Park.

Goldblum's lack of screen time and over marketing in Jurassic World: Fallen Kingdom was criticized by fans of the franchise, who had felt like the marketing for the film relied too heavily on featuring Goldblum's return as Ian Malcolm, only for the actor to appear in only two short scenes at the start and very end of the film. Timothy Donohoo of Comic Book Resources was critical of Malcolm's characterization in Jurassic World Dominion, calling the film his worst appearance in the series. Donohoo wrote that while the first two films depict Malcolm as "a cynical voice of reason", Dominion "reduces him to a source for inane comedy", opining that Goldblum essentially played himself.

== Legacy ==
Goldblum with his shirt open as Malcolm, commonly recognized as having established the character as a sex symbol

Ian Malcolm is one of Goldblum's most iconic and frequently referenced characters. Malcolm and another character, Dr. Henry Wu, have appeared in four films throughout the series, more than any other characters. Malcolm has been referenced in different dinosaur studies, as well as his line, "Life finds a way". The quote has become synonymous with the Jurassic Park franchise as well as with Goldblum himself. The character also reinvigorated an interest in chaos theory, due to a scene where Malcolm flirts with Ellie Sattler while discussing it.

A scene from the first film where Malcolm appears with his shirt open has been widely noted by Goldblum as the primary reason the character was established as a sex symbol, with the pose serving as the subject of many tattoos, Internet memes, a Funko toy figure, as well as receiving a statue in Potters Fields Park in London.

== See also ==
- List of Jurassic Park characters
