= The Lost World (Crichton novel) =

1995 novel by Michael Crichton

- First edition cover
- Author: Michael Crichton
- Cover artist: Chip Kidd
- Language: English
- Genre: Sci-fi action
- Publisher: Knopf
- Publication date: September 20, 1995
- Publication place: United States
- Media type: Print (hardcover)
- Pages: 393
- ISBN: 0-679-41946-2
- OCLC: 32924490
- Dewey Decimal: 813/.54 20
- LC Class: PS3553.R48 L67 1995b
- Preceded by: Jurassic Park

The Lost World is a 1995 science fiction action novel written by Michael Crichton, and the sequel to his 1990 novel Jurassic Park. It is Crichton's tenth novel under his own name, his twentieth overall, and the only sequel he ever wrote. It was published by Knopf. A paperback edition followed in 1996. A year later, both novels were re-published as a single book titled Michael Crichton's Jurassic World, which is unrelated to the 2015 film of the same name.

== Plot ==
In 1993, chaos theorist Ian Malcolm, having survived the disaster at Jurassic Park four years before, gives a lecture on extinction and is challenged by paleontologist Richard Levine. Levine persuades Malcolm to help search for a "lost world" of dinosaurs. They learn of InGen's secret "Site B", where the park's dinosaurs were created. Eighteen months later, Levine spontaneously travels to what he believes is Site B. Arriving with a Costa Rican guide, the two are attacked by an animal and his guide is killed. Meanwhile, corporate spy Ed James reports Levine's activities to Lewis Dodgson of Biosyn, InGen's rival.

Two middle school students assisting Levine, R. B. "Arby" Benton and Kelly Curtis, enlist retired professor Jack "Doc" Thorne after Levine's disappearance. They determine his destination as Isla Sorna, one of the five islands in the Las Cinco Muertes island chain. Thorne, Malcolm, and Thorne's assistant Eddie Carr embark on an expedition to rescue Levine. Thorne contacts behavioral biologist Sarah Harding and asks her to join them. The group arrives on the island with specialized trailers, an electric Ford Explorer, and an electric motorcycle. Unbeknownst to the adults, Arby and Kelly have stowed away in one of the trailers. Inside, Arby accesses the InGen network and sees live footage of dinosaurs.

The group finds Levine, who is ungrateful for the rescue. To obseve the dinosaurs, the men deploy a high platform overlooking a clearing. Meanwhile, Dodgson learns of Levine's expedition and goes to Isla Sorna with Howard King and George Baselton, intending to steal dinosaur eggs for Biosyn. Before departing, they encounter Harding and offer to give her a ride to Isla Sorna. Harding survives an attempt by Dodgson to throw her overboard and eventually joins Malcolm's group on the island. Dodgson's group, using an ultrasound emitter to ward away the animals, raid a Maiasaura nest, and then a Tyrannosaurus nest, injuring an infant in the process. When the emitter fails, Baselton is killed and the others are scattered; King is later killed by Velociraptors.

Malcolm's group find and treat the injured infant rex. Its parents attack the trailers, pushing one over a cliff and severely injuring Malcolm. The raptors then assault the platform and kill Eddie. Arby survives by sealing himself in a cylindrical survival cage that the raptors roll away, but one raptor runs off with the key stuck in its mouth. Harding and Kelly retrieve the key after pursuing the raptor on their motorcycle. Thorne and Levine track the other raptors to their nest, rescue Arby, and reach the abandoned worker village; the reunited party takes shelter in the general store. While venturing out for fuel, Thorne encounters a pair of color-changing Carnotaurus, which Levine and Harding fend off by flashing lights in their eyes.

At dawn, a Maiasaura herd, looking for their stolen eggs, destroy the remaining vehicle. Harding goes to retrieve the Explorer, but finds Dodgson trying to steal it. When an adult Tyrannosaurus appears, Harding forces Dodgson out into the open, and the rex carries him to its nest to feeds its young. The group misses their helicopter extraction, but Kelly locates a boat dock via the network. As raptors break into the store, the group reaches the dock and escapes by boat. Levine is optimistic that the island will reveal the nature of extinction, seeing it as a pristine "lost world". However, Malcolm and Harding inform him of a discovery they made: InGen had accidentally fed the dinosaurs sheep extract infected with prions. The resulting disease shortens the dinosaurs' lifespans, allowing the island's unnatural abundance of predators.

== Background ==
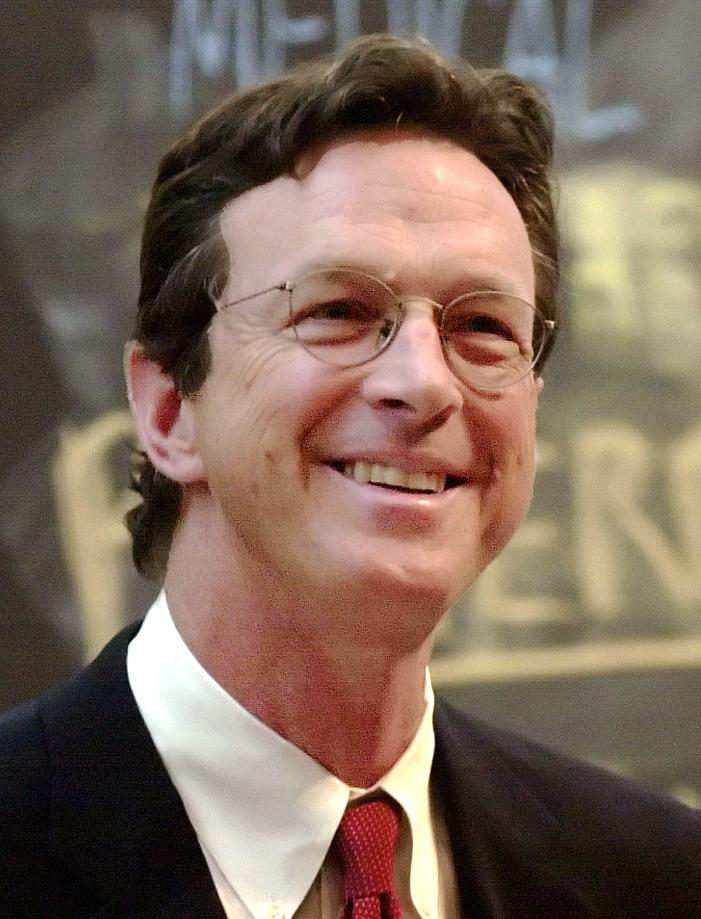
Author Michael Crichton in 2002

After the publication of Jurassic Park in 1990, author Michael Crichton was pressured by fans to write a sequel. Following the success of Jurassic Park's film adaptation in 1993, director Steven Spielberg became interested in making a sequel film. Crichton had never written a sequel to any of his novels before and was initially hesitant to do so. He said a sequel was "a very difficult structural problem because it has to be the same but different; if it's really the same, then it's the same—and if it's really different, then it's not a sequel. So it's in some funny intermediate territory". In March 1994, Crichton said there would probably be a sequel novel as well as a film adaptation, stating that he had an idea for the novel's story.

Although the character of Ian Malcolm had originally died in the first novel, Crichton chose to bring him back for the sequel: "Malcolm came back because I needed him. I could do without the others, but not him because he is the 'ironic commentator' on the action. He keeps telling us why it will go bad. And I had to have him back again". Bringing a dead character back was an idea Crichton got from Arthur Conan Doyle, who did the same with his character Sherlock Holmes. Malcolm was also considered a favorite character among readers of the first novel and people who watched its film adaptation. An early draft of the novel included a lengthy tirade by Malcolm regarding God and evolution, but Crichton removed it "because it just didn't seem to fit". One early draft included a substantially different ending to the published version. It featured a character named Elliot Wu, the brother of Henry Wu, Jurassic Park's chief geneticist in the first novel. Elliot himself originally served as a scientist before taking on the role of caretaker for Isla Sorna in the aftermath of the disaster at Jurassic Park and the dissolution of employer InGen.

In March 1995, Crichton announced that he was nearly finished writing the novel, with a scheduled release for later that year. At the time, Crichton declined to specify the novel's title or plot. Crichton later stated that the novel's title is an homage to Doyle's 1912 novel of the same name, as well as the 1925 film adaptation of Doyle's novel, also titled The Lost World. Crichton's novel also shares some story similarities with Doyle's novel, as they both involve an expedition to an isolated Central American location where dinosaurs roam. However, in Crichton's novel, the dinosaurs were recreated by genetic engineering, rather than surviving from antiquity. The Lost World was the only book sequel Crichton ever wrote.

The Lost World was released on September 20, 1995. It was published by Knopf, with an initial printing of 1.7 million copies, a high number reflective of Crichton's popularity at the time. Crichton went on a press tour to promote the novel's release. In 2021, the Folio Society published a special edition of the novel with illustrations of select scenes.

== Reception ==
The Lost World spent eight weeks as number one on the New York Times Best Seller List, from October 8, 1995, to November 26, 1995, and it remained on the list as late as March 1996.

People wrote: "Action-packed and camera-ready, The Lost World is to its predecessor what microwave dinners are to home-cooked meals: hardly authentic, but in a pinch fully satisfying". The magazine wrote that "the odd reappearance of Ian Malcolm, when other key characters from the original have been dropped, makes one wonder if only Jeff Goldblum was available to appear in the movie sequel. But even at his most calculating—incorporating two urchins, crafting a feminist hero—the author pleases. Characteristically clever, fast-paced and engaging, Michael Crichton's latest work accomplishes what he set out to do: offer the still-harrowing thrills of a by-now-familiar ride".

Michiko Kakutani of The New York Times gave the novel a negative review and called it a "tired rehash" of Jurassic Park. She wrote that the novel lacked the "surprise or ingenuity" of its predecessor, calling it "so predictable and unimaginative that it seems to have been intended to save special-effects technicians the hassle of doing new work on the movie sequel". Kakutani said the novel represented "a new low" in Crichton's "attention to character", and criticized the character of Malcolm in particular: "Except for complaining about the injuries he suffered in 'Jurassic Park', Malcolm makes virtually no reference to his previous visit to dino-land [...]. Instead of even making a half-hearted attempt to turn Malcolm into a reasonable facsimile of a person, Mr. Crichton cynically uses him as a mouthpiece for all sorts of portentous techno-babble about chaos theory, extinction theories and mankind's destructive nature. As for the other characters, they are each given handy labels for easy identification".

Tom De Haven of Entertainment Weekly gave the novel a "B−" rating and wrote that it "is like a videogame in prose—a few hundred frantic pages of run, hide, kill, and die. Over and over again". De Haven criticized the lack of characterization and wrote that Crichton was "clearly off his stride here, right from the start. Without any need to build scientific plausibility into the plot (he did that last time, beautifully), Crichton seems unengaged by his own material, distanced from it, and his cautionary lectures about extinction and natural selection seem halfhearted attempts to legitimize his return to familiar territory. But if there's a lack of freshness to the novel (even the title isn't new; it's borrowed from the granddaddy of all dinosaur tales, by Arthur Conan Doyle), it is still a very scary read".

De Haven felt that the novel's opening chapters were "rushed and contrived. Although it's perhaps a deliberate, affectionate nod to the old let's-get-going-so-we-can-get-to-the-good-parts kind of storytelling that was such a staple of 1950s monster movies, it's still cheesy. [...] No matter how feeble the premise, though, or how shallow the characterizations, I wouldn't dream of talking anybody out of reading the novel. For clarity, terror, and sheer grisliness, the action far surpasses anything in the original book; even better, the suspense is masterfully stretched out, then released all of a sudden—just when you least expect it". De Haven concluded that its predecessor "has earned a secure place for itself in the history of popular American literature. The Lost World, at best, will be a footnote. But still, it made my palms sweat".

Neal Karlen of the Los Angeles Times wrote that Crichton "has done the sequel step just right, keeping the tropes of the earlier novel familiar for the fans while changing the ideas and story line enough to keep even his severest and most envious critics turning the pages to find out what happens next". Karlen noted that, "Once again, the dinosaurs seem the real stars", while writing that the human characters "are introduced as if in shorthand screenplay form". Karlen especially praised the novel's raptors, calling them "seemingly meaner, more loathsome, and once again better developed than almost all of the book's human characters".

Frank McConnell of The Atlanta Journal was critical of Crichton's storytelling and compared the novel to a bowl of Cheerios cereal: "pure product, unsurprising and tasty, but not especially substantial."

== Film adaptation ==
The Lost World: Jurassic Park is a 1997 science fiction film and sequel to Jurassic Park, loosely based on Crichton's novel. The film, which was directed by Steven Spielberg, who also directed the first Jurassic film, was a commercial success, breaking many box-office records when released, but received mixed reviews. It has a number of plot differences from the novel and incorporates scenes from the first novel that were not previously filmed, including a scene with a young girl being attacked by small dinosaurs.
