= Elva Trill =

Irish actress and singer

- Born: 1990 or 1991 (age 34–35); County Sligo, Ireland
- Occupations: Actress, singer

Elva Trill (born 1990 or 1991) is an Irish actress and singer. She is known for Line of Duty (2012) and Starstruck (2021). She is also one of the vocalists of the "indie four piece" band The City and Us.

== Early life ==
Trill was born in County Sligo, and grew up in the town of Ballymote. She "knew from a young age [that] she wanted to be an actress" and, at the age of 12, took part in Saturday sessions at the Gaiety School of Acting.

== Career ==
In her late teens, Trill got a place in The Factory rehearsal studios. In 2012, she played Josephine Marchment in a TV production called Am an Ghátair. She subsequently landed a role on the BBC series Ripper Street, which was being filmed in Dublin.

In addition to appearing in the television drama series Red Rock, she had a part in the horror film Cherry Tree (2015) and Brother (2015) which was filmed in Belgium and Ireland. This included scenes filmed, in late 2015, at the Hellfire Club on Montpelier Hill, County Dublin.

She later secured roles in a number of other productions such as The Hallmark Channel's Royal Matchmaker (2018), Soulsmith (2017), and in Stephen Burke's feature film Maze (2017).

She subsequently landed roles in the TV series Starstruck (2021), The Ghosts of Monday (2021), and Jurassic World Dominion (2022). Following this, Trill played the role of Karen in the 2023 British independent film Wait For Me.

== Filmography ==
| Year | Film | Role | Notes |
|---|---|---|---|
| 2012 | Am an Ghátair | Josephine Brown | Drama-documentary series |
| 2015 | Cherry Tree | Amy | |
| 2015 | Red Rock | Charlene Walters | 2 episodes |
| 2016 | Brother | Trisha Venice | |
| 2016 | Rising/Falling | Megan | |
| 2017 | Line of Duty | Gemma | 3 episodes |
| 2017 | Maze | Young Widow | |
| 2017 | Soulsmith | | |
| 2017–2018 | Striking Out | Gillian | Recurring role |
| 2018 | Royal Matchmaker | Petra Petrovich | Television film |
| 2019 | Animals | Kirsten | |
| 2019 | Brute | Ruth | Short |
| 2020 | Sins of a Werewolf | Mary | |
| 2021 | Another Happy Ever After | Jane Doe | Short |
| 2021 | Starstruck | Michelle | Episode 2.1 |
| 2021 | The Ghosts of Monday | | |
| 2022 | Jurassic World Dominion | Charlotte Lockwood | |
| 2023 | Wait for Me | Karen | |
| 2023 | The Hurler: A Campion's Tale | Ruby Vercetti | |
| 2023 | Northern Lights | Áine | 6 episodes |
