= Josephine Marchment =

Irish female spy in the Irish War of Independence

Josephine Marchment Brown (1891/1892 – 1966), born Mary Josephine McCoy, acted as a spy for the Cork No. 1 Brigade of the Irish Republican Army (IRA) during the Irish War of Independence. She married the IRA intelligence officer Florence O'Donoghue in April 1921, and the couple lived in Cork until their deaths in the mid-1960s.

== Early life ==
Josephine McCoy was the youngest of ten children of Bridget McCoy (née O'Sullivan), from Bonane, County Kerry, and Henry James McCoy, a Royal Irish Constabulary (RIC) officer from Pallaskenry, County Limerick. Born in County Limerick, (Note: While some sources suggest she was born in Kerry, other sources (including the 1901 census record for the McCoy family) list Limerick as the place of birth of Mary Josephine McCoy) she was raised in Cork city.

She moved to Wales in 1910, and married her first husband, Coleridge Marchment (alias Brown), in 1913. She gave birth to their son Reggie in 1913, with a second son, Gerald, arriving in 1915. She returned to Ireland, possibly to Ballinlough in Cork, to "look after her recently widowed father" and obtained a clerical job in Victoria Barracks. Her father died in 1917 and shortly afterwards her husband was killed, during the First World War, at Ypres.

While she had brought her youngest son with her to Ireland, her parents-in-law refused requests to return her eldest son to her. Obliged to sue for custody, she "lost out in the English courts". In an operation, reportedly approved by Michael Collins, (and in return for passing on intelligence from the barracks) members of the Cork IRA kidnapped the boy in Wales and brought him back to Cork. Florence O'Donoghue, an IRA intelligence officer, was involved in this operation, which took place in late 1920. She married O'Donoghue in 1921.

== War of Independence ==
Josephine Marchment worked as a typist in Victoria (latterly Collins) Barracks in Cork. She was later promoted to the head of civilian clerks and typists in the barracks and managed a staff of 25. With access to materials from the office of the British Army commander in Cork, General Peter Strickland, she became one of O'Donoghue's most important intelligence agents. Josephine Marchment Brown took the codename 'G', reputedly after her younger son.

Among the documents intercepted at the barracks was a letter from George Bernard O'Connor (of Rochestown) which reportedly included information on the movements of IRA members in the area. This letter, considered by Florence O'Donoghue to be "clear cut [evidence] of informing", resulted in O'Connor being shot dead by the IRA. Some sources, heavily disputed by others, have "speculated that her espionage may have led to the deaths of some of her neighbours".

While other civilians, suspected of leaking information, were dismissed from their roles at Victoria Barracks, Josephine Marchment Brown continued to work at the barracks until the truce in July 1921.

== Later life ==
Josephine and second her husband, Florence O'Donoghue, lived at Loughlene, Eglantine Park off the Douglas Road in Cork, with their two sons and two daughters, and her two sons from her first marriage.

In her Military Service Pension application, submitted in the name Josephine O'Donoghue in 1939, she lists Seán O'Hegarty and Terence MacSwiney as the "officers commanding" of the IRA unit (Cork No. 1 Brigade) she worked with. The application included references from O'Hegarty, Liam Tobin, Joseph O'Connor and Tom Barry.

She died in 1966. Her husband Florence, who had remained neutral during the Irish Civil War, died in December 1967 at the Mercy Hospital, Cork.

== In fiction ==
A play, written by Gerry White and titled The Soldier and the Spy, is based on the life of Josephine Marchment and Florence O'Donoghue. A plotline in the RTÉ mini-series Resistance is also partly based on Marchment's life. In a 2012 TG4 docu-series, Am an Ghátair, Marchment is played by Elva Trill.
