= Soulsmith (film) =

2017 film directed by Kevin Henry

- Directed by: Kevin Henry
- Written by: Kevin Henry
- Produced by: Kevin Henry; Seamus Waters
- Starring: Matthew O'Brien; Miriam Devitt; Brian Fortune; Conor Marren; Elva Trill; Tommy Canavan; Aoibheann McCann; Richard Keaney; Tristan Heanue
- Cinematography: Stephen C. Walsh
- Edited by: Eoin McDonagh
- Music by: Michael Fleming
- Production company: WHIM Films
- Release date: 1 September 2017
- Running time: 83 minutes
- Country: Ireland
- Language: English

Soulsmith is a 2017 Irish film, directed, written and produced by Kevin Henry.

== Production ==
€2,176 was raised via an Indiegogo campaign. Soulsmith was filmed in Castlebar and Dublin. It was filmed in 2.35:1. Kevin Henry said that "When writing Soulsmith, so much coverage on my generation had been about emigration but I just wanted to focus on those who stayed. And in a more focused sense, Soulsmith tries to take a step back and look at masculinity within my generation".

== Plot ==
Ed Smith is a once-successful playwright now struggling. Then, his father dies, and he goes home to County Mayo.

== Reception ==
The film was shown at the 2017 Cork Film Festival. It won the Best International Feature award at the Austin Revolution Film Festival. It was shown at the Irish Film Institute and received its TV premiere on RTÉ One on 21 December 2018.

On Scannain.com, Dave Higgins gave it 4.0/5, saying "Soulsmith is a movie brimming over with the passion the director clearly has for the story and it's full of wonderful characters and clever writing".
