= Maze (2017 film) =

- British release poster
- Directed by: Stephen Burke
- Screenplay by: Stephen Burke
- Produced by: Brendan J. Byrne; Jane Doolan
- Starring: Tom Vaughan-Lawlor
- Cinematography: David Grennan
- Edited by: John O'Connor
- Release date: 22 September 2017 (Ireland)
- Running time: 92 minutes
- Countries: Ireland; United Kingdom

Maze is a prison film about the Maze Prison escape of 38 Provisional Irish Republican Army (IRA) prisoners in 1983. It was written and directed by Stephen Burke and released on 22 September 2017.

== Cast ==
- Tom Vaughan-Lawlor as Larry Marley
- Barry Ward as Gordon
- Martin McCann as Oscar
- Eileen Walsh as Kate Marley
- Aaron Monahan as Joe
- Niamh McGrady as Jill
- Ross McKinney as Danny Marley
- Elva Trill as Young Widow
- Tim Creed as Brendan 'Bik' McFarlane
- Cillian O'Sullivan as Bobby Storey
- Patrick Buchanan as Gerry Kelly
- Andy Kellegher as Warder Williams
- David Coakley as George
- Will Irvine as Maguire
- Stefan Dunbar as Ken
- James Browne as Craig
- Ella Connolly as Janet
- Michael Power as John Adams
- Robert Fawsitt as Tom
- Seán T. Ó Meallaigh as Michael
- Aiden O'Hare as O'Brien
- Conor Charlton as Eoin
- Stevie Greaney as Prisoner
- Michelle Lehane as Estate Agent
- James Tolcher as Main Gate Guard
- Paul Elliot as Tower Soldier

== Reception ==
The Traditional Unionist Voice party said "After watching the trailer I am deeply concerned that the film is going to show a one-sided, very biased account of the Maze break-out. There is no account at all given in the trailer by the prison officers who served us during the Troubles."

Alex Maskey of Sinn Féin said "At the end of the day a prison escape is of huge human interest worldwide so I have no doubt people will go and watch the film. I would recommend to people, go and watch it and make your judgement - I would hope it wouldn’t glorify anything which is inappropriate.”

The Playlist included it as one of their choices of underrated films of 2017.

The film opened without previews to over €141,000 after its official release on Friday 22 September and was screened in more than 60 cinemas all over the island of Ireland. It set the 2017 record for the biggest opening weekend for an Irish film.
