= List of Jurassic Park (franchise) characters =

Group of fictional characters

Screenshot from Jurassic World Dominion, featuring various recurring characters from the Jurassic Park film series as well as one original character from the 2022 film; from left to right: Dr. Ian Malcolm, Dr. Alan Grant, Dr. Ellie Sattler, Claire Dearing, Owen Grady, Maisie Lockwood, and Kayla Watts.

The following is a list of fictional characters from Michael Crichton's 1990 novel Jurassic Park, its 1995 sequel The Lost World, and their film adaptations, Jurassic Park (1993) and The Lost World: Jurassic Park (1997). Also included are characters from the sequel films Jurassic Park III, Jurassic World, Jurassic World: Fallen Kingdom, Jurassic World Dominion, Jurassic World Rebirth, and the short film Battle at Big Rock. These films are not adaptations and have no original source novels but contain some characters and events based on the fictional universe of Crichton's novels. Some cast members from the films have also reprised their roles in certain video games.

The original novel introduces several characters who would appear throughout the film series, including Dr. Alan Grant, Dr. Ellie Sattler, Dr. Ian Malcolm, John Hammond, and Dr. Henry Wu. Jurassic World introduces Owen Grady and Claire Dearing, while Fallen Kingdom introduces Maisie Lockwood, who are the lead characters of the Jurassic World trilogy. Rebirth introduces a new cast, notably Zora Bennett and Dr. Henry Loomis, both of whom are set to return in the sequel.

== Cast table ==
List indicators
- This table shows the characters and the actors who have portrayed them throughout the franchise.
- A dark grey cell indicates the character was not in the film.
- A ^{V} indicates a voice-only role.
- A ^{C} indicates a cameo appearance.

Character	Jurassic Park trilogy			Jurassic World trilogy			Standalone sequel	Short film
Character	Jurassic Park	The Lost World: Jurassic Park	Jurassic Park III	Jurassic World	Jurassic World: Fallen Kingdom	Jurassic World Dominion	Jurassic World Rebirth	Battle at Big Rock
Character	1993	1997	2001	2015	2018	2022	2025	2019
Cast
Dr. Alan Grant	Sam Neill		Sam Neill			Sam Neill		
Dr. Ellie Sattler	Laura Dern		Laura Dern^{C}			Laura Dern		
Dr. Ian Malcolm	Jeff Goldblum	Jeff Goldblum		Jeff Goldblum^{P}	Jeff Goldblum^{C}	Jeff Goldblum		
John Hammond	Richard Attenborough	Richard Attenborough			Richard Attenborough^{P}			
Lex Murphy	Ariana Richards	Ariana Richards^{C}						
Tim Murphy	Joseph Mazzello	Joseph Mazzello^{C}						
Dr. Henry Wu	BD Wong			BD Wong	BD Wong	BD Wong		
Dennis Nedry	Wayne Knight							
Lewis Dodgson	Cameron Thor					Campbell Scott		
Mr. DNA	Greg Burson^{V}			Colin Trevorrow^{V}				
Robert Muldoon	Bob Peck							
Donald Gennaro	Martin Ferrero							
Ray Arnold	Samuel L. Jackson							
Dr. Harding	Jerry Molen							
Dr. Sarah Harding		Julianne Moore						
Kelly Curtis		Vanessa Lee Chester						
Nick Van Owen		Vince Vaughn						
Eddie Carr		Richard Schiff						
Roland Tembo		Pete Postlethwaite						
Peter Ludlow		Arliss Howard						
Ajay Sidhu		Harvey Jason						
Dr. Robert Burke		Thomas F. Duffy						
Dieter Stark		Peter Stormare						
Paul Kirby			William H. Macy					
Amanda Kirby			Téa Leoni					
Billy Brennan			Alessandro Nivola					
Eric Kirby			Trevor Morgan					
Udesky			Michael Jeter					
Nash			Bruce A. Young					
Cooper			John Diehl					
Ben Hildebrand			Mark Harelik					
Owen Grady				Chris Pratt	Chris Pratt	Chris Pratt		
Claire Dearing				Bryce Dallas Howard	Bryce Dallas Howard	Bryce Dallas Howard		
Gray Mitchell				Ty Simpkins				
Zach Mitchell				Nick Robinson				
Simon Masrani				Irrfan Khan				
Vic Hoskins				Vincent D'Onofrio				
Barry Sembène				Omar Sy		Omar Sy		
Lowery				Jake Johnson		Jake Johnson^{P}		
Vivian				Lauren Lapkus		Lauren Lapkus^{P}		
Karen Mitchell				Judy Greer				
Scott Mitchell				Andy Buckley				
Zara				Katie McGrath				
Franklin Webb					Justice Smith	Justice Smith		
Dr. Zia Rodriguez					Daniella Pineda	Daniella Pineda^{C}		
Maisie Lockwood					Isabella Sermon	Isabella Sermon		
Charlotte Lockwood					Isabella Sermon^{P}	Isabella Sermon Elva Trill^{O}		
Iris					Geraldine Chaplin	Geraldine Chaplin^{P}		
Sir Benjamin Lockwood					James Cromwell			
Eli Mills					Rafe Spall			
Ken Wheatley					Ted Levine			
Mr. Eversoll					Toby Jones			
Ramsay Cole						Mamoudou Athie		
Kayla Watts						DeWanda Wise		
Soyona Santos						Dichen Lachman		
Rainn Delacourt						Scott Haze		
Zora Bennett							Scarlett Johansson	
Dr. Henry Loomis							Jonathan Bailey	
Duncan Kincaid							Mahershala Ali	
Martin Krebs							Rupert Friend	
Reuben Delgado							Manuel Garcia-Rulfo	
Teresa Delgado							Luna Blaise	
Xavier Dobbs							David Iacono	
Isabella Delgado							Audrina Miranda	
LeClerc							Bechir Sylvain	
Nina							Philippine Velge	
Bobby Atwater							Ed Skrein	
Dennis								André Holland
Mariana								Natalie Martinez
Kadasha								Melody Hurd
Mateo								Pierson Salvador
Greg								Chris Finlayson
Dennis & Mariana's baby son								Noah and Ethan Cole

== Appearing in Jurassic Park ==
Jurassic Park began as a science fiction novel, written by Michael Crichton and published in 1990. Steven Spielberg directed a film adaptation released in 1993. In both versions, John Hammond and his company InGen are building Jurassic Park, a theme park of genetically engineered dinosaurs. It is located on the fictional island of Isla Nublar, near Costa Rica. When a worker is killed in a dinosaur attack, the park's investors demand that Hammond bring experts to the island to certify its safety. Hammond invites paleontologist Alan Grant and paleobotanist Ellie Sattler, and also brings along his own grandchildren, Lex and Tim Murphy. Lawyer Donald Gennaro, representing Hammond's investors, invites mathematician Ian Malcolm. Using chaos theory, Malcolm strongly believes that the park is destined to fail, an idea with which Hammond disagrees. Meanwhile, the park's disgruntled computer programmer, Dennis Nedry, is bribed by a rival corporation to steal dinosaur embryos from Jurassic Park. To do so, he temporarily shuts down certain security features, which leads to a series of incidents proving Malcolm right. The group then work together to restore order and get off the island. The film adaptation omits certain characters, such as park publicist Ed Regis, and condenses the roles of others such as geneticist Henry Wu and veterinarian Dr. Harding.

=== Dr. Alan Grant ===
- Appears in: Jurassic Park (novel and film), Jurassic Park III, and Jurassic World Dominion
- Portrayed by: Sam Neill

Dr. Alan Grant is a paleontologist and the main protagonist in the first novel, as well as the first and third films. Crichton based Grant on paleontologist Jack Horner. Grant's research is partly focused on velociraptors. When the dinosaurs on Isla Nublar escape their enclosures, Grant becomes stranded in the park with Hammond's two grandchildren. Throughout a large portion of the book, Grant and the children explore the park trying to find their way back to the rest of the group. In the film adaptation, much of this period is omitted.

For the film, several actors were considered for the part before it went to Neill, becoming one of his most popular roles. The film portrays Grant differently than the novel, giving him an introverted personality and a dislike of children. However, over the course of the first film, he warms to Hammond's grandchildren. The film also depicts him in a relationship with Dr. Ellie Sattler, who is a student of his in the novel. They have broken up by the time that Jurassic Park III takes place. In the third film, Grant has continued his fossil research and reluctantly agrees to give an aerial tour of the dinosaurs on Isla Sorna, in exchange for dig-site financing. He and others become stranded on the island, and Grant realizes that his new theories about raptor intelligence are correct. He eventually escapes Isla Sorna.

In Jurassic World Dominion, Grant reunites with Sattler and Malcolm to investigate the giant locusts that Biosyn created. They also rescue Maisie from Biosyn. After Henry Wu helps out the humans in stopping the locust infestation, Grant rekindles his relationship with Sattler while planning to join Ian and Ramsay Cole in testifying against Biosyn.

=== Dr. Ellie Sattler ===
- Appears in: Jurassic Park (novel and film), Jurassic Park III, and Jurassic World Dominion
- Portrayed by: Laura Dern

Dr. Ellie Sattler is a paleobotanist who, in the novel, is a graduate student studying under Dr. Alan Grant. In the film adaptation, they are a couple, and she has a more prominent role. Sattler is one of Dern's most popular film roles. She briefly appears in Jurassic Park III, in which she and Grant have broken up, although they remain close friends. She is married to Mark, an employee of the U.S. State Department, and they have two young children. An early draft had featured Grant and Sattler as a couple in the process of splitting up.

In Jurassic World Dominion, she once again has a prominent role and is revealed to have divorced Mark by this point. She reunites with Grant and Malcolm to investigate the giant locusts that Biosyn created. They also rescue Maisie from Biosyn. After Henry Wu helps out the humans in stopping the locust infestation, Sattler rekindles her relationship with Grant while planning to join Ian and Ramsay Cole in testifying against Biosyn.

=== Dr. Ian Malcolm ===
- Appears in: Jurassic Park (novel and film), The Lost World (novel and film), Jurassic World: Fallen Kingdom, and Jurassic World Dominion
- Portrayed by: Jeff Goldblum

Dr. Ian Malcolm is a mathematician who specializes in chaos theory. His character is based on Ivar Ekeland and James Gleick. (Note: Jurassic 400) Malcolm's all-black clothing style reflects that of Heinz-Otto Peitgen, a mathematician who wrote a richly illustrated book on fractals. According to Crichton, Malcolm's character functions as the "ironic commentator inside the story who talks about the action as it takes place".

Throughout the novel and film adaptation, Malcolm makes predictions based on chaos theory about the consequences and ultimate failure of attempting to control nature, which often turn out to be correct. Malcolm is seriously injured during a Tyrannosaurus attack and is brought back to the Visitor Center. Although he is declared dead at the end of the novel, he explains in the sequel, The Lost World, that this declaration was premature.

Malcolm is the main protagonist of The Lost World, in which he and others travel to Isla Sorna to conduct research about dinosaur extinction. He is also the main protagonist of the film adaptation, titled The Lost World: Jurassic Park. Like the novel, Malcolm travels to Isla Sorna, but for a different reason; his girlfriend, paleontologist Sarah Harding, has already gone there to document the island's dinosaurs, and he reluctantly goes to retrieve her. In the film series, Malcolm has several children; one of them, Kelly Curtis, appears in The Lost World: Jurassic Park.

Malcolm has brief appearances in the 2018 film Jurassic World: Fallen Kingdom, in which he advises against the rescue of the last surviving dinosaurs, which are threatened by an impending volcanic eruption on Isla Nublar. Later, when the dinosaurs are dispersed globally, Malcolm reluctantly states that humans must now co-exist with them.

Malcolm returns for a larger role in the 2022 film Jurassic World Dominion, in which he now works for Biosyn as an in-house philosopher. He uses his position to help Alan Grant and Ellie Sattler in exposing the company's locust scheme.

=== John Hammond ===
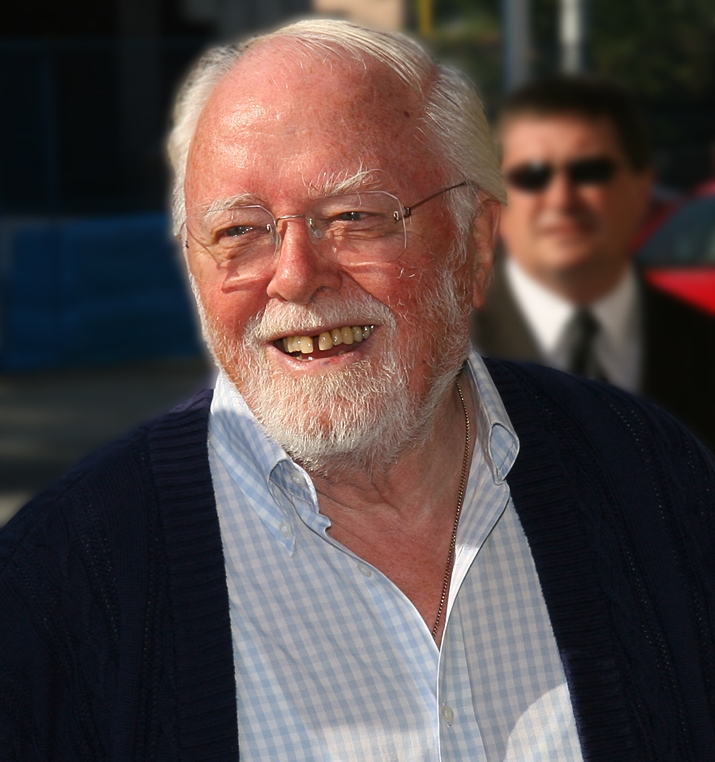
Spielberg enlisted fellow director Richard Attenborough to play John Hammond, the park's creator.

- Appears in: Jurassic Park (novel and film), The Lost World (film), Jurassic World (statue), Jurassic World: Fallen Kingdom (painting)
- Portrayed by: Richard Attenborough

John Hammond is the wealthy owner of Jurassic Park and founder of InGen. He is also the grandfather to Lex and Tim Murphy.

His antagonistic traits in the novel were removed for the film adaptation. Although he is not modeled after anyone in particular, Crichton explained that Hammond is like the "dark side of Walt Disney". Director Steven Spielberg described the film's Hammond as "a cross between Walt Disney and Ross Perot". Attenborough was initially hesitant to accept the role, as he had not acted in 14 years and found film directing much easier. He eventually accepted the part after Spielberg pleaded for him to do so, stating "I can't see anyone else playing it but you".

Near the end of the novel, Hammond falls down a hill and breaks his ankle. He is unable to climb back up and is subsequently killed by a pack of Procompsognathus. The personality of the film's Hammond is a near opposite to the novel's version, sharing only his eccentricity. Hammond is depicted as a kind, jovial and charismatic capitalist. Unlike the novel, he survives in the film adaptation and makes brief appearances in the second film, in which control of InGen has been taken over by his nephew Peter Ludlow. Hammond opposes Ludlow's plan to take dinosaurs off of Isla Sorna for a new dinosaur park in San Diego, an idea that eventually fails, with Isla Sorna being declared a nature preserve.

Attenborough was to reprise his role for the fourth film, although he suffered a fall at his home in 2008 and subsequently retired from acting. In the fourth film, Jurassic World, Hammond has been deceased for some time. A memorial statue of him is present in the new theme park known as Jurassic World. A viral marketing website for the fictional Masrani Global Corporation was launched to promote the film. According to the website, Hammond died in 1997. Simon Masrani, CEO of the Masrani Corporation and the owner of Jurassic World, is stated to have been entrusted by Hammond to direct the new park and honor Hammond's beliefs.

In Jurassic World: Fallen Kingdom, Hammond is revealed to have been partners with Benjamin Lockwood in the de-extinction of the dinosaurs, until a dispute emerges about using the same technology for human cloning, which Hammond opposes. A painting of Hammond appears in the film.

=== Robert Muldoon ===
- Appears in: Jurassic Park (novel and film)
- Portrayed by: Bob Peck

Robert Muldoon is Jurassic Park's game warden. He is described in the novel as a burly White Kenyan man fifty years of age, with deep blue eyes and a steel gray mustache. In the movie he is portrayed by English actor Bob Peck. He is a former professional hunter who worked with Hammond at one of his previous parks in Kenya. He has experience working with dangerous predators and (unlike most other characters) his attitude toward the dinosaurs is realistic and unromantic. He believes that the Velociraptors should be destroyed, describing them as smart and potentially dangerous. (Note: Jurassic 290) He also recommended that the park be equipped with more military-grade weapons for use in emergencies, but was overruled. He reminds Hammond of this when it dawns on them that they have no way of stopping the escaped T. rex. Muldoon spends most of the novel riding around the park, drinking whiskey and attempting to restore order. He is later attacked by a pack of Velociraptors, but survives by wedging himself into a pipe. He manages to kill a few of them, and eventually escapes the island with the other survivors.

In the film's introduction when a worker is attacked by a Velociraptor that the park staff are transporting, Muldoon gives the order to kill it. He notes that the raptors have tested the perimeter fence in different places, probing for an opening, and comments that the animals "show extreme intelligence. Even problem-solving intelligence". He remains in the control room with Hammond and Arnold, commenting on the many safety and security failures of the park. After the power failure, he drives Ellie to the Tyrannosaurus escape site where they rescue Malcolm. In the jungle during an attempt to restore power, Muldoon prepares to shoot and kill a Velociraptor in the distance, where a second raptor ambushes him from the side while he is focused on the first raptor. Muldoon remarks "Clever girl" as he discovers the trap and is killed by the second raptor. "Clever girl" would go on to become a popular quote among fans.

=== Donald Gennaro ===
- Appears in: Jurassic Park (novel and film)
- Portrayed by: Martin Ferrero

Donald Gennaro is a corporate attorney representing Jurassic Park's investors. He is sent on their behalf to investigate the safety of the park after several reports of missing or dead workers. In the novel, he is described as a short muscular man and represents an "every-man" personality among the characters. Although he is initially worried only about disappointing his supervisors, he soon drops this concern when his life is threatened, focusing on survival instead. When problems begin to occur, he consistently handles them appropriately, accompanying Robert Muldoon on a mission to subdue the Tyrannosaurus and successfully restoring power, despite being ambushed by a Velociraptor. Grant claims that his negative attitude comes from trying to avoid responsibility for his role in creating the park. Near the end of the novel, Gennaro realizes that he is partially responsible for everything occurring when Grant says: "You sold investors on an undertaking you didn't fully understand... You did not check on the activities of a man whom you knew from experience to be a liar, and you permitted that man to screw around with the most dangerous technology in human history". Gennaro then helps Grant in his attempt to wipe out the remaining Velociraptors and their eggs with nerve gas. (Note: Jurassic 384) Although he survives the events on the island, he dies of dysentery sometime after.

For the film, Spielberg condenses the characters Ed Regis and Donald Gennaro and the negative aspects of the novel's Hammond into one character. The result is the creation of a character whose loyalty to his employers and seriousness toward the job they gave him is easily overtaken by his own personal greed. When the scientists criticize Hammond's park for various reasons, Gennaro is the only one left who supports the concept, seeing great profit opportunity in the live dinosaurs. Gennaro's sole negative view of the park is a $20 million lawsuit Hammond is facing from the family of a worker killed by a dinosaur at the start of the film, which becomes a decreased concern when he sees the financial potential of the park. Gennaro is overcome by fear when the electric fence around the Tyrannosaurus paddock fails, and he abandons Tim and Lex. Hiding in a toilet stall, he recites a Hail Mary and is eventually found and eaten by the Tyrannosaurus after she breaks out of her pen.

Gennaro's death in the film is popular among fans, and Ferrero acknowledged that the character was likely his most notable role: "When people recognize me on the street, they pause and then say, 'You were the guy who got eaten on the toilet in Jurassic Park,' So yes, I'm the guy who died on the toilet. [...] I'll take it. It's not that bad". Prior to filming, Ferrero had suggested that his character survive but with a broken leg, swapping places with Ian Malcolm, who instead would be the one to get killed.

=== Dr. Henry Wu ===
- Appears in: Jurassic Park (novel and film), Jurassic World, Jurassic World: Fallen Kingdom, Jurassic World Camp Cretaceous, Jurassic World Dominion, and Jurassic World: Chaos Theory
- Portrayed by: BD Wong
- Voiced by: Greg Chun (Jurassic World Camp Cretaceous and Jurassic World: Chaos Theory)

Dr. Henry Wu is a character in the first novel and film, and returns throughout the Jurassic World trilogy. He is initially the chief geneticist at Jurassic Park and head of the team that created the dinosaurs. In the novel, he is killed by a Velociraptor. He has a greatly reduced role in the film adaptation, but returns in a larger role for the Jurassic World films. Wong believed that his diminished role in the first film was the result of "racial exclusion in Hollywood". Colin Trevorrow and Derek Connolly, the writers of Jurassic World, considered Wu a logical character to return, given his role in recreating dinosaurs.

In Jurassic World, Dr. Wu works as the chief geneticist for the eponymous dinosaur theme park. He has created the genetically modified hybrid dinosaur Indominus Rex, which eventually escapes and wreaks havoc. Wu is later revealed to have been secretly working with InGen Security head Hoskins to create the Indominus as a weapon.

In Jurassic World: Fallen Kingdom, Wu is working for Eli Mills and has created another weaponized hybrid dinosaur, the Indoraptor—a scaled-down version of the Indominus Rex—which escapes during a dinosaur auction, killing several attendees. Wu was knocked out during the conflict and was carried away by one of the fleeing mercenaries.

Wu also appears in the animated television series Jurassic World Camp Cretaceous, which reveals that he had worked on another hybrid known as Scorpios rex. Wu later comes back to the island with Eli Mills' henchmen to get the Indominus rex bone and the laptop with his hybrid research. However, the laptop is destroyed by the campers, later dubbed the Nublar Six, and Wu stops the mercenaries from going after them.

In Jurassic World Dominion, Wu is now under the employ of Biosyn and has engineered hybrid locusts using Cretaceous arthropod DNA for the company. In an extended scene, revealed that his locusts initially engineered to spread genetic modifications on crops to improve them, but Dodgson later decided to use them to eliminate the crops of the company's rivals after the experiments failed. However, the scheme spirals out of control when the insects begin rapidly reproducing, threatening to lead investigators back to Biosyn. Wu now regrets his actions and suggests that Biosyn kidnap human clone Maisie Lockwood and baby Velociraptor Beta, so he can study their altered DNA to spread changes to shorten their lifespan. From this research, Wu is able to eradicate the locust outbreak by releasing one he created with the altered DNA and gain redemption.

In Jurassic World: Chaos Theory season 4, taking place during the latter part of Dominion. Seeking to stop Biosyn's assassin dinosaur program, the Nublar Six discover that Wu is the head scientist and confront him. To their surprise, Wu expresses remorse for his actions and asks for their help in stopping Dodgson. Wu and the Nublar Six work together to destroy all of the data on the project -- which had been intended for training dinosaurs for search and rescue before it was twisted by Dodgson -- and put an end to the weaponization of dinosaurs. It's later mentioned that Sammy and Yaz are working with Wu and are close enough to call him "Henry," something that Darius teases them about.

Wong does not view his character as a villain but rather someone who is "extremely misguided or just in denial" about the consequences of his work.

=== Tim Murphy ===
- Appears in: Jurassic Park (novel and film), The Lost World (film)
- Portrayed by: Joseph Mazzello

Tim Murphy is Lex Murphy's brother and John Hammond's grandson.

In the novel, Tim is described as a bespectacled boy of about eleven who has an interest in dinosaurs and computers. (Note: Jurassic 92) His quick thinking and encyclopedic knowledge of dinosaurs aid the group several times, and he is instrumental in discovering that dinosaurs have escaped the island, as well as regaining the means to warn the mainland. Later, Tim's ingenuity and technical knowledge allow him to navigate the park's computer systems and to reactivate the physical security systems before the Velociraptors gain access to the visitor's lodge. His expertise regarding dinosaurs rivals Grant's, and is superior to that of Dr. Wu, the scientist who created the dinosaurs. Already familiar with his work before they meet, Tim almost immediately strikes up a friendship with Grant, who notes "it's hard not to like someone so interested in dinosaurs". (Note: Jurassic 94) Tim's father does not share his interest in paleontology, so the dinosaur-loving Grant forms an instant bond with Tim during their time in the park.

In The Lost World, Tim is only mentioned by Ed James as starting college.

In Spielberg's film, Tim and Lex's ages are swapped and some aspects of his personality and role in the story are given to Lex. Tim is still the child interested in dinosaurs, but all of his computer knowledge is given to Lex. This was done so that Spielberg could work specifically with actor Joseph Mazzello, who was younger than Ariana Richards, and to make Lex into a stronger character. Unlike his novel counterpart, Tim does not wear spectacles in the film. Mazzello had previously screen-tested for a role in Spielberg's Hook, but was considered too young. Spielberg promised to cast Mazzello in a future film.

In the novel and film adaptation, Tim and Lex's parents are in the process of getting divorced. Like Lex, Tim also makes a cameo in the second film during Ian Malcolm's visit to John Hammond, happy to see Malcolm again, but staying out of when Ian confronts Ludlow about Isla Nublar as Ian defends them from Ludlow before Hammond's butler ushers them off.

In 2011, Mazzello told Spielberg that he wanted to reprise the role for Jurassic Park IV. Mazzello viewed Tim as "the obvious heir" to Hammond's fortune and Jurassic Park, and hoped that "someday we'll figure out" what happened to Tim after the events of the first film: "Would this experience have turned him away from dinosaurs and make him hate dinosaurs as a thing he once truly loved? Would it be that he wants to be the one to step in and run the park the way it always should have been run?"

=== Lex Murphy ===
- Appears in: Jurassic Park (novel and film), The Lost World (film)
- Portrayed by: Ariana Richards

Alexis "Lex" Murphy is Tim Murphy's sister and John Hammond's granddaughter.

In the novel, Lex is described as seven or eight years old, relatively outgoing, blonde and "a sporty young girl who loves baseball". (Note: Jurassic 92) She wears a baseball glove slung over her shoulder and a baseball cap just about everywhere. Lex is shown to have the traits of a stereotypical child that often complains. Her behavior often annoys the people around her and puts her and the group in danger. Throughout the novel, she shows characteristics of Hammond, such as being careless and unappreciative of the events occurring around her, though not evil. In The Lost World, her character is said to be starting college-preparatory school.

In Spielberg's 1993 film, Lex is the older of the two siblings, aged 12–14, and has a personality similar to her brother's from the novel. In the film, Lex has advanced computer skills that help the survivors escape a pack of Velociraptors. While initially frightened by many of the dinosaurs, Lex eventually gains courage and is instrumental in rebooting the park's systems. Lex's character was strengthened, like Ellie Sattler, to add strong female roles to the film. Richards was happy with the sibling age swap, as she found the novel version of Lex to be an "annoying brat". In auditioning for the role, Richards said: "I was called into a casting office, and they just wanted me to scream. I heard later on that Steven had watched a few girls on tape that day, and I was the only one who ended up waking his sleeping wife on the couch, and she came running through the hallway to see if the kids were all right". Spielberg was also impressed by her role in the 1992 film Timescape. Richards performed most of her own stunts in Jurassic Park. Christina Ricci was among those who had auditioned for the role.

Lex makes a cameo in the second film when Ian Malcolm comes to visit Hammond. She briefly listens to Malcolm as he argues with Ludlow regarding what happened on Isla Nublar, defending her and Tim when Ludlow tries to drag them into the argument, before Hammond's butler ushers them off.

The character has not returned and has not been mentioned in subsequent films. An early draft of Jurassic Park IV featured Lex in a small role, with Keira Knightley in consideration to play the part. Richards was not asked to reprise her role for the Jurassic World films, but remained open to eventually returning.

=== John Arnold/Ray Arnold ===
- Appears in: Jurassic Park (novel and film)
- Portrayed by: Samuel L. Jackson

John Arnold is Jurassic Park's chief engineer, running the main control center from the Visitor Center. He is described as a thin chain-smoker and chronic worrier. A gifted systems engineer, Arnold had designed weapons for the U.S. military, and later worked at several theme parks and zoos before joining the Jurassic Park team. He is a grudgingly optimistic man, who maintains total faith in the computer systems and continues to believe that despite the setbacks, things will eventually work out. When Dennis Nedry locks them out of the system, Arnold, after much persuasion by Donald Gennaro, shuts off all power to the park and resets the computer-control systems. After turning the power back on, he believes the problem has been solved, when it has actually been made worse. The reset has left the park running only on auxiliary power and disabled the electric fences around the dinosaur paddocks, allowing the creatures to break free. Upon realizing his mistake, Arnold volunteers to go to the power plant and restart the main generator; before he can accomplish this task, he is killed by an escaped Velociraptor.

In Spielberg's 1993 film, Arnold is referred to as "Ray", instead of John, to distinguish him from John Hammond. However, in a deleted scene from the second film, he is mentioned as "John Arnold". In the film, Arnold has a smaller role than in the novel but retains the same personality and outlook, often prefacing a risky action with the comment, "Hold on to your butts". Arnold's death is not shown on camera, but is confirmed when his severed arm falls onto Ellie's shoulder in the power shed.

Arnold's line "Hold on to your butts" has become a popular quote. The film's writer, David Koepp, had been on the set for Death Becomes Her (1992), another film he wrote. That film's director, Robert Zemeckis, said "Hold onto your butts" while reviewing dailies, and Koepp decided to add the line into Jurassic Park. Jackson was intended to film a lengthy death scene in Hawaii, in which his character is chased and killed by raptors, but the set for this scene was destroyed by Hurricane Iniki.

=== Dennis Nedry ===
- Appears in: Jurassic Park (novel and film)
- Portrayed by: Wayne Knight

Dennis Nedry is one of the main human antagonists in the novel and film. In the novel, he is described as an obese, messy and an increasingly obnoxious computer scientist. Nedry works for Hammond as the system's programmer and is in charge of networking Jurassic Park's computers. Although he was not given any details about InGen's operation, Nedry was expected to fix numerous bugs and issues without understanding the ultimate goal. After InGen requires him to make changes to the system without further payment, he strikes a deal with Dr. Dodgson of Biosyn to steal embryos of the park's 15 dinosaur species. Nedry is promised $50,000 for each species he delivers, and an additional $50,000 for each embryo that proves viable, for a maximum payment of $1.5 million. Dodgson provides Nedry with an embryo carrier/cooler disguised as a can of shaving cream. Nedry records their conversation, intending to enclose a copy with the embryos as a reminder of their agreement.

In order to carry out the theft, he shuts down the park's security systems, including several electric fences surrounding select dinosaur paddocks. He plans to steal embryos from a secure lab, drive across the park to hand them off to a Biosyn agent waiting at the dock, and then return to the control room and reactivate the security systems before his absence becomes suspicious. On his way to deliver the embryos, a tropical storm causes him to miss crucial road signs, and he becomes lost in the jungle. He is subsequently blinded and killed by a venomous Dilophosaurus. In the novel, his body is later found by Muldoon and Gennaro. Nedry's intricate, complex computer knowledge makes him vain and prideful, but later, one of Hammond's grandchildren is able to navigate Nedry's system and restore power to the Visitor Center. (Note: Jurassic 343)

Nedry's role in the film is generally the same as in the novel, with some minor changes to his fate. He crashes his Jeep through a guardrail and runs off the road, then takes shelter in the vehicle after a Dilophosaurus spits venom in his eyes, dropping the shaving cream container as a result. The animal rears up in the passenger seat, after which the camera cuts to a long shot of the Jeep shaking to the sound of Nedry's screams. His body and the container are not found by anyone, the latter rolling down a hill and becoming buried in mud. In the second film, Nedry's death is not mentioned, neither in the general release nor in a deleted scene in which Ludlow mentions the names of deceased victims to InGen's board of directors.

According to the Dinosaur Protection Group promotional website for Jurassic World: Fallen Kingdom, human remains were found in a cleanup operation a year after Nedry's death and identified as those of an employee who "initiated a premeditated attack on the park system", but were deliberately concealed by InGen until events were exposed years later.

In Jurassic World: Camp Cretaceous, while hunting for Blue the Velociraptor, Dr. Dodgson accidentally finds and retrieves the canister containing the embryos that Nedry had stolen for him, commenting that he could have used them 25 years before. In Jurassic World Dominion, when Dodgson's scheme is exposed, he flees and takes the canister with him, only to be killed by three Dilophosaurus in an attack mirroring Nedry's fate.

Knight was cast in the role after Spielberg saw his performance in Basic Instinct (1992). Knight described the film shoot as a "miserable" experience: "I'm sliding down things, I've got mud all over me, I'm soaking wet, I'm 5 billion pounds, I can barely walk. Yeah, I loved it. [laughs]". Nedry's wardrobe in the film is similar to clothing worn by several characters in another Spielberg film, The Goonies (1985), leading to speculation that his attire is a reference to the earlier film.

In Jurassic Park: The Game which is set immediately after the events of the first film, the characters Miles Chadwick and Nima Cruz discover Nedry's body.

In Lego Jurassic World: The Secret Exhibit and Lego Jurassic World: Legend of Isla Nublar, Dennis is revealed to have a nephew named Danny Nedermeyer who makes repeated efforts to sabotage Jurassic World in honor of his uncle. It is also revealed that Dennis was searching for the lost treasure of the pirate Captain No-Beard which was said to be buried somewhere on Isla Nublar.

=== Dr. Gerry Harding ===
- Appears in: Jurassic Park (novel and film), Jurassic Park: The Game
- Portrayed by: Jerry Molen (in the film), Jon Curry (in Jurassic Park: The Game)

Dr. Gerry Harding is Jurassic Park's chief veterinarian. In the novel, he had been the chief of veterinary medicine for the San Diego Zoo, and was the world's leading expert on avian care. He accepted the job at Jurassic Park because he wanted to become famous for writing the first textbook on the care of dinosaurs. When the group first encounters him, he is caring for an ill Stegosaurus. With the help of Ellie, he finds the source of the animal's sickness and is able to treat it. Being the only medical doctor on the island, he treats Malcolm's injuries. He is attacked by a Velociraptor during the assault on the Visitor Center, but ultimately survives his time on the island. It is implied in the second novel that Sarah Harding is his daughter. (Note: Sarah Harding mentions that her father was a veterinarian and bird specialist at the San Diego Zoo.)

He makes a brief appearance in the first film with a sick Triceratops. He is portrayed by the film's producer, Jerry Molen. The character's first name is never mentioned in the novel or the film, although he is referred to as Gerry in The Making of Jurassic Park, which chronicles the film's production.

He appears as one of the main characters in Jurassic Park: The Game, a 2011 film-inspired video game in which he has a daughter named Jess. He is referred to as Dr. Gerry Harding in the game, and is portrayed as being significantly younger than in the film. Sarah Harding is mentioned as his other daughter, something also acknowledged in the 2015 game Lego Jurassic World.

=== Dr. Lewis Dodgson ===
- Appears in: Jurassic Park (novel and film), The Lost World (novel), Jurassic World Dominion, Jurassic World Camp Cretaceous, Jurassic World: Chaos Theory
- Portrayed by: Cameron Thor (Jurassic Park), Campbell Scott (Jurassic World Dominion)
- Voiced by: Adam Harrington (Jurassic World Camp Cretaceous, Jurassic World: Chaos Theory)

Dr. Lewis Dodgson is the main antagonist of both the Jurassic Park novels, and the main antagonist in Jurassic World Dominion as well as an antagonist in Jurassic World: Camp Cretaceous and Jurassic World: Chaos Theory.

In the novels, Dodgson is an ambitious geneticist who is unafraid to make aggressive moves, generally considered unethical, to achieve his goals. He states that he "won't be held back by regulations made for lesser souls". (Note: Lost World 105) Dodgson works for the Biosyn Corporation, a company that rivals Hammond's but has a far spottier scientific reputation. Dodgson is described in the novels as more of a salesman than a scientist, and someone who specializes in both reverse engineering and stealing the work of others. In his past as a graduate student, he had been dismissed by Johns Hopkins University for attempting a gene therapy experiment on human patients without following the proper Food and Drug Administration (FDA) protocols. Notably, in 1986, he recklessly experimented on an untested vaccine against neurotropic viruses on a farm in Chile, which mutated a strain into an airborne disease. However, due to technicalities, Dodgson escaped justice and he remains working at Biosyn. He hopes to get his hands on Hammond's technology in order to create dinosaurs of his own. He and Biosyn seek to clone dinosaurs not as an attraction, but as potential test subjects for laboratory applications. He is portrayed as cold and ruthless, yet patient and practical, preferring to operate in the shadows with no one suspecting him. In the first novel, Dodgson hires Dennis Nedry to steal dinosaur embryos for Biosyn, but the plot fails when Nedry is killed by a Dilophosaurus on his way to deliver the embryos.

In the sequel novel, Dodgson is a much more ambitious, villainous, and antagonistic character. Prior to the novel's events, Dodgson test-marketed a crop of genetically altered potatoes that ended up hospitalizing children after eating them. However, he still manages to evade the law by bribing officials. He takes a team to Isla Sorna in an attempt to collect fertilized dinosaur eggs, during which he tried to murder Sarah Harding. Ignorant of the dangers of these animals, Dodgson and his team are killed, with Dodgson being consumed by an infant Tyrannosaurus after being captured by one of the adults.

Biosyn is not mentioned in the first film, and Dodgson only makes a short appearance when he meets Nedry in San Jose, Costa Rica, and gives him $750,000 and an embryo transfer device disguised as a shaving cream container. Dodgson's brief appearance has inspired a number of fan recreations and musical remixes on YouTube, usually featuring a line from Nedry: "We've got Dodgson here!" For the second film, Dodgson is replaced by the character Peter Ludlow.

In Jurassic World Camp Cretaceous, Dodgson, now the head of research for Biosyn, travels to Isla Nublar to make a deal with Daniel Kon for mind control chips for the dinosaurs. Dodgson seeks to control the dinosaurs and show the world that the problem was Masrani and Hammond rather than the creatures themselves. With the help of Kenji Kon, Dodgson seeks to capture several dinosaurs, including Blue the Velociraptor, but he is nearly killed by a pack of Dilophosaurus before being saved by Daniel. In the process, Dodgson inadvertently stumbles across and retrieves the canister containing the embryos that Nedry had stolen for him twenty-five years before. Pleased with the success of their mission, Dodgson finalizes his deal with Daniel, but Laura Molina, one of his investors, attempts to make off with Dodgson's pack containing Biosyn's entire prospectus and the canister. Kenji manages to stop her and retrieve the pack and Molina is eaten by a pack of Compys. Before departing the island, Dodgson asks for DNA samples from the Nublar dinosaurs as well so that Biosyn can clone their own dinosaurs. However, Mae Turner turns on Mantah Corp and destroys her samples while Kenji and his friends sabotage Mantah Corp's operations, preventing them from completing their deal with Dodgson.

Dodgson returns in Jurassic World: Chaos Theory season 3 which partially runs concurrent with the events of Dominion. Now the CEO of Biosyn Genetics, he partners with Soyona Santos' dinosaur smuggling operation. Dodgson is revealed to secretly be behind the dinosaur black market seen in Dominion as well as an Atrociraptor pack terrorizing a university professor and UN advisor. Dodgson has been working to get Biosyn dominion over all dinosaurs on Earth which the man had opposed. Dodgson advocates killing an Italian Regional Counsellor who is holding up the special land permit for Biosyn Valley, but he seemingly concedes to Santos' argument for intimidation instead. However, Dodgson promptly goes behind her back to hire the Atrociraptor Handler to kill the man anyways. Although infuriated, Santos chooses to keep quiet due to the greater payoff of getting ownership of the market. Dodgson tasks Santos and Brooklynn with capturing Maisie Lockwood and Blue's daughter Beta for him. Brooklynn—who recognizes Dodgson from his dealings with Mantah Corp years before—convinces Santos that he can't be trusted and goes undercover in the market to find out more information on Dodgson's activities. After the black market is destroyed during a raid by French Intelligence, Owen Grady and Claire Dearing (as seen in Dominion), Santos contacts Dodgson for an extraction and he sends her a drone helicopter to take Santos to Biosyn. However, Santos' escape is foiled by Brooklynn, Darius, Ben and Yaz and she is arrested by Barry Sembène and French Intelligence. Following Santos' arrest, Brooklynn, Darius, Ben and Yaz take Santos' escape helicopter to Biosyn to stop Dodgson once and for all while their friends Kenji and Sammy—the same group who had stopped Dodgson's plans with Mantah Corp—make their way to Biosyn to rescue the Ankylosaurus Bumpy.

In season 4, Kenji blackmails Dodgson by threatening to expose his crimes to the media to get him to lead Kenji and Sammy to Bumpy. In a rare moment of open honesty, Dodgson explains to Kenji that he sees his work as a scientific Fountain of Youth aimed at bettering the world. Although Dodgson's innovations have made things better in smaller ways -- which includes a deal with Sammy's family ranch -- no matter how big or small the innovation is, it's never enough for Dodgson who sneers at people like Kenji who Dodgson sees as attacking him for the few mistakes he's made on the road to greatness simply because Dodgson has the audacity to have vision. Dodgson betrays the two in an attempt to get rid of them rather than actually leading Kenji and Sammy to Bumpy. At the same time, the others sneak into Biosyn and confront a remorseful Henry Wu. Wu explains that he had intended to train the dinosaurs for search and rescue, but Dodgson had twisted his research to create the assassin dinosaurs. With the help of Wu, the Nublar Six destroy Biosyn's research into weaponizing dinosaurs, putting an end to it. While trying to escape from Biosyn, Darius sees Dodgson boarding a hyperloop on a security camera. Shortly thereafter, the power goes out, and Dodgson is devoured by a Dilophosaurus pack that had entered the hyperloop tunnel in pursuit of Ben and Kenji.

In Dominion, Dodgson has worked his way up to become CEO of Biosyn Genetics. With dinosaurs now roaming among humans, Dodgson led Biosyn in capturing dinosaurs and placing them in a sanctuary at the company's headquarters in Italy's Dolomites mountain range. The company conducts research on the dinosaurs to potentially advance medical research. Dodgson has also taken to keeping the shaving cream canister that he gave to Nedry in his office on his trophy shelf.

In the film, it brings Dodgson closer to his literary counterpart from Michael Crichton's novel The Lost World as a murderous white-collar criminal, as he attempts to kill the protagonists who try to stop him, and human remains were found under his facility in abandoned mines nested by Dimetrodons. He is publicly seen as an awkward but inspiring leader with his appeal helping Biosyn recruit several idealistic young people under his employ. However, he is secretly still nefarious and business-minded, having hired Henry Wu to engineer a breed of transgenic locusts that consume the crops of rival companies and Soyona Santos to serve as a criminal liaison to the black markets and for other off-the-books activities. In an extended scene, revealed that the locusts initially designed to spread genetic modifications on crops to give them defenses against diseases, harsh climates, and pests. After the experiments failed, instead of destroying the locusts, Dodgson decided to use them to eliminate rival crops.

Alan Grant and Ellie Sattler arrive at Biosyn's headquarters to investigate the company's connection with the locusts, which are stored in a room at the facility. Dodgson fires Ian Malcolm, the company's in-house philosopher, after learning that he helped Grant and Sattler in their investigation. He sets the insects on fire to destroy evidence, but they break free and set the surrounding forest on fire, burning the facility and further exposing him. Before leaving Biosyn, Malcolm exposes Dodgson's actions to his employees. While preparing to flee, Dodgson assures his close aide, Ramsay Cole, that they can rebuild. He is stunned to learn that Ramsay has also been working to expose him. Dodgson flees through Biosyn's hyperloop, taking the canister with him, although he is killed by three Dilophosaurus, just like Nedry, after Ellie and Claire Dearing cut power to the hyperloop. After his death, Dodgson's reputation is posthumously ruined by the revelation of his crimes and his company is at risk of going to defunct, starting with the United Nations taking over the protection rights of the dinosaurs from Biosyn.

In 2013, Thor expressed enthusiasm in reprising the role, if asked to return, but he was convicted of sexual assault in 2015 and sentenced to six years in prison. In Dominion, Campbell Scott took over the role. Director and co-writer Colin Trevorrow was interested in bringing the character back after his brief appearance in Jurassic Park. In the years after the first film, Trevorrow envisioned Dodgson as having worked his way up to become CEO of Biosyn. He described Dodgson as someone who "is a mentor to others and yet is betraying all of them by betraying their values". To prepare for the role, Scott watched the previous Jurassic Park films and also read Crichton's novels, as he wanted to incorporate elements of Crichton's character into the film. He found that the books sometimes portray Dodgson as "just a plain sociopath", which he wanted to avoid in Dominion, stating, "It's much more interesting to play a sociopath who has a lot of depth and has interesting intentions behind their actions". Speaking about his role in Dominion, Scott said that Dodgson "will do anything to get people out of his way, or on his side, depending on who he meets".

=== Mr. DNA ===
- Appears in: Jurassic Park (film), Jurassic World, and Jurassic World Camp Cretaceous
- Voiced by: Greg Burson (Jurassic Park), Colin Trevorrow (Jurassic World), Jeff Bergman (Jurassic World Camp Cretaceous)

Mr. DNA is a cartoon character that resembles an anthropomorphic DNA helix with a face and arms. He is the mascot for InGen and the theme parks Jurassic Park and Jurassic World. Most of his lines and explanations are said by Henry Wu in the novel during a tour of the genetics lab, some of which is still given to the cameo Wu makes in the original film.

In Jurassic Park, Mr. DNA appears in videos to help visitors understand the processes involved in the creation of the dinosaurs at Jurassic Park (the character itself was created for the film for virtually the same reasons, to provide exposition for the film's audience). A video starring him and InGen's founder John Hammond is played in a theater located in the park's Visitor Center before a tour. For the film adaptation, Spielberg and writer David Koepp had faced difficulty in explaining the novel's scientific elements, until Spielberg devised the idea of an animated character who would inform the audience and characters. Koepp believed the idea went well with the theme park setting. Bob Kurtz developed the animation sequence. Mr. DNA became a popular character among fans.

In the Super NES version of the Jurassic Park video game, Mr. DNA appears onscreen and offers the player dinosaur trivia.

In the 2011 video game Jurassic Park: The Game by Telltale Games, Mr. DNA is visible on the maintenance board of Jurassic Park's geothermal power plant and on a board indicating how tall a person must be to ride the upcoming Bone Shaker roller coaster.

In Jurassic World, Mr. DNA was used by the Masrani Global Corporation for their new dinosaur park Jurassic World which became an improvement of Jurassic World. Visitors encounter him in the Innovation Center where he explains the basics of genetics and how the dinosaurs were recreated. The character's original voice actor Greg Burson died in 2008. Jurassic World director Colin Trevorrow provided the voice for the new film and said "it actually happened by mistake – I did it once in a booth, we were at a sound mix studio and I just [threw] it in there and we decided to keep it". Some effects were used to alter Trevorrow's voice, making him sound like Burson.

In the 2015 video game Lego Jurassic World, Mr. DNA is a playable character and also appears throughout the game to give hints to the player(s) on how to progress through the levels. As with the original Jurassic Park video game, he also offers the player(s) dinosaur trivia. He is aware of InGen's political dealings and will inform the player of them, yet always presents such in a positive way.

Mr. DNA also appears in the first season and the interactive special of Jurassic World Camp Cretaceous, voiced by Jeff Bergman.

=== Ed Regis ===
- Appears in: Jurassic Park (novel)

Ed Regis is a publicist for InGen and the head of public relations for Jurassic Park. Regis is often given odd jobs by Hammond that are outside his area of expertise, such as escorting a wounded worker to a Costa Rican hospital, and acting as a babysitter for Lex and Tim during their visit to the park. Despite being overconfident about the park and almost negligent about the accidents that have been occurring, fear quickly overtakes him as things begin to go wrong, since he had already witnessed the brutality of dinosaur attacks. When the Tyrannosaurus breaks free of its pen, he abandons the tour vehicle, leaving Tim and Lex behind. After hiding between some boulders, he tries to make his way back to the cars, but is killed by a juvenile Tyrannosaurus. His severed leg is later discovered by Gennaro and Muldoon as they investigate the attack.

Ed Regis's character is written out of the film, although certain aspects of his character such as his nervousness and cowardice are given to the film's version of Donald Gennaro. Gennaro's death sequence during the T. rex attack in the film is reminiscent of Regis's death.

=== Dr. Marty Gutierrez ===
- Appears in: Jurassic Park (novel), The Lost World (novel)

Dr. Marty Gutierrez is an American biologist who lives in Costa Rica. He plays an expository role in both novels. In the first novel, he identifies an unknown lizard that attacks a little girl as Basiliscus amoratus. He is initially unhappy with this identification because the lizard was more venomous than expected and had three toes. He searches the beach where she was attacked and finds the corpse of a similar lizard in the mouth of a howler monkey; he promptly sends the body for laboratory analysis. He also appears at the end of the novel, when the survivors are being held back for questioning by the Costa Rican government. He tells Dr. Grant that the survivors, with the exception of the children, will not be leaving any time soon.

In the second novel, he befriends and shows Richard Levine the desiccated corpse of an unknown creature, oddly similar to the ones found prior to the Jurassic Park incident. He informs Levine that no one knows where these creatures are coming from, and the two argue about whether or not these are dinosaur remains. Gutierrez misidentifies the carcass while Levine identifies it as an Ornitholestes.

Gutierrez is the only character to appear in both novels but none of the films.

== Appearing in The Lost World ==
Crichton wrote a sequel novel, The Lost World, which was published in 1995. Spielberg returned to direct a film adaptation, released as The Lost World: Jurassic Park in 1997. In both the novel and film, two teams travel to Isla Sorna, a second island of dinosaurs that served as the breeding site before moving the animals to Isla Nublar. While one team intends to observe the dinosaurs, the other attempts to take them off the island and exploit them for profit. Like its predecessor, the film adaptation omits certain characters while adding new ones.

=== Dr. Sarah Harding ===
- Appears in: The Lost World (novel and film)
- Portrayed by: Julianne Moore

In the novel, Dr. Sarah Harding is an ethologist who specializes in African predators. She is depicted as dark-haired and muscular. She is intelligent, feisty and rugged, and employs common sense and practicality in dangerous situations, putting the safety of her colleagues first. Her calm personality permits her to quickly take command of the group and devise ways for them to survive and escape Isla Sorna. She and Dr. Ian Malcolm were in a relationship for a period, and at one point she claimed she was in love with him. The relationship did not work out, although they remained close friends. She is idolized by Kelly Curtis who sees her as tough and smart. In the novel, she mentions that her father was a veterinarian and bird specialist at the San Diego Zoo, implying that Dr. Harding is her father. She rides a motorcycle on several occasions, including an instance where she is being chased by raptors.

Harding travels to Isla Sorna with Lewis Dodgson and his group, believing them to be friends of Malcolm. As they approach the island, Dodgson throws Harding overboard to avoid possible interference in his plan to steal dinosaur eggs. Later, Harding and Dodgson take cover from a Tyrannosaurus under an SUV, and she pushes him out to be snatched by the dinosaur.

In the film, Harding's character is merged with that of Richard Levine's. She is intelligent and feisty as well as kind and jolly, but impulsive and too eager to interact with the animals, often placing herself and others in danger. As well, her character is a behavioral paleontologist rather than just an animal behaviorist, who specializes in dinosaur parenting behavior. Her relationship with Malcolm is more in-depth, as they had gotten together after the events of the first film and remain together throughout the second. She is shown to be compassionate towards the dinosaurs, in such situations as petting a baby Stegosaurus, freeing dinosaurs from InGen, and casting a baby T. rex's broken leg

Moore was not asked to return for any sequels, but she expressed an interest in reprising the role.

=== Roland Tembo ===
- Appears in: The Lost World (film)
- Portrayed by: Pete Postlethwaite

Roland Tembo is a hunter hired by InGen to lead its expedition on Isla Sorna. His primary motivation for going to the island is so he and Ajay Sidhu, his hunting partner and close friend, can hunt the ultimate trophy, a male Tyrannosaurus. Although he gets his prize in the end, he is devastated by the death of Ajay. When Ludlow offers him a job at the planned Jurassic Park attraction in San Diego, he declines by saying: "I believe I've spent enough time in the company of death". Without hesitation, Roland leaves the island by helicopter.

David Koepp, the film's writer, chose the name Roland as a reference to one of his favorite songs, "Roland the Headless Thompson Gunner", by Warren Zevon. Spielberg wanted to work with Postlethwaite after seeing his performance in the 1993 film In the Name of the Father. Postlethwaite described Roland as an "ambivalent" character rather than a villain, noting that he "has a sort of mind change before the end and realizes that what Ludlow is up to is not particularly wholesome".

=== Peter Ludlow ===
- Appears in: The Lost World (film)
- Portrayed by: Arliss Howard

Peter Ludlow is the main antagonist of the second film, John Hammond's nephew, and the newly elected CEO of InGen. He attained this position after convincing InGen's board of directors to oust Hammond following an accident on Isla Sorna, in which a group of Compsognathus attacked a girl who was visiting the island with her family. Ludlow is also directly responsible for tarnishing Ian Malcolm's reputation, through outright bribes to Costa Rican officials and misinformation to the press, when Malcolm tries to expose InGen's cover-up of the Jurassic Park incident. His character is ruthless, selfish, greedy and condescending toward those who work for him or those he dislikes. As a result, he is not well respected by the members of his team who instead choose to follow Roland Tembo or Nick Van Owen. In an attempt to revitalize Hammond's original Jurassic Park attraction in San Diego, Ludlow assembles an InGen team to recover Isla Sorna's dinosaurs and move them to the original park. But Ludlow only manages to bring back the male T. rex and his infant, with disastrous results leading to his own demise as the adult T. rex wreaks havoc on San Diego.

Ludlow takes the place of Lewis Dodgson, the main antagonist of the novel. Ludlow's death mirrors that of Dodgson. While trying to recapture the infant in the hold of an InGen cargo ship, he is confronted and captured by the adult and then fed to the infant.

Whereas Hammond had learned from his mistakes in the first film, Ludlow remains out of touch with reality, failing to understand that a dinosaur theme park simply doesn't work and sees only the money in the dinosaurs.

=== Nick Van Owen ===
- Appears in: The Lost World (film)
- Portrayed by: Vince Vaughn

Nick Van Owen is a video documentarian and member of Malcolm's expedition to Isla Sorna. He is an experienced field photographer who has covered wildlife and combat situations, and began volunteering with Greenpeace to meet women. His experience with Greenpeace later spurs him to act in defense of the dinosaurs. He is the only member of his team to be warned by Hammond about InGen's expedition, and sneaks into their camp to release captured animals and disrupt their harvesting operation. He also rescues the infant T. rex from Roland Tembo, leading to a confrontation with its parents which strands both teams on the island. As the teams merge and form an escape plan, Nick easily gains the tacit respect of the rugged InGen men, as in one scene he is shown to effortlessly motivate the men while Peter Ludlow fails. His activist nature conflicts with the hunter style of Roland, and he covertly switches the latter's ammunition to ensure the T. rex adults will not be killed. When the group reaches the island's InGen compound, Nick uses the radio to call for rescue. He leaves on the first evacuation helicopter departing Isla Sorna.

As with Roland, Koepp chose the surname Van Owen as a reference to one of his favorite songs, "Roland the Headless Thompson Gunner", by Warren Zevon. Vaughn was cast after Spielberg saw his performance in an early cut of Swingers, whose filmmakers had asked for Spielberg's permission to use music from his earlier film Jaws.

=== Kelly Curtis ===
- Appears in: The Lost World (novel and film)
- Portrayed by: Vanessa Lee Chester

Kelly Curtis is a close friend of Arby in the novel, and is Dr. Ian Malcolm's daughter in the film. In the novel, Kelly is a 13-year-old girl who is fascinated by science and idolizes Dr. Sarah Harding. Kelly's teacher Richard Levine, aware that he is being followed by Ed James, hires her and Arby as his assistants to run errands for him ahead of his expedition to Isla Sorna. When Kelly learns that Sarah will be on the trip, she and Arby decide to sneak aboard a trailer being transported to the island. While there, Kelly manages to shoot a Velociraptor with a specialized rifle with venom darts, and a second raptor, saving Levine. She later helps Sarah rescue their motorcycle from another raptor and locate a service tunnel, allowing the survivors to escape from the attacking raptors.

The film adaptation portrays her as African-American, a trait shared by Arby, who is omitted from the movie, thereby making the film version of Kelly a composite character. In the film, Kelly was abandoned by her mother after her parents separated, and she has a strained relationship with her father Malcolm. She uses her gymnastics skills to rescue her father from a Velociraptor, by swinging on a pipe and eventually kicking the dinosaur out a window. The gymnastics scene is often criticized.

Chester was cast after director Steven Spielberg met her at the premiere of her 1995 film A Little Princess. The film's writer, David Koepp, initially wrote Kelly as a student of Malcolm's, although Koepp found it difficult to make this idea work. He later suggested that Kelly be written as Ian's daughter, although he and Spielberg initially doubted this due to differing skin colors, but they eventually proceeded with the idea. Chester said: "I was surprised, but I really didn't care. I just thought: Well, I guess I'm an interracial kid in a movie. Just one of those kids out there". Koepp wanted to write an explanation into the script regarding the characters' difference in skin color, but he could not think of a simple way to address it. Jeff Goldblum, who portrays Malcolm, liked "the way it's not even explained and kind of just accepted. We didn't talk about it that much. We know it happens in life". The interracial aspect is only briefly acknowledged when Nick asks Eddie if he sees a family resemblance between the two.

Goldblum briefly returns as Malcolm in Jurassic World: Fallen Kingdom, although there were never any plans to bring Kelly back for the film. Speculating on Malcolm's relationship with Kelly, Goldblum said at the time: "I've imagined that the two of us have become even closer, and I supported all her empowerment and freedom and glorious talents".

=== Dieter Stark ===
- Appears in: The Lost World (film)
- Portrayed by: Peter Stormare

Dieter Stark is Roland Tembo's second-in-command during the InGen team's expedition on Isla Sorna. Dieter expresses dislike for Nick Van Owen and gets into a scuffle with him following Nick's release of the InGen team's captured dinosaurs, who destroyed the team's base camp and communications equipment. He gets lost in the forest while looking for a spot to urinate, and is attacked and killed by a group of Compsognathus, similar to Hammond in the first novel.

=== Ajay Sidhu ===
- Appears in: The Lost World (film)
- Portrayed by: Harvey Jason

Ajay Sidhu is an African hunter of Indian descent who is Roland Tembo's friend and hunting partner. He accompanies Roland during his attempt to capture the T. rex. While he and the InGen team flee from the T. rex to take refuge in a derelict InGen compound in Isla Sorna, the latter enters an elephant grass field, wherein he shouts at them to avoid the place; the team disobeys this warning, after which he follows them in. The group is then killed by Velociraptors hiding in the grass. Ajay's death is not shown on screen, but Roland later confirms it by stating that Ajay "didn't make it".

Six actors were considered for the role. Indian actor M. R. Gopakumar was initially cast as Ajay, but soon had to drop out of the project, because of trouble acquiring a work visa in time for filming.

=== Eddie Carr ===
- Appears in: The Lost World (novel and film)
- Portrayed by: Richard Schiff

Eddie Carr is the key assistant to Doc Thorne. He is added to the team because the vehicles he help designed have not been field-tested. Eddie is frightened by Isla Sorna and wants nothing more than to retrieve Richard Levine and get off the island as soon as possible. Dr. Ian Malcolm does not like that Eddie's life is so heavily influenced by unreliable electronics. When a pack of raptors attack the high hide, they yank him off and kill him, before dragging his body to their nest.

In the novel, he is described as a compact and strong 25-year-old who prefers life in the city. In the film, he has dark brown hair, is balding, and is at least ten years older than the description in the novel, taking on some characteristics of Jack Thorne. In the film, while trying to rescue Ian, Sarah, and Nick, he is ripped in half by two adult T. rex before they push the trailers off the cliff. Malcolm demands that he be given respect for trying to save them.

Schiff had initially auditioned for High Incident, a television series that was executive-produced by Spielberg. After viewing his audition tape, Spielberg decided to cast him in The Lost World. While filming, Spielberg came to like the character so much, he considered keeping him alive for the film. However, Schiff convinced Spielberg to go on with the death scene: "I went, 'Well, no, I think it's better to kill me off, because then all bets are off. If you like my character, then Jeff Goldblum might be next. You never know'".

=== Dr. Robert Burke ===
- Appears in: The Lost World (film)
- Portrayed by: Thomas F. Duffy

Dr. Robert Burke is the InGen team's paleontologist who provides several pieces of incorrect information. During a conversation with Malcolm, Sarah Harding states, "Robert Burke said that the T. rex was a rogue that would abandon its young at the earliest opportunity". Burke's theory is disproved later in the film when adult Tyrannosaurs attack the trailer in which their infant is being held. Burke and others hide behind a waterfall when they are pursued by a Tyrannosaurus, but he is startled when a milk snake slithers down into his shirt. He panics and is subsequently caught and eaten by the T. rex.

Burke is based on the paleontologist Robert Bakker, and Duffy consulted with Bakker to prepare for the role.

=== Dr. Richard Levine ===
- Appears in: The Lost World (novel)

Richard Levine is one of the most brilliant and wealthy paleontologists in the Jurassic Park universe. His wealth comes from a series of dolls produced by a company that he inherited. While researching potential dinosaur sightings, he befriends Dr. Marty Gutierrez and Dr. Ian Malcolm. Levine's egotism and spontaneous personality prove to be a source of constant irritation to the rest of his colleagues, especially Malcolm and Thorne. After being arrested for speeding, Levine is ordered by a judge to teach a junior high school class, where he meets students Arby Benton and Kelly Curtis. Aware that he is being followed by Ed James, Levine hires Arby and Kelly as his assistants to run errands for him ahead of the expedition.

Levine originally intended to travel to Isla Sorna as part of Malcolm's team, but goes there on his own before the Costa Rican government has a chance to destroy the island. When the rest of his team arrives, they find themselves constantly running after him when he decides to continue his research regardless of what is happening around him. He is bitten twice by Procompsognathus, but ultimately escapes the island without major harm.

Levine does not appear in the film adaptation, and some of his traits are instead given to Sarah Harding.

=== Prof. Jack "Doc" Thorne ===
- Appears in: The Lost World (novel)

Prof. Jack "Doc" Thorne is a former university professor of applied engineering from Stanford who specializes in building field equipment, vehicles, and weaponry for field scientists. Thorne is also the boss of Eddie Carr. He exhibits an eclectic mix of character traits, relying on both practical expertise and Eastern philosophy, claiming that one needs to know philosophy and history to succeed in engineering. His company, Thorne Mobile Field Systems, is hired to outfit Richard Levine's expedition to Isla Sorna. Thorne's contribution to Levine's mission includes a large research trailer, nicknamed "The Challenger", an electric SUV, a motor bike, a pair of air rifles with poisonous darts, and a modified satellite phone. When Levine goes missing on the island, Thorne heads to Isla Sorna with Dr. Ian Malcolm and Eddie Carr to rescue him. Thorne saves his colleague multiple times, and survives his time on the island. In the novel, he is depicted as caring for the children Kelly Curtis and Arby Benton.

Thorne is not in the film, although parts of his character are integrated into the roles of Eddie Carr and Roland Tembo.

=== R. B. "Arby" Benton ===
- Appears in: The Lost World (novel)

R. B. "Arby" Benton is an 11-year-old African-American boy who is good friends with Kelly. He is easily frightened, and tends to be quiet and shy, but is very intelligent and an expert with computers. He skipped two school grades and is in seventh grade with Kelly. When Kelly expressed interest in stowing away in the Challenger trailer with him, it was Arby who came up with a plan on how to do so. At one point, he becomes trapped in a predator-proof cage which is pushed away by velociraptors toward their nest. As a result, he suffers lost teeth, and bruises and cuts.

He does not appear in the film adaptation, although Kelly is portrayed in the film as an African American (thereby making her a composite character).

=== Dr. Howard King ===
- Appears in: The Lost World (novel)

Howard King is an assistant to Dr. Lewis Dodgson. Once a successful biologist employed by Biosyn, he lost credibility when his research on blood-coagulation factors failed. Dodgson hired King as his assistant in the reverse-engineering department. He is divorced and has one child, who he sees only on weekends. He accompanies Dodgson to the island, and eventually begins to disagree with Dodgson's dark desires such as the attempted drowning of Sarah Harding. They are separated after being chased by Tyrannosaurs. Eventually, King flees from a pack of raptors in a field of tall grass. A Velociraptor knocks him over and inserts its claws into his back, before biting into his neck and killing him. Other raptors soon join to devour his body.

=== Dr. George Baselton ===
- Appears in: The Lost World (novel)

George Baselton is a biology professor and assistant to Dr. Lewis Dodgson. He is characterized as a "celebrity biologist". As a well known authority and pundit, he is retained by Biosyn and Dodgson to spin any bad press that may arise. When he, Howard King and Dodgson try to steal Tyrannosaurus eggs, the sonic device Dodgson is using to keep the parent Tyrannosaurs at bay becomes unplugged. Dodgson and Baselton stand still, believing a paleontological article which theorized that the dinosaur's vision is based on movement. This turns out to be false, and the Tyrannosaurus eats Baselton alive.

=== Diego ===
- Appears in: The Lost World (novel)

Diego is Dr. Richard Levine's guide on Isla Sorna. He is a young and enthusiastic Costa Rican who visited the island several times as a boy and knows it well. When Levine warns him to be quiet, he simply says that they have nothing to fear. He seems to annoy Levine many times, not only with his insistence that only birds live on the island, but also by disobeying his orders to refrain from using items like cigarettes and making noise. Diego is ambushed and killed by a Carnotaurus while he and Levine watch a Mussaurus in total awe. He has a cousin named Gandoca who takes Dodgson, King, Baselton, and Harding on a boat trip to Isla Sorna.

=== Ed James ===
- Appears in: The Lost World (novel)

Ed James is a private investigator hired by Dr. Lewis Dodgson to get information about Dr. Richard Levine and the survivors of the Isla Nublar incident. He is uncomfortable around Dodgson due to his temper and reputation. After placing a bug in Levine's apartment, he learns the location of Isla Sorna and reports it to Dodgson. He does not accompany either team to the island.

== Appearing in Jurassic Park III ==
These characters only appear in the third film, Jurassic Park III (2001), as there is no third novel. In the film, 12-year-old Eric Kirby goes missing while parasailing near Isla Sorna, also known as Site B. The Costa Rican and U.S. governments decline to search for Eric. His divorced parents, Paul and Amanda Kirby, pose as a wealthy couple and offer to finance Dr. Alan Grant's dig site if he accompanies them to the island and provides an aerial tour of its dinosaurs. In reality, the Kirbys plan to look for their son with Grant's help. The group become stranded and encounter numerous dinosaurs, including a Spinosaurus. The Kirbys' mercenary team is killed, and Grant's graduate student Billy steals Velociraptor eggs to secure funding, putting the survivors at further risk when the raptors begin stalking the group. Grant eventually escapes the island with Billy and the Kirbys.

=== Paul Kirby ===
- Portrayed by: William H. Macy

Paul Kirby is a small-time businessman who is the owner of the hardware store Kirby Paint and Tile Plus. After his son Eric goes missing, Paul enlists the help of Grant under the disguise of being the wealthy owner of Kirby Enterprises and falsely promises to fund the latter's dig site in exchange for an aerial tour of Isla Sorna. When the group is attacked by the Spinosaurus on a river, Paul uses himself as bait so the others can escape.

Director Joe Johnston enjoyed seeing unexpected actors in films: "You could think of a hundred actors who would be more apt to be stuck on an island, trying to survive among man-eating dinosaurs. Bill Macy is not a name and a face that automatically springs to mind, but that's what makes it interesting". Macy had been working with Laura Dern on the 2001 film Focus, and she convinced him to accept the role in Jurassic Park III. Macy originally turned it down due to scheduling conflicts.

=== Amanda Kirby ===
- Portrayed by: Téa Leoni

Amanda Kirby is Paul's former wife who accompanies the search party to Site B to look for Eric and her boyfriend Ben. She frequently ignores Grant's warning to stay quiet and avoid attracting animals. Ben's body is eventually found and she later reconciles with Paul. The group is subsequently cornered by the raptor pack. Amanda, the lone female among the humans, is confronted by a raptor mother and returns the stolen eggs.

Leoni accepted the role after being contacted by Spielberg. Her daughter had recently been ill, although she withheld her emotions to get through the event. After reading the film's script, Leoni felt that she could relate to Amanda Kirby, commenting that the story was about "a woman who had lost her child, albeit in a jungle with dinosaurs. But for me, I wanted to play it out". She had not gotten into physical shape prior to the start of filming, which she described as "a really stupid move on my part. [...] I suffered for it. I was sore and it sucked".

=== Billy Brennan ===
- Portrayed by: Alessandro Nivola

Billy Brennan is a young and enthusiastic graduate student at Grant's dig site. He later accompanies Grant to Isla Sorna. Grant is angry when he learns that Billy has taken raptor eggs, putting the humans at risk. Later, Billy saves Eric from Pteranodons, but becomes separated from the others and is presumed dead. He is rescued by the military, and reunited with Grant on a helicopter.

Nivola believes that the Pteranodon attack was initially meant to be Billy's last appearance in the film, resulting in his character's death. He speculated that his character was brought back at the end of the film because of younger audiences' potential reactions. Nivola criticized the film in 2002: "It was like the only part I've ever done that just had nothing for me to latch on to, character-wise. [...] It was kind of maddening".

=== Eric Kirby ===
- Portrayed by: Trevor Morgan

Eric Kirby is the 12-year-old son of Paul and Amanda who is stranded for nearly eight weeks on Site B, and must fend for himself. He later rescues Grant from velociraptors, and the two bond while on the island.

Spielberg had seen Morgan in The Patriot (2000), and Morgan also knew Jurassic Park III producer Kathleen Kennedy, after working with her on The Sixth Sense (1999).

A series of books written by Scott Ciencin follow Eric's time on Isla Sorna (as well as other related stories) before Grant and the others arrive. These books are Jurassic Park Adventures: Survivor, Jurassic Park Adventures: Prey, and Jurassic Park Adventures: Flyers.

=== Udesky ===
- Portrayed by: Michael Jeter

Mr. Udesky is part of the mercenary team hired by the Kirbys. He describes himself as a booking agent, taking the place of another man who became ill. He is meek but sardonic. The Kirbys took Udesky's advice to consult someone who had been on Isla Sorna before, but they realize later that Grant had only been to Isla Nublar. While on the island, Udesky gets separated from the others. A Velociraptor stabs Udesky's back with its toe claw, immobilizing him in an attempt to lure the other humans out to help him. When this does not work, a raptor kills Udesky by snapping his neck.

=== Cooper ===
- Portrayed by: John Diehl

Cooper is one of the mercenaries hired by the Kirbys. When Grant opposes landing on Isla Sorna, he is knocked unconscious by Cooper. Shortly after landing, the mercenaries encounter the Spinosaurus and flee back to the plane. Cooper is abandoned by his team and snatched up by the dinosaur.

=== Nash ===
- Portrayed by: Bruce A. Young

Nash is the Kirbys' mercenary pilot. He, along with Paul's satellite phone, is consumed by the Spinosaurus shortly after crashing on Site B. Later, when the others hear the phone ringing from within the dinosaur's abdomen, they know the Spinosaurus is nearby. The phone is eventually recovered from a pile of Spinosaurus feces.

=== Mark ===
- Portrayed by: Taylor Nichols

Mark is Ellie's husband who works as a lawyer for the U.S. State Department, and specializes in international relations and treaty law. They have two young children, including Charlie.

An early idea was for Nichols to shoot additional footage for the film's ending, although this was removed as the script went through revisions.

In Jurassic World Dominion, set approximately 20 years after Jurassic Park III, Mark and Ellie are revealed to have divorced.

=== Ben Hildebrand ===
- Portrayed by: Mark Harelik

Ben Hildebrand is Amanda's boyfriend who takes Eric parasailing near Isla Sorna. When the boat crew is killed, Ben saves Eric and himself by disconnecting the parasail from the vessel and gliding onto the island. However, they crash-land in a tree. Although his cause of death is left unexplained, his decomposing corpse is found tangled in his parachute.

=== Enrique Cardoso ===
- Portrayed by: Julio Oscar Mechoso

Enrique Cardoso is the operator of the illegal parasailing service called "Dino-Soar" which brings visitors to sight-see along the coast of Isla Sorna. He is hired to take Ben and Eric to the island; however, Enrique and his boat driver are killed offscreen when they enter a fog bank, causing the vessel to crash and the tourists to become stranded on Site B. His cause of death is not explained in the film.

=== Charlie ===
- Portrayed by: Blake Michael Bryan

Charlie is the three-year-old son of Ellie and Mark, and he has a younger sibling. Grant contacts Ellie while being attacked by the Spinosaurus, but it is Charlie who answers the phone. He is briefly distracted by an episode of Barney & Friends, before taking the phone to Ellie just in time for Grant to get his distress message through.

In Jurassic World Dominion, it is mentioned that Ellie and Mark's children are in college.

== Appearing in Jurassic World ==
These characters are introduced in the fourth film, Jurassic World (2015). In the film, a dinosaur theme park called Jurassic World has operated on Isla Nublar for years. It descends into chaos when a genetically modified hybrid dinosaur, the Indominus rex, escapes its enclosure. Park manager Claire Dearing attempts to stop it with help from Owen Grady, a Navy veteran who is researching Velociraptor intelligence on the island. The two also locate Claire's nephews, Zach and Gray, after they got lost while visiting the island. Jurassic World owner Simon Masrani pilots an armed helicopter and tracks the Indominus. The dinosaur breaks into an aviary, releasing pterosaurs which cause havoc at the park. Masrani is killed when his helicopter collides with the pterosaurs and crashes. Hoskins, the head of security, uses Owen's raptors in a failed mission to take down the Indominus, which is later killed during a battle with several dinosaurs. Owen, Claire, her nephews, and other survivors are evacuated, and the island is abandoned.

=== Owen Grady ===
- Appears in: Jurassic World, Jurassic World: Fallen Kingdom, and Jurassic World Dominion
- Portrayed by: Chris Pratt

Owen Grady is one of the main protagonists of the Jurassic World trilogy. In the first film, he works as an animal behaviorist at Jurassic World, along with his friend Barry Sembène. They have been training four Velociraptors and researching their intelligence for InGen Security, led by Vic Hoskins. Owen opposes Hoskins's long-term goal to use the raptors as military weapons.

Owen was once romantically attracted to Claire Dearing, though their conflicting personalities ended a potential relationship after one date. They rekindle their relationship by the end of the first film, but break up by the time that Jurassic World: Fallen Kingdom takes place. In the latter film, three years have passed and Claire joins a rescue mission to save the Isla Nublar dinosaurs from an impending volcanic eruption. The operation is organized by Sir Benjamin Lockwood, a former partner of John Hammond. Owen has a close connection with Blue, the sole surviving raptor that he raised at Jurassic World, and he reluctantly joins the rescue mission in order to save Blue from the island. Benjamin Lockwood is later killed, and Owen and Claire become adoptive parents to his granddaughter Maisie Lockwood, who is revealed to actually be a clone of his deceased daughter Charlotte.

In Jurassic World Dominion, four years have passed since the events of the previous film. Owen and Claire live in the Sierra Nevada with Maisie, who is kidnapped by Biosyn for research purposes, along with Blue's asexually reproduced baby Beta. Owen and Claire embark on a rescue mission to save them.

Jurassic World director and co-writer Colin Trevorrow had been impressed by Pratt's acting in Zero Dark Thirty. Pratt and Trevorrow described Owen as a combination of Dr. Alan Grant and Dr. Ian Malcolm. Pratt compared his character's relationship with Blue to that of a parent and child.

=== Claire Dearing ===
- Appears in: Jurassic World, Jurassic World: Fallen Kingdom, and Jurassic World Dominion
- Portrayed by: Bryce Dallas Howard

Claire Dearing is one of the main protagonists of the Jurassic World trilogy, alongside her romantic partner Owen. She is initially the park operations manager at the dinosaur theme park Jurassic World, and becomes a dinosaur rights activist in the later films, as well as adoptive mother to Maisie Lockwood.

In Jurassic World, Claire is initially dismissive of Owen's warnings regarding the Indominus. Later, as Owen comforts a dying Apatosaurus that had been attacked by the Indominus, Claire emotionally bonds with it, altering her view of the park's dinosaurs as "assets". Claire later lures the park's Tyrannosaurus into a battle with the Indominus, the latter of whom is killed in battle.

In Jurassic World: Fallen Kingdom, Claire is leading the Dinosaur Protection Group (DPG), an organization dedicated to saving the Isla Nublar dinosaurs from a volcanic eruption. She and Owen also become adoptive parents to Maisie, a clone of Benjamin Lockwood's deceased daughter. In Jurassic World Dominion, the couple set out to rescue Maisie after she is kidnapped by Biosyn for research purposes.

Some critics opined that the first film's depiction of Claire was sexist, including her use of high heels.

=== Zach Mitchell ===
- Appears in: Jurassic World
- Portrayed by: Nick Robinson

Zach Mitchell is Claire's 16-year-old nephew. He is annoyed and embarrassed by Gray's enthusiasm for the dinosaur exhibits, and mostly ignores him. When Gray becomes upset over their parents' impending divorce, Zach remains unsympathetic, ordering his little brother to grow up. Although Zach has a girlfriend, he frequently stares at other girls around the park, to the annoyance of Gray.

Zach gradually becomes interested in the park as the two boys explore it. They later come upon the decaying remains of the original Jurassic Park Visitor Center, before making their way back to Jurassic World. Their mother is frustrated by Zach's occasional meanness toward Gray, although the brothers eventually restore their bond during their vacation.

=== Gray Mitchell ===
- Appears in: Jurassic World
- Portrayed by: Ty Simpkins

Gray Mitchell is Claire's 11-year-old nephew. He is enthusiastic about dinosaurs and the theme park, to the annoyance of older brother Zach. He is also upset by his parents' impending divorce. When Gray and Zach encounter the Indominus, they escape by jumping off a waterfall. They subsequently find the decaying remains of the original Jurassic Park Visitor Center, before returning to Jurassic World. During a final confrontation between Owen's raptors and the Indominus, Gray convinces Claire to lure the Tyrannosaurus into battle by claiming that they need "more teeth" to defeat the Indominus.

Gray initially was written as a child with autism, but this trait was removed from the final script. Simpkins performed all of his own stunts with the exception of the waterfall jump.

=== Simon Masrani ===
- Appears in: Jurassic World
- Portrayed by: Irrfan Khan

Simon Masrani is the CEO of Masrani Global Corporation and the owner of Jurassic World. In the film, it is stated that Masrani is the eighth richest man in the world, and that John Hammond entrusted Masrani with his dying wish to open the theme park. In 2014, a viral marketing website for the fictional Masrani Global Corporation was launched to promote Jurassic World. According to the website, Masrani's father, Sanjay Masrani, started the company as a telecommunications business before eventually passing leadership to his son. The business then expanded into the oil industry and bought InGen after the death of Hammond in 1997. The website further states that in 2002, Masrani set out to construct Jurassic World, opening it three years later.

Masrani is joyful and makes his belief clear to park manager Claire that happiness is important for both the dinosaurs and park guests. When the Indominus rex escapes, he orders it captured alive since he has $26 million invested in it. When most of the ACU (short for Asset Containment Unit) team is wiped out, Masrani confronts the hybrid's creator Dr. Henry Wu who claims that he engineered it under Masrani's orders for "cooler" animals. Though still in the process of earning his helicopter license, Masrani pilots a helicopter to track the Indominus, taking two ACU soldiers with him to kill the animal. Fleeing from helicopter gunfire, the Indominus breaks into the park's aviary, letting loose Pteranodons and Dimorphodons. The pterosaurs collide with the helicopter which then plummets into the aviary, killing Masrani and several of the animals in the resulting explosion.

Khan described Masrani as "a very flamboyant person", and said that "he's trying to entertain the world with good intentions, but sometimes being flamboyant doesn't mean having much wisdom". The Masrani website states that the company experienced its worst financial crisis following the events of Jurassic World. In Jurassic World: Fallen Kingdom, it is revealed that the Masrani Corporation paid more than 800 million in unspecified currency to settle class action lawsuits filed by the survivors of the Jurassic World disaster.

Another in-universe website was launched to promote Fallen Kingdom and it states that an investigation was initiated after the Jurassic World incident. It found that Masrani Global had bribed members of the US House Committee of Science to revise a law in 2003, thereby allowing the company to start cloning dinosaurs for the upcoming Jurassic World. The investigation also found that Masrani Global had illegally cloned several dinosaur species prior to the 2003 revision. According to the website, it was unknown whether Simon Masrani had any knowledge of the illegal cloning.

=== Vic Hoskins ===
- Appears in: Jurassic World
- Portrayed by: Vincent D'Onofrio

Vic Hoskins is the head of InGen Security. He is the secondary antagonist of Jurassic World. In 2014, a viral marketing website for the fictional Masrani Global Corporation was launched to promote Jurassic World. According to the website, Hoskins attained the head position at InGen Security after overseeing the elimination of Pteranodons that escaped to Canada following the events of Jurassic Park III. Over time, he redeveloped and improved InGen Security.

Prior to events in Jurassic World, Hoskins had been involved in a two-year research program at the theme park meant to test the Velociraptors' intelligence. After observing the raptors obey Owen's commands, Hoskins desires to test them out as weaponized animals. Hoskins is also shown to have a secret alliance with Dr. Henry Wu, creator of the Indominus rex. Following Masrani's death, Hoskins takes command and puts his raptor plan into effect to kill the Indominus, with Owen reluctantly taking part. When it fails, Hoskins and the InGen team prioritize the evacuation of the lab, saving dinosaur embryos and transporting them, along with Dr. Wu, to an unspecified location. Before Hoskins can leave, a raptor corners him in the lab and kills him.

Prior to his death, Hoskins had revealed to Owen and Claire that he intended to create miniature versions of the Indominus rex as weapons to keep InGen Security viable. The Indoraptor, a smaller genetically engineered version of the Indominus, is later created by Dr. Wu as a weaponized animal in Jurassic World: Fallen Kingdom.

=== Lowery ===
- Appears in: Jurassic World
- Portrayed by: Jake Johnson

Lowery is the park's tech-savvy operations overseer and serves as the film's comic relief. He is a fan of the first theme park and wears a vintage Jurassic Park T-shirt. This causes Claire to scold him, considering it to be in bad taste due to the events that took place there. Lowery opposes the idea of genetically modified dinosaurs, believing it goes too far and that regular dinosaurs are superior. He keeps a collection of toy dinosaurs on his desk, which Owen knocks off after becoming frustrated by the operations team, much to Lowery's dismay.

After Hoskins assumes command, Lowery remains on duty in the control room and warns Claire about his plan to use the raptors to hunt the Indominus, an idea that Lowery considers insane. When the plan fails and an evacuation is called, Lowery opts to stay behind. He tries to kiss Vivian - his close friend and coworker, who he has a crush on - before she leaves, but she deflects him, saying that she has a boyfriend. Instead, he awkwardly shares a hug with her. Claire later orders Lowery to release the Tyrannosaurus from her paddock to attack the Indominus. After the Indominus is killed, Lowery shuts down the control room and leaves with a toy sauropod.

Johnson previously had a role in Trevorrow's 2012 film Safety Not Guaranteed. For Jurassic World, he worked with Trevorrow and co-writer Derek Connolly to make a backstory for the character, creating details that went unmentioned in the film. Johnson said, "We view Lowery as the kind of guy who would be obsessed with the original Jurassic Park. Not the movie, but the actual park, but was too young to have gone. We see him as a guy that, after college and Jurassic World came about, felt like he couldn't pass up the opportunity to work there. He's a guy who's working there in that control room in order to be close to the dinosaurs everyday". Johnson viewed Lowery as a voice for the audience in his critique of hybrid dinosaurs: "My character is basically saying a lot of times, well, why are they doing that?" After the film's release, Lowery quickly became a fan-favorite character.

Trevorrow considered bringing Lowery back for Jurassic World: Fallen Kingdom but eventually created an equivalent character named Franklin Webb because he considered Lowery too cynical to take part in the sequel's plot. Before being written out, Johnson had discussed his potential role with Connolly, later saying that Lowery "is a different guy because of what he went through in the first movie. Like he's got a huge ponytail now. I pitched that he's got sleeve tattoos. The trauma of seeing a dinosaur attack really messed him up. I thought we could have some fun".

Johnson was initially set to reprise the role in Jurassic World Dominion, but scheduling conflicts caused by the COVID-19 pandemic resulted in the character being written out. However, Lowery briefly appears in a picture on Franklin Webb's tablet, revealing that he now works for the CIA's Dangerous Species Division along with Vivian.

=== Barry Sembène ===
- Appears in: Jurassic World, Jurassic World Dominion, and Jurassic World: Chaos Theory
- Portrayed by: Omar Sy (Jurassic World, Jurassic World Dominion)
- Voiced by: Evan Michael Lee (Jurassic World: Chaos Theory)

Agent Barry Sembène is Owen Grady's assistant and friend who helps cares for the four Velociraptors at Jurassic World. Like Owen, Barry argues with Hoskins that Velociraptors cannot be used as military animals, though he reluctantly participates with Owen in leading the raptor hunt for the Indominus. He is later pursued by the raptor Blue and takes cover inside a hollow log. She attempts to break it open, causing him to draw his pistol in defense. Unable to bring himself to shoot Blue, he instead calls out her name, which briefly halts the attack. Owen is able to distract Blue, allowing Barry to escape. He later evacuates the island with other survivors.

Trevorrow had admired Sy's acting and wrote the character of Barry with him in mind for the role. Trevorrow wrote a friendship between Owen and Barry that "could be memorable and potentially carry on to future films".

Sy reprises the role in Jurassic World Dominion, reuniting with Pratt. Barry now works as an agent for French intelligence, helping to protect escaped dinosaurs. He helps Owen and Claire take down a dinosaur black market in search of their missing adopted daughter Maisie Lockwood. He later arrests Soyona Santos, a high-ranking member of the black market operation.

Barry reappears in season 3 of Jurassic World: Chaos Theory where he encounters the Nublar Six in their mutual pursuit of Santos. After being captured by Barry in Dominion, Santos escapes by setting off a bomb, trapping Barry in debris. Barry is rescued by Ben Pincus and Davi who lead him to where Santos is preparing to make her escape. Barry finally arrests Santos and allows Darius, Brooklynn, Ben and Yasmine to take Santos' escape helicopter to Biosyn.

=== Karen and Scott Mitchell ===
- Appears in: Jurassic World
- Portrayed by: Judy Greer and Andy Buckley

Karen and Scott Mitchell are Claire Dearing's sister and brother-in-law, respectively. They are the parents of Zach and Gray, and are going through a divorce while the boys are on a vacation at Jurassic World. Karen is upset when she learns her sister is working rather than spending time with the boys. She also tries to persuade Claire to start a family of her own. At the end of the film, Karen and Scott are shown holding hands, implying that they have reconciled, and are relieved to reunite with their sons.

Buckley at one point, was set to reprise his role for Jurassic World Dominion, but his role was removed during script rewrites.

=== Vivian ===
- Appears in: Jurassic World
- Portrayed by: Lauren Lapkus

Vivian works in the Jurassic World control room. When Masrani's helicopter crashes, she is grieved by his death. She appears to be close to her coworker Lowery, who secretly has a crush on her, and they are shown having personal conversations. When the control room is evacuated, Lowery stays behind and attempts to kiss Vivian, but she awkwardly stops him, saying that she has a boyfriend. Although Lowery knew about the boyfriend, he was not aware their relationship had progressed to that point, since Vivian rarely ever mentions him due to being at work. Instead, they share an awkward hug and Vivian asks if he will be alright before leaving. This scene was shot several times, with Lowery and Vivian kissing in some takes. Trevorrow ultimately chose to cut out their kiss because such a scene already existed between Owen and Claire: "I knew I could only pull off one kiss in this movie. There could be only one".

In Jurassic World Dominion, it is revealed that along with Lowery and later Franklin Webb, she ultimately joined the CIA's Dangerous Species Division. Her picture appears on Franklin's tablet briefly while he is paging through the former Jurassic World employees who have now joined intelligence agencies.

=== Hamada ===
- Appears in: Jurassic World
- Portrayed by: Brian Tee

Hamada is the commander of the Asset Containment Unit, an armed animal control team for Jurassic World. After the Indominus rex escapes its paddock, Masrani activates the ACU. The team finds the Indominus's internal tracking device, which had been ripped out by the dinosaur. As Hamada realizes the Indominus can camouflage, it emerges from the trees and grabs him. The ACU discharges weapons, causing the Indominus to drop Hamada. Before he can get away, the Indominus fatally crushes him with its foot, before going on to kill other ACU team members.

Tee underwent military training to prepare for the role. According to the Jurassic World special edition junior novelization, Hamada was a former SWAT team leader for the Tokyo Metropolitan Police Department.

=== Zara ===
- Appears in: Jurassic World
- Portrayed by: Katie McGrath

Zara is a British national and Claire's personal assistant. She is assigned to escort Zach and Gray during their visit to Jurassic World, although she is unenthusiastic. While she is preoccupied talking about her upcoming wedding on her cell phone, the two boys slip away to explore the park on their own. During the aviary breakout, Zara locates the boys, but is grabbed by a Pteranodon and falls into the Mosasaurus lagoon. She is then captured by another Pteranodon, which attempts to fly off with her, but the Mosasaurus emerges from the water and grabs the Pteranodon, swallowing Zara in the process.

Zara is the first female character to die in the series. Trevorrow said he wanted to make it "the most spectacular death we can possibly imagine", while also wanting to surprise moviegoers, stating, "Let's have someone die who just doesn't deserve to die at all". McGrath performed her own stunts for the scene. Zara's death received a mixed response, with some critics questioning whether she deserved to die in such a way. As a result, Trevorrow said that for Jurassic World: Fallen Kingdom, "we made sure that every death was earned. Everybody deserves their death in this movie, a lesson learned. In 2018 everyone earns it. Horrible people".

== Appearing in Fallen Kingdom ==
These characters are introduced in the fifth film, Jurassic World: Fallen Kingdom (2018). In the film, the dinosaurs of Isla Nublar are threatened by the island's newly active volcano. Claire teams up with Owen, as well as Benjamin Lockwood (John Hammond's former partner) and his aide Eli Mills, to relocate the dinosaurs to a new island. Later, it is discovered that Mills actually intends to auction the dinosaurs for profit, murdering Lockwood in order to carry out his plan. Owen and Claire disrupt the auction after several dinosaurs are shipped out around the world. A hybrid prototype dinosaur, the Indoraptor, subsequently escapes and wreaks havoc at Lockwood's estate before being killed. Lockwood's granddaughter Maisie, said to be a clone of his deceased daughter, is adopted by Owen and Claire.

=== Eli Mills ===
- Appears in: Jurassic World: Fallen Kingdom
- Portrayed by: Rafe Spall

Eli Mills is Sir Benjamin Lockwood's ambitious aide, a businessman in charge of Lockwood's estate, and the main antagonist of the film. Mills has operated Lockwood's foundation since graduating from college, and believes that Maisie Lockwood is a clone. Mills had Lockwood Estate's laboratory facilities reactivated and updated, and hired skilled geneticists from around the world to conduct genetic research with Henry Wu. Mills goes against Lockwood's plan to transport the Isla Nublar dinosaurs to a new island sanctuary so that he can instead auction them at Lockwood Estate, and use the money to fund further genetic research.

When Lockwood discovers his plan, Mills smothers him to death. As he does do, he tells Lockwood with regard to his cloned daughter "John Hammond was right. It was an unholy thing that you did. I'm not the only guilty one here, am I, sir?" Mills makes it appear that Lockwood died in his sleep, weakened from illness. He becomes Maisie's guardian and tells her, Owen, and Claire of what he thinks about Maisie, revealed later was a lie formulated by Lockwood to hide Maisie's true origin. After the auction is sabotaged and the dinosaurs are released, Mills attempts to flee with a bone sample of the Indominus rex only to be killed by the Tyrannosaurus which then crushes the sample.

Spall said that Mills "believes he is doing right. He has been entrusted with pushing Lockwood's fortune into the future and making it survive after he dies. Mills feels he is simply doing what he was asked to do".

=== Franklin Webb ===
- Appears in: Jurassic World: Fallen Kingdom, Jurassic World Dominion
- Portrayed by: Justice Smith

Franklin Webb is a former Jurassic World technician who joins the Dinosaur Protection Group (DPG) as a systems analyst. According to a promotional website for the DPG, Franklin is a Los Angeles native and initially began working at Jurassic World's off-site tech complex in Irvine, California. He has a passive personality and is forced into circumstances far outside his comfort zone throughout the film. Near the end of the film, Franklin overcomes his fears and injects Wu with a tranquilizer (carfentanil) when he threatens Zia. Later, he and Zia work to save the dinosaurs from a hydrogen cyanide leak in the Lockwood Estate labs.

Smith nearly turned down the role, as he had already been chosen for a part in the off-Broadway play Yen. Smith was ultimately able to do both projects.

In Jurassic World Dominion, Franklin accompanies Claire and Zia to rescue a baby Nasutoceratops from an illegal breeding site by serving as their getaway driver. However, he announces to Claire that he no longer wants to be part of their discreet missions and has accepted a job in the CIA to help monitor dinosaur activities in San Francisco. Later, after Maisie is captured by Biosyn, Owen and Claire persuade Franklin to help them find the kidnappers, despite Franklin's connection to them being risky for his current employment due to the Dinosaur Protection Group facing criminal charges after the events at the Lockwood Manor.

=== Dr. Zia Rodriguez ===
- Appears in: Jurassic World: Fallen Kingdom, Jurassic World Dominion
- Portrayed by: Daniella Pineda

Dr. Zia Rodriguez is a paleo-veterinarian. According to the DPG website, she is from Seattle and was accepted for an animal healthcare internship at Jurassic World before it closed. In the film, Claire has recruited Zia to the DPG to help secure funds and find a natural habitat for Isla Nublar's surviving dinosaurs. On the island, Ken Wheatley double-crosses the DPG and shoots Owen with a lethal dose of animal tranquilizer. Zia saves him by removing the dart. After Owen's Velociraptor Blue is shot, she operates on the animal and saves it with a transfusion of Tyrannosaurus blood. Zia and Franklin later work to save the dinosaurs from a hydrogen cyanide leak at the Lockwood Estate labs.

Before getting the role, Pineda had to audition seven times and demonstrate her comedy, drama, and improvisation skills. Pineda, a Mexican-American, suggested that the character be of Latin descent, and the filmmakers agreed, giving Zia the last name of Rodriguez. Zia is the first major Latin character to appear in the films. Pineda consulted with veterinarians for her role.

While not stated in the film, a production document refers to Zia as a former Marine. A scene showing that Zia is lesbian was cut from the film for runtime reasons. Pineda liked the scene because it provided "a little insight into my character", but said she understood why it needed to be cut for runtime purposes. Describing the scene, Pineda said: "It's me and Chris Pratt and we are in a military vehicle with all of these mercenaries. I look at Chris and am like, 'Yeah. Square jaw. Good bone structure. Tall. Muscles. I don't date men, but if I did, it would be you. It would gross me out, but I would do it.'"

In Jurassic World Dominion, Zia accompanies Claire and Franklin to rescue a baby Nasutoceratops from an illegal breeding site. However, both she and Franklin decide they no longer wish to help Claire on her discreet missions, following yet another close call. Pineda was meant to film a later scene as well, but was unable to do so because of COVID-19 quarantine restrictions. Instead, a new character was written to take her place in the later scene, with Varada Sethu portraying a worker at a dinosaur relocation facility.

=== Sir Benjamin Lockwood ===
- Appears in: Jurassic World: Fallen Kingdom
- Portrayed by: James Cromwell

Sir Benjamin Lockwood is John Hammond's partner in developing the technology to clone dinosaurs, though he is not mentioned in prior films or novels. It was writer Colin Trevorrow's idea to add a "silent partner" for Hammond. The original Jurassic Park novel briefly chronicles the early years leading up to dinosaur cloning, and this made Trevorrow realize that Hammond would have had many people involved in such a project, leading to Lockwood's creation in Fallen Kingdom.

In the film, it is stated that Lockwood had a daughter who supposedly died in a traffic collision, and that he used his technology to clone her, which led to a falling out with Hammond. However, Lockwood's cloned daughter Maisie was born nine years before the events of Jurassic World: Fallen Kingdom and long after Hammond had died. Trevorrow clarified that Hammond and Lockwood parted ways due to the latter's "intentions, not his acts". With the help of housekeeper Iris, Lockwood raises the clone to believe that she was his orphaned granddaughter named Maisie and that his daughter was Maisie's late mother. Lockwood and Maisie reside at Lockwood Estate in northern California. Hammond and Lockwood had built a laboratory in the subbasement of the mansion, where they extracted the first dinosaur DNA from amber and created their cloning technology, prior to starting their Jurassic Park project on Isla Nublar and Isla Sorna.

Lockwood is now in poor health and dying, and uses a wheelchair and medications. His wealth is managed by a foundation, which is operated by his assistant Eli Mills. Lockwood and Mills request Claire's help in rescuing Isla Nublar's dinosaurs from the impending volcanic eruption. However, Lockwood learns from Maisie that Mills intends to sell the dinosaurs at auction. Lockwood protests the idea as Mills defends his plan in the interests of guiding Lockwood's legacy. When Lockwood tells Mills to turn himself in to the police, Mills smothers him with a pillow and stages it as a natural death while planning to take custody of Maisie. Mills is later killed by a Tyrannosaurus.

In Jurassic World Dominion, the truth of Maisie's origin is revealed: rather than being created as a clone by Lockwood, Maisie instead was asexually reproduced by her mother, scientist Charlotte Lockwood. The film states that Benjamin Lockwood, Charlotte's father, created the previous story as a cover-up for protecting his daughter and granddaughter, fearing the world would not accept them.

=== Mr. Eversoll ===
- Appears in: Jurassic World: Fallen Kingdom
- Portrayed by: Toby Jones

Mr. Eversoll is the auctioneer who sells the rescued dinosaurs. He auctions several species, and previews the prototype Indoraptor. Despite objections from Dr. Wu, Mills allows Eversoll to sell the creature to a Russian arms dealer. After the auction is disrupted, Eversoll retreats into an elevator where three auction attendees have taken refuge. Before the elevator can ascend, the escaped Indoraptor breaks the door mechanism and kills Eversoll along with the others.

Jones considered his character to be "like a rogue arms dealer; he sees profits in selling these creatures as weapons. He is totally morally neutral about whatever he is selling. He is only interested in whether or not it will make him a profit". Director J. A. Bayona allowed Jones to decide his character's appearance. Eversoll's hair was depicted with a wig, and is a reference to Donald Trump's hair.

=== Ken Wheatley ===
- Appears in: Jurassic World: Fallen Kingdom
- Portrayed by: Ted Levine

Ken Wheatley is a seasoned mercenary and animal trafficker who is in command of the dinosaur rescue operation on Isla Nublar. He plucks a tooth from each captured dinosaur as a trophy, with plans to make a necklace. When Blue is found, Wheatley shoots both her and Owen with tranquilizer darts, and leaves Owen to die. Later, Wheatley captures Owen and Claire as they track the captured dinosaurs to Lockwood Estate. After the auction is disrupted, Wheatley finds the Indoraptor in its cage and shoots it with two tranquilizer darts; he enters the cage to retrieve a tooth, but the creature feigned unconsciousness and devours Wheatley's arm before mauling him to death.

Bayona said about Levine: "He came with this idea of creating this kind of military man. He just wanted to portray the most hateable character possible. [...] And he was so creative on set, trying to give ideas, bringing story notes to make this character more and more hateable".

=== Maisie Lockwood ===
- Appears in: Jurassic World: Fallen Kingdom, Jurassic World Dominion
- Portrayed by: Isabella Sermon

Maisie Lockwood is initially portrayed as the nine-year-old granddaughter of Benjamin Lockwood, adopted by him after her mother Charlotte died in a car accident. Maisie lives at Lockwood Estate and is cared for by family housekeeper Iris. She has a passion for dinosaurs, and expresses curiosity about her mother. Later in the film, Maisie learns that Benjamin actually cloned her from Charlotte. She is subsequently pursued by the Indoraptor, and later releases the unsold captive dinosaurs into the wilderness to save them from a hydrogen cyanide leak. Being a clone, she sympathizes with the dinosaurs and believes they should be free. Following Benjamin's death, Owen and Claire go on to adopt Maisie.

In Jurassic World Dominion, four years have passed since the incident at the estate, and rumors have circulated about Maisie's existence as a clone. In the Sierra Nevada, the now-teenaged Maisie has become rebellious over living in seclusion with Owen and Claire, who worry that she will be kidnapped for research purposes if she leaves home. She is also having an existential crisis over being a clone, and is curious to learn more about Charlotte. When Blue shows up at the family's cabin with a hatchling, Maisie names it Beta and forms a bond with it. Later, they are both captured and brought to the headquarters of Biosyn, where Maisie discovers more about her origins. In addition to being Charlotte's clone, Maisie learns that she was also birthed by Charlotte, making them daughter and mother. Charlotte later died of a genetic disease. Biosyn scientist Dr. Henry Wu wishes to study Maisie and Beta's altered DNA to find a solution to the company's giant locusts, which threaten the world food supply. Maisie eventually reunites with Owen and Claire, and helps Wu to resolve the locust problem.

Fallen Kingdom marked the film debut for Sermon. Trevorrow included human cloning to explore the effects that genetic power would have in the Jurassic Park film universe. Maisie's true origin as Charlotte's daughter had always been planned by Trevorrow.

=== Iris ===
- Appears in: Jurassic World: Fallen Kingdom
- Portrayed by: Geraldine Chaplin

Iris is the Lockwood Estate housekeeper and Maisie's nanny. She raised Benjamin Lockwood's daughter Charlotte, who later died after asexually giving birth to her daughter Maisie. Following Charlotte's death, Iris raises Maisie, personally encouraging her to speak in a British RP accent whilst living in the United States. When Mills becomes Maisie's guardian following Lockwood's death, he dismisses Iris, who is upset about having to leave Maisie.

Chaplin had appeared in each of Bayona's previous films. She said "He gives me little bits in every film; he thinks I'm his good luck charm".

== Appearing in Dominion ==
These characters are introduced in the sixth film, Jurassic World Dominion (2022), which revolves around the genetics corporation Biosyn and a dinosaur black market in Malta.

=== Kayla Watts ===
- Portrayed by: DeWanda Wise

Kayla Watts is a U.S. Air Force veteran and cargo pilot who transports dinosaurs to Biosyn. Having witnessed Owen Grady and Claire Dearing's adoptive daughter Maisie Lockwood being trafficked to the Biosyn sanctuary, she helps them rescue her from the company's CEO Dr. Lewis Dodgson. Kayla is upset when her plane, a Fairchild C-119, is attacked by a Quetzalcoatlus and crashes in the Biosyn sanctuary. Later, she flies the survivors out in a Biosyn helicopter. She is subsequently shown happily purchasing a new plane.

Wise did not see the original Jurassic Park film until 2019, the year she was cast in Dominion. Trevorrow was impressed by Wise's lead role in the television series She's Gotta Have It. He offered her the role of Kayla during their first meeting, without having her audition. Wise is of African American descent, although the character was not originally written as such. Wise worked with the film's co-writer, Emily Carmichael, to refine the character. Wise came up with Kayla's traits and backstory, stating that she is bisexual and "fresh out of the Air Force". Kayla was inspired by Indiana Jones and Han Solo, two characters portrayed by Harrison Ford. Wise said the character was also inspired by Sarah Harding's "get-it-done" personality in the novel The Lost World.

Wise noted that much of the film takes place in Kayla's "world", specifically places that she is familiar with, such as Biosyn's headquarters, the black market, and her airplane. She described Kayla as being disillusioned early on in the film, in the same way that "many of us human beings on planet Earth today feel, which is just like, 'Well, I mean, if people in power, if they don't care, what can I do?'" According to Wise, her character is "in this place when we first meet her that's just like, 'If you can't beat them, join them'". Wise prepared for the role by working out, and she performed her own stunts. Much of the cockpit scene – in which Kayla is flying Owen and Claire to Biosyn – was improvised.

Before the character's name was revealed, some fans speculated that Wise would be playing Kelly Curtis, taking over the role from Vanessa Lee Chester. Trevorrow said such an idea was not considered: "This is a global franchise for people all around the world. Inventing new Black heroes is important". Wise also said she would have turned down a role as Kelly, not wanting to replace Chester.

=== Ramsay Cole ===
- Portrayed by: Mamoudou Athie

Ramsay Cole is the head of communications for Biosyn, and is also being groomed by CEO Lewis Dodgson as his second-in-command. Dodgson describes Ramsay as a younger version of himself to Alan Grant and Ellie Sattler when introducing them. Unlike Dodgson, Ramsey is kind-hearted, moral and even cares for the dinosaurs, mourning how they were being treated and wanting more humane ways of handling them. In an extended scene, shows that Ramsay sees potentials in Dodgson to be a good man, and urges him to atone his crimes by sharing the company's research worldwide and repurposing his hybrid locusts to improve the world's agricultures. Although Ramsay is assigned to be their tour guide at Biosyn, the two eventually go off to collect a DNA sample from the company's giant locusts, after Malcolm informed them of a scheme to use the insects for domination over the food industry. Upon finding Grant and Sattler in a restricted area, Ramsay reveals himself to not only be on their side, but to have been the one who had revealed the truth to Malcolm in the first place. Later, as Dodgson prepares to flee, he tries to enlist Ramsay's help in rebuilding elsewhere and is shocked to realize that Ramsay had betrayed him. Ramsay walks away after simply telling Dodgson that he is nothing like him, given up on changing Dodgson. Ramsay's knowledge of the facility proves to be crucial in the group's escape. After the giant locusts are stopped and Dodgson is killed by three Dilophosaurus, Ramsay joins Alan, Ellie, and Ian in testifying against Biosyn as a whistleblower.

Trevorrow had seen Athie in the 2018 film The Front Runner and was impressed with his performance, casting him in Dominion without going through an audition or screen test. Athie said that Ramsay Cole, as originally written, was "a lot less sure and confident of himself" and "a little silly". He and Trevorrow worked together to reshape the character. Athie described the final character as "a very ambitious and forward-thinking young man". Of all the characters in Dominion, Ramsay's story arc is Trevorrow's favorite: "It's a great character for young people to look to as we realize that our mentors and our bosses aren't necessarily the ones who are going to create change. It's gonna take us doing it".

=== Soyona Santos ===
- Portrayed by: Dichen Lachman

Soyona Santos is a dinosaur smuggler connected with the black market and serves as Lewis Dodgson's criminal liaison. She raises a pack of Atrociraptors originally from Biosyn which are trained to kill any target, as designated by a laser pointer, for Rainn Delacourt to deliver to Riyadh.

During a raid at the black market, Santos warns Dodgson that Owen and Claire are present and looking for their daughter Maisie, who has been kidnapped by her under Dodgson's orders. Santos releases her raptors to attack Barry. Claire catches up with Santos and incapacitates her after a brief fight. Claire interrogates her with a taser into revealing Maisie's whereabouts. Santos revealed the location much to her dismay to Claire, she also warns Claire that she lost Maisie to Santos` final order. Arriving back to the place where it all began, Santos is making one final attempt to send her raptors after Owen (though this ploy ends in failure), before being arrested by French intelligence agent Barry Sembène. Dodgson ordered his employees to call Santos, who warns them that Owen and Claire are heading to Biosyn.

Lachman said Santos is motivated by money and power, but is otherwise a mysterious character with "a lot of ambiguity". She developed a lengthy backstory for the character which is absent from the film. Trevorrow described Santos as "a badass who's at the top of her game".

Santos returns in Jurassic World: Chaos Theory, serving as the main antagonist. Unseen in the first season, she is revealed to be the mysterious Broker targeting the Nublar Six in the second season. In the second and third season, Brooklynn infiltrates Santos' operation to take it down from the inside, earning her trust after saving Santos' life. At the end of season three, following the events in Malta, Santos escapes from custody and attempts to reach an extraction helicopter sent by Dodgson. However, she is attacked by the Handler who regains control of the Atrociraptor pack, only to have Santos set a controlled Carnotaurus on her, killing the Handler and the Atrociraptor Ghost. Darius and Yaz arrive and Brooklynn distracts Santos by trying to recruit the two and then threatening their lives, buying time for Ben and Davi to bring Barry and French intelligence agents. Santos is finally arrested to face justice for her crimes, her plans ruined, while Brooklynn, Darius, Ben and Yaz take Santos' helicopter to stop Biosyn.

=== Rainn Delacourt ===
- Portrayed by: Scott Haze

Rainn Delacourt is a poacher with ties to Soyona Santos's animal trafficking operations. In an extended scene, Owen and two Department of Fish and Wildlife officers first encounter him and some of his men who were posing as the same agents in order to steal the Parasaurolophus they caught, causing them having animosity. Santos sends him and a team of mercenaries to abduct Maisie and a baby Velociraptor known as Beta for Biosyn. Owen locates Rainn at the black market and forces him to reveal Maisie and Beta's whereabouts. Afterward, Rainn is critically wounded by a juvenile Carnotaurus and a Lystrosaurus, before being killed by a juvenile Baryonyx, with Owen letting Rainn to die out of spite for what he did to Maisie.

In Jurassic World: Chaos Theory, Rainn is mentioned by Santos who tells Dodgson that she will send him rather than the Handler to capture Maisie and Beta.

=== Charlotte Lockwood ===
- Portrayed by: Elva Trill (adult), Isabella Sermon (young)

Charlotte Lockwood is the daughter of Sir Benjamin Lockwood and the mother of Maisie Lockwood. In Jurassic World: Fallen Kingdom, she is mentioned to have died in a car accident. She made her onscreen debut in Jurassic World Dominion, through video footage shot before her death. In the latter film, Charlotte is revealed to have worked as a geneticist with Dr. Henry Wu at the InGen facility on Isla Sorna. It is also revealed that Charlotte actually died of a genetic disease while her daughter Maisie, a genetic match of herself, was young.

== Appearing in Rebirth ==
These characters are introduced in the seventh film, Jurassic World Rebirth (2025).

=== Zora Bennett ===
- Portrayed by: Scarlett Johansson

Zora Bennett is the film's main protagonist, and a skilled ex-military covert operative expert. She is initially contacted by Martin Krebs to lead a mission to retrieve DNA samples from the three largest remaining dinosaurs on the planet which will be used to create a new heart medication. After she meets him in his car and he convinces her to come with him to meet their team's paleontologist, also reminding her that her own mother died of heart problems, she agrees, and talks to an old friend of hers, Duncan Kincaid, to assist in the mission. They haggle with Martin over how much they are to be paid for the mission, and depart, bringing along a few of Duncan's colleagues, including Bobby Atwater, who she is implied to have a romantic past with.

While tracking the first prehistoric creature, the Mosasaurus, the team receives a distress call from a stranded family, and she suggests they temporarily divert to rescue them, which the majority agree with. Upon finding the family was shipwrecked by the Mosasaurus, they find it quickly, and after the paleontologist, Dr. Henry Loomis, chains her to a spot where she can extract the DNA with a special dart, she manages to get a sample from the Mosasaurus. As she stores the sample, Henry suggests to her that they may distribute the medicine freely instead of giving it to a company which controls who gets it and who doesn't, but she is uninterested. After the team's ship is forced aground and two are killed, as well as being separated from the family altogether, she reveals to the survivors that she employed a rescue helicopter to circle the center of the island in 24 hours, leaving them that much time to recover the two other samples.

On the way to retrieve the second sample, she confronts Martin over seemingly having left one of the family to die. He denies it, and the conversation is cut off when they are distracted by an eel, though she does not appear to believe his story. After easily getting the second sample from a Titanosaurus and being awed by its majesty, she and two other members of the team attempt to extract the last sample from a Quetzalcoatlus egg. They rappel to the nest, and she asks Henry about ways to distribute the medicine to as many people as possible, finding that if it was released open-source with no patent everyone would have it, but no money would be made from it. After extracting the sample they are then attacked by the parent Quetzalcoatlus but saved by another mercenary, who distracts the creature and is killed by it shortly after while they escape, her rappelling down the cliff where she reunites with the team, including Henry, who fell with the sample.

She then leads the survivors to the helipad, where they reunite with the family that was separated from them earlier. Waiting for the helicopter, she finds that Martin deliberately would have let one of the family die, and confronts him, but he takes the samples and holds her at gunpoint. They are then attacked by Mutadons, and she hides under a car with Martin, who pushes her out and flees, though she manages to take his gun and later kill one of the Mutadons that attacked a member of the family. After the helicopter is destroyed by the Distortus rex which also kills Martin, she and Duncan manage to trap the Mutadons in a tunnel before getting to a boat and escaping with the samples which Zora recovers from Martin's remains. Duncan separates from the group to lure the Distortus rex away against her wishes, but she notices he survived this ordeal and has the group rescue him, before they leave the island. On the way back to civilization, Zora and Henry agree to distribute the medicine without a patent.

=== Dr. Henry Loomis ===
- Portrayed by: Jonathan Bailey

Dr. Henry Loomis is a paleontologist and was a student of Dr. Alan Grant. Besides his expertise on paleontology, he is inventive and able to build remarkable devices. He is introduced working at a museum, having to close the dinosaur exhibit due to low attendances, where he is approached by Zora Bennett and Martin Krebs, the latter of whom is an executive at the pharmaceutical company Parker-Genix who has recruited Bennett for a mission to retrieve dinosaur DNA, as Henry has advised them that the DNA of the three largest remaining dinosaur species could be used for a medication to cure heart disease. Henry is convinced by Martin to come along on the mission.

Heading to Ile St. Hubert, the island the dinosaurs are on, by ship, Henry's attachment to the dinosaurs is shown when he comes into conflict with Bobby Atwater, the team's security expert, over his willingness to kill the dinosaurs, calling it a sin. After a detour to rescue a stranded family, the group finds the first dinosaur to extract DNA from, the Mosasaurus, and after Henry offers to be the one to do it, Zora shows him how it would be done, and he lets her do it instead. He chains her to the deck, and when she drops the equipment the first time she tries, he gives her a replacement, and she successfully extracts the sample. When storing it, he suggests to her that they could distribute the medicine to the world instead of letting the company decide, but she does not appear to agree. Shortly afterward, the ship is attacked by a group of Spinosaurus that hunt alongside the Mosasaurus, which Henry is fascinated by, recognizing it as symbiosis. After getting to shallow water, he and the crew, separated from the family, jump out and get to shore as the boat is destroyed. When Martin admits to the team that the island was an R&D site for InGen where the mutant dinosaurs too ugly or scary for the theme park were kept, he is disgusted, even more so when Martin admits the reason they weren't simply destroyed was because they were expensive to create and InGen couldn't justify losing the money to their investors.

Travelling through the jungle to get to the location where the second sample could be extracted, he is insulted when Martin calls the dinosaurs stupid, pointing out that they lasted for millions of years, while humans, despite being more intelligent, are driving themselves and the planet to destruction quicker. Henry accompanies the team to a field where they see a pair of Titanosaurs mating, and Zora extracts the second sample. He is amazed by this, saying he never thought he'd see dinosaurs in the wild. Later, when the team gets to a vantage point, he reveals his plan to get the third necessary DNA sample, Quetzalcoatlus, from an egg instead of from a full-grown specimen, since it is a flying carnivore. He mentions that he frequently exercises at a climbing wall, and he, Zora and another mercenary rappel down to the nest where he extracts a sample from an egg. While he extracts, Zora asks him about how to distribute the medicine, and he points out that giving it, and the rights to it, to Parker-Genix or any other company would make them rich, but the company would decide who gets the medication, while distributing it open-source, without a patent would allow anyone to be cured but no one would make money. The parent Quetzalcoatlus returns and attacks them, causing them to nearly lose the sample before it is distracted by the other mercenary, who it kills. Henry manages to save the sample but falls from the cliff when his rope breaks, but lands in a pool of water and recovers it, being reunited with the team shortly after.

Following this, he accompanies the team to the center, where Zora has informed them a rescue helicopter will come. They reunite with the family and he witnesses Martin take the suitcase containing the samples from Zora and wait for the helicopter. The group is then attacked by Mutadons, and he and Duncan Kincaid, the ship's captain, are overlooked by the helicopter, but he manages to signal it with a flare. However, when it returns for them, it is destroyed by the Distortus rex. Henry and Duncan reunite with the family and flee through a tunnel, where they eventually escape after being saved by Zora, who also manages to recover the samples from Martin's corpse after he is killed by the Distortus rex. When they manage to find a boat, Duncan leads the predator away, and Henry convinces Zora to come with him and the family instead. However, they find that Duncan has survived after the Distortus rex leaves, and save him. Heading off the island on the boat, Henry and Zora decide to distribute the medicine without a patent.

=== Duncan Kincaid ===
- Portrayed by: Mahershala Ali

Duncan Kincaid is Zora's longtime friend who is a mercenary and the leader of the expedition. After Zora agrees to Martin's request to extract DNA samples from the three largest remaining dinosaurs, she, Martin and Henry Loomis, the team's paleontologist, meet Duncan at a bar in Suriname, where he works with Zora to get more money out of Martin, agreeing to the mission as he still hasn't completely paid off his boat, the Essex. He also brings his crew along, consisting of boat driver LeClerc, lookout Nina, and security chief Bobby Atwater, who is implied to have a romantic past with Zora. He also mentions that he outlived his own son, and after the boy's death, his wife Amelia left him, unable to handle the constant reminder of losing her child. His loss also makes him extremely protective of children.

Duncan leads the team out to Ile St. Hubert, but after they receive a mayday signal from another boat, argues with Martin over whether to help the family. He claims that while Martin is paying for the mission, it's his boat, and diverts course, rescuing the stranded Delgado family. After finding the first dinosaur to extract a sample from, the Mosasaurus, he drives the boat alongside it while Zora gets the sample. After the boat is attacked by a group of Spinosaurus alongside the Mosasaurus, he steers the boat toward the island, knowing he can outpace the Spinosaurs and the Mosasaurus cannot go in shallow water. However, he is forced to crash it on the island following the loss of Bobby and Nina, while the family jumps overboard.

Duncan accompanies the team through the jungle and is amazed when they find a herd of Titanosaurus, from one of which Zora extracts the second sample. After this, they head to the mountains, and he and Martin lower the others down to the nest of a Quetzalcoatlus so they can get the last sample. After the Quetzalcoatlus attacks LeClerc, Duncan and Martin attempt to pull him up but fail to save him from being swallowed alive, and barely manage to escape the creature by heading into a tunnel they saw earlier, which brings them to the bottom of the mountain where they reunite with Zora and Henry, who have successfully gotten the last sample.

The group then heads to the center of the island, which contains a workers' village with a helipad that Zora has informed them a helicopter will land at that night. They reunite with the family there, and Duncan is relieved to see them alive. After Martin is called out for nearly leaving one of the family to die, the group is attacked by Mutadons, and Duncan and Henry flee to a lab where they notice a boat. Following the helicopter's destruction by the Distortus rex, Duncan and Henry reunite with the family in a tunnel and are saved from a Mutadon by Zora, before he manages to trap the other dinosaurs in the tunnel. After Zora retrieves the samples from a now-dead Martin, the group heads to the boat, where Duncan, against Zora's urging, lures the Distortus rex away with a flare to allow the others to escape. He is thought to have been killed doing this, but is shown to have survived and is rescued by the others, before they leave the island together.

In the original script, Duncan was intended to die saving the group from the Distortus rex, but due to Mahershala Ali's star status and the possibility of a sequel, Universal decided that he should survive and had an additional scene filmed showing this, which made it into the final film.

=== Martin Krebs ===
- Portrayed by: Rupert Friend

Martin Krebs is the film's main antagonist and a pharmaceutical representative at Parker-Genix who recruits Zora Bennett and Dr. Henry Loomis on a top-secret mission to retrieve DNA samples from the world's largest dinosaurs (consisting of the aquatic Mosasaurus, terrestrial Titanosaurus, and avian Quetzalcoatlus) which he claims hold the key to a new heart disease treatment. He is first seen in a traffic jam caused by a dying Apatosaurus, complaining, before he meets Zora, who sneaks into his car, and he promises to reward her well if she does it for him. He brings her along to persuade Henry to join the mission, again manipulating her by reminding her that her own mother died of heart disease. After they agree, she leads him to an old friend, Duncan Kincaid, who owns a boat and agrees to bring them to the island they need to get the samples from, if he doubles their pay, which he agrees to. After meeting Duncan's security chief, Bobby Atwater, the group heads for the island.

On the way, they receive a distress call from a stranded family, and while Martin and Bobby want to ignore it to focus on the mission, Duncan overrules them as captain and they rescue the family, the Delgados. Shortly after, they manage to extract a sample from the Mosasaurus but are immediately afterward attacked by a group of Spinosaurus that it hunts alongside. When one of the Delgados attempts to call for help, Martin stops her, wanting to keep the mission secret. While trying to explain to Teresa, she tries to push Martin, causing her to stumble backwards and cling to the rail, eventually falling off while Martin lays stunned on the ground. While the rest of the family jump off to help her, Martin remains on the boat as it heads for shallower water, but jumps off when it crashes. After they arrive on the beach having lost two crew members, Martin admits that the island was an R&D site where the dinosaurs too ugly or dangerous for a theme park were left, and that they were not destroyed because they were expensive to create and InGen couldn't risk losing their investors. Informed by Zora there will be a rescue helicopter at the helipad in the center of the island in 24 hours, Martin joins the team to collect the remaining samples before then.

Along with the team, Martin treks through the jungle and is at one point confronted by Zora over not having helped the girl. He claims he tried but couldn't get to her in time, though she does not appear to believe him, before the conversation ends when he is startled by a large eel brushing by his leg. Continuing on, Martin makes a comment about the dinosaurs being stupid and is called out by Henry, who points out that for all humanity's intelligence, they are destroying themselves and the planet in less time than the dinosaurs died out. Shortly after, Martin notices a small helicopter crashed in a tree, its pilot dead, and he discreetly takes a pistol from the corpse. The group reaches a field containing a herd of Titanosaurus, and he watches in awe as Zora extracts the second sample from one. The group then heads to the mountains to get the third sample, and after reaching a mountain containing a Quetzalcoatlus nest, Martin and Duncan lower the others to it to get a sample from an egg. He and Duncan attempt to help LeClerc, one of Duncan's crew, escape the parent Quetzalcoatlus, but fail, barely escaping it when it attacks them. After reuniting with Zora and Henry, who have the sample, they head for the helipad.

At the helipad, they are reunited with the family, and he is accused of leaving them to die. He denies it, but afterward takes the samples and holds them at gunpoint with the gun he took, saying they will just wait for the helicopter. However, the group is attacked by Mutadons, and he ends up hiding under a car with Zora. He kicks her out and attempts to kill one with the gun, but fails, and she takes it, though he escapes in the car with the samples. Heading to the port, he is forced off the road by an Ankylosaurus and ends up crashing near the tunnel the other survivors have ended up at. The Distortus rex, which followed them after destroying the helicopter, notices him, and eats him as he attempts to escape, dropping his arm with the samples still in it, which Zora recovers.

=== Reuben Delgado ===
- Portrayed by: Manuel Garcia-Rulfo

Reuben Delgado is the father of a shipwrecked civilian family. He first appears on his boat, the Mariposa, with his teenage daughter Teresa, his younger daughter Isabella and Teresa's boyfriend Xavier Dobbs, who he dislikes for being lazy. He is implied to be divorced from the mother of his daughters, and Teresa is protective of her sister and serves as a surrogate mother to her. Reuben took his family to a sailing trip as one last family adventure before Teresa goes to college. He first is irritated with Xavier not pulling his weight and Teresa for defending him. After witnessing sails in the ocean, the boat is capsized by the Mosasaurus, and Reuben protects his daughters and tries to help Xavier, who is still in the boat. After Xavier fails to get the emergency radio out, Reuben tells him to just save himself, however, Xavier manages to save the radio.

The next day, after spending the night on the capsized boat calling for help, Reuben and his family are rescued by the crew of the Essex, who, unknown to them, are on a mission to extract DNA from three dinosaurs, including the Mosasaurus. When Reuben tells them that the Mosasaurus was what capsized their boat, the team finds it and extracts its DNA, keeping Reuben and his family below deck not to jeopardize the secrecy of the mission. However, they do notice the ship chasing the Mosasaurus, which unnerves Isabella and Xavier, who Reuben tries to calm.

However, when the Mosasaurus attacks the ship accompanied by a group of Spinosaurus, Reuben has Teresa send a mayday signal, however, she is stopped from doing so by the mission's benefactor, Martin Krebs, who wants the mission to remain secret, and he causes her to fall overboard. Seeing this, and Xavier jumping in after her, Reuben takes Isabella and follows. He injures his leg doing this, but they reunite with the other two and swim through an underwater cave to get to the island, where Teresa tells him that Martin let her fall out. Reuben takes a long stick for help walking and decides to follow the pipes they have seen to the geothermal powered village that the ship's crew mentioned. He is briefly disappointed when Xavier mentions that he has weed, which Teresa tries to brush off as him joking. Spending the night in the jungle, Reuben thanks Xavier for saving Teresa, and when Xavier expresses inadequacy over not knowing why she likes him, reassures him that he is good enough.

The next morning, the family finds a river with a shed on the other side. Teresa crosses and finds an emergency raft inside, but they notice they are near a sleeping Tyrannosaurus rex. Despite Reuben, along with Xavier, telling her not to, she activates the raft, attracting its attention. They manage to get in the raft and escape, pursued by the T. rex, which knocks them out of it. He manages to avoid the dinosaur and regroups with Teresa and Xavier after getting through a rock formation it cannot follow. He briefly thinks Isabella was killed, but finds she survived by hiding under the overturned raft, and the T. rex gives up its pursuit.

That night, the family makes it to the village and reunites with the remains of the team, but are held at gunpoint by Martin after Teresa accuses him of leaving her to die. When the group is attacked by Mutadons, he and his family hide in a convenience store, but are forced into an underground tunnel when the mutant dinosaurs follow them. Escaping with the help of the mercenaries and Isabella, they make it to a boat at the dock, which Reuben starts and drives the group away while one of the mercenaries diverts the Distortus rex which killed Martin after he abandoned them. When the mercenary survives his ordeal, Reuben redirects the boat to rescue him, and drives the boat away from the island, intending to return home.

=== Teresa Delgado ===
- Portrayed by: Luna Blaise

Teresa Delgado is Reuben's eldest daughter. At the time of the film, she has been accepted to New York University, and is on a sailing trip with her father, younger sister and boyfriend to have one last family adventure before she goes to college. Her father Reuben disapproves of her boyfriend Xavier, and she tries to defend him. Like her sister, Teresa is afraid of dinosaurs and is openly hostile against them. When their sailboat is capsized by the Mosasaurus, she and her family are stranded on it until they are rescued the next morning by a team of mercenaries on a mission to retrieve DNA samples from three dinosaurs, including the Mosasaurus. After her father tells them the boat was capsized by the prehistoric creature they are looking for, she and her family are left below deck while the team retrieves its DNA.

However, when the ship is attacked by a group of Spinosaurus that hunt alongside the Mosasaurus, her father tells her to use the radio to call for help. She tries to, but is stopped from doing so by the team's benefactor, Martin Krebs, who wants the mission to remain secret. She pushes Martin, but stumbles and falls overboard. When she calls for Martin to help her, he does not, and she falls out. Xavier jumps out after her to save her, and does so, pulling her to a rock formation near the island, and they are shortly joined by her father and sister.

After they reach the island through a cave, she tells her family that Martin was trying to kill her (despite him not doing so), and they follow geothermal pipes to get to the center of the island where the team told them there is a village. Along the way, Xavier mentions having weed, which she quickly plays off as him joking, though it's unclear if he was. Her father doesn't appreciate it, but does appreciate him saving her life, and assures him he's good enough even if he doesn't know why Teresa likes him.

On the way to the village, Teresa and her family arrive at a river and see a shed on the other side. She goes across and finds an emergency raft inside, but is nearly attacked by a Dilophosaurus which flees after noticing a sleeping Tyrannosaurus rex. When she activates the raft against Reuben and Xavier's warnings, the T. rex wakes up and notices them as they try to leave in the raft, and pursues them. She is knocked out of the raft but manages to get through a rock formation that the T. rex cannot follow, and reunites with her family.

That night, the family arrive at the village and regroup with the remaining mercenaries, during which Teresa reveals that Martin let her fall overboard, causing Martin to take the collected DNA samples and hold the group at gunpoint. They are then attacked by Mutadons, and she and her family hide in a convenience store, eventually escaping into an underground tunnel where they are reunited with a couple of the mercenaries and trapped by the pursuing animals. After escaping the tunnel and trapping the animals inside, they head for a boat at the dock, picking up the samples from the now-dead Martin along the way. After one of the mercenaries diverts the Distortus rex which killed Martin away from them, the rest of the group make it to the boat, and after recovering him, the group leaves the island.

=== Isabella Delgado ===
- Portrayed by: Audrina Miranda

Isabella Delgado is Reuben's youngest daughter. Like her family, she initially has a fear of all of dinosaurs. Along with her father, her older sister Teresa and Teresa's boyfriend Xavier, she goes on a sailing trip as one last family vacation before Teresa goes to college. However, their boat is capsized by the Mosasaurus, and they are left to drift for a night until they are rescued by a crew of mercenaries attempting to extract the DNA of certain dinosaurs, including the Mosasaurus. She and her family are left below deck while the team, following the Mosasaurus, extracts its DNA. They notice the ship chasing the Mosasaurus, and she is scared by it.

However, when the ship is attacked by a group of Spinosaurus accompanying the Mosasaurus, she witnesses one of the crew being killed when he tries to fight back, and afterward, her sister is knocked off the ship and her boyfriend jumps off to help her. Isabella and her father jump overboard to join them, and reunite with them near the island. After getting onto the island, Teresa tells them that Martin Krebs, the mission's benefactor, knocked her overboard. They decide to follow geothermal pipes in the hope they will lead to the workers' village that the mercenaries mentioned.

On the way, they encounter an Aquilops, which scares Isabella before her father pointed out that it is an herbivore then scared off by Teresa. That night, the Aquilops finds them again, and stays after Isabella gives the ceratopsian a piece of licorice, not fearing of the small herbivorous dinosaur. The next morning, when they move on, it stays and Isabella names it Dolores, in times being her sentinel, warning her nearby carnivorous dinosaurs. When the family reaches a river which has a shed on the other side, Dolores runs away. Teresa finds an emergency raft in the shed but accidentally wakes up a nearby sleeping Tyrannosaurus rex by activating it, and they flee, pursued by the T. rex. They are knocked out of the raft by it and Isabella disappears. When the others manage to get past a nearby rock formation where the dinosaur cannot follow, she is revealed to be alive, having survived by hiding under the overturned raft, and is pulled through before the T. rex gets her.

That night, the family arrive at the workers' village, reuniting with the team, but Martin holds them all at gunpoint after Teresa calls him out for leaving her to die. They are then attacked by Mutadons, and Isabella and her family hide in a convenience store, where Isabella encounters Dolores again, taking her along when they are forced into an underground tunnel. After the Mutadons follow them in, they reunite with the mercenaries and are saved by Zora, who kills one of the dinosaurs. However, they are trapped on one side of a locked gate by the Mutadons, with the Distortus rex that killed Martin on the other side. Isabella, being small and the only one who can fit through, pushes through the gate to the controls on the other side and opens it for the others, and the mercenaries manage to close it quickly, trapping the Mutadons inside. Taking Dolores with her again, Isabella goes with her family and the mercenaries to a boat at the dock, where after one of them diverts the Distortus rex, they leave the island.

=== Xavier Dobbs ===
- Portrayed by: David Iacono

Xavier Dobbs is Teresa Delgado's boyfriend. He accompanies Teresa, her father and her sister on one last family vacation before she goes off to college. Her father initially dislikes him due to his laziness. His first appearance has him refusing to help steer the boat, claiming to be tired, to Reuben's displeasure, while Teresa tries to defend him. However, when the boat is capsized by the Mosasaurus, he, stuck below deck, attempts to escape with Reuben's help, but is unable to find the emergency radio they can use to make a distress call. While Reuben eventually tells him to forget the radio and just save himself, he does not, managing to get the radio out and to the family before joining them on the capsized boat.

The next day, they are rescued by a group of mercenaries on a mission to retrieve the DNA of certain dinosaurs, including the Mosasaurus. After Reuben tells them why the boat capsized, they track the Mosasaurus and collect its DNA while Xavier and the family are below deck. Xavier, like Isabella, becomes unnerved while the ship chases the Mosasaurus, and Reuben tries to calm them. He is also uncomfortable with Martin Krebs, correctly suspecting him being corrupt. When the group is attacked by a group of Spinosaurus hunting with the Mosasaurus, Teresa falls overboard, and he immediately grabs a kickboard and life jacket and jumps in to save her, getting her to a nearby rock formation and shortly afterward being joined by Reuben and Isabella. Getting to the island, he finds out that she was pushed overboard by Martin Krebs, the team's benefactor. When Reuben asks if anyone has anything that can help, he claims he has weed, which Reuben dislikes, though Teresa claims he was just joking.

While following geothermal pipes to get to the workers' village mentioned by the mercenaries, the group stops for a night, and Reuben thanks him for saving Teresa. When he confides his worry about not being good enough for her, Reuben reassures him that he is. Shortly afterward, Xavier leaves to urinate, and once a safe distance away he is stalked by two Velociraptors, but one is attacked and killed by a Mutadon, causing the other to flee, before they can attack him.

The next day, the family gets to a river with a shed on the other side, which Teresa crosses to find an emergency raft. They notice a Tyrannosaurus rex sleeping nearby, and he and Reuben tell her not to open the raft, but she does, waking the dinosaur, which notices them as they float down the river. It chases them, but they escape through a rock formation it cannot follow.

That night, they arrive at the village, where they reunite with the remaining mercenaries. Teresa reveals to them what Martin did, which causes Martin to hold the group at gunpoint. They are then attacked by Mutadons, and he and the family hide in a nearby convenience store, escaping into an underground tunnel when they are spotted. In the tunnel, they are saved by the mercenaries, who manage to trap the other Mutadons within. After Martin is killed by the Distortus rex, the rest of the group heads for a boat at the dock, while one of the mercenaries lures the dinosaur away. They take the boat, rescue the one who lured it away after it leaves, and leave the island.

The character was specifically conceived by writer David Koepp to be initially unlikable. Iacono tried to strongly emphasize this trait early in filming, to the point that director Gareth Edwards asked him to scale back. Iacono recalled that Edwards "was, like, 'You're doing great. But I don't want people to hate you too much because we need to win them back over by the end. So if you can be a little bit more likable, that would be appreciated.'"

=== LeClerc ===
- Portrayed by: Béchir Sylvain

LeClerc is a mercenary who is the co-pilot and deckhand of the Essex. He has a close friendship with Nina, and speaks almost exclusively in French due to being Haitian. On the boat, headed to the island where the samples are to be collected, he falls asleep, leaving Duncan on watch all night, though he promises to make it up to him. When forced to flee the Mosasaurus, LeClerc is sent to the engine room, as the engines are overheating as Duncan drives the ship faster, and as a result is the only one still on board, aside from Duncan, when the ship crashes on the island. After Nina is killed by a Spinosaurus he takes her bloody scarf, and accompanies the team when they recover a sample from the Titanosaurus. When recovering the third sample, from a Quetzalcoatlus egg, he, Zora and Henry rappel down the side of a cliff to reach its nest, and he remains outside to secure the way back up by removing dangerous rocks and hammering in handholds. Unfortunately, the parent Quetzalcoatlus, attracted by the noise, returns to the nest and attacks Zora and Henry when it sees them with its eggs. LeClerc distracts it by throwing his hammer at its head, which causes it to come after him instead, and he screams for Duncan and Martin to pull him up. Unfortunately, the Quetzalcoatlus climbs after him, and by the time he gets to the top it has gotten him in its mouth. It then swallows him whole, still alive, in front of Duncan and Martin. After escaping it and getting the sample, Duncan expresses sadness at his death.

=== Nina ===
- Portrayed by: Philippine Velge

Nina is a mercenary who is the co-pilot and deckhand of the Essex. She has a close friendship with LeClerc. On the boat, headed to the island where the samples are to be collected, she serves as lookout, letting Zora know when to collect the sample from the Mosasaurus. When the boat is attacked by a group of Spinosaurus accompanying the Mosasaurus, she is nearly killed when knocked off her post, but survives and makes it to the island. However, when pushing a raft full of supplies to the island, she does not notice a Spinosaurus on the beach, and when she goes behind the raft to get it ashore, she is grabbed from behind and eaten, leaving behind only her scarf, which is picked up by LeClerc.

=== Bobby Atwater ===
- Portrayed by: Ed Skrein

Bobby Atwater is a mercenary and head of security on board the Essex. He is first met when Zora and Martin meet with Duncan, playing with some kids, and appears to be in on the scheme to haggle for more money, which they tell him is unnecessary. He is briefly implied to have a romantic past with Zora. On the expedition, when the team receives the mayday call from the Delgado family, he is the only one other than Martin who wants to ignore it in favor of completing the mission. He also disagrees with Henry Loomis over killing dinosaurs, when he reveals he brought a gun which shoots neurotoxins to deal with any threats. When the boat is attacked by a group of Spinosaurus, hunting alongside the Mosasaurus, he attempts to shoot them. As he is firing at one of them as it swims near the boat he fails to notice another coming up behind him and it leaps from the water to snatch him off of Duncan's boat. He tries to save himself by grabbing a doorway, but is quickly pulled off and taken out to sea and eaten by the Spinosaurus in front of a horrified Isabella Delgado. Zora expresses grief at his death.

Koepp initially planned to feature Bobby more heavily, having him eventually partner with Martin to betray the other characters. According to Koepp, "I was just typing one day and the thing leaped out of the water and ate him and I'm like, well, he's gone."

== Appearing in Battle at Big Rock ==
These characters only appear in the short film, Battle at Big Rock (2019), which focuses on a family encountering dinosaurs during a camping trip.

- Dennis (André Holland) and Mariana (Natalie Martinez) are the parents of the family.
- Kadasha (Melody Hurd) is Dennis's daughter and Mariana's stepdaughter.
- Mateo (Pierson Salvador) is Mariana's son and Dennis's stepson.
- Greg (Chris Finlayson) is a friend of the family.

== Video games ==
Cast members from The Lost World: Jurassic Park, including Jeff Goldblum and Richard Attenborough, reprised their roles through voice acting in the 1997 video game Chaos Island: The Lost World. Attenborough also lent his voice to the 1998 video game Trespasser.

The cast of Jurassic World provided their voices for the 2015 video game Lego Jurassic World. In addition, Bryce Dallas Howard, BD Wong, Sam Neill, Laura Dern, and Goldblum reprised their roles for the 2018 game Jurassic World Evolution.

== See also ==
- List of films featuring dinosaurs
