= The Hurler: A Campion's Tale =

2023 Irish comedy film

- Film poster
- Directed by: Tony Kelly
- Written by: Tony Kelly
- Produced by: Tony Kelly
- Starring: Tony Kelly, Elva Trill, Jon Kenny, Sophie Vavasseur
- Production companies: Dicemen, Lovely Hurling Productions
- Release date: 6 October 2023
- Running time: 98 minutes
- Country: Ireland
- Language: English

The Hurler: A Campion's Tale is a 2023 Irish comedy film written and directed by Tony Kelly. The film follows a former inter-county hurler whose career collapses after a doping scandal and who later attempts to rebuild his reputation by coaching a struggling local team. The film has been reviewed by Film Ireland.

== Plot ==
Gar Campion is a celebrated hurler whose professional and personal fortunes decline after he fails a performance-enhancing drug test. Facing public scorn, he accepts an opportunity to coach a hapless local hurling team in Waterford in order to salvage his reputation and finds himself confronting both sporting and relational challenges, including reconnecting with a former love interest.

== Production ==
Kelly came up with the character of Gar around 2013, while he was performing standup. He later developed a web series based around the character, which the Echo Live describes as well received. A first attempt to create a film was unsuccessful, prompting Kelly to turn the script into a on-man stage show. Principal photography took place in Ireland, and Kelly worked with Kilkenny-based production companies Dicemen and Lovely Hurling Productions on the project.

Marty Morrissey was confirmed as acting in the film alongside Kelly.

== Release ==
The film was released in Ireland in October 2023. Media coverage accompanied its release, with discussion focusing on its portrayal of Irish sporting culture and community life.

== Reception ==
In a review for Film Ireland, critic Adelaide Thermes Kane described the film as a sports comedy rooted in Irish hurling culture, noting its use of mockumentary-style elements and its adaptation from Tony Kelly's earlier web series. The review highlighted the film’s consistent comic tone while following familiar conventions in the sports underdog genre.

The Irish Daily Mail also reviewed the film on its release, noting its reliance on sporting humour and Irish cultural references and its place within the tradition of domestic sports comedies.

== Recognition ==
The Hurler: A Campion's Tale was longlisted for possible nomination in several categories ahead of the 2023 Irish Film & Television Awards (IFTAs).
