= Owen Grady =

- Jurassic Park character
- Chris Pratt as Owen Grady in Jurassic World (2015)
- First appearance: Jurassic World (film; 2015)
- Last appearance: Jurassic World Dominion (film; 2022)
- Created by: Colin Trevorrow
- Portrayed by: Chris Pratt
- Voiced by: Chris Pratt (Lego Jurassic World, Lego Dimensions); A.J. LoCascio (Lego Jurassic World: The Indominus Escape, Jurassic World Evolution, Jurassic World Evolution 2); Ian Hanlin (Lego Jurassic World: The Secret Exhibit, Lego Jurassic World: Legend of Isla Nublar, Lego Jurassic World: Double Trouble)

In-universe information
- Gender: Male
- Occupation: Ethologist (dinosaur researcher); Velociraptor handler U.S. Navy officer (retired)
- Significant other: Claire Dearing
- Children: Maisie Lockwood (adoptive daughter)

Owen Grady is a fictional character in the Jurassic Park franchise. He is introduced in the fourth film Jurassic World (2015), which is also the first installment in the Jurassic World trilogy. Colin Trevorrow directed and co-wrote the film, casting Chris Pratt as Owen. He is one of the three main protagonists in the trilogy, along with his love interest Claire Dearing (portrayed by Bryce Dallas Howard), and his adoptive daughter, Maisie Lockwood (portrayed by Isabella Sermon), who made her debut in Jurassic World: Fallen Kingdom. Owen is a U.S. Navy veteran and animal behavioral scientist and Velociraptor-researcher at the dinosaur theme park Jurassic World, located on Isla Nublar. By the end of Jurassic World, he and Claire begin a relationship.

Pratt reprised the role in the film's sequels. In Jurassic World: Fallen Kingdom (2018), he and Claire have broken off their relationship, and she is leading an effort to save the Isla Nublar dinosaurs from a volcanic eruption. Owen agrees to join her rescue mission so he can save Blue, the last survivor of his old raptor group, with whom he has a close connection. Later in the film, he and Claire reconcile and become adoptive parents to Maisie Lockwood, the biogenetic granddaughter of Benjamin Lockwood. In Jurassic World Dominion (2022), Owen and Claire remain in a relationship and are raising Maisie, who is kidnapped by Biosyn for research purposes along with Blue's asexually reproduced baby, Beta. The couple then embark on a rescue mission to retrieve them from Biosyn.

The concept of a raptor handler was conceived as early as 2004, by Jurassic World executive producer Steven Spielberg. He was disappointed with early drafts that featured the animals being trained for missions, although he believed the idea still had potential. Trevorrow was hired as the film's director and co-writer in 2013, and incorporated Spielberg's idea while scaling it back.

Owen Grady is among Pratt's most popular roles. The character has overall received a mixed to positive reception from critics. While some reviews criticized the films for not fully utilizing Pratt's skill as a comic actor and Owen's minimal characterization garnered mixed reactions, Pratt's overall performance has been well-received, and some consider Owen to be one of the best Jurassic Park characters.

== Fictional background ==
=== Jurassic World ===
In Jurassic World, Owen is a U.S. Navy veteran who works as an on-site animal behaviorist at Jurassic World, a dinosaur theme park located on the island of Isla Nublar. Owen and his friend, Barry, are studying four Velociraptors on the island, on behalf of InGen Security and its chief, Hoskins. Their research is done to test the raptors' intelligence, although they oppose Hoskins's long-term goal to use the animals as military weapons. Owen explains that his relationship with the raptors is a personal one and that they only respond to him under controlled conditions.

He was once romantically attracted to Claire Dearing, the park's operations manager, though their conflicting personalities ended a potential relationship after one date. To increase park attendance, Jurassic World has created a genetically modified hybrid dinosaur, the Indominus rex. Owen opposes this idea, believing that existing dinosaurs should be impressive enough. He criticizes the Indominus rex's paddock, which provides no social interaction. When the Indominus escapes, Owen unsuccessfully demands that the animal be lethally hunted. He then helps Claire find her nephews, Zach and Gray Mitchell, who are visiting the island and have become lost. During a Pterosaur breakout, Claire saves Owen from a Dimorphodon attack, and they reconnect romantically with a kiss.

When Hoskins decides to have the raptors hunt the Indominus, Owen reluctantly agrees on the condition that he commands the operation. The plan backfires when the Indominus usurps Owen as the raptor pack's alpha. The raptors turn on Hoskins' mercenary team, and one of the animals is killed in the process. Later, Owen re-establishes his bond with the surviving raptors, two of which die while attacking the Indominus. The latter is eventually killed, and the last surviving raptor, a female named Blue, is left on the island. Owen and Claire decide that they will remain together.

=== Jurassic World: Fallen Kingdom ===
In Jurassic World: Fallen Kingdom, three years have passed since the Jurassic World incident. Owen and Claire have ended their relationship, and he is building a cabin. He joins Claire on a team mission to save the Isla Nublar dinosaurs, especially Blue, from a volcanic eruption. The team realizes they have been double-crossed by Ken Wheatley and his contractor Eli Mills, the assistant of Benjamin Lockwood.

Owen and Claire travel to the Lockwood Estate in northern California, where they meet Lockwood's nine-year-old granddaughter, Maisie. They also learn that Mills is illegally auctioning the dinosaurs, having murdered Benjamin Lockwood to carry out his plan. Owen disrupts the auction and engages in a fist fight with several guards to prevent a new genetically modified hybrid, the Indoraptor, from being shipped out. Mills and Henry Wu also try to engineer another Indoraptor with improved behavioral modifications based on Owen's past research on Blue and her siblings. When the Indoraptor escapes, it injures Claire's leg and pursues Maisie. Despite her injury, Claire tells Owen to leave her and protect Maisie from the Indoraptor, kissing him before he departs. The Indoraptor is eventually killed, and Blue is left to roam freely. Maisie releases the other captive dinosaurs to save them from a hydrogen cyanide leak. Owen and Claire reconcile their relationship, and become adoptive parents to Maisie, who is revealed to be a genetic clone of Lockwood's deceased daughter.

=== Jurassic World Dominion ===
In the four years after Fallen Kingdom, Owen and Claire have lived with Maisie in their cabin, located in the Sierra Nevada mountains. He and Claire protect dinosaurs from poachers. To Maisie's frustration, they have also kept her away from civilization, as she is wanted by genetic companies for research due to her clone status. They struggle to decide if Maisie should return to society in order for her to have a life yet fearing of losing her. Owen is reunited with Blue, who has set up her nest nearby and has now had a daughter, Beta, through asexual reproduction.

Maisie and Beta are kidnapped by poachers and sold to Biosyn. Owen promises Blue that he will get her daughter back for her, during which Blue wounds his right hand out of rage and desperation, but she trusts him to do so. He and Claire track them to a black market in Malta, where Barry, now a French intelligence agent, aids them. Dinosaurs escape when the black market is disrupted. Owen interrogates Maisie's kidnapper Rainn Delacourt on her whereabouts, but fails to get a clear answer. Owen is chased on motorcycle by an Atrociraptor pack, while Claire learns that Maisie and Beta have been taken to Biosyn's headquarters in Italy. Owen and Claire travel there, with help from pilot Kayla Watts, and rescue the two. In addition, the family joins with Alan Grant, Ellie Sattler, Ian Malcolm, and Ramsay Cole on escaping Biosyn. Owen is also revealed to be a fan of the original Jurassic Park survivors, especially Grant, and has studied his publications. He returns Beta to Blue and shares a final look with her before she runs off into the wilderness. He then settles into life together with Claire and Maisie.

== Production background ==
Jurassic World underwent a lengthy development period. By 2004, writers William Monahan and John Sayles had written drafts that featured Nick Harris, a former mercenary who takes a job training a team of five Deinonychus to go on missions. This idea was suggested by executive producer Steven Spielberg, who believed that it still had potential despite rejecting the early drafts.

In 2012, Rick Jaffa and Amanda Silver were hired to write a draft, which again featured raptors being trained for missions. Colin Trevorrow was hired as director in 2013, and wrote a new script with co-writer Derek Connolly, with Jaffa and Silver also getting credit. Trevorrow and Connolly retained the idea of a raptor handler, but scaled it back. Jaffa and Silver's draft featured a raptor tamer named Vance, who actively supported the militarization of the raptors from the beginning of the story. Trevorrow disagreed with this, saying "if anyone's gonna militarize raptors that's what the bad guy does, he's insane".

Josh Brolin was an early candidate for the role of Owen, but ultimately did not receive an offer, according to Trevorrow. Brolin later said that he turned it down as he could not imagine himself in the role. Trevorrow had been impressed by Chris Pratt's acting in the 2012 film Zero Dark Thirty. Pratt was known for his role as Andy Dwyer on the comedy series Parks and Recreation. Universal Pictures and Spielberg wanted to cast him, but Trevorrow was not entirely convinced, due to Pratt's popularity as a comedic actor: "I really love improvisational comedic actors and you see them in my films again and again [...] and so I just wanted to make sure that I wasn't bringing him in because that was comfort zone for me". Pratt, who would ultimately get the part, had previously joked in 2010 that Spielberg had cast him in the film. Pratt was cast prior to the 2014 release of Guardians of the Galaxy, which propelled him to movie stardom. Trevorrow said at the time of his casting, "we had no idea he'd become as big a star as he has. I just cast a bunch of character actors, as all Jurassic Park movies have. And somehow we ended up with a movie star".

Pratt and Trevorrow described Owen as a combination of Dr. Alan Grant (portrayed by Sam Neill) and Dr. Ian Malcolm (Jeff Goldblum), with Pratt stating: "He's got a little bit of the Goldblum cynicism but also the Sam Neill excitement at the wonder of the biology of it". Pratt devised a backstory in which Owen trained dolphins for the U.S. Navy, before taking the job at Jurassic World. As research for his role as a raptor handler, Pratt spent time with Hollywood animal trainer Randy Miller. Owen's use of clicker training and his posture toward the raptors were both inspired by Miller. Trevorrow wanted the film's characters to have distinct appearances. For Owen, costume designer Daniel Orlandi came up with the leather vest.

A fan theory in 2015 speculated that Owen is the adult version of a boy from the original film, who is educated by Grant about velociraptors. Pratt eventually denied the theory.

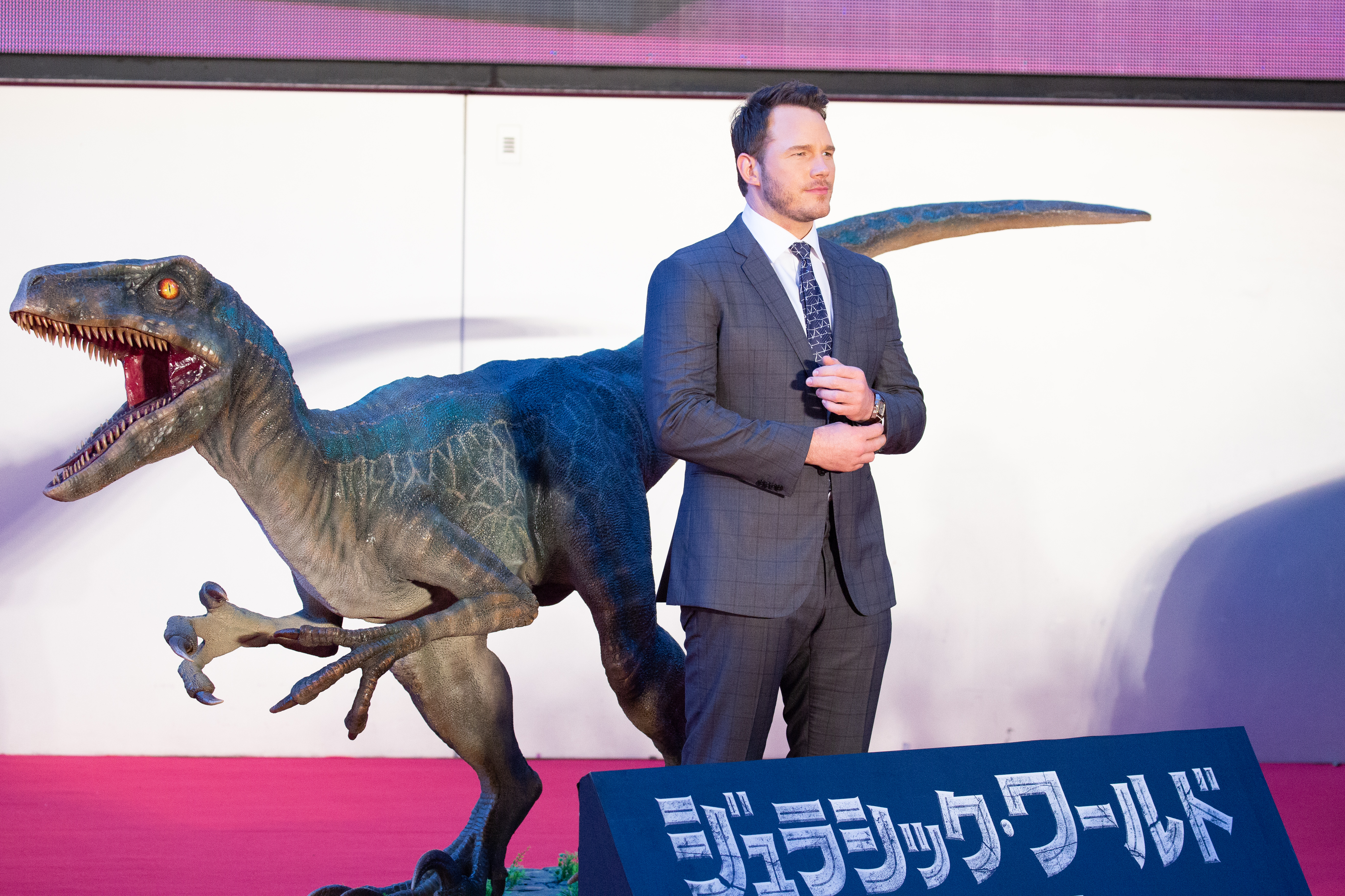
Chris Pratt with a statue of Blue at the Japanese premiere of Fallen Kingdom

Fallen Kingdom (2018) was directed by J. A. Bayona, with Trevorrow and Connolly returning as co-writers. Each scene involving Owen was discussed between Bayona and Pratt ahead of filming, and most of Pratt's suggestions were used in the film. The fight between Owen and guards at the dinosaur auction was improvised, as were Owen and Claire's kissing scenes in the first two films. Pratt said that the events of Jurassic World ultimately led to Owen and Claire's breakup by the time that Fallen Kingdom takes place, saying that "Claire feels as though she has to do something to make it right and Owen feels as though there's no way to make it right, so you have to move on. I think that's the thing that destroyed us". Pratt compared his character's relationship with Blue to that of a parent and child.

Aside from the films, Pratt also reprised the role for the theme park attractions Jurassic World: The Ride and VelociCoaster, opened in 2019 and 2021, respectively. Owen also appears in the video games Jurassic World Evolution (2018) and Jurassic World Evolution 2 (2021), voiced by A.J. LoCascio.

In April 2023, it was announced that the Jurassic Park and characters from it would be featured in the upcoming video game, Funko Fusion, set to be released in 2024. The game is set to include Owen Grady, as well as Claire Dearing.

== Reception ==
Owen Grady is among Pratt's most popular roles. Reviewing the first Jurassic World film, Peter Bradshaw of The Guardian wrote that Pratt "gives a tremendously likeable performance as Owen: easy-going, relaxed, somewhere on a continuum between Harrison Ford and Tom Hanks". Tom Chapman of Screen Rant wrote, "On paper, the idea of trained Raptors sounded ridiculous, but thankfully, Trevorrow's script and Pratt's performance pulled it off". Robbie Collin of The Daily Telegraph stated that Pratt and Howard "have a playful Princess Leia/Han Solo-ish chemistry".

Some reviews criticized the film for not fully utilizing Pratt's skill as a comic actor. Peter Travers of Rolling Stone wrote that Pratt "aces it as an action hero and invests his sexual banter with a comic flair the movie could have used more of". Jake Coyle of the Associated Press found that Pratt "focuses more on smoldering and looking earnest than calling on the witty persona from 'Guardians of the Galaxy,' a big waste of his natural gifts". Writing for USA Today, Brian Truitt stated that Pratt "is again another roguish action hero, though this one's much more lacking in that mold than his Guardians of the Galaxy character". John Anderson of Time wrote that Pratt portrayed Owen with "predictable charm and unexpected authority", and further stated that viewers familiar with his roles in Parks and Recreation and Guardians of the Galaxy "will be surprised by the way he inhabits the action-hero persona".

Reviews again criticized the character in Fallen Kingdom, with Jesse Hassenger of The A.V. Club writing "these movies continue to inexplicably squander Pratt's abilities as a comic actor". Travers called Pratt a "rare movie star with a comic's sense of mischief", and questioned why he was cast in the role only to be reduced to "a pawn who runs around hitting his marks like a robot devoid of personality". Travis M. Andrews of The Washington Post opined that the film "wastes the charms of Pratt, whose role in the 'Guardians of the Galaxy' films proves he can balance comedy, empathy and action with ease. Here, he's too busy running, jumping and expertly disarming trained soldiers to deploy a personality".

Owen Gleiberman, writing for Variety, stated that Pratt "tones down the dude factor and exudes a lean-and-mean sincerity" in Fallen Kingdom. Brian Bishop of The Verge considered Pratt's "familiar dumb-guy schtick" to be as equally entertaining as in Parks and Recreation and Guardians of the Galaxy. However, he found Pratt's scenes with Howard to be "largely chemistry-free" while stating that "one romantic moment plays as shockingly unearned". Regarding Dominion, Nick Bartlett of /Film wrote: "After two films insisting that this is the coolest character ever to walk the planet, Owen is uncharacteristically dour and somber, with a pretty flat performance from Pratt. Like or loathe him, he was a charismatic, dynamic presence in the previous films". Bartlett said that, possibly due to the film's large cast, Pratt "barely registers as a character anymore. It seems like he's phoning it in".

In Jurassic World, Owen keeps his raptors calm by extending his hands out toward them. The pose developed into a meme in 2015, with zookeepers performing the same gesture toward modern animals. In Dominion, he uses this gesture on other dinosaurs as well, and teaches other characters to do the same near the end of the film when capturing Beta. Reviewing Dominion, Alonso Duralde of TheWrap criticized the number of instances in which Owen "controls, or attempts to control, a dinosaur by sticking his hand out in front of him. That's the bulk of Pratt's forgettable performance". Bartlett likewise found that the hand gesture "gets old very quickly. This was introduced in 'Jurassic World' as a way to pacify the Velociraptors that he had specifically trained, but now, it somehow works on all dinosaurs? It happens way too frequently and provides the basis for a particularly hackneyed attempt at pathos towards the end of the film". Anne Victoria Clark of Vulture found that the hand gesture makes sense, noting that modern predators can be intimidated by people using their hands. For Dominion, Pratt jokingly suggested that his character have one of his hands bitten off.

== See also ==
- List of Jurassic Park characters
