= Claire Dearing =

- Jurassic World character
- Bryce Dallas Howard as Claire Dearing in Jurassic World (2015).
- First appearance: Jurassic World (film; 2015)
- Last appearance: Jurassic World Dominion (film; 2022)
- Created by: Colin Trevorrow
- Portrayed by: Bryce Dallas Howard
- Voiced by: Bryce Dallas Howard (Lego Jurassic World, Lego Dimensions, Jurassic World Evolution, Jurassic World Evolution 2); Britt McKillip (Lego Jurassic World: The Secret Exhibit, Lego Jurassic World: Legend of Isla Nublar, Lego Jurassic World: Double Trouble)

In-universe information
- Occupation: Park operations manager (Jurassic World); Activist (later films)
- Significant other: Owen Grady
- Children: Maisie Lockwood (adopted daughter)
- Relatives: Karen Mitchell (sister); Scott Mitchell (brother-in-law); Zach Mitchell (nephew); Gray Mitchell (nephew)

Claire Dearing is a fictional character in the Jurassic Park franchise. She is introduced in the fourth film Jurassic World (2015), which is also the first installment in the Jurassic World trilogy. Colin Trevorrow directed and co-wrote the film, casting Bryce Dallas Howard as Claire. She is one of the three main protagonists in the Jurassic World trilogy, along with her love interest Owen Grady (portrayed by Chris Pratt), and her adopted daughter, Maisie Lockwood (portrayed by Isabella Sermon). In the first film, Claire is the operations manager of Jurassic World, a dinosaur theme park located on Isla Nublar.

Howard reprised the role for the film's sequels. In Jurassic World: Fallen Kingdom (2018), Claire is the founder and leader of the Dinosaur Protection Group (DPG), an organization dedicated to saving the Isla Nublar dinosaurs from a volcanic eruption. Claire and Owen have broken off their relationship, but reconcile after she recruits him to join the rescue mission. They also adopt Maisie, the clone of Benjamin Lockwood's daughter. In Jurassic World Dominion (2022), Claire and Owen remain a couple and are raising Maisie in seclusion to protect her from genetic companies eager to study her. When Maisie is kidnapped by Biosyn, Claire and Owen embark on a rescue mission.

Claire Dearing is among Howard's most popular roles. The character received a mixed to positive reception from critics. Howard's overall performance has been well-received, and some consider Claire to be one of the best Jurassic Park characters.

== Fictional background ==
=== Jurassic World ===
In the first film, Claire is the park operations manager at the dinosaur theme-park Jurassic World, located on the island of Isla Nublar. She is a workaholic and barely has time for her visiting nephews, Zach and Gray Mitchell. Claire's sister Karen urges her to have children some day, insisting it is worth it. Claire had a date with the park's Velociraptor researcher Owen Grady before the events of the film, but they did not pursue a relationship due to their conflicting personalities and lifestyles.

To increase park attendance, Jurassic World has created a genetically modified hybrid dinosaur, the Indominus rex. Claire is initially dismissive of Owen's warnings regarding the Indominus. Later, despite Owen's objections, Claire accompanies him to search for the Indominus and her nephews, who went on their own to explore the park. While Owen comforts a dying Apatosaurus that had been attacked by the Indominus, Claire emotionally bonds with it, altering her view of the park's dinosaurs as "assets".

During a pterosaur breakout, she rescues Owen from a Dimorphodon attack. They share a kiss, which is cut short by Claire's reunion with Zach and Gray. Claire later lures the park's Tyrannosaurus into a fight with the Indominus, which is eventually killed in battle. Claire reunites with Karen and decides to be with Owen after seeing her sister with her family.

=== Jurassic World: Fallen Kingdom ===
In Jurassic World: Fallen Kingdom, Claire and Owen have ended their relationship and she is leading the Dinosaur Protection Group (DPG), an organization she founded that is dedicated to saving the Isla Nublar dinosaurs from a volcanic eruption. To complete this task, she partners with Benjamin Lockwood, who helped to create an earlier dinosaur attraction known as Jurassic Park. Claire convinces Owen to join the rescue mission by reminding him that Blue, a Velociraptor he raised, is still on the island.

Claire and her team later discover that Lockwood's aide, Eli Mills, is illegally auctioning the dinosaurs, and they work to stop him from shipping a new hybrid prototype, the Indoraptor. Claire and Owen also meet Maisie Lockwood, the orphaned granddaughter of Benjamin Lockwood, learning later that she is a genetic clone of his deceased daughter. When the Indoraptor escapes, it injures Claire's leg and pursues Maisie. Despite her injury, Claire tells Owen to leave her and protect Maisie from the Indoraptor, kissing him before he departs. Later, she aids Owen and Blue in killing the Indoraptor. Claire and Owen reconcile their relationship and become adoptive parents to Maisie following the death of Benjamin Lockwood.

=== Jurassic World Dominion ===
In Jurassic World Dominion, four years have passed since Fallen Kingdom. Claire lives in the Sierra Nevada with Owen and 14-year-old Maisie, and still works to protect dinosaurs. Maisie has grown frustrated living in seclusion, which is done to protect her from genetic researchers, prompting Owen and Claire to decide whether Maisie should return to society in order for her to have a life regardless of the risks involved.

When Maisie is kidnapped on behalf of Biosyn, Claire and Owen set out to rescue her. Their search takes them to Malta, where Claire confronts Soyona Santos, a woman associated with a dinosaur black market. Claire engages in a physical fight with Santos before interrogating her, and learns that Maisie has been taken to Biosyn's headquarters in Italy. Santos unleashes her pack of Atrociraptors on Claire, although she survives with help from pilot Kayla Watts, who subsequently flies Owen and Claire to Biosyn. The couple are separated after the plane is brought down by pterosaurs. During their separation, Claire has encounters with a Therizinosaurus and a Dilophosaurus. Owen and Kayla eventually find her, and the couple are later reunited with Maisie. In addition, the family allied with Alan Grant, Ellie Sattler, Ian Malcolm, and Ramsay Cole on escaping Biosyn. Afterwards, Claire and Owen bring Maisie back home, where they settle into life together.

== Production background ==
Jurassic World was directed by Colin Trevorrow, who co-wrote the final script with Derek Connolly. In an earlier script by Rick Jaffa and Amanda Silver, the character was named Whitney and she had a smaller part compared to Claire. Whitney would serve in an adversarial role, opposing the film's raptor tamer. Trevorrow said that Whitney was the one character in the earlier script who "had the most room to grow". Trevorrow chose the name "Claire", describing it as "hard on the surface but ultimately warm and loving", while Connolly chose the surname "Dearing". According to Trevorrow, Connolly "loves those Dickensian names that suggest a bit about the character, push the viewer in the direction the author wants them to go. She may seem sharp-edged at first, but ultimately she's very endearing." Although Chris Pratt received top billing for his role as Owen, Trevorrow said that Bryce Dallas Howard has the lead role as Claire.

Trevorrow wanted the film's characters to have distinct appearances, and said about Claire, "She starts out with this snow white pristine outfit, then it all just gets completely torn apart". He stated further: "I wanted Claire to look like a white egret, and then be slowly torn apart over the course of the movie. To me, she is the park. And she's the character who really transforms". Claire uses high heels throughout the film, and Howard learned how to run in them with advice from former fighter Pete Williams, who was working for the actress as her on-set driver. The final choice in footwear was made by Howard; she envisioned Claire as someone who wears high heels at work. Suggestions were made for Howard to go barefoot later in the film while in the jungle, although she was concerned about getting tetanus. Another option was to cut off the heels upon entering the jungle, although this had already been done in the 1984 film Romancing the Stone, and Howard did not want to copy it. Howard said, "I always saw it as a really fun thing that she runs through the jungle in heels and the outfit gets totally demolished".

Discussing Claire's transition to activism, Howard described the character as someone who "was on the wrong side of history" and is now trying to "make it right". Trevorrow said that Claire "so desperately wants to do the right thing, and sometimes, the bad consequences of her good intentions can weigh on her. We wanted to explore that need for redemption, that sense of guilt, that sense of regret".

For Jurassic World Dominion (2022), Trevorrow wrote and shot Claire's encounter with the Therizinosaurus as a "quiet and still and suspenseful" scene. He noted that Claire "never really had even one sequence where it was just her alone with a dinosaur". Howard was asked by unnamed individuals to lose weight for the film, although Trevorrow rejected this idea. She recalled that Trevorrow "was like, 'There are lots of different kinds of women on this planet, and there are lots of different kinds of women in our film'". Howard performed many stunts that she said would have been impossible had she been dieting.

Across the Jurassic World trilogy, Howard was paid significantly less compared to Pratt: "When I started negotiating for Jurassic, it was 2014, and it was a different world, and I was at a great disadvantage. And, unfortunately, you have to sign up for three movies, and so your deals are set". Pratt successfully advocated for her to receive equal salary for other Jurassic World projects that they appeared in together. Howard reprised her role for the theme park attractions Jurassic World: The Ride and VelociCoaster. She also lent her voice to the video games Jurassic World Evolution (2018) and Jurassic World Evolution 2 (2021).

In April 2023, it was announced that the Jurassic Park and characters from it would be featured in the upcoming video game, Funko Fusion, set to be released in 2024. The game is set to include Claire Dearing, as well as Owen Grady.

== Reception ==
Peter Bradshaw of The Guardian praised Howard's performance in the first film. Jake Coyle of the Associated Press stated that of all the characters, Howard "makes the biggest impact as a corporate cog whose controlled world is imploding. It's not a subtle portrait — she keeps her heels throughout — but her transformation is the most convincing one in a film full of dubious evolutions". Robbie Collin of The Daily Telegraph wrote that Pratt and Howard "have a playful Princess Leia/Han Solo-ish chemistry".

Saim Cheeda of Screen Rant opined that Claire had the best character arc throughout the entire film series. Michael Haskell of MovieWeb wrote that Howard "is definitely giving it her all and seems invested in the franchise as a whole, but the character of Claire Dearing leaves a lot to be desired". Nick Bartlett of /Film considered Howard and Pratt an unconvincing couple. In Dominion, Bartlett found her most impressive when acting without Pratt, stating that Claire's dinosaur encounters are "much tenser" because she is "more fallible and more likely to get eaten than the impossibly competent Owen". He called the Therizinosaurus encounter "the most memorable and unique dinosaur set-piece of the series".

=== Sexism allegations ===
Before the release of Jurassic World, filmmaker Joss Whedon criticized a clip of the film that showed Owen and Claire arguing about the treatment of the park's dinosaurs. Whedon called the clip "'70s-era sexist", stating, "She's a stiff, he's a life-force—really? Still?" In response, Trevorrow said: "He was seeing the beginning of a slow deconstruction of those archetypes. All I could feel was, 'Look, yes, it's designed to be this way.' I don't feel that we need to surrender a woman's femininity in order for her to be a badass action hero. That was something I was interested in. I feel like I’ve seen a lot of women who are made to look very masculine and tough — and that's awesome too. But this felt like someplace I could go that might actually be new in how retro it is. So we embraced it."

After Jurassic World was released, some film critics also found its depiction of Claire to be sexist, including its push for her to become a maternal figure. According to Jordan Hoffman of Guardian US: "When Claire’s sister (Judy Greer) basically says, 'When you become a mother, you'll understand,' and Claire's response is to look guilty, it's pretty damning. As if women who do not reproduce are incapable of being good hosts to visiting relatives". Alex Abad-Santos of Vox wrote that the film "divides women into two categories, presenting the characteristics of those two categories as mutually exclusive; loving women with demanding jobs don't exist in this world, nor do tough moms". Marlow Stern, writing for The Daily Beast, found the film to be about "a woman's 'evolution' from an icy-cold, selfish corporate shill into a considerate wife and mother". The Encyclopedia of Sexism in American Films (2019) stated that Claire "is set up as the target of the audience's ire from the very beginning", writing that early scenes "nudge the audience to judge her harshly until, near the end, she adopts more traditionally 'feminine' traits".

Meredith Woerner of the Los Angeles Times wrote: "For a boss at a massive corporation, Claire commands remarkably little respect. All the other characters are pretty keen to tell Claire to lighten up, correct her, or just make her look like a joyless, compassionless drone". Devin Faraci of Birth.Movies.Death stated that the film treats Claire as "a broken person simply because she has a dedication to her job and doesn’t want kids". He noted how Claire's nephews want to hang out with Owen after she rescues him from the Dimorphodon: "It's like the kids are speaking for the filmmaker — no matter how cool Claire gets, Owen is always cooler because he's a tough man". According to Simon Abrams of The Hollywood Reporter, Claire "repeatedly proves that she's smart enough to know how Jurassic World is run, but she only really vindicates herself — from the filmmakers' chauvinist perspective — when she proves that she can keep up with Owen in the running and fighting department."

Claims of sexism extended to Claire's use of high heels, seen as non-ideal footwear for running from dinosaurs. Howard defended the heels, stating: "This character needed to seem ill-equipped to be in the jungle. She was somebody who looks like she belongs in a corporate environment for a reason because she was someone who was disconnected from the animals and disconnected from that reality and disconnected from herself. She doesn't at all expect that she's going to be tromping through the jungle." In Fallen Kingdom, Claire briefly wears high heels early in the film while at the DPG office, before switching to boots for the island rescue mission. As originally written, she was supposed to wear sneakers during the office scene, but Howard objected.

John DeFore of The Hollywood Reporter opined that Fallen Kingdom "remains old-fashioned in its treatment of Howard's character, who mostly screams and runs while Owen gets things done."

== See also ==
- List of Jurassic Park characters
