= BD Wong =

American actor (born 1960)

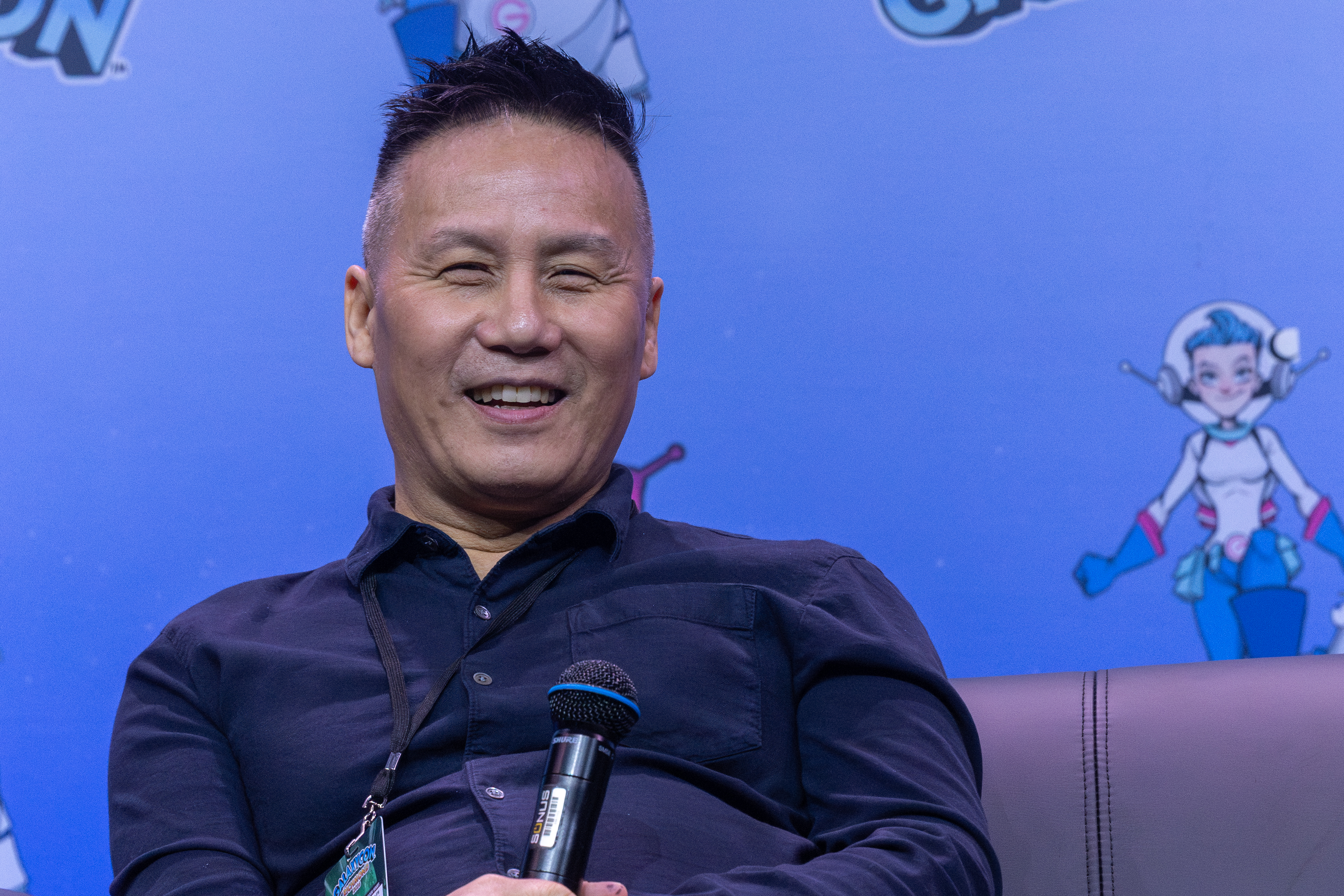
- Wong at GalaxyCon Richmond in 2026
- Born: Bradley Darryl Wong; October 24, 1960 (age 65); San Francisco, California, United States
- Other name: Bradd Wong
- Occupations: Actor; director
- Years active: 1983–present
- Spouse: Richert Schnorr (m. 2018)
- Partner: Richie Jackson (1988–2004)
- Children: 2

Chinese name
- Traditional Chinese: 黃榮亮
- Simplified Chinese: 黄荣亮
Transcriptions
Yue: Cantonese
- Jyutping: Wong^{4} Wing^{4}-loeng^{6}

Bradley Darryl Wong (born October 24, 1960) is an American actor. Wong won a Tony Award for his performance as Song Liling in M. Butterfly, becoming the only actor in Broadway history to receive the Tony Award, Drama Desk Award, Outer Critics Circle Award, Clarence Derwent Award, and Theatre World Award for the same role. For his role as Whiterose in the television series Mr. Robot, he was nominated for both a Critic's Choice Television Award and an Emmy for Outstanding Guest Actor in a Drama Series.

Wong is known for such roles as Howard Weinstein in the film Father of the Bride, Dr. George Huang on Law & Order: Special Victims Unit, Father Ray Mukada on Oz, Dr. John Lee on Awake, Dr. Henry Wu in the Jurassic Park franchise, Hugo Strange in Gotham, and Ngapoi Ngawang Jigme in the film Seven Years in Tibet. Wong is the host of the HLN medical documentary series Something's Killing Me with BD Wong. He has also done extensive voiceover work and stage acting. Wong voiced Captain Li Shang in the Disney animated film Mulan as well as its 2004 direct-to-video sequel, Mulan II, and the 2005 video game Kingdom Hearts II.

== Early life, family and education ==
Bradley Darryl Wong was born on October 24, 1960, and raised in San Francisco, California, to Roberta Christine Wong (née Leong), a telephone company supervisor, and William D. Wong, a postal worker. He has an older brother and a younger brother. He is of Chinese descent, with family from Hong Kong.

Wong attended Lincoln High School, where he discovered his love of acting and starred as the lead in numerous school plays. He attended San Francisco State University in the 1970s, where he was the only Asian American in the theater department, and there were no roles for him.

== Career ==
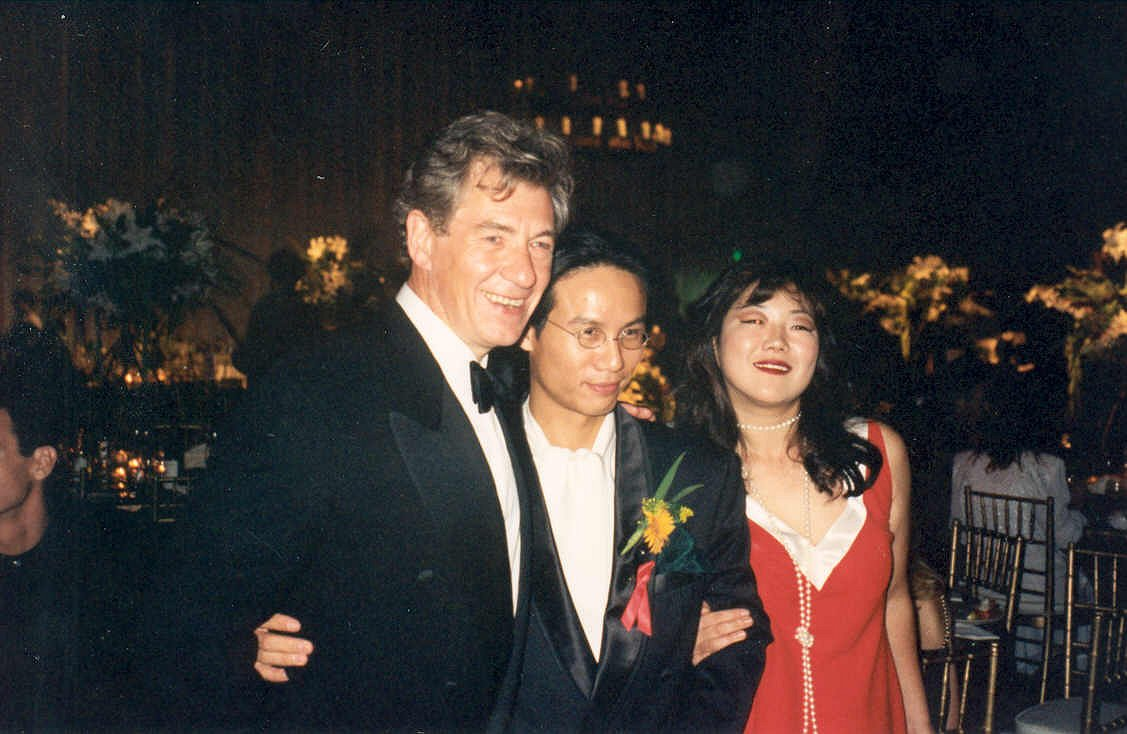
Wong with Ian McKellen and Margaret Cho at the 47th Emmy Awards, 1994

Wong gained attention as a result of his Broadway debut in M. Butterfly opposite John Lithgow. The play won multiple awards, including several for Wong. He is the only actor to be honored with the Tony Award, Drama Desk Award, Outer Critics Circle Award, Clarence Derwent Award, and Theatre World Award for the same role. At the time, he ceased using his full name in favor of his initials. He has since ceased the use of punctuation in his initials. In addition to his stint on Law & Order: Special Victims Unit as FBI psychiatrist Dr. George Huang, he has had recurring roles in All-American Girl and played Father Ray Mukada on all six seasons of Oz, with guest appearances on The X-Files and Sesame Street.

On the big screen, he has appeared in The Freshman (1990), the 1991 remake of Father of the Bride and its 1995 sequel, Father of the Bride Part II, Jurassic Park (1993), Executive Decision (1996), and Slappy and the Stinkers (1997). He also provided the voice of Captain Li Shang in Disney's Mulan (1998), its direct-to-video sequel, and the video game Kingdom Hearts II. He returned to Broadway as Linus in a 1999 revival of You're a Good Man, Charlie Brown, alongside Anthony Rapp, Roger Bart, and Kristin Chenoweth, and the 2004 revival of Stephen Sondheim's Pacific Overtures.

Wong narrated a public television documentary, "Maxine Hong Kingston: Talking Story" (1990) about the life and work of the ground-breaking Chinese American novelist. In 1990, Wong objected to Actor's Equity that the plan to use Welsh actor Jonathan Pryce in the role of The Engineer in the Broadway run of Miss Saigon, which Pryce had played since the beginning of the show's 10-year extended run in London, would take jobs away from actors of Asian descent. Although the union barred Pryce from acting the role in response to Wong's protest, vociferous opposition from Charlton Heston and a threat by the musical's creator and producer, Cameron Mackintosh, to cancel the American production entirely, induced the union to reverse course. Pryce went on to win a Tony Award for Best Actor in a Musical for the role.

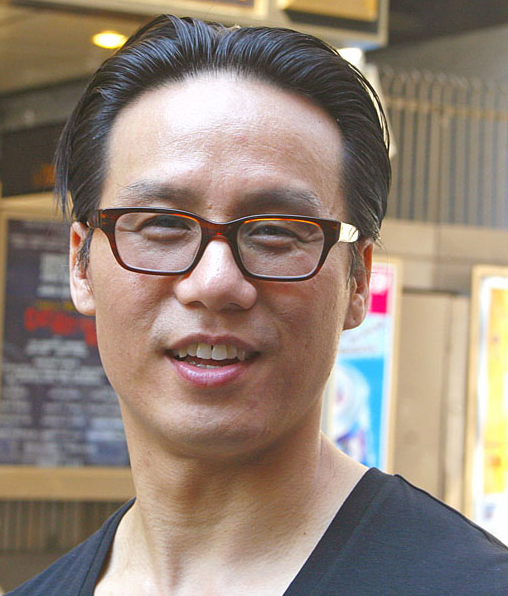
Wong in 2008

In 2008, Wong starred in the one-man show Herringbone, in which he portrayed 12 roles, at McCarter Theatre at Princeton University. He brought the show to the La Jolla Playhouse in San Diego the following year. In 2012, Wong starred in Herringbone to benefit Dixon Place in New York for two performances. The production was recorded live for a subsequent CD release. In 2014, Wong starred in the U.S. premiere of James Fenton's acclaimed adaptation of The Orphan of Zhao, a classic Chinese legend that has its roots in the fourth century BC, directed by Carey Perloff at American Conservatory Theater (A.C.T.). The Orphan of Zhao is an epic story of self-sacrifice and revenge. In the aftermath of a political coup, a country doctor is forced to sacrifice his son to save the last heir of a noble and massacred clan. The Orphan of Zhao was a co-production with La Jolla Playhouse.

Wong announced his departure from the cast of Law & Order: SVU in July 2011, to join another NBC police drama, Awake, in which he portrayed Dr. Johnathan Lee, a confrontational therapist of an LAPD detective (portrayed by Jason Isaacs) who lived in two realities. Wong guest-starred in a thirteenth season episode of Law & Order: SVU titled "Father Dearest" (which aired May 2, 2012). In 2015, he was named Artist-in-Residence at La Jolla Playhouse. Wong guest-starred on NCIS: New Orleans Episode 1.13 titled "The Walking Dead" (which aired February 3, 2015), where he portrayed Navy Lieutenant Commander Dr. Gabriel Lin.

Wong also played the enigmatic Whiterose, head of the hacker collective Dark Army, who lives a double life as Zhang, the Chinese Minister of State Security, on USA Network's Mr. Robot. He was credited as a recurring role for the show's second season and promoted to main cast for the third season, which debuted October 11, 2017. On August 13, 2017, Wong began hosting the new HLN series Something's Killing Me with BD Wong. The documentary explores strange and unexplainable, real medical ailments and attacks that may be gradual or descend rapidly. But in either case, if a cause and cure are not found immediately, these real-life patients will die. In 2022, Wong was featured in the book 50 Key Figures in Queer US Theatre, with a profile written by theatre scholar Esther Kim Lee.

== Charity work ==
Wong donates his time and resources to a number of LGBT and arts-related charities, such as the Ali Forney Center, Broadway Cares/Equity Fights AIDS, Materials for the Arts, and Rosie's Theater Kids, of which he is also a board member.

== Personal life ==
Wong was in a long-term relationship with talent agent Richie Jackson from 1988 to 2004. In 2000, the couple had twin sons through a surrogate mother using Wong's sperm and an egg donated by Jackson's sister. One of the twins, Boaz Dov Wong, died 90 minutes after birth. In 2003, Wong wrote a memoir about his experiences with surrogacy titled Following Foo: The Electronic Adventures of the Chestnut Man (ISBN 9780060529536). In 2004, Wong and Jackson ended their relationship. The two, along with Jackson's husband, Jordan Roth, co-parent their surviving gay son. On October 7, 2018, Wong married Richert John Frederickson Schnorr, his partner of eight years, in Brooklyn, New York.

== Filmography ==
=== Film ===
Year	Title	Role	Notes
1986	The Karate Kid Part II	Boy on Street	Credited as Bradd Wong
1989	Family Business	Jimmy Chiu, Adam's MIT Prof	
1990	The Freshman	Edward	
1991	Mystery Date	James Lew	
1991	Father of the Bride	Howard Weinstein	
1992	The Lounge People	Billy	
1993	Jurassic Park	Dr. Henry Wu	
1993	And the Band Played On	Kiko Govantes	
1994	The Ref	Dr. William Wong, Marriage Counselor	Aka Hostile Hostages (uncredited)
1994	Men of War	Po	
1995	Kalamazoo	Justin	
1995	Father of the Bride Part II	Howard Weinstein	
1996	Executive Decision	Sergeant Louie Jung	
1996	Joe's Apartment	Cockroach	Voice
1997	Seven Years in Tibet	Ngapoi Ngawang Jigme	
1998	Slappy and the Stinkers	Morgan Brinway	
1998	Mulan	Captain Li Shang	Voice
1998	The Substitute 2: School's Out	Warren Drummond	Straight to video
2002	The Salton Sea	Bubba	
2004	Mulan II	Shang	Direct to video; Voice
2005	Stay	Dr. Edmund Ren	
2006	Ira & Abby	Party Guest	
2012	White Frog	Oliver Young	
2015	Focus	Liyuan Tse	
2015	Jurassic World	Dr. Henry Wu	
2017	The Space Between Us	Tom Chen	
2018	Jurassic World: Fallen Kingdom	Dr. Henry Wu	
2018	Bird Box	Greg	
2022	Jurassic World Dominion	Dr. Henry Wu	
2022	Blue's Big City Adventure	Director	
2023	Heart of Stone	King of Clubs	
2023	The Monkey King	Buddha	Voice

=== Television ===
Year	Title	Role	Notes
1983	No Big Deal	Miss Karnisian's Class	TV film; as Bradd Wong
1986	Simon & Simon	Counterboy – Photo Shop Clerk	Episode: "Mobile Home of the Brave"
1987	Double Switch	Waiter	TV film
1988	Crash Course aka Driving Academy	Kichi	TV film; as Bradd Wong
1990	Goodnight Sweet Wife: A Murder in Boston aka The Charles Stuart Story	Kim Tan	TV film
1991	Alive from Off Center	Actor	Episode: "Dances in Exile"
1993	Sesame Street	Dr. Sing	4 episodes
1993	And the Band Played On	Kico Govantes	TV film
1994–1995	All-American Girl	Dr. Stuart Kim	18 episodes
1994	ABC Afterschool Specials	Johnny Angel	Episode: "Magical Make-Over"
1995	Dazzle	Teng	TV film
1995	Happily Ever After: Fairy Tales for Every Child	The Wolf; Aladdin/The Genie	Episodes: "Little Red Riding Hood" & "Aladdin"
1995	Bless This House	Johnny Chen	Episode: "Neither a Borrower Nor a Landlord Be"
1996	The X-Files	Det. Glen Chao	Episode: "Hell Money"
1997–2003	Oz	Father Ray Mukada	47 episodes
1998	Reflections on Ice: Michelle Kwan Skates to the Music of Disney's 'Mulan'	Captain Li Shang	TV film; voice
1999	Chicago Hope	Dr. Kai Chang	Episode: "Upstairs, Downstairs"
2000	Welcome to New York	Dennis	Episode: "Jim Gets a Wig"
2001–2015 & 2025–2026	Law & Order: Special Victims Unit	Dr. George Huang	Recurring role, Seasons 2 & 3, Main role, Seasons 4–12, Guest star, Seasons 13–15, 17 & 27
2002	Kim Possible	Agent Will Du	Voice; Episode: "Number One"
2004	Century City	U.S. Attorney Matthew Chin	Episode: "Pilot"
2007	Marco Polo	Pedro	TV film
2012	Awake	Dr. John Lee	Main role
2014	The Normal Heart	Buzzy	HBO film
2015	NCIS: New Orleans	Navy Lieutenant Commander Dr. Gabriel Lin	Episode: "The Walking Dead"
2015–2018	Madam Secretary	Brent Rosen	Episodes: "The Kill List", "Refuge"
2015	Nurse Jackie	Doctor Wu	Episode: "Are You with Me, Doctor Wu?"
2015–2019	Mr. Robot	Whiterose/Minister Zhi Zhang	Recurring role Seasons 1 & 2; Main role, Seasons 3 & 4 Nominated - Critics' Choice Award for Best Guest Actor/Actress in a Drama Series; Nominated - Primetime Emmy Award for Outstanding Guest Actor in a Drama Series
2016–2019	Gotham	Professor Hugo Strange	Recurring role
2016	Last Week Tonight with John Oliver	Scientist	Episode: "Scientific Studies"
2017–2019	Something's Killing Me with BD Wong	Host/Presenter	18 episodes
2017	DuckTales	Toad Liu Hai	Voice; Episode: "The House of the Lucky Gander!"
2018	American Horror Story: Apocalypse	Baldwin Pennypacker	3 episodes
2019–2020	The Flash	Godspeed	Voice
2020–2023	Awkwafina Is Nora from Queens	Wally	Recurring role
2023–2025	Gremlins	Hon Wing	Voice

=== Video games ===
Year	Title	Role	Notes
2005	Kingdom Hearts II	Captain Li Shang	English version
2007	Kingdom Hearts II: Final Mix+	Captain Li Shang	English version
2015	Lego Jurassic World	Henry Wu	
2018	Jurassic World Evolution	Henry Wu	
2021	Jurassic World Evolution 2	Henry Wu	
2023	Disney Speedstorm	Captain Li Shang	

=== Audio dramas ===
Year	Title	Role	Notes
2021–2022	Around the Sun	Dr. Lee	Voice; 2 episodes

=== Theater ===
Year	Title	Role	Notes
1988–1990	M. Butterfly	Song Liling	Broadway debut Clarence Derwent Award for Most Promising Male; Outer Critics Circle Award for Best Debut Performance; Drama Desk Award for Outstanding Featured Actor in a Play; Theatre World Award; Tony Award for Best Performance by a Featured Actor in a Play
1993	Face Value	Randall Lee	
1999	You're a Good Man, Charlie Brown	Linus	
2004–05	Pacific Overtures	Reciter	
2012	Herringbone	Various characters	One-man show
2019	The Great Leap	Wen Chang	

=== Theme parks ===
Year	Name	Role	Theme Park	Notes
2019	Jurassic World: The Ride	Dr. Henry Wu	Universal Studios Hollywood	
2021	VelociCoaster	Dr. Henry Wu	Universal's Islands of Adventure	
TBA	DuckTales World Showcase Adventure	Toad Liu Hai	EPCOT	Released December 16, 2022

=== Audiobooks ===
Year	Title	Author	Publisher
1991	Shadow of a Broken Man	George C. Chesbro	Random House Audio
1991	The Fear in Yesterday's Rings	George C. Chesbro	Random House Audio
1997	Ticktock	Dean Koontz	Random House Audio
2002	Balzac and the Little Chinese Seamstress	Dai Sijie	Random House Audio
2019	The Red Scrolls of Magic	Cassandra Clare, Wesley Chu	Simon & Schuster Audio
2020	The Lost Book of the White	Cassandra Clare, Wesley Chu	Simon & Schuster Audio
2022	To Paradise	Hanya Yanagihara	Random House Audio

== Awards and nominations ==
Year	Award	Category	Work	Result
1988	Tony Award	Best Featured Actor in a Play	M. Butterfly	Won
1988	Drama Desk Award	Outstanding Featured Actor in a Play	M. Butterfly	Won
1988	Outer Critics Circle Award	Outstanding Debut Performance	M. Butterfly	Won
1988	Theatre World Award		M. Butterfly	Won
1988	Clarence Derwent Award	Most Promising Male Performer	M. Butterfly	Won
2003	Outer Critics Circle Award	Outstanding Featured Actor in a Play	Shanghai Moon	Nominated
2003	GLAAD Media Award	Davidson/Valentini Award		Won
2013	Best Shorts Competition	Voice Over Talent	The No Name Painting Association	Won
2016	Critics' Choice Television Award	Best Guest Performer in a Drama Series	Mr. Robot	Nominated
2017	Primetime Emmy Awards	Outstanding Guest Actor in a Drama Series	Mr. Robot	Nominated

== See also ==
- Chinese people in the New York City metropolitan area
- LGBT culture in New York City
- List of LGBT people from New York City
