= A. J. LoCascio =

American actor, director and producer

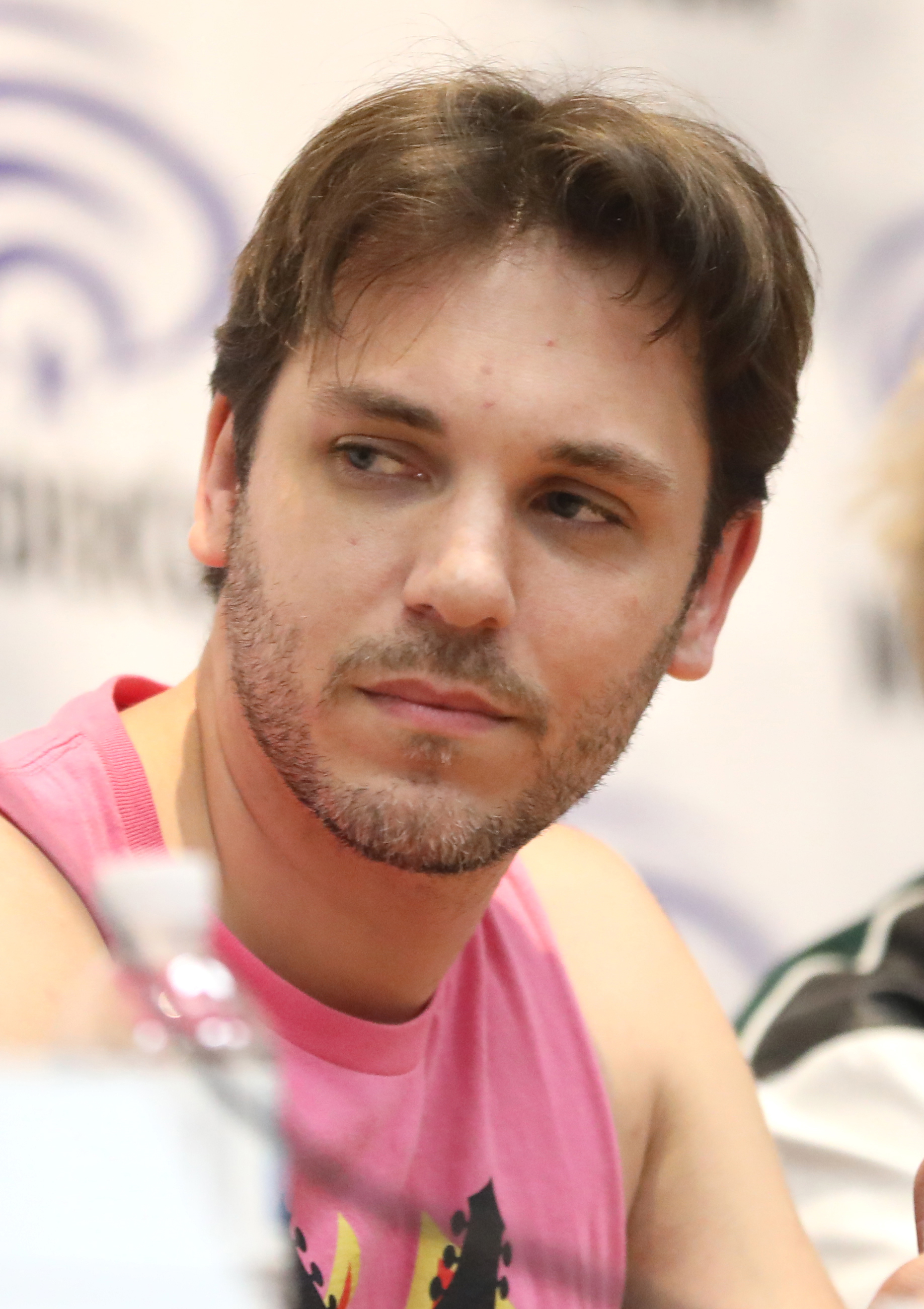
- LoCascio at the 2024 WonderCon
- Education: School of Visual Arts
- Occupations: Actor; director
- Years active: 2007–present
- Agent: CESD
- Website: www.ajlocascio.com

A. J. LoCascio is an American actor and director. He is known for his roles as Prince Lotor in Voltron: Legendary Defender, Marty McFly in Back to the Future: The Game and Gambit in X-Men '97.

== Early life ==
LoCascio grew up in New Jersey before moving to New York City where he attended the School of Visual Arts. He is the older brother of Jamison LoCascio, a film director and founder of the production company, FilmValor.

== Career ==
In an interview for the release of Back to the Future: The Game, LoCascio said that as a child, people used to say that he sounded like Marty McFly from Back to the Future; LoCascio auditioned for the part and got it since Michael J. Fox was unavailable to voice the character (but voiced Willie McFly and Future Marty in the episode "Outatime").

He has performed as a voice actor on other projects, along with directing, producing and working in the costume and wardrobe department. He was the co-host of the pilot of a nostalgia-heavy talk show called Yesterday Tonight.

LoCascio also starred in a Minecraft web series called Seedlings as the main character, Mark.

He voiced Emmet Brickowski in the Legoland 4D short subject The Lego Movie: 4D – A New Adventure. This was because Chris Pratt was unavailable at that time.

LoCascio voiced Prince Lotor (son of Emperor Zarkon) and James Griffin on Voltron: Legendary Defender.

In 2024, he voiced Gambit in X-Men '97, a revival of the original animated series, replacing original series voice actor Chris Potter. The following year, he reprised the role for the video games Marvel Mystic Mayhem and Marvel Rivals.

== Filmography ==
=== Film ===
Year	Title	Role	Notes
2007	Henchman	Spencer Homicide	Short film
2007	Skylights	Buddy	Short film Also co-producer
2008	Too Tall	Henry	Short film Also director
2009	Trying to Do Nothing	Peter	Short film
2009	Spaghetti and Meatballs	Buddy	Short film Also director
2009	Damn Your Eyes	Virgin	Short film
2014	Vitaminamulch: Air Spetacular	Cheese Plane, additional voices	Short film
2014	The Resolution	Corey	Short film
2014	Tinker Bell and the Legend of the NeverBeast	Additional voices	Direct-to-video
2015	Strong-Armed	Robot Designer	Short film
2016	Teenage Mutant Ninja Turtles in Pizza Friday	Donatello (voice)	Short film
2016	Lego Jurassic World: The Indominus Escape	Owen Grady (voice)	Short film
2018	Incredibles 2	Additional voices	
2020	The Lego Star Wars Holiday Special	Han Solo, Jawa (voices)	
2021	The Witcher: Nightmare of the Wolf	Sven (Young)	

=== Television ===
Year	Title	Role	Notes	Source
2012	Beyond the Marquee		Episode: "The Art of Time-Travel"	
2012–2015	Hey Ash, Whatcha Playin'?	Various	8 episodes	
2012–2015	Brickleberry	Additional voices	Various episodes	
2013	Seedlings	Mark	12 episodes	
2014	Baked Goods	Ad Announcer	Episode: "Game of Drones"	
2015	RocketJump: The Show	Jon Snow, The Doctor	Episode: "Fan Friction"	
2015–2017	Dawn of the Croods	Thunk Crood, Baitsy, Steve, additional voices	Main role	
2017–2018	Voltron: Legendary Defender	Prince Lotor, James Griffin (voices)	Main role	
2017	Star Wars Forces of Destiny	Han Solo (voice)	Episode: "An Imperial Feast"	
2018	Lego Star Wars: All Stars	Stormtrooper (voice)	Episode: "Escape with Chewbecca"	
2019	Critters: A New Binge	Additional voices	4 episodes	
2019	Box Peek	Yellow Fang	Episode: "A Gust of Win!"	
2020	The Loud House	Sully, Male Teenage Conductor, Store Manager (voices)	Recurring role	
2020	Harvey Girls Forever!	Ram-Ram, 1990s Announcer (voices)	2 episodes	
2021–2023	The Croods: Family Tree	Thunk Crood (voice)	Main role	
2021	Lego Star Wars: Terrifying Tales	Han Solo, Imperial Pilot (voices)		
2021–2022	Ranking of Kings	Domas (voice)	English dub	
2023	Gremlins	Gizmo, additional voices	10 episodes	
2022	Scar on the Praeter	Eiji (voice)	English dub	
2024-present	X-Men '97	Remy LeBeau / Gambit / Death, additional voices	Main role; 7 episodes	
2025	City the Animation	Tekaridake Nobuteru (voice)	English dub	
2025	Star Wars: Tales of the Underworld	Colby, Shopkeeper		
2026	How Not To Draw	Figment (voice)		
2026	Star Wars: Maul – Shadow Lord	Marrok		

=== Video games ===
Year	Title	Role	Note
2010	Back to the Future: Blitz Through Time	Marty McFly	
2010–2011	Back to the Future: The Game	Marty McFly	
2011	Naked Gun: I.C.U.P.	Frank Drebin Jr., Estaban Miranda	
2012	Thirty Flights of Loving	Jeff Goldblum	
2013	The Croods: Prehistoric Party!	Thunk Crood	
2014	Schrödinger's Cat and the Raiders of the Lost Quark	Various	
2015	Evolve	Mark, The Jackal	
2015	Back to the Future: The Game 30th Anniversary Edition	Marty McFly, Leech	
2016	Star Ocean: Integrity and Faithlessness	Ted	
2017	Final Fantasy XV	Additional voices	English version
2018	Jurassic World Evolution	Owen Grady	
2019	The Lego Movie 2 Videogame	Emmet Brickowski	
2019	Days Gone	Additional voices	
2020	Doom Eternal	Sentinel Guard, ARC Scientist, Intern (The Ancient Gods - Part One)	
2020	Final Fantasy VII Remake	Additional voices	
2020	Mafia: Definitive Edition	Additional voices	
2020	Star Wars: Squadrons	Pilot	
2021	Jurassic World Evolution 2	Owen Grady	
2022	Horizon Forbidden West	Lao	
2022	Lego Star Wars: The Skywalker Saga	Han Solo	
2022	God of War Ragnarök	Skjöldr	
2023	Disney Speedstorm	Figment	
2024	Mighty Morphin Power Rangers: Rita's Rewind	Jason Lee Scott / Red Ranger, Zordon, Alpha 5	
2025	Foolish Mortals	Murphy McCallan	
2025	Marvel Rivals	Remy LeBeau / Gambit	
2026	God of War Sons of Sparta	The Krypteia Petros	

=== Theme parks ===
Year	Title	Role	Note
2016	The Lego Movie: 4D – A New Adventure	Emmet Brickowski	
2024	Country Bear Musical Jamboree	Henry	
