= People Who Knew Me =

2023 audio drama by the BBC

People Who Knew Me is an audio drama by the BBC and Merman Productions starring Rosamund Pike.

== Background ==
The podcast was produced by BBC Radio 5 Live in collaboration with Merman Productions. Sharon Horgan is the executive producer of the show. The show is a 10 episode adaptation of a novel of the same name written by Kim Hooper. The show was written and directed by Daniella Isaacs.

The show was released on BBC Sounds in May 2023 and was broadcast on BBC Radio 4 the following month. The show stars Rosamund Pike as the protagonist. Pike previously starred in the audio drama Edith!.

The cast also includes Hugh Laurie, Isabella Sermon, Kyle Soller, Alfred Enoch, Daniella Isaac, and Jessica Darrow. The show was recorded in various locations using microphones attached to the voice actors' heads.

The protagonist's name was Emily Morris. However, she was late for work during the 9/11 attacks and decided to fake her death and leave to start a new life with the name Connie Prynne. After leaving her old life behind, Connie moves to California where she raises her daughter Claire as a single mother. Years later, Connie is diagnosed with cancer and needs to provide her daughter with support before she dies. Prynne acts as an unreliable narrator for the story.
