= Maisie Lockwood =

Jurassic Park character

- Jurassic Park character
- Isabella Sermon as Maisie Lockwood in Jurassic World Dominion (2022).
- First appearance: Jurassic World: Fallen Kingdom (2018)
- Last appearance: Jurassic World: Maisie Lockwood Adventures (2022)
- Created by: Colin Trevorrow; J. A. Bayona
- Portrayed by: Isabella Sermon

In-universe information
- Species: Human (clone)
- Family: Benjamin Lockwood (maternal grandfather/genetic father; deceased); Charlotte Lockwood (mother/genetic creator/donor; deceased); Owen Grady (adoptive father); Claire Dearing (adoptive mother); Karen Mitchell (adoptive maternal aunt); Scott Mitchell (adoptive maternal uncle); Zach Mitchell (adoptive maternal cousin); Gray Mitchell (adoptive maternal cousin)

Maisie Lockwood is a fictional character in the Jurassic Park franchise. She is introduced in the fifth film, Jurassic World: Fallen Kingdom (2018), which is also the second installment in the Jurassic World trilogy. J. A. Bayona directed the film, casting Isabella Sermon (in her feature debut) as Maisie. She is one of the three main protagonists in the Jurassic World trilogy, along with her adoptive parents, Owen Grady (portrayed by Chris Pratt) and Claire Dearing (portrayed by Bryce Dallas Howard). She used to live with her late grandfather Sir Benjamin Lockwood, an old business partner of Dr. John Hammond. She is the biogenetic daughter of geneticist Charlotte Lockwood.

In Fallen Kingdom, she is portrayed initially as the granddaughter of Benjamin Lockwood, though it is revealed later in the film that he actually cloned her from his deceased daughter. Co-writer Colin Trevorrow introduced human cloning to the film series to explore the full effects of genetic power. The film marked Sermon's film debut, and she reprised the role in the sequel, Jurassic World Dominion (2022). In the film, she forms a close bond with Beta, the asexual offspring of Owen's Velociraptor Blue. Later, she and Beta are kidnapped by Biosyn for research purposes, prompting Owen and Claire to embark on a rescue mission. While at Biosyn, Maisie learns she is not only cloned from Charlotte but that the latter also gave birth to her asexually, making them daughter and mother. Trevorrow, who co-wrote and directed Dominion, said that Maisie's role as Charlotte's daughter had always been planned.

Maisie is the subject of Jurassic World: Maisie Lockwood Adventures, a two-part 2022 book series by author Tess Sharpe. The books take place between the two films and explore Maisie's life in a world now widely populated by dinosaurs.

Maisie has received a mixed to positive reception from film critics. While her clone backstory, evolving origin, and overall character received mixed reactions, Sermon's performance has been well-received, and some consider Maisie to be one of the best Jurassic Park characters.

== Fictional background ==
=== Jurassic World: Fallen Kingdom (2018) ===
Sermon as Maisie Lockwood, in the film Jurassic World: Fallen Kingdom (2018)

The around nine-year-old Maisie Lockwood is initially portrayed as the granddaughter of Sir Benjamin Lockwood, adopted by him after her mother Charlotte died in a car accident. Maisie lives at Lockwood Estate and is cared for by family housekeeper Iris. She has a passion for dinosaurs and likes to imitate them as a play activity. Maisie expresses curiosity about her mother, though Benjamin does not allow her to see photographs of her.

Later, Maisie is fascinated by a video of Owen Grady training his Velociraptors, including Blue. She then discovers Eli Mills's plan to auction Isla Nublar's dinosaurs and is distraught when she discovers her grandfather's dead body, after Mills suffocated him. She grabs his photo album and discovers that his daughter was identical to her in appearance during childhood. With Benjamin dead, Mills becomes Maisie's guardian and dismisses Iris.

When Owen and Claire arrive, Maisie recognizes Owen from the video and Claire from a meeting she had with Benjamin. Owen and Claire form a bond with Maisie and comfort her following her grandfather's death, during which Maisie sees Owen as a surrogate father based on actions. As her guardian, Mills confronts Owen and Claire, and demands that Maisie stay with him when he suspects that they want to take care of her. He informs them that Maisie is actually a clone of Benjamin's deceased daughter. She is then pursued throughout Benjamin's mansion by the Indoraptor after it escapes. Owen and Claire work to protect Maisie from the Indoraptor and manage to kill it with assistance from Blue. When the unsold captive dinosaurs are threatened by a hydrogen cyanide leak, Maisie releases them into the wild. Being a clone, she sympathizes with the dinosaurs and believes they should be free. Owen and Claire go on to adopt Maisie, who is accepted as a real person despite knowing of her origins.

=== Jurassic World Dominion (2022) ===
Four years has passed since the incident at the estate, and rumors have circulated about Maisie's existence as a clone. In the Sierra Nevada, Maisie has lived in seclusion with Owen and Claire, who worry that she will be kidnapped for research purposes if she leaves home. Maisie, now 14 years old, has become rebellious over living in isolation and takes secret bicycle trips to town to explore society without her parents' knowledge, often concealing her face with her hoodie and not staying in one place too long to avoid discovery. She is also having an existential crisis over being a clone and is curious to learn more about Charlotte. When Blue shows up at the family's cabin with a hatchling, Maisie names it Beta and forms a bond with it. Later, they are both captured by mercenaries hired by Biosyn Genetics' CEO Dr. Lewis Dodgson and brought to the company's headquarters in Italy.

At Biosyn, Maisie meets Dr. Henry Wu, who shows her videos of Charlotte. She once lived with the scientists on Isla Sorna, and later became a geneticist and colleague of Wu's. He explains that the story of Charlotte dying in a car accident and Benjamin cloning her was just a cover-up formulated by Benjamin. In addition to being Charlotte's clone, Wu reveals to Maisie that she was also birthed by Charlotte, making them daughter and mother; Maisie was born asexually after Charlotte manipulated her ovum, wanting a child of her own without the need of a partner. It is revealed that Charlotte actually died of a genetic disorder while Maisie was young, but she was able to prevent the illness in the latter by altering her genome. Wu has been trying, unsuccessfully, to replicate Charlotte's research, because of having little of the files of her research while the rest is lost to time after her death. He wants to study Maisie's altered DNA and compare it with Beta's unaltered DNA to process tracing Charlotte's work, hoping to find a solution to Biosyn's giant locusts from it, which threaten the world food supply.

Maisie escapes containment and meets Dr. Alan Grant and Dr. Ellie Sattler, who are at Biosyn investigating the locust incidents. Ellie reveals that she knew Charlotte; they met when Charlotte came to Ellie's university as a guest lecturer, during which Ellie had met Maisie years before as a baby. Charlotte is said to have cared deeply for Maisie. After reuniting with her parents, Maisie helps Owen and Alan to retrieve Beta from within the Biosyn facility. Maisie also convinces the others to take Dr. Wu along, as she agrees to let him study her and Beta in order to resolve the locust crisis. Having found closure in the truth of her past, Maisie happily returns to life with Owen and Claire, and Beta is returned to Blue.

== Production background ==
Fallen Kingdom and Dominion were co-written by Colin Trevorrow, who also directed the latter. He included the concept of human cloning in an effort to explore the full effects that genetic power could have in the Jurassic Park film universe. He said that "we're so much closer to cloning humans than we are to cloning dinosaurs. It felt like far less of a leap to me than dinosaurs do. [...] To have a character who has such deep love and has felt such loss and the inability to go on, I think is something we all feel. So the idea that you might be able to bring someone back in that way is emotionally grounded in a very universal idea".

Executive producer Steven Spielberg supported the human cloning concept and was excited about the questions it could raise in the film's sequel, while Trevorrow was nervous about whether audiences would accept such an idea. According to Fallen Kingdom director J. A. Bayona, the human cloning aspect was inspired by late author Michael Crichton, who wrote the novel Jurassic Park (1990) and its sequel The Lost World (1995). Bayona said that "telling the story of Maisie was like a way of trying to find out what Michael Crichton would think about the moment we live in right now". Regarding the mansion sequence in which Maisie is chased by the Indoraptor, Bayona compared the scenes to "the classic ending of a fairy tale, of a Gothic story, like finishing at the top of the castle with the princess in the tower and the dragon chasing the little girl". Approximately 2,500 girls were interviewed for the role of Maisie, which ultimately went to Isabella Sermon, marking her film debut.

Maisie's role as Charlotte's daughter had always been planned by Trevorrow, who said it was "very important to understand that Maisie wasn't made by some man who missed her". Trevorrow said that he and Dominion co-writer Emily Carmichael "really saw an opportunity to make this hopefully more emotionally satisfying than it could have been". Sermon was happy with Maisie's characterization in Dominion: "Not only is she this clone, but she's also a teenager. She's trying to figure out her place in the world. She's trying to grow up [...]. She's not just a science experiment. She's a human". To portray Charlotte, Trevorrow wanted to digitally age Sermon's face and then add it onto a body double. During the casting search for doubles, Trevorrow came across actress Elva Trill, who shared similar facial features with Sermon. After reciting lines, Trevorrow was impressed with Trill's performance and decided to cast her as Charlotte, scrapping the digital aging idea.

== Reception ==
Graeme McMillan, writing for The Hollywood Reporter, found that the introduction of Benjamin and Maisie Lockwood "immediately makes the rest of the Jurassic franchise seem dull by comparison. Sure, there are dinosaurs running around, but there's also this other scientist who's apparently been cloning actual human beings for years". He noted that dinosaurs are the focal point of the films and argued that by taking "the cloning focus away from the dinosaurs — even just for one character, as part of a shock reveal — it changes what the entire series is about".

Ben Kuchera of Polygon speculated that Maisie had dinosaur DNA and was disappointed with the eventual plot twist that she is a human clone, finding it underdeveloped. Referring to the dinosaur theory and clone reveal, Kuchera wrote that the film "spends a lot of its running time setting up what would have been one of the most ridiculous plot twists possible, and then backs away from it at the last moment to instead deliver something that seems to even bore the characters in the movie".

Liz Young of MovieWeb noted parallels between Maisie and the series' dinosaurs, writing that Fallen Kingdom "seems to use Maisie's presence as a clone as a metaphor for dinosaurs and their impact on the world and society". Matt Goldberg of Collider found the film, including its clone twist, too predictable: "What's meant to be a major reveal loses all its impact because the film is so ridiculously dumb and yet it assumes the audience isn't in on what happening". He also criticized Maisie's release of the dinosaurs, writing "there’s a big red button that leads to the outdoors, which is the only precaution in place. Maisie pushes the button and says, 'They're just like me,' so I guess Maisie eats people and destroys ecosystems".

Referring to her role in Dominion, Nick Bartlett of /Film wrote: "As the person who released the dinosaurs into the world, you would think she would have an interesting arc in this film, potentially grappling with her conscience over the consequences of her actions or coming to terms with her new identity. Unfortunately, this is barely touched upon, and her storyline is ultimately frustrating". He called Sermon's performance "particularly strong in scenes without dialogue" but found that she is "let down by cliched characterization", writing, "Rather than having any personality, she's just depicted as a stereotypical sullen teenager, and she has zero chemistry with her surrogate parents". Bartlett said that the "meandering plot thread regarding the truth of her biological origins, while fine on its own, kills the momentum and essentially serves as a distraction from the dinosaurs".

Michael John Petty of Collider praised Sermon's performance and wrote that Maisie's inclusion "into the greater Jurassic mythology is something to be celebrated and explored, as there are so many potential scientific, societal, and social implications of such a person's existence". However, he was disappointed by the character's newly explained origin in Dominion: "Instead of learning who Maisie is deep down, we again only learn what she is". Thomas Bacon of Screen Rant was also critical of her new origin story. Saim Cheeda, also of Screen Rant, ranked Maisie's character arc as the second-best in the film series, writing that she "developed from being a scared child to set herself on the path of continuing her biological mother's legacy, ultimately providing Wu with the means to reverse the effects of the locusts".

== See also ==
- List of Jurassic Park characters
