= Ticktock (novel) =

1996 novel by Dean Koontz

- First edition (UK)
- Author: Dean Koontz
- Cover artist: Lee Gibbons
- Language: English
- Genre: Thriller, Suspense novel
- Publisher: Ballantine Books (US); Headline (UK)
- Publication date: Jul 1996
- Publication place: United States
- Media type: Print
- Pages: 311
- ISBN: 0-7472-1398-4
- OCLC: 45177260

Ticktock (1996) is a novel by Dean Koontz. It is significantly out-of-genre for Koontz: after a typical horror opening, the tone of the plot changes to screwball comedy and the humour increases steadily to the end. The subplot of protagonist Tommy Phan's struggle to reconcile his family's tenacious hold on their Vietnamese roots with his personal desire to be purely American is essential to the plot development.

== Plot summary ==
Tommy Phan is a first-generation Vietnamese American in southern California, a successful detective novelist whose greatest ambition is to live the American Dream. The story opens with Tommy getting a new Corvette. He argues with his mother, refusing her invitation to dinner. In a fit of rebellion, he eats two cheeseburgers, something his mother dislikes. He meets a blond waitress. His car radio quits working during and in the static are eerie voices.

Once home, Tommy finds a rag doll on his front steps, along with a note, written in Vietnamese, which he knew when he was a child but has forgotten in his quest to be a true American. After taking the doll into his study, it soon bursts open to reveal an evil creature who seems intent on killing Tommy. A message is left on his computer screen saying he has until dawn, but what will happen at dawn, Tommy does not know. After Tommy serendipitously has another meeting with Del the waitress, they embark on a race to flee the creature. Del speaks critically and tells inconsistent stories about her ever-convenient abilities and lucky circumstances. (At one point she stole a car, saying one minute she hotwired it, and the next that the key was in the ignition.)

The doll appears to be growing larger as their journey continues. They visit Tommy's brother, Gi, to try and translate the note. They then go to Del's apartment, where it's revealed that she's quite rich despite working as a waitress. When Tommy says that he wants to see Del's paintings that she mentioned, she threatens to shoot him if he does. Her dog seems incredibly smart, which unnerves Tommy.

In their journey to escape the ever-growing doll, Tommy's Corvette is trashed, two cars are stolen, and one large boat is trashed. They arrive at Del's mother's home, which appears utterly odd. Del's mother shows an uncanny sense when she knows exactly when the rain will stop.

Gi calls and tells Tommy to go to their mother, and not to bring the blonde along. Tommy brings Del along anyway, where they learn the doll was conjured to scare him back home by a friend of his mother. They begin a ritual that, after a few harrowing minutes, completely dispels the monster.

Tommy sees Del's paintings and they're of him. She had remotely viewed him over the past 2 years because she knows he is her destiny.

Tommy and Del quickly get married in Las Vegas and Frank Sinatra sings at their wedding reception.

== Critical comment ==
Unlike most of Koontz's work, this is a screwball comedy/horror story, in which the comedy gradually outweighs the horror. Serious themes of pagan magic and family conflicts between the ancestral Vietnamese culture and the "American Dream" are counterpoised with the crazy comedy reminiscent of the classic comedy movies of the 1930s such as "Bringing Up Baby".

Critical comment is generally positive. Koontz has stated in the Afterword that he wrote the novel partly as a relief from the darker aspects of his work, especially "Dark Rivers of the Heart", and partly for the challenge of writing a good screwball comedy.
