= Lego Jurassic World =

2015 video game

- Developer: TT Fusion
- Publishers: Warner Bros. Interactive Entertainment; Feral Interactive; (OS X)
- Director: Jamie Eden
- Writers: Dan Donnan; Jonathan Jacevicius (credited as Jonny Jacevicius); Ross MacKenzie; Will Miles
- Composers: Rob Westwood; Ian Livingstone; Original music composed by Michael Giacchino and John Williams
- Series: Lego; Jurassic Park
- Platforms: Nintendo Switch; Nintendo 3DS; PlayStation 3; PlayStation 4; PlayStation Vita; Wii U; Windows; Xbox 360; Xbox One; OS X; Android; iOS
- Release: 12 June 2015; OS X; 23 July 2015; Android, iOS; 31 March 2016; Nintendo Switch; NA: 17 September 2019; EU: 20 September 2019
- Genre: Action-adventure
- Modes: Single-player, multiplayer

Lego Jurassic World is a Lego-themed action-adventure game developed by TT Fusion and published by Warner Bros. Interactive Entertainment. It adapts the plots of the first four films in the Jurassic Park franchise, and is part of a series of Lego-themed video games. The game was released for Nintendo 3DS, PlayStation 3, PlayStation 4, PlayStation Vita, Wii U, Windows, Xbox 360, and Xbox One on 12 June 2015 to coincide with the theatrical release of Jurassic World. An OS X port by Feral Interactive followed shortly thereafter, on 23 July. Lego Jurassic World was later released for Android and iOS on 31 March 2016. A Nintendo Switch version was released on 17 September 2019.

== Gameplay ==
Lego Jurassic World's gameplay is similar to previous Lego video games. Gameplay consists of the player solving puzzles. The game features 20 levels, with five levels based on each film. The levels are accessed through a free-roaming overworld area. The game incorporates a two-player cooperation mode. The game features more than 100 unlockable characters to play as, including more than 20 dinosaur species, such as Velociraptor, Brachiosaurus, Spinosaurus, Ankylosaurus, Parasaurolophus, Stegosaurus, Triceratops and Tyrannosaurus. Mr. DNA, a cartoon character featured in the 1993 Jurassic Park film, is also an unlockable character. Throughout the game, Mr. DNA provides the player with hints and with dinosaur trivia, as he did in the Jurassic Park video game for the Super NES.

Human characters include Dr. Alan Grant, Ian Malcolm, and Owen Grady. Each character has a special ability. The utilization of each character's ability is required to progress through the game. Jurassic World producers Pat Crowley and Frank Marshall appear as unlockable characters, as well as the film's director, Colin Trevorrow. Steven Spielberg, who has acted as director and executive producer for films in the series, is also an unlockable character.

The player can also create new human characters by travelling to either the Jurassic Park Visitor Center or the Jurassic World Innovation Center. Hybrid dinosaurs can also be created from various parts of dinosaurs that can be unlocked during the game's progression. Enemies include Compsognathus, Dilophosaurus, Troodon, and the Indominus rex.

The 3DS version excludes the free-roaming mode for a central hub instead, but is otherwise nearly identical to the home console versions of the game. The Android and iOS versions also use a main hub section to access levels; because of limitations on digital storage space, these versions feature fewer levels and fewer cutscenes than the home console versions, and the levels are also reduced in size. The iOS version supports use of iCloud and Game Center.

== Plot ==
The game follows the storylines from the Jurassic Park films: Jurassic Park, The Lost World: Jurassic Park, Jurassic Park III and Jurassic World. However, the developers modified the storylines to fit the events into five levels per film. Notable scenes from each film have been recreated in the game, although as the game was intended for a younger audience, the scenes are depicted in a more humorous manner. All death scenes from the films were removed, with characters depicted as simply being injured, escaping from harm, or miraculously surviving.

== Development ==
Lego Jurassic World was developed by TT Fusion. Voice clips were taken directly from characters in the series' first three films and were implemented into the game.

Original music for the game was written by Rob Westwood, and was composed by Chad Seiter. "Journey to the Island", "T-Rex Rescue and Finale" and "Malcolm's Journey", three tracks written by composer John Williams for Jurassic Park and The Lost World: Jurassic Park, were also implemented into the game, along with music composed by Michael Giacchino for Jurassic World.

The game was first teased when Plastic Man's Tyrannosaurus form appeared during the end credits of the 2014 video game, Lego Batman 3: Beyond Gotham. The game was officially announced in January 2015. In March 2015, a trailer was released for the game. A second trailer was released on 14 May 2015, giving a release date of 12 June 2015, to coincide with the theatrical release of Jurassic World.

=== Audio ===
Many actors from Jurassic World provided new vocal footage for the game, including Chris Pratt, Bryce Dallas Howard, Nick Robinson, Ty Simpkins, Vincent D'Onofrio, Irrfan Khan, Omar Sy, BD Wong, Jake Johnson, and Lauren Lapkus. Comedian Jimmy Fallon, who had a cameo in the film, also provided his voice for the game's Jurassic World chapter and is also a playable character. Peter Stormare reprised his role as Dieter Stark from The Lost World: Jurassic Park, making him the only actor from the second or third films to contribute new lines.

== Reception ==
Reception

Aggregate score
Aggregator	Score							
Aggregator	3DS	General	iOS	NS	PC	PS4	Wii U	Xbox One
Metacritic			80/100	71/100	72/100	70/100	71/100	70/100

Review scores
Publication	Score							
Publication	3DS	General	iOS	NS	PC	PS4	Wii U	Xbox One
Game Informer						6/10		
GameSpot						6/10		
GamesRadar+						3.5/5		
IGN					7.6/10			
Nintendo Life	4/10						6/10	
Nintendo World Report	8/10							
Official Xbox Magazine (UK)								5/10
Gamezebo			4/5					
New York Daily News		3/5						
NF Magazine							70/100	
Pocket Gamer			8/10					
San Jose Mercury News		1.5/4						
TouchArcade			3.5/5					

According to review aggregator website Metacritic, most versions of Lego Jurassic World received "mixed or average reviews", while the iOS version received "generally favorable reviews".

Ebenezer Samuel of the New York Daily News noted the "largely simple and friendly" gameplay and puzzles, and wrote, "By and large, there's plenty to love in LEGO Jurassic World, despite a smattering of little bugs. TT Games doesn't reinvent with LEGO Jurassic World at all. But it does build a solid gaming experience that parents and kids can appreciate together."

Gieson Cacho of San Jose Mercury News criticized the game's camera angles, difficulty, and also noted that the game was too similar to previous Lego video games. Cacho enjoyed the game's playable dinosaurs, but also wrote, "Unfortunately, there are only a handful of moments where players control them." Dave Rudden of IGN praised the PC version for its fast pacing and "fun puzzles". However, Rudden criticized the "frustrating" presence of Compsognathus in each chapter of the game and said "the overworld is a bit of a mess, especially when I had to explore the islands to find the entrance to a new level."

Matt Clapham of GamesRadar+, who reviewed the PlayStation 4 version, enjoyed the game's playable dinosaur characters, but criticized the "occasionally patchy" quality of dialogue that was incorporated into the game from the first three films, saying it "stands out next to the freshly voiced extras." Clapham also criticized the Compsognathus enemies; the artificial intelligence of the game's computer-controlled companion characters; and noted that the game is prone to crashing.

Joe Juba of Game Informer, who reviewed the PlayStation 4 version, enjoyed the game's colorful graphics and its use of theme songs from the films, but also felt that the gameplay was too similar to previous Lego video games. Juba criticized the "annoying" Compsognathus enemies, and considered battles with other enemies to be "boring." Juba also felt that the game's feature to play as dinosaurs took "too long to gain any steam." Juba also criticized the game for technical glitches, and felt that the limited amount of audio from the first three films was "distracting and poorly used." Juba concluded that, "Lego Jurassic World is a dull, occasionally frustrating experience with a lot of cute nods to the series for hardcore fans. That's as good as it gets."

Jeremy Signor of GameSpot reviewed the PlayStation 4 version, and wrote that it had "style and undeniable charm that will melt your cynical heart, but the boring things the game makes you do hamper the joy." Signor wrote, "The problem is that you can't actually experiment with anything in any real sense. The different abilities are simply keys to unlock progress or secrets. You never get the chance to noodle around with the mechanics or improvise since there's always just one solution to every obstacle the game puts in your way." Signor also criticized the audio from the original films, saying that it "wasn't mixed very well with the game audio, which sounds jarring next to the pristine, polished sounds and voices recorded for the game". Signor concluded that the game focused too much on "visual and thematic experience almost entirely while letting the actual gameplay languish. Jurassic Park in particular doesn't suit this design because flattening the mechanics removes all notions of tension from the game, an essential part of the film series."

Dave Letcavage of Nintendo Life, reviewing the Wii U version, wrote that the game "is exactly what we've come to expect of the LEGO series, with very few surprises. Thankfully, a herd of the missions are designed expertly, and they prove why such a prolific series has stayed relevant all these years. But there are also numerous missions that fall flat, relying too heavily on unneeded combat or working too many playable characters into the mix. The campaign is a bumpy ride to be sure, though it's nowhere near being classified a disaster." Letcavage wrote that in certain levels, the "poor quality" of the audio clips from the original films "and their contrast with the music and sound effects make them hugely jarring". Letcavage also noted that the Wii U version did not run smoothly in comparison to the Xbox One and PlayStation 4 versions. NF Magazine, which reviewed the Wii U version, wrote, "LEGO Jurassic World is as 'more of the same' as a game gets." Official Xbox Magazine (UK) wrote about the Xbox One version: "Plenty of expense spared, we think."

Ron DelVillano of Nintendo Life criticized the 3DS version for its poor audio, and noted that its gameplay was too similar to previous Lego video games. DelVillano wrote that utilizing the system's 3D feature "ruins the entire experience. Jagged lines make themselves present, the once smooth visuals deteriorate, and the frame rate drops just enough to make you feel like you're playing at a slower speed. It's a disappointingly ugly experience." DelVillano also wrote that, "Because each film is condensed into a certain number of stages, large portions of the plots are left out in order to make room for more action. What we're left with is a mash up of interactive scenes that are loosely strung together by cinematic sequences that don't fully explain what is going on around you." Kimberly Keller of Nintendo World Report praised the 3DS version: "As amazing as it is that there has never been a Lego and dinosaur match-up before now, this game makes up for lost time." However, she noted slow loading times between levels, the "annoying" Compsognathus enemies, and felt that the game was, "Not too unique compared to previous Lego titles."

Rob Rich of Gamezebo reviewed the mobile version and praised the large amount of unlockable content and the "cleverly implemented" skills of its characters. However, Rich criticized the mobile version for its hub feature, as well as its exclusion of certain cutscenes and levels from the home console versions; Rich also noted that most of the game's levels were smaller in comparison, and concluded, "LEGO Jurassic World on mobile is a bit disappointing, but that's because I'm so fond of the original release and can spot what's missing. Honestly, it's no wonder some content was cut when you consider how much less digital storage space the average mobile device has when compared to a console or PC. Still, as with the earlier releases it shows plenty of reverence for the movies, and is easily the best mobile LEGO game I've played to date."

Ray Willmott of Pocket Gamer wrote that the iOS version was "good-old fashioned entertainment at its finest," writing that "Traveller's Tales has done a remarkable job of making everything feel refreshing, yet authentic." Willmott wrote that the touch controls "occasionally aren't receptive to your gestures - particularly for jumping. But the experience is generally fluid throughout." Willmott noted the sound effects as being "a bit tinny", but praised the soundtrack and wrote that the graphics "occasionally sparkle and dazzle on the small screen." Willmott concluded that while the game was not flawless, it was "a pleasure to play."

Shaun Musgrave of TouchArcade reviewed the iOS version, and noted the game's new vocal clips as well as the clips of "questionable quality grabbed from the movies," stating that "the two styles of voice samples certainly don't mesh well at all." However, Musgrave praised the game's support of iCloud and Game Center, as well as its diverse iOS-specific control settings, stating, "While I may rag on these games for the way they pull their designs back from the console versions, it's nice to see iOS-specific features get proper attention." Musgrave concluded that the game would appeal most to fans of Lego video games and of the Jurassic Park series.

=== Sales ===
In the US, Lego Jurassic World became the best-selling game of July 2015, with the Xbox 360 version selling the most copies. In the UK, Lego Jurassic World became the top-selling game for the week ending 20 June 2015. Lego Jurassic World took the top-selling spot again for two consecutive weeks during August 2015. On 13 October 2015, Warner Bros. revealed that the game had sold 4 million copies.
