= Isabella Sermon =

English actress (born 2006)

- Born: 8 July 2006 (age 20); Kensington and Chelsea, London, England
- Occupation: Actress
- Years active: 2017–present

Isabella Sermon (born 8 July 2006) is an English actress. She began her career as a child actress in the films Jurassic World: Fallen Kingdom (2018) and Jurassic World Dominion (2022).

== Early life ==
Sermon was born in the Kensington and Chelsea area of London, on 8 July 2006. She was nine when she discovered acting through her school play production of James and the Giant Peach.

She attended school and was in the midst of sitting her GCSEs while promoting Jurassic World Dominion in June 2022. She took acting classes with DMA London.

== Career ==
Sermon made her feature film debut as Maisie Lockwood in the 2018 film Jurassic World: Fallen Kingdom. She learned that she had been cast on Christmas Day when her mother surprised her with a printed-out email confirming her place in the film. She reprised her role as Maisie in the next installment, Jurassic World Dominion, released in 2022.

In 2023, Sermon voiced a character in BBC Radio 4's drama podcast People Who Knew Me. She is set to make her television debut in the Netflix adaptation of Pride and Prejudice as Georgiana Darcy.

== Personal life ==
Sermon is active in photography, creates art, and reads in her spare time.

== Filmography ==
=== Film ===
Year	Title	Role	Notes	Ref.
2018	Jurassic World: Fallen Kingdom	Maisie Lockwood	Feature film debut	
2022	Jurassic World Dominion	Maisie Lockwood / young Charlotte Lockwood		

=== Television ===
Key
†	Denotes television productions that have not yet been released

Year	Title	Role	Notes	Ref.
2026	Pride and Prejudice †	Georgiana Darcy		

=== Podcast ===
Year	Title	Role	Notes	Ref.
2023	People Who Knew Me (BBC Radio 4)	Claire		
