= Jurassic World Evolution 2 =

2021 video game developed by Frontier Developments

- Developer: Frontier Developments
- Publisher: Frontier Developments
- Director: Rich Newbold
- Producer: Adam Woods
- Designer: James Stimpson
- Composer: Joanna Pena
- Series: Jurassic Park
- Platforms: PlayStation 4; PlayStation 5; Windows; Xbox One; Xbox Series X/S; Nintendo Switch 2
- Release: PS4, PS5, Windows, Xbox One, Series X/S; November 9, 2021; Nintendo Switch 2; July 30, 2026
- Genre: Construction and management simulation
- Mode: Single-player

Jurassic World Evolution 2 is a construction and management simulation video game developed and published by Frontier Developments. A sequel to Jurassic World Evolution (2018) and set between Jurassic World: Fallen Kingdom and Jurassic World Dominion, the game was released for PlayStation 4, PlayStation 5, Windows, Xbox One, and Xbox Series X and Series S on November 9, 2021. It received generally favorable reviews from critics, who deemed it an improvement over its predecessor. A sequel, Jurassic World Evolution 3, was released on October 21, 2025.

== Gameplay ==
The game allows players to construct lagoons to contain prehistoric marine reptiles. Animals in the game will gradually expand their territories and some may fight for alpha status.

Similar to the first game, Evolution 2 is a business simulation in which the player constructs a Jurassic World prehistoric theme park. The game features more than 75 prehistoric species, including various dinosaurs, pterosaurs and marine reptiles. Players need to build enclosures, aviaries and lagoons to contain these animals for visitors' viewing. These animals have different needs, such as the type of food they eat and the extent of forestation they require in their habitat, that must be met to keep them healthy and satisfied. The game features a dynamic territory system which sees animals combating against each other for resources if they live in the same habitat. Their territories are constantly shifting depending on the resources available in their habitat. When compared with its predecessors, the game features a more complex artificial intelligence for the prehistoric species, which will hunt in packs and interact with others more frequently and realistically. The terrain tool was completely reworked, with players needing to plant the appropriate trees and shrubs for the herbivores to eat.

Players need to build various facilities and recruit scientists for research and incubating the prehistoric species. The scientists recruited offer different gameplay benefits, but overworked and disgruntled workers will sabotage the park and intentionally let the animals escape. To incubate a prehistoric animal, the player must first extract their DNA from their fossils. Their DNA can be adjusted to give the animals unique traits, such as resilience towards a certain kind of disease. Players also need to recruit rangers and veterinarians in order to keep the animals happy and healthy. To entertain the guests, players can construct different rides such as the Gyrospheres, which can now pass through multiple enclosures and be attacked by prehistoric animals. Guests are categorized into different groups with different interests. For instance, nature lovers are more keen to see herbivores, while adventurists are more interested in seeing carnivores. Amenities such as toilets, gift shops and restaurants also need to be constructed and players can customize them with different modules and decorations in order to meet the needs of different guests.

Unlike the first game, which is set on the fictional archipelago of Las Cinco Muertas, Evolution 2 is set in the outside world, featuring various biomes such as forests and deserts, with each providing unique challenges for the player while they are designing their parks. The maps featured in the game are significantly larger than those in the first game. The game features various modes, including a campaign mode which is set between Jurassic World: Fallen Kingdom and Jurassic World Dominion, a "Chaos Theory" mode which revisits key narrative moments in the Park and World trilogies (such as constructing the Jurassic Park facility near San Diego, as seen in The Lost World: Jurassic Park) and the Challenge and Sandbox modes also return. Jeff Goldblum and Bryce Dallas Howard return to provide the voice for Ian Malcolm and Claire Dearing respectively.

== Development and release ==
Jurassic World Evolution 2 was developed and published by Frontier Developments. The game was announced by Goldblum in June 2021 during Summer Game Fest. The game's campaign mode is considered canon with the films, taking place between Jurassic World: Fallen Kingdom and Jurassic World Dominion. Frontier worked closely with Universal Pictures, ensuring that the game fits into the studio's future plans for the franchise. The company was given access to Universal's collection of sound effects and theme music from the films.

Jurassic World Evolution 2 was released on November 9, 2021, for PlayStation 4, PlayStation 5, Windows, Xbox One, and Xbox Series X and Series S. Players who pre-ordered the game received three vehicle skins inspired by The Lost World: Jurassic Park. At launch, the Deluxe Upgrade Pack was released and added five new species. A port for Nintendo Switch 2, with a subtitle Complete Edition, released on July 30, 2026.

=== Updates and downloadable content ===
Jurassic World Evolution 2 is supported post-launch with the release of paid downloadable content (DLC) and free updates. The first DLC, the Early Cretaceous Pack, was released on December 9, 2021, and added four new species from the era. The second DLC, the Camp Cretaceous Dinosaur Pack, was released on March 8, 2022, and added one new species, one hybrid species and new appearances based on the animated televisions series Jurassic World Camp Cretaceous.

The game's first expansion, the Dominion Biosyn Expansion, was released on June 14, 2022, and features a new campaign, four new species, and new appearances based on Jurassic World Dominion. The third DLC, the Late Cretaceous Pack, was released on September 15, 2022, and added four new species from that era.

The game's second expansion, the Dominion Malta Expansion, was released on December 8, 2022, and features a new campaign, four new species, and new appearances based on Jurassic World Dominion. The fourth DLC, the Feathered Species Pack, was released on March 30, 2023, and added three feathered species and one flying reptile. A free update that added decorations inspired by the first movie was released on June 8, 2023, in advance of its 30th anniversary.

The fifth DLC, the Prehistoric Marine Species Pack was released on August 10, 2023, and added four new marine species. The sixth DLC, the Cretaceous Predator Pack, was released on November 30, 2023, and added four new carnivorous species. The seventh DLC, the Secret Species Pack, was released on March 13, 2024, and added three hybrid species from the first game and a new hybrid featured in Camp Cretaceous. The eighth DLC, the Park Managers' Collection Pack, was released on May 16, 2024, and added four new species.

DLC and free content updates released for Jurassic World Evolution 2
Name	Release date	Description
Deluxe Upgrade Pack	November 9, 2021	The Deluxe Upgrade Pack adds the Geosternbergia, Attenborosaurus, Pachyrhinosaurus, Huayangosaurus, and Megalosaurus as hatchable species.
Early Cretaceous Pack	December 9, 2021	The Early Cretaceous Pack adds the Wuerhosaurus, Minmi paravertebra, Dsungaripterus, and Kronosaurus as hatchable species.
Camp Cretaceous Dinosaur Pack	March 8, 2022	The Camp Cretaceous Dinosaur Pack adds 2 new species from the eponymous show from DreamWorks Animation, Monolophosaurus, and the fictional hybrid Scorpios rex. The DLC also features an alternate model for Ouranosaurus and Kentrosaurus, as the show featured a design that significantly differed from the in-game's models. The pack also adds skins based on several individual dinosaurs from the series: a Tyrannosaurus skin based on Big Eatie, a Kentrosaurus skin based on Pierce, a Carnotaurus skin based on Toro, an Ankylosaurus skin based on Bumpy, and Baryonyx skins based on Grim, Limbo, and Chaos. The pack also features 2 skins for the Parasaurolophus based on the fictional Parasaurolophus lux, an artificially created, bioluminescent species of Parasaurolophus. All added dinosaurs and skins were featured in the first 4 seasons of Camp Cretaceous.
Dominion Biosyn Expansion	June 14, 2022	The Dominion Biosyn Expansion adds a new campaign based at Biosyn Valley, featured in Jurassic World Dominion. In addition to Claire Dearing, the campaign features former Jurassic Park consultants Dr. Alan Grant (Sam Neill) and Dr. Ellie Sattler (Laura Dern), the head of Biosyn, Dr. Lewis Dodgson (Campbell Scott), and Ramsay Cole (Mamoudou Athie). The expansion also adds four new species: Pyroraptor, Therizinosaurus, Dimetrodon, and Quetzalcoatlus as hatchable species. Two new variants for two species, Giganotosaurus and Dreadnoughtus, and six new skins (two for Tyrannosaurus, one for Dilophosaurus, and three for Parasaurolophus), all based on their appearances in Dominion, were also added.
Late Cretaceous Pack	September 15, 2022	The Late Cretaceous Pack adds the Barbaridactylus, Styxosaurus, Australovenator, and Alamosaurus as hatchable species. The pack also introduced bioluminescent patterns, referred to as Lux, for the Styxosaurus.
Dominion Malta Expansion	December 8, 2022	The Dominion Malta Expansion adds a new campaign based on scenes featuring an underground market in Malta, also featured in Jurassic World Dominion and is set before the events of the film. The campaign features characters Kayla Watts (DeWanda Wise), Barry Sembène (Omar Sy), and Soyona Santos (Dichen Lachman). The expansion also adds new buildings, a new mechanic named the "Dinosaur Exchange", where players buy and trade dinosaur species in the black market as opposed to finding fossils and genomes in dig sites, three new islands based around the Mediterranean archipelago, and several new species: Atrociraptor, Lystrosaurus, Moros intrepidus, and Oviraptor. The expansion also features four additional variant skins for existing species, Allosaurus, Dimorphodon, Iguanodon, and Carnotaurus, based on their appearances in Dominion.
Feathered Species Pack	March 30, 2023	The Feathered Species Pack adds the Yutyrannus, Sinosauropteryx, Deinocheirus, and Jeholopterus as hatchable species.
Prehistoric Marine Species Pack	August 10, 2023	The Prehistoric Marine Species Pack adds the Archelon, Dunkleosteus, Nothosaurus, and Shonisaurus as hatchable species. The pack also introduces Lux patterns for the Nothosaurus, as well as a Lagoon Rock Platform to accommodate it and the Archelon.
Cretaceous Predator Pack	November 30, 2023	The Cretaceous Predator Pack adds the Gigantoraptor, Utahraptor, Concavenator, and Tarbosaurus as hatchable species.
Secret Species Pack	March 13, 2024	The Secret Species Pack reintroduces the fictional hybrids Ankylodocus, Spinoraptor, and Stegoceratops from Jurassic World Evolution, while also introducing the fictional hybrid Spinoceratops from Jurassic World Camp Cretaceous, as hatchable species. The pack also introduces Lux patterns for all four hybrids, as well as the Indominus rex and Indoraptor.
Park Managers' Collection Pack	May 16, 2024	The Park Managers' Collection Pack adds the Megalodon, Microceratus, Segisaurus, and Thanatosdrakon as hatchable species. It also adds a skin for the Tyrannosaurus, based on the individual Little Eatie from Jurassic World Camp Cretaceous.

== Reception ==
Reception

Aggregate score
Aggregator	Score
Metacritic	(PC) 77/100 (PS5) 79/100 (XBO) 81/100 (XSX) 74/100

Review scores
Publication	Score
Destructoid	8.5/10
Game Informer	8/10
Hardcore Gamer	4/5
PCGamesN	7/10
Push Square	8/10

The game received "generally favorable reviews", according to review aggregator platform Metacritic.

PCGames N awarded the game 7: "Improves on its predecessor in clever ways and still boasts the most gorgeous dinosaurs ever made in a game. But dealing with disastrous events beyond your control still isn't any fun, even if it's thematic for the Jurassic Park IP".

Early sales on the PC were lower than expected, as the game was released during the same week as several other high-profile PC games. The home console versions sold as expected, and the game had approximately 500,000 players across all platforms within two weeks of its release. Frontier expected the game to raise more revenue than its predecessor within its first year, in part because of the upcoming release of Jurassic World Dominion.

== Sequel ==
A sequel, Jurassic World Evolution 3, was announced by Frontier Developments in May 2024 and released on October 21, 2025.
