= Jurassic World Evolution =

2018 video game developed by Frontier Developments

- Developer: Frontier Developments
- Publisher: Frontier Developments
- Director: Michael Brookes
- Producers: Craig Abraham; Brendon Morgan; Craig Spiers
- Designers: Andrew Fletcher; Dan Greer
- Artist: John Laws
- Writer: John Zuur Platten
- Composer: Joanna Pena
- Series: Jurassic Park
- Engine: Cobra
- Platforms: PlayStation 4 Windows; Xbox One; Nintendo Switch
- Release: PS4, Windows, Xbox One; 12 June 2018; Nintendo Switch; 3 November 2020
- Genre: Construction and management simulation
- Mode: Single-player

Jurassic World Evolution is a construction and management simulation video game developed and published by Frontier Developments. Based on the 2015 film Jurassic World, the game was released in June 2018, for PlayStation 4, Windows, and Xbox One. A Nintendo Switch port of the game was released in November 2020. In the game, players construct a dinosaur park on Las Cinco Muertes Archipelago, a group of five islands also known as the "Five Deaths". The game features more than 40 types of dinosaurs; their genes can be modified to introduce new features. Players are given contracts to fulfill by three divisions, Science, Security and Entertainment, allowing them to progress. A sandbox mode set on Isla Nublar, the setting of the first and fourth films, can be unlocked. It can also be used from the main menu without having to be unlocked.

The game was created by a development team of approximately 100 people with a budget of around £8 million. Its development began in 2016, after NBCUniversal approached Frontier Developments about creating a game to accompany the theatrical release of Jurassic World: Fallen Kingdom. To do this, Frontier staff inspected different dinosaur models and reference materials sent by Universal, watched the Jurassic Park films, and read the novels and fan theories. The team consulted paleontologist Jack Horner when they designed the dinosaurs. Jeff Goldblum, Bryce Dallas Howard and BD Wong reprised their roles from the Jurassic Park film series, voicing remarks to players and contributing to the game's narrative.

Announced at Gamescom 2017, the game received a mixed critical reception. Critics praised its dinosaur designs and graphics, but the game's contracts, simulation and management gameplay were less well received. The game's tutorial and learning curve were also criticized. Seven months after its initial release, the game had sold two million copies through digital and physical sales, making it the most successful game launched by Frontier. The game was supported with free updates and downloadable content upon release. As of March 2020, the game had sold three million copies. The game was followed by two sequels, Jurassic World Evolution 2 (2021), and Jurassic World Evolution 3 (2025).

== Gameplay ==
A gameplay screenshot featuring the hybrid dinosaur Indominus rex from Jurassic World. To keep dinosaurs happy, players must fulfill different requirements as indicated by the status bars shown at the left.

Jurassic World Evolution is a business simulation game that allows the player to construct a Jurassic World dinosaur theme park with attractions and research facilities. Players must build an Expedition Center, which sends paleontologists to fossil dig sites to obtain dinosaurs' DNA material. DNA sequencing, which can be done in the Fossil Center unlocks new dinosaurs and updates their statistics, such as lifespan and resilience. With enough DNA content, players can use the Hammond Creation Lab to breed and incubate dinosaurs. Players can also improve the dinosaurs' genes by integrating DNA from modern species with that of the dinosaurs to fill their gaps and allow them to evolve. Modifications to the dinosaurs' DNA change their base statistics, as well as everything from their level of aggressiveness to their appearance. The game features a terrain tool which allows players to modify the environment by planting trees and creating water sources.

Dinosaurs are the game's main attraction and income earner, although money can also be earned through selling products in stores and guests staying at hotels. The game features approximately 40 dinosaur species at launch. Players can name each dinosaur after they are incubated. Players need to build enclosures to contain dinosaurs for visitors' viewing. The needs of different dinosaurs, like the type of food they eat and the extent of the social interactions they require, must be met to keep them healthy and satisfied. Dinosaurs, controlled by artificial intelligence, will interact with each other and the environment, as well as guests if they have broken out of their enclosure. For instance, carnivores will attack carnivores of a different species, and they will hunt down herbivores. Players also need to construct various entertainment rides, as well as amenities like restaurants and shops to please the guests. An example of tourist attractions is the Gyrosphere or the monorail from Jurassic World. Players can also use the game's photo mode to take pictures of dinosaurs, which help the park to earn money and publicity. Each entertainment facility and amenity comes with its own management system. Players are able to set and adjust entry fees as well as the number of staff present in each facility. Dinosaurs can be sold to earn additional income.

Various emergency situations may happen in the park, including power failures, unpredictable weather, and dinosaur breakouts, which must be addressed by players to ensure guests' safety and happiness. Players can build an ACU Center and a Ranger Station, which are responsible for maintaining the park's security. They can sedate escaped dinosaurs, medicate sick dinosaurs, resupply dinosaur feeders, transport dinosaurs, fix fences, and more. Players can also control vehicles from a third-person perspective such as helicopters and 4x4 trucks to complete these tasks. Emergency shelters to protect the guests, as well as other security structures like power network redundancies and storm warning centers, can be built. Many of these security facilities can be upgraded to strengthen their efficiency when dealing with emergencies.

=== Gameplay modes ===
In the career mode, the player's goal is to develop five-star parks across the fictional islands of the Las Cinco Muertes Archipelago. Various characters from the Jurassic World franchise assist players throughout the game. Players will meet other key figures representing the three branches of the park's development: Entertainment, Security, and Science. Each of these characters tries to convince players to develop the park in accordance with their advice. They give players "contracts" to complete which include a series of goals and objectives. These contracts add narrative to the game, as well as provide rewards and reputation in their respective domains. Players are advised to keep a close eye on their reputation within each division. If a player's reputation within a division gets too low, that creates a sabotage in the player's park that will need to be attended to immediately. For instance, the park's power could be shut down allowing dinosaurs to break out, or a disease could be introduced to infect them. These divisions all feed into the parks' ratings. The five islands, each with different characteristics and challenges, will gradually unlock with sufficient positive park ratings.

Isla Nublar — the island featured in Jurassic Park, Jurassic World, and Jurassic World: Fallen Kingdom — is the setting for a sandbox mode that is separate from the game's career mode. The sandbox mode is unlocked once a four-star park rating is achieved on Isla Matanceros, the starting island. Once this is accomplished, everything players have unlocked in career mode, such as building upgrades and dinosaurs, will transfer over to the sandbox; anything locked in career mode remains locked in the sandbox. In sandbox mode, players have unlimited funds, and they can set the weather and time of day at their parks. Challenge Mode, available in an update after the game's release, involves playing with adjustable levels of difficulty and limited money, in addition to other differences like fees and penalties against players.

There is a mode available from the main menu, which allows every island to be played in sandbox mode.

== Development and release ==
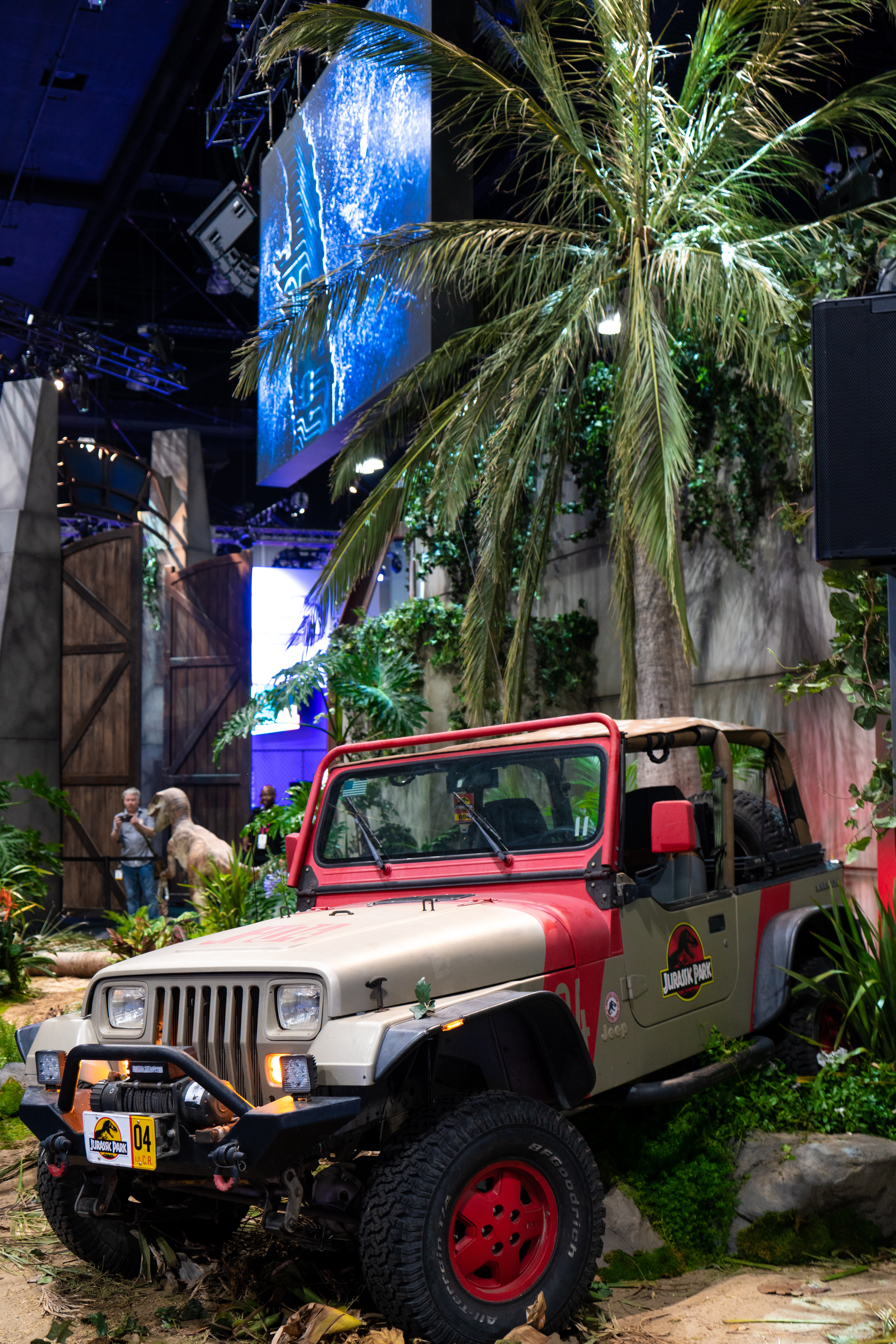
Jurassic World Evolution stand at E3 2018

Jurassic World Evolution was developed and published by Frontier Developments, and is based on the 2015 film Jurassic World, although the game is not considered canon, which allowed for more creative freedom. NBCUniversal had wanted a game to accompany the theatrical release of its 2018 film Jurassic World: Fallen Kingdom and approached Frontier Developments about creating it two years or so before the film's eventual release date. Frontier Developments was also interested in creating a dinosaur game.

The game was created with a development team of approximately 100 people, on a budget of around £8 million. It was built using Frontier Developments' Cobra game engine. Universal Pictures provided the developers with dinosaur models from the films to allow for a high level of detail, as well as reference materials and audio. To aid in creating the game, the development team closely watched the films and read Michael Crichton's novels, Jurassic Park and The Lost World, and fan theories. In addition, Universal and the team had discussions about various elements in the game. History from each of the films was added to the game. For example, Jeff Goldblum reprised his role as Ian Malcolm from the first two Jurassic Park films. Bryce Dallas Howard and BD Wong also reprised their roles from Jurassic World.

Tyrannosaurus was one of the first dinosaurs the development team began working on. For the T. rex roars, the game's sound team obtained audio samples from the films and then altered them for originality. The animation team then altered their T. rex roaring animations to fit the sound effects. To design the dinosaurs the development team primarily referred to the films for consistency, while incorporating some of the latest scientific discoveries to add to their designs. The team also studied birds and other animals to aid in designing the dinosaurs. In addition to their designs, dinosaur behavior was based on a combination of the films and scientific findings. Paleontologist Jack Horner, who served as an advisor on the films, was also consulted for advice on the game's dinosaurs. They were given bright and colorful hides based on new dinosaur research.

In February 2017, Frontier's CEO David Braben announced the company was working on a new project based on an existing Hollywood property. The game was announced during Gamescom 2017 held in August. Later, on 7 October, footage showcasing the in-game engine was revealed during the first annual Frontier Expo. The game was digitally released for Microsoft Windows, PlayStation 4 and Xbox One on 12 June 2018, coinciding with the theatrical release of Jurassic World: Fallen Kingdom. Physical copies of the PlayStation 4 and Xbox One version were distributed by Sold Out beginning on 3 July.

=== Updates ===
Several updates were released for the game throughout 2018, and Frontier collaborated with Universal on each of them. A free game update based on Jurassic World: Fallen Kingdom, with six dinosaurs from the film, was released on 22 June. In August, Frontier Developments announced an upcoming patch that would alter the sizes of several dinosaurs to match their real-life and film counterparts. The update was released in September, and included additional sandbox and gameplay options, as well as the addition of Challenge Mode.

The first paid downloadable content (DLC), Secrets of Dr. Wu, was released on 20 November. The DLC introduced new story missions, research options and new dinosaur and hybrid species. On the same day, Frontier introduced new AI behaviors and a day-night cycle into the game via a free update. Frontier released the Cretaceous Dinosaur Pack and the Carnivore Dinosaur Pack in December 2018 and April 2019 respectively. Each dinosaur pack introduces three new dinosaurs species. In 2019, a paid DLC titled Claire's Sanctuary was released on 18 June. Set after Fallen Kingdom, the expansion features a standalone campaign which sees players relocating the remaining dinosaurs trapped on Isla Nublar to Sanctuary Island.

Another paid DLC pack, titled Return to Jurassic Park, was released on 10 December. The DLC includes park features and locations from the original Jurassic Park featured in the first film. The DLC also includes Isla Sorna, the island featured in the films The Lost World: Jurassic Park (1997) and Jurassic Park III (2001). It also features seven new missions with new voice work by Goldblum, as well as Sam Neill and Laura Dern, the latter reprising their roles as Dr. Alan Grant and Dr. Ellie Sattler. The DLC reunites the three actors for the first time since the original 1993 film. Return to Jurassic Park features an original story that takes place shortly after the first film, ignoring the sequels. In the story, Grant, Malcolm and Sattler return to Isla Nublar and attempt to get the park operational.

For months, Frontier tried to arrange for Neill, Goldblum and Dern to record their lines together, but scheduling issues prevented this from occurring. Instead, recordings of one actor would be played for the others to aid them in recording their own lines. The DLC also features the character of John Hammond, who was portrayed in the films by Richard Attenborough (1923–2014). In the DLC, Hammond was portrayed by voice actor Mackenzie Gray. Return to Jurassic Park was in development for a while as the Frontier team wanted to take its time to create a comprehensive DLC based on the first film. It is the biggest update created for Jurassic World Evolution. Executive producer Rich Newbold said: "Essentially, the whole game has been rebuilt with a Jurassic Park version of every building". Dinosaur designs based on The Lost World: Jurassic Park and Jurassic Park III were also introduced in the DLC. For reference, Universal provided the developers with original assets and audio files from the film production archives to ensure that the dinosaurs move, sound, and look like their film counterparts. The package introduced Compsognathus and Pteranodon, as well as new designs for the game's Tyrannosaurus rex and Velociraptor, matching their original appearance in the first film.

A Nintendo Switch port of the game, titled Jurassic World Evolution: Complete Edition, was released on 3 November 2020. It includes all the DLC packs and updates that had been previously released for the other platforms. The game is not compatible with Nintendo Switch 2.

Name	Release date	Description
Deluxe Dinosaur Pack	12 June 2018	The Deluxe Pack is a paid DLC pack that adds the Archaeornithomimus, Crichtonsaurus, Majungasaurus, Styracosaurus and Suchomimus as hatchable dinosaurs.
Fallen Kingdom Update	22 June 2018	The Fallen Kingdom update adds the Allosaurus, Baryonyx, Carnotaurus, Indoraptor, Sinoceratops, and Stygimoloch as hatchable dinosaurs. It also adds characters to the database and contains several bug fixes.
Secrets of Dr. Wu	20 November 2018	Secrets of Dr. Wu is a paid DLC pack that adds the ability to create new hybrids, being Ankylodocus, Spinoraptor, and Stegoceratops. It also adds Olorotitan and Troodon as hatchable dinosaurs, two new buildable areas, several new genes to alter a dinosaur's social and habitat needs, and an advanced storm defence building. The new content is added directly to the main campaign.
Cretaceous Dinosaur Pack	13 December 2018	The Cretaceous Dinosaur Pack is a paid DLC pack that adds the Carcharodontosaurus, Dreadnoughtus, and Iguanodon as hatchable dinosaurs.
Carnivore Dinosaur Pack	17 April 2019	The Carnivore Dinosaur Pack is a paid DLC pack that adds the Acrocanthosaurus, Herrerasaurus, and Proceratosaurus as hatchable dinosaurs.
Claire's Sanctuary	18 June 2019	Claire's Sanctuary is a paid DLC pack that adds paleobotany, allowing herbivorous dinosaurs to have increased ratings and lifespans when fed proper plants. It also adds the Jurassic Tour as a guest facility, two new buildable areas, and Albertosaurus; Euoplocephalus; and Ouranosaurus as hatchable dinosaurs. The new assets are featured in a new campaign that focuses on curing ill dinosaurs and rescuing them from Isla Nublar's active volcano: Mt. Sibo.
Battle at Big Rock Update	27 August 2019	The Battle at Big Rock update adds the Nasutoceratops as a hatchable dinosaur, which was featured in Battle at Big Rock. It also contains a number of bug fixes.
Herbivore Dinosaur Pack	17 September 2019	The Herbivore Dinosaur Pack is a paid DLC pack that adds the Dryosaurus, Homalocephale, and Nigersaurus as hatchable dinosaurs.
Raptor Squad Skin Collection	26 November 2019	The Raptor Squad Skin Collection is a paid DLC pack that adds new skins to Velociraptor to resemble the individuals featured in Jurassic World, being Blue, Delta, Echo, and Charlie.
Return to Jurassic Park	10 December 2019	Return to Jurassic Park is a paid DLC pack that has a campaign that focuses on restoring the original park, which involves Dr. Alan Grant, Dr. Ellie Sattler, Dr. Ian Malcolm, John Hammond, and a younger Cabot Finch. This campaign is set on the two new buildable locations and in the new Jurassic Park era (which solely features buildings and scenery in the Jurassic Park style). Compsognathus is added as a hatchable dinosaur, while a new aviary building is added to house up to 6 Pteranodon. There are also new model variants and skins for Ankylosaurus, Brachiosaurus, Parasaurolophus, Stegosaurus, Triceratops, Tyrannosaurus rex, and Velociraptor.

== Reception ==
=== Critical reviews ===
Reception

Aggregate score
Aggregator	Score
Metacritic	PC: 69/100; PS4: 68/100; XONE: 76/100; NS: 75/100

Review scores
Publication	Score
Destructoid	5.5/10
Game Informer	7/10
GameRevolution	4/5 stars
GameSpot	7/10
GamesRadar+	4/5 stars
IGN	4.5/10
PC Gamer (US)	71/100

Jurassic World Evolution received "generally favorable reviews" for the Xbox One and Switch versions, while the PC and PlayStation 4 versions received "mixed or average reviews", according to review aggregator platform Metacritic.

Critics praised the dinosaurs featured in the game. Sam Loveridge of GamesRadar+ liked the variety as well as the cutscene that was displayed when a dinosaur is released from the incubation center. She enjoyed being able to control the jeep and the ACU helicopter from a third-person perspective, a mechanic she applauds for allowing players to relate to the dinosaurs. She added that she "lost entire evenings to [the game] without even thinking" due to its relaxing nature. Game Revolution's Paul Tamburro praised the dinosaurs' design, in particular, Frontier's attention to detail and the dinosaurs' animation. James Swinbanks of GameSpot agreed, praising the dinosaurs. He also enjoyed the need to learn each dinosaur's personality, requirements and behaviors, adding the process is "surprisingly satisfying". Game Informer 's Daniel Tack liked that players can experiment with different genes, though he commented that it was not a "freeform experience". Dan Stapleton of IGN disagreed and felt that unlocking genes was tedious, describing the process as a series of "mandatory robotic actions". While he liked the dinosaur variety, he lamented the lack of pterosaurs and aquatic prehistoric reptiles at launch. Destructoid's Dan Roemer commended the inclusion of lesser- known dinosaurs species, singling out Giganotosaurus and Deinonychus.

The simulation aspect of the game received mixed reviews. Loveridge held a positive opinion regarding dinosaur management, as each species has their own needs and niches that players must fulfill. She felt the park management aspect, including the construction of facilities and utilities, was "minimal". Tamburro compared the simulation to RollerCoaster Tycoon and Zoo Tycoon. He enjoyed the chaos created when dinosaurs break out, but he was disappointed that dinosaurs did not attack the park's staff carrying out maintenance inside the enclosures. Philippa Warr of PC Gamer praised the dinosaurs but criticized the lack of attention to missions and individual guests' views and happiness ratings on the park. She also noted the simulation lacked depth, as buildings looked largely the same and the environment soon became stale. Swinbanks felt dealing with natural disasters and dinosaur breakout was exciting initially, but soon became repetitive. He also lamented the lack of new challenges presented in the later stage of the game. Tack criticized the tiresome aspect of simulation and the constant need to wait for objectives to be completed, comparing them to a mobile game. Describing the simulation as "shallow", Roemer criticized the lack of time constraints, cleanliness ratings, and a full day-night cycle. He was also disappointed by the small size of each island, which made park building "unfulfilling". Stapleton agreed, saying that the small islands limited players' creativity. He noted that players cannot speed up time in the game, a signature feature in many other simulators and builders, and criticized its exclusion as it forced players to wait aimlessly to get enough cash to perform an action.

The game's contracts garnered mixed opinions. Loveridge believed they helped introduce a structure to the game, though she commented that these missions did not form a cohesive narrative. Tamburro enjoyed the process of progressing from one island to the next, as each island has its own unique layout and landscape prompting players to create a new park that is different from the previous ones. He noted that the contracts helped players to unlock new items, but he felt they were not "exciting". Warr criticized the lack of variety featured in the missions, with different scenarios only presenting minor modifications and adjusting the difficult slightly. She also disliked the contracts for occasionally forcing players to complete missions that do not make sense, such as releasing a dinosaur to kill guests. Swinbanks also criticized three contract factions, adding that players' need to satisfy and balance all three parties demands as "arbitrary". Roemer praised Goldblum's performance, though he noted the overarching plot "goes nowhere". He described the game's progression system as "awful" and wished to skip them entirely.

The game's tutorial and guidance to players was criticized. Loveridge noted that certain missions were confusing with some late game objectives being presented too early, forcing him to dismiss them to progress. She singled out the tutorial section for being incompetent, failing to inform players about key aspects of the game such as power distribution and landscaping tools, which often create obstruction. and terrain errors that prevent players from constructing certain buildings and modifying the landscape. Warr noted pacing errors with the tutorials, saying that some of them showed up way too late.

Reviewers had mixed opinions of the game as a whole. Loveridge called it an intricate simulation game that fans of the series would enjoy, and she commended the many references to the film featured in the game. Tamburro agreed and called it the best Jurassic Park-themed game, though he noted that the game had more constraints than Frontier's previous park builder, Planet Coaster. Initially impressed by the game, Warr was disappointed after extended play time feeling the game was lacking depth. Swinbanks noted that despite its shortcomings, the game was "faithful" to the franchise. He felt that it was "a good park management sim in its own right". Roemer felt that the game's development was rushed, and the lack of depth was problematic. Stapleton called it a "bad" game for being largely boring.

=== Sales ===
Five weeks after its initial release, the game had sold one million copies through digital and physical sales. Seven months after the game's initial release, Frontier declared the game its biggest launch and revealed that more than 2 million copies were sold. As of March 2020, three million copies of the game had been sold.

=== Accolades ===
The game was nominated for "Best Audio Design" at the 2018 Golden Joystick Awards, losing to God of War. It won the award for "Game, Simulation" at the National Academy of Video Game Trade Reviewers Awards, and was nominated for "Excellence in Convergence" at the SXSW Gaming Awards, losing to Marvel's Spider-Man. It was also nominated for "Best Game Design" and "Best Audio" at the Develop:Star Awards.

== Sequels ==
A sequel, Jurassic World Evolution 2, was announced by Frontier Developments in June 2021, and released on November 9. Goldblum reprises his role for the game, which includes additional features, pterosaurs, and marine reptiles. The game takes place after the events of Jurassic World: Fallen Kingdom, and was released for PC, PlayStation 4, PlayStation 5, Xbox One, and Xbox Series X and Series S. It received positive reviews, with many critics citing it as an improvement over its predecessor.

A third game, titled Jurassic World Evolution 3, released on October 21, 2025 for PC, PlayStation 5, and Xbox Series X and Series S. The game introduced more additional features, such as genders, a mating system, juvenile animals, and a fully modular building system (similar to Frontier's other games Planet Coaster and Planet Zoo). The campaign mode follows the events of the film Jurassic World Dominion, where Goldblum once again reprises his role. The game was well received, with praise directed towards its visuals, customization options, and the addition of breeding and juveniles. Donovan Erskine of Shacknews deemed Jurassic World Evolution 3 the pinnacle of the series.

== See also ==
- Jurassic Park III: Park Builder
- Jurassic Park: Operation Genesis
- Jurassic World: The Game
