= Halona =

Halona or Hālona may refer to:

Hawai'ian language

- Hālona Blowhole, a geologic formation in Hawai'i
- Halona Cove, a location in Oahu used in From Here to Eternity

Zuni language

- Halona, one of the mythic Seven Cities of Gold
- Halona Pueblo, or Zuni Pueblo, a geologic formation in New Mexico
