= Jurassic World: Fallen Kingdom =

2018 film by J. A. Bayona

- Theatrical release poster
- Directed by: J. A. Bayona
- Written by: Derek Connolly; Colin Trevorrow
- Based on: Characters by Michael Crichton
- Produced by: Frank Marshall; Patrick Crowley; Belén Atienza
- Starring: Chris Pratt; Bryce Dallas Howard; Rafe Spall; Toby Jones; Ted Levine; BD Wong; Jeff Goldblum
- Cinematography: Óscar Faura
- Edited by: Bernat Vilaplana
- Music by: Michael Giacchino (Note: Original Jurassic Park themes by John Williams)
- Production companies: Universal Pictures; Amblin Entertainment; Legendary Pictures; Perfect World Pictures
- Distributed by: Universal Pictures
- Release dates: May 21, 2018 (WiZink Center); June 22, 2018 (United States)
- Running time: 128 minutes
- Country: United States
- Language: English
- Budget: $170–606.3 million
- Box office: $1.310 billion

Jurassic World: Fallen Kingdom is a 2018 American science fiction action film directed by J. A. Bayona and written by Derek Connolly and Colin Trevorrow. The sequel to Jurassic World (2015), it is the second installment in the Jurassic World film series and fifth installment overall in the Jurassic Park franchise. Chris Pratt, Bryce Dallas Howard, and Jeff Goldblum reprise their roles from previous films in the series, with Rafe Spall joining the cast. The story follows Owen Grady and Claire Dearing as they return to the fictional Central American island of Isla Nublar to save the remaining dinosaurs from an impending volcanic eruption, only to discover a mercenary team's ulterior motives to bring them to the US mainland.

Filming took place from February to July 2017 in the United Kingdom and Hawaii. With a production budget ranging from $170–606 million, Fallen Kingdom is one of the most expensive films ever made. Fallen Kingdom premiered at the WiZink Center in Madrid on May 21, 2018, and was theatrically released in the United States on June 22, by Universal Pictures. The film grossed over $1.3 billion worldwide, making it the third Jurassic film to pass the billion-dollar mark, and was the third-highest-grossing film of 2018 and peaked as the 12th-highest-grossing film of all time. It received mixed reviews from critics, who generally praised the visuals, cinematography, music, and darker tone, while others criticized the screenplay. A sequel, titled Jurassic World Dominion was released in 2022.

== Plot ==
Six months after the Jurassic World incident and the Indominus rex's death, (Note: As depicted in Jurassic World (2015). Fallen Kingdom states that the events of Jurassic World occurred in 2015. According to writer Colin Trevorrow, Fallen Kingdom's opening scene takes place anywhere from a few weeks to six months after the events of Jurassic World. Jurassic World Camp Cretaceous confirms the time period is six months.) a small mercenary team arrives on the abandoned Isla Nublar to collect DNA from its remains in the lagoon. After a two-man team collects a bone sample, the Mosasaurus devours their submersible. Rexy the Tyrannosaurus (Note: Offscreen, this Tyrannosaurus is identified as the same individual from Jurassic Park (1993) and Jurassic World (2015), and is colloquially known as Rexy.) attacks the team, but the surviving members escape with the sample by helicopter. The Mosasaurus kills one of the men and swims through the partially open underwater gates into the open ocean.

Three years later, a U.S. Senate committee debates whether Isla Nublar's dinosaurs should be saved from an impending volcanic eruption. Chaotician Dr. Ian Malcolm testifies that the dinosaurs should perish naturally to correct the wrongful cloning done by John Hammond. Meanwhile, Jurassic World's former operations manager, Claire Dearing, has established the Dinosaur Protection Group to save the animals. After the Senate votes against government involvement in rescuing the animals, Hammond's ex-partner, Sir Benjamin Lockwood, invites Claire to his Northern California estate. Lockwood and his assistant, Eli Mills, reveal a plan to relocate the dinosaurs to a new island sanctuary. Claire is needed to reactivate the park's tracking system to locate the animals, particularly Blue, the last surviving Velociraptor. She recruits Owen Grady, former Velociraptor trainer, to help locate Blue.

On Isla Nublar, Claire and ex-park technician Franklin Webb reactivate the online tracking system. Owen, paleo-veterinarian Zia Rodriguez, and a mercenary team led by Ken Wheatley, track and find Blue. The encounter escalates, resulting in Blue being shot and Wheatley tranquilizing Owen. Wheatley abandons Owen, Claire, and Franklin on the island while forcibly taking Zia hostage to treat Blue. A volcanic eruption begins, causing a massive dinosaur stampede and forcing the trio to escape. The ship, loaded with captured dinosaurs, departs as the remaining dinosaurs are left behind to die in the eruption. The trio sneaks aboard the ship and helps Zia transfuse Blue with Tyrannosaurus blood from Rexy to save her life.

The captured dinosaurs are actually being transported to the Lockwood estate, where Lockwood's young, orphaned 9-year-old granddaughter, Maisie, overhears Mills and auctioneer Mr. Eversoll secretly planning to sell the dinosaurs on the black market. They will also preview the Indoraptor, a weaponized, transgenic dinosaur created by geneticist Dr. Henry Wu using Indominus rex and Velociraptor DNA. Wu needs Blue's DNA to create an improved Indoraptor that follows commands, unaware that her blood is no longer pure. After Maisie informs Lockwood about the auction, he confronts Mills, who refuses to obey his orders and betrays him by smothering him to death with a pillow. Maisie is later revealed to have been cloned from Lockwood's deceased daughter and the reason why Hammond ended their association. The auctioned dinosaurs are being immediately shipped out. Franklin evades capture and frees Zia, but Owen and Claire have been apprehended. Owen incites a Stygimoloch into breaking open their cell. The two encounter and meet Maisie and learn the Indoraptor is being sold despite Wu's protests that it is a prototype.

Owen disrupts and ends the auction by luring the Stygimoloch into the room. In the ensuing chaos, Wheatley tranquilizes the Indoraptor to extract a tooth as a trophy, but the hybrid, feigning unconsciousness, kills him, along with Eversoll and others, as it escapes. The Indoraptor chases Owen, Claire, and Maisie throughout the mansion until Blue, released by Zia, attacks and fights it. After a standoff atop a high glass roof, both animals crash through it; the Indoraptor is killed after being impaled on a ceratopsid skull, leaving Blue unharmed. When a hydrogen cyanide gas leak threatens the caged dinosaurs, Claire attempts to free them by opening the cage doors. Owen convinces her not to open the subsequent outer door, but Maisie opens it to save them, reasoning that they, like her, have a right to live. As Mills attempts to escape with the Indominus rex bone, Rexy devours him and tramples the bone. Owen, Claire, Maisie, Zia, and Franklin escape, while Blue, Rexy, and all the other different species of released dinosaurs flee the estate grounds.

In a new U.S. Senate hearing, Dr. Malcolm declares the beginning of a new age, where humans and dinosaurs must coexist. The closing scenes depict the freed dinosaurs roaming the wilderness and outer urban areas.

== Cast ==
- Chris Pratt as Owen Grady: A Navy veteran and ethologist, and former Velociraptor handler for Jurassic World.
- Bryce Dallas Howard as Claire Dearing: Jurassic World's former operations manager, now a dinosaur-rights activist, who has founded the Dinosaur Protection Group to save Isla Nublar's surviving dinosaurs.
- Rafe Spall as Eli Mills: Lockwood's ambitious assistant who recruits Owen and Claire to rescue the dinosaurs. Speaking of his character's actions over the course of the film, Spall said: "Ambition is such a powerful emotion, you can get wrapped up in it and end up doing things in order to succeed. This character believes he is doing right. He has been entrusted with pushing Lockwood's fortune into the future and making it survive after he dies. Mills feels he is simply doing what he was asked to do".
- Justice Smith as Franklin Webb: A former IT technician for Jurassic World who is now the Dinosaur Protection Group's systems analyst and hacker.
- Daniella Pineda as Zia Rodriguez: A former Marine who is now the Dinosaur Protection Group's paleoveterinarian.
- James Cromwell as Sir Benjamin Lockwood: Dr. John Hammond's former partner in developing the technology to clone dinosaurs.
- Toby Jones as Mr. Eversoll: An auctioneer host at Lockwood Estate who sells the Isla Nublar dinosaurs for profit. Jones likened his character to that of "a rogue arms dealer; he sees profits in selling these creatures as weapons. He is totally morally neutral about whatever he is selling. He is only interested in whether or not it will make him a profit".
- Ted Levine as Ken Wheatley: A seasoned mercenary who commands the rescue operation on Isla Nublar.
- BD Wong as Dr. Henry Wu: The former head geneticist of both Jurassic World and the original Jurassic Park. Speaking of his character's actions, Wong stated: "I do think he's motivated by his love for science and his own ego, which is well supported by his massive achievements ... I think he turns a blind eye to the human suffering that comes as a result because he thinks he's looking at some bigger picture".
- Isabella Sermon as Maisie Lockwood: Benjamin Lockwood's young granddaughter and legal ward following her parents' deaths.
- Geraldine Chaplin as Iris: The Lockwood Estate housekeeper, Maisie's nanny, and protector of the Lockwood family secrets.
- Jeff Goldblum as Dr. Ian Malcolm: An expert in chaos theory who once consulted for InGen's Jurassic Park and was a key figure involved in the 1997 San Diego incident. Goldblum spoke of his role: "It's small... who knows, they may cut me out entirely! But if I stay in, I'll be a sprig of parsley or a little garnish, hopefully with some impact!" Director Bayona confirmed that Goldblum's role is simply a cameo, as "he doesn't have a major role in the action but it's definitely a very meaningful one in terms of the story".
- Peter Jason as Senator Sherwood: An American politician who debates saving the dinosaurs before the volcano erupts.

== Production ==
=== Development ===
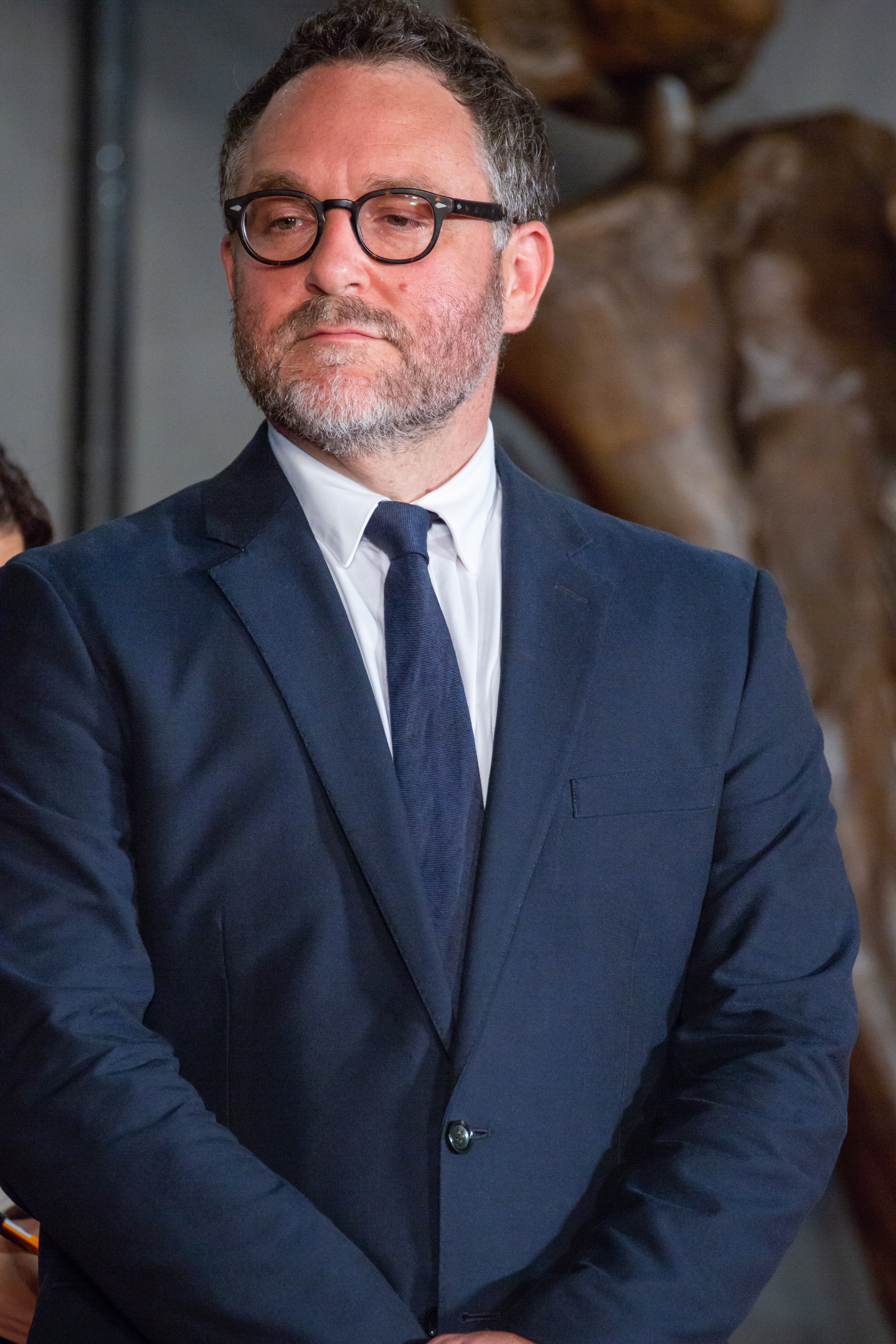
Co-writer and executive producer Colin Trevorrow

During early conversations about the 2015 film Jurassic World, executive producer Steven Spielberg told director Colin Trevorrow that he was interested in having several more films made. Trevorrow said in 2014 that they wanted to create something "less arbitrary and episodic" that could possibly "arc into a series that would feel like a complete story". Trevorrow also said he would direct the sequel if asked, but later decided against this, saying he would be involved "in some way, but not as director". He felt that other directors could bring different qualities to future films.

Trevorrow said in June 2015 that he was interested in seeing a Jurassic Park film made by one of several unnamed Spanish horror film directors. Jurassic World producer Frank Marshall met with Trevorrow and Universal Pictures later that month to discuss a sequel. Trevorrow suggested that the sequel would not involve a dinosaur theme park, as he felt future films could instead explore the idea of dinosaurs and humans co-existing. He said the film could involve dinosaurs going open source, resulting in multiple entities around the world being able to create their own dinosaurs for various uses.

=== Pre-production ===
Universal announced a sequel in July 2015, referred to as Jurassic World 2, scheduled for a June 22, 2018 release date in the US. Trevorrow was announced to write the script with his writing partner Derek Connolly, as they had for Jurassic World. It was also announced that the film would be produced by Marshall, and that Spielberg and Trevorrow would act as executive producers, while Chris Pratt and Bryce Dallas Howard would reprise their roles from the previous film. Pratt and Howard were paid $8 and $10 million for their involvement, respectively. Unlike its predecessors, Trevorrow said the sequel would not involve "a bunch of dinosaurs chasing people on an island", an idea that he found repetitive. Trevorrow spoke of the film's possible open-source storyline: "It's almost like InGen is Mac, but what if PC gets their hands on it? What if there are 15 different entities around the world who can make a dinosaur?"

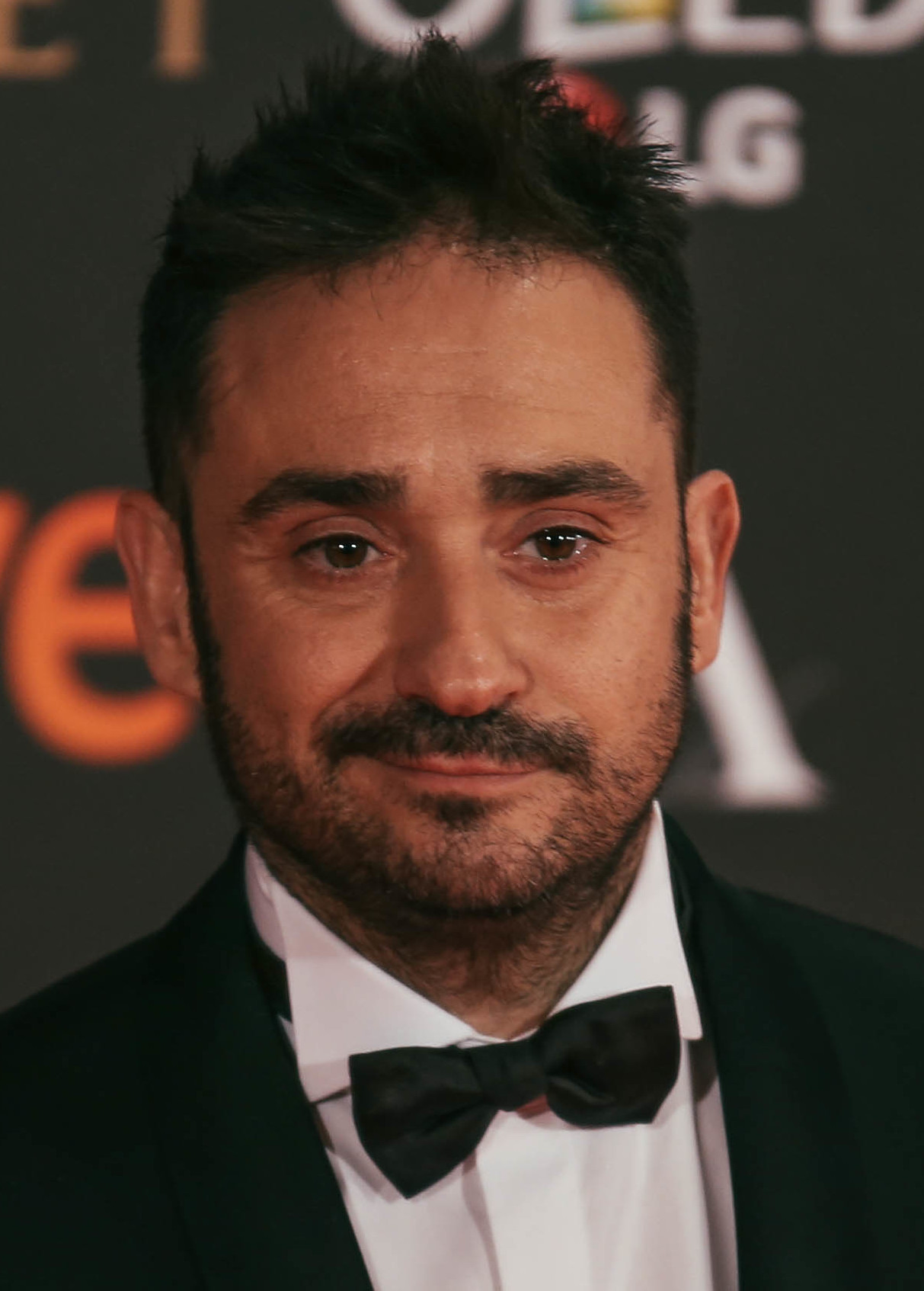
Director J. A. Bayona

By October 2015, horror director J. A. Bayona was being considered to direct the film. However, he chose instead to proceed with the World War Z sequel, a project for which he had already signed on. He dropped out of that project three months later due to other commitments, and was hired as Jurassic World 2 director in April 2016, with Belén Atienza and Patrick Crowley joining Marshall as producers. Spielberg, Marshall, and Kathleen Kennedy had been impressed by Bayona's 2012 film, The Impossible, and initially considered having him direct Jurassic World, which he declined as he felt there was not enough time for production. Trevorrow wanted Bayona to direct the sequel after seeing his 2007 horror film, The Orphanage.

Before he was hired, Bayona had met with Trevorrow and became enthused with the project after being told of the script's second half, which would play out like a haunted house film. After Bayona was hired, Trevorrow said of the film: "We're moving it into new territory. J. A. Bayona is an incredible director and I know he'll push the boundaries of what a 'Jurassic' movie is. I think it's important that we take risks. A franchise must evolve or perish". Bayona later confirmed the film would be the second chapter in a planned Jurassic World trilogy. He and Trevorrow worked closely throughout production. The film, under the working title of Ancient Futures, was in full pre-production as of July 2016, with storyboards being designed. Andy Nicholson was hired as the film's production designer. He spent four weeks with Bayona in Barcelona, discussing reference pictures and background details, as well as Bayona's ideas for the Lockwood mansion.

For the film's second half, where dinosaurs are transported by boat to the mainland, Ecuador and Peru had both been scouted as possible filming locations and settings. Marshall thought that Cabo San Lucas would be ideal, but these locations ultimately did not work for the film's story. Although the film would be shot partly in England, Spielberg felt the country was too far from the fictional Isla Nublar to be used as the in-film setting for the second half. He and the producers did not want the film to spend too much time on a boat. Crowley stated: "Rather than making it a movie about traveling on a boat, which is not very exciting, you needed to get to the place".

=== Writing ===
Although Spielberg was heavily involved in the development of ideas for Jurassic World, he had Trevorrow and Connolly devise their own ideas for the sequel. He retained final approval on the project. In June 2015, about two weeks after the theatrical release of Jurassic World, Trevorrow embarked on a road trip from Los Angeles to his home state of Vermont. Connolly agreed to accompany him so they could discuss a basic set of ideas Trevorrow had for the film. During their eight-day trip, they began work on the script and devised the basic story.

Trevorrow said the story was inspired by a quote from Dr. Alan Grant in the first film: "Dinosaurs and man, two species separated by 65 million years of evolution, have suddenly been thrown back into the mix together. How can we possibly have the slightest idea of what to expect?" He also said it was heavily influenced by the idea that "a mistake made a long time ago just can't be undone", and stated further that the film deals with themes of political megalomania, greed, and "making decisions with lack of care for how it affects people's lives".

The film is also based on concepts from Michael Crichton's novel Jurassic Park (1990) and its sequel The Lost World (1995), and includes dialogue from the first novel. Isla Nublar's volcano is in the first novel, and the writers chose to incorporate it into the film's plot. Trevorrow compared the destruction of Isla Nublar to "the burning down of a church or a temple. I honestly think it's like killing off a character in a way, and if you're going to do that, as long as you approach it with the proper respect and acknowledgement that you understand how indelible and permanent what you're doing is, then hopefully people will have an emotional response but they won't hate you for it". The idea to include a "silent partner" for John Hammond was also inspired by the Jurassic Park novel. Although the character of Benjamin Lockwood was not featured in the novel, the book depicts the early years leading up to the cloning of dinosaurs. This made Trevorrow realize there would have been many people involved in such a project, convincing him that someone like Lockwood would be among those people.

In his initial film treatment, Trevorrow had included story elements that Marshall and Crowley considered excessive for a single film. The producers felt it was important to include details about Owen and Claire's lives after the events of Jurassic World. Although the original ending was the same as the final film, Trevorrow had wanted to include more details about the integration of dinosaurs into the world. He chose to remove them to keep the story focused. The script's structure, Trevorrow said, was inspired by Spielberg's 2015 film Bridge of Spies, in which two seemingly unrelated stories "collide in the middle, and move on together". Trevorrow was also inspired by the 1975 film Three Days of the Condor: "It's one of those places where you think you know what the score is, and then everything changes, and then suddenly you don't know who to trust".

The film includes ideas previously featured in a rejected 2004 draft for Jurassic Park IV (later Jurassic World), presented in the same structure: a return to Isla Nublar followed by a second half set in a large Gothic building on the mainland. The idea of selling weaponized dinosaurs was also in the rejected draft, which Trevorrow had read while writing the first Jurassic World film. The concept of weaponized dinosaurs came from Spielberg. Because of criticism of the death of Zara in the previous film, Trevorrow said for Jurassic World: Fallen Kingdom: "We made sure that every death was earned. Everybody deserves their death in this movie, a lesson learned. In 2018 everyone earns it. Horrible people".

Regarding the idea of human cloning, Trevorrow said that "we're so much closer to cloning humans than we are to cloning dinosaurs. It felt like far less of a leap to me than dinosaurs do. [...] To have a character who has such deep love and has felt such loss and the inability to go on, I think is something we all feel. So the idea that you might be able to bring someone back in that way is emotionally grounded in a very universal idea". Trevorrow also said he was interested in "the larger impact" of genetic power, including its emotional impact and its potential human impact. He added, "we knew that we didn't want to continue to make movies about the dangers of messing with science. We want to tell a story about where we are now, which is that we have messed with science, we have fundamentally altered our world and now we're dealing with the consequences". Trevorrow was nervous about how audiences would react to the story's human cloning aspect, an idea supported by Spielberg, who was excited about the questions it could raise in the film's sequel.

One of Trevorrow's ideas was to include Jeff Goldblum's character of Ian Malcolm, who appeared in the franchise's earlier films. Trevorrow and Goldblum discussed dialogue ideas for Malcolm, and Trevorrow said he used a lot of dialogue from Crichton's Jurassic Park novel for the character. Marshall said that Trevorrow wrote Malcolm as "the 'Uh oh, danger, I told you so' kind of character". Trevorrow said of Malcolm: "I saw him as kind of Al Gore. He's got a beard now, and he's like, 'I told all of you this was going to be a disaster, and sure enough it is'".

The character of Lowery, a park control-room employee from the previous Jurassic World film, was considered for a return in Fallen Kingdom. Trevorrow ultimately replaced him with the character Franklin Webb, saying that Lowery did not have quite the same spirit: "We did like the idea of [Zia and Franklin] being pretty idealistic young people who are activists who really believe in the cause that Claire believes in. I wasn't really able to shoehorn [Lowery] into that, he's kind of a cynical guy". Actor Jake Johnson had met with Connolly to discuss his character's potential appearance in Fallen Kingdom, saying later that Lowery "is a different guy because of what he went through in the first movie. Like he's got a huge ponytail now. I pitched that he's got sleeve tattoos. The trauma of seeing a dinosaur attack really messed him up. I thought we could have some fun". In October 2016, Johnson said he and his character would not be in the film.

==== Bayona ====
After Bayona was hired, he began reading Crichton's novels - including Jurassic Park and The Lost World - for inspiration. He also re-watched each of the previous Jurassic Park films. Trevorrow and Connolly began working with Bayona in July 2016, to perfect the script to the director's liking. Bayona had his own ideas incorporated while essentially retaining the original story devised by Trevorrow and Connolly.

The film's underwater opening sequence was already in the script, and Bayona asked Trevorrow to push for it to become a bigger scene with a larger set. Because the film has a lengthy period until the action scenes involving the volcano, Bayona felt it was necessary to expand the opening sequence to be action oriented. He also expanded Blue's surgery scene, as he considered it a key moment demonstrating Owen's relationship with her. In addition, Bayona had modifications made to the sequence set on board the Arcadia, the ship that transports the dinosaurs. He felt the sequence was too lengthy and required some action, leading to his suggestion of Owen and Claire retrieving blood from the T. rex to aid in Blue's surgery. Bayona and Trevorrow removed certain moments from the final script that they believed would be better for the sequel, which would depict dinosaurs having spread around the world.

Trevorrow said Fallen Kingdom would be more "suspenseful and scary" than its predecessor: "It's just the way it's designed; it's the way the story plays out. I knew I wanted Bayona to direct it long before anyone ever heard that it was a possibility, so the whole thing was just built around his skillset". Trevorrow later described the film as "The Impossible meets The Orphanage with dinosaurs". Bayona said that with the first half of the film set on an island, "you have what you expect from a Jurassic movie", while the second half "moves to a totally different environment that feels more suspenseful, darker, claustrophobic, and even has this kind of gothic element, which I love". The "gothic element" of suspense was influenced by Alfred Hitchcock films. Bayona compared the film to The Empire Strikes Back and Star Trek II: The Wrath of Khan, which were both considered darker than their predecessors. Regarding the mansion sequence in which Maisie is chased by the Indoraptor, Bayona compared the scenes to "the classic ending of a fairy tale, of a Gothic story, like finishing at the top of the castle with the princess in the tower and the dragon chasing the little girl".

Trevorrow said the film's dinosaurs would be "a parable of the treatment animals receive today: the abuse, medical experimentation, pets, having wild animals in zoos like prisons, the use the military has made of them, animals as weapons". In Trevorrow and Connolly's draft, the dinosaurs would be sold rather than auctioned. Spielberg and Trevorrow liked Bayona's idea to have the sale changed to an auction, which Bayona believed to be "the best way possible to show the greed in those characters. Because all the people are together in the same room betting for the animals". Trevorrow said that they sought to explore "the uglier side" of humanity and "our cruel treatment" of living creatures. According to Trevorrow, the auction scene was initially envisioned as "a dirty, unsavory bunch of animal traffickers" but he said that Bayona "kept us from going too far", embracing the darker elements while adding his own "sense of playfulness and humor". Trevorrow described the final auction scene as "more like a Sotheby's auction for the super-wealthy" while stating: "I think it played much better for kids, and was the right choice when balanced against the poor treatment of the animals we were seeing, which could have become irreparably sad". Trevorrow said that with the auction, "the worst instincts of mankind are revealed. The first film was very clearly about corporate greed. This is just about human greed".

=== Casting ===
In October 2016, casting was underway for the role of a nine-year-old girl. Approximately 2,500 girls were interviewed for the part, which ultimately went to Isabella Sermon, marking her film debut. Tom Holland - who previously starred in The Impossible - had discussed a role in the film with Bayona, but did not believe he would be available because of scheduling conflicts. Toby Jones, Rafe Spall, and Justice Smith were cast at the end of the year.

Daniella Pineda, Ted Levine and James Cromwell were cast in early 2017, while BD Wong confirmed his return as Dr. Henry Wu. Geraldine Chaplin, who had appeared in each of Bayona's previous films, was also cast. To maintain secrecy, the Ancient Futures title was used in the casting phase. During auditions, references to dinosaurs were replaced with animals such as lions and grizzly bears. To convince the studio that Pineda was right for the role of Zia, Bayona had her demonstrate she could perform comedy and drama scenes, as well as improvise. Pineda auditioned seven times before being given the role. She auditioned for Bayona, Atienza, and Crowley but did not meet the cast until she arrived in England for filming.

Howard expressed interest in seeing characters from earlier Jurassic Park films return for the fifth installment. In April 2017, Goldblum was confirmed to reprise his role from the first two films as Dr. Ian Malcolm. Bayona considered Malcolm a "great character!" Marshall said: "The world has changed a lot since Ian Malcolm went to Jurassic Park and we need his point of view now more than ever. He told us about chaos theory, he was right".

=== Filming ===
Filming began on February 24, 2017, and the shoot included locations in England; most of the filming there took place at Pinewood Studios. Because of its large sound stages, the facility was considered perfect for the film's many interior scenes. After England, filming moved to Hawaii, which stood in for Isla Nublar. A post-credits scene is set at the Paris Las Vegas resort, where loose pteranodons from Lockwood's estate land atop the resort's Eiffel Tower. Scenes were also expected to be shot at Brecon Beacons National Park in Wales, but ultimately no filming took place there.

Óscar Faura served as cinematographer. The film is the first entry in the Jurassic Park series to be shot in CinemaScope, a widescreen 2.40:1 aspect ratio, as Bayona wanted to present the film as "bigger" and "more epic". The crew used Arri Alexa 65 cameras exclusively, making it the first film in the series to be shot digitally. Several scenes were shot to reference various films including From Here to Eternity (1953) and Dracula (1979), as well as Spielberg's films Raiders of the Lost Ark (1981) and E.T. the Extra-Terrestrial (1982).

Spielberg was shown scenes from the film during production and offered Bayona his opinions. Bayona said that making the film was the biggest challenge of his life. The original cut of the film was approximately two hours and 45 minutes, which the filmmakers considered too long. It was trimmed to two hours and eight minutes for the final cut. One scene removed for runtime reasons revealed the character of Zia to be a lesbian, an idea that came from Bayona and Trevorrow. The two chose not to include the deleted scenes on the film's home video release, believing there was nothing that would be of interest to viewers. The Pteranodons in Las Vegas is one scene that was cut but eventually added as the film's post-credits scene prior to the theatrical release.

During filming, and in between takes, Bayona used an iPod to play different types of music on set to inspire the actors, as he had done with his previous films. He also played sound effects from other films in the series, including a T. rex roar that he sometimes used to get a natural reaction from the actors. In particular, Bayona played unexpected sounds and loud music to scare Smith for certain scenes, as his character is portrayed as easily frightened. Bayona and Pratt discussed each scene involving Owen's character before it was shot, and many of Pratt's ideas were used in the film. Discussing Levine's character, Bayona said: "He came with this idea of creating this kind of military man. He just wanted to portray the most hateable character possible. [...] And he was so creative on set, trying to give ideas, bringing story notes to make this character more and more hateable".

The film includes several indirect references to U.S. President Donald Trump, including an idea from Trevorrow where a news ticker says the "U.S. president" has questioned the "existence of dinosaurs in the first place". Trevorrow included the line because he felt that there was an ongoing "strong denial of science" in the world. Jones was allowed to decide his character's appearance, which included a wig similar to Trump's hairstyle. An unscripted moment left in the film involves Levine's character referring to Pineda's character Zia as a "nasty woman", a comment that was previously made famous by Trump.

In Hawaii, scenes where characters are running were filmed with the use of the Edge Arm, a stabilized camera that was attached to a crane, which was mounted to a truck that drove alongside the actors. This specialized camera allowed for scenes to be shot steadily despite the truck being driven over rough terrain. The film includes a scene on Isla Nublar where Claire and Franklin are riding in a ball-shaped Jurassic World Gyrosphere ride to evade dinosaurs. It was shot in England, and at Kualoa Ranch in Oahu, Hawaii. Bayona described the scene as one of the film's biggest challenges.

In Hawaii, the Edge Arm was used to film the actors riding in the Gyrosphere as it was hauled on a trailer to simulate its movement. In England, an outdoor roller coaster track with a 40-foot drop was constructed for the Gyrosphere, which Howard and Smith rode in to shoot a scene where the ride plummets off a cliff and into the water surrounding Isla Nublar. Although this portion of the scene could have been shot with the use of a green screen, Bayona wanted the actors to express genuine fear. The last part of the scene was shot at Pinewood Studios, where a large indoor tank was constructed and filled with water to depict the submerged ride as Owen tries to break it open and rescue Claire and Franklin. This portion was filmed in five different takes that were merged to make it seem like a single continuous shot. Pratt was aided by a diving instructor while he shot the scene, which also involved Howard and Smith being underwater. Filming in the tank lasted five days, and it required a team of 85. It was shot primarily by a second unit crew, as Bayona was busy directing scenes on other sound stages.

==== United Kingdom ====
Filming in the United Kingdom began at the Langley Business Centre in Slough, England. Scenes shot at the business center included Claire's Dinosaur Protection Group office, old video diaries of Owen training his baby raptors, and Owen and Claire attempting to retrieve blood from the sedated T. rex. Much of the video diary footage was improvised by Pratt. Bayona, at the suggestion of his film editor, later decided to intercut Blue's surgery scene with footage from the video diaries.

In April 2017, filming took place at Hartland Park—formerly the Pyestock jet engine test site—in Fleet, Hampshire, England, where the film's opening sequence was shot. It was filmed through the night and involved helicopters, rain machines, and lightning simulators to depict a thunderstorm. Bayona described the opening scene as a "massive action piece" that resembled the prologues used in James Bond films. Filming also occurred at Loch Long in Argyll and Bute, Scotland.

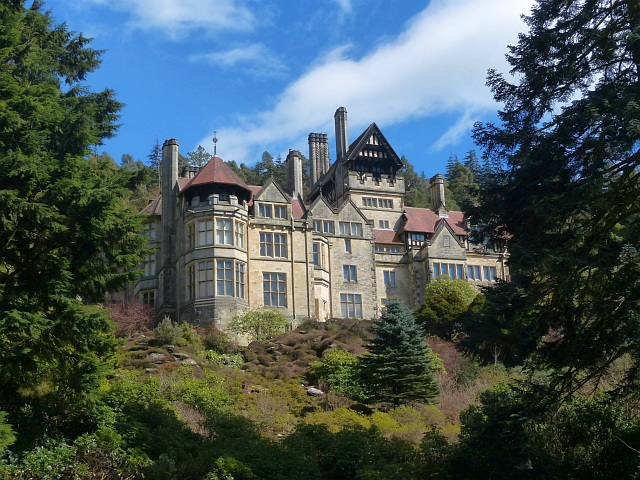
The Cragside house was used as the exterior of the Lockwood Estate.

Scenes were also filmed on sets at Hampshire's Hawley Common, where the exterior of Lockwood's mansion was built, as well as a mainland loading dock where the dinosaurs are brought. The exterior of the Arcadia was created entirely through computer-generated imagery (CGI) effects by Industrial Light & Magic (ILM), which worked on the previous films. The ship's interior was constructed by Nicholson and his team as a large set at Pinewood Studios, and after filming, it was rebuilt to depict the large rooftop of the Lockwood Estate. The exterior of the Cragside country house in Northumberland, England, along with its coniferous surroundings, was also used to depict the Lockwood Estate exterior. The film crew took plate shots of Cragside and used a computer to combine the shots with footage filmed on set to create the exterior of the Lockwood Estate. No actors were involved in the Cragside shoot.

Nicholson previsualized each of the sets he and his team built to ensure they would be large enough for the intended scenes. He noted: "Someone can tell you a Velociraptor is X-feet long, but until you see it in the space, you can't appreciate what that means in terms of your set and the action that needs to take place within it". The interior of the multi-floor Lockwood Estate was built entirely on sound stages at Pinewood Studios. The estate set included Eli Mills's office, Dr. Wu's large underground laboratory, an underground dinosaur containment facility, separate bedrooms belonging to Benjamin and Maisie Lockwood, and a large library with dinosaur skeletons and artifacts. When filming was completed in the Lockwood library, the set was redecorated and converted into the estate's underground garage, where the dinosaur auction takes place. Pratt said the film involved significantly more stunts than its predecessor. An improvised fist fight scene, between Owen and several men during the auction, was added late in filming. It was the first such scene to be featured in the film series, and was filmed in a single continuous shot with the use of a dolly track.

Scenes at Hampshire's Blackbushe Airport, standing in as an American airfield, were shot in May 2017. Filming in the United Kingdom concluded on June 10. Up to that point, Trevorrow was present as an on-set writer for each day of production so he could aid Bayona with any possible script changes. Goldblum shot his scenes in a single day at Pinewood Studios, during the last day of filming in the United Kingdom. Jones also filmed his scenes on large sets at Pinewood Studios.

==== Hawaii ====
Filming in Hawaii was underway as of June 13, 2017, and lasted more than 25 days, with locations that included Dillingham Airfield and Pua'ena Point. On June 21, filming began at Heʻeia Kea Small Boat Harbor, which served as Isla Nublar's shipping dock. More than half the harbor was closed for filming, which required the use of smoke machines. Scenes were scheduled to be shot there until the end of the month. Filming also occurred in a nearby Heʻeia jungle for scenes where Owen searches for and locates Blue. Their encounter takes place in front of an overturned Ford Explorer, previously featured in the original film as a Jurassic Park tour vehicle. Initially, Trevorrow thought of incorporating the vehicle into Jurassic World, before settling on the original Jurassic Park visitor center instead. Another filming location was Kualoa Ranch, which included the exterior set for a radio tower bunker.

David Vickery and his team at ILM created the volcanic special effects and consulted volcanologists for research. According to Vickery, the team asked "how a volcano of this type might erupt" and also requested information about "the various stages of lava and pyroclastic flow. We are speeding it up a bit for the sake of our film, but it is definitely all based on real science". The lava was created through digital effects, although one scene used cat litter set on fire as a stand-in on set, so the actors would know where to react. The scene was set in an Isla Nublar bunker as lava begins dripping from the roof. The litter had been soaked in flammable liquid, and was dropped from 12 different nozzles above the set.

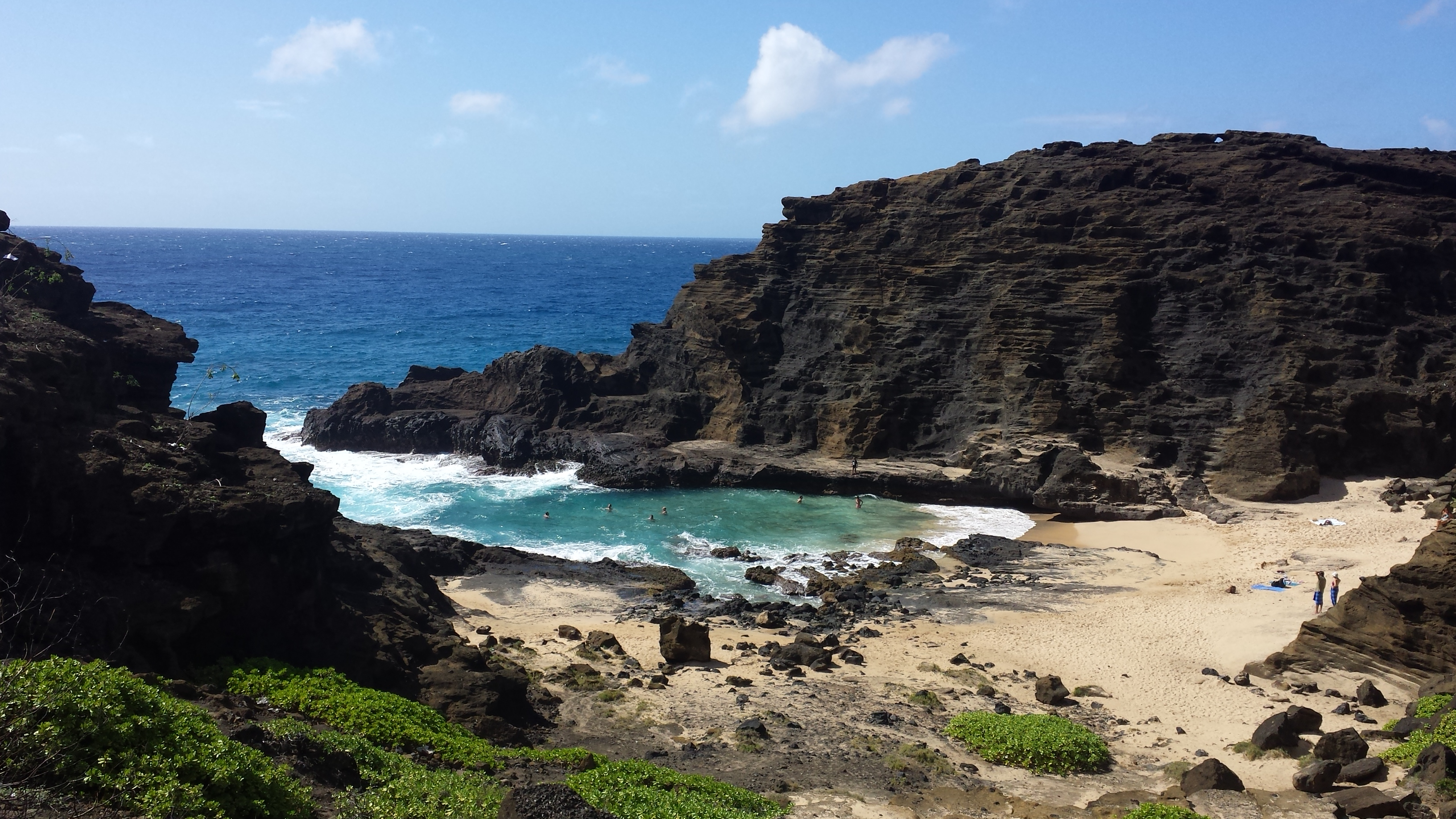
Hālona Blowhole

The Main Street section of the Jurassic World theme park was rebuilt on Police Beach in Hawaii for a scene where Owen and Claire return to the island. The set had been built previously in Louisiana for filming of the previous Jurassic World, but was dismantled after filming concluded. For the sequel, Nicholson had part of the Main Street practically built, although the park's visitor center could not be constructed in its entirety because of its large size. Unbuilt portions of the park were created by ILM using digital set extensions. Main Street was the largest set built in Hawaii, and required more than three months to complete. Many of the same prop makers returned to recreate the Main Street set, which then had to be aged to give the appearance of abandonment. Filming took place at Oahu's Hālona Blowhole on July 7, 2017, where Pratt, Howard and Smith shot scenes on a beach. Filming wrapped one day later.

=== Creatures on screen ===
The film's dinosaurs were created using a combination of animatronics and computer-generated imagery (CGI). Special effects artist Neal Scanlan served as the film's creature effects supervisor, while Vickery and Alex Wuttke were visual effects supervisors. Scanlan worked on the animatronic dinosaurs, while Vickery and his ILM team created versions of the dinosaurs through CGI. ILM animators in Vancouver worked on dinosaur stampede scenes, while ILM's London studio created the remaining creature scenes. Approximately 52 ILM animators worked on the film. In total, the film contains approximately 1,200 visual effects shots.

Scanlan worked closely with Bayona and Vickery to create the creatures. Vickery and ILM did extensive research to accurately create and depict the dinosaurs, which included consulting with paleontologists. The ILM team also referred to elephants and rhinos to determine how the dinosaurs should move and behave. Dinosaur expert John Hankla, of the Denver Museum of Nature and Science, served as an advisor on the film. Hankla also provided several dinosaur fossil recreations for the film, including an accurately sized Velociraptor skeleton that appears in the background at the Lockwood Estate's library of dinosaur skeletons. After reading fan thoughts on dinosaurs and speaking with children, Bayona realized that dinosaur textures and colors were often brought up and said: "I thought that was the area where I could play with. They feel somehow a little bit more exotic and richer in this movie". New research had also suggested that real dinosaurs were more colorful and brighter than previously thought.

The film features more dinosaurs than any previous film in the series. Bayona wanted to include several new dinosaurs never seen in earlier films, including Allosaurus, Baryonyx, Carnotaurus, Sinoceratops, Stygimoloch, and the fictional Indoraptor. Initially, the film was to feature two Indoraptors, a white one and a black one, the latter of which would kill the former in what Bayona considered similar to Cain and Abel. The white Indoraptor was eventually removed from the script as the story was considered detailed enough without it. Dilophosaurus was featured in the script, but its scene went un-filmed as Bayona decided it was not necessary. The scene would take place on board the Arcadia, in which Owen and Claire would encounter the Dilophosaurus in a cage. Bayona felt that the scenes on board the ship were long enough already. Baryonyx and Carnotaurus were among the creatures created through CGI.

Having directed Jurassic World, Trevorrow was familiar with how animatronics worked and wrote scenes for the sequel that would allow for their use. For example, animatronics are incapable of certain actions such as running. The film features more animatronic dinosaurs than any previous sequel, and the animatronics used were more technologically advanced than in the earlier films. Five animatronic dinosaurs were created for the film, whereas the previous film featured only one. More animatronics were used because the film features closer interaction between humans and dinosaurs than its predecessor, including a scene where Howard rides atop the sedated T. rex. Bayona said that animatronics "are very helpful on set, especially for the actors so they have something to perform against. There's an extra excitement if they can act in front of something real". Scanlan felt animatronics were not best for every scene: "In some ways it will have an impact on your shooting schedule; you have to take time to film with an animatronic. In the balance, we ask ourselves if it is economically and artistically more valuable to do it that way, or as a post-production effect".

Spielberg suggested to Bayona that he not overfill his shots with animatronic dinosaurs, in order to give the impression that the dinosaurs were bigger. Scanlan spent more than eight months at Pinewood Studios working on the creatures before and during filming, with a crew of approximately 35 people. His team created functional animatronic models of the T. rex, the Indoraptor and Blue, while ILM worked on CGI versions of the creatures.

- The T. rex was one of the first animatronic creatures needed for filming, in the form of a full-scale head and shoulders. ILM sent Scanlan a model of the T. rex from its appearance in Jurassic World. Scanlan used it to create a full-scale 3D print of the T. rex head and shoulders. The life-sized animatronic, which had the ability to breathe and move its head, was controlled with joysticks. It was used for a scene where the sedated creature is inside a cage while Owen and Claire attempt to retrieve blood from it. The beginning shots of the scene were created using only the animatronic, while the ending shots solely used CGI. The middle portion of the scene used a combination of the two methods. Within the film's story, the T. rex is portrayed as the same individual featured in previous films. Trevorrow said: "We've been following this same character since the beginning; she's the same T. rex that was in Jurassic Park and in Jurassic World. She is iconic—not just because she's a T. rex, but because she's this T. rex".
- The Blue animatronic was created to lie down on an operating table, depicting the animal in an injured state while the character of Zia operates on the creature. Up to 12 puppeteers, hidden under the operating table, were needed to control the animatronic during filming. The scene was shot twice, with and without the Blue animatronic, and the two versions were later combined for a seamless effect. In creating Blue through CGI, the animators referred to the animal's appearance in the previous film. According to Vickery, Blue's movements were designed to resemble a dog: "You look at the way Blue cocks her head and looks up at you. It's exactly like a dog. You're trying to sort of connect the dinosaur with things that you understand as a human".
- The Indoraptor was primarily created through CGI, while a practical head, neck, shoulders, foot and arm were created for close-up shots. For some scenes, an inflatable Indoraptor stand-in was operated by two puppeteers on set, to be later replaced by a CGI version of the creature. The Indoraptor was designed to have long human-like arms. The creature is depicted as a quadruped and biped, with a height of approximately 10 ft (3.0 m) tall while standing on two legs. Bayona chose black for the Indoraptor's color because he wanted the creature to have the appearance of a black shadow, saying "it's very terrifying when you see the Indoraptor in the dark because you can only see the eyes and the teeth". The front teeth and long claws were inspired by Count Orlok in Nosferatu.

Scanlan's team also made puppeteering aids, rod puppets, and several prop dinosaurs, all created by coordinating with Vickery to ensure a consistent result between the practical effects and CGI. Animal motions that could not be perfected with puppetry, such as blinking, were created with computer technology. Among the puppeteer dinosaurs were baby Velociraptor used for a scene with Pratt. The scene's final, wider shots used two-wheeled, remote-controlled toys to stand-in for the baby Velociraptor on set. The toys included a spring which gave them the ability to jump. The feature was used to get a genuinely startled reaction from Pratt.

Although motion-capture was used in the previous film to depict Velociraptor, ILM determined after several tests the technology would not be adequate for depicting dinosaurs in Jurassic World: Fallen Kingdom. They chose instead to use key frame animation done for the previous films. However, some motion capture was done as a form of previsualization to aid Bayona. ILM used key framing to create scenes involving a large number of dinosaurs and referred to high-speed photography of horses racing for aid in creating such scenes. A fight between Blue and the Indoraptor, set in Maisie's bedroom, was designed in London and key framed by ILM. Animation supervisor Jance Rubinchik said the fight was the "trickiest sequence" because of the lack of previsualization.

According to Bayona, a Brachiosaurus shown dying in the volcanic eruption is meant to be the same individual that is first seen in the original Jurassic Park. The Brachiosaurus in Fallen Kingdom was created using the same animations from the 1993 film. The dinosaur's death was the last shot on the entire film to be finished; Bayona and the post-production team struggled to perfect the CGI of the scene with only several days left to complete it. They worked through the final night to perfect the colors and composition, shortly before the film's release.

For advice on veterinary procedures and animatronic movements, the filmmakers hired Jonathan Cranston, a Gloucestershire veterinary surgeon, who was recommended because of his experience with the wildlife in South Africa. Cranston advised the cast and crew to help accurately depict complex veterinary procedures involving the dinosaurs. He also advised the puppeteers on creating subtle and authentic animal movements. Cranston was on set for 12 days, primarily at Pinewood Studios, and worked with Bayona on two scenes.

A list of creatures on screen is: Tyrannosaurus Rex, Velociraptor, Indominus Rex, Indoraptor, Mosasaurus, Carnotaurus, Baryonyx, Allosaurus, Ankylosaurus, Brachiosaurus, Gallimimus, Stygimoloch, Sinoceratops, Triceratops, Pteranodon, Stegosaurus, Parasaurolophus, and Apatosaurus

== Music ==
The musical score was composed by Michael Giacchino, who also composed the previous film. John Williams' themes from earlier Jurassic Park scores were incorporated by Giacchino. A soundtrack album was released on June 15, 2018, by Back Lot Music.

== Marketing ==
The film's title and first poster were unveiled on June 22, 2017. A six-second clip was released five months later. A full-length trailer debuted on December 7, 2017, preceded by several teaser trailers and a behind-the-scenes featurette of the film.

That month, Universal launched a website for the Dinosaur Protection Group. It included miscellaneous information about the group and its effort to save the island's dinosaurs, as well as a video featuring Howard, Pineda and Smith as their characters. The website also explained that Isla Sorna, the second island of dinosaurs featured in earlier films, is no longer inhabited. The website was designed by Chaos Theorem, a creative digital storytelling company founded by Jack Anthony Ewins and Timothy Glover, who worked previously on the Masrani Global website for Jurassic World along with their team Manuel Bejarano, Samuel Phillips, Ross Lane and Jaroslav Kosmina. Trevorrow and Chaos Theorem also created a website and campaign for "Extinction Now!" (the antithesis to the Dinosaur Protection Group), which was launched shortly before the film's release. The campaign included a found-footage clip of a Tyrannosaurus loose in San Diego, a reference to The Lost World: Jurassic Park.

A second trailer aired during Super Bowl LII on February 4, 2018. A 30-second teaser trailer was released on April 13, followed by a full trailer five days later. Several of the trailers and commercials included scenes from the film's ending that depict the Tyrannosaurus rex and the Mosasaurus now loose in the world. This frustrated Trevorrow, who preferred not to show such scenes before the film's release.

Universal spent $145 million on prints and advertisements promoting the film and had the benefit of a global marketing campaign by its partners valued at an additional $185 million, more than double the value of the previous film's partner program. The campaign included nine partners—Dairy Queen, Doritos, Dr Pepper, Ferrero SpA, Jeep, Juicy Fruit, Kellogg's, M&M's, and Skittles—who aired television commercials and sold products to promote the film. The global marketing campaign consisted of 1.3 billion promotional items, including 100 million boxes of Kellogg's products and 15 million packages of Kinder Joy candy by Ferrero. Dairy Queen, a returning partner from the previous film, sold "Jurassic Chomp" ice cream desserts in collectable cups, while Doritos and Dr Pepper marketed versions of their products that featured images of the film's dinosaurs. For Super Bowl LII, Trevorrow directed a Jeep commercial starring Goldblum and featuring a T. rex. Within 24 hours of its release, the commercial received 39.7 million online views, more than any film trailer watched online following its Super Bowl television debut. Universal also teamed up with Amazon for a marketing stunt where a dinosaur-sized box was driven around Los Angeles on a truck to promote the film.

Licensing partners Mattel, Lego, and Funko created toys based on the film. Mattel produced a variety of toys, including dinosaurs and action figures, as well as Barbie dolls featuring the likeness of Pratt and Howard as their characters. Mattel released a mobile app titled Jurassic World Facts as a tie-in to its dinosaur toys, which included symbols that could be scanned to collect facts about each creature. Lego released a number of Lego sets and characters based on the film. A video game, Jurassic World Evolution, was released simultaneously with the film. A two-part virtual reality miniseries titled Jurassic World: Blue, created by Felix & Paul Studios and Industrial Light and Magic, was released for Oculus VR headsets as a film tie-in, featuring Blue on Isla Nublar at the time of the volcanic eruption.

== Release ==
Jurassic World: Fallen Kingdom had its premiere at the WiZink Center in Madrid, Spain, on May 21, 2018. The film's international theatrical release began in Singapore and Malaysia on June 7, followed by the United Kingdom, India, Italy, South Korea and Angola on June 8. It was released in the United States on June 22, 2018.

Jurassic World: Fallen Kingdom was released digitally on September 4, 2018, and on Blu-ray, DVD, Blu-ray 3D and 4K Blu-ray on September 18.

== Reception ==
=== Box office ===
Box office revenue			Box office ranking		Reference
United States and Canada	Other territories	Worldwide	All time U.S. and Canada	All time worldwide	Reference
$417,719,760	$890,846,695	$1,308,566,455	No. 44	No. 25	

Jurassic World: Fallen Kingdom grossed $417.7 million in the United States and Canada and $892.7 million in other territories for a total worldwide gross of $1.310 billion, against a production budget of up to $464.5 million. The film crossed the $1 billion mark on July 5, 2018, becoming the 35th film of all time to reach this milestone, and the seventh film for Universal. It also made Universal the second studio (after Disney) to have at least two films in three different franchises make $1 billion worldwide, alongside Fast & Furious and Despicable Me. Deadline Hollywood calculated the net profit of the film to be $222.8 million when factoring together all expenses and revenues, making it the eighth most profitable release of 2018. Using the highest probable budget by Forbes, the film made a net profit of $185.5 million, not factoring in marketing costs or revenues from merchandise or home entertainment.

==== United States and Canada ====
In December 2017, a survey from Fandango indicated that Fallen Kingdom was one of the most anticipated films of 2018. Initial projections three weeks before its release had the film grossing $130–150 million in its opening weekend in the United States and Canada, with the magazine BoxOffice estimating a total of $325–380 million for its final domestic gross. By the week of its release, the low-end projections had reached $135 million.

The film was released on June 22, 2018, in 4,475 theaters (the second-widest release ever behind Despicable Me 3), grossing $58.7 million on its opening day, the second-highest of the franchise and 28th-best on record. The film grossed $15.3 million from Thursday night previews at 3,600 theaters, down from the $18.5 million grossed by Jurassic World. It ended up debuting at $148 million, the 20th-best opening weekend of all time and second-highest for Universal. It also marked the second time two films opened to over $100 million on back-to-back weekends, following Incredibles 2's $182.7 million debut the week before, since May 2007 when Shrek the Third and Pirates of the Caribbean: At World's End opened to $121.6 million and $114.7 million, respectively. The film was particularly popular among families, leading to an opening weekend that exceeded expectations. In its second weekend, the film made $60.9 million, a drop of 59% and less than the $105.8 million made by Jurassic World in its sophomore weekend. In its third weekend, it made $28.6 million.

==== Outside North America ====
Overseas, the film was released in 48 countries between June 6 and June 8, including France, Germany, South Korea, the United Kingdom, Israel, Italy, Russia, and Spain. It was projected to gross $130–145 million on its opening weekend. It made $20.2 million on its first day, including $1.4 million in France and $1 million in Indonesia. In South Korea, it grossed $9.7 million (₩10.3 billion) and sold over 1 million tickets, setting opening day records for both (beating The Mummy's ₩7.4 billion and Avengers: Infinity War's 980,000). It went on to have an international debut of $151.1 million, including $8 million from IMAX screenings. Its largest opening markets were South Korea ($27.2 million), the UK ($19.9 million), France ($10 million), Spain ($9.5 million), and Germany ($9.1 million).

In China, the film was released on June 15 and made $34.4 million (¥220 million) on its opening day, nearly double the first day total of its predecessor ($17.5 million). The film went on to open to $111.9 million (¥715 million), the fourth-best-ever in the country for a Hollywood release (behind The Fate of the Furious, Avengers: Infinity War, and Transformers: The Last Knight), and bringing its two-week international total to $372.1 million, more than the entire lifetime gross of Jurassic Park III ($368 million). In its third week of international release, the film made $106.7 million, bringing its total to $561.5 million. China remained one of the top markets, with $32.4 million (a standard 71% drop for Hollywood films in the country), while it was also released in Mexico ($12.3 million), Brazil ($9.2 million), and Australia ($7.9 million). As of July 5, 2018, the film had grossed $245.5 million in China, making it the fifth-highest-grossing Hollywood film of all time in the country.

=== Critical response ===
On the review aggregator website Rotten Tomatoes, 47% of 430 critics' reviews are positive, with an average rating of 5.40/10. The website's consensus reads: "Jurassic World: Fallen Kingdom adds another set piece-packed entry to the blockbuster franchise, although genuinely thrilling moments are in increasingly short supply." Metacritic assigned the film a weighted average score of 51 out of 100 based on 59 critics, indicating "mixed or average" reviews. Audiences polled by CinemaScore gave the film an average grade of "A−" on an A+ to F scale, while PostTrak reported filmgoers gave it an 82% overall positive score. The Hollywood Reporter found that some critics praised the film's visuals and its break from recent franchise installments with its darker tone, but noted criticism from others regarding the screenplay, "undeveloped concepts", and the feeling that the film franchise had run its course.

Variety's Owen Gleiberman called the film better than the first Jurassic World but wrote "... [Fallen Kingdom] ends up being just a so-so ride. I hope the next one is an all-out ride—but that for the first time since Spielberg's 1993 original, it's actually a great one. The audience for this series has proved that it will turn out in mega-droves". Lindsey Bahr of the Associated Press wrote: "Jurassic World: Fallen Kingdom will not stand up to rigorous scrutiny, and yet, it's kind of an enjoyable, preposterous and thrilling ride that ticks through nostalgia beats like a shopping list". The Boston Globe's Ty Burr likened the film to a "Universal Studios theme park ride" noting: "It's enough for a fun fright night at the movies but lacks anything else: character, mystery, wonder, danger. The film's a rush for an audience that only wants the high".

In a more critical assessment, Peter Travers of Rolling Stone said "...this sequel has the perfunctory vibe that comes from filmmakers who cynically believe the public will buy anything T. rex-related, no matter how shoddy the goods or warmed-over the plot". Senior Editor Matt Goldberg of Collider also criticized the screenplay stating that "the film is too lazy to even bother with the modest housekeeping of explaining its characters' motives". The Verge's Bryan Bishop was equally critical: "Like its predecessor, Fallen Kingdom is overstuffed with ethical conundrums, and not sophisticated enough to fully engage with them ... the movie's villains become such cartoony caricatures that it's impossible to take Fallen Kingdom's attempted philosophical musings seriously". Sam Machkovech of Ars Technica called the film a B movie consisting of "a sixth-grade sketchbook mash of dino-murder, cartoonish villains, and plot holes", while Travis M. Andrews of The Washington Post said the film makes dinosaurs boring.

In a positive review, Scott Mendelson of Forbes wrote, "Fallen Kingdom is a gorgeous, mostly enjoyable blockbuster that looked great in IMAX. That it doesn't cash all the checks it tries to write is why it's merely a good movie instead of a great one". Writing for The Hollywood Reporter, John DeFore also praised the film: "Finally making good on its name, J.A. Bayona's Jurassic World: Fallen Kingdom says goodbye to the park for good, not just carrying the de-extincted dinos off the island but freeing itself from the genre trappings of the previous four films". In a review for Empire, Ben Travis lauded the film, giving it four out of five stars and writing, "despite some familiar echoes of The Lost World, Fallen Kingdom also takes big, ballsy, irreversible strides, deriving tantalising logical conclusions from Michael Crichton's original premise and setting up a brave new World for this trilogy's final chapter". Sam Prell of GamesRadar+ compared the film to Star Wars: The Last Jedi, stating that both represent turning points for their respective franchises: "Both movies tear down the old to give us something new". IGN's Carlos Morales considered the film a Gothic fable rather than science fiction, noting a shift in tone from the previous films.

Many reviewers singled out the scene where a lone Brachiosaurus, stranded on Isla Nublar, succumbs to the volcanic fumes while the characters helplessly watch from the departing ship as "poignant" or "haunting", especially given the species' role in the first film.

=== Accolades ===
Award	Date of ceremony	Category	Recipient(s)	Result	Ref(s)
Teen Choice Awards	August 12, 2018	Choice Summer Movie	Jurassic World: Fallen Kingdom	Nominated	
Teen Choice Awards	August 12, 2018	Choice Summer Movie Actor	Chris Pratt	Won	
Teen Choice Awards	August 12, 2018	Choice Summer Movie Actress	Bryce Dallas Howard	Won	
People's Choice Awards	November 11, 2018	Action Movie of 2018	Jurassic World: Fallen Kingdom	Nominated	
People's Choice Awards	November 11, 2018	Male Movie Star of 2018	Chris Pratt	Nominated	
People's Choice Awards	November 11, 2018	Female Movie Star of 2018	Bryce Dallas Howard	Nominated	
People's Choice Awards	November 11, 2018	Action Movie Star of 2018	Chris Pratt	Nominated	
Visual Effects Society Awards	February 5, 2019	Outstanding Animated Character in a Photoreal Feature	Jance Rubinchik, Ted Lister, Yannick Gillain, Keith Ribbons for Indoraptor	Nominated	
Visual Effects Society Awards	February 5, 2019	Outstanding Virtual Cinematography in a Photoreal Project	Pawl Fulker, Matt Perrin, Óscar Faura, David Vickery for Gyrosphere Escape	Nominated	
Visual Effects Society Awards	February 5, 2019	Outstanding Compositing in a Photoreal Feature	John Galloway, Enrik Pavdeja, David Nolan, Juan Espigares Enriquez	Nominated	
Golden Raspberry Awards	February 23, 2019	Worst Supporting Actor	Justice Smith	Nominated	
Kids' Choice Awards	March 23, 2019	Favorite Butt-Kicker	Chris Pratt	Won	
Saturn Awards	September 13, 2019	Best Science Fiction Film	Jurassic World: Fallen Kingdom	Nominated	

== Sequel ==
The sequel, Jurassic World Dominion, began filming in February 2020, with Trevorrow returning as director and co-writer. Emily Carmichael is credited as co-screenwriter, with the script based on a story by Trevorrow and Connolly. Trevorrow also serves as executive producer with Steven Spielberg, while Marshall and Crowley served as producers. Pratt, Howard, Johnson, Sy, Pineda and Smith reprise their roles from the previous two films, while original Jurassic Park stars Laura Dern, Jeff Goldblum and Sam Neill also return to the franchise. Like Fallen Kingdom, filming took place at Pinewood Studios. Jurassic World Dominion was released on June 10, 2022.

== See also ==
- List of films featuring dinosaurs
