= Blowhole (geology) =

Hole at the top of a sea-cave which allows waves to force water or spray out of the hole

Blowhole

Blow holes are typically formed when sea caves erode inland and upward into vertical shafts that open near the surfaces. There is a 4-step process in the blowhole geology and where they are typically found. the formation of a blowhole is developed as littoral sea caves. Which is enlarged by wave erosion into vertical shafts that breached the surface. When the powerful waves hit the coast, the seawater rushes into the cave's catchment entrance and into the compression part of the cavern. As the water and air compress gets trapped under the hydraulic pressure creating the force that is needed for eruption. The pressurized mixture shoots out through the expelling port at the top. Producing a spray, sound, and sometimes strong reverse wind currents. Blowholes are normally found near fault lines or islands. and their repeated eruptions can further shape the coastline by continuing to erode surrounding rock.

== Mechanics ==
Blowholes are likely to occur in areas where there are crevices, such as lava tubes, in rock along the coast. These areas are often located along fault lines and on islands. As powerful waves hit the coast, water rushes into these crevices and bursts out in a high pressured release. It is often accompanied by a loud noise and wide spray, and for this reason, blowholes are often sites of tourism.

Marine erosion on rocky coastlines produces blowholes that are found throughout the world. They are found at intersecting faults and on the windward sides of a coastline where they receive higher wave energy from the open ocean. The development of a blowhole is linked to the formation of a littoral cave. These two elements make up the blowhole system. A blowhole system always contains three main features: a catchment entrance, a compression cavern and an expelling port. The arrangement, angle and size of these three features determine the force of the air to water ratio that is ejected from the port. The blowhole feature tends to occur in the most distal section of a littoral cave. As their name suggests, blowholes have the ability to move air rapidly. Strong reverse draughts in response to pressure changes in a connecting littoral cave can send wind speeds upwards of 70 km/h.

The formation of a blowhole system begins as a littoral cave is formed. The main factors that contribute to littoral caves formation are wave dynamics and the parent material’s rock property. A parent material property such as susceptibility or resistance to weathering plays a major role in the development of caves. Littoral caves can be formed by one of two processes: caves made of limestone are produced by karst (dissolution) processes, and caves made of igneous rock are produced by pseudocarps (non-dissolution) processes. In time the littoral cave enlarges growing inland and vertically through weak joints in the parent material. As weathering continues the roof of the cave is exposed, and the blowhole continues to enlarge, eventually the roof of the littoral cave is weakened and collapses. This creates a steep-wall inlet that allows the next stage of coastal morphology to progress.

La Bufadora is a large example of a blowhole located in the Punta Banda Peninsula of Baja California, Mexico. It consists of a littoral cave with a thin opening that has a recurrence eruption interval of 13 -17 seconds, ejecting water up to 100 ft. above sea level.

== Images ==
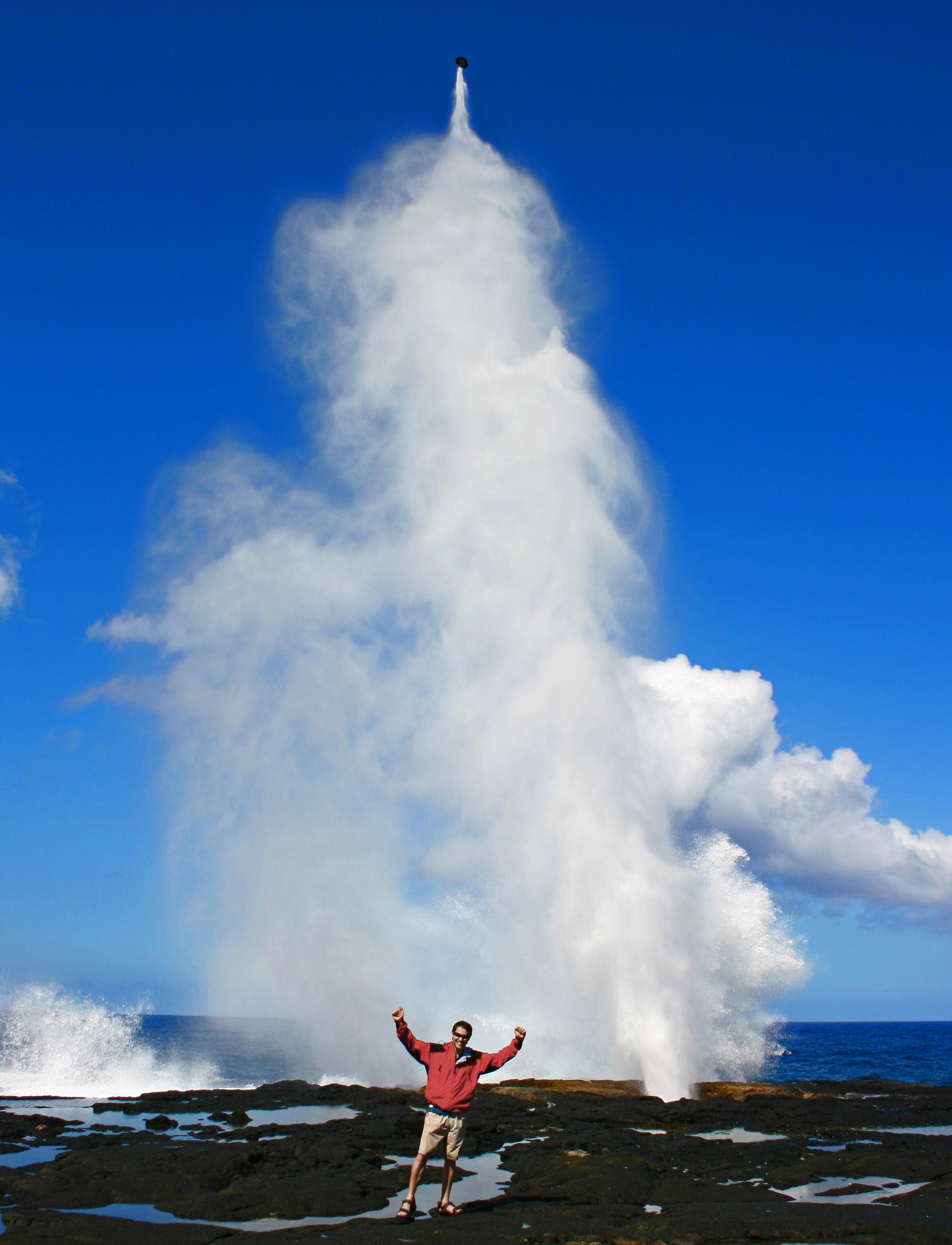
Alofaaga Blowholes on Savai'i Island in Samoa

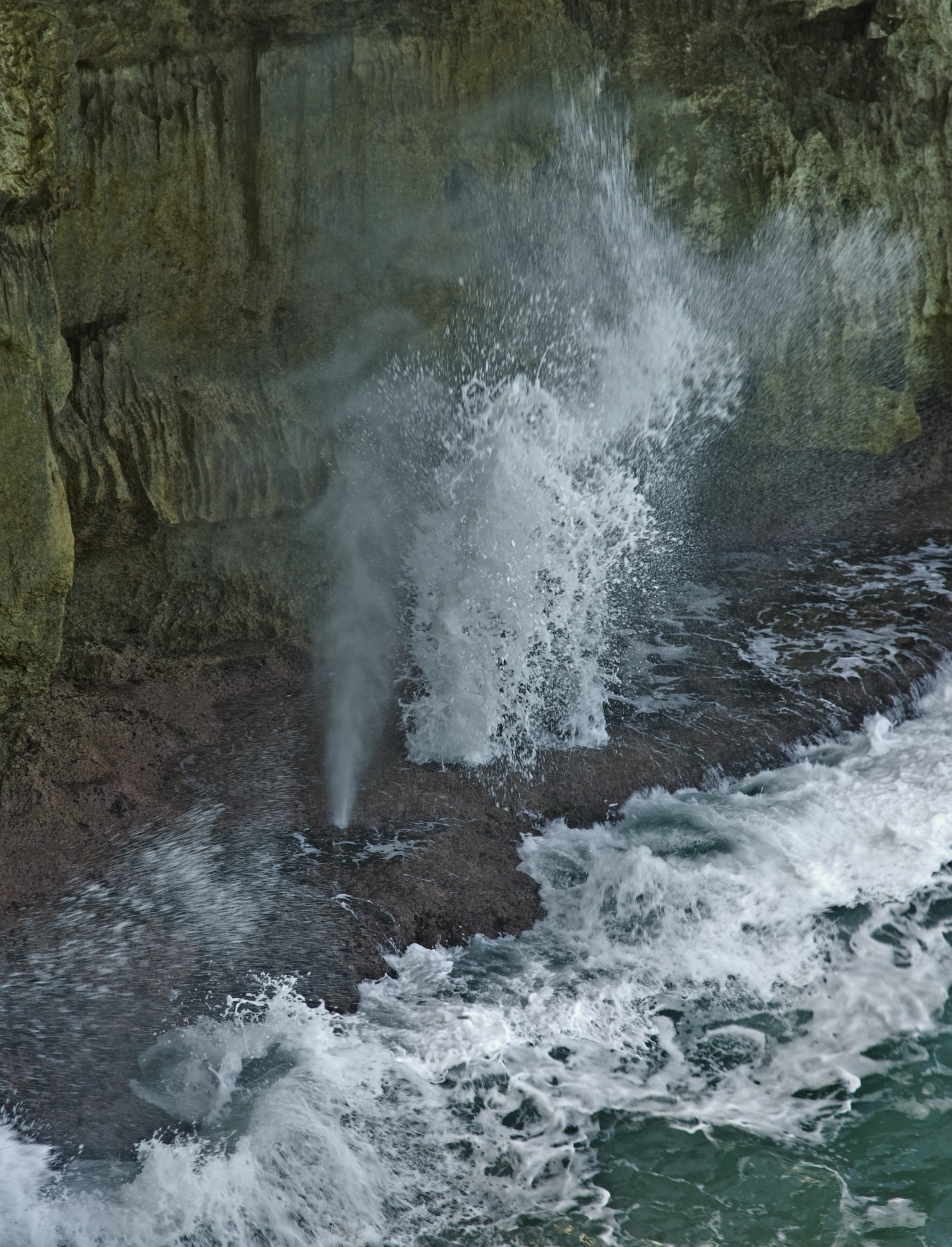
Blowholes, north coast of Barbados

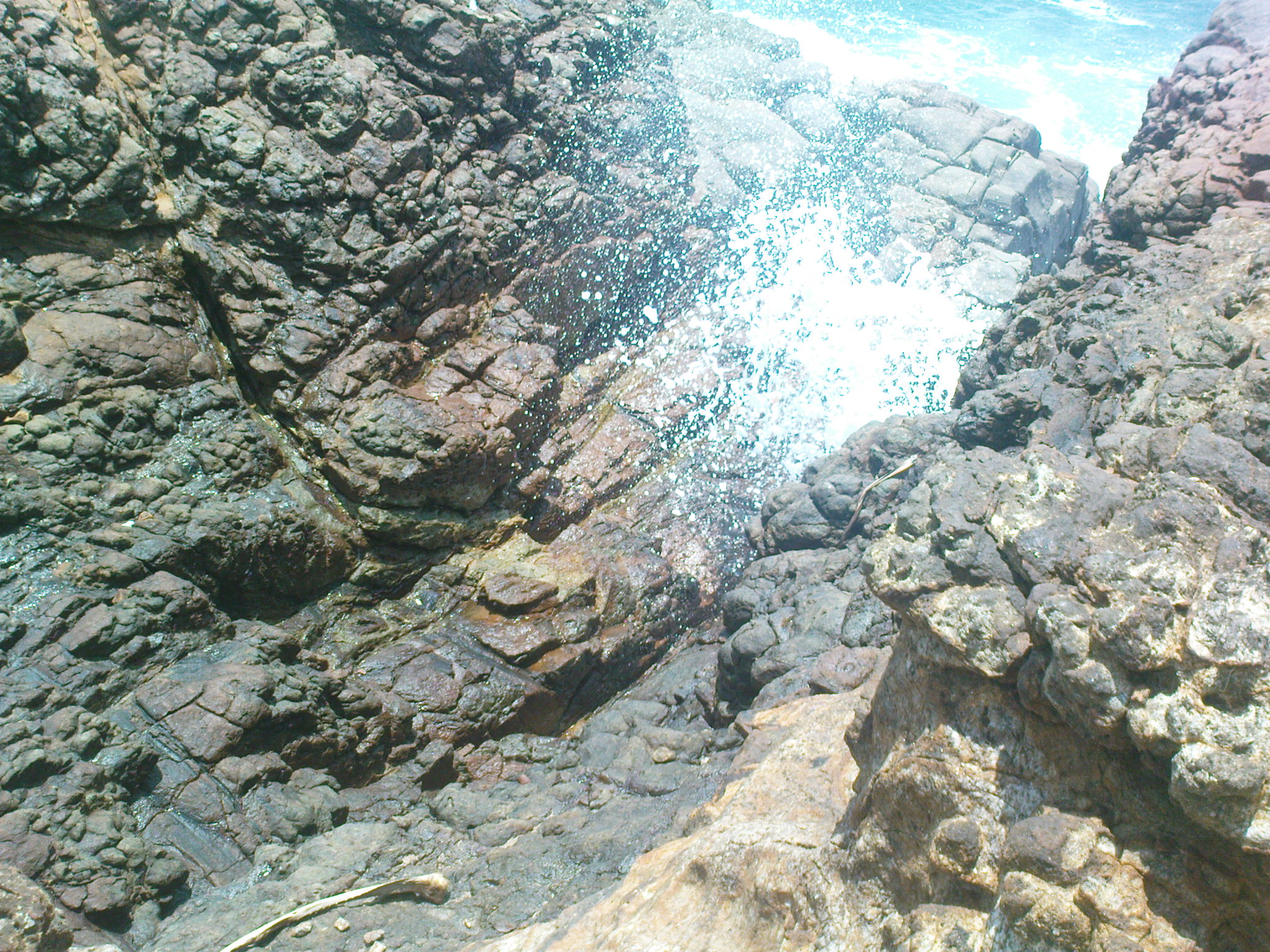
Hummanaya - A blowhole located in Southern Province, Sri Lanka

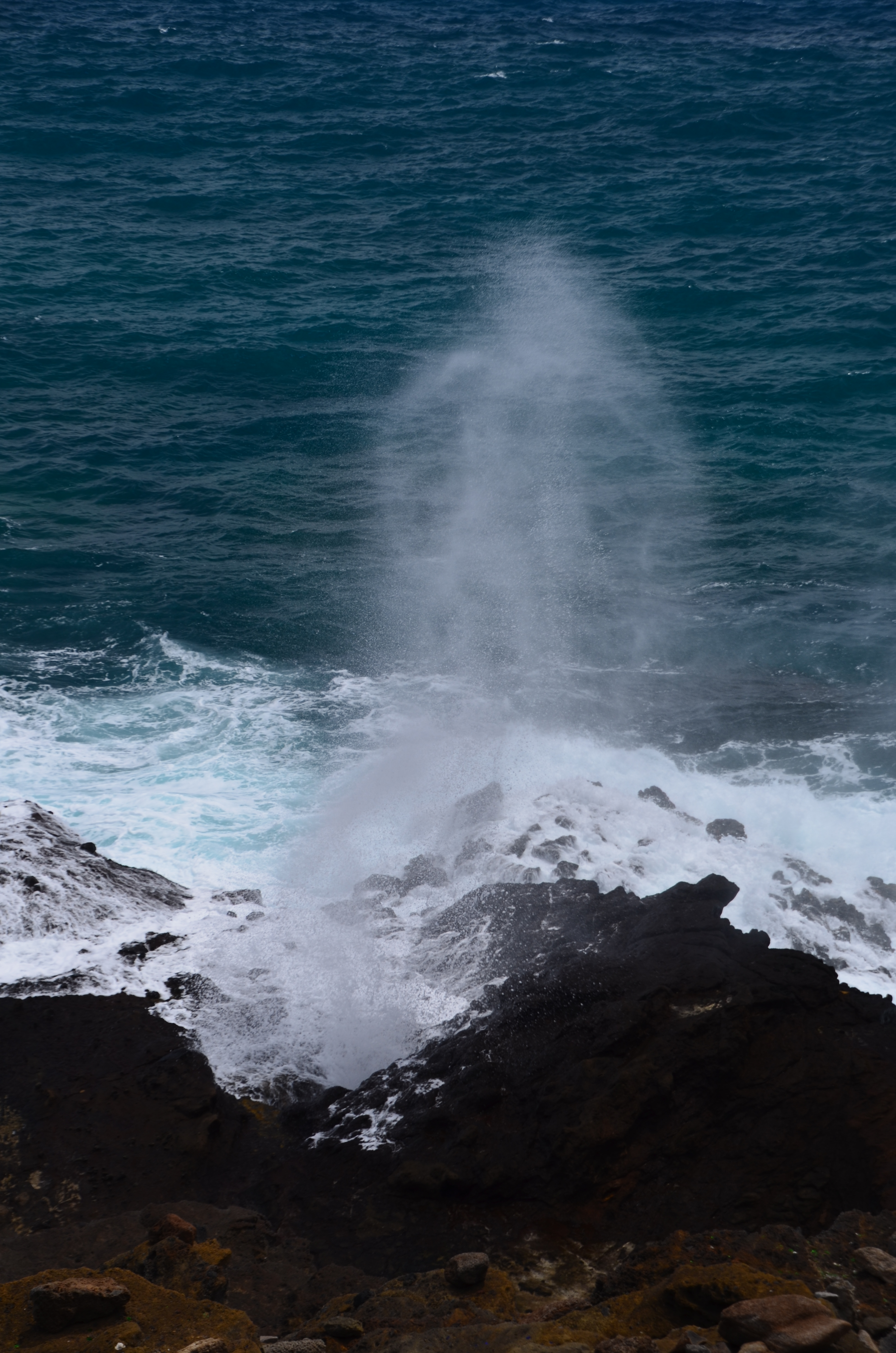
Hālona Blowhole, Oahu, Hawaii

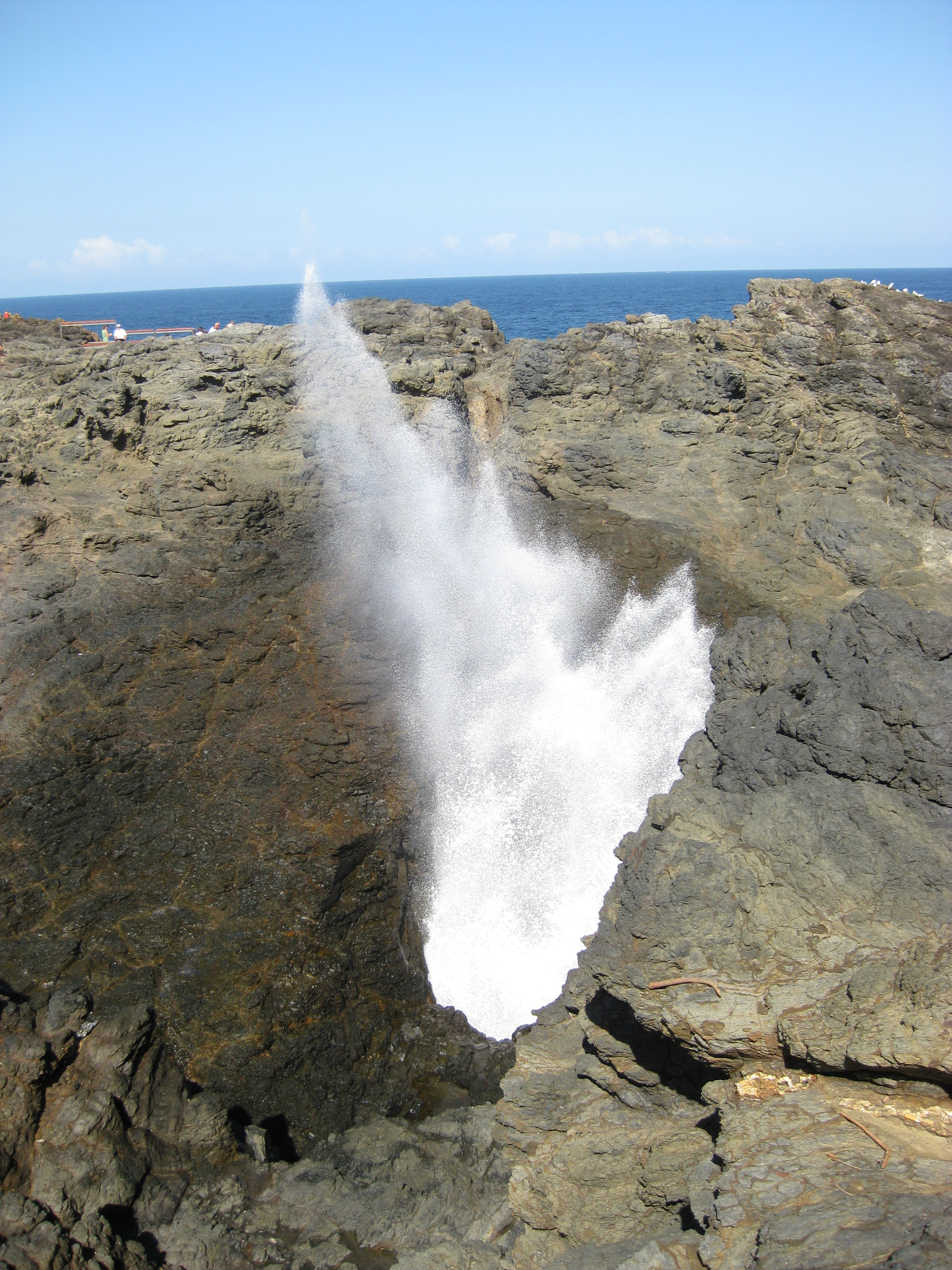
Kiama Blowhole, New South Wales, Australia

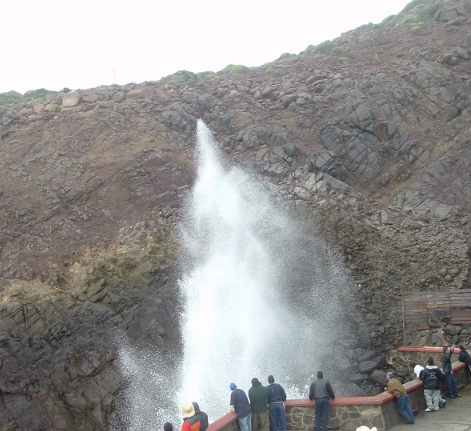
La Bufadora, Ensenada, Baja California

== See also ==
- Geo (landform)
