= Hummanaya =

Second largest blow hole in the world

Hummanaya Blowhole දික්වැල්ල හුම්මානය
- Blowhole
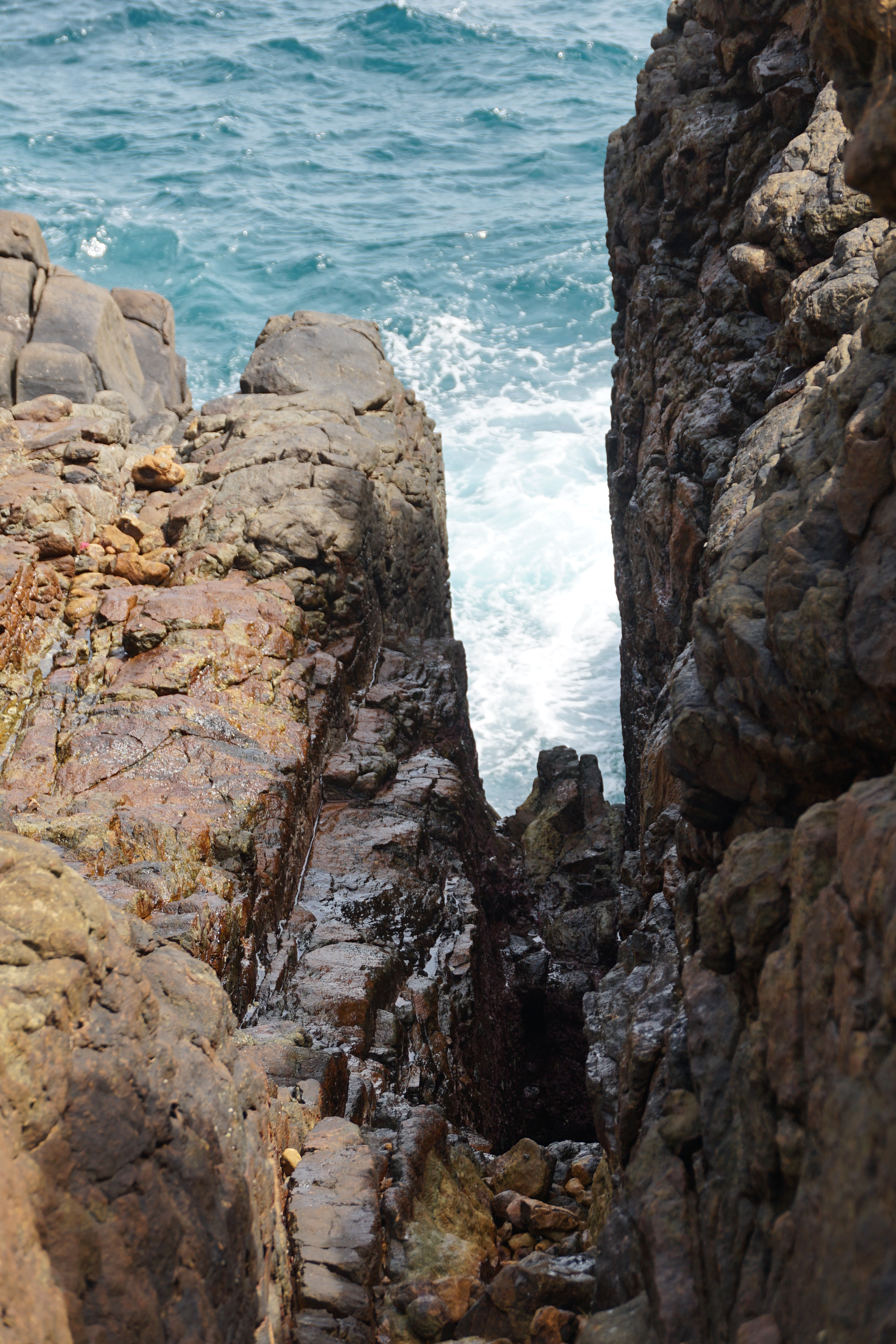

- location in Sri Lanka
- Coordinates: 5.9778905°N 80.7369175°E

Hummanaya Blowhole is the only known blowhole in Sri Lanka and it is considered to be the second largest blowhole in the world. Hummanaya (Sinhala: හුම්මානය = හූ+මානය) refers to the noise, "hoo", that can be heard a distance away when the blowhole is active.

== Location ==
The Hummanaya Blowhole is located 1.1 kilometres (0.7 mi) from the small fishing village of Kudawella, which is 28 km (17 mi) from Matara, 5 km (3.1 mi) from Dikwella and 12 km (7.5 mi) from Tangalle, in the Southern Province.

== Attraction ==
Hummanaya is a natural blowhole and is caused when sea water rushes through a submerged cavern and is pushed upwards. The sea water flows underneath the shore and then comes out of this hole due to pressure. The water fountain created by the geological feature shoots up every couple of minutes, depending on the nature of the sea, with the spray often reaching as high as 25 m (82 ft) to 30 m (98 ft).

This site has now been developed as a tourist attraction, with a small visitors' information centre on marine life and a viewing platform.
