= Papaʻiloa Beach =

Beach in Hawaii, US

Coordinates: 21.613050°N 158.094899°W

Papaʻiloa Beach, otherwise known as Police Beach, is located on the north shore of the island of Oʻahu in the Hawaiian Islands.

It was a prime filming location for the popular television show Lost. The production crew changed locations from the original beach (Mokuleia Beach) after the winter surf encroached upon the set constructed for the camp scenes.
