= Hālona Blowhole =

Rock formation and blowhole on the island of Oahu, Hawaii

Coordinates: 21.28221°N 157.67645°W

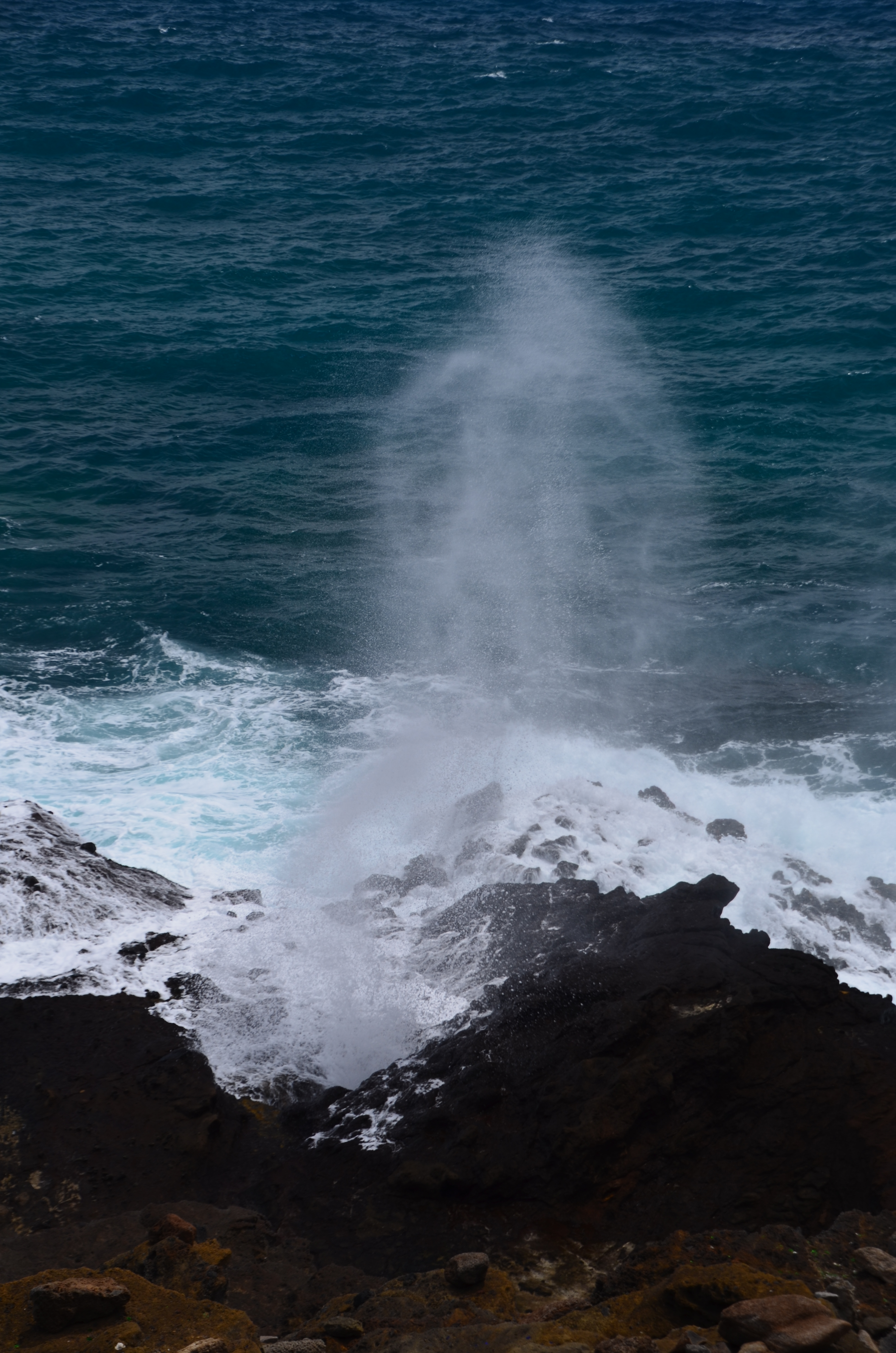
Hālona Blowhole

Hālona Blowhole is a rock formation and a blowhole on the island of Oahu, Hawaii off of Hanauma Bay at Hālona Point overlooking the Pacific Ocean. In Hawaiian hālona means "lookout".

== Description ==
On windy days when the tide is high, the ocean breeze sends the waves rolling on to the shore where the rock formation then shoots sea spray high into the air through the cave acting like a geyser. The blowhole is most active when the tide is high and the winds are strong, and it can shoot sea spray up to thirty feet high in the air.

Hālona Point is a tourist spot, with visitors coming for the scenery, the beach at the cove, and in the winter as a spot to go to see humpback whales or Honu turtles (Hawaiian Green Sea Turtles). The blowhole is perhaps the most popular rock formation of its kind found in Hawaii.

== Formation ==
The Hālona Blowhole was formed thousands of years ago during the period of volcanic activity in Oahu, with Koko Crater's lava flowing into the ocean. The lava tubes extend into the ocean which are narrow at the top. There is also a narrow rift along the base of the cliff which was formed by a large section of rock that broke away from the land.

== Hālona Cove ==
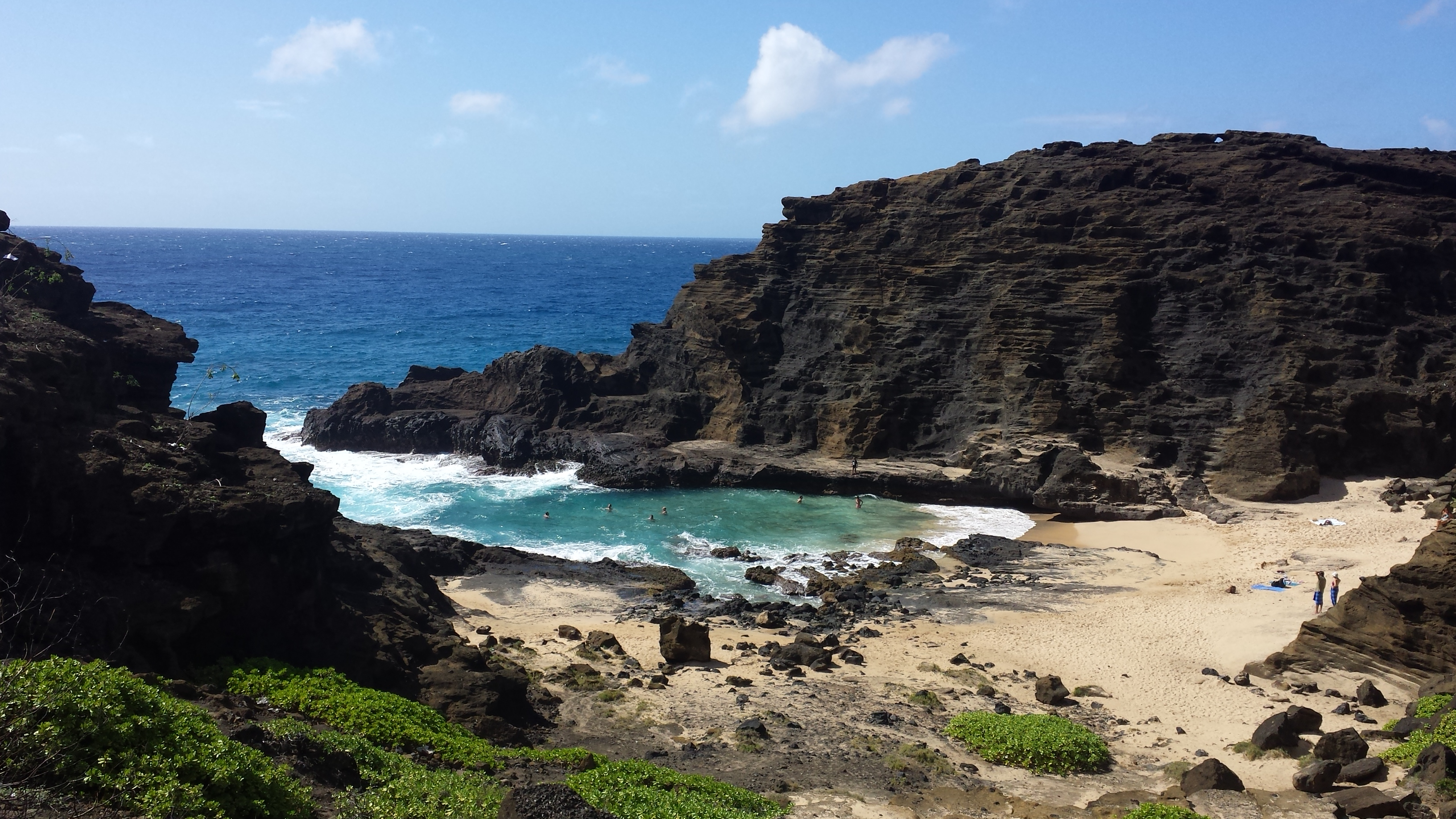
The cove next to the Hālona Blowhole lookout. Used in a number of films and music videos

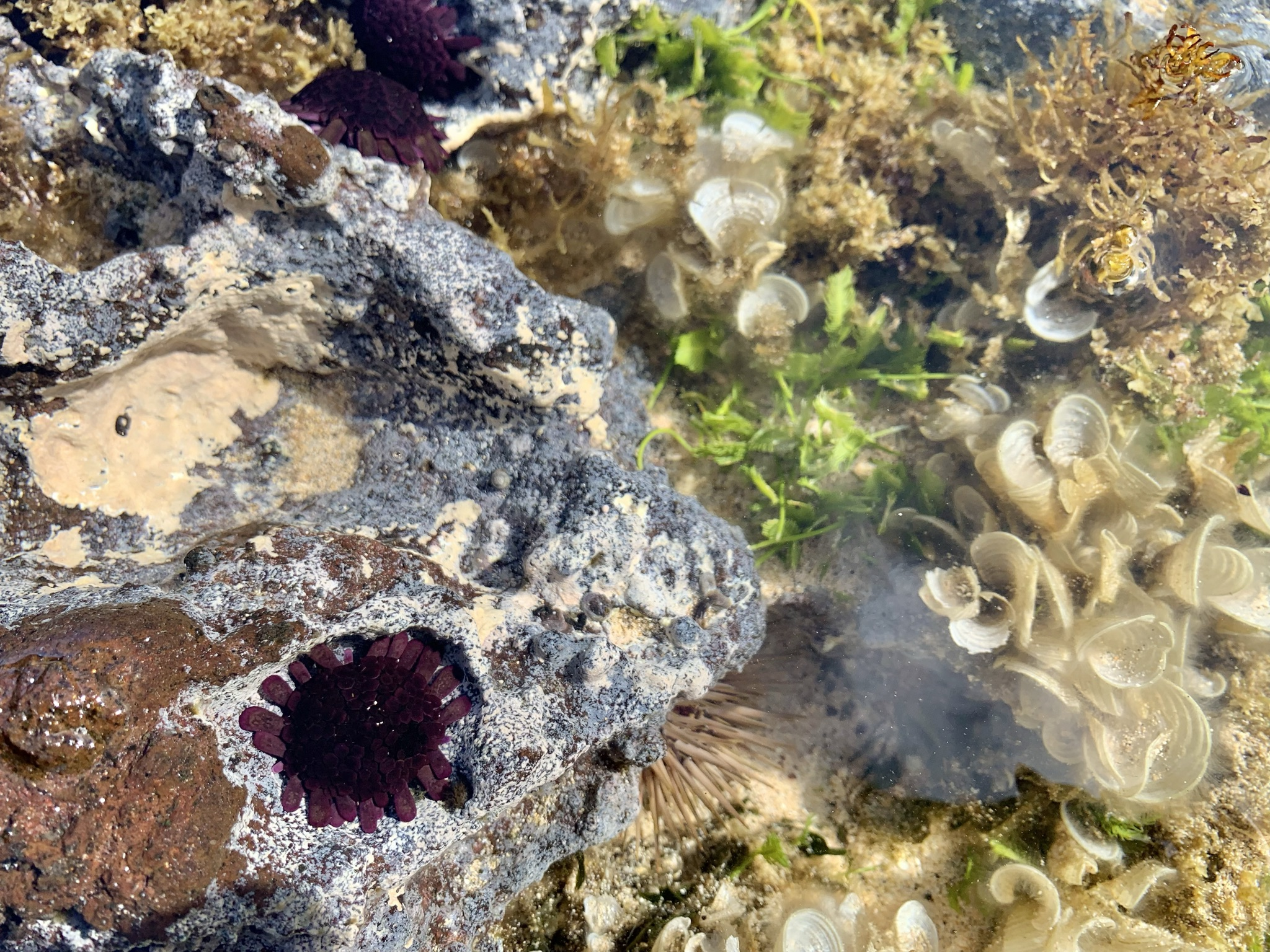
A Helmet urchin (Colobocentrotus atratus) within a tide pool near the Hālona Blowhole.

Hālona Cove, called "Cockroach Cove" by the local population, is the small pit of sand close to Hālona Blowhole, visited by tourists and locals for swimming when the surf is calm.

In a large wedged shape area next to the cove is a reef coated with Sinularia Leather Coral, with different species of fauna like echinoderms, slugs, corals, and eels.

=== In popular culture ===
This was the site of the sex scene between Deborah Kerr and Burt Lancaster in the 1953 film From Here to Eternity, and also between Drew Barrymore and Adam Sandler in the movie 50 First Dates. In 2012, the beach was featured in the music video for Nicki Minaj's "Starships". The blowhole was the location for a scene in Jurassic World: Fallen Kingdom.

== Dangers ==
Below Hālona is one of the most dangerous ocean currents in the world due to the Ka Iwi channel.
