= Tyrannosaurus in popular culture =

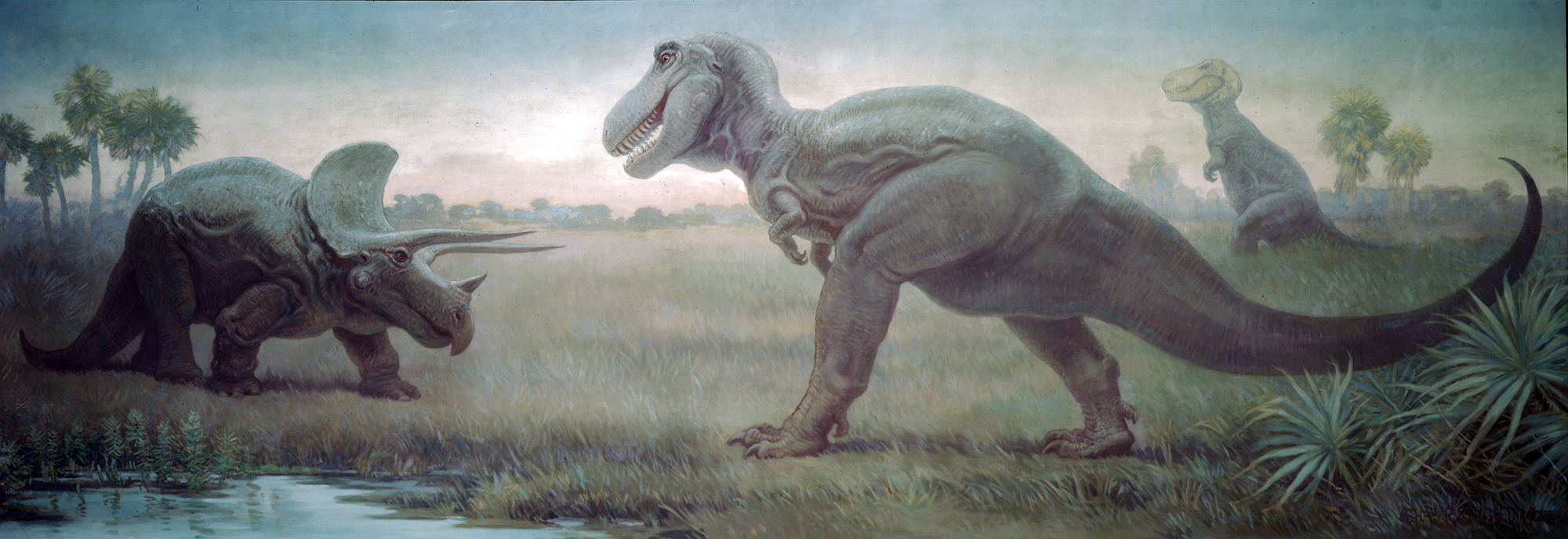
Tyrannosaurus facing off with Triceratops, Charles R. Knight mural at the Field Museum in Chicago, 1928

Tyrannosaurus rex is unique among dinosaurs in its place in modern culture; paleontologist Robert Bakker has called it "the most popular dinosaur among people of all ages, all cultures, and all nationalities". Paleontologists Mark Norell and Lowell Dingus have likewise called it "the most famous dinosaur of all times." Paleoartist Gregory S. Paul has called it "the theropod. [...] This is the public's favorite dinosaur [...] Even the formations it is found in have fantastic names like Hell Creek and Lance." Other paleontologists agree with that and note that whenever a museum erects a new skeleton or bring in an animatronic model, visitor numbers go up. "Jurassic Park and King Kong would not have been the same without it." In the public mind, T. rex sets the standard of what a dinosaur should be. Science writer Riley Black similarly states, "In all of prehistory, there is no animal that commands our attention quite like Tyrannosaurus rex, the king of the tyrant lizards. Since the time this dinosaur was officially named in 1905, the enormous carnivore has stood as the ultimate dinosaur."

Tyrannosaurus was first discovered by paleontologist Barnum Brown in the badlands of Hell Creek, Montana, in 1902 and has since been frequently represented in film and on television, in literature, on the Internet and in many kinds of games. Brown himself, despite having discovered many other prehistoric animals for the American Museum of Natural History before and after, always referred to Tyrannosaurus rex as "my favorite child". In Brown's own words, Tyrannosaurus rex was indeed "king of the period and monarch of its race... He is now the dominant figure in the Cretaceous Hall to awe and inspire young boys when they grow up."

== General impact ==
On finding Tyrannosaurus, Barnum Brown wrote to Henry Fairfield Osborn, his employer and the President of the American Museum of Natural History, "Quarry No. 1 contains the [...] bones of a large Carnivorous Dinosaur, not described by Marsh. [...] I have never seen anything like it from the Cretaceous." On realizing that the find was unlike anything ever found before, Osborn, according to Robert Bakker, "sat down to construct a name that expressed the position of Mr. Rex in the ecosystem, this apex of carnivory. The name has to be evocative, it has to be beautiful, it has to be lyrical. You hear it once, you remember it. [...] Tyrant. Lizard. King. Beautiful, short, you hear it once, you remember it and it can be abbreviated. T. rex."

Osborn and his Museum of Natural History had for years been in competition with the Carnegie Museum of Natural History and its famous Diplodocus skeleton, "Dippy" and had wanted something even greater for his own museum. With Brown's discovery of "the monster," Osborn's museum had its prize. He stated in 1905,

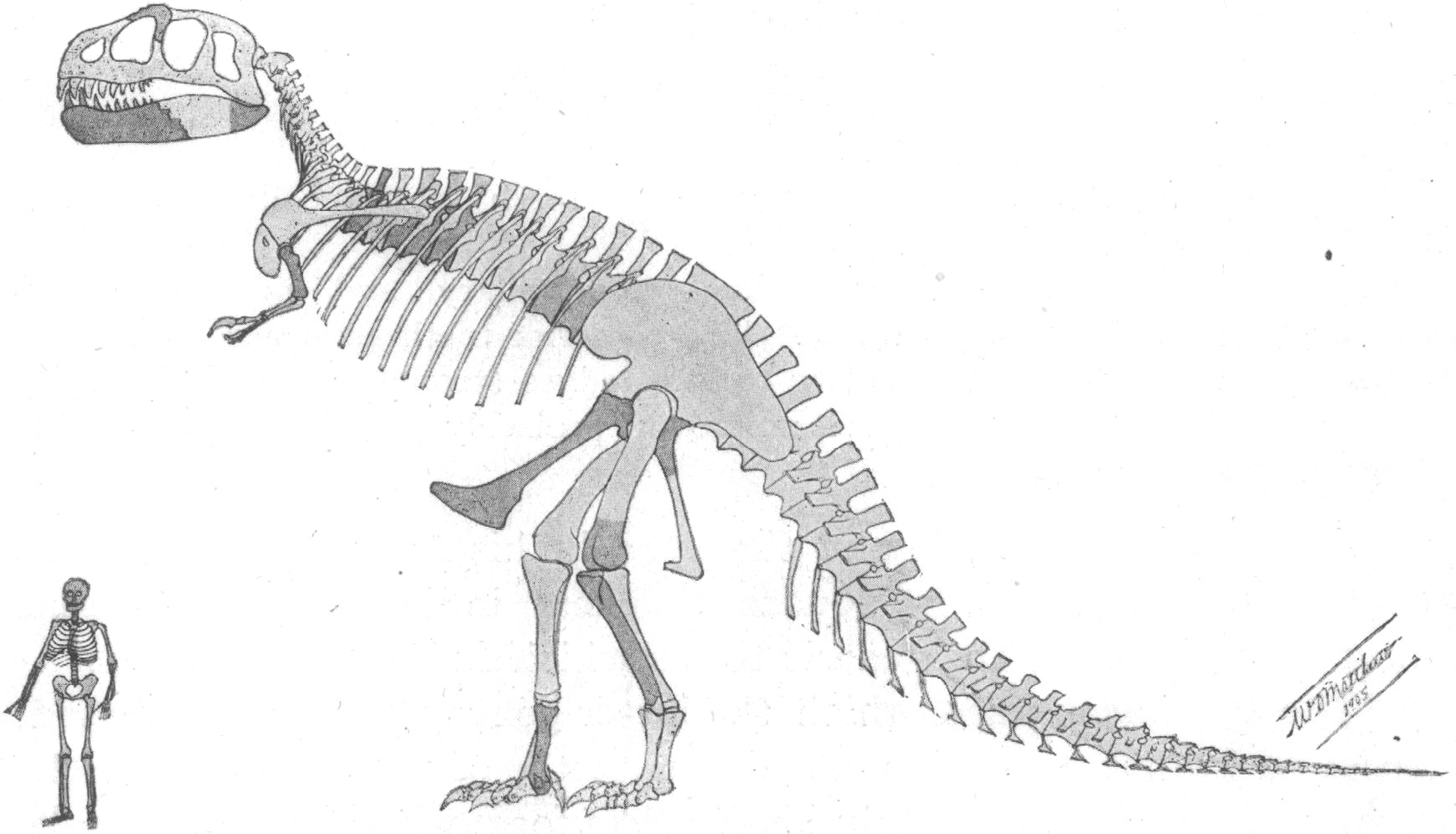
First restoration of a Tyrannosaurus (holotype CM 9380) skeleton ever published 1905

I propose to make this animal the type of the new genus, Tyrannosaurus, in reference to its size, which far exceeds that of any carnivorous land animal hitherto described...This animal is in fact the ne plus ultra of the evolution of the large carnivorous dinosaurs: in brief it is entitled to the royal and high sounding group name which I have applied to it.

Paleontologist Mark P. Witton attributes the dinosaur's popularity in part to its name. "It's hard to argue that Tyrannosaurs rex is not one of the most arresting and memorable scientific names ever applied to an animal living or extinct". He argues that Henry Farifield Osborn created the popular image of the dinosaur stating that while Spinosaurus was known as early as 1912 and Carcharodontosaurus in 1914, neither made much impact at the time due in part to Osborn's American Museum of Natural History presenting T. rex as the sole giant theropod. He also states that,

"The narrative established around T. rex was in many respects a dinosaurian reflection of Western values in the early twentieth century. Western nation viewed themselves as the end-product and pinnacle of mammalian evolution as well as masters of the natural world and less-wealthy countries. In much the same way, Tyrannosaurus was the final form and master of dinosaurian development. But, in alignment with the then-fashionable principles of orthogenetic evolution [...] Tyrannosaurus was a dark, savage imitation of humanity.

Thus named, Tyrannosaurus gained widespread public attention on December 30, 1905, when the New York Times hailed T. rex as "the most formidable fighting animal of which there is any record whatever," the "king of all kings in the domain of animal life," "the absolute warlord of the earth," and a "royal man-eater of the jungle." In 1906, Tyrannosaurus was dubbed the "prize fighter of antiquity" and the "Last of the Great Reptiles and the King of Them All."

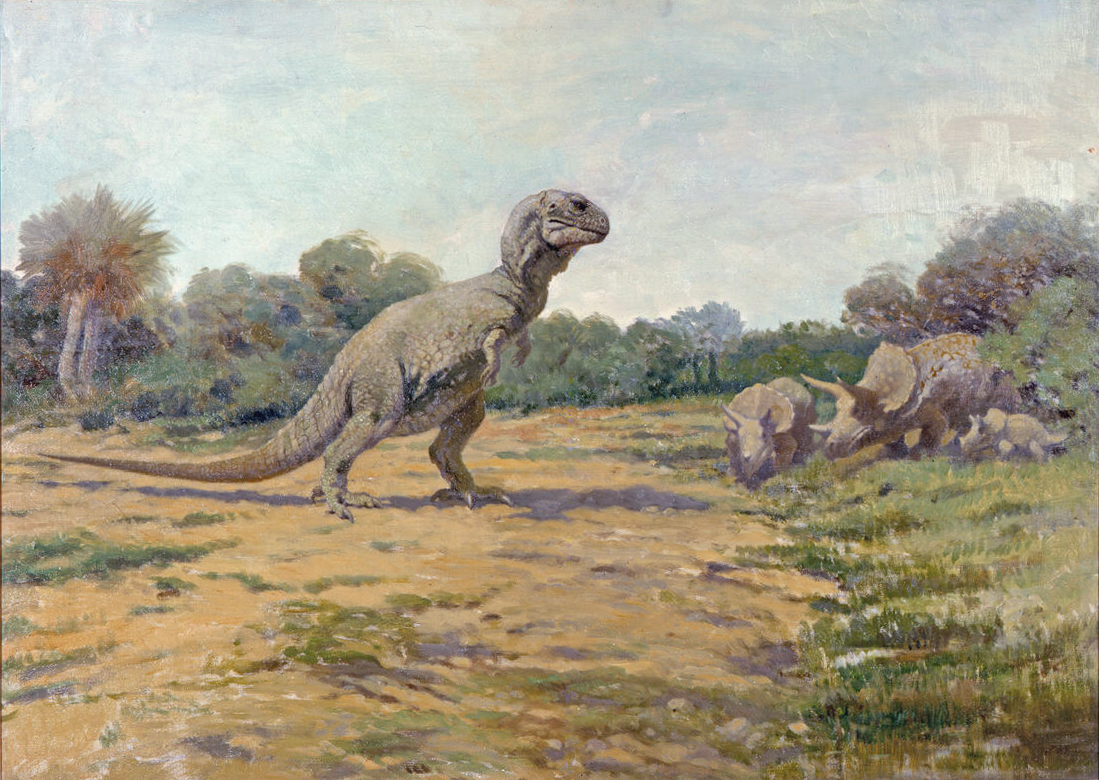
Tyrannosaurus confronts a family of Triceratops. Charles R. Knight painting for the American Museum of Natural History in 1919, before his famous mural at the Field Museum

In 1927, Charles R. Knight painted a mural incorporating Tyrannosaurus facing a Triceratops in the Field Museum of Natural History, establishing the two dinosaurs as enemies in popular thought; paleontologist Phil Currie cites this mural as one of his inspirations to study dinosaurs. Bakker said of the imagined rivalry between Tyrannosaurus and Triceratops, "No matchup between predator and prey has ever been more dramatic. It's somehow fitting that those two massive antagonists lived out their co-evolutionary belligerence through the very last days of the very last epoch of the Age of Dinosaurs."

Since then, popular culture has consistently depicted Tyrannosaurus as "King of the Dinosaurs," analogous to the lion's depiction as "King of Beasts." Some paleontologists critique the "garish caricatures [...] based on influential film depictions and stereotypes about dinosaur appearance rather than on fossil data." " Other, such as paleontologist and museum curator Mark Norell, Tyrannosaurus rex "continues to be a subject of fascination, a popular icon, and probably the first dinosaur name imprinted in the minds of children globally. Besides all this, it is the inspiration for budding paleontologists worldwide."

== Film appearances ==
Segment of the 1925 film The Lost World, featuring Agathaumas, Tyrannosaurus and Pteranodon

Tyrannosaurus rex has played a major role in many films, starting in 1918 with The Ghost of Slumber Mountain, written and directed by stop motion special effects pioneer Willis O'Brien. The Ghost of Slumber Mountain is also most likely the first film to show Tyrannosaurus facing Triceratops.

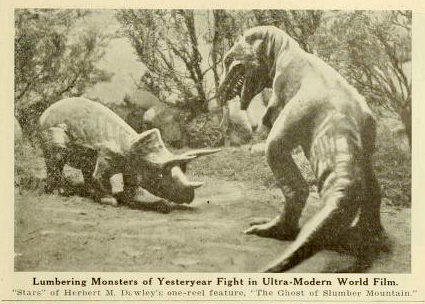
Stop-motion Tyrannosaurus and Triceratops from The Ghost of Slumber Mountain (1918)

Ghost was the first of O'Brien's works to feature the dinosaur; he next used it in 1925, with the classic adaptation of Arthur Conan Doyle's 1912 novel The Lost World. Tyrannosaurus fossils were not as famous at the time of the novel's publication (1912), and the only main villain dinosaur in the book was Allosaurus, with no appearance of Tyrannosaurus. However, the 1925 film featured Tyrannosaurus anyway, for a more dramatic and spectacular effect. For his part, Bakker commented that "Willis O'Brien was a scholarly man, anatomically literate he went to the American museum, he saw the skeletons, he thought about them, he saw Knight's paintings and the sculptures. He listened to Osborn's ideas and although T. rex has a bit part in the movie, T. rex influence is huge."

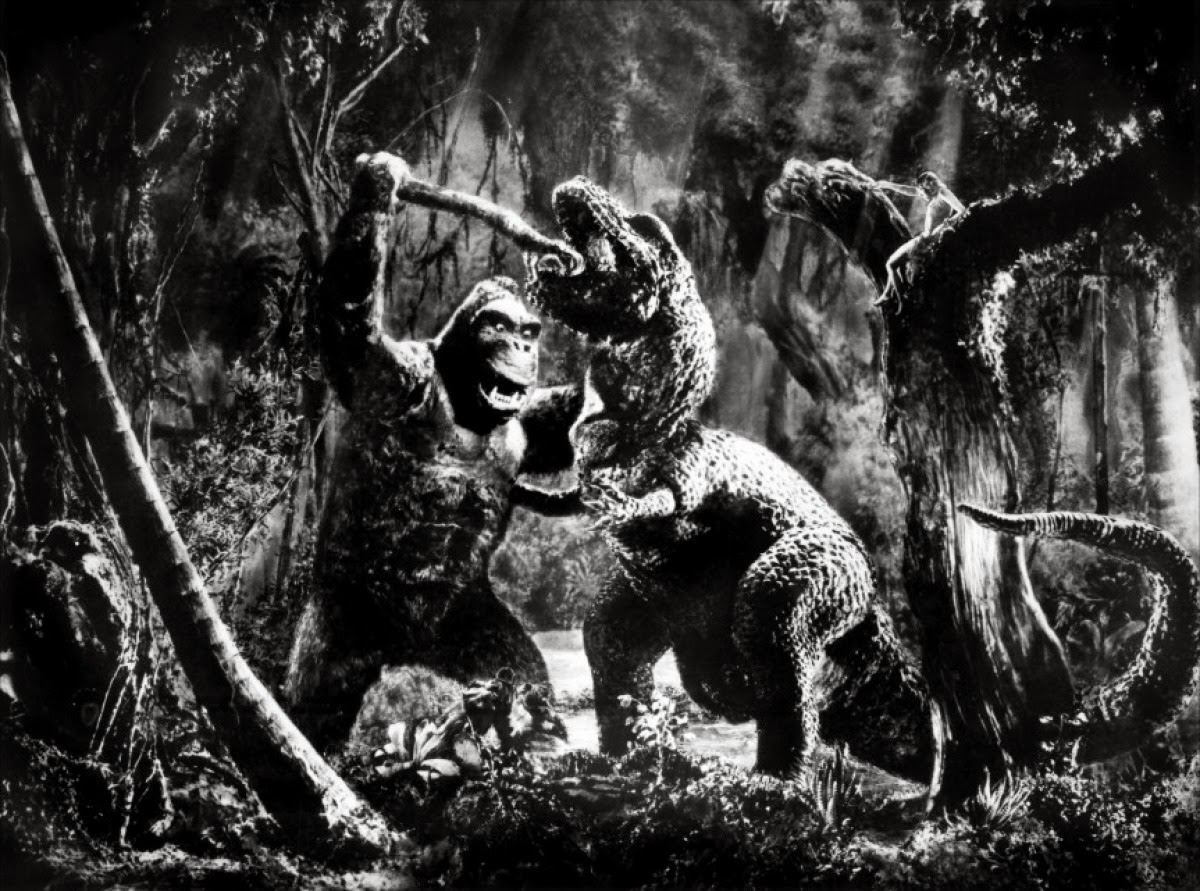
Promotional photo of a Tyrannosaurus battling King Kong (1933)

O'Brien was again responsible for special effects in the 1933 monster film King Kong, which featured a climactic battle between the titular giant ape and a Tyrannosaurus. This scene is credited with the film's success both in terms of cinematic experience and in securing financial backing. In a 2005 tongue in cheek mockumentary, "T. Rex: A Dinosaur in Hollywood," Kong himself explained that "Well, I had to find a suitably impressive monster to showoff my great strength and ruthlessness. There was only one real choice!"

In real life, film historian and Kong scholar Ray Morton agreed with the previous statement. According to Morton, the film studio RKO wanted to halt production on King Kong on account of it going over budget. Merian C Cooper, Kong's creator, then showed the studio heads a 20-minute test reel he and his team had made. The footage was of T. Rex's fight with Kong and was the scene that convinced the studio heads that the film had to be made, regardless of costs.

O'Brien had not originally meant to create Kong, instead seeking to make a film about a lost island of dinosaurs wherein the T. rex would have featured in the climax. When this film, Creation, was cancelled, O'Brien reused the T. rex model he had made, along with other dinosaur models, for King Kong. The Tyrannosaurus model was made using a cast based on an early painting by Charles R. Knight. O'Brien stated that the battle between Kong and the Tyrannosaurus was one of the most technically difficult scenes in the film to animate. Many early films depicted Tyrannosaurus with an upright posture based on the current thinking of the time. Most of these films inaccurately portrayed the dinosaur with three prominent fingers on each hand like Allosaurus (though Tyrannosaurus had a third, vestigial finger, it would not have been noticeable at first glance); Walt Disney is reported to have informed dinosaur hunter Barnum Brown that "it looked better that way", and the creature was depicted as such as in the segment based on Igor Stravinsky's The Rite of Spring in the Walt Disney 1940 animated film Fantasia. Since then, T. rex has appeared in numerous "monster" films and educational documentaries. One of the first appearances which portrayed a proper posture and anatomy of Tyrannosaurus is the 1984 short Prehistoric Beast, fully conceived and made by Phil Tippett by means of his so-called go motion technique. In 1985, the 1984 Prehistoric Beast short was served to Robert Guenette to direct a full-length TV documentary film titled Dinosaur!, for which Phil Tippett made new Tyrannosaurus go motion sequences of it chasing Hadrosaurus in addition to those he made for Prehistoric Beast, where Tyrannosaurus was chasing Monoclonius.

One of the most iconic depictions of Tyrannosaurus in film was in 1993's Jurassic Park, in which dinosaurs and other prehistoric animals, including Tyrannosaurus, are revived using blood from fossilized mosquitoes. In the film, the dinosaur breaks free of its theme park enclosure before roaming the park, attacking visitors and killing one, a lawyer. In the film's climax, the Tyrannosaurus, also known as Rexy by fans, indirectly saves the main characters by killing Velociraptors that have been hunting them through the visitor center. The popularity of T. rex long had a reciprocal effect on dinosaur science; the popularity of Jurassic Park factored into the discovery of the dinosaur genus Scipionyx; fossils of the genus had lain in storage in a basement in Italy until the film's release attracted attention from the fossil owner. A Tyrannosaurus family with two adults and a baby appear in the film sequel The Lost World: Jurassic Park, and in a minor role in Jurassic Park III, where a Tyrannosaurus fights and is killed by the Spinosaurus. The Tyrannosaurus from the first film returns in Jurassic World (2015), making an entrance by smashing through a Spinosaurus skeleton. In the climax, it defeats the Indominus rex with help from Blue the Velociraptor and the Mosasaurus. This particular Tyrannosaurus returns in Jurassic World: Fallen Kingdom and Jurassic World: Dominion. A new Tyrannosaurus, nicknamed "Ember", appears in Jurassic World Rebirth.

Tyrannosaurus is one of the three dinosaur types whose physical characteristics were combined by the designers at Toho to create the Japanese monster Godzilla; the other two dinosaurs were Stegosaurus and Iguanodon.

Tyrannosaurus has made major appearances in many other films, including Dinosaurus! (1960), The Last Dinosaur (1977), The Land Before Time and its direct-to-video sequels (1988–2016), We're Back! A Dinosaur's Story (1993), Toy Story (1995), Night at the Museum (2006), Meet the Robinsons (2007), Ice Age: Dawn of the Dinosaurs (2009), The Good Dinosaur (2015), and The Super Mario Galaxy Movie (2026). The IMAX 3D film T-Rex: Back to the Cretaceous (1998) featured a Tyrannosaurus in various time travel sequences, as well as its discoverer, Barnum Brown.

Some Japanese animated films have a Tyrannosaurus as a main protagonist (You Are Umasou, 2010), as the main villain (Daikyouryu no Jidai, The Age of the Great Dinosaurs, 1979), as a minor antagonist (Magic Tree House, 2011), or as a neutral character (Doraemon: Nobita's Dinosaur, 1980, as well as its 2006 remake).

Dinosaur Island (2014) features a feathered Tyrannosaurus, reflecting a more modern understanding of the dinosaurs' appearance.

Sonic the Hedgehog (2020) has a brief appearance of a virtual Tyrannosaurus that Dr. Ivo Robotnik pretends to be chased by.

== Television appearances ==
Tyrannosaurus has starred in several television and documentary series, including children's programs, both in those intended as fiction, and, more recently, documentaries.

In the American children's show Barney & Friends, Barney is a stylized Tyrannosaurus rex. In the Australian children's show The Wiggles, the character "Dorothy the Dinosaur" is a stylized adaptation of a Tyrannosaurus. Some Tyrannosaurus characters appear in Dinosaur Train, most prominently Buddy.

Tyrannosaurus was one of several dinosaurs featured in the 1974 Doctor Who serial Invasion of the Dinosaurs, starring Jon Pertwee. A sleeping juvenile is also seen on the Silurian ark in "Dinosaurs on a Spaceship". A time-travelled Tyrannosaurus is seen in London in "Deep Breath".

In the 1985 animated series The Transformers, the character Grimlock transforms into a mechanical Tyrannosaurus. In the sequel series Beast Wars, the antagonist Megatron transforms into a purple techno-organic Tyrannosaurus.

In the animated series The Terrible Thunderlizards, 'Mr. T' plays a Tyrannosaurus rex called Mr. T-rex. General Galapagos, the boss of the Thunderlizards, is also a Tyrannosaurus.

The T-rex plays recurring supporting roles in Dinosaurs (Roy Hess, Earl Sinclair's closest friend and the Sinclairs' neighbor), Dinosaucers (Genghis Rex, who is the leader of the Evil Tyrannos), Extreme Dinosaurs (T-Bone, the leader of the heroic group of the same namesake), and the anime television series Dinozaurs (as "Dino Tyranno" and his short-lived evil counterpart "Drago Tyran").

In Land of the Lost, a Tyrannosaurus rex played the villain in both the 1974 series (as "Grumpy") and the 1991 version (as "Scarface", who had a scar covering his right eye).

In the Ben 10 episode "Washington B.C.", Dr. Animo resurrects a Tyrannosaurus using its skeleton.

In Dino-Riders, the main villain Lord Krulos uses a Tyrannosaurus as his mount.

In the Japanese TV series Dinosaur War Izenborg, a Tyrannosaurus named Ururu (renamed "Tyrannus" in the US re-edit Attack of the Super Monsters) served as the main villain for the first half of the series.

A Tyrannosaurus named Tyrannor was the main antagonist of Dink the Little Dinosaur.

An anthropomorphic Tyrannosaurus named Johnny T. Rex is one of the villains in the Disney Afternoon series Darkwing Duck.

Documentaries and quasi-documentaries featuring Tyrannosaurus have included Dino Dan, Dinosaur Planet, Prehistoric Park, T. Rex: New Science, New Beast, The Truth About Killer Dinosaurs, Walking with Dinosaurs, When Dinosaurs Roamed America, Sea Monsters - A Walking with Dinosaurs Trilogy, Valley of the T-Rex, Dinosaurs Decoded, Bizarre Dinosaurs, Giant Monsters, Animal Armageddon, Jurassic Fight Club, Dinolab, T-rex: Warrior or Wimp?, T. Rex: A Dinosaur in Hollywood, Dinosaur Revolution, Prehistoric Planet, Life on Our Planet, The Dinosaurs, The Last Dragon, and Planet Dinosaur, in which it appears as a database skeleton image.

Chomper from The Land Before Time series, as well as Red Claw from the TV series and Sharptooth from the original film, are all tyrannosaurs.

Tyrannosaurus-themed mecha have appeared in the Super Sentai series beginning with Kyoryu Sentai Zyuranger and Shogozyu Tyrannosaurus, V-Rex of Mirai Sentai Timeranger, Bakuryu Tyranno of Bakuryuu Sentai Abaranger, Gozyu Rex of Kaizoku Sentai Gokaiger, Gabutyra of Zyuden Sentai Kyoryuger, and Tyramigo of Kishiryu Sentai Ryusoulger. They also appear in their respective Power Rangers adaptations, specifically in the first season of Mighty Morphin Power Rangers, Power Rangers Time Force, Power Rangers Dino Thunder, Power Rangers Super Megaforce, Power Rangers Dino Charge and Power Rangers Dino Fury. The 50th Sentai series, No.1 Sentai Gozyuger, features GozyuTyranno, who has a Tyrannosaurus motif.

In the 2011–2019 Cartoon Network animated series The Amazing World of Gumball, an animated Tyrannosaurus rex named Tina Rex is a bully at Gumball's school.

In Genndy Tartakovsky's Primal, a female Tyrannosaurus named Fang develops a bond with a Neanderthal male named Spear. The series revolves around them struggling to survive in a prehistoric-like world.

In the anime Dinosaur King, the main Tyrannosaurus is named Terry.

A Tyrannosaurus serves as an antagonist in the Phineas and Ferb episode "It's About Time!".

In the anime series Wonderful Pretty Cure!, a Tyrannosaurus rex appears in the 44th episode as an inhabitant of Niko Garden who was corrupted and transformed into a Gaogaon by Torame.

== Literature ==
In the 1952 Ray Bradbury short story A Sound of Thunder, a hunter named Eckels pays a commercial time machine company to travel back in time and hunt a Tyrannosaurus rex. However, he panics and runs when he sees the dinosaur, stepping off a special path designed to protect future history. Upon returning to the present, he discovers that he inadvertently changed history for the worse by stepping on a butterfly. The time safari guide then shoots him because of his blunder.

In literature, a dominant representation of Tyrannosaurus since 1990 has been that of Michael Crichton's, as seen in the novel Jurassic Park and its sequel The Lost World (homage title to the 1912 novel by Arthur Conan Doyle, about scientists discovering a South American plateau where dinosaurs still exist). Its skeleton was also used to illustrate the books' covers.

A Tyrannosaurus rex was the protagonist of the children's book We're Back! A Dinosaur's Story, later adapted into a feature-length film of the same name. Tyrannosaurus has also been featured in the novel Primeval: Extinction Event, by Dan Abnett.

== Other appearances ==
Tyrannosaurus has appeared in many media and is one of, if not the most, widely used dinosaurs. Various incarnations and creatures based on T. rex have appeared in video games, and several game series have featured Tyrannosaurus as a centerpiece. These include 3D Monster Maze, the Dino Crisis/Dino Stalker line, various Jurassic Park tie-in games, the Turok game series, Tomb Raider, the Zoo Tycoon series, the survival game Ark: Survival Evolved, the simulation games Saurian and The Isle, and Super Mario Odyssey.

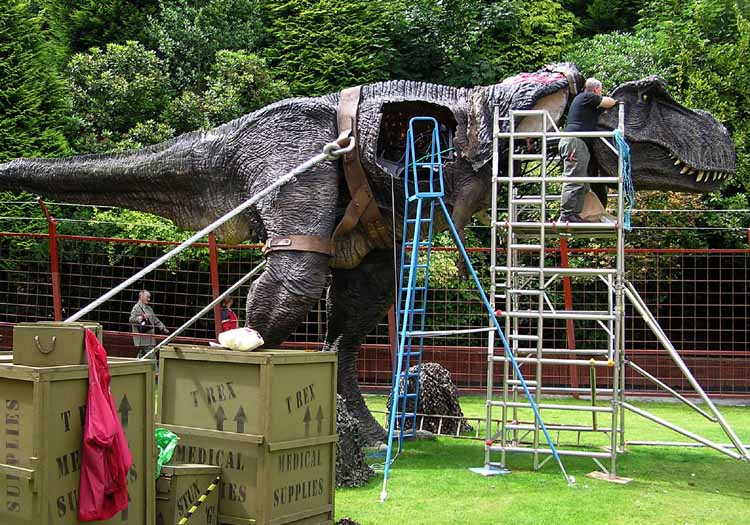
Full size animatronic Tyrannosaurus being assembled in Combe Martin Wildlife and Dinosaur Park, North Devon, United Kingdom.

Numerous models and children's toys depicting Tyrannosaurus have been produced, particularly in promotion of the Jurassic Park films. The Carnegie Museum Dinosaur Collection toy line released three versions of the dinosaur, with the second brought in line with more modern scientific understanding. Sinclair Oil ads from the 1950s frequently featured T. rex, and products from radio-controlled helicopter models to a rifle cartridge, such as the .577 T-Rex, have been named after the dinosaur. In music, the popular 1970s glam rock band T. Rex took their name from the famous dinosaur.

In Banjo-Tooie, Humba Wumba turns Banjo and Kazooie into a T. rex for two different growth stages in the world Terrydactyland.

In the F-Zero series of video games, F-Zero racer Bio Rex is a Tyrannosaurus whose machine is the Big Fang.

In the Calvin and Hobbes comics, fantasy sequences often featured Tyrannosaurus rex. In one story arc, in which Calvin writes a school paper on the T. rex predator/scavenger debate, he argues that T. rex was a predator because "They're so much cooler that way." T. rex is also featured as the protagonist in the long-running webcomic Dinosaur Comics by Ryan North. Various T. rex have featured in stories published in the British comic 2000AD.

Ursula Dubosarsky's picture book, simply called Rex and illustrated by David Mackintosh, concerns a pet lizard that assumes the proportions of a T. rex in the imagination of a series of children.

In Pokémon Gold and Silver, the Pokémon Tyranitar is named after the Tyrannosaurus, while its design resembles Godzilla, which was inspired by T. rex. In Pokémon X and Y, there is an evolution family consisting of Tyrunt and Tyrantrum, both of which are based on Tyrannosaurus. Their bodies are differently colored.

A Tyrannosaurus rex was the first superhero in the Marvel Comics series, possessing the power of the Star Brand.

Former WWE Chairman and CEO Vince McMahon had a T. rex skull hanging on his wall, a gift from his son-in-law Triple H. The skull is prominently visible whenever WWE programming films in his office, such as during the 2020 edition of Money in the Bank.

In the fifth edition of Dungeons & Dragons, the Tyrannosaurus rex is the most powerful creature in the "beast" category. As the polymorph spell allows the user to transform someone into a beast temporarily, including themselves or an ally, the creature appears frequently in high-level play. Screen Rant refers to the move simply as "the T-Rex strategy".

The manga Dinosaur Sanctuary features an elderly Tyrannosaurus named Hanako residing at Enoshima Dinoland as the only one of her species in the park, with her introductory chapter having the cast celebrating her 36th birthday.

Casimir, a gentle orange or green dinosaur, is the mascot of the French children's television series L'Île aux enfants, and is modelled after a T-rex.

The T-rex is featured in the 2011 documentary Dinosaur Revolution, in the fourth episode "End Game".

The Australian YouTube collective How Ridiculous features a T. rex doll it calls "Rexy" in most of its videos. The group's official website lists Rexy as a cast member.

== See also ==
- Cultural depictions of dinosaurs
  - Stegosaurus in popular culture
- Timeline of tyrannosaur research
- List of films featuring dinosaurs
