= Stegosaurus in popular culture =

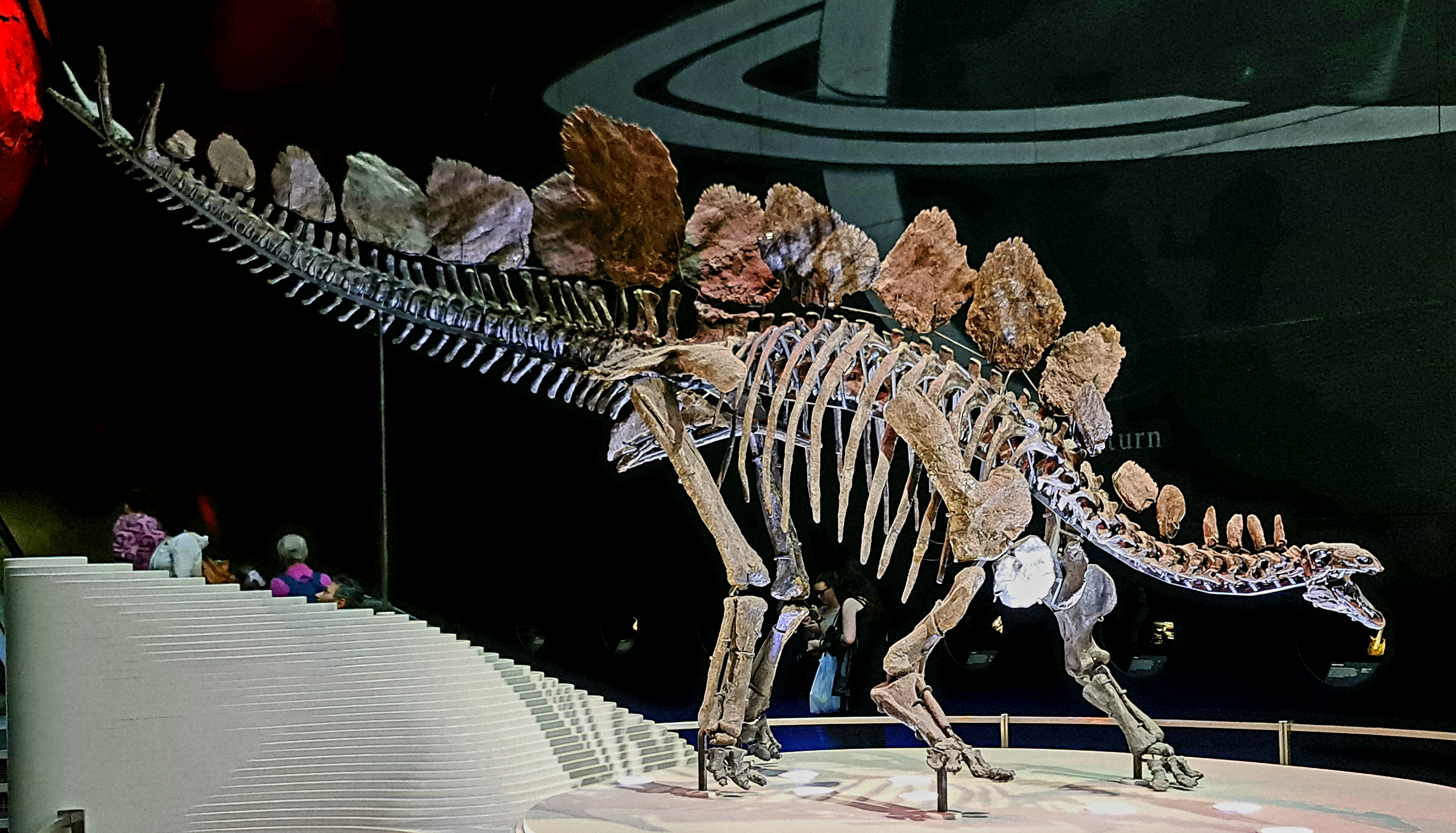
Modern mount of a Stegosaurus skeleton ("Sophie") at the Natural History Museum in London, installed in December of 2014, with an elongated neck, a straight tail, and horizontally angled tail spikes, correcting generations of Stegosaurus skeletons with short necks, drooping tails, and vertical spikes

The 19th century American paleontologist Othniel Charles Marsh had named and first described Stegosaurus in 1877, originally interpreted from incomplete fossil remains as an aquatic reptile with turtle-like armor plates that lay flat on its back. Later discoveries allowed Marsh to restore Stegosaurus more accurately as a terrestrial plant-eating dinosaur, initially restored with a single row of plates aligned vertically along its back with eight pairs of spikes on the end of its tail. By the end of the 19th century, Stegosaurus had emerged as one of the most notable American dinosaur discoveries and had passed from the realm of scientific research into the popular imagination, sparked by its strange appearance. In 1893, the British paleontologist Richard Lydekker had reacted with astonishment at Marsh's 1891 illustrations of the skeletons of Stegosaurus and Triceratops: "Prof. Marsh published restorations of two forms, which for strangeness and uncouthness exceed the wildest flights of the imagination."

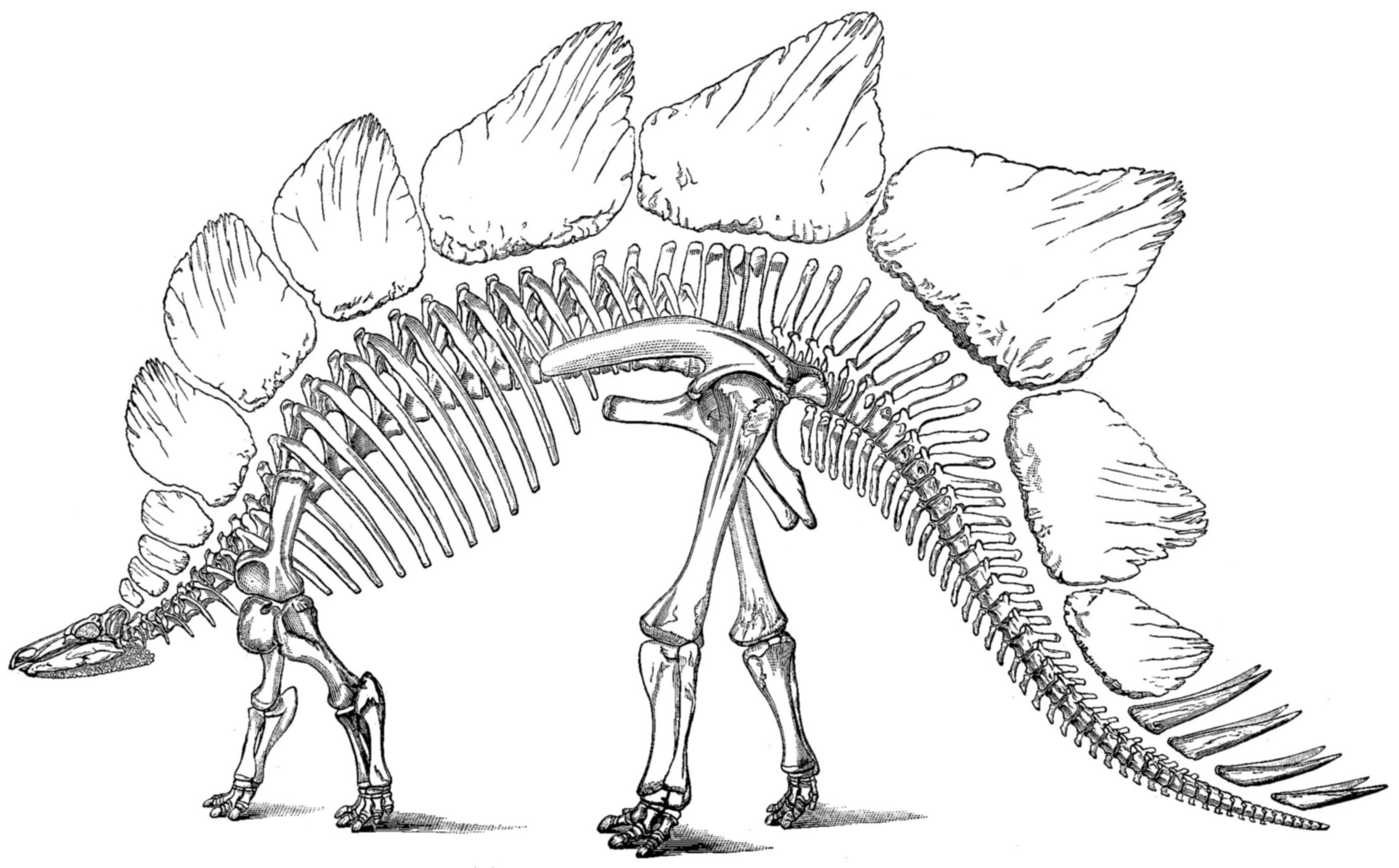
Marsh's 1891 illustration of Stegosaurus ungulatus. Note the single row of 12 large rounded plates, based on those of S. stenops, and eight spikes

Stegosaurus would become one of the most recognizable of all dinosaurs, appearing early on in popular books and articles about prehistoric animals, and, starting in the first decades of the 20th century, taking a prominent place among the mounted dinosaur skeletons featured in major museums. Stegosaurus has been depicted on film, in cartoons and comics, and as children's toys.

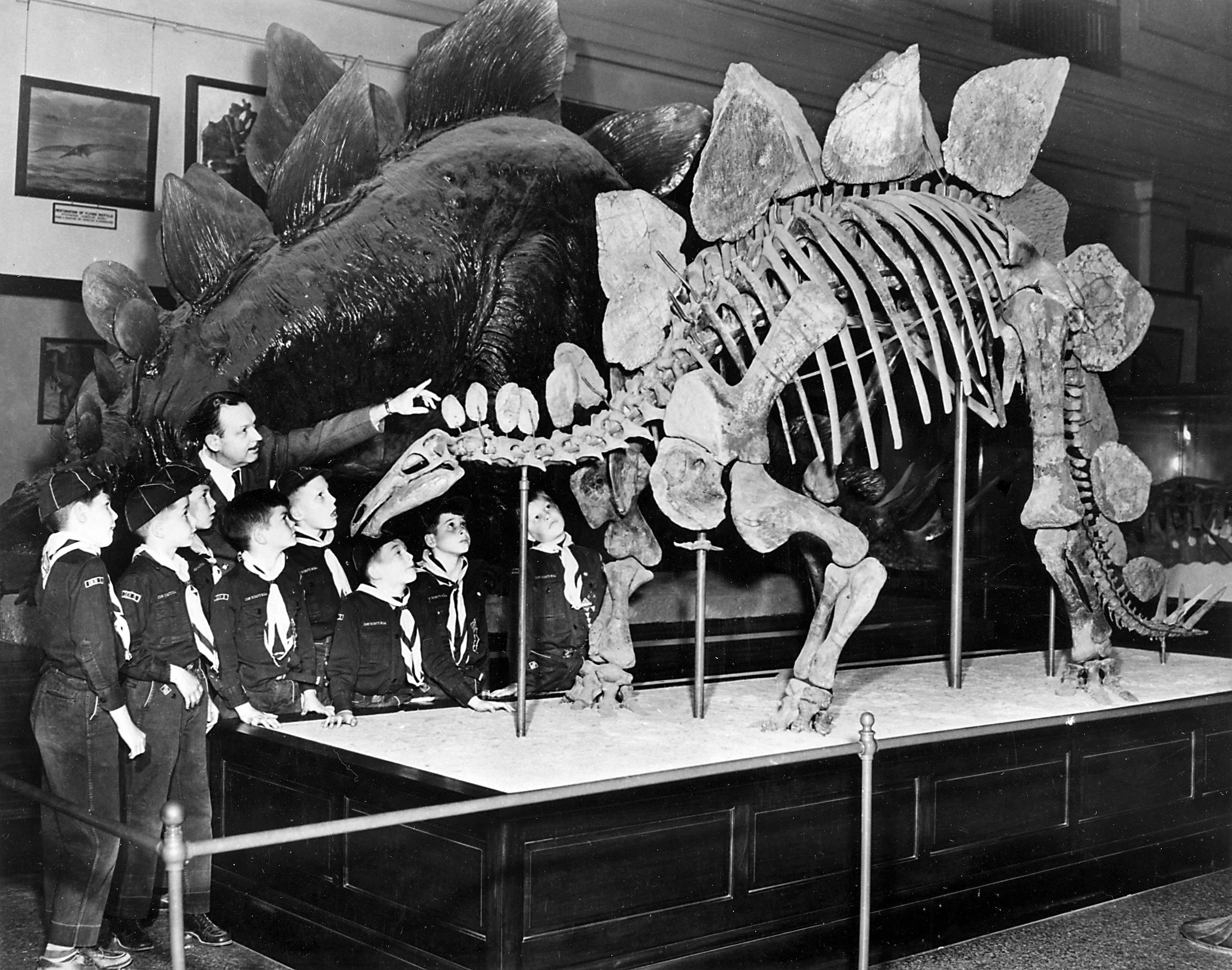
Cub Scouts view the Stegosaurus at the Smithsonian Museum of Natural History during the 1950s

Among its claims to fame, Stegosaurus was made the official state fossil for Colorado on April 28, 1982, after a two-year campaign begun by a class of 4th graders and their teacher Ruth Sawdo at McElwain Elementary School in Thornton, Colorado. The first fossils of Stegosaurus were discovered in Colorado in 1877, a year after the state entered the Union (1876).

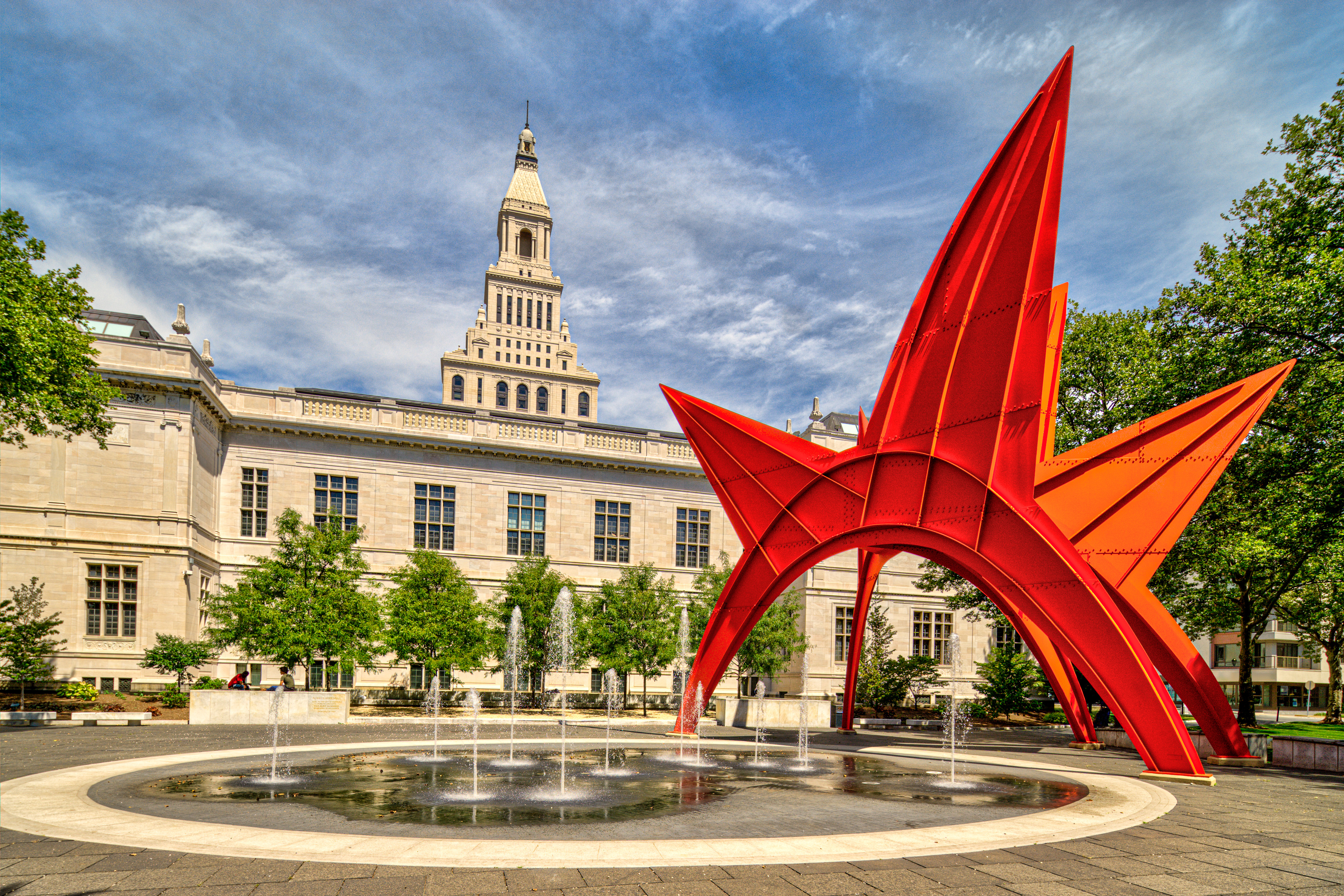
Alexander Calder’s steel sculpture “Stegosaurus” in Hartford, Connecticut, installed in 1973

The famous 20th century American sculptor Alexander Calder designed a 50-foot-tall by 32-foot-wide abstract metal sculpture in 1972 known as "Stegosaurus". Fabricated by the Segre Iron Works and constructed out 45 steel plates bolted together, the monumental piece, painted a bright orange-red, was installed in Burr Mall in Hartford, Connecticut in 1973, placed near a fountain as if to suggest an animal approaching for a drink. The work was commissioned as a memorial to Alfred E. Burr, who founded the Hartford Times newspaper in the 19th century. The British botanist and writer Nicholas Guppy reportedly saw the planned abstract sculpture with enlarged triangular projections at an early development stage and observed that it "looked like a prehistoric monster", a comparison that inspired the name "Stegosaurus". A small-scale maquette version of the steel sculpture, measuring 13-feet-tall and 14-feet-wide, now stands outside the Toledo Museum of Art in Ohio. Also called "Stegosaurus" and painted bright orange-red, the preparatory stage work had been installed at the University of Connecticut Health Center in Farmington in 1975, but was sold at auction in 2000 for $4.1 million to the Toledo Museum of Art.

== Artistic representations ==
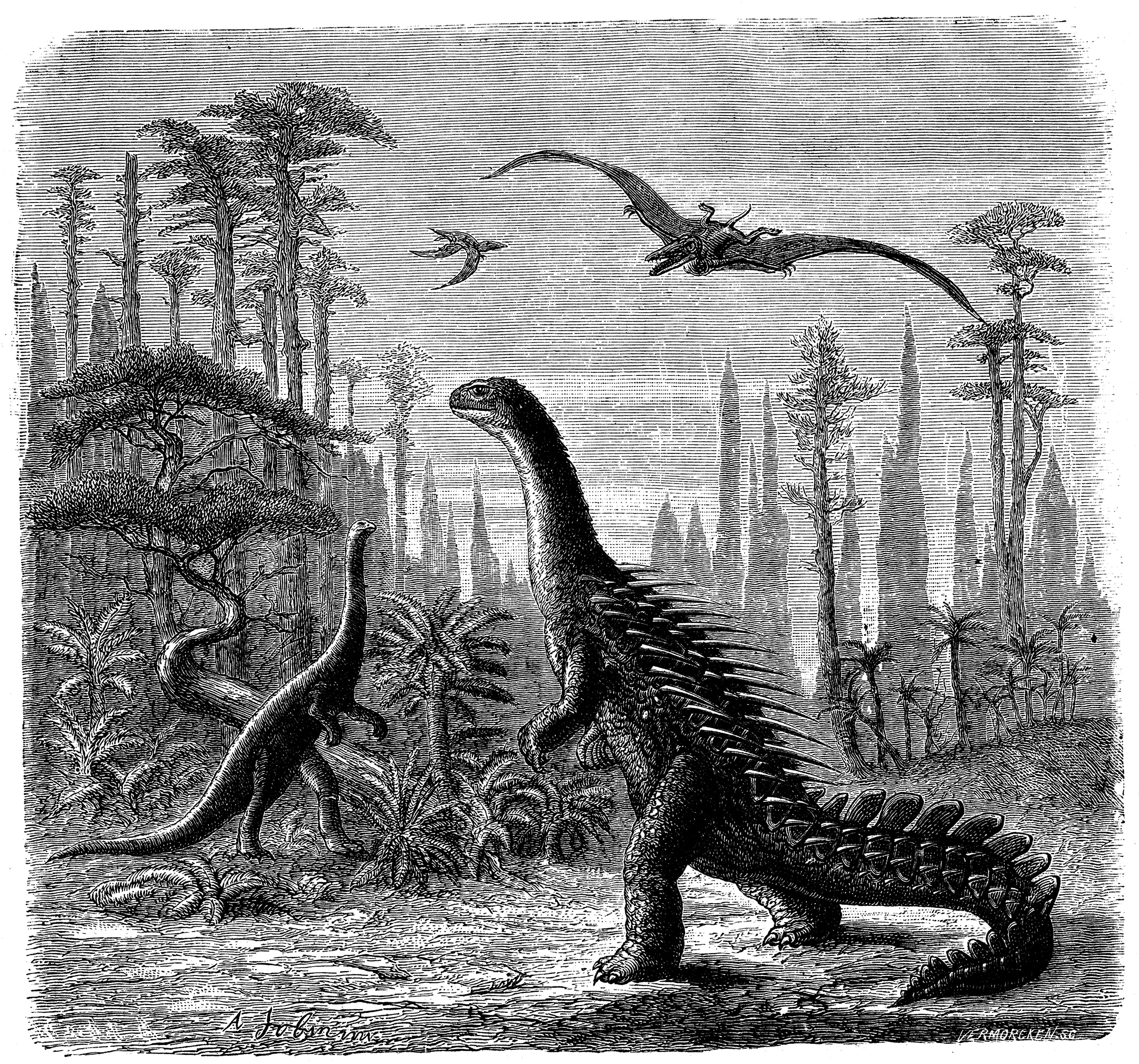
Early restoration of Stegosaurus by A. Jobin, 1884

Due to the fragmentary nature of most early Stegosaurus fossil finds, it took many years before reasonably accurate restorations of this dinosaur could be produced. The earliest popular image of Stegosaurus was an engraving produced by the French science illustrator Auguste-Michel Jobin, which appeared in the November 1884 issue of Scientific American and elsewhere, and which depicted the dinosaur amid a speculative Morrison age Jurassic landscape. Jobin restored the Stegosaurus as bipedal and long-necked, with the plates arranged along the tail and the back covered in spikes. This covering of spikes might have been based on a misinterpretation of long, cylindrical teeth in rows found with the fossils bones, distinct from the compressed teeth found in a jaw fragment, as noted by Marsh in his initial 1877 description of Stegosaurus armatus. Marsh thought the apparent cylindrical teeth might turn out to be small dermal spines, similar to those of some types of fishes. In 1884, however, he reidentified the cylindrical teeth found with the first Stegosaurus bones as those of the sauropod dinosaur Diplodocus, later given the species name Diplodocus lacustris. Work at the original fossil site in 2013 revealed that the teeth in fact came from part of an Apatosaurus skull, missed by the original 1877 excavation of the Quarry 5 site.

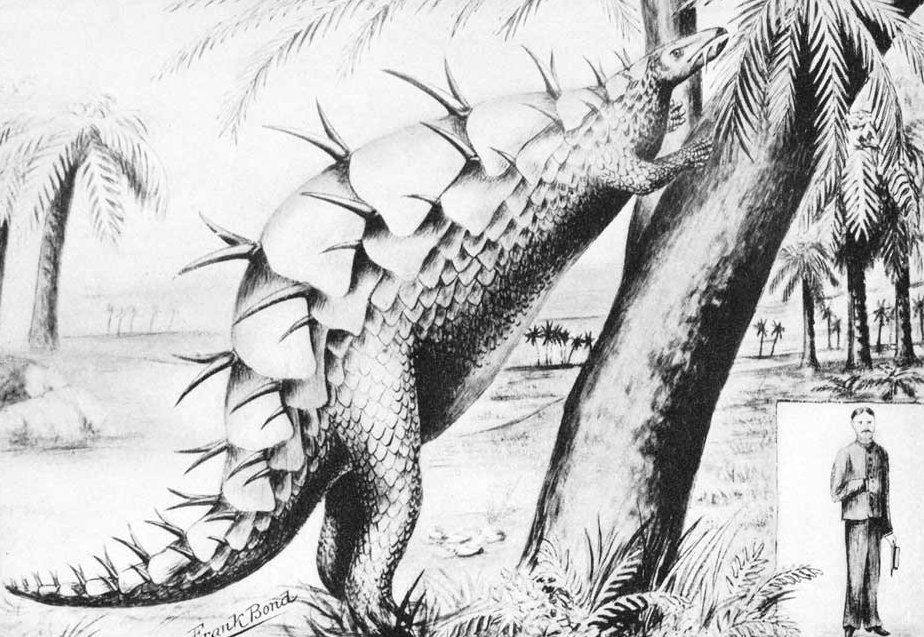
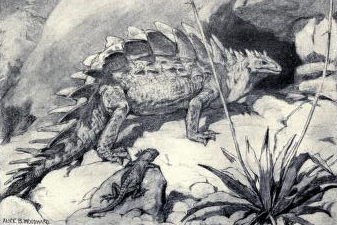
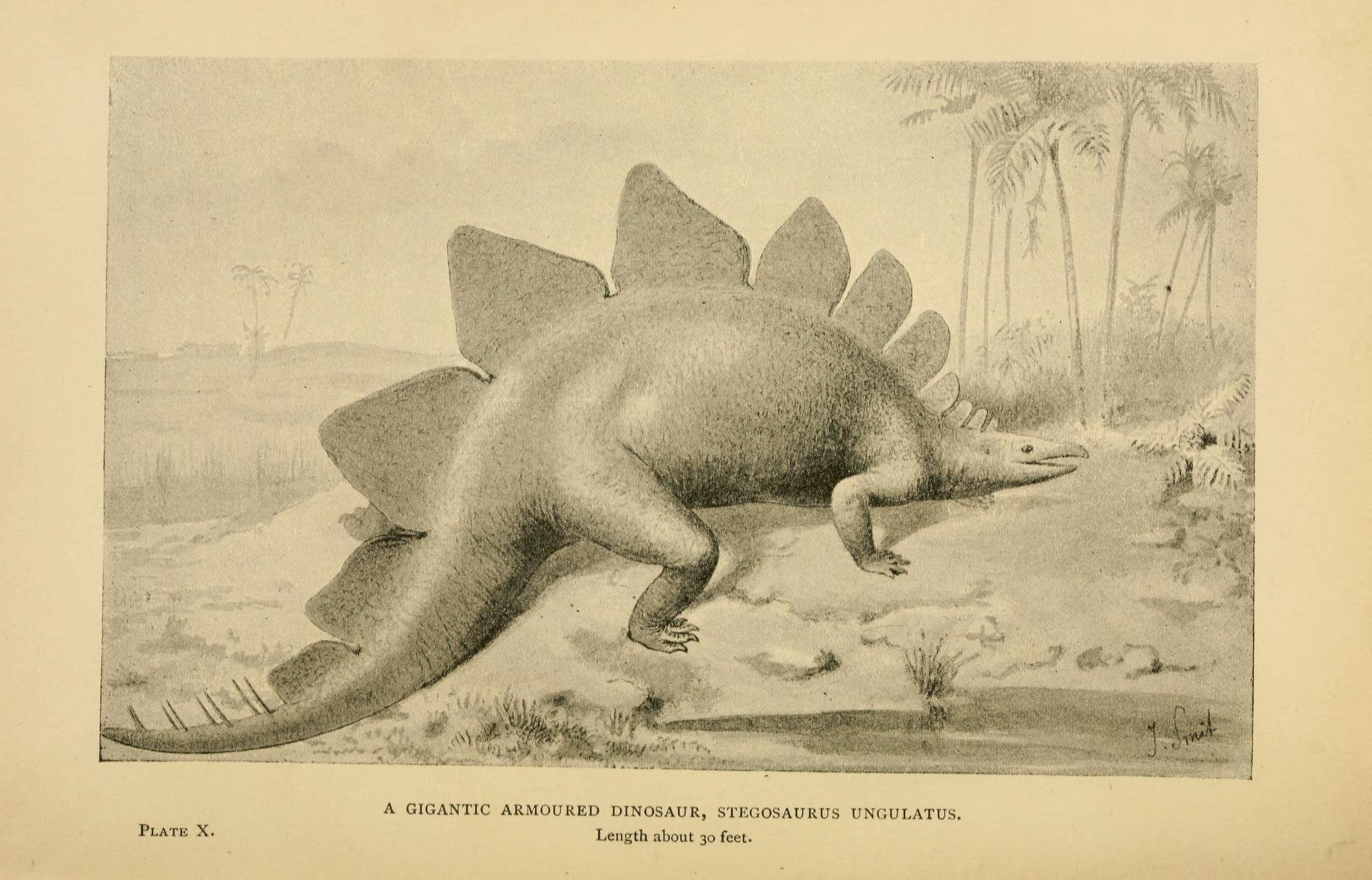
Early inaccurate reconstructions of Stegosaurus:
- top: Stegosaurus with turtle-like armor over its back, by Frank Bond (1899)
- bottom left: Stegosaurus as an armored lizard (1912)
- bottom right: Stegosaurus crawling on its belly (1896)

Marsh published his more accurate skeletal reconstruction of Stegosaurus in 1891, and within a decade Stegosaurus had become among the most-illustrated types of dinosaur. Nevertheless, scientifically inaccurate, sometimes fanciful, reconstructions of Stegosaurus appeared in different books and publications in the late 19th and early 20th centuries, some imposing a crawling lizard-like posture or creating odd arrangements of the plates and spikes.

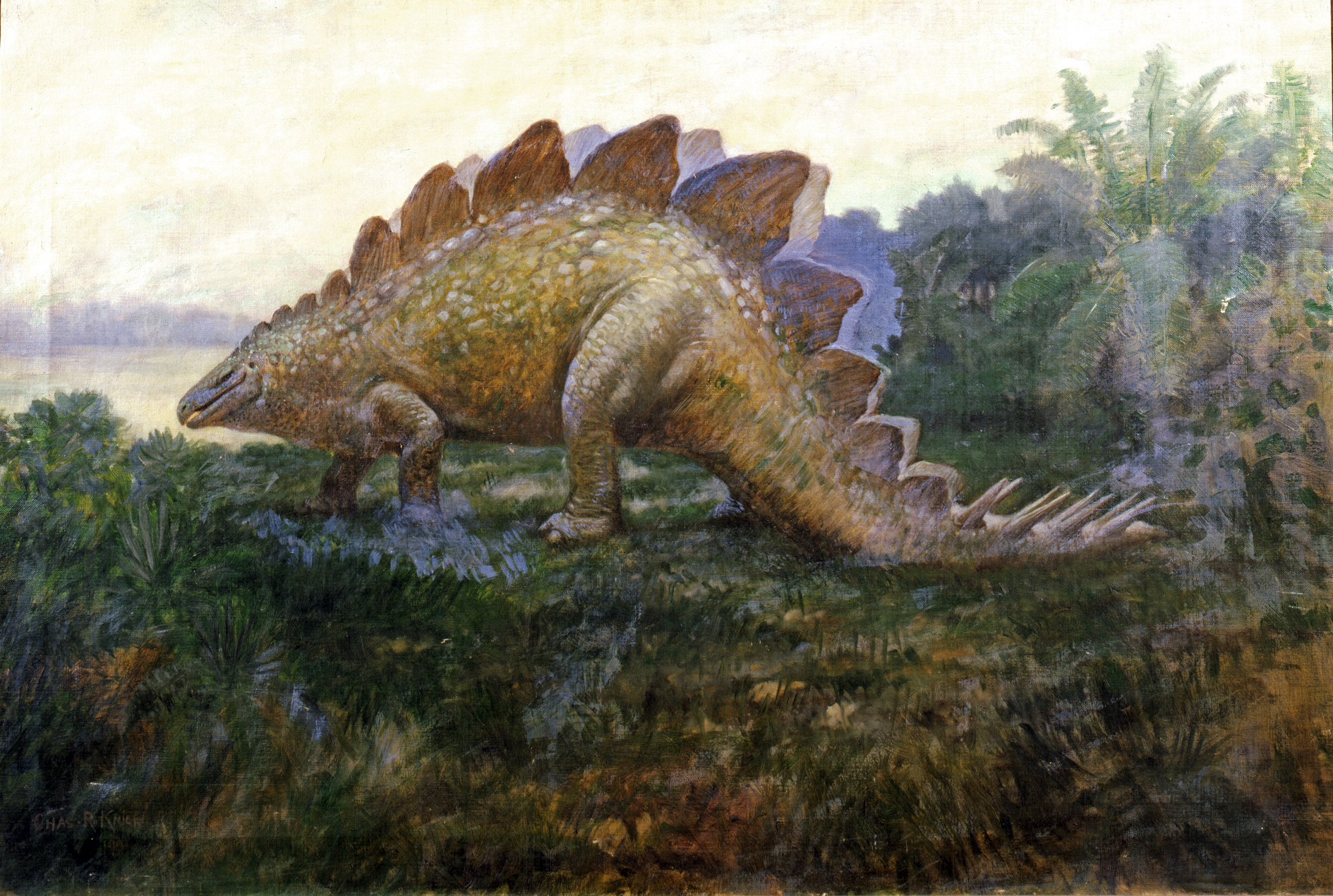
1901 life restoration of Stegosaurus ungulatus by Charles R. Knight with paired dorsal plates and eight tail spikes

The renowned artist Charles R. Knight specialized in science-based reconstructions of prehistoric animals, often developed under the direction or with the advice of paleontologists. His depictions of Stegosaurus over the decades reflected shifting scientific ideas about the dinosaur’s anatomy and appearance. Knight published his first illustrations of Stegosaurus ungulatus in 1897, both depicted with a single row of plates and eight tail spikes based on Marsh's 1891 skeletal reconstruction. The painting of Stegosaurus that appeared in the May 1897 issue of Harper's New Monthly Magazine (page 916) restored the armored dinosaur with rows of rectangular crocodile-like scutes along its upper body and horizontal scale bands on its belly. A different ink rendering of Stegosaurus published in the November 1897 issue of The Century Magazine (page 22) covered the dinosaur’s body in round, pebbly scales, more like those in some types of lizards. Knight's next used a double row for his more well-known 1901 painting, produced under the direction of the zoologist Frederic Augustus Lucas, then with the National Museum of Natural History. This illustration would later be the basis of the stop-motion Stegosaurus puppet used in the 1933 film King Kong. Again under Lucas, Knight revised his version of Stegosaurus two years later, producing a model with a staggered double row of plates. Knight would go on to paint Stegosaurus with a staggered double plate row in 1927, updated to have only four tail spikes, for the Field Museum of Natural History as part of a series of murals depicting prehistoric life.

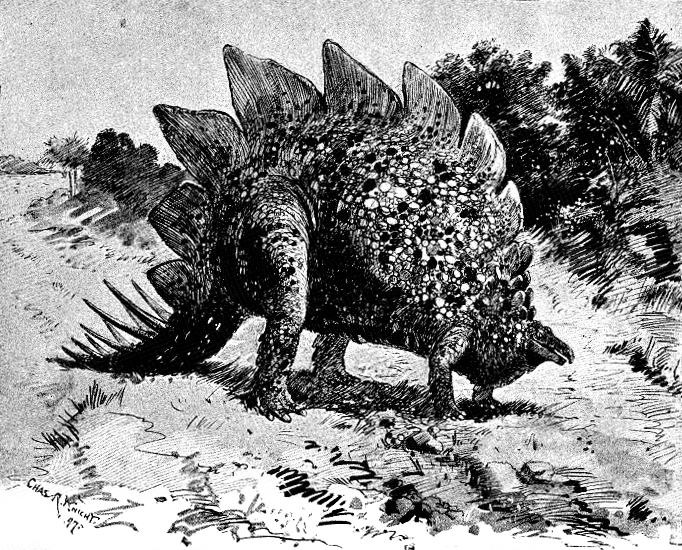
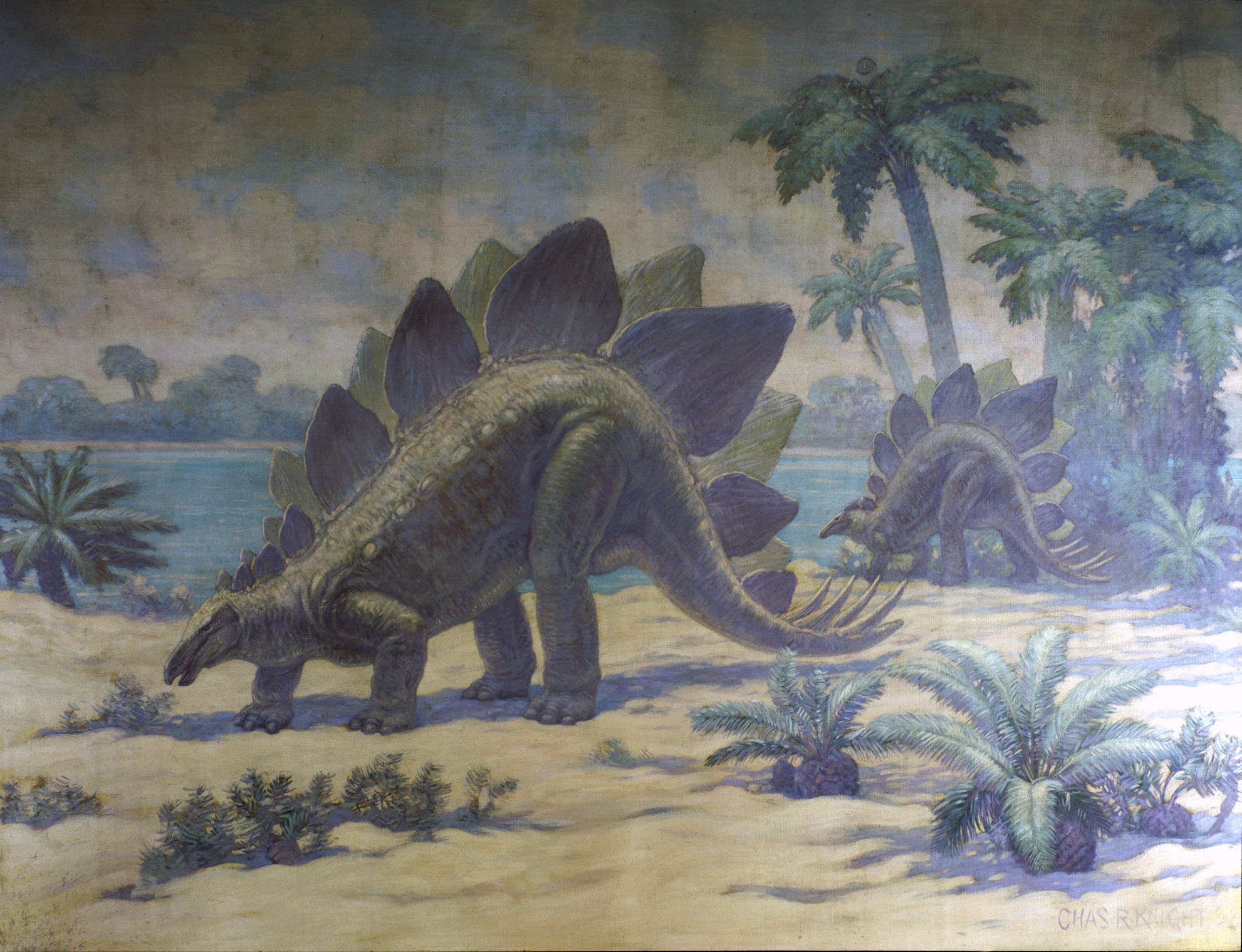
Two contrasting reconstructions of Stegosaurus by Charles R. Knight, depicted in 1897 with a single row of plates and eight tail spikes in Century Magazine (left) and updated in 1927 with a staggered double row of plates and four tail spikes for a mural at the Field Museum (right)

Two decades later, artist Rudolph F. Zallinger painted a lumbering Stegosaurus with staggered plates in his The Age of Reptiles mural at the Peabody Museum in 1947. Stegosaurus appeared on the cover of Life magazine in September 1953 based on Zallinger's mural.

== Life-size models ==
Stegosaurus made its major public debut as a paper mache model commissioned by the U.S. National Museum of Natural History for the 1904 Louisiana Purchase Exposition. The model was based on Knight's latest miniature with the double row of staggered plates, and was exhibited in the United States Government Building at the exposition in St. Louis before being relocated to Portland, Oregon for the Lewis and Clark Centennial Exposition in 1905. The model was moved to the Smithsonian National Museum of Natural History (now the Arts and Industries Building) in Washington, D.C. along with other prehistory displays, and to the current National Museum of Natural History building in 1911. Following renovations to the museum in the 2010s, the model was moved once again for display at the Museum of the Earth in Ithaca, New York. The model was given the nickname "Steggy".

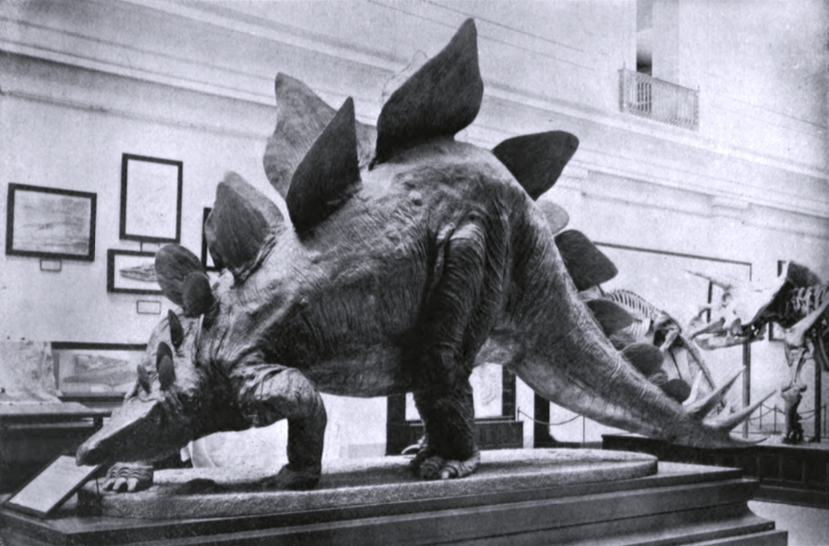
Life-sized restoration of Stegosaurus stenops in the U.S. National Museum, ca. 1911

Probably the best-known life-size models of Stegosaurus on display at museums and parks are based on a model created by sculptor Louis Paul Jonas for the Sinclair Oil Corporation as part of their Dinoland exhibit at the 1964 New York World’s Fair. The Sinclair Oil Corporation had adopted a Brontosaurus as its emblem in the early 1930s, alluding to the prehistoric source of underground petroleum (actually formed from marine microorganisms, not terrestrial dinosaurs).The tie-in inspired the company to commission life-size dinosaur models for public display and publicity. The first set of models appeared at the Chicago "Century of Progress" World's Fair in 1933 to 1934, including a Stegosaurus. A new set of updated and improved dinosaur models appeared at the 1939 New York World's Fair (1939 to 1940), again including a Stegosaurus. Sinclair Oil's most famous set of dinosaur models was created for the 1964 New York World's Fair (1964 to 1965). Louis Paul Jonas and his studio crew constructed nine life-size dinosaurs out of painted fiberglass over a supporting steel internal structure, working with paleontologists Barnum Brown, Edwin H. Colbert and John Ostrom to reflect the scientific ideas of the early 1960s (including inaccurate upright, tail-dragging postures for Tyrannosaurus and "Trachodon" [Edmontosaurus] and a wrong head for Brontosaurus). After the World's Fair ended, the dinosaur models went on a national tour and were seen by millions of Americans in 37 cities in 25 states. The original models were then donated to different public museums and parks in the United States after the Smithsonian Institution reportedly declined to take them. The original 25-foot Stegosaurus model went to Dinosaur National Monument in Utah in 1970, where it is on display outside the Quarry Visitor Center, with the original 1964 colors restored since 2016.

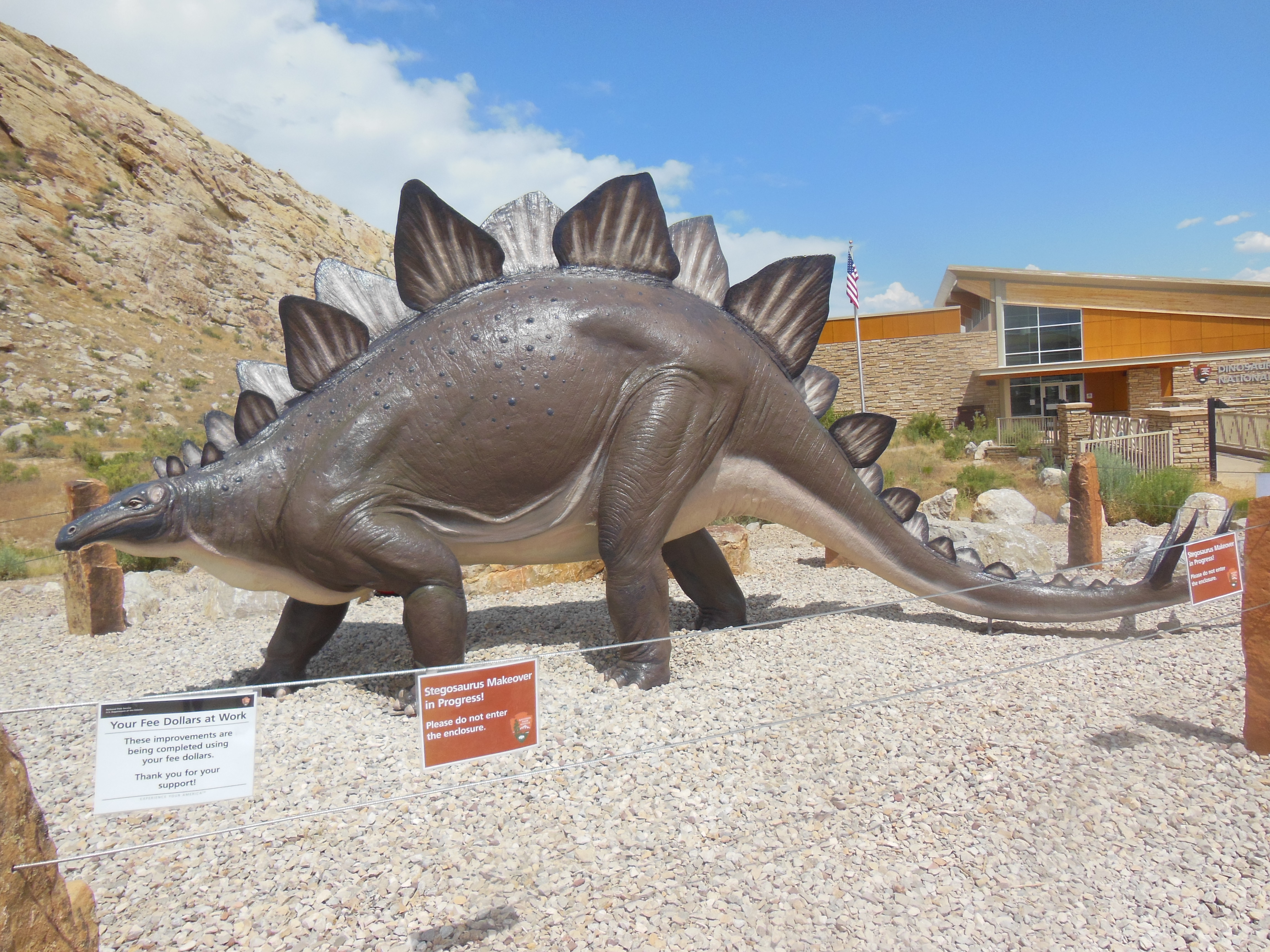
Stegosaurus model created for the 1964 World’s Fair and donated to Dinosaur National Monument in Utah in 1970, on display since 2016 with the original colors restored

The Stegosaurus model proved to be particularly popular and the Jonas Studios produced multiple copies from the original mold that were purchased by museums and other institutions. Unlike the in many ways outdated Tyrannosaurus and Brontosaurus World’s Fair models (now on display at Dinosaur Valley State Park in Texas), the Jonas Stegosaurus model still looks reasonably accurate based on modern research, apart from the drooping tail (actually held straight) and the vertical tail spikes (now thought to be angled horizontally). The replica models were given local nicknames and remain popular attractions, especially for children.

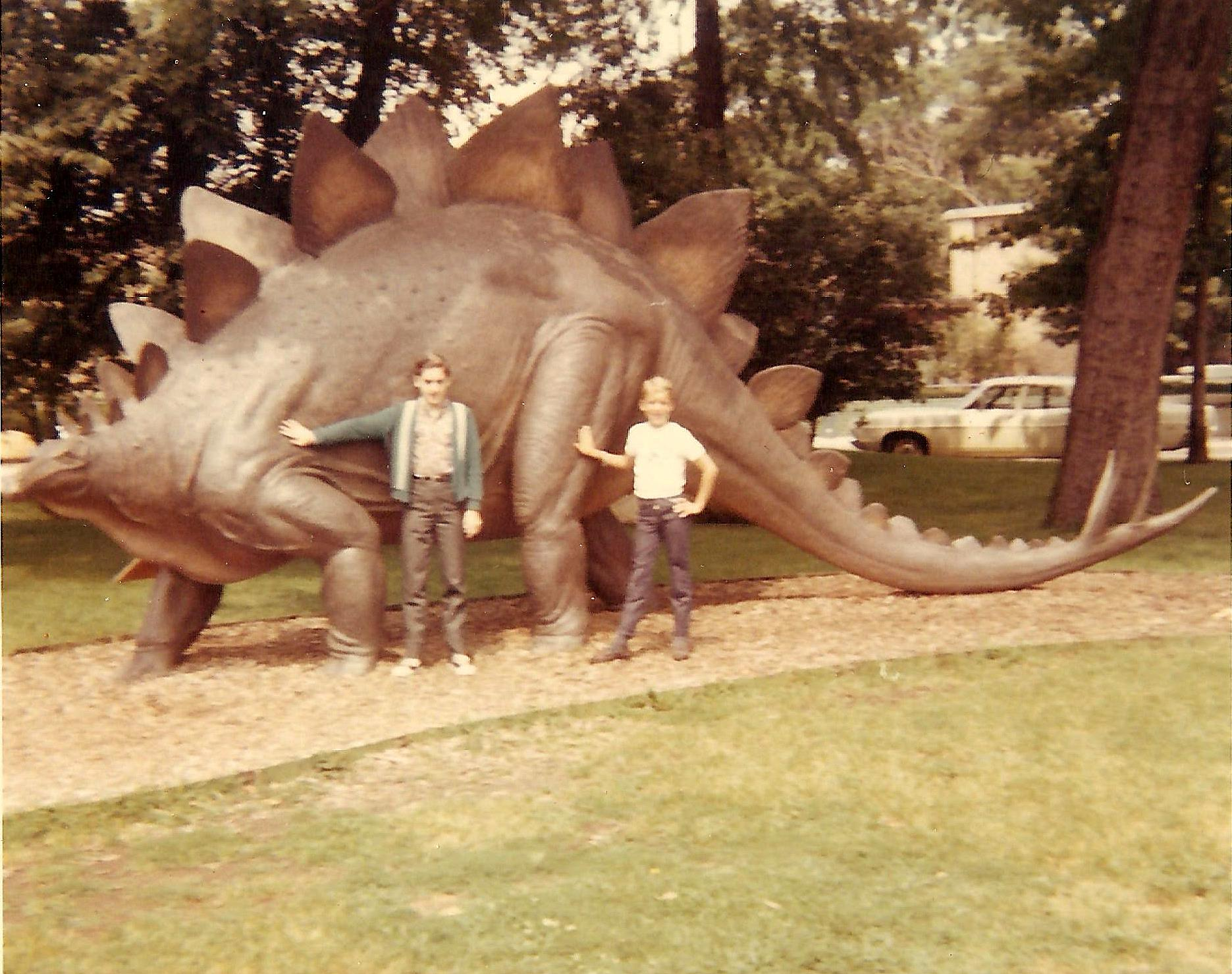
Life-size model of Stegosaurus outside the Cleveland Museum of Natural History, Ohio, summer of 1969, known as "Steggie", later replaced with "Steggie II"

Stegosaurus models on public display outside museums include "Steggie II" at the Cleveland Museum of Natural History (installed 1997), "Wally" at the Berkshire Museum in Pittsfield, Massachusetts (installed 1997 and nicknamed for its "walnut-size" brain; originally known as "Steggie" at the Cleveland Museum (installed 1968), before being gifted to the museum in Pittsfield and replaced with the new "Steggie II"), "Siegfried" or "Siggy" at the EcoTarium in Worcester, Massachusetts (installed 1964), "Steggy" at the Fernbank Museum of Natural History in Atlanta, Georgia (installed 1992), and "Steggy" at the Cranbrook Institute of Science in Bloomfield Hills, Michigan (installed in 1980 to celebrate its 50th anniversary). The Stegosaurus model at the Milwaukee Public Museum in Wisconsin is located inside as part of the Third Planet exhibit of prehistoric life that opened in 1983. Some of the models have been given different paint jobs over the years, and in some cases refurbished, repaired, and updated by the Jonas Studios.

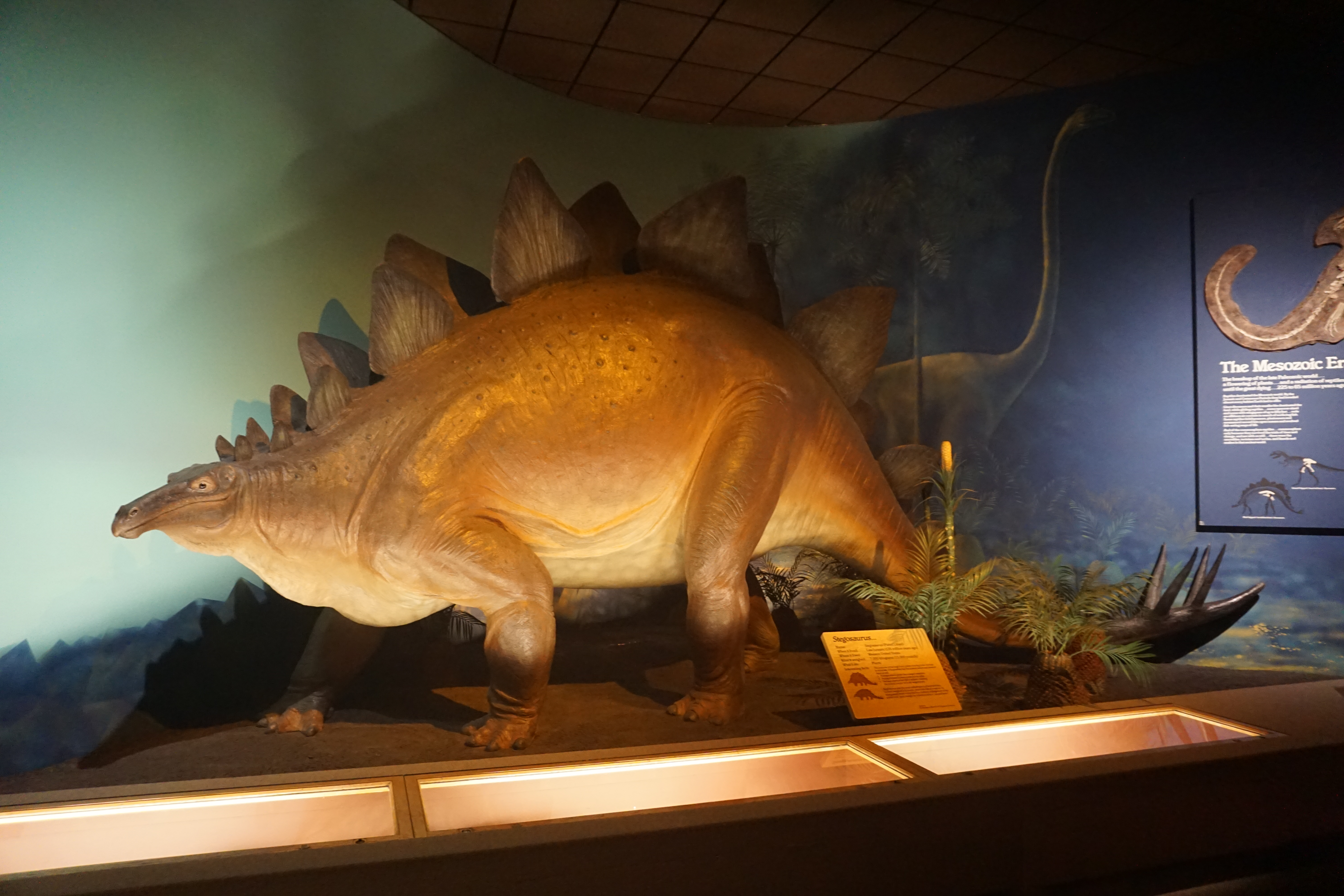
The Stegosaurus model at the Milwaukee Public Museum since 1983

== Names referring to Stegosaurus ==
Stegosaurus has been the basis for multiple scientific names. The poorly known armored dinosaur Stegosaurides Bohlin 1953 (meaning "Stegosaurus-like") from China was named for a supposed resemblance to Stegosaurus, but the fossil material is very incomplete, consisting mainly of two vertebrae and part of a spine. The striking appearance of Stegosaurus with its upright triangular armored plates has also inspired scientific names for animals completely unrelated to dinosaurs, including the genus Stegosauroniscus Schmolzer 1974, a small woodlouse land crustacean from Africa with "paired triangular plate-like processes" on its body segments. Other organisms with names evoking a resemblance to Stegosaurus in some way include the species Tambja stegosauriformis Pola, Cervera & Gosliner 2005 (a nudibranch), Coleophora stegosaurus Falkovitsh 1972 (a lepidopteran), Panoploea stegosaura Griffiths 1975 (an amphipod), Pseudisobrachium stegosaurus Colombo, Gobbi & Azevedo 2021 (a hymenopteran), and Mengeosphaera stegosauriformis Liu, Xiao, Yin, Chen, Zhou & Li 2014 (an Ediacaran microfossil).

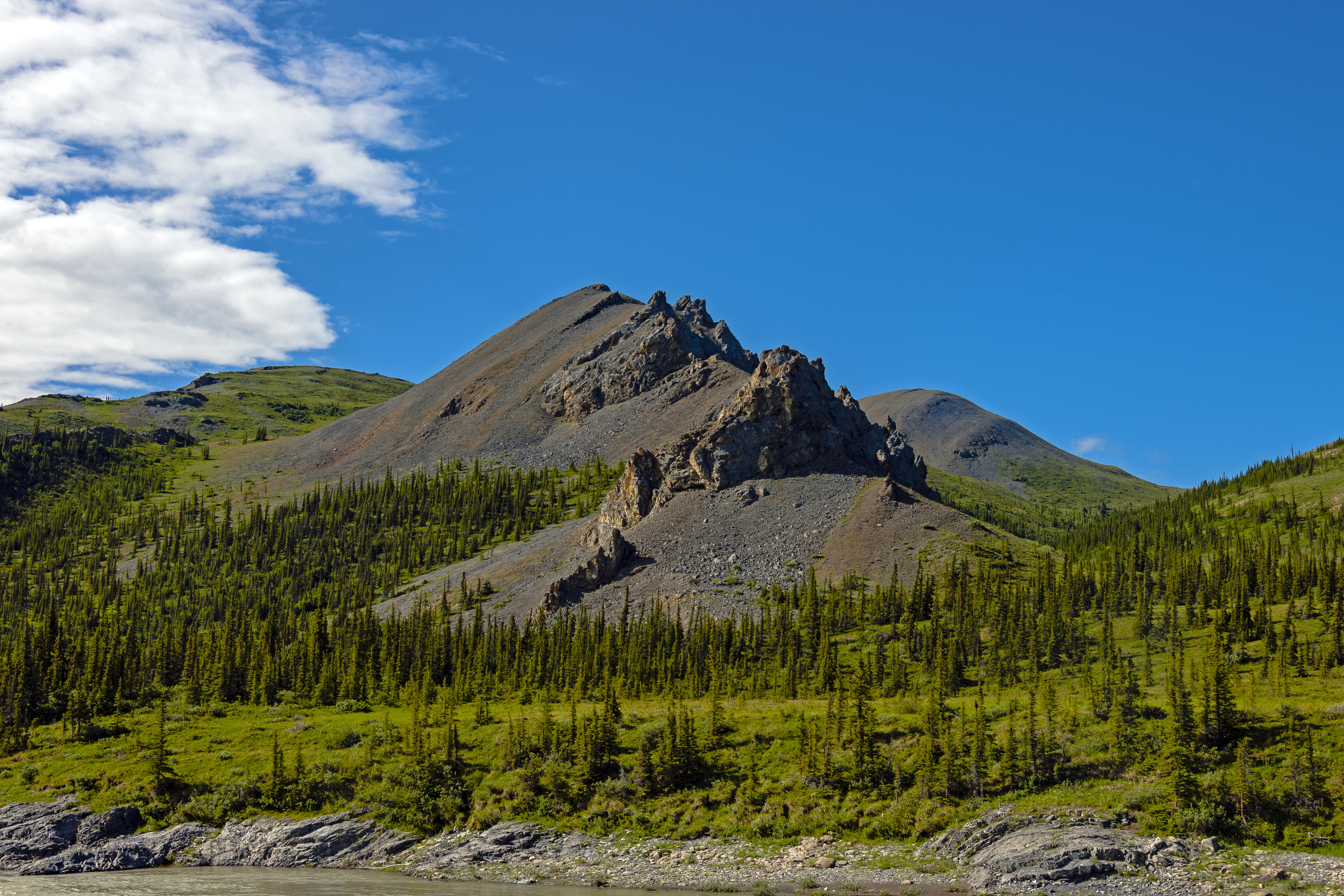
Mountain informally named "Stegosaurus Ridge" for its resemblance to the dinosaur, above the Firth River, in Canada's Ivvavik National Park in Yukon Territory.

However, the carnivorous sponge Abyssocladia stegosaurensis Hestetun, Rapp & Pomponi 2019 was named after the undersea geographical feature "Stegosaurus Ridge" off the Northern Mariana Islands, one of a number of local names for jagged rocky outcrops or ridges in different places in the world that allude to Stegosaurus (such as "Stegosaurus Ridge" in Taiwan and "Stegosaurus Butte" in Washington state).

== See also ==
- Timeline of stegosaur research
- List of films featuring dinosaurs
- Cultural depictions of dinosaurs
  - Tyrannosaurus in popular culture
