= Cultural depictions of dinosaurs =

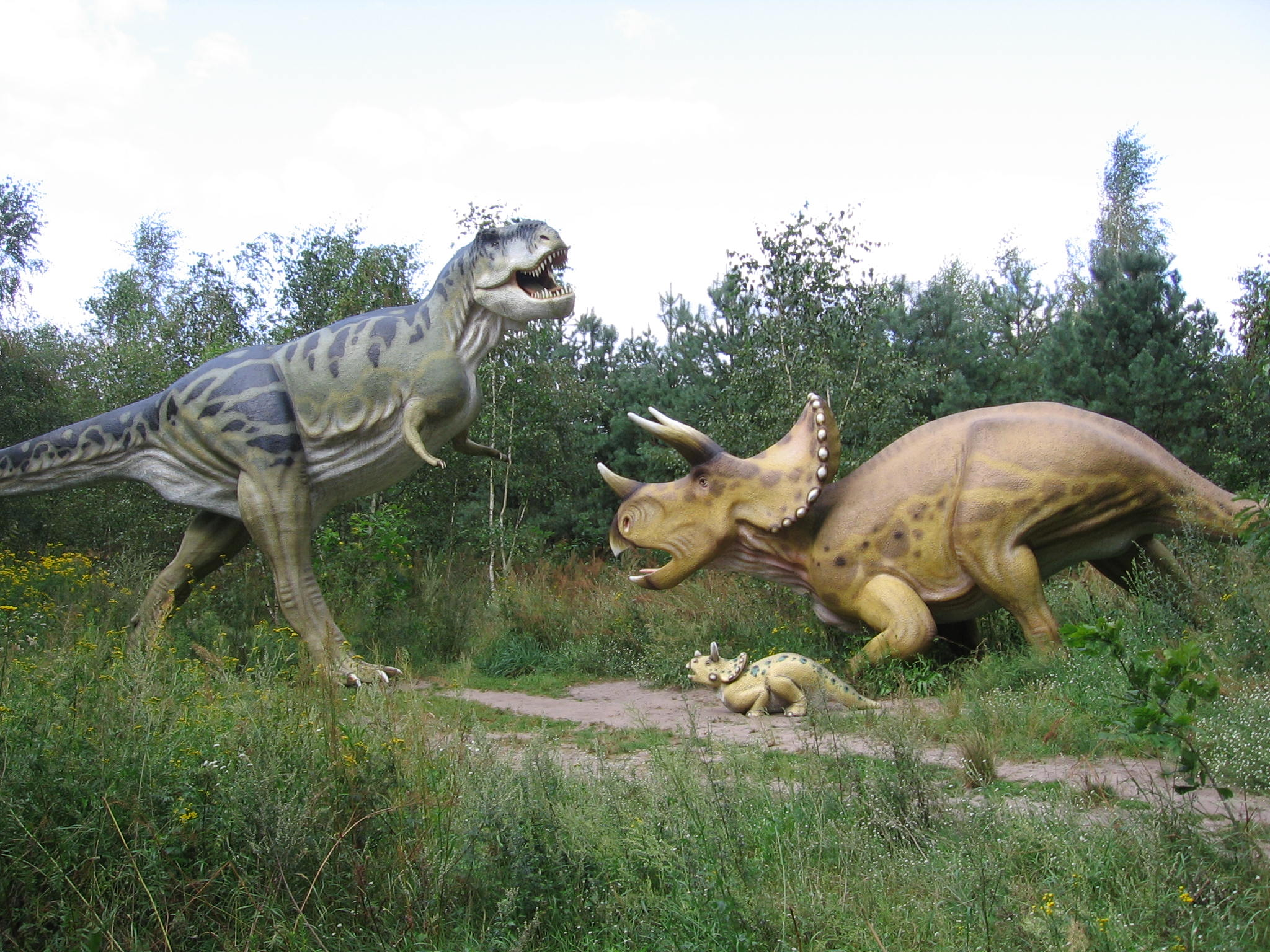
Models recreating a fight between Triceratops and Tyrannosaurus rex. Epic battles that might have occurred are a popular theme.

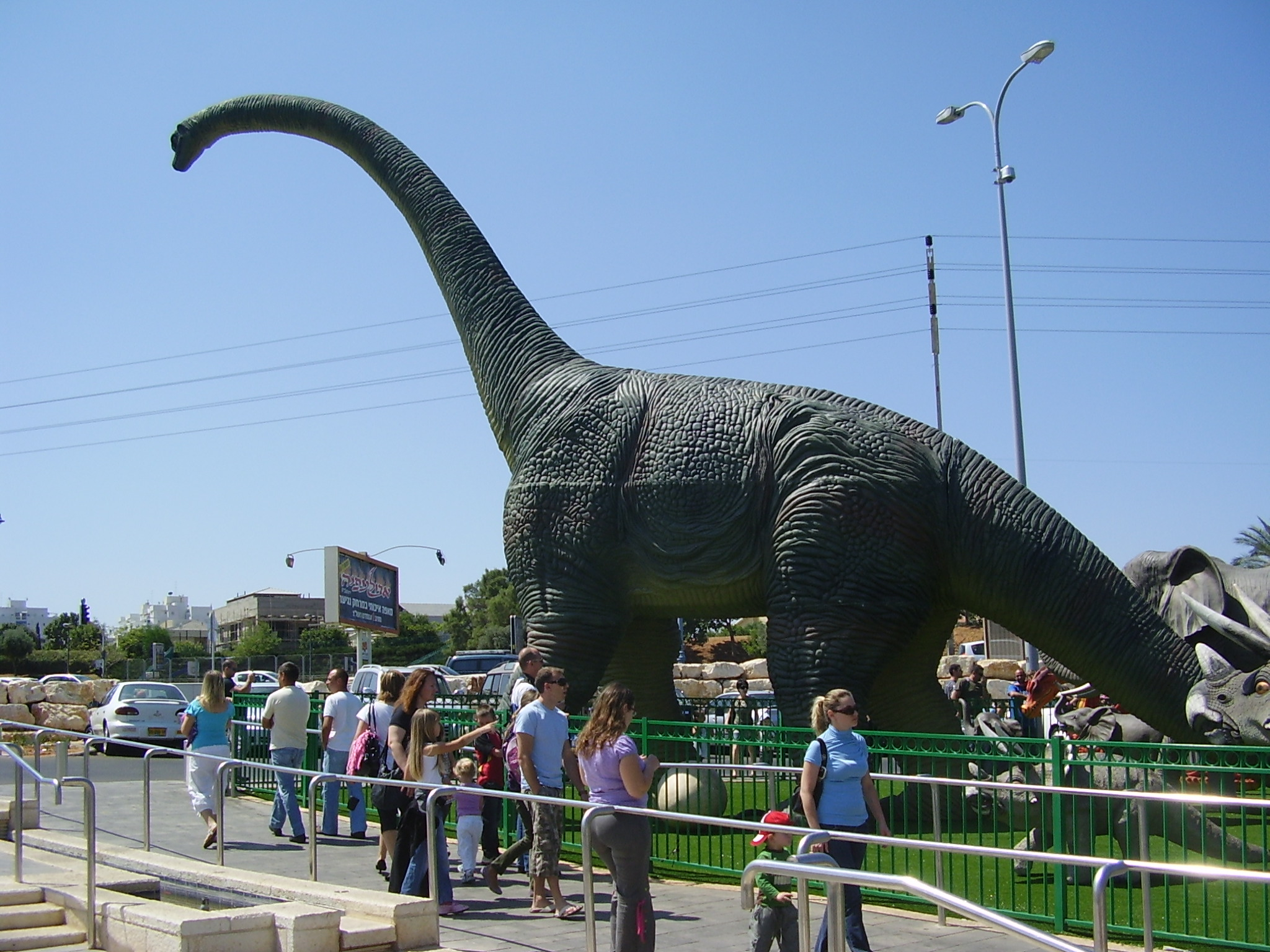
A large model of Brachiosaurus in Rishon LeZion's Cinema City, Israel.

Since the coining of the word "dinosaur" in 1842, dinosaurs have served as a cornerstone of paleontology in popular culture. The non-avian dinosaurs featured in books, films, television programs, artwork, and various other pieces of media have been used for both education and entertainment. The depictions range from the realistic, as in the television documentaries from the 1990s into the first decades of the 21st century, to the fantastic, as in the monster movies of the 1950s and 1960s.

The growth in interest in dinosaurs since the dinosaur renaissance has been accompanied by depictions made by artists working with ideas at the forefront of dinosaur science, presenting lively dinosaurs and feathered dinosaurs as these concepts were first being considered. Cultural depictions of dinosaurs have been an important means of translating scientific discoveries to the public.

Cultural depictions have also created or reinforced misconceptions about dinosaurs and other prehistoric animals, such as inaccurately and anachronistically portraying a sort of "prehistoric world" where many kinds of extinct animals (from the Permian animal Dimetrodon to mammoths and cavemen) lived together, and dinosaurs lived lives of constant combat. Other misconceptions reinforced by cultural depictions came from a scientific consensus that has now been overturned, such as dinosaurs being slow and unintelligent, or the use of dinosaur to describe something that is maladapted or obsolete.

Depictions are necessarily conjectural, because petrification and other fossilization mechanisms do not preserve all details.

== History of depictions ==
=== Early human history to 1900: Early depictions ===
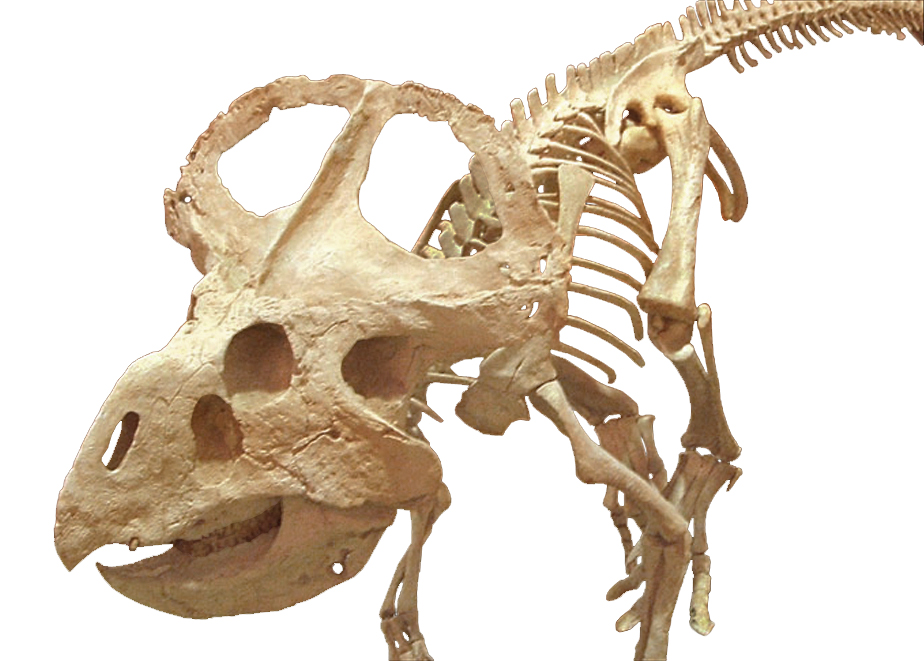
Protoceratops skeleton at the Wyoming Dinosaur Center

The classical folklorist Adrienne Mayor has proposed that the profusion of literary descriptions and imagery of the griffin in Greek and Roman literature and art beginning in the 7th century BC to the 3rd century AD were influenced by observations and travelers' accounts of fossilized beaked dinosaur skeletons found in the Turpan and Junggar basins and Gobi Desert. She noted that according to Aristeas, Sophocles, Herodotus, and other ancient writers, griffins were said to inhabit and lay eggs in nests on the ground in the lands beyond the Issedonian territory of the region surrounding the Altai Mountains. Tales of these griffins traveled from east to west along the silk routes. Mayor draws connections to Protoceratops, a frilled dinosaur and Psittacosaur fossils and dinosaur nests with eggs conspicuous in the Gobi, sharing features associated with griffins: sharp beaks, four legs, claws, similar size, large eyes (or eye sockets in the case of the fossils), and the neck frill of Protoceratops, with large open holes, argued as inspiring descriptions of the griffin's large ears or wings. The palaeontologist Mark Witton notes in his blog that Mayor's suggestion ignores pre-Mycenaean accounts, and has not found favour with archaeologists including N. Wyatt and T.F. Tartaron. Many Near Eastern and Minoan artworks feature imaginary composite creatures, including quadrupeds with birds' heads but these were not called "griffins" and no writings link them to the strange beasts of Central Asia. There are no pre-Mycenaean or Minoan texts to relate bird-headed quadrupeds with classical griffins.

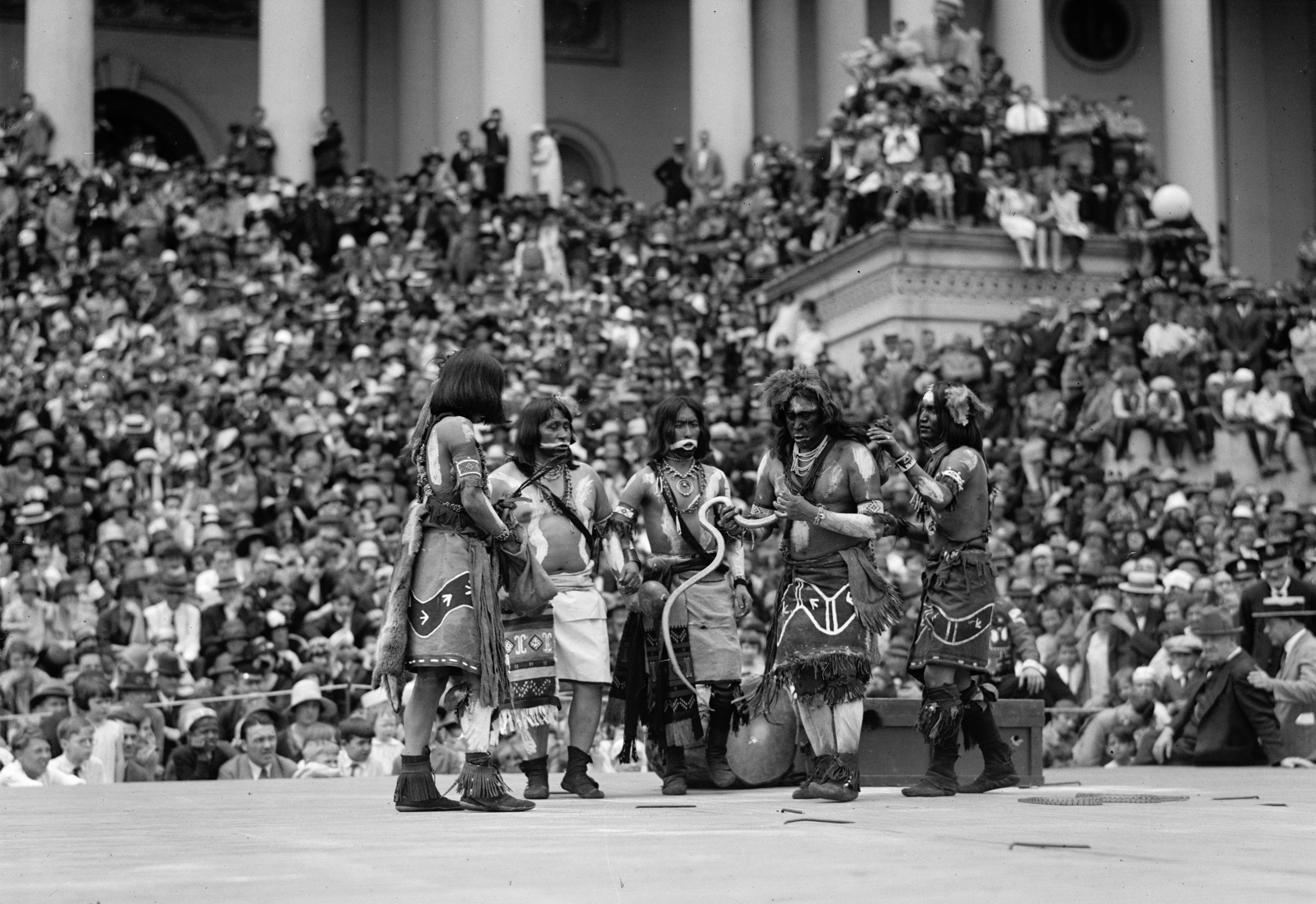
According to Adrienne Mayor, the use of tridactyl tracks as decoration in Native American costumes, as seen during this Hopi snake dance, were probably inspired by dinosaur tracks

According to Mayor, Navajos used to hold ceremonies and make offerings to dinosaur tracks in Arizona. Tridactyl tracks were also featured as decorations on the costumes and rock art of the Hopi and Zuni, probably influenced by such dinosaur tracks.

The scientific study of dinosaurs began in 1820s England. In 1842, Richard Owen coined the term dinosaur, which in his vision were elephantine reptiles. An ambitious promoter of his discoveries and theories, Owen was the driving force for the Crystal Palace dinosaur sculptures, the first large-scale public dinosaur reconstructions (1854). These sculptures, which can still be seen today, immortalized a very early stage in the perception of dinosaurs.

A Megalosaurus statue at Crystal Palace Park in London.

The Crystal Palace sculptures were successful enough that Benjamin Waterhouse Hawkins, Owen's collaborator, sold models of his sculptures and planned a second exhibition, Paleozoic Museum, for Central Park in Manhattan in the late 1860s; it was never completed due to the interference of local politics and "Boss" William Marcy Tweed.

In the same period, dinosaurs first appeared in popular literature, with a passing mention of an Owen-style Megalosaurus in Charles Dickens's Bleak House (1852–1853). However, depictions of dinosaurs were rare in the 19th century, possibly due to incomplete knowledge. Despite the well-publicized "Bone Wars" of the late 19th century between the American palaeontologists Edward Drinker Cope and Othniel Charles Marsh, dinosaurs were not yet ingrained in culture. Marsh, although a pioneer of skeletal reconstructions, did not support putting mounted skeletons on display, and derided the Crystal Palace sculptures.

=== 1900 to the 1930s: New media ===
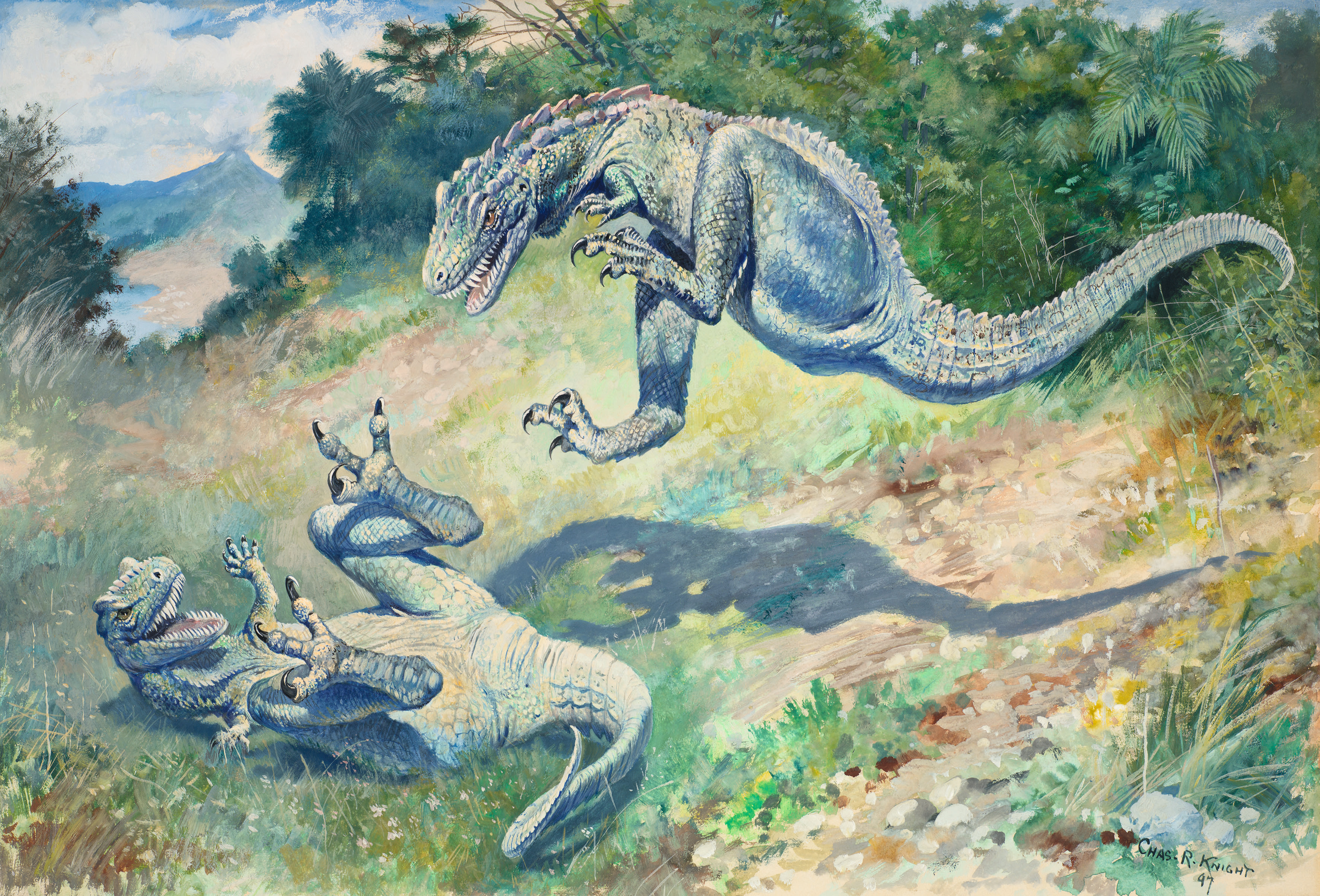
The 1897 painting of "Laelaps" (now Dryptosaurus) by Charles R. Knight.

As study caught up to the wealth of new material from western North America, and venues for depictions proliferated, dinosaurs gained in popularity. The paintings of Charles R. Knight were the first influential representations of these finds. Knight worked extensively with the American Museum of Natural History and its director, Henry Fairfield Osborn, who wanted to use dinosaurs and other prehistoric animals to promote his museum and his ideas on evolution.

Knight's work, found in museums around the United States, helped popularize dinosaurs and influenced generations of paleoartists. His early work showing fighting "Laelaps" (=Dryptosaurus) depicted dinosaurs as much more lively than they would be presented for much of the 20th century. At the same time, improvements in casting allowed dinosaur skeletons to be reproduced and shipped across the world for display in far-flung museums, bringing them to the attention of a wider audience; Diplodocus was the first such dinosaur reproduced in this way.

Winsor McCay's animated Brontosaurus in the 1914 film Gertie the Dinosaur.

Dinosaurs began appearing in films soon after the introduction of cinema, the first being the good-natured animated Gertie the Dinosaur in 1914. However, lovable dinosaurs were quickly replaced as moviemakers recognized the thrill of huge frightening monsters. D. W. Griffith in 1914's Brute Force provided the first example of a threatening cinematic dinosaur, a Ceratosaurus who menaced cavemen. This film enshrined the fiction that dinosaurs and early humans lived together, and set up the cliché that dinosaurs were bloodthirsty and attacked anything that moved.

The now-common trope of dinosaurs extant in isolated locations in today's world appeared at the same time, beginning with Arthur Conan Doyle's The Lost World (1912) and the works of Edgar Rice Burroughs. The Lost World crossed into the movies in 1925, setting heights for special effects and attempts at scientific accuracy. It is unusual, even today, for attempting to portray dinosaurs as something other than monsters in constant combat.

The stop-motion techniques of Willis O'Brien went on to bring dinosaurs to life in the 1933 film King Kong, which merged the tropes of dinosaur combat and dinosaurs in a lost world. His protégé Ray Harryhausen would continue to refine this method, but most later dinosaurs movies until the advent of CGI would eschew such expensive effects for cheaper methods, such as humans in dinosaur suits and modern reptiles with dinosaur decorations, enlarged by cinematography. Dinosaur depictions diversified in the 1930s, spreading to newspaper comic strips in Alley Oop and to advertising for Sinclair Oil.

=== The 1930s to the 1970s: Moribund dinosaurs to renaissance ===
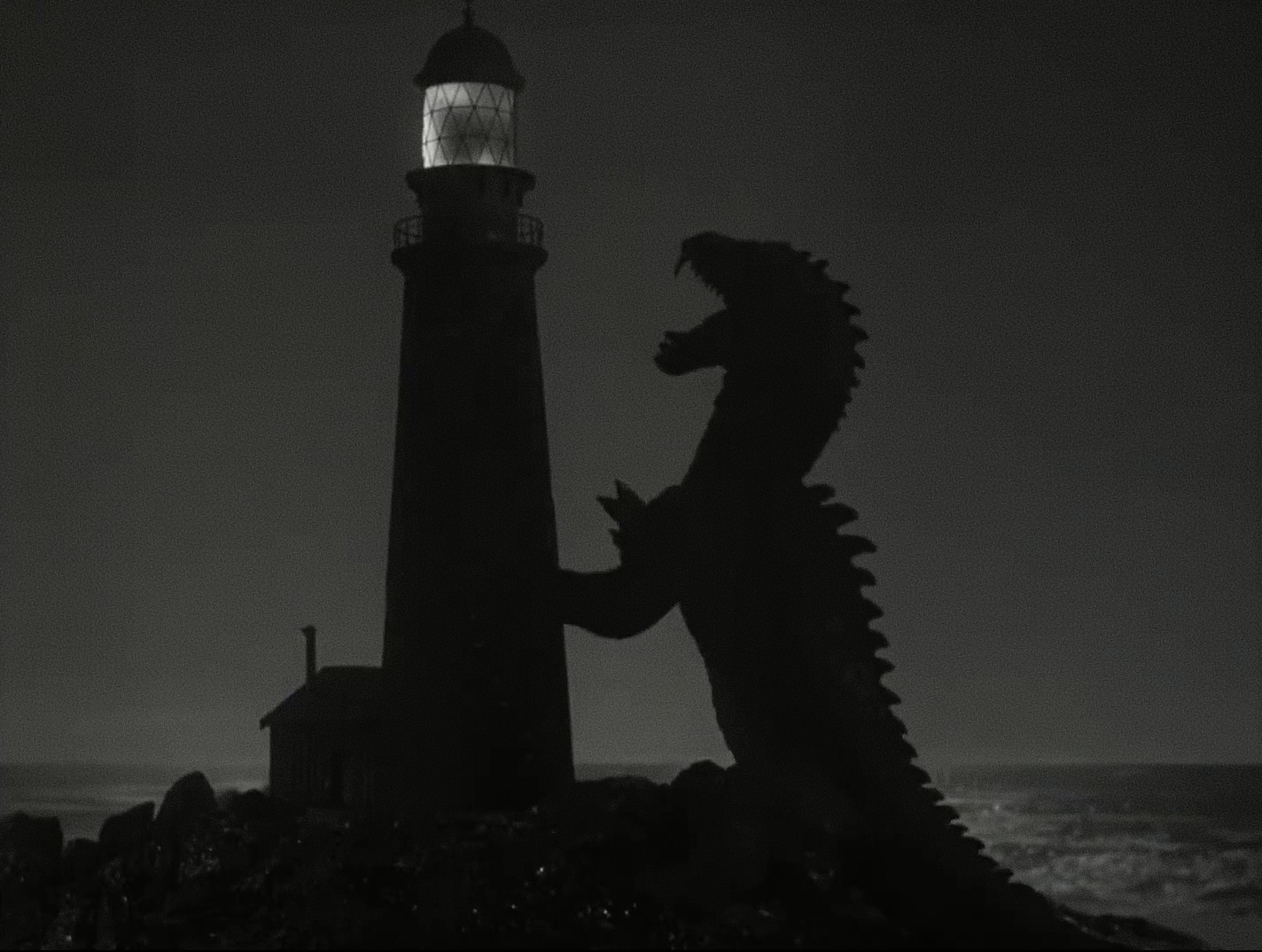
The fictional Rhedosaurus in The Beast from 20,000 Fathoms (1953), which was possibly the first fictional species of dinosaur to appear on-screen

The Great Depression and World War II combined to sink the study of dinosaurs into a decades-long lull. Scientists considered dinosaurs a group of unrelated animals that left no descendants, and dinosaurs were presented as stupid, slow, stuck in swamps, and doomed to extinction. Scientific dinosaur artwork, primarily from Rudolph F. Zallinger and Zdeněk Burian, reflected and reinforced the conception of dinosaurs as slow and static (one artistic quirk that became commonplace in representations of Mesozoic landscapes, the presence of a volcano, was a hallmark of Zallinger's). From such ideas came the alternate use of "dinosaur" as something out of date.

Films of the time typically used dinosaurs as monsters, with the added element of atomic fears in the early Cold War. Thus, The Beast from 20,000 Fathoms (1953) and Godzilla (Japanese release 1954; American release 1956 as Godzilla, King of the Monsters!) portray monstrous dinosaur-like prehistoric reptiles that go on rampages after being awakened by atomic bomb tests. An alternative appears in Disney's animated Fantasia (1940) in its The Rite of Spring sequence, which attempted to portray dinosaurs with some scientific accuracy (although it has the common error of showing prehistoric animals from many different time periods living at the same time) and also in Karel Zeman's Journey to the Beginning of Time (1955; Cesta do pravěku), a Czechoslovak children's science fiction movie inspired by Zdeněk Burian's work.

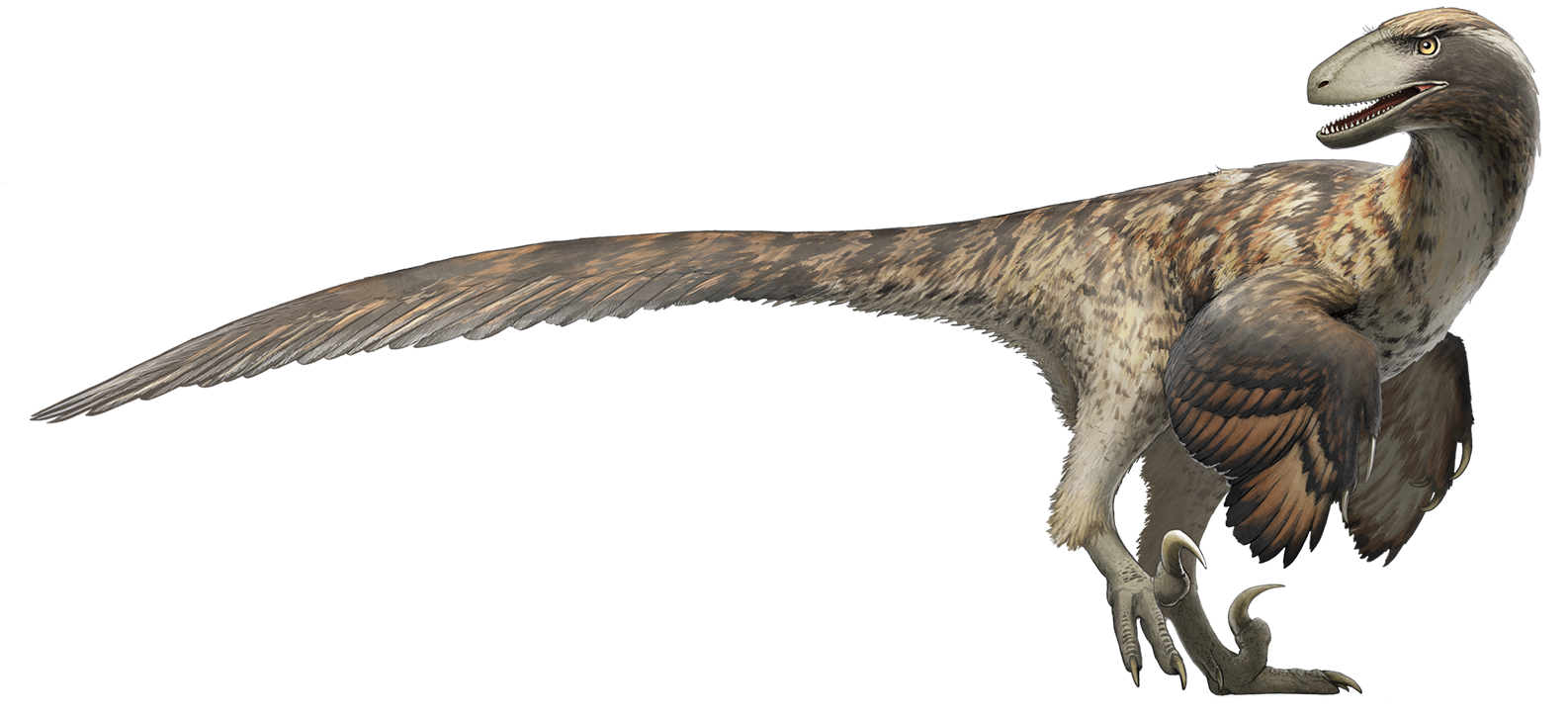
Feathered restoration of Deinonychus antirrhopus

In 1956, Oliver Butterworth authored a children's book, The Enormous Egg. The book and a movie adaptation televised in 1968 by the NBC Children's Theatre tell the story of a boy who finds an enormous egg laid by a hen that hatches a baby Triceratops. The dinosaur, named Uncle Beazley, becomes too big, so the boy brings him to the Smithsonian Institution in Washington, D.C. Beazley is first kept at the National Museum of Natural History, but is eventually transferred to the National Zoo's Elephant House because there is a law against stabling large animals in the District of Columbia. In the later part of the book, Uncle Beazley must be saved from a narrow-minded Senator who wants it destroyed. (Senator Joseph McCarthy was at the peak of his career at the time of writing.)

Dinosaurs gained a home in television in the 1960s animated sitcom The Flintstones, in another example of dinosaurs shown as coexisting with humans (for comedic effect in this case). Dinosaurs also entered comic books in this period in such series as Tor and Turok, Son of Stone, where prehistoric humans fought anachronistic dinosaurs. For those wanting more scientific accounts of dinosaurs, there were the first nontechnical dinosaur books. Ned Colbert's The Dinosaur Book (1945) was the first such book, and its status as the only such book for many years made Colbert an important figure for the coming generations of paleontologists and dinosaur enthusiasts.

In the 1960s, paleontologist John Ostrom began work on the theropod Deinonychus. His findings, which were expanded upon by his student Robert T. Bakker, contributed to the dinosaur renaissance, a revolution in the study of dinosaurs. Of particular importance were a reevaluation of the origin of birds that showed them to be closely related to coelurosaurian dinosaurs, reappraisal of dinosaur physiology that suggested they were not the sluggish cold-blooded animals that they had long been assumed to be, and a recognition that dinosaurs formed a natural group.

Soon thereafter came new evidence on dinosaur social behavior, with nests of Maiasaura suggesting parental care. These findings were reflected in the work of a new generation of paleoartists. One milestone was Sarah Landry's feathered dinosaur in Bakker's 1975 Scientific American article, "Dinosaur Renaissance".

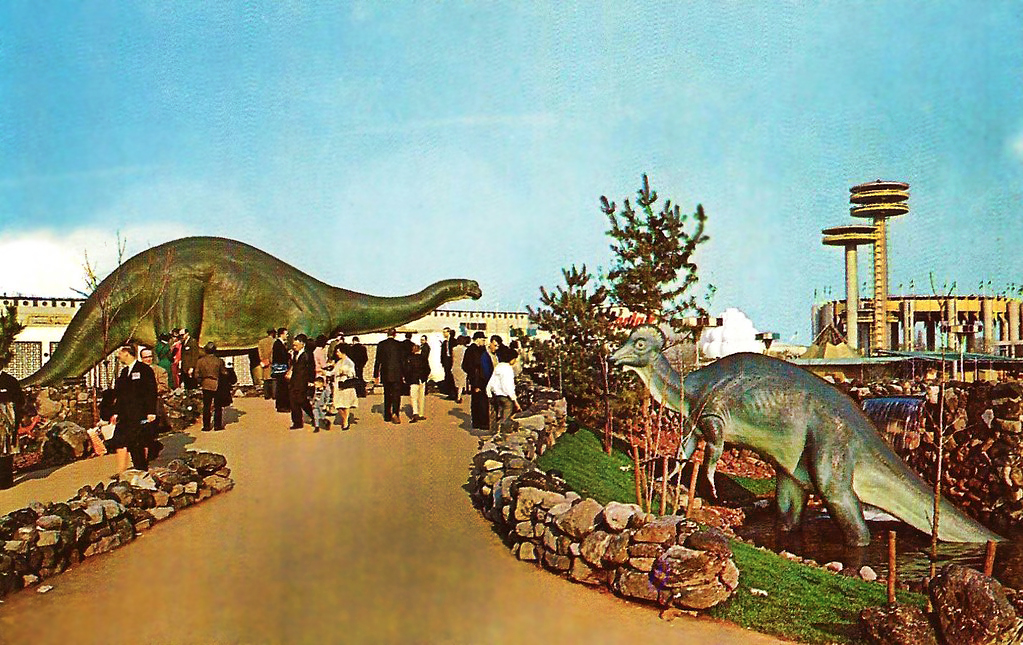
Sinclair Oil Dinoland at the 1964 New York World's Fair

Louis Paul Jonas created full-sized dinosaur sculptures for the 1964 New York World's Fair in the "Dinoland" area, which was sponsored by the Sinclair Oil Corporation, whose logo featured a dinosaur. Jonas consulted with paleontologists Barnum Brown, Edwin H. Colbert and John Ostrom in order to create nine sculptures that were as accurate as possible according to the science of the day, including postures with dragging tails (later found to be incorrect). After the Fair closed, the dinosaur models toured the country on flatbed trailers as part of a company advertising campaign. Most of the statues are now on display at various museums and parks.

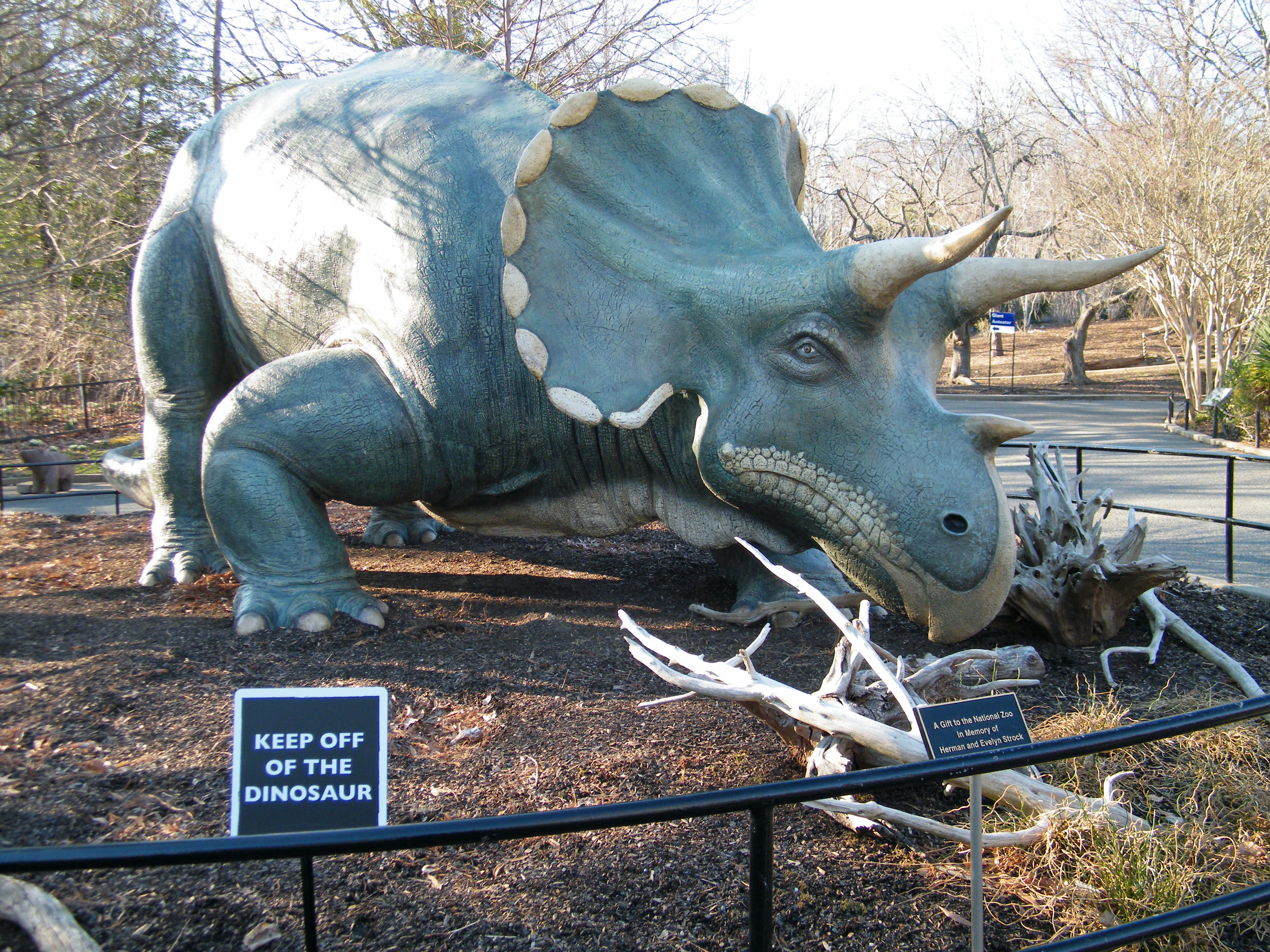
Uncle Beazley at the National Zoo in February 2012 after repainting

In 1967, the Sinclair Oil Corporation gave a fiberglass model of a Triceratops to the Smithsonian Institution. The model, which appeared in The Enormous Egg television movie in 1968 as Uncle Beazley, is now on display at the National Zoo in Washington, D.C. From the 1970s to 1994, the statue was located on the National Mall in front of the National Museum of Natural History. The model was a copy of the original Triceratops created for the 1964 World’s Fair, which the Sinclair Oil Corporation donated to the Kentucky Science Center in Louisville (formerly named the "Louisville Museum of Natural History and Science" and the "Louisville Science Center") in 1968. The sculpture, nicknamed "Lottie", is now on display outside the museum after being restored in 2022.

=== The 1980s to the present: Dinosaurs reconsidered ===
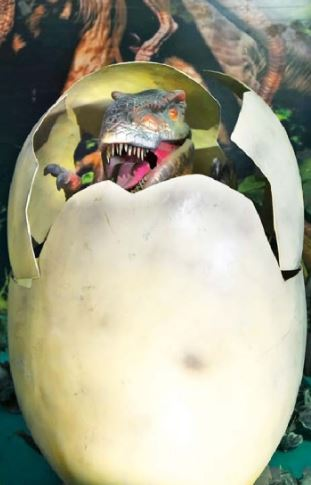
A Robotic dinosaur at Sector-17, Chandigarh

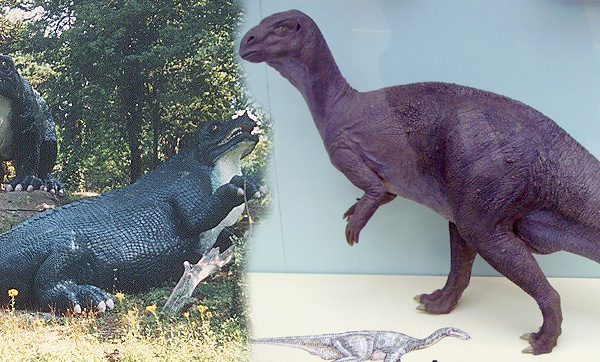
Various outdated reconstructions of Iguanodon

The reevaluation of dinosaurs spurred public interest, with the new generation of paleoartists quick to respond. Artists such as Mark Hallett, Doug Henderson, John Gurche, Gregory S. Paul, William Stout, and Bob Walters illustrated the new findings in response to the demand.

By the latter half of the 1980s and into the 1990s, other media were showing the influence of the increased popularity, with diverse depictions aimed at a variety of ages and interests.

In 1990, the Smithsonian Institution's National Museum of Natural History in Washington, D.C., featured an exhibition of dinosaur sculpture by Jim Gary that drew more visitors than any of its previous exhibits. His Twentieth Century Dinosaurs, popular since the 1960s, began being featured in textbooks, encyclopedias, and videos as well as later, by the likes of National Geographic, in their publications for children in 1975, and they featured Gary as the cover story for National Geographic World in September 1978.

For preschoolers, there was the educational television show Barney & Friends starting in 1992; their older siblings had the 1988 animated film The Land Before Time and its rapidly increasing line of direct to video sequels (13 by 2016). Dinosaucers was a cartoon television show from the 1980s. Dinosaurs, a television sitcom, parodied humans and other television shows. Of particular note is Michael Crichton's 1990 novel, Jurassic Park, the popularity of which led to a series of films and other related media and inspired a future generation of dinosaur novels, including Ethan Pettus's Primitive War series and Thomas Asher's RIFT: The Sixth Extinction, the latter of which draws inspiration for its themes surrounding resurrection science. The first of the Jurassic films, Jurassic Park, married advanced CGI with advances in scientific knowledge of dinosaurs. The 2000 Disney animated film Dinosaur was the most expensive movie in 2000, but was a box-office success, as were other films such as the 2009 animated film Ice Age 3: Dawn of the Dinosaurs, the 2012 film The Dino King, the 2013 film Walking with Dinosaurs: The Movie and the 2015 Disney/Pixar animated film The Good Dinosaur. The falling cost of computer-generated effects also has recently allowed the increased production of documentaries for television; the award-winning 1999 BBC series Walking with Dinosaurs, the 2001 When Dinosaurs Roamed America, the 2003 Dinosaur Planet, the 2009 Animal Armageddon, the 2011 Dinosaur Revolution, the 2011 Planet Dinosaur and the 2022 Prehistoric Planet are notable examples. There are numerous theme parks and rides dedicated to dinosaurs including Jurassic Park: The Ride at Universal Orlando and Dinosaur in Disney’s Animal Kingdom.

== Public perception of dinosaurs ==
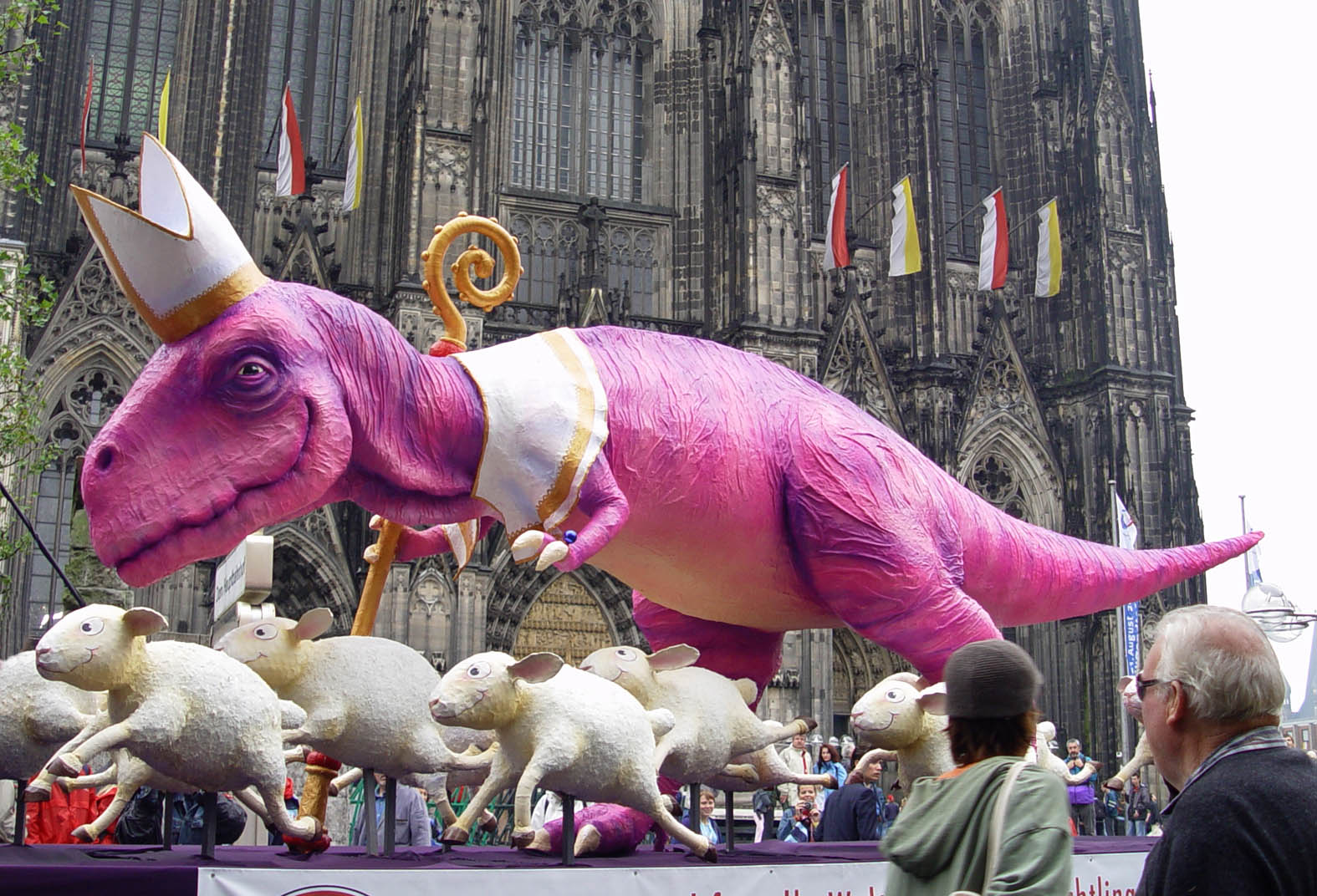
Sculpture of tyrannosaurid and sheep (10 meters long and 4 meters tall) as anticlerical propaganda

The popular ideals of dinosaurs have many misconceptions, reinforced by films, books, comics, television shows, and even theme parks. Typical errors include: prehistoric humans living with non-avian dinosaurs; dinosaurs as monsters that did little else but fight; the portrayal of a kind of "prehistoric world" where all prehistoric animals are shown to exist; dinosaurs as all large; dinosaurs as stupid and slow-moving; dinosaurs as being lizard-like and all scaled (non-feathered) when many theropod dinosaurs such as Velociraptor had feathers, and the inclusion of many prehistoric animals (such as Dimetrodon, pterosaurs, plesiosaurs, ichthyosaurs, and mosasaurs) as dinosaurs. Moreover, dinosaurs did not become extinct due to being generally maladapted or unable to cope with normal climatic change, a view found in many older textbooks.

Reports in the news media of dinosaur finds and dinosaur science are often inaccurate and sensationalistic, and popular dinosaur books usually lag scientific understanding. Dinosaur toys and models are often inaccurate, packaged indiscriminately with other prehistoric animals, or have fictitious additions like the large sharp teeth in some rubber Triceratops toys.

The pejorative use of "dinosaur" as something behind the times has been applied to people, styles, and ideas that are perceived to be out of date and on the wane. For example, members of the punk movement derided the "progressive" bands that preceded them as "dinosaur bands".

However, some popular depictors have striven for accuracy and presented up-to-date information; Michael Crichton and Bill Watterson (of Calvin and Hobbes) are two recent examples. Paleoartists and illustrators in particular have kept up with research. Popular conceptions of dinosaurs have also been important in stimulating the interest and imagination of young people, and have been responsible for introducing many who would later become paleontologists to the field. In addition, popular depictions have the freedom to be more imaginative and speculative than technical works.

=== Usage ===
The typical use of dinosaurs in popular culture has been as vicious monsters. There are several distinct genres of dinosaur depictions commonly used: "lost worlds" on modern Earth; time travel stories; educational works for children; prehistoric world stories (often with cavemen); and dinosaurs running amok in the modern world.

=== Appeal ===
The appeal of dinosaurs, as suggested by author, researcher, and dinosaur enthusiast Donald F. Glut, has multiple factors. Non-avian dinosaurs were "monsters," yet are safely extinct, allowing for vicarious thrills. They appeal to the imagination, and there are many ways to approach them intellectually. Finally, they appeal to adults nostalgic for what they enjoyed as children. Children have been particularly drawn to dinosaurs over the years.

== Impact of the dinosaur on society ==
The scientific discoveries of dinosaurs sometimes led to creation of local museums with positive impact on the local society and economy.

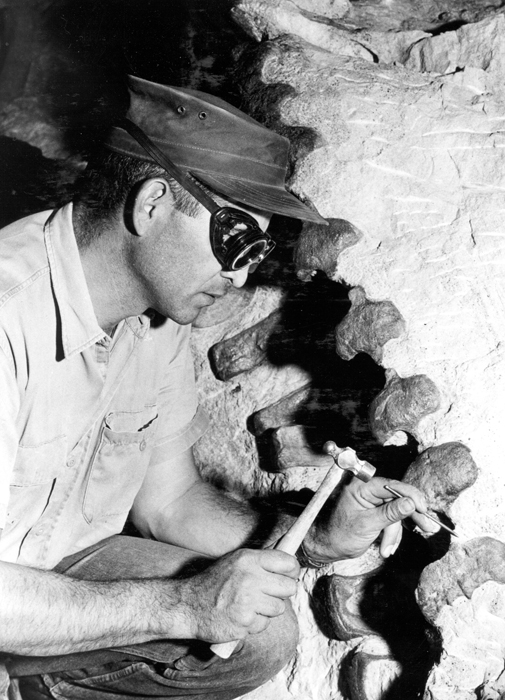
Paleontologist chips rock matrix from a column of vertebrae in the Dinosaur Quarry.

On the border between Utah and Colorado, dinosaur fossil beds (bone beds) were discovered in 1909 by Earl Douglass, a paleontologist working and collecting for the Carnegie Museum of Natural History. He and his crews excavated thousands of fossils and shipped them back to the museum in Pittsburgh, Pennsylvania for study and display. President Woodrow Wilson proclaimed the dinosaur beds as Dinosaur National Monument in 1915. The monument boundaries were expanded in 1938 from the original 80 acres (0.13 sq mi; 0.32 km^{2}) surrounding the dinosaur quarry in Utah, to 210,844 acres (329 sq mi; 853 km^{2}) in Utah and Colorado, encompassing the river canyons of the Green and Yampa. Due to the popularity of the National Monument, nearby towns became enmeshed in both the industries of paleontology and of tourism. On January 1, 1966, the town of Artesia, Colorado changed its name to Dinosaur due to its proximity to Dinosaur National Monument. The headquarters of Dinosaur National Monument is located just east of the town on U.S. Highway 40.

One modern example is the discovery of dinosaurs from the Lourinhã Formation next to the town of Lourinhã, in Portugal, most notable for a clutch of fossilized dinosaur eggs. Found in the Upper Jurassic outcrops of Lourinhã, Portugal, and first published in 1997, the Paimogo dinosaur egg clutch possesses over one hundred eggs preserved in association with embryonic bones of the allosauroid theropod Lourinhanosaurus. Many scientific inquiries about these oofossils remain unanswered, up to the present day. After its discovery, the collection of fossils was put in the small local museum, raising tourism and allowing for other scientists to study the fossils. More than 20 years later, continually sustained paleontological interest from the public lead to both a dinosaur theme park in the region and a UNESCO Geopark.

=== In texting and computer technology ===
In April 2016, a proposal was submitted to the Unicode Consortium to encode the heads of three dinosaurs considered exemplary, the Tyrannosaurus rex, the Brontosaurus, and the Triceratops, as emoji. In the next year, 2017, the Unicode Consortium decided to add two dinosaur emojis to the Unicode and emoji standards: the Tyrannosaurus rex (🦖, at codepoint U+1F996) and a sauropod (🦕, at codepoint U+1F995).

== See also ==
- Cultural depictions of penguins
- Cultural depictions of ravens
- Dinosaur renaissance
- Golden eagles in human culture
- Human uses of reptiles
- List of fictional birds
- List of fictional dinosaurs
- List of films featuring dinosaurs
- List of U.S. state birds
- List of U.S. state dinosaurs
- Paleoart
- Prehistory Park
- Stegosaurus in popular culture
- Tyrannosaurus in popular culture
