= Hoʻopiʻi Falls =

Coordinates: 22°06′26″N 159°20′37″W

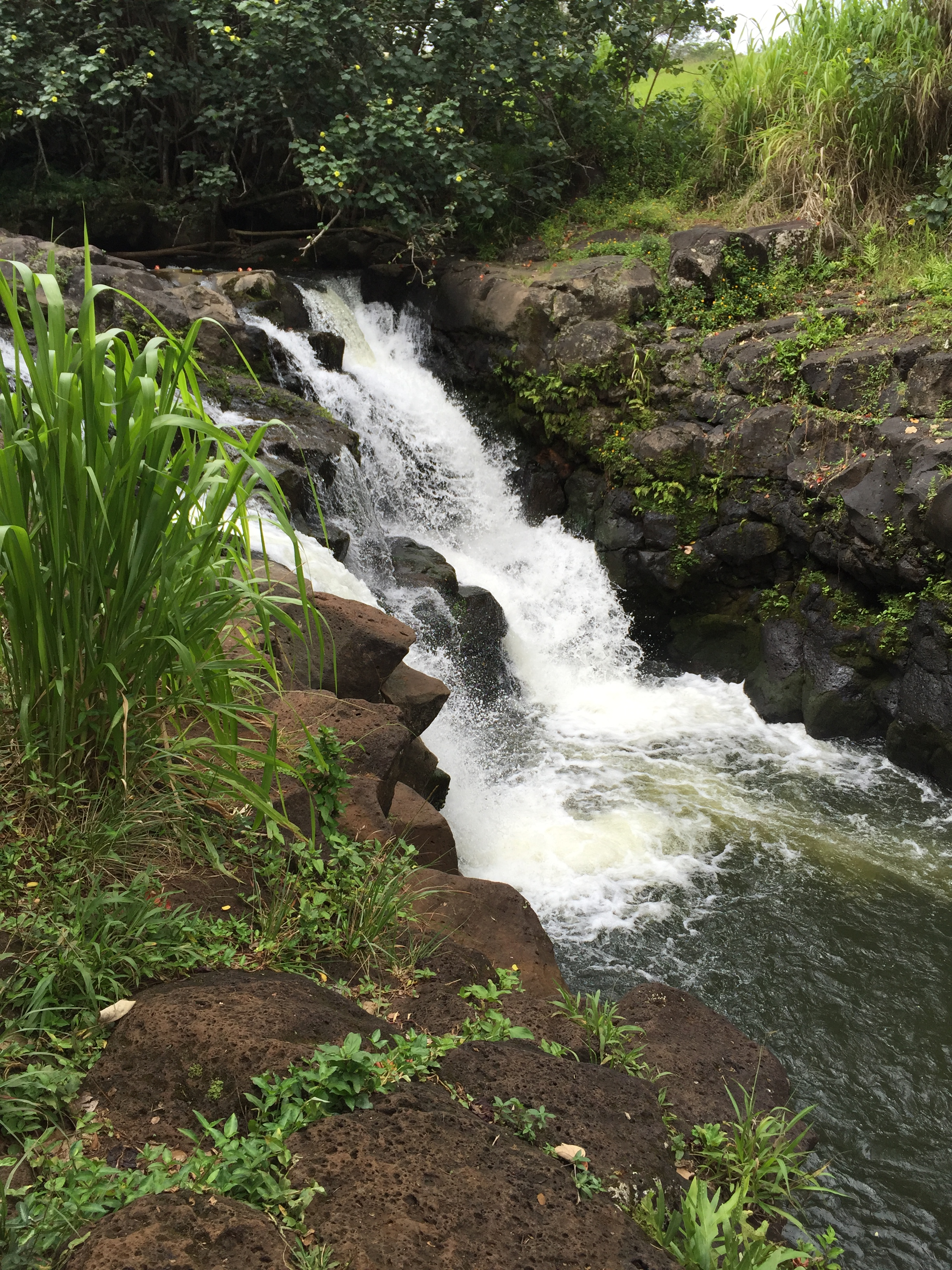
The waterfall in 2016

Hoʻopiʻi Falls are a series of waterfalls along the Kapaʻa Stream, located near the Kapaʻa town on the east shore of Kauaʻi, Hawaii. The falls were used as a filming location in Jurassic Park (1993) for the fictional site of the "Mano de Dios Amber Mine" in the Dominican Republic.

== See also ==
- List of waterfalls
