= Jurassic Park =

1993 film by Steven Spielberg

- Theatrical release poster by John Alvin
- Directed by: Steven Spielberg
- Screenplay by: Michael Crichton; David Koepp
- Based on: Jurassic Park by Michael Crichton
- Produced by: Kathleen Kennedy; Gerald R. Molen
- Starring: Sam Neill; Laura Dern; Jeff Goldblum; Richard Attenborough; Bob Peck; Martin Ferrero; BD Wong; Samuel L. Jackson; Wayne Knight; Joseph Mazzello; Ariana Richards
- Cinematography: Dean Cundey
- Edited by: Michael Kahn
- Music by: John Williams
- Production companies: Universal Pictures; Amblin Entertainment
- Distributed by: Universal Pictures
- Release dates: June 9, 1993 (Uptown Theater); June 11, 1993 (United States)
- Running time: 127 minutes
- Country: United States
- Language: English
- Budget: $56–63 million
- Box office: $1.058 billion

Jurassic Park is a 1993 American science fiction film (Note: Jurassic Park has been described as containing elements of various genres, including thriller, disaster, monster, horror, action, adventure, and science fiction.) directed by Steven Spielberg and written by Michael Crichton and David Koepp, based on Crichton's 1990 novel of the same name. Starring Sam Neill, Laura Dern, Jeff Goldblum, and Richard Attenborough, the film follows a group of visitors struggling to survive after sabotage disables the security systems of a dinosaur theme park, releasing the dinosaurs.

Spielberg acquired the film rights before the novel's publication for $1.5 million through Universal Pictures, with Crichton receiving an additional $500,000 to adapt the story. David Koepp wrote the final screenplay, streamlining the novel and revising several characters. Filming took place in California and Hawaii from August to November 1992, followed by post-production through May 1993. The dinosaurs were created using computer-generated imagery by Industrial Light & Magic and animatronics by Stan Winston's team. Spielberg also invested in DTS to support the film's digital surround sound. Its release was accompanied by a $65 million marketing campaign involving more than 100 licensing partners.

Jurassic Park premiered in Washington, D.C., on June 9, 1993, and was released in the United States two days later. It grossed over $914 million during its original theatrical run, surpassing E.T. the Extra-Terrestrial to become the highest-grossing film of all time until the release of Titanic. The film received critical acclaim for its visual effects, sound design, action sequences, John Williams's score, and Spielberg's direction. It won three Academy Awards for sound effects editing, sound, and visual effects. Following its 20th anniversary re-release in 2013, its worldwide box-office total surpassed $1 billion.

Since its release, many film critics and industry professionals have regarded Jurassic Park as one of the greatest films ever made. Its groundbreaking use of computer-generated imagery is widely seen as a turning point that shaped the visual effects techniques used in modern cinema. In 2018, the Library of Congress selected Jurassic Park for preservation in the United States National Film Registry as "culturally, historically, or aesthetically significant". The film spawned a multimedia franchise that includes six sequels, starting with The Lost World: Jurassic Park, as well as a variety of other media.

== Plot ==
Industrialist John Hammond has created Jurassic Park, an animal theme park featuring de-extinct dinosaurs, on the tropical island Isla Nublar, off the coast of Costa Rica. After a Velociraptor kills a dinosaur handler, the park's investors, represented by lawyer Donald Gennaro, threaten to pull funding unless experts certify the island's safety. Gennaro invites the chaotician Ian Malcolm, while Hammond invites the paleontologist Alan Grant and the paleobotanist Ellie Sattler. Upon arrival, the group is shocked to see living Brachiosaurus and Parasaurolophus. At the park's visitor center, the group learns that the cloning was accomplished by extracting dinosaur DNA from prehistoric mosquitoes preserved in amber. DNA from frogs and other animals was used to fill in gaps in the dinosaurs' genome. To prevent the dinosaurs from breeding, they are all made female by chromosome manipulation.

The group witnesses the hatching of a baby Velociraptor and visits the raptor enclosure. During lunch, they debate the ethics of cloning and of the park in general. Malcolm warns of the implications of genetic engineering while Grant and Sattler express uncertainty over the ability of humans and dinosaurs to coexist. Hammond's grandchildren, Lex and Tim, join the others for a park tour in two self-driving electric vehicles, while Hammond observes them from the control room. Most of the dinosaurs fail to appear, and Sattler stays behind to study a sick Triceratops. The tour is cut short as a tropical storm approaches. The park employees leave for the mainland on a boat while the visitors return to their vehicles.

Jurassic Park's disgruntled computer programmer, Dennis Nedry, was previously bribed to steal frozen dinosaur embryos by Lewis Dodgson, a man working for Hammond's corporate rival. To access the embryo storage room, Nedry deactivates the park's security system, cutting power to the tour vehicles. Most of the park's electric fences have been deactivated, which allows a Tyrannosaurus rex to escape and attack the touring group. The Tyrannosaurus devours Gennaro and injures Malcolm while Grant, Lex, and Tim escape. On his way to deliver the embryos to the island's docks, Nedry gets lost in the rain, crashes his jeep, and is killed by a venom-spitting Dilophosaurus.

Sattler helps the game warden Robert Muldoon search for survivors; they find Malcolm just before the Tyrannosaurus returns and chases them away. Grant, Lex and Tim take shelter in a tree and encounter a Brachiosaurus herd, discovering the broken shells of dinosaur eggs the following morning. Grant concludes that the dinosaurs are breeding, which is possible because of their amphibian DNA—amphibians like West African frogs can change their sex in a single-sex environment.

Unable to decipher Nedry's code to reactivate the security system, Hammond and chief engineer Ray Arnold decide to reboot the park's systems. They shut down the power grid and retreat to an emergency bunker while Arnold heads to a maintenance shed to complete the rebooting process. When Arnold fails to return, Sattler and Muldoon go to the shed, and discover that the shutdown has released the Velociraptors. Sattler turns the power back on before being attacked by a raptor and discovering Arnold's severed arm. While she escapes, Muldoon is killed by another Velociraptor.

Grant, Lex and Tim reach the visitor center. Grant leaves to look for Sattler, leaving Lex and Tim inside. The raptors appear and pursue the children through a kitchen, but they escape and join Grant and Sattler. The group reaches the control room, and Lex restores the park's systems, allowing them to contact Hammond, who radios for a helicopter to take them off the island. The survivors are cornered by the two raptors in the visitor center, but the Tyrannosaurus appears and fights the raptors, allowing the group to flee. Grant and Hammond agree not to endorse the park, and the group leaves the island in the helicopter.

== Cast ==
- Sam Neill as Alan Grant: A paleontologist
- Laura Dern as Ellie Sattler: A paleobotanist
- Jeff Goldblum as Ian Malcolm: A mathematician and chaos theorist
- Richard Attenborough as John Hammond: CEO and founder of InGen
- Bob Peck as Robert Muldoon: Jurassic Park's game warden
- Martin Ferrero as Donald Gennaro: A lawyer representing Hammond's investors who are concerned about the safety of Jurassic Park
- B.D. Wong as Henry Wu: Jurassic Park's chief geneticist
- Samuel L. Jackson as Ray Arnold: Jurassic Park's chief engineer
- Wayne Knight as Dennis Nedry: Jurassic Park computer programmer
- Joseph Mazzello as Tim Murphy: Lex's younger brother and Hammond's grandson
- Ariana Richards as Lex Murphy: Tim's older sister and Hammond's granddaughter
- Jerry Molen as Doctor Harding: Jurassic Park veterinarian
- Miguel Sandoval as Juanito Rostagno, who oversees an amber mine for Hammond in the Dominican Republic
- Cameron Thor as Lewis Dodgson: An employee working for InGen's corporate rival, identified in the novel and later in the sequel films as Biosyn
- Whit Hertford as a boy who is lectured about raptors by Grant while at his dig site
- Jophery Brown as a dinosaur handler killed by a raptor
- Richard Kiley as the voice of the Jurassic Park tour vehicle guide
- Greg Burson as the voice of Mr. DNA

== Production ==
=== Development ===
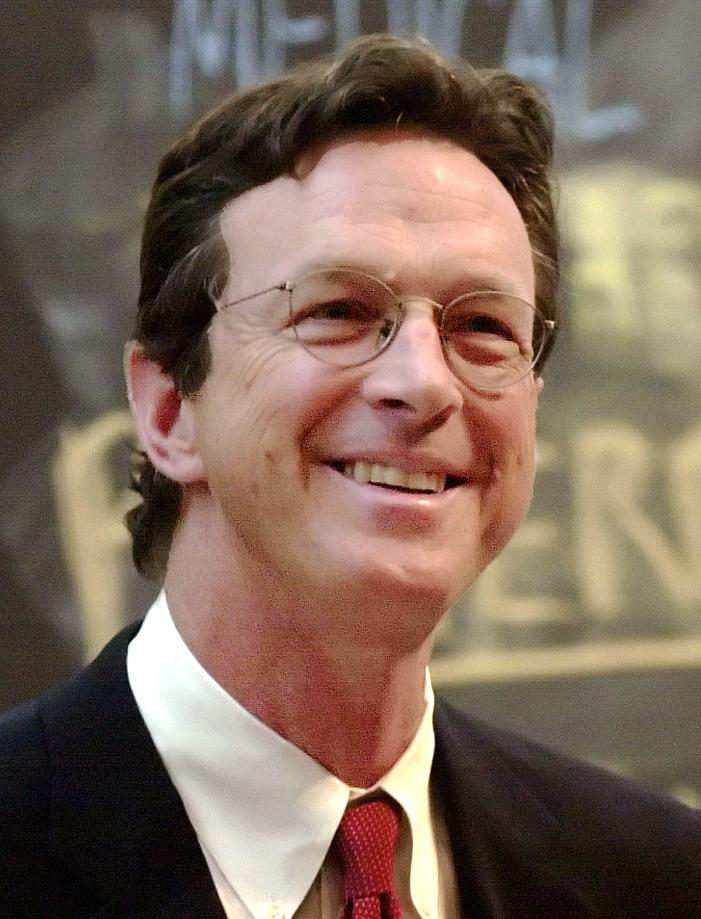
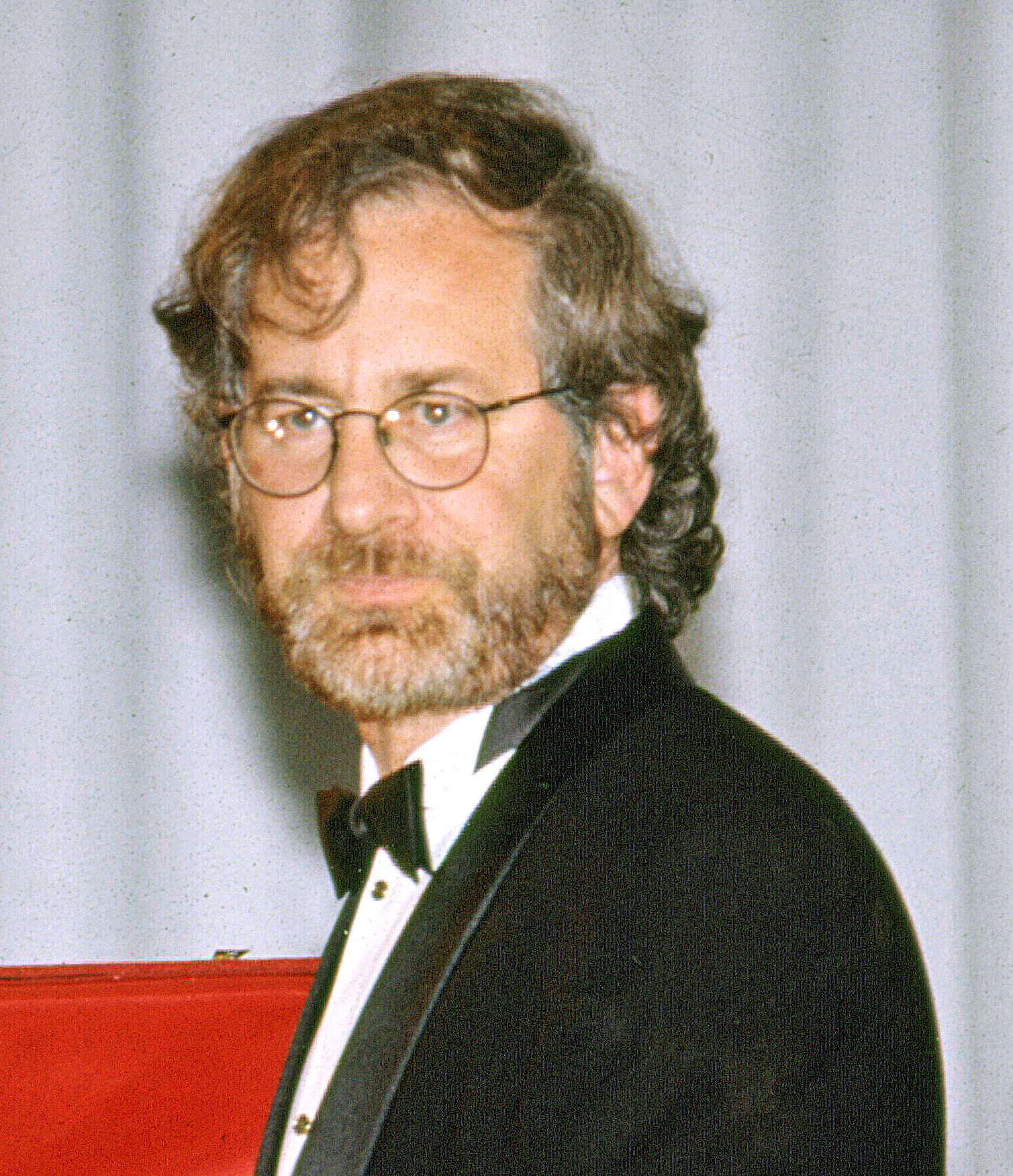
Michael Crichton's book attracted the attention of director Steven Spielberg (right) even before it was published. Crichton was also responsible for the film's first scripts.

Michael Crichton's 1990 novel Jurassic Park was originally conceived as a screenplay in the 1980s, and went through numerous changes before being published as a book. In the late 1970s, a bidding war began for the film rights to Crichton's then-upcoming novel Congo, which would not be made into a film until 1995. With Jurassic Park, Crichton hoped to avoid another bidding war and the same protracted outcome by offering the film rights at a fixed price of $1.5 million, as he was primarily concerned with ensuring that a film actually be produced; he was less interested in receiving a top offer.

Crichton submitted the Jurassic Park manuscript to his publisher in May 1990. Director Steven Spielberg learned of the novel that month while he was discussing a screenplay with Crichton that would become the television series ER. Spielberg, who had a life-long fascination with dinosaurs and had long admired the work of Ray Harryhausen, expressed interest in Jurassic Park. After reading the galleys, he committed to direct the film adaptation. He liked the novel's sense of adventure and its scientific explanation for dinosaur resurrection, saying it provided "a really credible look at how dinosaurs might someday be brought back alongside modern mankind".

Crichton was represented by agent Michael Ovitz at Creative Artists Agency. Spielberg recalled that "the agency got ahold of it; and they, of course, encouraged a bidding war, even though Michael had kind of promised me the book privately". Major studios bid for the film rights, each with a director in mind. This included Warner Bros. and Tim Burton, Columbia Pictures and Richard Donner, and 20th Century Fox and Joe Dante. Crichton spoke with each director and endorsed Spielberg as the most likely candidate to get the film made, noting it would be "a very difficult picture" and calling Spielberg "arguably the most experienced and most successful director of these kinds of movies". Universal Pictures, also backing Spielberg as director, acquired the rights on May 15, 1990, less than a week after they were offered for sale and six months before the novel's publication. The film was announced on May 25, 1990.

James Cameron revealed in 2012 that he had tried to purchase the rights, only to discover that Spielberg had acquired them a few hours prior. Cameron said his version of Jurassic Park would have been "much nastier", comparing it with his film Aliens. He realized he was not the right director for Jurassic Park after seeing the finished product, commending Spielberg for making a film which could be enjoyed by children. Dante also praised it, but disagreed with Spielberg's decision to make Hammond more of a protagonist, a departure from the novel.

Storyboards and sketches were already being produced weeks after the rights were acquired. In order to ensure the scenes would work in 3D space, the storyboards were later expanded by Amblin employee Stefan Dechant into simple animatics made with an Amiga 2000 and the Video Toaster. Because of the island setting and abundance of dinosaurs, Spielberg believed it would be advantageous to hire a production designer as soon as possible, choosing Rick Carter about two years before the start of filming. They both read the galleys and held many meetings to discuss which scenes would work best in the film adaptation.

Spielberg, who, as a child, had been fascinated with dinosaurs and had imagined what meeting one would be like, felt that it was important to channel that childlike sense of wonder for the film. Spielberg said that with Jurassic Park, he "was really just trying to make a good sequel to Jaws, on land". He was heavily inspired by King Kong, which he described as a landmark for special effects, and imagined "what it would be like to do a King Kong of today". He cited Hatari! as another inspiration, calling it "the high-water mark of man versus the natural in a feature film". Spielberg described Godzilla, King of the Monsters! as the most masterful dinosaur film of his youth, stating that it made him and viewers believe it was really happening. Although he did not set out to make a dinosaur film better than any others, he did want Jurassic Park to be "the most realistic of them all".

It eventually became clear to Spielberg that Jurassic Park would require more time in development in order to determine the effects needed to create the dinosaurs. He shifted focus to his film Hook, while continuing to monitor progress on Jurassic Park, including script revisions. The art department went on an eight-month hiatus from Jurassic Park to work on Death Becomes Her, another Universal film. After completing Hook, Spielberg wanted Schindler's List to be his next film. Sid Sheinberg, president of Music Corporation of America (Universal's parent company at the time) gave the greenlight to Schindler's List on the condition that Spielberg make Jurassic Park first. Set designs began to be finalized in January 1992; a hotel was among locations at the fictional park that would be cut from the film. The film's budget is disputed; some sources place it at $63 million, while others, including Spielberg, have stated that the budget was $56 million.

Kathleen Kennedy, who co-founded Amblin Entertainment with Spielberg, served as a producer on Jurassic Park alongside Gerald Molen, who had worked with Amblin in the past. Kennedy handled the creative aspects of the project, while Molen managed production-related elements. Dean Cundey, the cinematographer for Hook, rejoined Spielberg for Jurassic Park, signing on to the project relatively late in pre-production. However, he had followed the film's progress through an association with Carter, as both had worked on Death Becomes Her. Cundey described his cinematography as "a realistic, crisp, color-saturated look," aligning with Spielberg's vision for the film. He described the look of the film as "heightened reality", with unrealistically dramatic lighting and imagery, but without diffusion or camera filters. Michael Kahn, Spielberg's longtime film editor, also returned for Jurassic Park.

=== Writing ===
==== Michael Crichton ====
Crichton had mixed feelings about being offered a further $500,000 to write the film adaptation: "I was so tired of the whole area that I didn't really want to do the screenplay. I was sick of Malcolm and I was sick of Grant–and I was even sick of the dinosaurs. But I really felt that I knew the dimensions of the story." Crichton recognized that, by writing the screenplay himself, the project could avoid the same issues he experienced while developing the novel.

Before writing the film, he met several times with Spielberg to discuss which aspects of the book he liked and disliked. Crichton completed his first draft on September 7, 1990, but said "nobody was happy with it at all"; the draft skipped ahead to action rather than building up to it, as in the novel. At Spielberg's suggestion, Crichton rewrote the script in 40-page increments, with the first batch being better received. Crichton was aided by existing storyboards and sketches as he continued to rework the script, with the remaining 80 pages completed on January 19, 1991. Production designer Rick Carter held story meetings with Crichton while he wrote, suggesting ideas for Crichton to implement. Some notable ways Crichton's early drafts differ from the finished film include Hammond initially being less sympathetic and having a much less prominent role and Malcolm lacking a sense of humor.

Crichton had agreed only to write a preliminary version of the film: "I told Steven, 'I'll do a draft for you and cut it down to budgetable size; but then you're going to want somebody else to polish the characters.' I think that sort of surprised him, because writers never say, 'Get somebody else.'" After Crichton's departure, Carter modified Crichton's revised draft, incorporating into it a number of ideas that they had discussed together. Several key elements of the finished film began with Carter's edits, including Hammond recruiting Grant and Sattler, as well as Hammond's general demeanor and the development of his character arc. Meanwhile, the production crew searched for a new writer, considering, among others, playwright Tom Stoppard, who had written the screenplay for Spielberg and Kennedy's film Empire of the Sun.

==== Malia Scotch Marmo ====
During this time, Spielberg was filming Hook, which was co-written by Malia Scotch Marmo and produced by Kennedy. While on the set of Hook, Scotch Marmo was reading the Jurassic Park novel and learned from Kennedy about the film adaptation, accepting an offer to work on its screenplay. Scotch Marmo began writing Jurassic Park in October 1991. She chose to start from scratch, with the novel as her basis, although she did read Crichton's screenplay and consulted with him. Spielberg also agreed to provide her with his own copy of the novel, which contained highlighted aspects of the book that he enjoyed. In addition, she looked at the numerous storyboards produced up to that point.

Scotch Marmo focused on building up the characters "to give them more life and more purpose" than in Crichton's novel and screenplay. She removed Malcolm from the story and tried to incorporate his characteristics into Grant, whom she found to be underdeveloped. She added a romance between Grant and Sattler, an element that was not present in either the novel or Crichton's screenplays. She also sought to emphasize the major themes of the novel, specifically the "fatal flaw of trying to control nature," for instance by showing jungle vegetation creeping into the park's unfinished visitor center: "The idea was that nature was always in the way, always pushing hard against the intrusion." In the novel, Hammond is killed by a pack of Procompsognathus. Both of Crichton's drafts had also included death scenes, with Hammond dying in a similar way as in the novel in the first draft, and, in the second, being killed by Velociraptors at the visitor center theater as his narration in the tour's introductory video plays over his screams. Carter's version had Hammond killed by falling onto a model of the park after being clawed by a raptor. In Scotch Marmo's draft, Hammond chooses to stay behind on Isla Nublar, and then drowns in a puddle, with the film's final shot being a mosquito landing on his arm.

Scotch Marmo spent five months writing her draft and worked closely with Spielberg, noting that their collaboration was unlike most films in which writers "get an assignment, go home, write it and turn it in". She would send him 15 pages at a time, and then would rework them to his liking, sending the revised pages back along with the next 15. She completed her draft on March 14, 1992; Spielberg read it twice and was dissatisfied. She recalled later, "As a writer, that's a terrible feeling. The natural urge is to say: 'Give me another week. I can work it out. I know I can.' But the truth is, sometimes you do hit and sometimes you miss. It's just a shame that it takes so long to find out."

==== David Koepp ====
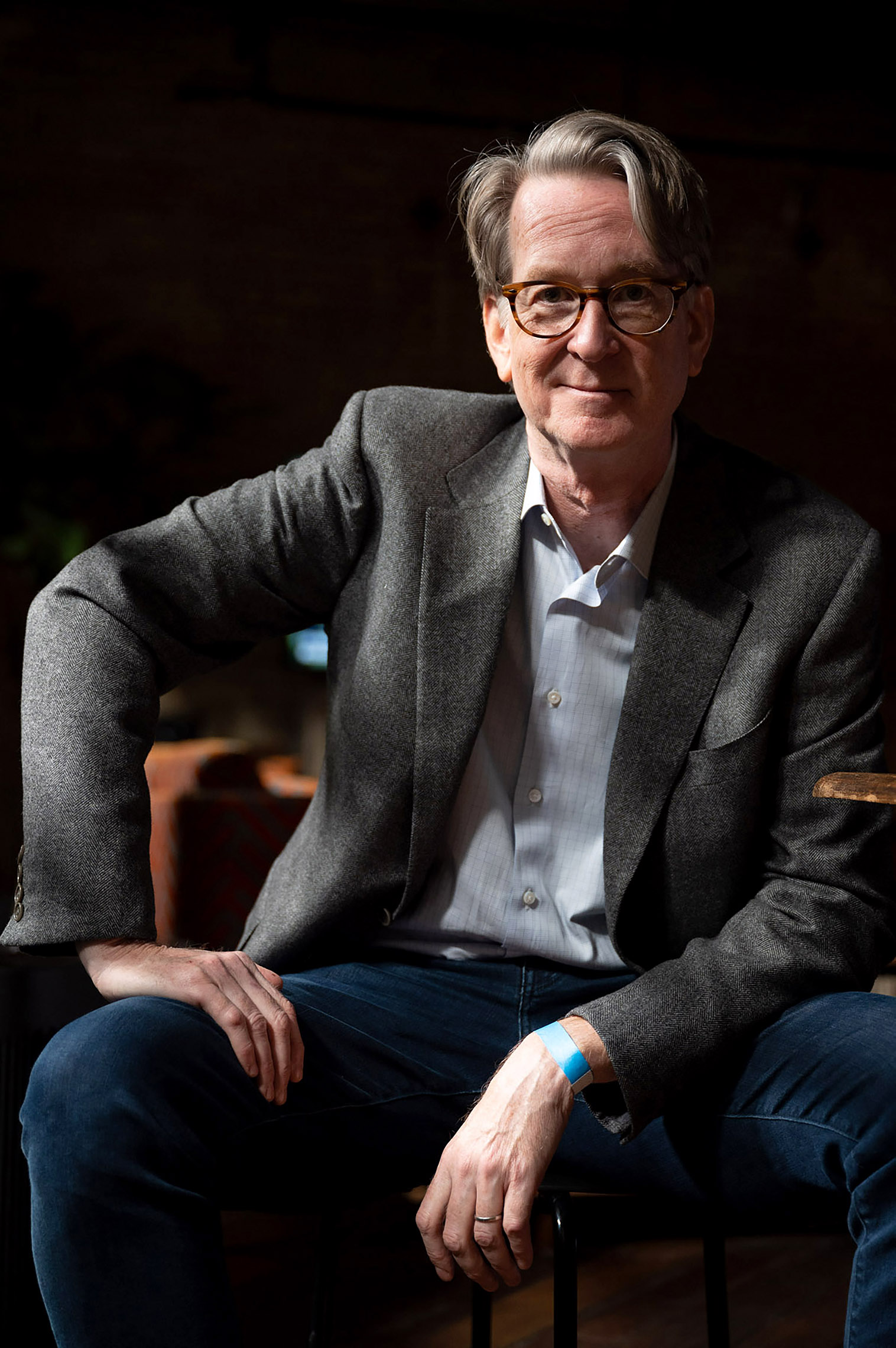
The final drafts of Jurassic Park were written by David Koepp (pictured in 2022)

Spielberg immediately began searching for a new writer, and Universal president Casey Silver recommended David Koepp, who co-wrote Death Becomes Her. Koepp had not read the novel, but quickly obtained a copy, and later discussed the book with Spielberg. Koepp disliked doing rewrites because "it's very hard to get into the mind of somebody else and try to follow what they were doing". Spielberg told Koepp he could start from scratch, allowing his own ideas to fully develop. He read through the novel four times before he began writing the screenplay, and chose not to read the earlier drafts until he finished his own. Two sequences from the novel were mandated: the T. rex attack on a tour vehicle, and the raptors in the kitchen. Otherwise, Koepp was generally allowed to make his own creative choices. Spielberg instructed Koepp to be unconcerned with what technology allowed, so Koepp wrote sequences without knowing if they would be possible to film. He drew from the considerable volume of storyboards and script ideas that had been generated from the film's two-year development process.

Koepp found it difficult to condense the novel's scientific exposition, especially the dialogue that explains how the dinosaurs were created. Spielberg devised an idea to easily convey the cloning process through a short, animated film shown to the park visitors, inspired by the educational television special Hemo the Magnificent. Koepp named the film's cartoon narrator "Mr. DNA", after Spielberg jokingly referred to the character as such. In the same scene, Hammond interacting with the on-screen version of himself is a homage to Gertie the Dinosaur, which was similarly interacted with live by its animator Winsor McCay. Koepp found Malcolm difficult to write due to the character's dialogue being heavy on math and chaos theory; he initially thought to use graphics to visually represent Malcolm's ideas while he talks, an approach inspired by the documentary A Brief History of Time, but Spielberg shot him down, explaining that this approach would break the film's visual style. He decided to solve the problem by removing the character and merging his traits into Grant, just as Scotch Marmo had.

After Koepp finished his first draft in April–May of 1992, Spielberg sent it to Scotch Marmo for her opinion, and she replied with 12 pages of input; these were forwarded to Koepp, who found them helpful. He continued to work closely with Spielberg and with additional feedback from Scotch Marmo. Malcolm was written in at Spielberg's insistence, after Jeff Goldblum auditioned for the film and was deemed perfect for the role. Koepp tried to make the characters interesting by adding moments such as Malcolm flirting with Sattler, leading to Grant's jealousy. Koepp, partially drawing inspiration from Goldblum's casting, made Malcolm into a more comedic character, and also modeled Hammond on Walt Disney and refocused his motivation towards a desire to entertain. Sattler's characterization and dialogue were modified to have feminist qualities through the input of Laura Dern, her actress.

Koepp also tried to avoid excessive character detail because "whenever they started talking about their personal lives, you couldn't care less". He described one scene, in which Sattler and Hammond discuss the park while eating ice cream, as the hardest in the film to write; Spielberg and both actors provided input to the scene, which had to be rewritten 27 times, including during filming. During some scenes, he wrote several dialogue variations to give Spielberg line options to choose from during filming. Drawing inspiration from Spielberg's earlier film Jaws, Koepp kept the T. rex offscreen prior to its breakout scene, instead implying the violence it caused, in order to increase tension. Spielberg suggested modifying that scene so that the T. rex pursues the characters in a Jeep; originally, it only depicted them driving away after hearing the dinosaur's footsteps.

Rewrites continued until just before the start of filming, although Spielberg and Koepp continued revising the script well afterwards. Crichton noted that the final draft differed drastically from his earlier script, but praised the changes and said the new screenplay "seems very compatible with my way of thinking—it fits in my mind". Scotch Marmo did not receive credit for her work.

==== Changes from the novel ====
Crichton said that because the novel was "fairly long," at nearly 400 pages, the film adaptation would only have about 10-20% of its content; scenes were dropped for budgetary and practical reasons, and the violence was toned down. Spielberg said, "What I wanted to do was boil the book down and choose my seven or eight favorite scenes and base the script around those." In a departure from the novel, Spielberg sought to reduce the number of dinosaurs, believing it would not be "physically possible" to make the film otherwise. Koepp said the novel was written "more or less like a movie," making it one of the easier book-to-film adaptations he had worked on. He commented that, like with any adaptation, the most difficult part of his writing assignment was to determine the overall structure of the story. The film was also considerably less graphically violent than the novel. Crichton explained that he had made the novel graphic to force readers to take the dinosaurs seriously, which the film was able to naturally accomplish through the appearance of the dinosaurs, rendering the novel's gore unnecessary. He additionally attributed the film's reduced violence to his view that onscreen graphic violence breaks the audience's suspension of disbelief. Crichton was accepting of changes to his novel, stating that because novels and films were different mediums, changes to the novel sometimes improved the film, and that his goal was not accuracy to the source material, but rather creating the best film possible.

Spielberg removed an early scene in the novel, in which a pack of Procompsognathus kill a baby, as he found it too horrific. A major sequence, present in the novel and the two earlier screenplays, involved the T. rex chasing Grant and Hammond's grandchildren in a raft down a river. Koepp chose not to include this in his script: "I never wanted the raft sequence. It seemed to me that at certain points in the book we were being taken on sort of an obligatory tour past every dinosaur the park had to offer." He said the omission was an easy choice, calling the sequence redundant and noting that it would have been "monstrously expensive" to shoot. Computer-generated imagery would be used to create some of the film's dinosaurs, and the technology's limitations at that time were another factor in removing the raft sequence. Koepp said that "making a T. rex, period, was going to be this enormous challenge. In the early '90s, water was still a big challenge for CG, and so the idea of making a T. rex and then having it swim was a bridge too far." Scenes from the novel that were cut from the film adaptation would gradually be included in sequels, with the raft sequence being featured in Jurassic World Rebirth. Other novel sequences featured in sequels include one set in a pterosaur aviary, which was removed as it did not move the plot along and was repurposed for Jurassic Park III, and another scene involving characters being trapped behind a waterfall by a T. rex, which was adapted in The Lost World: Jurassic Park.

The film's opening changed several times across various drafts of the screenplay. The novel's opening scene involved an injured park worker being brought to a medic by staff, who attempt to cover up that he was attacked by a dinosaur. Crichton's first draft skipped this, jumping straight to Grant and Sattler's introduction in Montana. His revised script opened with a different sequence pulled from the novel, featuring the daughter of a beachgoing family getting attacked by dinosaurs, which later got retooled into the opening of The Lost World. Scotch Marmo's draft began with a shot of blood being extracted from a mosquito encased in amber, followed by Grant and Sattler's introduction. Koepp liked the novel's opening, and used a slightly modified version of it to open his first draft. Spielberg, however, found it too reminiscent of a similar scene in Jaws, so Koepp pivoted the scene to focus on the dinosaur attack itself.

Several characters were modified for the film. Hammond, who was originally a ruthless and greedy businessman in the novel, was rewritten to be sympathetic, as Spielberg related to the character's obsession with showmanship. The ages of Tim and Lex were switched; Spielberg did this because he wanted to work with the younger Joseph Mazzello, and it allowed him to introduce the subplot of Lex's adolescent crush on Grant. For the film, Lex would also take on Tim's interest in computers. In another change, Grant and Sattler are made a couple for the film, adding subtle romance. Koepp changed Grant's relationship with the children, making him initially hostile to them to allow for more character development. This is partly reflected through his relationship with Sattler, who wants them to have children of their own. Following Malcolm's reinsertion into the script, Ed Regis, the park's public relations chief, was cut to avoid overcrowding the film. Regis's cowardly traits, as well as his intended death by being eaten by the T. rex on a toilet, were transferred to Donald Gennaro. Several other characters were reduced to one scene each, including Henry Wu, Dr. Harding, and Dodgson. The name of InGen's corporate rival and Dodgson's employer, Biosyn, is also omitted and was eventually featured in Jurassic World Dominion.

=== Casting ===
Because much of the film's budget was going toward its dinosaur effects, Spielberg sought to cast relatively unknown actors, saying: "Basically, I wanted good, solid actors who weren't going to charge outrageous prices. I didn't want to spend three to five million dollars apiece on actors." Kurt Russell and Richard Dreyfuss were considered for the role of Alan Grant, but were deemed too expensive. William Hurt, Harrison Ford, and Tim Robbins turned down the role, which eventually went to Sam Neill. Laura Dern was cast as Ellie Sattler after Robin Wright and Juliette Binoche turned down offers to play the character. Embeth Davidtz, Gwyneth Paltrow, and Helen Hunt had also auditioned for the role. Spielberg initially compiled a group of young actresses to be considered for Sattler, but Scotch Marmo felt that they were ingénues and wouldn't be realistic for the role of a scientist, instead suggesting Dern, who she felt would be more believable. Despite a 20-year age difference between Neill and Dern, they found their onscreen romance appropriate for the time. Upon reuniting for Jurassic World Dominion, Dern said she was surprised to realize how much of an age gap there is between them.

Casting director Janet Hirshenson felt that Jeff Goldblum was right to play Ian Malcolm after reading the novel, although Jim Carrey also auditioned for the role. According to Hirshenson, Carrey "was terrific, too, but I think pretty quickly we all loved the idea of Jeff". Other actors considered for the part include Tim Curry, Albert Brooks, Fisher Stevens, Barry Miller, Judd Nelson, Kevin Pollak, Timothy Hutton, and Charles Grodin. Richard Attenborough was cast as John Hammond, but was initially hesitant to join the project, which marked his first acting role in 14 years. He eventually signed on at the insistence of Spielberg, who told him, "I can't see anyone else playing it but you". Sean Connery, who Crichton had previously worked with on The First Great Train Robbery, was also a top choice for Hammond, but Connery's fee was too high. Neill, Dern, Goldblum, and Attenborough were cast late in pre-production, with only a few weeks to prepare for their roles. According to Neill, the process "all happened real quick. I hadn't read the book, knew nothing about it, hadn't heard anything about it, and in a matter of weeks I'm working with Spielberg." The start of filming was delayed a month to accommodate Neill's schedule.

Ariana Richards, who plays Lex Murphy, said: "I was called into a casting office, and they just wanted me to scream. I heard later on that Steven had watched a few girls on tape that day, and I was the only one who ended up waking his sleeping wife off the couch, and she came running through the hallway to see if the kids were all right." Christina Ricci also auditioned to play Lex. Joseph Mazzello had screen-tested for a role in Hook, but was deemed too young. Spielberg promised him they would work together on a future film, subsequently casting him for the role of Tim.

Hirshenson, who previously cast Whoopi Goldberg in the film Ghost, had Samuel L. Jackson audition as Ray Arnold after Goldberg noted his performance in the film Jungle Fever. Spielberg and Hirshenson were instantly impressed with Jackson and gave him the role. Spielberg chose Wayne Knight to play Dennis Nedry after seeing him in Basic Instinct; Spielberg only met Knight after he arrived for filming. BD Wong was cast as Dr. Henry Wu, both of Asian descent. He was disappointed by how small the role turned out to be compared with the novel, believing the character's reduced screentime to be the result of racism. Martin Ferrero had auditioned for Donald Gennaro under the assumption that the film's depiction of the character would be similar to the book's portrayal; he was only informed well into the casting process of Gennaro's cowardly disposition and death in the film. Cameron Thor had worked with Spielberg on Hook, and initially auditioned to play Malcolm, before being cast as Dodgson. Molen took on the small role of Dr. Harding. In the novel, Richard Kiley provides the voice of the guide for the park's tour vehicles. For the film, Kiley was cast in the same role, although James Earl Jones was also considered; Jones later hosted the documentary The Making of Jurassic Park.

=== Design ===
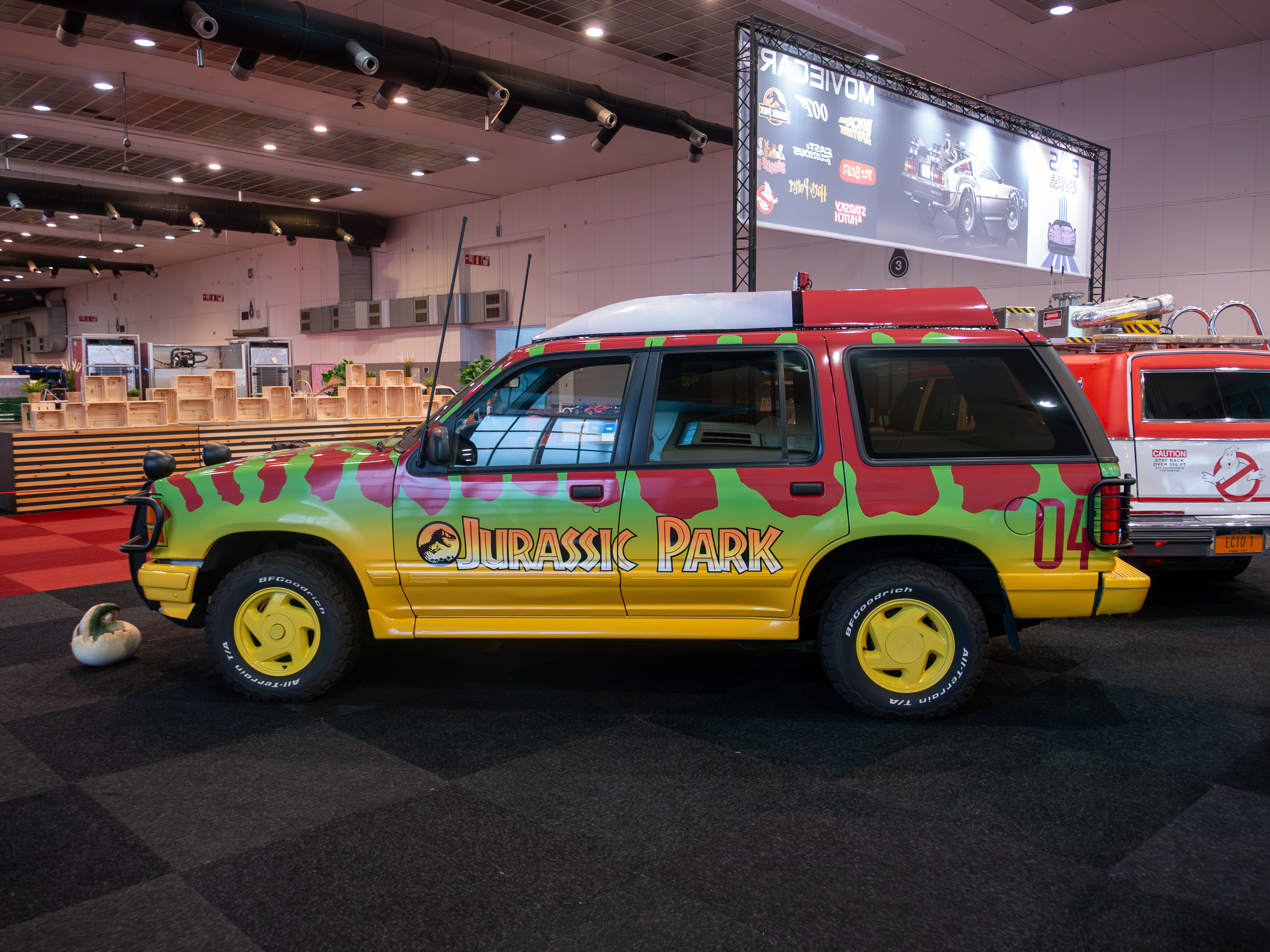
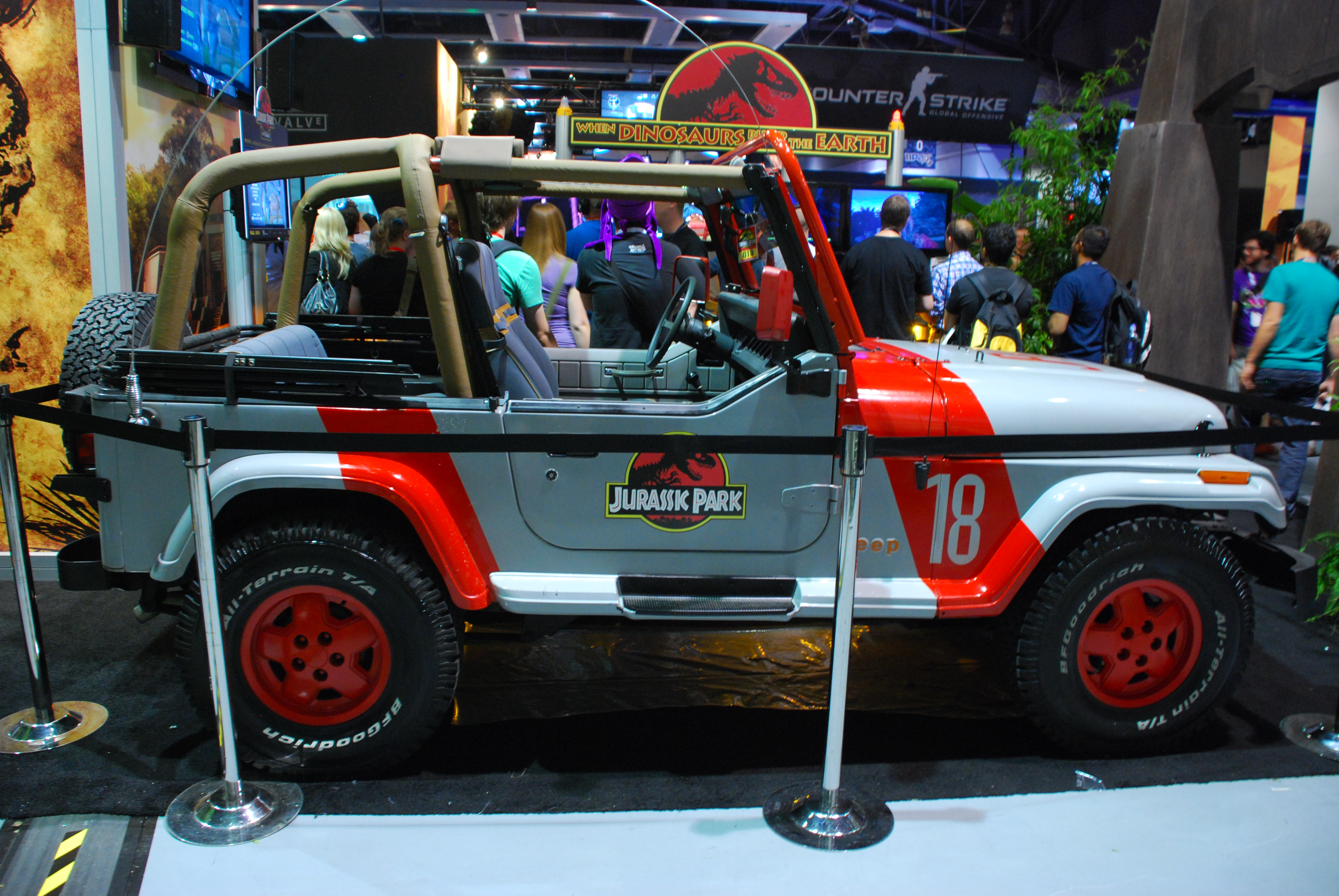
The film features customized Ford Explorers (top) and Jeep Wranglers

Production designer Rick Carter did not want the fictional theme park to have "a lot of commercialized edifices that feel shallow and overly bright and overly energetic. Even though that is something that the park would probably evolve into if it were finished, I thought as a film it would feel shallow. This is, after all, not Disneyland." Carter designed the theme park to incorporate building designs characteristic of the film's setting of Costa Rica. The exterior design of the park's visitor center was loosely based on a Jerusalem temple. The interior design featured a dinosaur theme, including skeletons and a mural, the latter by artist Doug Henderson.

For the control room, set designer Lauren Cory referred to computer environments at several theme parks as well as the Massachusetts Institute of Technology. The set included a wall-mounted 6-by-8-foot (1.8 m × 2.4 m) screen and numerous computers, lent by Apple, Silicon Graphics, Supermac Technologies, and Thinking Machines Corporation, together worth over $1.7 million. Jurassic Park was the first film to have computer screens running on-camera in real time. In previous films, CRT monitors failed to display correctly on film due to technical issues, resulting in computer screens needing to be inserted in post-production. The film crew solved this issue by dropping the refresh rate in the screens displayed in the film to 48 hertz. A second room was built adjacent to the control room, in which a team managed by graphics supervisor Michael Backes controlled the graphics seen on the screens in the control room. A full 3D model of Isla Nublar was created to display on the main projection screen, and Earthwatch, a company that made 3D visualizations for computer stations, provided a hurricane model to use on the projection screen.

The park's vehicles were designed by art director John Bell. The novel has electric-powered Toyota Land Cruisers as the tour vehicles, but Spielberg made a deal with the Ford Motor Company, which provided seven Ford Explorers. They received a custom paint job and a plexiglass roof. Like in the novel, the vehicles are presented as autonomous cars. They travel on a track that, in reality, was non-functional. Industrial Light & Magic, along with veteran customizer George Barris, modified the Explorers to be controlled by drivers hidden in the trunk of the vehicles, with front-mounted cameras allowing them to see the road. Barris also customized the Jeep Wranglers used by the park's workers. For the sequence in which the Explorers are attacked by the T. rex, special effects supervisor Michael Lantieri used a complicated system of cables, winches, and rams to rig the vehicles to essentially crush themselves.

In the film, Dodgson gives Nedry a container, disguised as a can of shaving cream, which is used to transport the stolen dinosaur embryos. According to Bell, the script did not specify a brand of shaving cream, so he browsed at a drug store and eventually chose Barbasol for its distinctive design. In addition, Bell designed prop night vision goggles used by Tim prior to the T. rex breakout, which were in reality nonfunctional.

The decision was made to forgo a costume designer. Instead, Molen brought on the costume supervisors from Hook, who selected ready-to-wear clothing for the cast from various retailers. Malcolm's all-black outfit was an aspect lifted from the novel, and Goldblum added to it by wearing a black leather jacket. Hammond's all-white outfit was meant to evoke him as a sort of religious figure or deity. Their outfits are meant to form a dichotomy, with Malcolm and his dark clothing symbolizing Crichton's cynicism and Hammond and his white clothing symbolizing Spielberg's optimism.

=== Filming ===
==== Hawaii ====
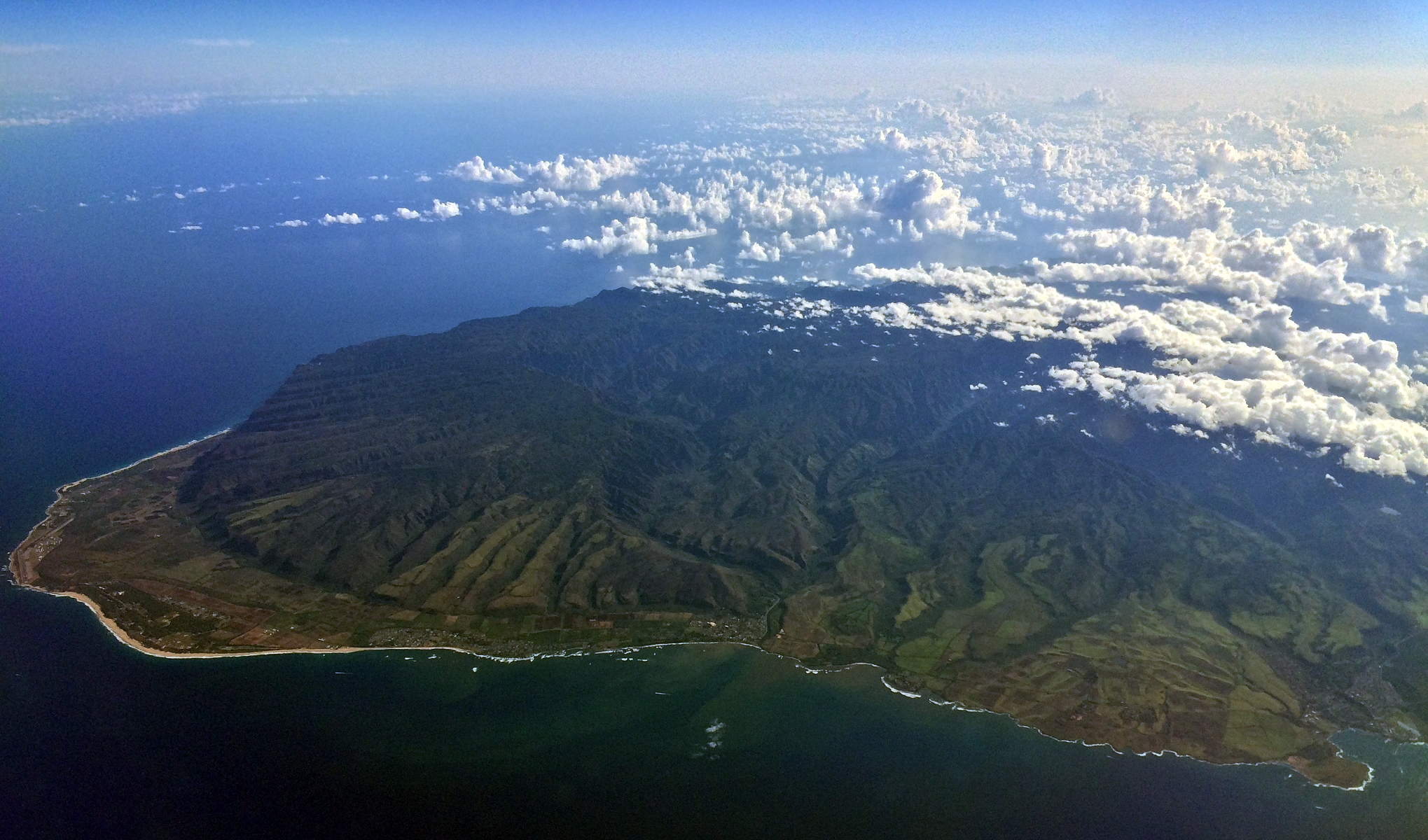
Much of the Hawaiian shoot took place on the island of Kauaʻi, with many of the locations standing in for Isla Nublar

The film's fictional setting of Isla Nublar is located near Costa Rica, which was briefly considered as a filming location early on; this idea was scrapped as production would have occurred during the country's rainy season. Puerto Rico was seriously considered as well, until Spielberg settled on Kauaʻi, Hawaii. He attributed this decision to his age: "Had I been twenty-six instead of forty-five, I might have gone to Yucatan or the Philippines or Costa Rica–someplace really rugged." He also liked the idea of "staying in a nice Hawaiian hotel with room service and a pool", while stating that the tropical landscapes were as good as, or better than, the alternative sites. In addition, Spielberg was familiar with Hawaii, having filmed there in the past, and was concerned about infrastructure and accessibility at the other locations. Set construction began in early June 1992, nearly three months before the start of filming. Some of the locations were remote and only accessible with off-road vehicles.

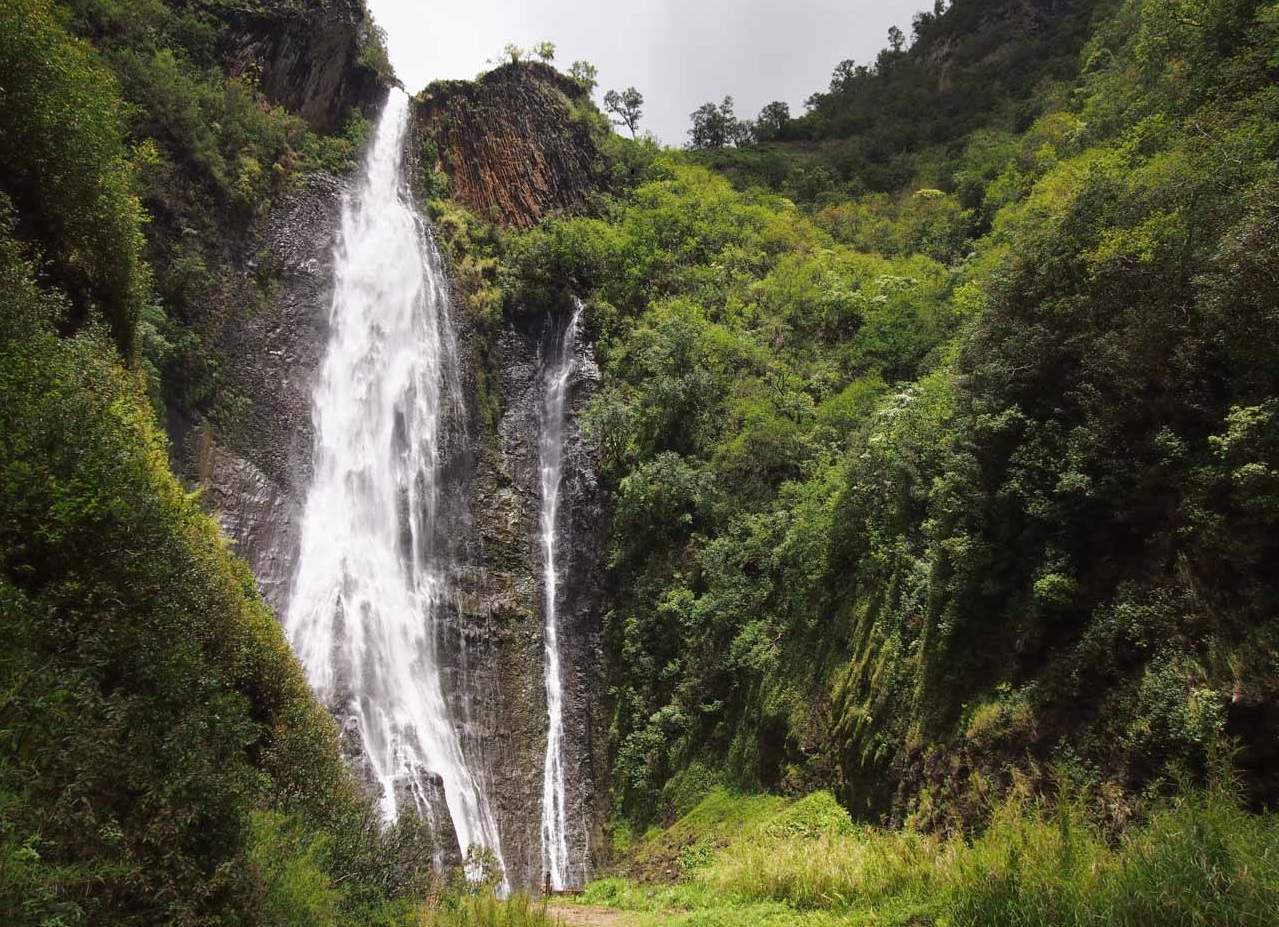
Scenes involving Isla Nublar's helipad were shot at Mānāwaiopuna Falls

After 25 months of pre-production, filming began on August 24, 1992, at Olokele Canyon. Richards and Mazzello attended school during filming, and Spielberg would sometimes pull Mazzello, who had expressed interest in directing, out of classes to give him lessons about the profession. The three-week Kauaʻi shoot was focused on exterior scenes, many of them set on Isla Nublar during daytime. Spontaneous cloud coverage occurred frequently, necessitating the use of lighting and film exposure tricks in order to match with previously shot footage. Scenes of the park's visitors arriving and departing Isla Nublar, via helicopter, were filmed at Mānāwaiopuna Falls, which became commonly known as Jurassic Falls after the film's release. Keōpuka Rock, alternatively known as Jurassic Rock, was used for an early shot of the helicopter as it approaches Isla Nublar. The rock is located near the island of Maui, but filming otherwise continued on Kauaʻi.

The exterior of the Jurassic Park visitor center was built on the grounds of the Valley House Plantation Estate. It was constructed as a 60-foot (18 m) high facade, nearly 200 feet (61 m) in length. A Jurassic Park gate, marking the start of the theme park tour, was built at the base of Mount Waiʻaleʻale.

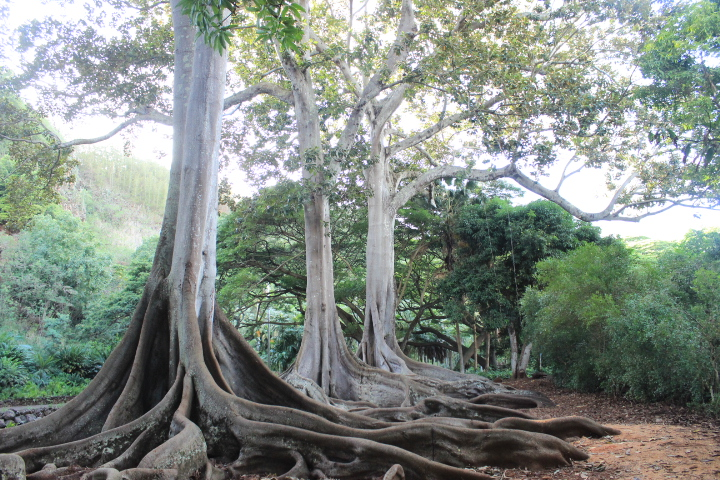
Trees at Allerton Garden, used for a scene involving a dinosaur nest

An early scene, set at an amber mine in the Dominican Republic, was filmed near Hoʻopiʻi Falls. A meeting between Nedry and Dodgson was shot in Kapaʻa, standing in for San José, Costa Rica. The raptor enclosure set was built at Limahuli Garden and Preserve, operated by the National Tropical Botanical Garden (NTBG). Allerton Garden, another NTBG property, was used in two instances: a set depicting the maintenance shed exterior, and a scene in which Grant discovers a dinosaur nest and realizes the animals are breeding.

Towering fences, standing 24 feet (7.3 m), were among the on-site construction work, representing the electrified perimeters of the T. rex enclosure during daytime scenes. Despite the simple design of the fencing, the project proved to be one of the most difficult for the production crew, as one of the filming sites was the remote Olokele Canyon. Lantieri said the crew "had to haul all of this steel up there, drill holes like you would for telephone poles, pour concrete, and then pull all of the cables, which were three-quarter-inch aluminum with steel in the middle".

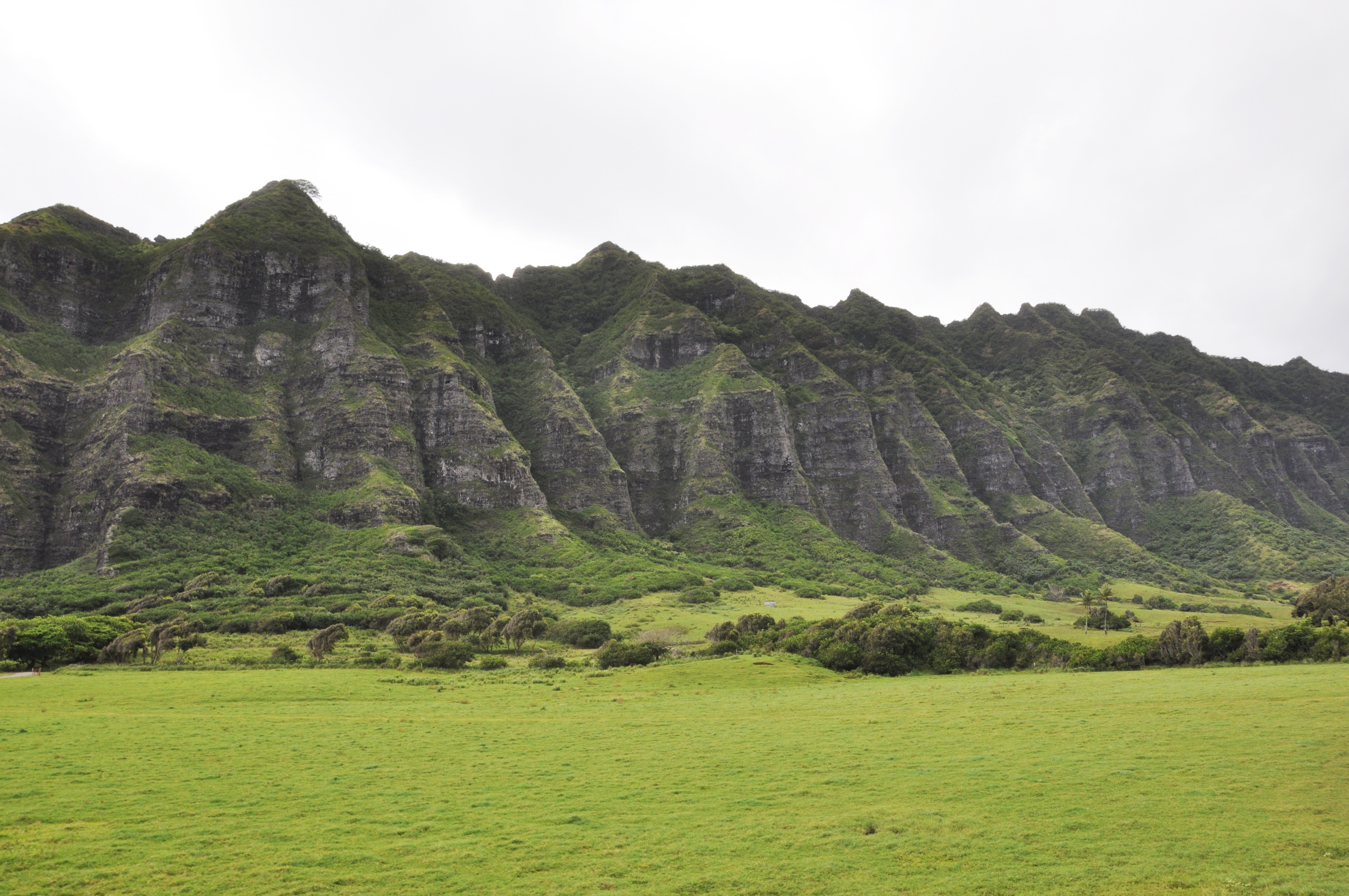
Kualoa Ranch on Oʻahu, where the Gallimimus scene was filmed

The longest stretch of fence measured over 200 feet (61 m), and more than 6 miles (9.7 km) of cable were used in total. Spielberg wanted to avoid sagging in the cables, so the crew hired workers from a local company that was experienced with power lines. Lantieri called the project "an enormous job—and for very little payoff. People will look at the movie and say, 'Oh, there's a fence,' never realizing what it took to get it there." The canyon location was used for a scene in which Grant and the children, on their way to the visitor center, must climb over the fence to proceed.

On September 11, 1992, the last scheduled day of the Kauaʻi shoot, Hurricane Iniki passed directly over the island. The cast and crew found out too late about the impending hurricane and took shelter at their hotel. Spielberg and a small crew ventured outside during the hurricane to capture brief footage, used in the film to depict the storm that hits Isla Nublar. A scene depicting a Gallimimus herd was to be shot on Kauaʻi, but the island was ravaged by the hurricane. The scene was instead filmed two weeks later at Kualoa Ranch, located on the island of Oʻahu. With its high cliffs, the ranch was considered more attractive than the empty plain that was originally planned for the scene. The hurricane also prevented an onscreen death for Ray Arnold, who was supposed to be chased down and killed by a Velociraptor; in the final film, he dies offscreen. Despite the hurricane, the Hawaiian shoot came in essentially on budget and on schedule.

==== California ====
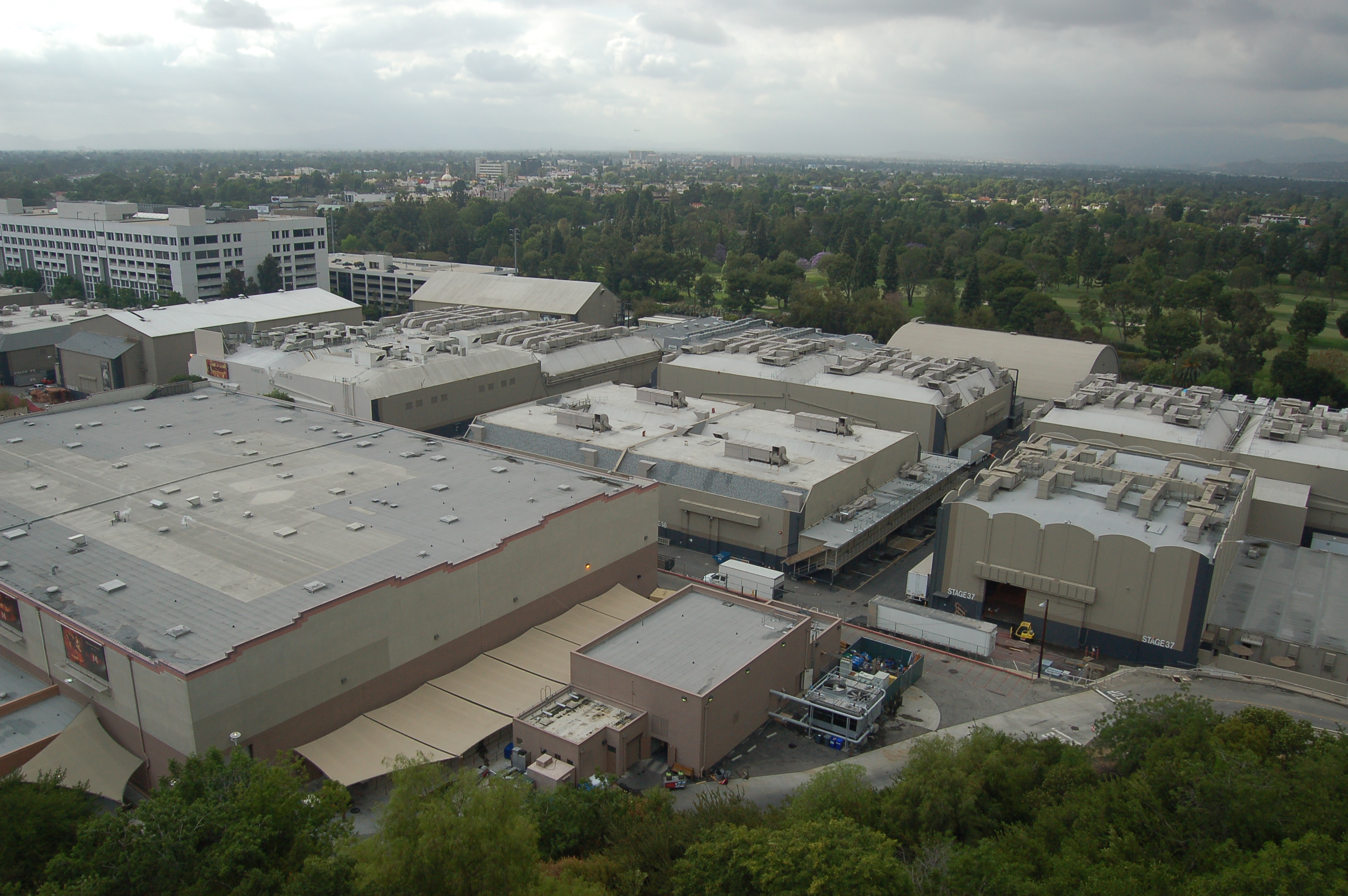
Most of the filming in California occurred on sound stages, primarily at the Universal Studios Lot

By September 15, 1992, the cast and crew had moved to California, where the remainder of filming was scheduled to take place, primarily on sound stages. The majority of stage shooting occurred at the Universal Studios Lot in the Los Angeles area. Among the first sets to be used there was an industrial-sized kitchen, for when the raptors stalk Lex and Tim. The set was built on Stage 24, and took inspiration from the Overlook Hotel kitchen in The Shining. Because the kitchen was filled with reflective surfaces, Cundey had to carefully plan the illumination while also using black cloths to hide the light reflections. The sequence was filmed over two weeks.

Filming moved to Stage 23 for scenes involving the maintenance shed interior, before moving to Red Rock Canyon, which stood in as Grant's paleontological dig site. The filmmakers originally planned to shoot in Montana, where the scene is set, but this was scrapped to save time and money. Jack Horner, the film's paleontological advisor, was consulted to ensure an accurate representation of a dig site, although some aspects of the dig were changed due to artistic license. Other paleontologists have found the scene to be overly simplified and unrealistic.

Filming continued to progress ahead of schedule, with Spielberg crediting the project's extensive use of storyboards; every action sequence in the film had been storyboarded almost two years prior to the start of filming, and Spielberg tightly followed the storyboards when shooting the sequences. Back at Universal, Stage 27 was decorated with real and synthetic jungle vegetation for various scenes. The stage was used initially to depict Grant helping Tim out of a tour vehicle, after it has been shoved over a cliff by the T. rex and into a tree. Upon retrieving Tim, the vehicle begins to drop through the tree foliage, forcing the humans to quickly descend before being crushed. This was one of the most challenging scenes to shoot and required the creation of a 50-foot (15 m) artificial tree, made of steel, with the vehicle dropped down the tree multiple times to acquire the needed footage. Spielberg wanted the tree to appear three times taller than it actually was, so three sides were each decorated to represent a different portion of the vehicle drop. The same steel structure was then redressed to serve as a different tree, for a scene in which Grant and the children take refuge and encounter a Brachiosaurus. Stage 28 was used for scenes taking place in the park's control room and laboratory. Over the course of a day, Wong shot his scene on the latter set, which was decorated by laboratory technician Ron Rogge to look like an authentic molecular biology laboratory.

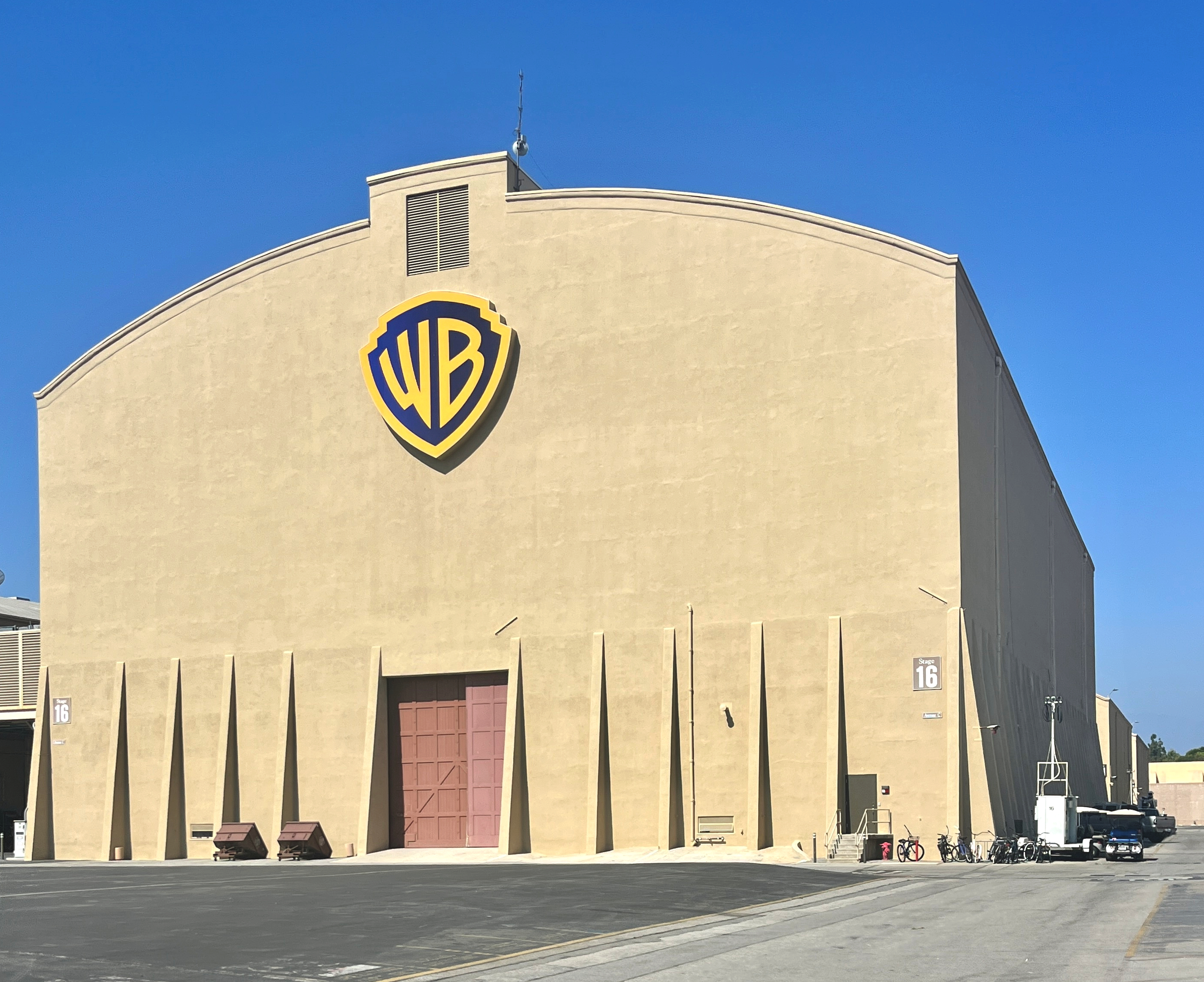
Stage 16 at Warner Bros. Studios was used for the T. rex breakout sequence

Universal lacked a stage large enough to accommodate the T. rex breakout set, which was instead filmed on Stage 16 at Warner Bros. Studios, located nearby. Filming began there on October 27, 1992, with the stage decorated to match the Hawaii footage. The sequence is set at night during a storm, and the stage included rain machines and mud, making the shoot wet and messy for the cast and crew. Spielberg anticipated that the sequence could be the most difficult of the film, due to the rain machines and the logistics of using a life-sized T. rex animatronic. Complications arose when the T. rex began to shake and quiver from extra weight, as the dinosaur's foam rubber skin had absorbed a significant amount of the rainwater. Crew members had to dry the model with shammies between takes. The animatronic was so heavy that it was effectively impossible to move, so when the T. rex was supposed to move within the scene, the crew instead shifted the whole set around the animatronic to give the appearance that the T. rex was in a different place.

During the scene where the T. rex attacks a tour vehicle, the animatronic hit the vehicle's plexiglass roof with more force than intended, and one of its teeth came out; it was so difficult to reinsert that Spielberg decided to continue shooting without it, resulting in the T. rex having a missing tooth in the final film. The sequence in the novel had included the T. rex lifting a vehicle in its mouth and then throwing it, which was removed because Tyrannosaurus rex was not large enough for such a thing to be possible. Instead, Spielberg had the T. rex headbutt the vehicle, which was inspired by Hatari!. The behaviors of the T. rex were modeled on real predators in order to make it feel more lifelike. The way it rips through the back of a tour vehicle trying to get to Lex and Tim was patterned after a cat ripping into a mouse, and the scene was written to continue with the dinosaur trying to drag the car back to its lair, which was cut for being too creepy. It was decided on-set that the T. rex would eat Gennaro onscreen; the initial plan was for him to be pulled out of frame and killed, but this was changed when the filmmakers realized that the T. rex did not eat anybody in the film. Unlike in monster films such as Godzilla, where the camera tends to be higher to show off the monster, the sequence was shot entirely at ground level, as Spielberg wanted the audience to see the T. rex from the point of view of the characters.

An early shot in the sequence focuses on the dashboard of one of the vehicles, with ripples forming in a glass of water, caused by the footsteps of the approaching T. rex. This was inspired by Spielberg listening to Earth, Wind & Fire in his car, and the vibrations the bass rhythm caused. Lantieri was unsure how to create the shot until the night before filming when he put a glass of water on his guitar, which achieved the concentric circles in the water that Spielberg wanted. The next morning, guitar strings were run through the car, and a man on the floor plucked them to achieve the effect. Like Gennaro, Malcolm was originally scripted to flee in fear from the T. rex. This was changed with an on-set suggestion by Goldblum, who felt that heroic action was better. Instead, the scene features Malcolm using a flare to distract the dinosaur, allowing Grant to retrieve the children from the wrecked tour vehicle.

The Warner Bros. set included the cliff that the T. rex shoves the vehicle over. Koepp questioned the set design, which created an apparent inconsistency, as the cliff would appear seemingly where the dinosaur had broken out: "I asked Steven, 'Don't you think people are going to notice that suddenly there's this cliff?' And he looked at me like I was from another planet and pointed at the great big robot of the T. rex and said, 'There's a T. rex! They're not gonna notice anything else but that!' And he was right." Also filmed at Warner Bros. was the T. rex's pursuit of a Jeep. Returning to Universal, the filmmakers shot scenes involving the deaths of Nedry and Muldoon, both on Stage 27; this location and Stage 16 were the only sound stages used for exterior scenes.

The film was initially written to end with Grant using a crane to maneuver one raptor into the jaws of a fossil tyrannosaur and Hammond shooting the other one with a rocket launcher, while the T. rex was set to be killed off earlier in the film. However, the T. rex sequence at Warner Bros., shot weeks before the end of filming, made Spielberg realize the dinosaur was the main star of Jurassic Park. He felt that audiences would be disappointed if the T. rex did not make a final appearance, and had the ending changed so the dinosaur faces off against multiple raptors in the visitor center, inadvertently saving the humans. Afterward, the T. rex makes what Spielberg described as a "King Kong-esque roar" while a banner reading "When Dinosaurs Ruled the Earth" falls. Because the T. rex animatronic was enormously heavy, and the visitor center set had not been built to accommodate it, the T. rex in the ending sequence had to be digitally rendered. The visitor center interior was constructed on Stage 12 at Universal. Cundey shot the finale with wide lenses to show off as much of the set as possible, but this also made the placing of on-set lights a "painstaking" process.

In the film, a pair of dinosaur skeletons hang from the ceiling, and break apart when a Velociraptor crashes into them. Molds for the bones were provided by Research Casting International, a company that provided molds for museum displays, and the skeletons were constructed by Lantieri's team. They had to determine how the Velociraptor would crash into the display, and how each part of the skeleton collapsing would impact the other parts. The bones were prescored in order to create weak points so that the skeleton would break into predictable sections. The display was held together by cables and pneumatic rams, which could be released sequentially in order to make specific parts of the skeletons collapse in order. Everything was very carefully timed in order to ensure that the collapse would go exactly as planned. Lantieri described it as being "very much like dance choreography" and said that it was extremely challenging, partially because the disassembling had to be achieved in one take.

According to assistant director John T. Kretchmer, the final scene to be filmed was a retake of a shot in the scene where Hammond meets Grant and Sattler. Spielberg, who rarely used more than seven takes, retook that shot about sixteen times, explaining to Kretchmer that he loved filming the movie and did not want to stop. Jurassic Park wrapped under budget and 12 days ahead of schedule on November 30, 1992. Spielberg, who described prior experiences with overrun schedules as a driving factor in his determination to finish the film on schedule and on budget, compromised on additional takes to ensure this would happen.

=== Dinosaurs on screen ===
For Jurassic Park, Spielberg sought to go beyond a simple monster movie, with Carter stating that they "tried to find the animal in the dinosaur as opposed to the monster in the dinosaur. The idea was not to make them any less threatening, but rather to keep them from doing as much 'monster schtick.'" Underscoring this point, Spielberg banned the words "monster" and "creature" on set, forcing the crew to refer to the dinosaurs as "animals" instead. Spielberg hired paleontologist Jack Horner to ensure that the dinosaurs would be designed and portrayed accurately, based on then-current knowledge of the animals. Certain concepts about dinosaurs were followed, like the theory that they evolved into birds and were not related to reptiles; Horner was a strong advocate for the theory, which was not widely accepted at the time. This prompted the removal of the raptors' flicking tongues in early animatics, as Horner complained it was implausible; his suggestion for a replacement shot, the kitchen door window fogging up as a raptor breathes on it, emphasized that the raptors were warm-blooded like birds but unlike reptiles. Horner accepted that some artistic license would be used, stating that "if I could demonstrate that something was true or not true, then he would go with that, but if I had some question about it and we didn’t really have much evidence about it, he would go with whatever he thought would make the best movie".

Despite the film title's referencing the Jurassic period, Brachiosaurus and Dilophosaurus are the only dinosaurs featured that lived during that time; the other species in the film did not exist until the Cretaceous. The latter period is mentioned early in the film when Grant describes the ferocity of Velociraptor to a young boy, saying: "Try to imagine yourself in the Cretaceous period".

==== Effects ====
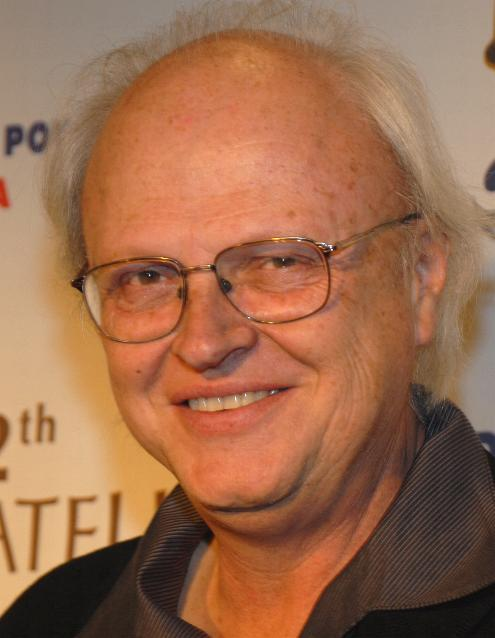
Dennis Muren (pictured in 2007) oversaw the computer-generated dinosaurs created by Industrial Light & Magic (ILM)

The dinosaurs were created through various methods, including animatronics and computer-generated imagery (CGI). Spielberg sought to use full-scale dinosaurs on-set as much as possible, rather than relying on stop motion, a post-production method commonly used in dinosaur films up to that point. He knew, early on, that stop motion would still be needed for wide shots of the dinosaurs. To help create the dinosaurs, Spielberg consulted and worked closely with Dennis Muren, an effects supervisor at Industrial Light & Magic (ILM), which had already provided effects for several of his films. Spielberg hired Phil Tippett, who had previously created stop-motion dinosaur effects for the short film Prehistoric Beast and the documentary film Dinosaur!, to create the dinosaur wide shots using go motion, a variation of stop motion, with ILM set to refine his work through compositing and adding motion blur. Tippett was hired very early in production, prior to the publication of Crichton's novel, and gave input to Spielberg and Koepp during the development of the script, providing them with guidance on dinosaur accuracy as well as what was possible to film based upon his effects experience and knowledge of dinosaurs. Also hired early in production was special effects supervisor Michael Lantieri, who was heavily involved with determining how to create full-sized dinosaurs.

Early on, Spielberg thought of hiring ride designer Bob Gurr to create the full-scale dinosaurs, having been impressed by his work on a giant mechanical King Kong, made for the King Kong Encounter at Universal Studios Hollywood. Upon reflection, Spielberg felt that Gurr's life-sized robots would be too expensive and unconvincing. The crew also considered Dinamation, as well as Jim Henson's Creature Shop, for the creation of full-size dinosaurs. Spielberg then contacted effects artist Stan Winston, having seen his work on the Alien Queen in Aliens. Winston said the Queen was easy compared to a dinosaur animatronic, because it was lightweight and did not have to look like a real animal. A decade earlier, Winston had declined to work on Spielberg's E.T. the Extra-Terrestrial, which was a decision he regretted. As a result, despite not having any idea if it was possible for his team to build animatronic dinosaurs, Winston agreed to work on the film. This was not an official contract, however, as Universal had not yet greenlit Jurassic Park.

Mark "Crash" McCreery, one of Winston's artists, created numerous dinosaur sketches over the course of about a year, focusing particularly on scientific accuracy. These impressed Universal, which eventually hired Winston's team to make the film's on-set dinosaurs. Winston and ILM also worked together on Terminator 2: Judgment Day. As with previous films, Winston's workers consisted of two groups: the art department, responsible in this case for the dinosaurs' outer appearance; and the mechanical department, which would handle the technical inner workings. The design for the appearance of the dinosaurs was most strongly influenced by the artwork of paleoartist John Gurche. Every dinosaur in the film was designed by Winston's crew, including the ones that were not filmed with animatronics. Animatronics were created of the Brachiosaurus, Dilophosaurus, Triceratops, T. rex, and Velociraptor, as well as the Velociraptor hatchling. Winston's crew created fully detailed fifth-scale models of the dinosaurs and cut them into cross-sections, then expanded each cross-section to full size versions made of plywood, fiberglass, Roma clay, and hardware cloth, which were then assembled onto a robotic frame. The animatronics then underwent final sculpting, and latex skin was fitted on.

Sound stages were considered the most ideal filming environment for the animatronics, allowing sets to be built on elevated platforms with the mechanics of the dinosaurs concealed underneath. Those mechanics, described as "dinosaur interfaces," were built by Lantieri's team to allow for the creatures to have a broad range of movement, with rigs that would accommodate Winston's puppeteers, pneumatics, and underground cranes and dollies. Lantieri's team quickly discovered that jungle sets were comparatively easy to hide interfaces in, as foliage was able to conceal equipment, while indoor sets had fewer hiding spots. The most difficult set to incorporate dinosaur interfaces into was the kitchen set, as so much of the set was visible in the shots; the problem was eventually solved by hiding rods in the floor and countertops, as well as building a harness system for the Velociraptors and a dolly system underneath the floor. As Winston's crew had to be on set during filming in order to operate the animatronics, they were classified as actors and joined the Screen Actors Guild.

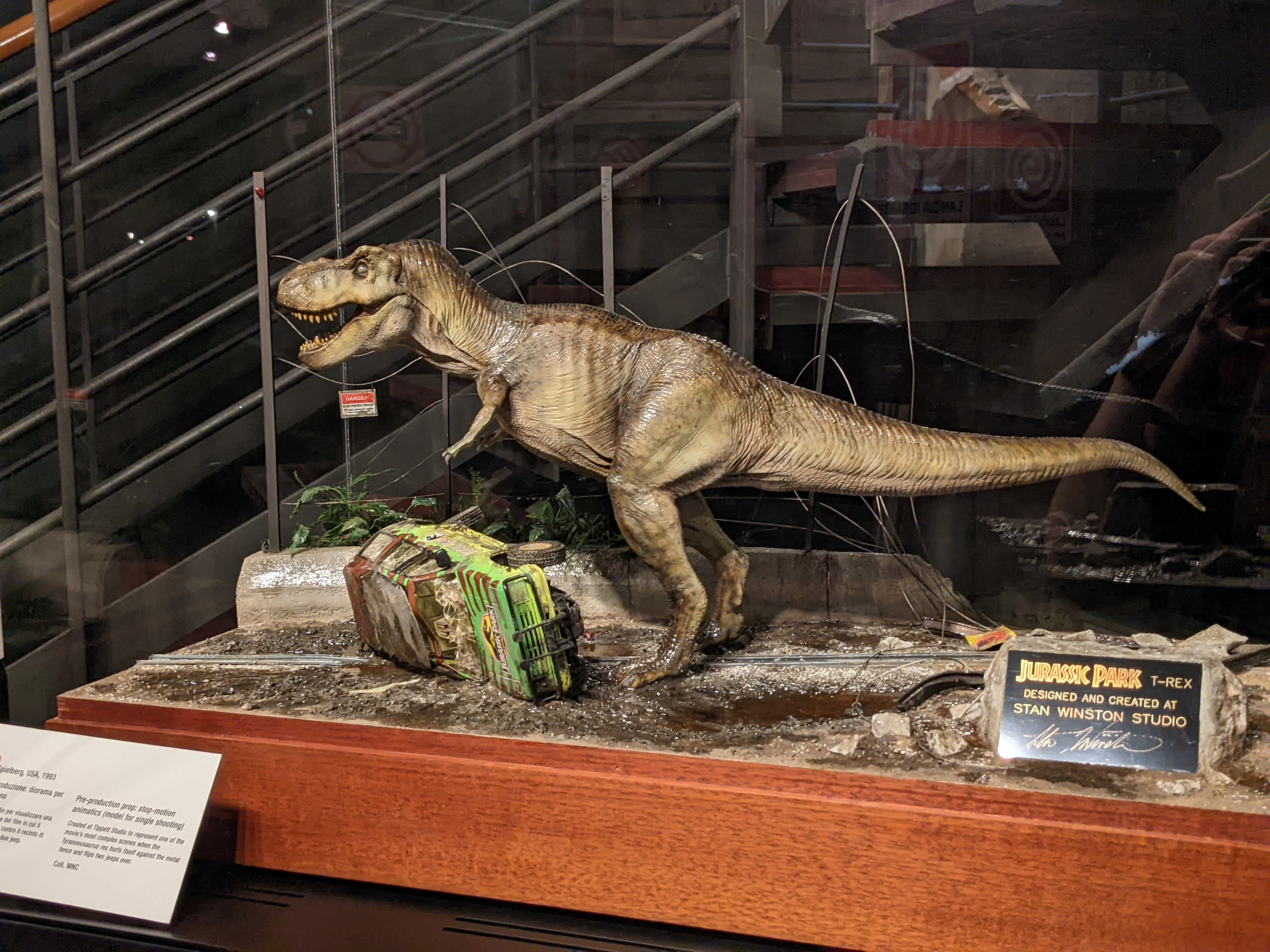
A pre-production T. rex model, displayed at the National Museum of Cinema of Turin, Italy

In addition to wide shots, Tippett was tasked with creating go motion animatics early on to help develop two major sequences: one depicting the T. rex breakout, and the other involving the raptors in the kitchen. His team built the dinosaur puppets out of foam rubber and based their design on maquettes made by Winston. Despite go motion's attempts at motion blurs, Spielberg found the end results unsatisfactory for a live-action feature film. He wanted to include a stampede of dinosaur herds, but was unsure how to achieve this. After breaking new ground with the CGI effects in Terminator 2, Muren thought ILM could handle the stampede rather than Tippett: "Creating herds of animals with puppets would be very difficult, so I thought maybe that was something we might be able to do with computer graphics."

ILM animator Steve Williams believed that more could be done with CGI than just the stampede: "All of us wanted a crack at the T-rex, but we thought we could never get it because Stan was already in there, and so was Phil. But the attraction was strong, so I secretly started building some T-rex bones in the computer." Williams scanned the schematics of a T. rex skeleton at the Royal Tyrrell Museum of Palaeontology to create his virtual skeleton and then animated a walk cycle for it. Fellow animator Mark Dippé also believed that CGI could be used for the film on a large scale, pushing Muren for months to consider the possibility. Muren was hesitant to commit to creating additional CGI dinosaurs because he was concerned about ILM's ability to produce the unprecedented effects within the film's production timeline, and because the production had already committed to the use of animatronics and stop motion. Muren, Kennedy and Molen were impressed when Williams unveiled his skeleton animation, and Muren was given approval to explore the use of CGI for the herd shots.

The T. rex animation was examined further. Winston's fifth-scale prototype of the dinosaur was scanned by Cyberware, and the data was refined with various computer programs to fit over the skeleton, creating a digital T. rex. The model was lit by Stefen Fangmeier and animated by Williams using programs such as Sock, with the finished result impressing Spielberg so much that he scrapped the go motion method, instead tasking ILM with creating digital dinosaurs for full-body shots. Spielberg likened viewing the test to "watching our future unfolding on the TV screen, so authentic I couldn't believe my eyes". Upon seeing the T. rex animation, Tippett had declared, "I think I'm extinct." Spielberg had this incorporated into the script: Grant, impressed by Jurassic Park's living dinosaurs, says to Sattler, "We're out of a job," to which Malcolm replies, "Don't you mean extinct?"

Tippett had assembled a 30-person crew to prepare for the go motion segments; Spielberg did not wish to lose his expertise, and Muren sought to keep him involved with the project as an advisor to ILM's animators. Muren later noted that "this is the first generation of computer animators, and they are struggling with hardware and software limitations that make the process excruciatingly painful and slow". Although Tippett disliked computers, Muren eventually convinced him to remain involved on Jurassic Park. Tippett and the ILM team spent approximately a month learning each other's respective fields.

Tippett, who was also an amateur paleontologist, acted as a consultant for dinosaur anatomy and movement, and his animatics were used, along with storyboards, as a reference for what would be shot during the action sequences, as a guide for the movements of Winston's animatronics, and to help the actors visualize the dinosaurs that would be in the sequence. ILM's artists were sent on private tours to zoos, marine exhibits, and a local animal park, so they could study large animals – rhinos, elephants, alligators, and giraffes – up close. They also took classes in mime, dance, movement, and stop-motion to aid in understanding movements. Tippett also spent a week working with sound designer Gary Rydstrom on dinosaur vocals. The design team also watched previous films that featured dinosaurs, including King Kong, Fantasia, and the work of Ray Harryhausen in order to see how dinosaurs had been portrayed in the past and determine what they wanted to improve upon. A "movement bible" was developed, which contained information about the dinosaurs' movements and character traits.

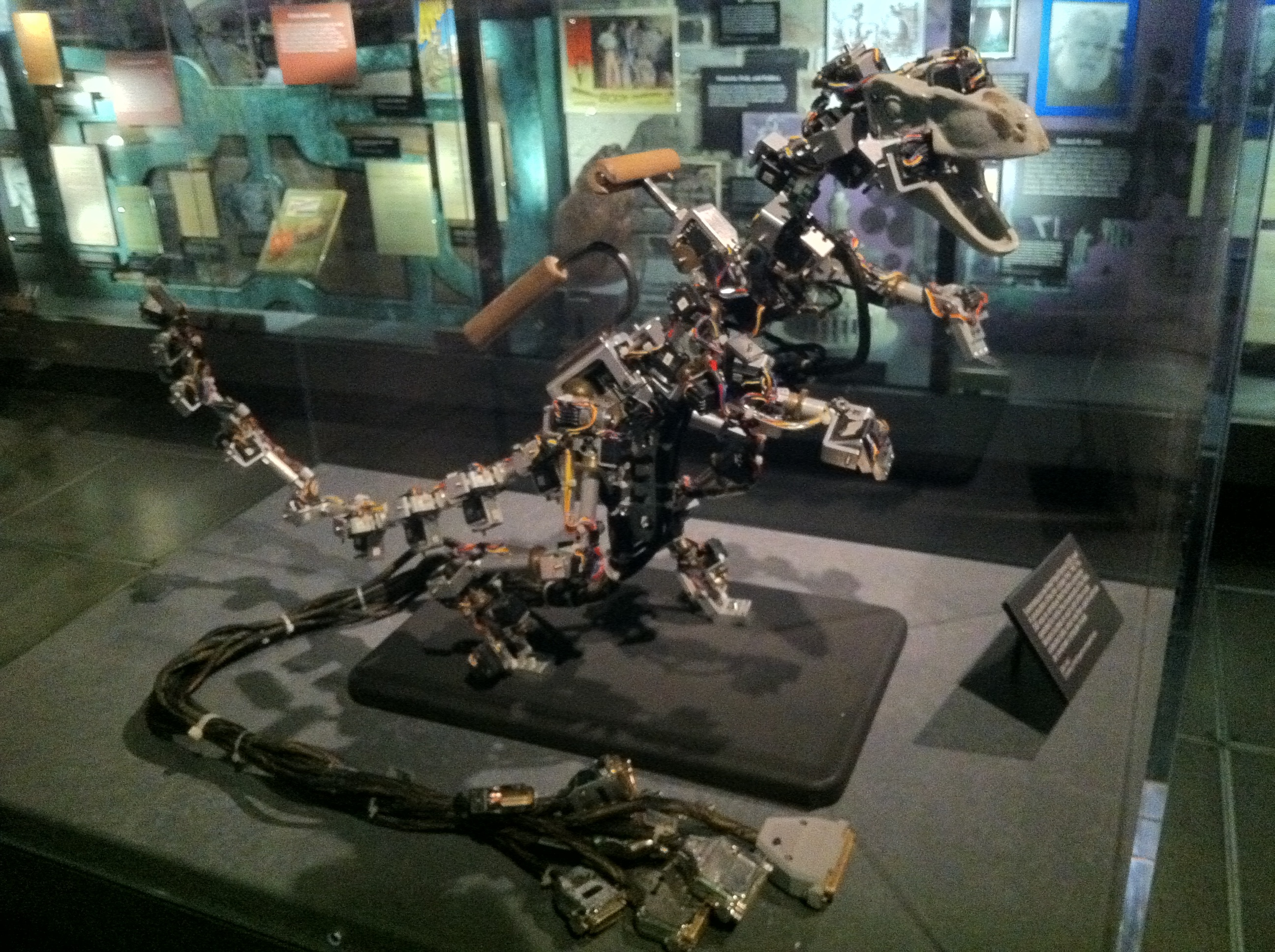
The "Dinosaur Input Device" raptor used for the film

In an effects test, the T. rex model displayed an issue with unusually jerky movement, which ILM's animators were unable to fix. To solve this, Tippett Studio and ILM created Dinosaur Input Devices, which were armatures with motion encoders that fed information into computers, allowing Tippett Studio artists Randal M. Dutra and Tom St. Amand to animate wire-frame models of the dinosaurs like stop-motion puppets. St. Amand and Bart Trickel built two Velociraptor armatures and two T. rex armatures, each about 3 feet (0.91 m) long and made of aircraft aluminum in order to be as light as possible. All of the encoders, which were placed at the joints of the armatures, transmitted data through wires to a controller box, which converted the sensor signals into computer input. This logged the movement as key frames through Pixar's RenderMan software, which ILM animators then smoothed and refined to make the movement more realistic. The movement was then applied to a full digital dinosaur model, which was created by laser scanning Winston's fifth-scale models. The creation of the devices was supervised by Thomas A. Williams, as Tippett Studio artist Craig Hayes designed the armatures, Pixar's Rick Sayre built the controller box, and Brian Knep designed the computer software. The software was made to be very easy to use, as most Tippett Studio artists had very limited computer experience. The development of the devices took about four months, of which two months were spent prototyping and a further 6–8 weeks was spent building the final armatures. Rough replicas of the sets were created in both the computer and physically, in miniature, in order to simulate the interaction of the dinosaurs with their environment. The stop-motion animators planned the movement of the dinosaurs by manually posing every few frames and allowing the computer to link the frames together. However, for the final shots, every frame was hand-animated, as the computer-generated motion between key frames looked unnaturally smooth. A total of 15 CGI shots, including eight of the eleven CGI shots in the T. rex escape sequence and a further seven shots in the kitchen sequence, made use of the devices, while the film's other 37 CGI shots had the motion animated directly on the dinosaur models using Softimage 3D and Alias software. The artists then used a newly developed program called Viewpaint to paint texture maps onto the models, providing color and texture to the dinosaurs. Enveloping, a program ILM built for the purpose of enhancing the dinosaur animation, allowed the animators to realistically simulate the movement of skin over the underlying bones and muscles. The dinosaurs were incorporated into the live-action footage using multiple tools, including placing green tennis balls and glow sticks as reference points for match moving through SoftImage to allow free camera movement, digital rotoscoping using Matador, and compositing, which included inserting digital blur, film grain, camera movement, camera bounce, and various environmental effects, all in order to create the impression that the dinosaurs were recorded in-camera and were not digital effects. Finally, imperfections and filming tools such as cables and winches were painted out using Matador and Photoshop. Rather than using quick shots of dinosaurs, which were customary for effects shots of the time, Muren and Tippett used longer shots to mimic the style of a nature documentary. Determining which dinosaur shots would be rendered through Winston's animatronics and which would be rendered through CGI depended upon multiple factors, including how much movement the dinosaur would perform within the shot, as walking shots required CGI, as well as the extent to which the dinosaur would interact with the environment, because physical interaction was easier with animatronics.

Because the film was on the forefront of photorealistic CGI development, numerous challenges arose for the cast and crew as they filmed while attempting to account for dinosaurs that had not yet been rendered. The production staff employed a variety of tools in order to establish line-of-sight references for the actors, including holding up boards in locations where a dinosaur would later be composited on, which would be marked with the letter "X", or have dinosaur heads sketched on them. During the Gallimimus sequence, the ILM animators simply inserted a dinosaur wherever the actors happened to look. The huge amount of render time required for the T. rex escape sequence was a concern, so Spielberg made the decision to have the sequence shot at night, in the rain, with only one light source, which meant that large parts of the dinosaur were hidden in shadow and thus did not have to be rendered. In order to provide audio cues and help the actors emote, Spielberg roared into a megaphone, attempting to mimic dinosaur vocalizations. Cundey had difficulty in constructing shots with computer-generated dinosaurs, including framing the camera for creatures that had not yet been composited in, as well as creating the optimal lighting for CGI realism. He credited his prior experience working on Who Framed Roger Rabbit for helping him solve these problems. One of his largest challenges working on the film was balancing the necessity of the effects crew of placing dinosaurs primarily in shadow, Spielberg's penchant for dramatic imagery, and the audience's expectation of realism.

The CGI dinosaurs by ILM, based on Winston's designs, took nearly a year to complete. Compositing the animals onto the live action scenes took around an hour. Rendering the dinosaurs often took two to four hours per frame, while the T. rex in the rain required six hours per frame. Jurassic Park has 52 CGI shots, with the end fight between the T. rex and raptors using all-CGI dinosaurs, something that made Spielberg nervous until he saw the finished result. The 127-minute film has 15 minutes of total screen time for the dinosaurs, including nine minutes of animatronics and six minutes of CGI.

==== List ====
The life-sized animatronic Tyrannosaurus rex on the set. It is the largest sculpture ever made by Stan Winston Studio.

Various dinosaurs are featured throughout the film:

- Alamosaurus appears as a skeleton in the Jurassic Park visitor center.
- Brachiosaurus is the first dinosaur the park's visitors see. It is inaccurately depicted as chewing its food and standing up on its hind legs to browse among the high tree branches. According to artist Andy Schoneberg, the chewing was done to make the animal seem docile, resembling a cow chewing its cud. The dinosaur's head and upper neck was the largest puppet without hydraulics built for the film. The animal's large size led Winston's team to create a 1/19th-scale model as reference as opposed to the 1/5th-scale sculptures of the other dinosaurs. While filming the scene in which the park visitors express shock when seeing the Brachiosaurus for the first time, a large X on a piece of paper was placed where the head of the Brachiosaurus would have been, as a line-of-sight reference and for the actors to react to. Despite scientific evidence of Brachiosaurus having limited vocal capabilities, Rydstrom decided to represent them with whale songs, cow noises, and donkey calls to give them a melodic sense of wonder. Penguins were also recorded to be used in the noises of the dinosaurs. A combination of a fire hydrant and the blowhole of a whale were used to create the sound of the Brachiosaurus sneezing.
- Dilophosaurus is also very different from its real-life counterpart, made significantly smaller to ensure audiences did not confuse it with the raptors. Its neck frill and its ability to spit venom are fictitious. Its vocal sounds were initially made of pleasant swan vocalizations as well as sounds of a dog and a baby ostrich, with sounds of a hawk, a howler monkey, an egret, and a rattlesnake incorporated once the Dilophosaurus reveals its neck frill. The animatronic model, nicknamed "Spitter" by Winston's team, was animated by the puppeteers sitting on a trench in the set floor, using a paintball mechanism to spit the mixture of methyl cellulose and K-Y Jelly that served as venom.
- Gallimimus are featured in a stampede scene in which the Tyrannosaurus eats one of them. The Gallimimus was the first dinosaur to be digitized, featured in two ILM tests, initially as a herd of skeletons and then fully skinned while pursued by the T. rex. Its design was based on ostriches, and to emphasize the birdlike qualities, the animation focused mostly on the herd rather than individual animals. As reference for the dinosaurs' run, the animators were filmed running at the ILM parking lot, with plastic pipes standing in as a fallen tree that the Gallimimus jump over. One of the animators fell over while attempting the jump, which inspired the decision to have one of the Gallimimus fall as well. Horse squeals became the Gallimimus's sounds.
- Parasaurolophus appear in the background during the first encounter with the Brachiosaurus.
- Triceratops has an extended cameo, depicted as sick from eating a toxic plant. Spielberg had initially intended to shoot scenes involving the Triceratops, as well as the other animatronics, in Los Angeles towards the end of the shooting schedule, but unexpectedly changed his mind, causing a logistical nightmare for Winston, who suddenly had only four months to build the animatronic. The model, operated by eight puppeteers on Kauaʻi, was the first dinosaur model filmed during production, and was the only one brought to Hawaii for filming. Winston also created a baby Triceratops for Richards to ride, a scene cut from the script due to pacing and tonal issues. The Triceratops vocals were primarily constructed from the sound of the cows near Skywalker Ranch, and Rydstrom recorded himself breathing into a cardboard tube to create the sound of the sick dinosaur's breathing.
- The Tyrannosaurus (an individual sometimes referred to as "Rexy") was partly represented by a life-sized animatronic, which stood 20 feet (6.1 m), weighed 9,000 pounds (4,100 kg), and was 40 feet (12 m) long. It was the largest creature made by Winston's studio up to that point. Horner called it "the closest I've ever been to a live dinosaur". While the consulting paleontologists did not agree on the dinosaur's movement, particularly its running capabilities, animator Steve Williams decided to "throw physics out the window and create a T. rex that moved at sixty miles per hour even though its hollow bones would have busted if it ran that fast". The major reason was the T. rex chasing a Jeep, a scene that took two months to finish. The dinosaur is depicted with a vision system based on movement, though later studies indicate the T. rex had binocular vision comparable to a bird of prey. In the film, its roar was created by combining a lion's roar, a tiger's snarl, a baby elephant's scream and the noises of alligators and crocodiles. (Note: Attributed to multiple references:) Its grunts are those of a male koala, and its breath was created using the sound of whale's blowhole. A dog attacking a rope toy was used for the sounds of the T. rex tearing a Gallimimus apart, while redwood trees crashing to the ground became the sound of its footsteps.
- Velociraptor plays a major role in the film. The creature's depiction is not based on the actual dinosaur genus, which was significantly smaller. Crichton instead based his version on Deinonychus, which his research had indicated to be a Velociraptor relative. He kept the Velociraptor name as he thought it sounded more dramatic. Shortly before Jurassic Park's release, the similar Utahraptor was discovered, although it proved even bigger than the film's raptors. This prompted Winston to joke, "After we created it, they discovered it." For the attack on Muldoon and parts of the kitchen sequence, the raptors were played by men in suits. Other methods would also be used to portray the dinosaurs, including on-set puppets. During a take on the kitchen set, one of the raptors slammed into Mazzello, who sustained a minor head injury from its hand claw. The various sounds of the raptors were made up of between 20 and 30 animal noises, including dolphin screams, walruses bellowing, horses breathing, geese hissing, an African crane's mating call, tortoises mating, and a human rasp. The human rasp used for the Velociraptor is the only human voice that was used to make dinosaur vocalizations. The sound of the baby dinosaur was created by recording various baby animals, in order to make the dinosaur sound cute; after it is revealed that the dinosaur is a Velociraptor, raspy sounds of a baby owl are incorporated, in order to make the baby Velociraptor sound unsettling. Following discoveries made after the film's release, most paleontologists theorize that dromaeosaurs like Velociraptor and Deinonychus were covered with feathers like modern birds. This feature is included in Jurassic Park III for the male raptors, which have a row of small quills on their heads.

=== Post-production ===
Editing had already started during filming, and within days of wrapping, Kahn had a rough cut ready, allowing Spielberg to start filming Schindler's List. During this time, Spielberg left Kennedy in charge of the day-to-day post-production responsibilities on Jurassic Park. He monitored the progress while filming in Poland by viewing effects shots, which were transmitted to him through fiber-optic cable and two satellite channels which cost $1.5 million a week to operate and were encrypted to prevent piracy. Four times a week, he and Kahn, who was also in Poland for Schindler's List, had teleconferences with Kennedy and ILM's crew. Spielberg estimated that 40 percent of the post-production process was done through this long-distance arrangement. He said working simultaneously on two vastly different productions was "a bipolar experience", where he used "every ounce of intuition on Schindler's List and every ounce of craft on Jurassic Park".

Along with the digital effects, Spielberg wanted the film to be the first with digital sound. He funded the creation of DTS (Digital Theater Systems) to allow audiences to "really hear the movie the way it was intended to be heard". Rather than the audio track being directly contained on the 35mm film, the film's audio was played onto a CD-ROM disc, with a backup analog soundtrack in case of problems. The sound effects crew was supervised by Spielberg's friend and ILM founder George Lucas. Spielberg flew on weekends from Poland to Paris, where he met with sound designer Gary Rydstrom for updates. Rydstrom initially asked scientists what dinosaurs had sounded like, but paleontologists had not yet determined the answer to his question, so he began from scratch. He chose to use only organic sounds for dinosaur vocalizations, and built a library of animal sounds to draw from, all of which were recorded for the film, with no stock sound effects. Unlike with most films, Rydstrom's work started before filming, as the mouths of the animatronics on set needed to match the dinosaur noises. Rydstrom considered the sound process fun, given the film had all kinds of noise—animal sounds, rain, gunshots, car crashes—and at times no music. The process was finished by the end of April 1993.

In addition to the CGI dinosaurs, ILM also created elements such as water splashing, digital humans, and cars. They also, in a sequence where Ariana Richards's stunt double accidentally looked up at the camera, replaced her face by having Richards match the movement, rotoscoping her face, and compositing it onto the double's body. This is considered the first ever use of digital face replacement in a film. In total, a small team of six animators and 40 artists in the computer graphics department at ILM worked on the film. The technology for the effects dramatically improved through the course of production, as shots that ILM initially believed to be impossible became achievable by the end of production. This particularly impacted the climax, which was the last CGI sequence to be planned out because of Spielberg's last-minute decision to change it. Tippett played a major role in arranging the choreography of the fight, including camera angles and the dinosaur behavior. ILM used harder, more complex shots in the finale than anywhere else in the film, including tight close-ups on the CGI T. rex, which required more detailed texture maps than all the other shots in the film. Muren pushed to shoot the climax as though it was a real animal fight, with a wide-angle lens and slightly delayed camera movements to emphasize the dinosaurs' spontaneity. Jurassic Park was completed on May 28, 1993, after ILM concluded its CGI work.

== Soundtrack ==
John Williams, a frequent composer of Spielberg's films, began scoring Jurassic Park at the end of February 1993. Alexander Courage and John Neufeld provided the score's orchestrations. Williams wrote themes designed to evoke a sense of wonder, attempting to imbue audiences with the feeling of "admiration and respect" that small children have when viewing dinosaur exhibits at a natural history museum. Three central themes were written, each with multiple variations. The first, associated with the herbivorous dinosaurs, was described by Williams as having "almost a religious aspect". The second, a more adventurous theme, is more unpredictable and adaptable, reflecting the park's capacity for wonder and terror. The third theme is built around a four-note motif, and is associated with the Velociraptors and the T. rex. However, two major sequences involving the T. rex do not use this theme. One is the escape sequence, which uses no music at all to increase tension, and the other is the T. rex's entrance in the climax, which was originally supposed to use the theme before Spielberg decided to use the adventure theme to reflect the T. rex being a heroic figure in the climax rather than a source of terror. Williams's recording session was on March 30, 1993, well into post-production, which meant that Spielberg was unable to sit in on the recording for the first time in all of their collaborations, as he was occupied filming Schindler's List in Poland. Instead, Williams previewed his scores on a piano for Spielberg to listen to before he left, and Spielberg was sent the full music in audio cassette form as it was finished. The first soundtrack album was released on May 25, 1993. For the 20th anniversary of the film's release, a new soundtrack was issued for digital download on April 9, 2013, including four bonus tracks selected by Williams.

== Marketing ==
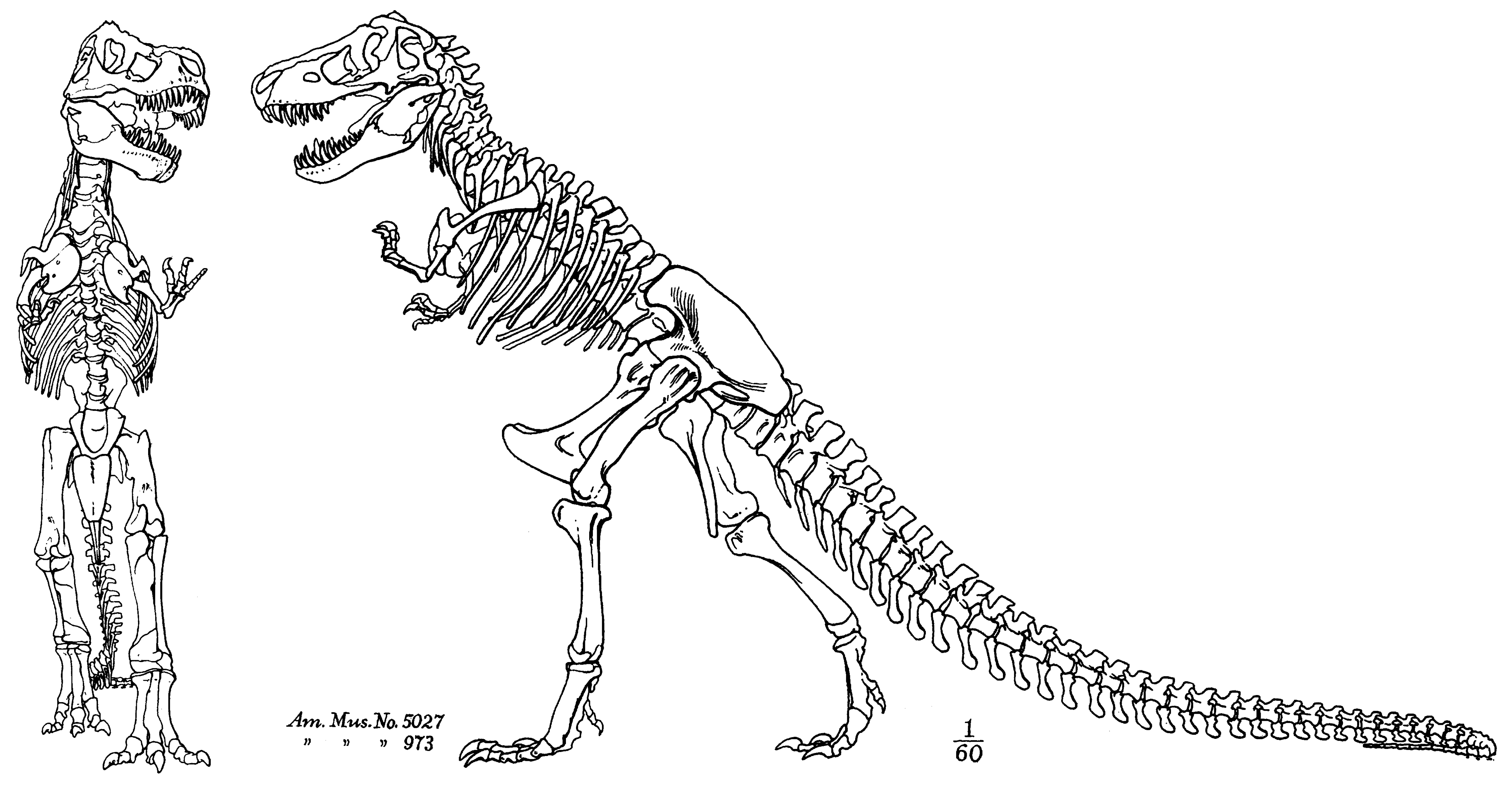
1917 skeletal diagram of Tyrannosaurus published by Henry Fairfield Osborn, which was the basis of the novel's cover, and subsequently the logo of the films.

Universal took the lengthy pre-production period to carefully plan the Jurassic Park marketing campaign. It cost $65 million and included deals with 100 companies to market 1,000 products. These included several Jurassic Park video games, a toy line by Kenner distributed by Hasbro, McDonald's "Dino-Sized meals", and a novelization for young children. The film's merchandising tagline was "If it's not 'Jurassic Park', it's extinct". By March 1994, licensed merchandise sales reached an estimated $1 billion, of which the production companies made 6–10%. Horner served as an advisor for the paleontological accuracy of the toys, which were produced over two years. Universal spent about $20 million on television advertising, while an estimated $65 million was spent on television advertising for Jurassic Park tie-in products. According to a 1994 survey, 98% of American adults had been exposed to the film an average of 25.2 times.

Much care was put into creating a logo that would serve to equally represent the fictional park and promote the movie and its tie-in products. Universal creative director Tom Martin teamed up with the design firm of Mike Salisbury, and out of 100 designs came one created by Sandy Collora, one of Winston's employees. The design took the T. rex skeleton drawn by Chip Kidd for the book's cover, put it into a circle, and added a rectangle with the title to create a badge-like structure. A jungle silhouette was added underneath for scale, and a Neuland typeface was used on the title. John Alvin was hired to design the film's poster; he went through numerous revisions, with the final design simply using the film's T. rex logo.

Neill recalled that the film was essentially marketed by Universal with the idea that the studio "could make huge blockbusters without 'movie stars", stating, "This was true enough, but I think it slightly irked us, the actors, to be reminded from time to time we were not real 'stars.'" Universal would instead tease the film's dinosaurs as the primary attraction. A teaser trailer was released in December 1992, in which a mine worker discovers a piece of amber that would be used by the theme park. A full trailer debuted shortly thereafter, providing only a fleeting glimpse of the dinosaurs, a tactic described by journalist Josh Horowitz, in 2007, as "that old Spielberg axiom of never revealing too much". Due to a ruling by the British Board of Film Classification, the film's marketing in the United Kingdom was required to include a warning about disturbing content. This was only the second film to have such a content warning, after Spielberg's Jaws. The film was marketed with the tagline "An Adventure 65 Million Years in the Making". This was a joke Spielberg made on set about the genuine, thousands of years old mosquito in amber used for Hammond's walking stick. Jurassic Park was heavily marketed against its primary competitor, Last Action Hero, which ultimately struggled at the box office and with critics.

== Release ==
=== Theatrical ===
Jurassic Park premiered at the Uptown Theater in Washington, D.C. on June 9, 1993, in support of two children's charities. The film had previews on 1,412 screens starting at 9:30 pm EDT on Thursday, June 10, and officially opened on Friday in 2,404 theater locations and an estimated 3,400 screens. Following the film's release, the Dinosaur Society and the American Museum of Natural History held a "The Dinosaurs of Jurassic Park" exhibit featuring various props, dinosaur models, and other behind-the-scenes material from the film. The film began its international release on June 25, in Brazil before further openings in South America and then rolling out around most of the rest of the world from July 16 until October. The United Kingdom premiere helped save the Lyric Theatre in Carmarthen, Wales from closure, an event chronicled in the 2022 film Save the Cinema.

=== Re-releases ===
Poster for the 2013 3D re-release

In anticipation of the film's Blu-ray release, Jurassic Park had a digital print released in UK cinemas on September 23, 2011.

Two years later, for the 20th anniversary of Jurassic Park, a 3D version of the film was released in cinemas. Spielberg declared that he had produced the film with a sort of "subconscious 3D", as scenes feature animals walking toward the cameras and some effects of foreground and background overlay. In 2011, he stated that Jurassic Park was the only one of his works he had considered for a conversion. Once he saw the 3D version of Titanic in 2012, he liked the new look of the film so much that he hired the same retrofitting company, Stereo D.

Stereo D executive Aaron Parry said the conversion was an evolution of what the company had done with Titanic, "being able to capitalize on everything we learned with Jim [Cameron] on Titanic and take it into a different genre and movie, and one with so many technical achievements". The studio had the help of ILM, which contributed some elements and updated effects shots for a better visual enhancement. Studio D president William Sherak stated that, to begin, they watched the film with Spielberg to discuss the 3D conversion, and Spielberg remembered even minor details about filming decades later. He described the T. rex chase scene as his "practical nightmare", as there were many sound elements that had to be carefully layered and assigned depth, without losing the scale of the T. rex. It opened in the United States and seven other territories on April 5, 2013, with other countries receiving the re-release over the following six months.

In 2018, the film was re-released in select theaters to celebrate its 25th anniversary. On August 25, 2023, the 3D version of the film was re-released in theaters to celebrate its 30th anniversary.

== Reception ==
=== Box office ===
Jurassic Park became the highest-grossing film released worldwide up to that time, surpassing Spielberg's own film E.T. the Extra-Terrestrial. It grossed $3.1 million from Thursday night screenings in the United States and Canada on June 10, and $50.1 million in its first weekend from 2,404 theaters, breaking the opening weekend record set by Batman Returns the year before. Jurassic Park held that record until 1995 when Batman Forever took it. It grossed a record $81.7 million by the end of its first week, and reached $100 million in a record nine days, and remained at number one for three weeks. It eventually grossed $357 million in the US and Canada, ranking second of all-time behind E.T. Box Office Mojo estimates the film sold over 86.2 million tickets in the US in its initial theatrical run.

Jurassic Park also did very well in international markets and was the first film to gross $500 million overseas, surpassing the record $280 million overseas gross of E.T. In Brazil, it also set an opening weekend record with a gross of $1,738,198 from 141 screens. It went on to break further opening records around the world including in the United Kingdom, Japan, India, South Korea, Mexico, Germany, Australia, Taiwan, Italy, Denmark, South Africa and France. In Japan, the film grossed $8.4 million from 237 screens in two days (including previews).

In the United Kingdom, Jurassic Park also beat the opening weekend record set by Batman Returns with a gross of £4.875 million ($7.4 million) from 434 screens, including a record £443,000 from Thursday night previews, and also beat Terminator 2: Judgment Day's opening week record, with £9.2 million. The film held the UK record until it was beaten by Independence Day in 1996. After 12 days of grossing over £1 million a day, Jurassic Park was the eighth highest-grossing film of all time in the UK. After just three weeks, it became the highest-grossing, surpassing Ghost and eventually doubling the record with a gross of £47.9 million. It spent a record eight consecutive weekends at the top of the UK box office. Jurassic Park spent months atop Europe's box office, was briefly surpassed by The Fugitive in mid-October before regaining its position, and was eventually permanently surpassed by Aladdin in November.

In Australia, the film had the widest release ever and was the first to open with a one-day gross of more than A$1 million, grossing A$5,447,000 (US$3.6 million) in its first four days from 192 screens, beating the opening record of Terminator 2 and the weekly record set by The Bodyguard with a gross of A$6.8 million. In the same weekend, it also set an opening record in Germany with a gross of DM 16.8 million ($10.5 million) from 644 screens. In Italy, it had the widest release ever in 344 theaters and grossed a record Lire 9.5 billion ($6.1 million). After 115 days of release, it surpassed E.T. as the highest-grossing film worldwide of all time. It eventually opened in France on October 20, 1993, and grossed a record 75 million F ($13 million) in its opening week from over 515 screens. Its first week admissions in France of almost 2.3 million surpassed the previous record set by Rambo: First Blood Part II in 1985.

The film set all-time records in, among others, Germany, Hong Kong, Ireland, Israel, Japan (in US Dollars), Malaysia, Mexico, New Zealand, the Philippines, Singapore, Spain, Thailand, and the United Kingdom. Ultimately the film grossed $914 million worldwide in its initial release, with Spielberg reportedly making $294 million, the most a director or actor had made from one film at the time. The film had a net profit of around $700 million. Its record gross was surpassed in 1998 by Titanic, the first film to gross over $1 billion.

The 2011 UK release grossed £245,422 ($786,021) from 276 theaters, finishing at eleventh on the weekend box office list. The 3D re-release in 2013 opened at fourth place in the US, with $18.6 million from 2,771 locations. IMAX showings accounted for over $6 million, with the 32 percent being the highest IMAX share ever for a nationwide release. The reissue grossed $45.4 million in the United States and Canada. The international release had its most successful weekend in late August, when it managed to climb to the top of the box office with a $28.8 million debut in China. This helped to bring the film's lifetime gross to $1.03 billion. Jurassic Park was the 17th, and oldest, film to surpass the $1 billion mark, and the only film by Universal to achieve this until 2015, when the studio released Furious 7, Minions, and the fourth Jurassic Park installment Jurassic World.

Jurassic Park grossed an additional $374,238 in 2018 for its 25th anniversary re-release. In June 2020, due to the COVID-19 pandemic closing most theaters worldwide and limiting what films played, Jurassic Park returned to 230 theaters (mostly drive-ins). It grossed $517,600, finishing in first for the fourth time in its history. Following subsequent re-releases, the film has grossed over $1.058 billion worldwide. As of 2025, Jurassic Park remains among the 50 highest-grossing films of all time, both in the US and Canada (not adjusted for inflation) and worldwide. It also remains the highest-grossing film directed by Spielberg.

=== Critical response ===
Review aggregation website Rotten Tomatoes retrospectively reported an approval rating of 91% based on 204 reviews, with an average rating of 8.50/10. The site's critical consensus reads: "Jurassic Park is a spectacle of special effects and lifelike animatronics, with some of Spielberg's best sequences of sustained awe and sheer terror since Jaws." Metacritic gave the film a weighted average score of 68 out of 100, based on reviews from 21 critics, indicating "generally favorable" reviews. Audiences polled by CinemaScore gave the film an average grade of "A" on an A+ to F scale.

Janet Maslin of The New York Times called it "a true movie milestone, presenting awe- and fear-inspiring sights never before seen on the screen [...] On paper, this story is tailor-made for Mr. Spielberg's talents [but] [i]t becomes less crisp on screen than it was on the page, with much of the enjoyable jargon either mumbled confusingly or otherwise thrown away." In Rolling Stone, Peter Travers called the film "colossal entertainment—the eye-popping, mind-bending, kick-out-the-jams thrill ride of summer and probably the year [...] Compared with the dinos, the characters are dry bones, indeed. Crichton and co-screenwriter David Koepp have flattened them into nonentities on the trip from page to screen." Roger Ebert gave the film three stars out of four: "The movie delivers all too well on its promise to show us dinosaurs. We see them early and often, and they are indeed a triumph of special effects artistry, but the movie is lacking other qualities that it needs even more, such as a sense of awe and wonderment, and strong human story values." Henry Sheehan of Sight & Sound argued: "The complaints over Jurassic Park's lack of story and character sound a little off the point", noting the story arc of Grant learning to protect Hammond's grandchildren despite his initial dislike of them. Caroline Westbrook of Empire gave the film five stars, calling it "quite simply one of the greatest blockbusters of all time".

=== Accolades ===
Year	Award	Category	Nominees	Result	Ref.
1993	Bambi Awards	International Film	Jurassic Park	Won	
1994	Academy Awards	Best Sound Effects Editing	Gary Rydstrom and Richard Hymns	Won	
1994	Academy Awards	Best Sound	Gary Summers, Gary Rydstrom, Shawn Murphy and Ron Judkins	Won	
1994	Academy Awards	Best Visual Effects	Dennis Muren, Stan Winston, Phil Tippett and Michael Lantieri	Won	
1994	Saturn Awards	Best Direction	Steven Spielberg	Won	
1994	Saturn Awards	Best Science Fiction Film	Jurassic Park	Won	
1994	Saturn Awards	Best Special Effects	Dennis Muren, Stan Winston, Phil Tippett and Michael Lantieri	Won	
1994	Saturn Awards	Best Writing	Michael Crichton and David Koepp	Won	
1994	Saturn Awards	Best Actress	Laura Dern	Nominated	
1994	Saturn Awards	Best Supporting Actor	Jeff Goldblum	Nominated	
1994	Saturn Awards	Best Supporting Actor	Wayne Knight	Nominated	
1994	Saturn Awards	Best Performance by a Young Actor	Joseph Mazzello	Nominated	
1994	Saturn Awards	Best Performance by a Young Actor	Ariana Richards	Nominated	
1994	Saturn Awards	Best Music	John Williams	Nominated	
1994	Saturn Awards	Best Costumes	Sue Moore and Eric H. Sandberg	Nominated	
1994	Japan Academy Film Prize	Outstanding Foreign Language Film	Jurassic Park	Won	
1994	BAFTA Awards	Best Special Visual Effects	Dennis Muren, Stan Winston, Phil Tippett and Michael Lantieri	Won	
1994	BAFTA Awards	Best Sound	Gary Summers, Gary Rydstrom, Shawn Murphy and Ron Judkins	Nominated	
1994	BMI Film Music Award	BMI Film Music Award	John Williams	Won	
1994	Blue Ribbon Awards	Best Foreign Film	Steven Spielberg	Won	
1994	Bram Stoker Award	Screenplay	Michael Crichton and David Koepp	Nominated	
1994	Cinema Audio Society Awards	Outstanding Achievement in Sound Mixing for a Feature Film	Gary Summers, Gary Rydstrom, Shawn Murphy and Ron Judkins	Nominated	
1994	Czech Lion Awards	Most Popular Film	Steven Spielberg	Won	
1994	Grammy Awards	Best Instrumental Composition Written for a Motion Picture or for Television	John Williams	Nominated	
1994	MTV Movie Awards	Best Action Sequence	T-Rex/Jeep scene	Nominated	
1994	MTV Movie Awards	Best Movie	Jurassic Park	Nominated	
1994	MTV Movie Awards	Best Villain	T. rex	Nominated	
1994	Mainichi Film Awards	Best Foreign Language Film (Fan Choice)	Steven Spielberg	Won	
1994	Motion Picture Sound Editors	Outstanding Achievement in Sound Editing – Sound Effects and Foley for Feature Film	Gary Rydstrom and Richard Hymns	Won	
1994	People's Choice Awards	Favorite All-Around Movie	Jurassic Park	Won	
1994	Youth in Film Awards	Best Youth Actor Co-Starring in a Motion Picture Drama	Joseph Mazzello	Won	
1994	Youth in Film Awards	Best Youth Actress Leading Role in a Motion Picture Drama	Ariana Richards	Won	
1994	Youth in Film Awards	Outstanding Family Motion Picture – Action/Adventure	Jurassic Park	Won	
1994	Hugo Awards	Best Dramatic Presentation	Jurassic Park	Won	

== Home media ==
Jurassic Park was first officially released on VHS by CIC Video on October 3, 1994, in the United Kingdom and Ireland, where it had an exclusive seven-week rental window before going on sale on November 21. In the rest of the world, it was officially released on VHS and LaserDisc on October 4, 1994 (by MCA/Universal Home Video in the United States). Despite the official release date, most US retailers decided not to wait that long and were selling it by 1 October. The film's home video release was accompanied by a $65 million advertising campaign. With 24 million units sold, Jurassic Park is the fourth-best-selling VHS tape ever. A THX certified Widescreen VHS was released on September 9, 1997.

The film was also first released as a Collector's Edition DVD and VHS on October 10, 2000, in both Widescreen (1.85:1) and Full Screen (1.33:1) versions, and as part of a box set with the sequel The Lost World: Jurassic Park and both movies' soundtrack albums. It was the 13th-best-selling DVD of 2000 counting both versions, finishing the year with 910,000 units sold. Following the release of Jurassic Park III, a new box set with all the films called Jurassic Park Trilogy was released on December 11, 2001. It was repackaged as Jurassic Park Adventure Pack on November 29, 2005.

The trilogy was released on Blu-ray on October 25, 2011, debuting at number five on the Blu-ray charts, and was nominated as the best release of the year by both the Las Vegas Film Critics Society and the Saturn Awards. In 2012, Jurassic Park was among twenty-five films chosen by Universal for a box set celebrating the studio's 100th anniversary, while also receiving a standalone 100th anniversary Blu-ray featuring an augmented reality cover. The following year, the 20th anniversary 3D conversion was issued on Blu-ray 3D.

The film, alongside The Lost World, Jurassic Park III and Jurassic World, was released as part of a 4K Ultra HD Blu-ray box set on May 22, 2018, in honor of the original film's 25th anniversary.

=== Television premiere ===
Jurassic Park was broadcast on television for the first time on NBC on May 7, 1995, following the April 26 airing of The Making of Jurassic Park. Some 68.12 million people tuned in, garnering NBC a 36 percent share of all available viewers that night. Jurassic Park was the highest-rated theatrical film broadcast on television by any network compared to theatrical film ratings since April 1987. In June–July 1995, the film aired a number of times on the Turner Network Television (TNT) network.

== Legacy ==
Over the years, film critics and industry professionals have often cited Jurassic Park as one of the greatest and most influential movies in history. In 2001, the American Film Institute named Jurassic Park the 35th-most thrilling film of all time. Two years later, Empire called the first encounter with a Brachiosaurus the 28th-most magical moment in cinema. In 2004, Empire judged Jurassic Park to be the sixth-most influential film in the magazine's 15-year lifetime. Film Review, in 2005, declared the film to be one of the five most important in the magazine's 55-year history.

Jurassic Park is included in the book 1001 Movies You Must See Before You Die, and in a 2007 list by The Guardian of "1000 films to see before you die". In 2008, an Empire poll of readers, filmmakers, and critics also rated it one of the 500 greatest films of all time. In a 2010 poll, the readers of Entertainment Weekly rated it the greatest summer movie of the previous 20 years. In 2014, it was ranked as one of the 50 greatest films of all time in an extensive poll undertaken by The Hollywood Reporter, which balloted every studio, agency, publicity firm and production house in the Hollywood region. In 2018, Jurassic Park was selected for preservation in the United States National Film Registry by the Library of Congress, which deemed it "culturally, historically, or aesthetically significant".

In 2019, Mattel produced a line of new toys, including figures based on the film's characters. The film's 30th anniversary was marked with the release of various merchandise, including new toys from Mattel and Lego, as well as an event at San Diego Comic-Con.

=== Impact ===
Jurassic Park had a wide-ranging impact, particularly as an influence on other films due to its breakthrough use of computer-generated imagery. The film is regarded as a landmark for visual effects. Film historian Tom Shone said of the film's innovation and influence, "in its way, Jurassic Park heralded a revolution in movies as profound as the coming of sound in 1927". Numerous filmmakers saw the effects as a realization that many of their visions, previously thought unfeasible or too expensive, were now possible. ILM owner George Lucas, realizing the success of creating realistic live dinosaurs by his own company, began work on the Star Wars prequel trilogy; Stanley Kubrick decided to invest in pet project A.I. Artificial Intelligence, which he later got Spielberg to direct; and Peter Jackson began to re-explore his childhood love of fantasy films, a path that led him to The Lord of the Rings and King Kong. A number of visual effects companies transitioned to creating CGI as a result of the film, including Tippett Studio and Pacific Title & Art Studio. Winston, enthusiastic about the new technology pioneered by the film, joined with IBM and director James Cameron to form a new special effects company, Digital Domain. Jurassic Park also inspired films and documentaries with dinosaurs such as the American adaptation of Godzilla, Carnosaur (in which Dern's mother Diane Ladd starred), and Walking with Dinosaurs.

Jurassic Park was praised for its modern portrayal of dinosaurs. Many of the findings of the dinosaur renaissance, such as dinosaurs being warm-blooded, active, intelligent, and genetically related to birds, were reflected in the film, which updated the general public's previous perception of dinosaurs as being sluggish, stupid, and entirely extinct. However, the public has also absorbed scientific inaccuracies in the film, such as the size of Velociraptor, and the general view of dinosaurs has stuck with the way that they were portrayed in Jurassic Park ever since the film's release, without being updated to reflect decades of additional discoveries that have occurred since 1993. The film popularized Velociraptor, making it one of the most recognizable dinosaurs amongst the general public. It also broadly popularized the concept of de-extinction. As of 2025, Colossal Biosciences is attempting to use fragmented DNA to bring back extinct species such as the woolly mammoth, Tasmanian tiger, and dodo, prompting comparisons to the film. Film director Gareth Edwards visited its laboratories before the release of Jurassic World Rebirth and said, "This is the real Jurassic Park, isn't it?"

The film has been said to have given rise to a Jurassic Park generation: young people who were inspired to become paleontologists. Among the general public, the film also created an interest in dinosaurs, leading to increased funding for paleontology. This, combined with the rising number of paleontologists, resulted in a surge of dinosaur discoveries. Following the success of the film, Universal and Amblin started the Jurassic Foundation, a nonprofit organization that funds paleontological research. Horner, as part of his compensation for serving as the film's paleontological advisor, received significant research grants from Spielberg and Universal.

Jurassic Park's impact extended internationally. It started a trend of dubbing US films into Hindi for the Indian market and was the highest-grossing US film in India at the time with a gross of $3 million. The film's popularity led to the naming of the Toronto Raptors, a National Basketball Association team founded in 1995. In addition, fans watch the team's playoff games on a large television at Maple Leaf Square, nicknamed Jurassic Park. The film's influence resulted in a paleontology boom and major discoveries in countries such as Argentina and China; in honor of Spielberg's funding of Chinese dig sites, at his suggestion, Tianchisaurus nedegoapeferima was named after the stars of the film.

=== Franchise ===
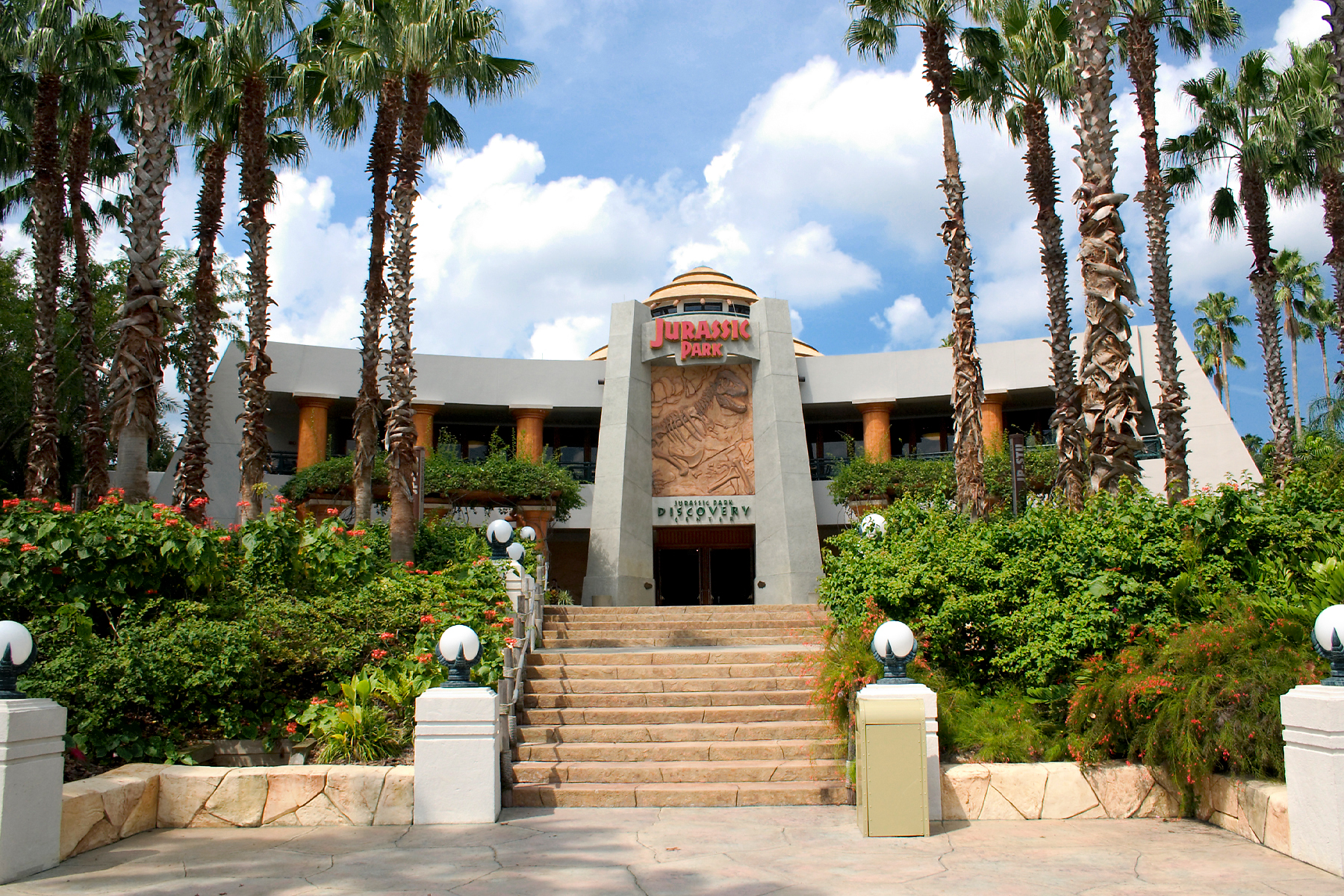
The Jurassic Park Discovery Center at Islands of Adventure

Jurassic Park was the beginning of a multimedia franchise. Following the film's success, Crichton wrote a sequel to his novel, titled The Lost World and released in 1995. Spielberg and Koepp returned respectively as director and writer for the 1997 film adaptation, The Lost World: Jurassic Park. Crichton did not write any further novels in the series, although additional films would be made, featuring previously unused elements from the two books.

The film was the beginning of a film series, broken up into one trilogy composed of Jurassic Park, The Lost World, and Jurassic Park III, a second trilogy composed of Jurassic World, Jurassic World: Fallen Kingdom, and Jurassic World Dominion, followed by another sequel, Jurassic World Rebirth. Spielberg has served as executive producer for every film after The Lost World. The original film remains the highest rated among critics.

Two spin-off animated series were also made, titled Jurassic World Camp Cretaceous and its sequel Jurassic World: Chaos Theory.

The film's story was originally continued in numerous comics, starting in 1993. Two video game sequels, Jurassic Park 2: The Chaos Continues and Jurassic Park: Rampage Edition, would also be released in 1994. Jurassic Park: Operation Genesis, based on the film's concept of building a dinosaur theme park, was released in 2003. Two subsequent games are set shortly after the events of the film – Jurassic Park: The Game, released in 2011; and the upcoming Jurassic Park: Survival, announced in 2023.

The film's success also resulted in theme park attractions, with Jurassic Park: The Ride opening at Universal Studios Hollywood in 1996. Other Universal parks would subsequently add their own Jurassic Park rides. Universal Islands of Adventure, opened in Orlando, Florida in 1999, has an entire section dedicated to Jurassic Park that includes many rides and attractions.

== See also ==
- List of films featuring dinosaurs
- Mundane science fiction – Science fiction genre depicting near-future technology and set in the solar system
- Survival film – Film genre depicting survival efforts

== Bibliography ==
- McBride, Joseph (1997). Steven Spielberg. Faber and Faber. ISBN 0571191770.
- Ryfle, Steve (1998). Japan's Favorite Mon-Star: The Unauthorized Biography of the Big G. ECW Press. ISBN 1550223488.
- Shay, Don; Duncan, Jody (1993). The Making of Jurassic Park: An Adventure 65 million Years in the Making. Boxtree Limited. ISBN 1852837748.
- Shone, Tom (2004). Blockbuster: How Hollywood learned to stop worrying and love the summer. Simon and Schuster. ISBN 9780743235686.
- Mottram, James (2021). Jurassic Park: The Ultimate Visual History. Simon and Schuster. ISBN 9781683835455.
- Duncan, Jody (2006). The Winston Effect: The Art and History of Stan Winston Studio. London: Titan Books. ISBN 9781845761509.
- Vaz, Mark Cotta; Duignan, Patricia Rose (1996). Industrial Light & Magic: Into the Digital Realm (1st ed.). New York, NY: Ballantine Books. ISBN 0345381521.
- Sito, Tom (2013). Moving Innovation: a History of Computer Animation. Cambridge, Massachusetts: MIT Press. ISBN 9780262019095.
- Berry, Mark F. (2002). The Dinosaur Filmography. Jefferson, North Carolina: McFarland & Company. ISBN 9780786424535.
- Kirby, David A. (2011). Lab Coats in Hollywood: Science, Scientists, and Cinema. Cambridge, Massachusetts: MIT Press. ISBN 9780262014786.
- Melia, Matthew (November 16, 2023). The Jurassic Park Book: New Perspectives on the 1990s Blockbuster. New York, New York: Bloomsbury Publishing. ISBN 9781501384868.
- Failes, Ian (January 13, 2026). Industrial Light & Magic: 50 Years of Innovation. Abrams Books. ISBN 978-1419784019.
- Mottram, James (December 5, 2023). Jurassic Park: The Official Script Book Complete with Annotations and Illustrations. San Rafael, California: Insight Editions. ISBN 979-8886633313.
- Friedman, Lester D. (2006). Citizen Spielberg. Champaign, Illinois: University of Illinois Press. ISBN 978-0252073588.
- Brode, Douglas (1995). The Films of Steven Spielberg. Carol Publishing Group. ISBN 978-0806515403.
- Freer, Ian (2001). The Complete Spielberg. London: Virgin Books. ISBN 978-0753505564.
- Baxter, John (1996). Steven Spielberg: The Unauthorised Biography. Hammersmith, London: HarperCollins. ISBN 9780006384441.
- McGilligan, Patrick (2010). Backstory 5: Interviews with Screenwriters of the 1990s. London: University of California Press. ISBN 978-0-520-25105-2.
- Barris, George; Fetherston, David (1996). Barris TV and Movie Cars. MotorBooks International. ISBN 1-61060-818-6.
- Udel, James C. (2013). The Film Crew of Hollywood: Profiles of Grips, Cinematographers, Designers, a Gaffer, a Stuntman and a Makeup. McFarland & Company. ISBN 978-0-7864-6484-5.
