= Dinosaur (2000 film) =

2000 live action/animated Disney film

- Theatrical release poster
- Directed by: Ralph Zondag; Eric Leighton
- Screenplay by: John Harrison; Robert Nelson Jacobs; Walon Green
- Story by: Walon Green; John Harrison; Robert Nelson Jacobs; Thom Enriquez; Ralph Zondag
- Produced by: Pam Marsden
- Starring: D. B. Sweeney; Alfre Woodard; Ossie Davis; Max Casella; Hayden Panettiere; Samuel E. Wright; Julianna Margulies; Peter Siragusa; Joan Plowright; Della Reese
- Cinematography: David Hardberger; S. Douglas Smith
- Edited by: H. Lee Peterson
- Music by: James Newton Howard
- Production companies: Walt Disney Feature Animation; The Secret Lab; Spikes Up
- Distributed by: Buena Vista Pictures Distribution (Note: Distributed under the Walt Disney Pictures banner.)
- Release dates: May 13, 2000 (El Capitan Theatre); May 19, 2000 (United States)
- Running time: 82 minutes
- Country: United States
- Language: English
- Budget: $127.5 million
- Box office: $349.8 million

Dinosaur is a 2000 American adventure film directed by Ralph Zondag and Eric Leighton and written by John Harrison, Robert Nelson Jacobs, and Walon Green. Produced by Walt Disney Feature Animation and The Secret Lab, the live-action animated film stars the voices of D. B. Sweeney, Alfre Woodard, Ossie Davis, Max Casella, Hayden Panettiere, Samuel E. Wright, Julianna Margulies, Peter Siragusa, Joan Plowright, and Della Reese. The film follows a young Iguanodon named Aladar (Sweeney) who was adopted and raised by a family of lemurs on a tropical island. They are forced to the mainland by a catastrophic meteorite impact; setting out to find a new home, they join a herd of dinosaurs heading for the "Nesting Grounds", but must contend with the group's harsh leader, as well as external dangers such as predatory Carnotaurus.

The initial idea was conceived in 1986 by Phil Tippett and Paul Verhoeven, which they conceived as a darker, naturalistic film about dinosaurs. The project underwent numerous iterations with multiple directors attached. In 1994, Walt Disney Feature Animation began development on the project and spent several years developing the software to create the dinosaurs. While the characters in Dinosaur are computer-generated, most of the backgrounds are live-action and were filmed on location. A number of backgrounds were found in various continents such as the Americas and Asia; various tepuis and Angel Falls also appear in the film. With a budget of $127.5 million, Dinosaur was reportedly the most expensive computer-animated film at the time.

Dinosaur was released on May 19, 2000, to mixed reviews from critics, who praised the film's opening sequence, soundtrack and animation, but criticized the story, screenplay and lack of originality. The film grossed $349.8 million worldwide, becoming the fifth highest-grossing film of 2000. It became the fourth best-selling home video release of 2001, selling 10.6 million copies and garnering $198 million in sales.

== Plot ==
A Carnotaurus ambushes a herd of dinosaurs and tramples an Iguanodon nest. One surviving Iguanodon egg journeys to a tropical island inhabited by prehistoric lemurs by the flight of a pterosaur. Plio, the daughter of lemur patriarch Yar, names the newly-hatched baby Aladar and raises him alongside her daughter Suri, despite Yar's initial objections.

Years later, an adult Aladar watches the lemurs take part in a mating ritual, where Plio's teenage brother Zini fails to attract a mate. Moments after the ritual ends, a colossal asteroid crashes into the sea, releasing explosive shockwaves and fire clouds that destroy the island. Aladar and Yar's family flee and swim to the mainland, mourning for the loss of all lemurs before moving inland.

While crossing a burnt desert, the group is attacked by a pack of Velociraptor. They escape them by joining a multi-species herd of dinosaur refugees heading to the Nesting Grounds, an oasis left undevastated by the destruction of the asteroid. The herd's callous leader, Iguanodon Kron, forces the family to the back of the line, where they befriend a trio of elderly dinosaurs, Styracosaurus Eema, her pet Ankylosaurus Url, and her friend Brachiosaurus Baylene.

The herd travel for days to the site of a lake, only to find it seemingly dried up. Determined to reach the Nesting Grounds, Kron orders the herd to move on, and let the weakest perish. Realizing water is buried under the dried lake, Aladar digs with Baylene until they reach the water table, saving the herd from dehydration. Kron's sister Neera, impressed by Aladar's compassion, begins to grow closer to him. Kron sees Aladar's increasing popularity as a challenge to his dominance.

Meanwhile, a pair of Carnotaurus are hunting the herd. Kron's lieutenant Bruton and a scout are ambushed, but Bruton escapes injured to warn Kron of the approaching predators. Kron has the herd abandon Aladar, the lemurs, the elderly dinosaurs, and Bruton, hoping they will slow down the pursuers. The group takes shelter in a cave during a rainstorm. The Carnotaurus track the group to the cave and attacks them during the night. Bruton sacrifices himself to cause a cave-in that kills one of the Carnotaurus, forcing the other to retreat.

Venturing deeper into the cave, the group reaches a dead end, causing Aladar to briefly lose hope. Baylene reproaches him for giving up, and uses her strength to smash through the wall, revealing the lush Nesting Grounds on the other side. As they briefly celebrate their new home, Eema notices that a landslide has collapsed the usual entrance into the valley. Aladar rushes to warn Kron, attempting to force the herd to climb the rubble, unaware of the sheer drop on the other side. Seeing the warning as a challenge for the position of herd leader, Kron attempts to kill Aladar, until Neera intervenes. Exasperated by Kron's cruelty, Neera and the herd turn against Kron by leaving with Aladar, while Kron stays behind to climb the rubble himself.

The surviving Carnotaurus arrives and charges at the herd, but Aladar rallies them together to outnumber it. Sensing easier prey, the Carnotaurus decides to go after the isolated Kron instead. Aladar and Neera rush to his aid, as Kron is attacked and mortally wounded. Aladar pushes the Carnotaurus towards the edge of the drop, where the ground gives way, causing the predator to fall to its demise. Aladar and Neera mourn for Kron's demise, before leading the herd to the Nesting Grounds. Some time later, a new generation of dinosaurs hatches, among them Aladar and Neera's children, while the lemurs find more of their own kind.

== Voice cast ==
- D. B. Sweeney as Aladar, a brave and compassionate young Iguanodon. He is the adoptive son of Plio, grandson of Yar, nephew of Zini and the older brother of Suri.
- Alfre Woodard as Plio, a wise lemur who cares for her family. She is the daughter of Yar, older sister of Zini, mother of Suri and the adoptive mother of Aladar.
- Ossie Davis as Yar, a lemur with a gruff attitude but a gentle heart. He is the father of Plio and Zini, maternal grandfather of Suri, and the adoptive maternal grandfather of Aladar.
- Max Casella as Zini, a wisecracking and somewhat hapless teenage lemur, who fancies himself a ladies' man. He is the younger brother of Plio, son of Yar, and the maternal uncle of Suri and Aladar.
  - Evan Sabara voices Zini as a child.
- Hayden Panettiere as Suri, a sweet, fun-loving young lemur. She is Aladar's adoptive younger sister, Plio's daughter, Zini's niece, and Yar's granddaughter.
- Samuel E. Wright as Kron, Neera's brother and the Iguanodon leader of the herd of survivors. He behaves as a Social Darwinist, only concerned about the "fit/strong" dinosaurs and his own position as leader.
- Julianna Margulies as Neera, a kindly, sensible Iguanodon who is Kron's sister and Aladar's love interest.
- Peter Siragusa as Bruton, Kron's harsh and fatalistic Iguanodon lieutenant who softens once Plio helps heal his injuries.
- Joan Plowright as Baylene, an elderly, dainty and friendly Brachiosaurus, who is the last known of her kind after the meteorite. Initially, this character was intended to be a male Brachiosaurus named Sorbus, voiced by Chris Farley. After Farley's death, the character was rewritten as a female.
- Della Reese as Eema, a wizened, elderly and slow-moving Styracosaurus with a comically snarky demeanor.

== Production ==
=== Development ===
"The reason why I wanted to do it was because it had this cosmic vision about evolution. That sounds a bit over the top but it would have been really good...There was a gigantic battle at the end as a comet moves closer and closer to Earth. The fight was between the sympathetic Styracosaurus and the antagonist Tyrannosaurus rex, and although the good guy wins, there's nothing to win any more because the comet hits Earth, and all the dinosaurs die. The lemurs survive because they are small enough to hibernate. The end of the film was the beginning of the human race."

— Paul Verhoeven on the original idea

After founding his own namesake studio, special effects artist Phil Tippett directed Prehistoric Beast (1984), an experimental animated short film in which a Centrosaurus is stalked by a Tyrannosaurus. Tippett's skill at creating go motion animated creatures led to the 1985 CBS animated documentary Dinosaur!. A year later, Tippett was hired to work on the special effects team for RoboCop (1987). During filming, in December 1986, Tippett recalled, "When Jon Davison and I were shooting the live-action plates where ED-209 falls down the stairs, there was some kind of delay. Peter Weller's shoes didn't fit. so we had to wait for someone to get the right stunt shoes." Frustrated by the delay, Tippett suggested to Paul Verhoeven that they should produce a "dinosaur picture". That way, according to Tippett, "[w]e wouldn't have to be held up by actors in robot outfits."

Verhoeven was excited at the idea and suggested an approach inspired by Shane (1953) in which "you follow a lead character through a number of situations and moving from a devastated landscape into a promised land." Verhoeven, Tippett, and Davison pitched their idea to Walt Disney Pictures, where it was placed into active development under their live-action division. Verhoeven and Tippett then hired screenwriter Walon Green, best known for The Wild Bunch (1969) and Sorcerer (1977), to write a story treatment. Green explained, "I wrote a pretty extensive treatment, which we were going to use instead of a script. Since there was no dialogue, we were going to storyboard from the treatment."

Their version was intended to be darker and violent in tone, in a style akin to a nature documentary. The film's original main protagonist was a Styracosaurus named Woot and the main antagonist was a Tyrannosaurus rex named Grozni, with a small mammal named Suri as a supporting character. After Woot defeats Grozni in a final fight, the film would end with the Cretaceous-Paleogene extinction event, which would ultimately result in the death of the dinosaurs.

Once Green had finished his treatment, Disney's finance department calculated the film's production budget would total $75 million, opposite to the studio's insistence to cost approximately $20 million. Verhoeven told Cinefantastique he had calculated the project's preliminary budget to be $45 million, but then Disney chairman Jeffrey Katzenberg felt there wasn't "enough of an audience to justify that cost." In December 1990, Thomas Schumacher of Walt Disney Feature Animation flew out to Eastern Europe after the release of The Rescuers Down Under to hire new animators. Schumacher remembered, "While I traveled around Eastern Europe looking for my traditional animators, I was meeting with people who had also been talked with about the stop motion animation to make this dinosaur film." Verhoeven and Tippett had planned to use stop motion animation techniques such as puppets, scale models and miniatures. Despite a successful stop motion test, and being impressed with early computer animation tests, Tippett felt stop motion was not the right approach for the film.

Meanwhile, Green was prompted to write a "voice-over" treatment where the lemurs would narrate the story, though he remained unsure if "this'll work or not." Further meetings with Katzenberg reached an impasse to the point Green, Davison, and Verhoeven told Tippett that they were going to skip another scheduled meeting. By this point, producer Kathleen Kennedy approached Tippett with a galley for Michael Crichton's then-upcoming novel Jurassic Park. Verhoeven then called Tippett stating, "I know Spielberg has contacted you about Jurassic Park, you should do that instead."

Before Verhoeven and Tippett had left the project, producer/director Thomas G. Smith became involved in the film, but became the director after they had left. Reflecting on his tenure, Smith said, "Jeanne Rosenberg was still writing the script, but it was in trouble. Disney wanted a cute story of dinosaurs talking, and I didn't like the idea. I thought it should be more like Jean Annaud's The Bear. I wanted to have actual lemurs in it. They actually existed at the time of dinosaurs [...] We actually located a guy who trains them." However, Katzenberg called Smith to help on Honey, I Blew Up the Kid (1992) in which he was replaced by David W. Allen, who had just finished directing Puppet Master II (1990). Multiple months were spent filming actual lemurs to portray Suri and creating visual development, but Allen's version also fell into development hell. Smith stated, "The thing that ultimately killed it is that Disney knew that Jurassic Park was coming along pretty well, and they knew it was being done digitally. They figured, 'Well, maybe, we should wait until we can do it digitally.'"

By 1993, Walt Disney Imagineering (WDI) was developing the DinoLand U.S.A. section for Walt Disney World's Animal Kingdom, to be accompanied with a dinosaur attraction ride. Michael Eisner wanted to revive the dinosaur film, thus it would create a "reciprocal process between the studio and Imagineering." Schumacher recalled, "So Michael wanted to make this movie, but we didn't have a story. All we knew is that it had to have dinosaurs, and at the time it was called Countdown to Extinction, like the attraction at Animal Kingdom." As CGI animation was still in its infancy, Disney considered hiring Industrial Light & Magic (ILM) to animate the film, but this proved to be too expensive.

George Scribner was selected as the director, and he was later teamed with Ralph Zondag. Zondag had previously animated for Sullivan Bluth Studios in Ireland, and was hired as a storyboard artist on Pocahontas (1995). Storyboard artist Floyd Norman described Scribner's version as being "more than just a struggle for survival. He wanted this dinosaur movie to have elements of fun and humor ... Our director wanted to explore the fun elements of dinosaurs, such as their size, shape, and texture. George also knew that since dinosaurs come in all sizes—what wacky relationships might I come up with? What funny situations might plague a critter of such massive size?" Scribner left the project to work at Walt Disney Imagineering, and Eric Leighton was hired as co-director. Leighton had previous experience as a stop motion animator for Colossal Pictures, ILM, Tippett Studio, and Henry Selick Productions. Leighton had been familiar with the project beforehand, stating he had read Green's 1988 treatment. Both Zondag and Leighton cited King Kong (1933) as an inspiration.

In late 1994, Walt Disney Feature Animation developed various animation tests, placing CGI characters in miniature model backdrops. The idea to use CGI backgrounds was considered, but based on a proof-of-concept animation test in March 1996, it was rejected. Ultimately, the filmmakers decided to take the unprecedented route of combining live-action scenery with computer-generated character animation.

Initially, the characters were intended to be nonverbal characters, with the characters communicating in voice-over similar to Homeward Bound: The Incredible Journey (1993). Michael Eisner was screened a voice-over animation test (now known as the "Noah version") and felt it was strange the characters were communicating without lip or mouth movement. Pam Marsden, the film's producer, agreed, "We felt we needed to have them talk. Part of it is, we don't have any people in the movie, so somebody has to act." To accommodate this change, Aladar was given lips in contrast to actual Iguanodons which had beaks.

The new script had an Iguanodon named Noah as the protagonist wandering with his grandparents and a lemur companion named Adam, and a group of Carnotaurus as well as a rival Iguanodon named Cain playing the antagonists. The story dealt with Noah, who had the ability to see visions of the future, foreseeing the coming of an asteroid and struggling to guide a herd of other dinosaurs to safety. Further into production, Noah, Cain and Adam were renamed Aladar, Kron and Zini, and certain aspects of the story were altered further into what was later seen in the final product.

=== Animation ===
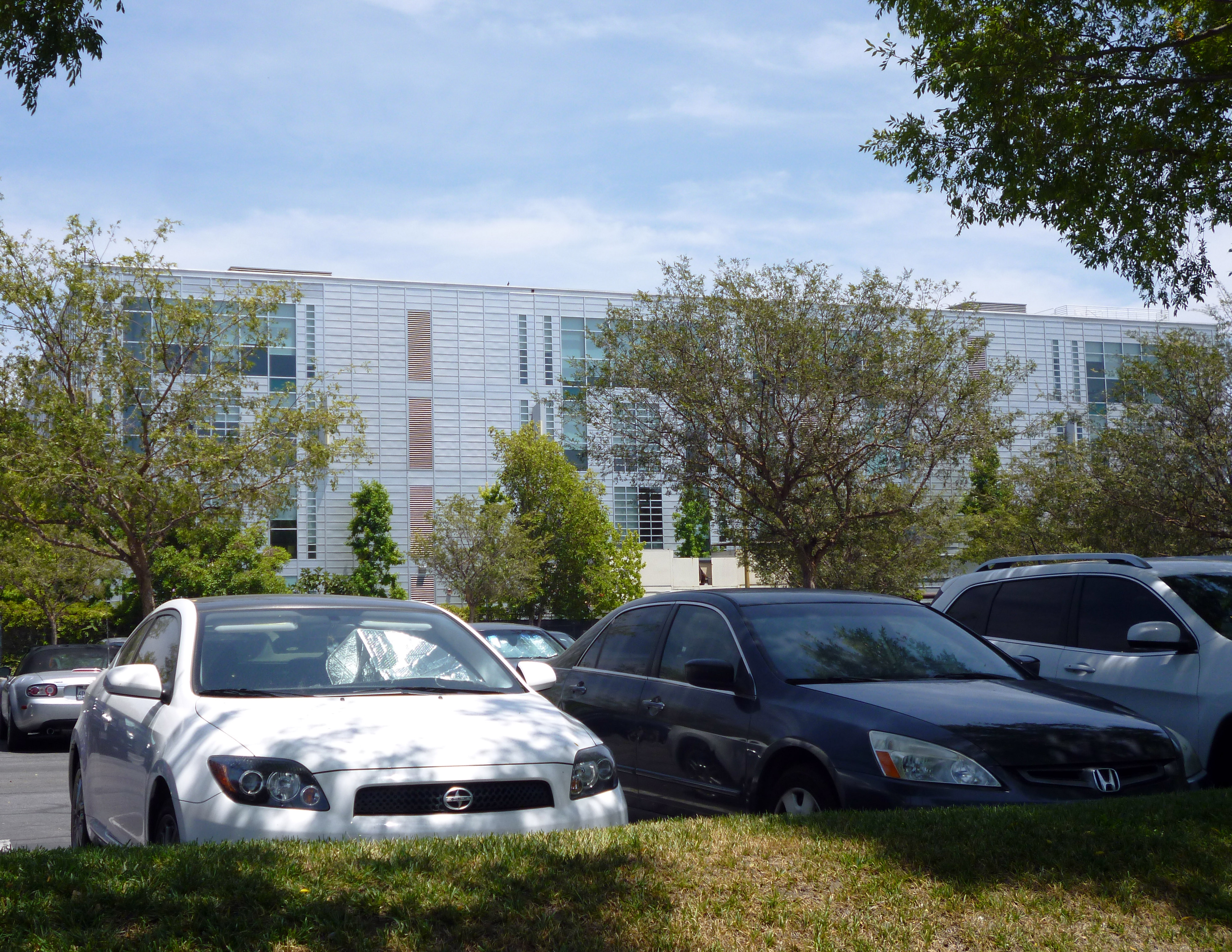
The Secret Lab's former location in Burbank, California.

On April 17, 1996, the Walt Disney Company announced they had acquired the visual effects studio, Dream Quest Images. The studio was merged with the Feature Animation department's Computer Graphics Unit in order to form The Secret Lab. Vision Crew Unlimited provided the live-action visual effects. At the time, the Secret Lab's initial studio was reconstructed from a former Lockheed Martin (former Lockheed) building in Burbank, California. Most of the computers were used from Silicon Graphics and additional machines were installed to create a render farm in order to provide workstations for artists, software engineers, and technical directors. The production team eventually re-located to the Feature Animation's Northside building in January 1997, and animation officially began eight months later, although some preliminary work had already begun.

To ensure realistic CG animation, 3D workbooks were created using Softimage 3D software. 48 animators worked on the film, using 300 computer processors to animate the film. Having aspired to be a paleontologist, David Krentz supervised the character design and visual development teams. He had an orthographic view of the dinosaurs, and his character designs were drawn on paper and scanned into the Alias PowerAnimator software for the modelers to rig in the computers. In the character animation department, the dinosaur characters were first visualized in the computer in skeletal form. The rough character animations were then transferred into three software programs to strengthen the visuals of the characters. The programs were "Fur Tool," which was used for the lemurs and to create feathers and grass; "Body Builder," which was used to create skin and muscles for the dinosaurs; and "Mug Shot," a shape blender that works within Alias Maya for facial animation and lip-synching.

Headed by David Womersley, live-action photography units shot on actual jungle, beach, and desert locations including California, Florida, Hawaii, Australia, Jordan, Venezuela, and Samoa. In total, two live-action film crews shot more than 800,000 feet (240,000 m) of film, although one scene, which takes place inside a cave, utilized a computer-generated background. In order to approximate a dinosaur's perspective, visual effects supervisor Neil Krepela invented the "Dino-cam", in which a camera was rigged on a cable suspended between two 72-foot (22 m)-tall towers. The computer-controlled camera allowed for panning and tilting on 360 degrees and moved at up to 30 miles (48 km) per hour across a span of 1,000 feet (300 m). With the live-action elements shot and the character animation reaching completion, the footage was moved into the Scene Finaling department. Under Jim Hillin, the effects-compositing team blended 80–90 percent of the live action plates against the computer-animated characters. The lighting department then adjusted the final lighting of the shots by changing the lighting conditions and replacing the skies.

=== Filming accident ===
On February 26, 1998, while filming live-action footage in Poison Canyon near Trona, San Bernardino County, California, a crew member was killed and another seriously wounded when a camera boom struck a cross-country power line. Disney was sued by the surviving crew member and the deceased's family, and the company was later fined $5,000 for violating worker safety laws.

== Music ==
Dinosaur: An Original Walt Disney Records Soundtrack

Film score by James Newton Howard
- Released: May 5, 2000
- Recorded: 1999–2000
- Genre: Film score
- Length: 49:39
- Label: Walt Disney
- Producer: James Newton Howard

The film's score was composed by James Newton Howard with choral directing by Lebo M, who did vocals for The Lion King (1994). In September 1999, it was reported that pop singer/songwriter Kate Bush had written and recorded a song for the film to be used in the scene in which Aladar and his family mourn the destruction of their island. Reportedly, preview audiences did not respond well to the song. The producers recommended that Bush rewrite it, but she refused. Ultimately, due to complications, the track was not included on the soundtrack.

The soundtrack album was released on May 5, 2000, by Walt Disney Records. Howard would later compose the scores for the Disney animated features Atlantis: The Lost Empire (2001), Treasure Planet (2002), and Raya and the Last Dragon (2021). One track, "The Egg Travels", was heard in many trailers following the film's release, including Lilo & Stitch (2002), The Wild Thornberrys Movie (2002), and Around the World in 80 Days (2004).

While the film got mixed reviews from critics, the film score received universally positive critical reception, with critics singling out "The Egg Travels" in particular as one of the best. For his work, James Newton Howard was nominated for an Annie Award for Music in a Feature Production and Saturn Award for Best Music, but simultaneously lost to Randy Newman for Toy Story 2 (1999) and James Horner for How the Grinch Stole Christmas (2000).

== Release ==
Dinosaur premiered at the El Capitan Theatre on May 13, 2000. In conjunction during its theatrical release, the film was accompanied by an exclusive interactive dinosaur exhibit center adjacent to the El Capitan Theatre titled The Dinosaur Experience. The film was theatrically released in North America on May 19, 2000, along with the DreamWorks Pictures films Road Trip and Small Time Crooks. It received a PG rating from the Motion Picture Association of America due to "intense images." This was the second Walt Disney Feature Animation film to do so, after The Black Cauldron in 1985.

=== Marketing ===
Similar to the promotional marketing of The Lion King (1994), Disney began the promotional rollout for Dinosaur by attaching a teaser trailer consisting entirely of the film's opening scene to the theatrical release of Toy Story 2 (1999). The same trailer was also included on the home video release of Tarzan (1999), and the Walt Disney Gold Classic Collection DVD release of The Aristocats (1970). A second trailer was later released in March and attached to the theatrical release to DreamWorks Animation's The Road to El Dorado (2000).

To promote the release of Dinosaur, the Animal Kingdom theme park ride "Countdown to Extinction" was renamed after the film, and its plot, which had always prominently featured a Carnotaurus and an Iguanodon, was mildly altered so that the Iguanodon is specifically meant to be Aladar, the film's protagonist, and the plot of the ride is now about the riders traveling through time to a point just before the impact of the meteorite that caused the extinction of the non-avian dinosaurs, to bring Aladar back to the present and save his life. A "Dinosaur Jubilee" was held at the Animal Kingdom's DinoLand U.S.A. It ran from May to July 2000 and included interactive games, music, and a display of the replica of the dinosaur Sue. A walkthrough attraction based on the film also opened temporarily in Discoveryland at Disneyland Paris.

McDonald's launched a four-week promotion in May 2000. The restaurant chain sold Dinosaur-themed Happy Meals, which included toys such as hand puppets and talking dinosaur figures. It also ran the "Hatch, Match & Win" sweepstake contest in the United States, where customers could collect game pieces with their meals for a chance to win various prizes. Mattel also produced toys based on the film, and the Disney Store chain sold other film-based merchandise. Frito-Lay, General Mills and Nestlé served as additional promotional partners.

=== Home media ===
The film was released on VHS and DVD on January 30, 2001. It was also released on 2-Disc Collector's Edition DVD that same day. Both DVD releases are THX certified and feature a DTS 5.1 audio track. For the Collector's Edition version, first disc contained supplemental bonus features, including two audio commentaries: one from directors Ralph Zondag and Eric Leighton and the effects supervisors, and the other from producer Pam Marsden and the animators. It also featured interactive games and an educational short explaining the various prehistoric eras. The second disc contains numerous behind-the-scenes documentary features, including early animation tests.

During its first week on the DVD sales chart, the standard version ranked first, while the Collector's Edition ranked sixth below the former release, What Lies Beneath, Gladiator, Coyote Ugly and Me, Myself & Irene. In December 2001, Variety reported it was the fourth best-selling home video release of the year, behind Shrek, How the Grinch Stole Christmas and Pearl Harbor. It had sold 10.6 million copies and garnered $198 million. It was re-released on VHS on February 25, 2003. The film was released on Blu-ray for an original widescreen presentation on September 19, 2006.

=== Video games ===
On May 16, 2000, Disney Interactive released a video game based on the film on a Microsoft Windows/Mac CD-ROM as part of the Activity Center series. Additionally, Ubi Soft released a tie-in video game on Dreamcast, PlayStation, PlayStation 2, PC, and Game Boy Color.

== Reception ==
=== Box office ===
During its opening weekend, Dinosaur grossed $38.8 million from 3,257 theaters in the United States and Canada, beating out Gladiator and Road Trip to take the number-one spot. This made it the third-highest opening weekend for an animated film at the time, behind Toy Story 2 and The Lion King. The film was dethroned by Mission: Impossible 2 the following weekend, but still collected a three-day gross of $32 million. By June 2000, it became the fourth film of the year to cross the $100 mark, following Erin Brockovich, Gladiator and Mission: Impossible 2.

In the UK, Dinosaur grossed $3 million in its opening weekend, topping the box office to beat out Nutty Professor II: The Klumps, Road Trip, Billy Elliot and Romeo Must Die. It was overtaken by What Lies Beneath during its second weekend, but it managed to outgross newcomers Coyote Ugly and Bring It On with $2.6 million in second place. In its third weekend, the film briefly returned to the number-one spot with $3.1 million. Once What Lies Beneath reclaimed top spot, the film once again fell into second place in its fourth weekend. In Japan, it had a record opening for a Disney film with an opening weekend gross of $5 million, beating the record set by Toy Story 2. It ranked behind A Bug's Life as the second-highest opening weekend for an animated film in Colombia with $270,000. The film also surpassed Tarzan to have Thailand's highest opening for an animated film with $440,000, while delivering the third-highest opening of 2000 in the country, after X-Men and Mission: Impossible 2.

It grossed $137.7 million in the United States and Canada and $212.1 million in other territories for a worldwide total of $348.8 million. The film's expensive production and marketing costs prevented the film from breaking even during its theatrical release.

=== Critical response ===
On the review aggregator website Rotten Tomatoes, the film holds an approval rating of 65% based on 124 reviews and an average score of 6.2/10. The website's consensus reads, "While Dinosaur's plot is generic and dull, its stunning computer animation and detailed backgrounds are enough to make it worth a look." On Metacritic, which assigns a normalized rating to reviews, the film has a weighted average score of 56 out of 100, based on 32 critics, indicating "mixed or average" reviews. Audiences polled by CinemaScore gave the film an average grade of "A" on an A+ to F scale.

Roger Ebert gave the film three stars out of four, praising the film's "amazing visuals" but criticizing the decision to make the animals talk, which he felt canceled out the effort to make the film so realistic. Ebert wrote, "An enormous effort had been spent on making these dinosaurs seem real, and then an even greater effort was spent on undermining the illusion". On the syndicated television series Roger Ebert & the Movies, the film received two thumbs up with guest host Michaela Pereira from ZDTV's Internet Tonight additionally praising the vocal performances for the characters. Todd McCarthy of Variety called it "an eye-popping visual spectacle", but later wrote, "somewhere around half-way through, you begin to get used to the film's pictorial wondrousness — to take it for granted, even — and start to realize that the characters and story are exceedingly mundane, unsurprising and pre-programmed." Peter Keough of the Boston Phoenix wrote, "Maybe it's just the Barney hater in me, but I prefer my dinosaurs without dialogue." Michael Sragow of Salon said, "Well, Bambi meets Godzilla again in the new computer-cartoon epic Dinosaur, but the results aren't so witty." A. O. Scott, reviewing for The New York Times, praised the opening sequence as "a visual and sonic extravaganza that the rest of the movie never quite lives up to. Those scores of animators and technical advisers have conjured a teeming pre-human world, and the first minutes of the film present it in a swooping, eye-filling panorama." Summarizing the review, he later wrote that "[t]he reason to see this movie is not to listen to the dinosaurs but to watch them move, to marvel at their graceful necks and clumsy limbs and notice how convincingly they emerge into sunlight or get wet."

Kenneth Turan of the Los Angeles Times wrote that the film "astonishes and disheartens as only the most elaborate, most ambitious Hollywood products can. A technical amazement that points computer-generated animation toward the brightest of futures, it's also cartoonish in the worst way, the prisoner of pedestrian plot points and childish, too-cute dialogue." Mark Caro of the Chicago Tribune wrote "The action is easy enough to follow, and the screen is never dull. But for a story that takes place some 65 million years ago, Dinosaur is awfully reliant on recent recycled parts." Desson Howe, reviewing for The Washington Post, felt the movie "was somewhat derivative and lacked a narrative arc" and claimed it was too similar to The Land Before Time.

=== Accolades ===
Year	Award	Category	Recipients	Results
2001	28th Annie Awards			
2001	28th Annie Awards	Individual Achievement for Directing in a Feature Production	Ralph Zondag and Eric Leighton	Nominated
2001	28th Annie Awards	Individual Achievement for Music in an Animated Feature Production	James Newton Howard	Nominated
2001	28th Annie Awards	Individual Achievement for Storyboarding in an Animated Feature Production	Thom Enriquez	Nominated
2001	28th Annie Awards	Individual Achievement for Voice Acting by a Female Performer in an Animated Feature Production	Della Reese	Nominated
2001	28th Annie Awards	Individual Achievement for Effects Animation	Simon O'Connor	Nominated
2001	27th Saturn Awards	Best Fantasy Film		Nominated
2001	27th Saturn Awards	Best Music	James Newton Howard	Nominated

== See also ==
- List of films featuring dinosaurs

== Works cited ==
=== DVD media ===
- Ralph Zondag (dir.), & Eric Leighton (dir.) (January 30, 2001). Dinosaur—Audio Commentary (DVD). Disc 1 of 2 (Collector's ed.). Burbank, CA: Walt Disney Studios Home Entertainment.
- Various cast and crew members (January 30, 2001). Dinosaur—Supplemental Features (DVD). Disc 2 of 2 (Collector's ed.). Burbank, CA: Walt Disney Studios Home Entertainment.

=== Book media ===
- Kurtti, Jeff (2000). Dinosaur: The Evolution Of An Animated Feature. Disney Editions. ISBN 978-0-786-85105-8.
