= Dino King 3D: Journey to Fire Mountain =

- English poster
- Directed by: Han Sang-Ho
- Written by: Han Sang-Ho; Yoon Mi-Jang
- Screenplay by: Han Sang-Ho
- Produced by: Chang Hoon Lee
- Starring: Hee Soon Park
- Production companies: Dream Search C&C; Hengsheng Group
- Distributed by: Dream Search C&C; Educational Broadcasting System; Hengsheng Group (China); Odin's Eye Entertainment (international)
- Release dates: December 25, 2018 (South Korea); August 24, 2019 (Australia)
- Running time: 94 minutes
- Countries: South Korea; China
- Language: Korean
- Box office: $8,112,673

Dino King 3D: Journey to Fire Mountain (a.k.a. Speckles the Tarbosaurus 2: The New Paradise) is a 2018 3D South Korean-Chinese computer-generated action adventure family film. The film was released on December 25, 2018, in South Korea, and was released to other countries in 2019. A sequel to The Dino King, the film is written and directed by Han Sang-Ho, and is produced by Chang Hoon Lee.

== Plot ==
In the Late Cretaceous period, a young Tarbosaurus named Junior is chased by a Tsintaosaurus. His father, Speckles, shows up to rescue him by killing the Tsintaosaurus. Speckles scolds at Junior as he could have been killed and for not fighting back (and also due to the fact that Junior is all Speckles has left).

Speckles takes Junior up top a hill and teaches him a lesson on how Speckles' ecosystem is his kingdom and agrees to make tomorrow his first hunt.

The next day, Speckles says that Junior is the same species like him and to just go over fears. However, when Speckles is hunting some Protoceratopses, Junior's fears come back to him, and was thrown and ends up in the water. He can't swim (As Junior has become aquaphobic from being washed out to sea in the first film), so he calls for help, despite being in shallow water. Disappointed and outraged, Speckles lambasts Junior for his inability to conquer his fear. Hurt by his father's comments, Junior tells him that he hates him and the pair storm off from one another.

Later that night, Jr. has flashbacks about the death of his mother. Speckles comes to him and tells him that this world is full of dangers, yet is also full of wonders.

The next day, Jr. is hunting a Pachycephalosaurus, when five Deinonychus abduct him. Speckles pursues the Deinonychus, but two of them manage to knock him into a river at the bottom of a gorge, followed by a rainstorm that masks their trail, delaying the pursuit, but die in the battle.

Later, Junior finds himself in a desert compound where many other young dinosaurs have also been kidnapped. A young Therizinosaurus named Slash bullies Junior, but a young female Tarbosaurus named Blue defends him. A Carnotaurus named Blade tells Slash to stop the fight. The Deinonychus return, gather all the other dinosaurs up and take three other dinosaurs away from the dome and out of sight.

Meanwhile, Speckles is still looking for Jr. He meets a Saichania named Cy, who wants to avenge the loss of his best friend Daisy at the claws of the same Deinonychus, so Cy and Speckles travel to find him. Jr., meanwhile, befriends Blue and meets a Monoclonius, called Dusty, while looking for shelter. While passing through a deep, dark ravine, Speckles and Cy are attacked by five giant prehistoric scorpions. Speckles is able to kill or injure all of them, but one of the scorpions manages to sting him on the leg, poisoning him. Afterwards, they escape the ravine.

Meanwhile, at the dome, Jr., Blue and Dusty are attracted by food. Dusty tries to eat some plants, but a Dsungaripterus named Dsunga steals them. Heartbroken, she lies in her cave, but Jr. and Blue bring her some plants and berries and she becomes friends with Jr. Elsewhere, meanwhile, Cy and a dying Speckles are on their way, when Speckles begins to hallucinate on seeing Junior, but it really isn't. That's when a sand dune starts to shake and they end up in a dark pit. There, they meet a female Tarbosaurus named Fang who heals Speckle's wound with herbs. After a short misunderstanding, Fang is revealed to be Blue's mother and is searching for her. She joins Speckles and Cy on their quest for the compound.

While Jr., Blue, and Dusty are playing, Ditto, one of the members of the pack, catches them and takes Dusty all the way up the dome. In return for food, Dsunga reveals that the Deinonychus are giving the young dinosaurs as sacrifices to a mysterious beast that lives in the local volcano. The beast in turn gives the young dinosaurs to his offspring as "toys" to play with, and when they get bored, they kill and eat them, which horrifies Junior, who blames himself for not stopping the Deinonychus from taking Dusty away.

Speckles, Fang and Cy meet a Pukyongosaurus herd whose eggs are being stolen by a marauding pack of Carnotaurus in an oasis. Speckles is initially reluctant as he's determined to rescue his son, so much so, that he tries to stop Fang from intervening the raid, callously demanding that "It's none of our business" much to Fang's dismay and the Tarbosaurs get into an argument. Fang chastises Speckles for his selfishness and reminds him that when he was poisoned, she could've left him to his fate since it was his problem, not hers. But since Fang lacked Speckles's ruthless demeanor she decided against it. Fang then tells Speckles that if he can be on his way as she intends to help the sauropods before continuing on. Before Speckles and Cy could leave however, Speckles catches one of the eggs and decides to assist Fang with Cy following and telling Speckles that he can be a jerk sometimes. The bandit leader pleads for mercy, to which Speckles wisely grants, and the thieves retreat. The eggs begin to hatch. Fang states to Speckles that he did a good deed before he decides they must leave. When asked by Cy about the noise the sauropods are making, Fang explains it is how they communicate.

Back at the compound, Junior tells Blade to try and escape this area, so later that night, Junior distracts the Deinonychus, while Blade and Blue throw stones at them. But when they get to the exit, the 3 Deinonychus and Slash (who was revealed to have spoiled the plan to the raptors to sparing his life for the beast of Fire Mountain) are there, waiting for them. Immediately Junior, Blue and Blade try to escape, but were stopped to a dead end and were thrown back into their cave prison. Elsewhere, Cy, Speckles, and Fang are stargazing and talking about missing their loved ones.

The Deinonychus capture the Dsungaripterus, who are threatening to kill him, then, they chase Cy and have him cornered on a cliff. Speckles and Fang arrive and ambush them. Ditto is caught and interrogated by Speckles and Fang after being left behind and knocked off by Cy, and is eventually crushed by a brief earthquake. The pathway is blocked by boulders, but the same herd of Pukyongosaurus that the trio encountered help clear the rocks.

The volcano begins to erupt and the Dsungaripterus reports to the other dinosaurs there is a fight and scuffle occurring. Meanwhile, Speckles, Fang and Cy fight the Deinonychus pack and easily defeat them. Blade told the other dinosaurs to stampede out of the dome, because the volcano is erupting. Speckles, Fang and Cy search for Junior and Blue. Blade fights Slash and a pair of Deinonychus over a pit of lava, then, with Blue and Jr.'s help, sends Slash and the Deinonychus falling to their doom in the lava pit.

Speckles and Fang finally find Jr, Blue and Blade, who are running towards a river. Although Junior can't swim, he jumps in along with Blue and Blade. When they dive down, they find the cave the Dsungaripterus was talking about. There, they find Dusty being chased by three large iguanas. Luckily, Speckles and Fang are able to save them. However, Speckles, once again, shows his strict attitude about Junior not being brave enough to take on the beasts without retreating. Speckles soon realizes the error of his ways after being reprimanded by Blue for taking Junior for granted. However, they are soon confronted by the beast, which turns out to be a giant iguana many times larger than a Tarbosaurus (And even a T-Rex), and a fierce battle breaks out. After he and his friends lead the beast away from the adults, Junior sacrifices himself by letting the great iguana hit him, which knocks him out, the giant iguana nearly dies from being crushed by the rocks. Everyone mourns for an unconscious Junior who wakes up, making everyone relieved. Speckles apologizes to his son for being so hard on him and that he is happy that Junior is his son. The volcano starts to erupt, and the gang is able to escape after Speckles lures the same beast into crashing into the boulders.

Having finally arrived at paradise, Cy says goodbye to Speckles, Fang, Blue Jr., Blade and Dusty, who all begin a new life together.

== Synopsis ==
An action-packed family adventure that combines the realism of Walking With Dinosaurs with the heart of Finding Nemo.
Speckles, a ferocious Tarbosaurus and his young son junior, mourning the loss of their family in an epic battle, roam the lands in search of food, adventure and peace. Under the watchful eye of his dad, Junior is growing up healthy and strong, but with an overconfidence thanks to his young age. After one encounter results in Junior being kidnapped, Speckles embarks on an adventure to the ends of earth to find his son. Encountering friend and foe, ally and enemy, Speckles will stop at nothing and will take on all corners to save his offspring.|Odin's Eye Entertainment

== Cast ==
=== Characters ===
- Marcello Fabrizi as Speckles, a male Tarbosaurus. His name is derived from a pattern of spotted rosettes on his muzzle. He has three scars on the left side of his collar. His main focus during his quest is to save his son, going as far as to selfishly refuse to help a herd of Pukyongosaurus defend their eggs from a band of marauding Carnotaurus, eventually joining in when he catches one of the eggs. He eventually learns the error of his ways after finally showing his strict attitude about Junior's not being brave enough to take the beast's offsprings' heads on without retreating while he is enraged in the beast's lair, and reconciles with him moments before the volcano begins to erupt.
- Jacqui Duncan as Speckles Jr. (A.k.a Junior), an infant Tarbosaurus who is the last offspring of Speckles and Blue-Eyes. He is a kind yet cowardly Tarbosaur with hydrophobia. He later overcomes this fear and gains his courage when he and his friends escape the compound, and finally reunites with Dusty at the beast's lair, going as far as to selflessly lure its offspring away. He even reconciles with his father before the volcano erupts.
- Erin Conner as Fang, a female Tarbosaurus who is looking for her daughter, Blue, and joins Cy and Speckles on their quest after giving the latter some healing herbs for his leg. One of her teeth, on the left side of her maxilla, is longer than the rest, which gives her her name. She strives to do good deeds, especially when she learns that a band of Carnotaurus are attempting to plunder the Pukyongosaurus eggs. She later reunites with Blue in the beast's lair.
- David Collins as Cy, a Saichania that wants to extract vengeance against the raptors for the loss of his friend Daisy, and he later does so later in the story. He also serves as Speckles' coach twice in battle: once when they are traversing a scorpion infested ravine, and again when a band of thieving Carnotaurus try to steal some Pukyongosaurus eggs from the nests. He eventually leaves the group after escaping the volcano.
- Blue, an infant Tarbosaurus and Fang's daughter. Her name is derived from the stripes on her sides and head. She first meets Jr. when he first arrives at the compound after defending him, and often teases him for his timid nature. She and her friends eventually rescue Dusty when they reach the beast's lair.
- Nate Gothard as Blade, an young Carnotaurus who is at first neutral to Jr and Blue when he is first introduced in the compound. He later has a change of heart and accompanies Jr., Blue and Dusty, and, eventually, even tries to hold the leader off long enough for his friends to find the stream. However, he is rescued at the last second, and even joins them when they finally reach the beast's lair and rescue Dusty, and even after they escape the volcano.
- Sylvia Keays as Dusty, an infant Monoclonius who finds company under Jr., Blue and Blade. She tends to sneeze due to having allergies, and for this reason, Ditto takes her away to be a sacrifice for the beast. Thankfully Jr, Blue, and Blade come to the rescue in the beast's lair before she reports Jr's bravery to Speckles.
- Nate Gothard as Ditto, a Deinonychus who mimics the words of others, to the dismay of his comrades. His name was derived from his habit of mimicking others. He is later interrogated by Fang and Speckles and killed by a brief earthquake after Cy tosses him off the cliff and into a gorge.
- Slash, a young Therizinosaurus who torments Junior when he arrives at the compound. He was Blade's friend; however, he betrays him later on at the volcano, and along with the raptor leader and the red raptor, is eventually tossed into the volcano and burned alive.
- Dsunga, an old and eldery Dsungaripterus who has a tendency to take other food from dinosaurs, and later tells Speckles about the monster in the volcano, after he was interrogated by Jr. and Blue.
- Azure, the leader of the trio of Deinonychus, known for having dark red eyes. Along with the red raptor and Slash, he is eventually tossed into the lava and burned alive.
- Red, a Deinonychus who is always irritated by Ditto's mimicry. Along with the leader and Slash, he is eventually tossed into the volcano and burned alive.

== Production ==
=== Pre-Production ===
South Korean studio Dream Search C&C announced on June 5, 2015, that a sequel to The Dino King was in the works, and it was being co-produced with Chinese film studio Hengsheng Group. Like its predecessor, Dino King: Journey to Fire Mountain was in 3D and while it was expected to simultaneously open across Korean and Chinese theaters in summer of 2016, was rescheduled to summer of 2017. Han Sang-Ho returned to the role of director from the first film, and the sequel had a longer running time of 92 minutes.

Following being known only by the working title of Speckles 2, the official English title to the sequel was revealed as Dino King 3D: Journey to Fire Mountain on a teaser poster. The film's plot will revolve around Speckles raising his son, who is eventually kidnapped while exploring, forcing Speckles to go on a journey across prehistoric Korea in search of his son.

=== Post-Production ===
Michael Favelle, founder and CEO of Odin's Eye Entertainment announced in early October that the film is currently in the final stages of post-production. It was screened early in November at the American Film Market in Santa Monica.

== Future ==
We are incredibly excited to this addition to our now extensive animation slate. We are always on the lookout for universally accessible franchises with strong family values and Dino King fits this brief perfectly.

— Michael Favelle, founder and CEO of Odin's Eye Entertainment.

The film's producers aim to expand the Speckles brand into a global franchise with live performances, toys, and a TV/VoD series all based around the films and its characters.

== See also ==
- List of films featuring dinosaurs
- Dinosaur (2000)
- Finding Nemo (2003)
- Walking with Dinosaurs (2013)
- The Lion King (2019)
