= List of number-one DVDs of 2001 (UK) =

The UK Video Charts named the top-selling DVDs in the United Kingdom for each week in 2001. Dinosaur held the top spot for the most with six consecutive weeks in March/April. Shrek and Bridget Jones's Diary each figured as top sellers for four weeks to round off the year.

== Chart history ==
Issue date	Number-one DVD
1 January	Gladiator
8 January	The Patriot
15 January	Gladiator
22 January	U-571
29 January	Braveheart
5 February	Gladiator
12 February	Buffy the Vampire Slayer Season 4
19 February	Snatch
26 February	Independence Day
5 March	Friends Season 7 Episodes 1-4
12 March	X-Men
19 March	Lady and the Tramp II: Scamp's Adventure
26 March	Dinosaur
2 April	Dinosaur
9 April	Dinosaur
16 April	Dinosaur
23 April	Dinosaur
30 April	Dinosaur
7 May	The Road to El Dorado
14 May	Billy Elliot
21 May	The Little Mermaid 2: Return to the Sea
28 May	Road Trip
4 June	Road Trip
11 June	Gone in 60 Seconds
18 June	Crouching Tiger, Hidden Dragon
25 June	Crouching Tiger, Hidden Dragon
2 July	Scary Movie
9 July	Friends Season 7 Episodes 13-16
16 July	Scary Movie
23 July	Traffic
30 July	Traffic
6 August	Coyote Ugly
13 August	Coyote Ugly
20 August	Hannibal
27 August	Hannibal
3 September	Stuart Little
10 September	102 Dalmatians
17 September	102 Dalmatians
24 September	102 Dalmatians
1 October	Snow White and the Seven Dwarfs
8 October	Snow White and the Seven Dwarfs
15 October	Star Wars: Episode I – The Phantom Menace
22 October	Spy Kids
29 October	Barbie in the Nutcracker
5 November	The Emperor's New Groove
12 November	Shrek
19 November	Shrek
26 November	Shrek
3 December	Bridget Jones's Diary
10 December	Bridget Jones's Diary
17 December	Bridget Jones's Diary
24 December	Bridget Jones's Diary
31 December	Shrek
