= Tippett Studio =

American visual effects company

- Founded: 1984; 42 years ago
- Founder: Phil Tippett; Jules Roman
- Headquarters: Toronto, Canada (2026–present); Berkeley, California (1984–2026)
- Services: Visual effects
- Owner: PhantomFX
- Number of employees: 150
- Website: Official website

Tippett Studio is an American visual effects and computer animation company specializing in computer graphics (CGI) for films and television commercials. It was founded in 1984 by American animator and visual effects supervisor Phil Tippett and his wife, Jules Roman. The studio creates visual effects and animations on over fifty feature films and commercials, garnering an Academy Award, four Clio Awards and two Emmy Awards.

The company had offices located in Berkeley, California, and Toronto, Canada. In 2026, the Berkeley office closed after Tippett filed for chapter 11 bankruptcy, though the Toronto location continues to operate.

== History ==
Tippett Studio was founded in a garage in 1984 by Phil Tippett and Jules Roman, Phil's wife and the president of the company, before moving into a 6,200-square-foot warehouse. The studio began as a stop-motion animation company (by means of its particular stop-motion animation variant, the so-called go-motion animation technique). It also designed and built live-action props for films, such as RoboCop, RoboCop 2, RoboCop 3, Honey, I Shrunk the Kids and Ghost. In 1991, the studio shifted its focus to computer-generated imagery to work on Jurassic Park, (released in 1993, with Industrial Light & Magic) by developing the Digital Input Device (DID). The DID was a new effects technology which placed computer-linked sensors into the moving joints of three-dimensional, articulated character models. This system earned Craig Hayes a Scientific and Technical Achievement Academy Award and the work on Jurassic Park earned the studio an Academy Award. Creature animation work for Coneheads (also released in 1993) was the final go-motion puppet project done by the company.

The studio also worked on Blockbuster commercials featuring Ray and Carl, a guinea pig and rabbit at a pet store window from 2002 to 2007 during the Super Bowl.

Paul Verhoeven's 1997 film Starship Troopers became at the time Tippett Studio's biggest project, with over 500 visual effects shots, for which the company received another Academy Award nomination. Phil Tippett co-directed the large-scale battle sequences with Verhoeven. The studio doubled in size to digitally animate and composite hundreds of creature shots for the film.

Early in 2000, the studio re-teamed with Paul Verhoeven on Hollow Man. Craig Hayes co-supervised the creation of the invisible Sebastian whose outline becomes visible in steam, rain, water, and even blood. The outstanding visual effects were recognized with another Academy Award nomination.

In March 2024, Tippett Studio was acquired by Indian-based studio PhantomFX. On May 1, 2024, Tippett Studio filed for Chapter 11 bankruptcy. In August 2026, Tippett Studio sold off their stock of models and memorabilia as part of the bankruptcy proceedings. At the end of the month, Tippett shut down the Berkeley studio, ending its 42-year operation, though the Toronto studio remains in operation.

== Motion picture filmography ==
- 1984 Prehistoric Beast
- 1984 Caravan of Courage: An Ewok Adventure
- 1985 Dinosaur!
- 1985 Ewoks: The Battle for Endor
- 1986 Howard the Duck (alongside Industrial Light & Magic)
- 1986 The Golden Child
- 1987 RoboCop
- 1988 Willow (alongside Industrial Light & Magic)
- 1989 Ghostbusters II (alongside Industrial Light & Magic)
- 1989 Honey, I Shrunk the Kids
- 1990 RoboCop 2
- 1993 Coneheads
- 1993 Jurassic Park (alongside Industrial Light & Magic)
- 1993 RoboCop 3
- 1995 Three Wishes
- 1996 Dragonheart
- 1996 Tremors 2: Aftershocks
- 1997 Starship Troopers
- 1998 Armageddon
- 1998 Practical Magic
- 1999 Bicentennial Man
- 1999 Komodo
- 1999 My Favorite Martian
- 1999 The Haunting
- 1999 Virus
- 2000 Hollow Man
- 2000 Mission to Mars
- 2001 Cats & Dogs
- 2001 Evolution
- 2001 The One
- 2002 Blade II
- 2002 Men in Black II (alongside Industrial Light & Magic)
- 2002 The Ring
- 2002 The Santa Clause 2
- 2003 The League of Extraordinary Gentlemen
- 2003 The Matrix Revolutions
- 2004 Catwoman
- 2004 Hellboy
- 2004 Starship Troopers 2: Hero of the Federation
- 2004 The Stepford Wives
- 2005 Constantine
- 2005 Son of the Mask (alongside Industrial Light & Magic)
- 2005 The Adventures of Sharkboy and Lavagirl in 3-D
- 2006 Charlotte's Web
- 2006 Santa Clause 3
- 2006 The Shaggy Dog
- 2007 Enchanted
- 2007 The Golden Compass
- 2008 Cloverfield
- 2008 The Spiderwick Chronicles (alongside Industrial Light & Magic)
- 2008 Beverly Hills Chihuahua
- 2008 Bedtime Stories
- 2009 Drag Me to Hell
- 2009 The Twilight Saga: New Moon
- 2010 Cats & Dogs: The Revenge of Kitty Galore
- 2010 The Twilight Saga: Eclipse
- 2010 Piranha 3D
- 2011 Immortals
- 2011 Priest
- 2011 Season of the Witch
- 2011 The Smurfs
- 2011 The Twilight Saga: Breaking Dawn – Part 1
- 2012 Hemingway & Gellhorn
- 2012 Ted
- 2012 The Twilight Saga: Breaking Dawn – Part 2
- 2013 After Earth
- 2013 Horns
- 2014 A Million Ways to Die in the West
- 2014 Cosmos: A Spacetime Odyssey
- 2014 Transformers: Age of Extinction
- 2014 Deliver Us from Evil
- 2014 Teenage Mutant Ninja Turtles
- 2014 The Crossing
- 2014 The Pyramid
- 2014 The Remaining
- 2015 Jurassic World
- 2015 Star Wars: The Force Awakens
- 2016 Gods of Egypt
- 2016 League of Gods
- 2017 - 2022 The Orville (TV series)
- 2018 Solo: A Star Wars Story
- 2019 Star Wars: Episode IX - The Rise of Skywalker (alongside Industrial Light & Magic)
- 2019 Crazy Alien
- 2020 Soul Snatcher
- 2021 The Falcon and the Winter Soldier
- 2021 Mad God
- 2022 Black Adam
- TBA Sentinel

== Awards and nominations ==
=== Film ===
- 2000: Hollow Man – Academy Award nomination - Best Visual Effects
- 1997: Starship Troopers – Academy Award nomination – Best Visual Effects
- 1996: Dragonheart – Academy Award nomination – Best Visual Effects
- 1993: Jurassic Park – Academy Award – Best Visual Effects
- 1988: Willow – Academy Award nomination – Best Visual Effects
- 1985: Ewoks: The Battle for Endor – Primetime Emmy Award – Outstanding Special Visual Effects
- 1985: Dinosaur! – Primetime Emmy Award – Outstanding Special Visual Effects

=== Commercials ===
- 2002: Blockbuster Video, Carl & Ray: Kung Fu – Clio Award, Gold – Computer Animation
- 2002: Blockbuster Video, Carl & Ray: Gotta Dance – Clio Award, Bronze – Computer Animation
- 2002: Blockbuster Video, Carl & Ray: Prima Donna – Clio Award, Bronze – Computer Animation
- 2002: Blockbuster Video, Carl & Ray: Kung Fu – Clio Award, Bronze – Visual Effects
