= Dino Time =

- Theatrical release poster
- Directed by: Choi Yoon-suk; John Kafka
- Screenplay by: James Greco; Zachary Rosenblatt; Adam Beechen; Jae Woo Park
- Produced by: Robert Abramoff; Joonbum Heo; David Lovegren; Jae Y. Moh; Jae Woo Park; Sharath Sury
- Starring: (English dub); Melanie Griffith; Jane Lynch; William Baldwin; Stephen Baldwin; Rob Schneider
- Edited by: David B. Baron
- Music by: Stephen Barton
- Production companies: CJ Entertainment; Myriad Pictures; Toiion
- Distributed by: Alchemy
- Release date: November 30, 2012
- Running time: 88 minutes
- Country: South Korea
- Language: English

Dino Time (known as Back to the Jurassic in the United States) is a 2012 animated fantasy comedy adventure film produced by CJ Entertainment and distributed by Clarius Entertainment. The film was released on November 30, 2012, in South Korea.

The English dub was released on June 2, 2015, with the voices of Melanie Griffith, Jane Lynch, William Baldwin, Stephen Baldwin, and Rob Schneider.

== Plot ==
Ernie Fitzpatrick is a daredevil boy who lives in Terra Dino with his best friend Max Santiago and his sister Julia. Ernie and Julia live with their overprotective mother Sue, who has been chosen as the mother of the year. Ernie is told to go to the store after school to keep an eye on it, but he disobeys orders and goes with Max to the Terra Dino Museum to sneak into a forbidden area still under construction. Julia follows them there and uses a quarter that Ernie gave her to set off the alarm, causing Ernie and Max to be caught by the guards, and Ernie to be grounded for three weeks. Ernie disobeys orders once more by sneaking out of the house.

Ernie goes to Max's house to see if his father Dr. Santiago has had any success with activating a time machine he built four years ago. While Ernie and Max admire the time machine, Julia, who followed Ernie, reveals herself and attempts to call Sue. When Ernie and Max try to stop her, Ernie ends up spilling soda on the time machine, activating it and sending the children back to the time of the dinosaurs.

Upon exiting the time machine, the trio meets a friendly Tyrannosaurus named Tyra, who runs an orphanage. Among the orphans is a hyperactive dinosaur who quickly befriends the children. Tyra decides to take the children in as her own, but the other dinosaurs do not think that the children can protect them from the evil Sarcosuchus brothers, Sarco and Surly. The brothers reside in the lower valley, and because their lair is sinking into the tar pits, they plan to kill Tyra so they can move into and take over the upper valley. The brothers' three bird henchmen Morris, Borace, and Horace, find out about Tyra's "newborn babies", and because they mistake the time machine for a real egg, the brothers decide to have their henchmen steal it so they can lure Tyra to their lair and kill her. Back in the present, Sue and Santiago discover their children's disappearances and learn that Tyra's real egg has switched places with the time machine.

Ernie, wanting to explore before they leave, hides the time machine's power key in his pocket and claims it to be missing. The children sneak away from Tyra to "look" for the key, but they run into the hyperactive dinosaur from earlier, who accidentally causes them to fall into a river. Because the dinosaur helps them dodge boulders in the river, they decide to name him Dodger. Unbeknownst to Ernie, however, the power key falls out of his pocket and is eaten by Horace. After Tyra takes everyone back to her nest, the children and Dodger decide to have some fun while Ernie looks for the key. At the same time, Sue and Santiago start building their own time machine out of Sue's car.

Meanwhile, Tyra's real egg hatches in Santiago's house, and the newborn escapes and starts causing mayhem. Sue and Santiago capture it, but still fail to activate the time machine. Upon seeing an ancient carving on Mystery Rock, a local tourist attraction, which has been dated back to the Cretaceous, Sue realizes that spilling soda on the controls activates the time machine. Back in the lower valley, the children run into the Sarco Brothers again and forgo their chance to return home to help Tyra, resulting in the time machine sinking into a tar pit. Ernie uses his rocket-powered skateboard to blast Surly into the lava and kill him. Sarco goes for another attack but is stopped by Tyra, who is badly weakened. When Sue and Santiago arrive in the lower valley, Tyra regains her strength and kills Sarco by pushing him into a tar pit. Sue initially thinks that Tyra is an enemy, but once the children clear up the misunderstanding, they all return to the upper valley. Santiago reunites Tyra with her real baby before he and the humans return to the present, accidentally bringing home Dodger, who made the carving on Mystery Rock.

== Cast ==
- Pamela Adlon as Ernie Fitzpatrick
- Tara Strong as Julia "Jules" Fitzpatrick
- Jane Lynch as Sue Fitzpatrick
- Yuri Lowenthal as Max Santiago
- Fred Tatasciore as Dr. Santiago
- Melanie Griffith as Tyra the Tyrannosaurus
- Stephen Baldwin as Surly the Sarcosuchus
- William Baldwin as Sarco the Sarcosuchus
- Rob Schneider as Dodger
- Dee Bradley Baker as Dinosaur Vocal Effects
- Grey DeLisle as Baby Tyrannosaurus
- John DiMaggio as Horace, Big Guard
- Tom Kenny as Borace, Burger Attendant, Guard #2, Tour Guide
- Nolan North as Morris, Guard #3

Additional voices by Melanie Abramoff, Jessica DiCicco, Benjamin Diskin, Dawnn Lewis, Megan Lovegren, Mary Elizabeth McGlynn, Jamie Simone, Roger Craig Smith, and Kari Wahlgren.

== Release ==
The film was released in 2012 in South Korea. The film was slated to have a limited theatrical release beginning on December 7, 2012, in the United States, but was pulled at the last minute. A trailer was released on October 30, 2012, paired with screenings of Hotel Transylvania. The film was released in the United States on June 2, 2015, under the title Back to the Jurassic. It was later released on DVD under the same title.

== See also ==
- List of films featuring dinosaurs
