= Monsters of the Past =

1923 film

- Screenshot from the film, where Virginia May is sculpting a Tyrannosaurus Rex
- Distributed by: Pathé Exchange
- Release date: 1923
- Country: United States
- Language: Silent

Pathé Review: Monsters of the Past is a 1923 American short silent documentary film, produced as part of the Pathé Review series, featuring sculptor Virginia May at work and stop-motion footage of her dinosaur creations fighting.

== List Of Creatures ==
- A Sauropod (presumably Brontosaurus)
- The Tyrannosaurus
- Triceratops

== See also ==
- List of films featuring dinosaurs
