= Speckles: The Tarbosaurus =

- Korean poster
- Directed by: Han Sang-Ho
- Written by: Lee Young-Kyu; Han Sang-Ho
- Produced by: Kim Won-Bum; Song Lack-Hyun; Kim Hyun-Cheol; Choi Oh-Shin Executive producers: Kwak Duk-Hoon; Lee Jae-Hee; Jay Gil; Katharine Kim; Kim Jee-Hoon
- Starring: Lee Hyung Suk; Goo Ja-Hyeong; Sin Yong-woo
- Cinematography: Kim Byung-Il
- Edited by: Shin Min-Kyeong
- Music by: Lee Mi-Sung
- Production companies: Dream Search C&C; Olive Studio; EBS
- Distributed by: CJ Entertainment
- Release date: January 26, 2012 (South Korea)
- Running time: 88 minutes
- Country: South Korea
- Language: Korean
- Budget: ₩7 billion

Speckles: The Tarbosaurus (Korean: 점박이: 한반도의 공룡 3D; RR: Jeombagi: hanbandoui gongnyong 3D; lit. Speckles: Dinosaurs of the Korean Peninsula) is a 2012 3D South Korean computer-generated epic adventure drama film directed by Han Sang-Ho. The film was released under the title Dino King: An Amazing Adventure in the United States. The Dino King was released sometime after a two-part documentary movie that serves as prequel/predecessor, Tarbosaurus: The Mightiest Ever, and is followed by Dino King 3D: Journey to Fire Mountain, both also being directed by Han Sang-Ho.

== Plot ==
80 million years ago, during the Cretaceous period, a young Tarbosaurus named Speckles, for his unique birthmark, lives with his older brother, Quicks, twin sisters, and mother. Speckles is left alone when a rogue Tyrannosaurus named One-Eye causes a massive stampede of vegetarian dinosaurs to kill Speckles' siblings, and personally kills his mother, in order to usurp their territory.

Four years later, Speckles has scraped by on his own, scavenging and raiding nests. One day while attempting to steal food from One-Eye, Speckles encounters a female Tarbosaurus named "Blue-Eyes" and the pair team up to hunt and survive together. Over the years, Speckles and Blue-Eyes attempt to maintain a hunting territory away from One-Eye. Eventually, however, One-Eye discovers their hunting grounds and again attempts to usurp their territory. After Blue-Eyes is hurt by One-Eye, Speckles fights him, and eventually defeats and drives away his old nemesis.

After defeating One-Eye, Speckles and Blue-Eyes reclaim Speckles' old family nest and hunting grounds. Now a mature adult pair with three young offspring, the family is happy until forced to flee from their territory due to a volcanic eruption. During the disaster, one of the children is killed and Blue-Eyes is wounded. After this, Speckles becomes the de facto alpha of a large migratory herd of dinosaurs fleeing the natural disaster. Two weeks into the journey, Blue-Eyes collapses from exhaustion. Seeing this, a pack of Velociraptors attacks the family, and though Speckles tries to hold them off, Blue-Eyes dies from her injury, forcing Speckles to leave her body behind in order to save their children.

After a long journey, the herd arrives at a new, fertile area in which to settle. However, Speckles once again encounters One-Eye, who has been driven out by the same natural disaster. Just as he did before, One-Eye causes the bunch of herbivores to stampede in order to ambush Speckles and his two babies. One-Eye kills one of Speckles' remaining children whilst the last, Speckles Jr., is knocked off a cliff into the ocean during the ensuing fight. Speckles dives into the sea to save him, but pursued by One-Eye. After a long fight in the ocean, One-Eye is attacked and eaten by a pair of Tylosaurus. Speckles at first avenged for his family and love interest, then eventually reaches Speckles Jr. and returns him safely to shore.

In the closing monologue, Speckles wishes a peaceful, happy life for his son.

== Cast ==
=== Korean ===
- Lee Hyung Suk ... Speckles (young)
- Shin Yong-woo ... Speckles (subadult)
- Goo Ja-Hyeong ... Speckles (adult)

=== English dub ===
- C.D. Barnes ... Speckles (subadult-adult)
- Veronica Taylor ... Speckles (young)

== Production ==
In 2008 the Korean TV channel Educational Broadcasting System (EBS) released a three-part CGI prehistoric life documentary dealing with cretaceous dinosaurs in Korea: Koreanosaurus (한반도의 공룡, Hanbandoui gongryong: Dinosaurs in the Korean Peninsula, not to be confused with the dinosaur genus Koreanosaurus). The documentary achieved much success among Korean audiences and the production team of Koreanosaurus launched the production of Speckles the Tarbosaurus. Meanwhile, in 2009, the American 3D science-fiction film Avatar was released and its popularity inspired the creators of Speckles the Tarbosaurus to apply the technology to the film project. Location footage was filmed in New Zealand.

== Reception ==
The film attracted over 1 million admissions in 2012, becoming the second most successful local animation of all time. It was released to 37 territories and generated additional revenue through IPTV and DVD sales. However, critical reception outside of its home country has generally been negative, with criticism directed at its scientific inaccuracies and similarities to The Lion King

== Titles by country ==
- France: La Vie des dinosaures
- Germany: Speckles - Die Abenteuer eines Dinosauriers 3D
- Italy: Spotty il dinosauro 3D
- Korea: 점박이: 한반도의 공룡 3D (Jômbag'i: Hanbandoûi Goŋryoŋ 3D)
- United Kingdom: Speckles the Tarbosaurus
- United States: The Dino King — An Amazing Adventure
- Australia: Dino King: Speckles' Big Adventure
- Japan: 大恐竜時代 タルボサウルスvsティラノサウルス (Dai Kyouryuu Jidai Tarubosaurusu vs Tiranosaurusu)
- Thai: ทาร์โบซอรัส: ไดโนเสาร์เจ้าพิภพ (Þā̒rboxərạs: Dïnosō̒r Jō̂ Ṗivaṗ)

== Following ==
Speckles: The Tarbosaurus is actually a follow-up to a documentary, Tarbosaurus: The Mightiest Ever (originally Koreanosaurus in 2008), which was internationally released in January, 2012, before Speckles: The Tarbosaurus was released. Both are directed by the same person, Han Sang Ho. The story of Tarbosaurus: The Mightiest Ever follows a male Tarbosaurus named Patch, the original mate of Speckles' mother. Like Speckles (A product of Patch's mate's 2nd marriage), Patch has the same color scheme, birthmarks, lost all his siblings when he was young and was left to fend for himself when he was old enough. Later he paired up with Speckles' Mother, they have 2 chicks but later on, all of them died and Patch himself also met the same fate, when he was fatally wounded by a Therizinosaurus. Meanwhile, Speckles' mother found a new mate who begat Quick's, the twins and finally Speckles. It's unknown what happened to Speckles' father, as he wasn't seen with his family nor mentioned in the first film. This may suggests that like Patch, Speckles' father was also killed, or he broke up with Speckles' mother.

== Future ==
On June 5, 2015, South Korea's Dream Search C&C announced that a sequel was in the works, which it will co-produce with China's Hengsheng Group. The sequel will also be in 3D and was expected to simultaneously open across Korean and Chinese theaters in summer of 2016, but it was rescheduled to summer of 2017. Dino King: Journey to Fire Mountain will be directed by Han Sang-Ho, returning to the role from the first film, and have a running time of 92 minutes.

The official English title to the sequel was revealed to be Dino King 3D: Journey to Fire Mountain on a teaser poster. The film's story will revolve around Speckles raising his son until he is kidnapped, forcing Speckles to go on a journey across prehistoric Korea in search of his son. According to Michael Favelle, founder and CEO of Odin's Eye Entertainment, Dino King: Journey to Fire Mountain is currently in the final stages of post-production and will soon be ready to screen at the American Film Market in Santa Monica. The sequel is set for a wide release in the United States in the Summer of 2018.

We are incredibly excited to this addition to our now extensive animation slate. We are always on the lookout for universally accessible franchises with strong family values and Dino King fits this brief perfectly.

— Michael Favelle, founder and CEO of Odin's Eye Entertainment.

Other than releasing the upcoming sequel, the film's producers aim to expand the Speckles brand into a global franchise with live performances, toys based on the films and its characters, and a TV/SvoD series.

== See also ==
- List of films featuring dinosaurs
