= List of films featuring dinosaurs =

This is a list of films that feature non-avian dinosaurs and other prehistoric (mainly Mesozoic) archosaurs, pterosaurs, and marine reptiles such as mosasaurs and plesiosaurs. Three long film series are centered around dinosaurs: Godzilla (dinosaur-inspired), Jurassic Park and The Land Before Time. Inclusion of Godzilla films may depend on how dinosaur-like the creatures are.

For depictions of avian dinosaurs see Category:Films about birds.

== Live-action films ==
Title	Year	Country	Type	Ref.
65	2023	United States		
100 Million BC	2008	United States	Direct-to-DVD	
Adam’s Rib	1923	United States	Dinosaur skeletons only	
Adhisaya Ulagam	2012	India	Feature film	
Adventures in Dinosaur City	1991	United States, United Kingdom, Italy	TV film	
The Adventures of Jurassic Pet	2019	United States		
The Adventures of Jurassic Pet: The Lost Secret	2023	United States		
The Adventures of Jurassic Pet: Return to the Wild	2024	United States		
Age of Dinosaurs	2013	United States	Direct-to-DVD	
Along the Moonbeam Trail	1920	United States		
The Animal World	1956	United States		
Anonymous Rex	2004	United States	Direct-to-DVD	
Aquaman	2018	United States	DC Comics	
Area 407	2012	United States		
A.R.O.G	2008	Turkey		
At the Earth's Core	1976	United Kingdom United States		
Attenborough and the Giant Dinosaur	2016	United Kingdom	Documentary	
Aztec Rex	2008	United States	Direct-to-DVD	
Baby: Secret of the Lost Legend	1985	United States		
Bakuryū Sentai Abaranger 20th: The Unforgivable Fury	2023	Japan	Super Sentai franchise	
Barney's Great Adventure	1998	United States	Barney & Friends	
Battle at Big Rock	2019	United States	Short film / Jurassic Park franchise	
The Beast from 20,000 Fathoms	1953	United States		
The Beast of Hollow Mountain	1956	United States		
Beneath Loch Ness	2001	United States		
Blackadder: Back & Forth	1999	United Kingdom	Short film	
Bringing Up Baby	1938	United States	Dinosaur skeletons only	
Brute Force	1914	United States	Possibly a Ceratosaurus, as it has a horn on its nose	
The Bubble	2022	United States		
Carnosaur	1993	United States		
Carnosaur 2	1995	United States		
Carnosaur 3: Primal Species	1996	United States		
Caveman	1981	United States		
Chicago World's Fair	1934	United States	Documentary	
Claw	2021	United States		
Cowboys vs Dinosaurs	2015	United States		
The Crater Lake Monster	1977	United States		
Creation	1931	United States		
David Attenborough's Natural History Museum Alive	2014	United Kingdom	Documentary	
Destroy All Monsters	1968	Japan	Godzilla franchise	
Dino Dana: The Movie	2020	Canada, United States		
Dinocroc	2004	United States	Godzilla parody	
Dinocroc vs. Supergator	2010	United States		
Dinosaur	2000	United States		
The Dinosaurs	2026	United States	Documentary	
Dinosaurs Alive!	2007	United States	Documentary	
Dinosaurs: The Final Day with David Attenborough	2022	United Kingdom	Documentary	
Dinosaur Babes	1996	United States		
Dinosaur from the Deep	1994	France		
Dinosaurs: Giants of Patagonia	2007	United States	Documentary	
Dinosaur Hotel	2021	United States		
Dinosaur Hotel 2	2022	United Kingdom		
Dinosaur Island	1994	United States		
Dinosaur Island	2014	Australia		
Dinosaur Prison	2023	United Kingdom		
The Dinosaur Project	2012	United Kingdom		
Dinosaurus!	1960	United States		
Dinosaurs, the Terrible Lizards	1970	United States	Short film	
Dinosaur Valley Girls	1996	United States		
Dinosaur World	2020	China, United States		
Dinoshark	2010	United States		
Dinotopia (miniseries)	2002	United States		
Doctor Strange in the Multiverse of Madness (briefly shown)	2022	United States		
Ebola Rex	2021	United States		
The Eden Formula	2006	United States		
The End of Oak Street	2026	United States	Feature film	
Evolution	1923	United States	Documentary	
Extinction: Jurassic Predators	2014	United Kingdom		
The Extraordinary Adventures of Adèle Blanc-Sec	2010	France		
Fig Leaves	1926	United States		
The Final Level: Escaping Rancala (Jurassic Island)	2019	United States		
The Flintstones	1994	United States		
The Flintstones in Viva Rock Vegas	2000	United States		
Flying Elephants	1928	United States		
Future War	1997	United States		
The Ghost of Slumber Mountain	1918	United States		
The Giant Behemoth	1959	United States, United Kingdom		
Ghidorah, the Three-Headed Monster	1964	Japan	Godzilla franchise	
Godzilla	1954	Japan	Godzilla franchise	(Note: A a Trilobite is briefly shown.)
Godzilla, King of the Monsters!	1956	United States	Godzilla franchise	(Note: A a Trilobite is briefly shown.)
Godzilla Raids Again	1955	Japan	Godzilla franchise	
Godzilla vs. King Ghidorah	1991	Japan	Godzilla franchise	
Godzilla vs. Mechagodzilla II	1993	Japan	Godzilla franchise	
Godzilla: Final Wars	2004	Japan	Godzilla franchise	
Hatched	2021	United States		
Herr Vinners stenåldersdröm	1924	Sweden		
House II: The Second Story	1987	United States		
Hunting Dinosaurs in the Badlands of Alberta	1925	Canada	Documentary	
In Those Good Old Days - Filmed at Crystal Palace	1922	United Kingdom	Documentary	
The Invisible Raptor	2023	United States		
Iron Sky: The Coming Race	2017	Finland		
It's Alive!	1969	United States		
Journey to the Beginning of Time	1955	Czechoslovakia		
Journey to the Center of the Earth	1959	United States		
Journey to the Center of the Earth	2008	United States		
Jurassic Attack	2010	United States		
Jurassic City	2015	United States		
The Jurassic Dead	2017	United States		
Jurassic Domination	2022	United States		
Jurassic Expedition	2018	United States		
Jurassic Galaxy	2018	United States		
The Jurassic Games	2018	United States	Direct-to-DVD	
Jurassic Hunt	2021	United States		
Jurassic Island	2022	United States		
Jurassic Park	1993	United States	Jurassic Park franchise	
Jurassic Park III	2001	United States	Jurassic Park franchise	
Jurassic Prey	2015	United States		
Jurassic Thunder	2019	United States		
Jurassic Valley	2022	United Kingdom		
Jurassic World	2015	United States	Jurassic Park franchise	
Jurassic World Dominion	2022	United States	Jurassic Park franchise	
Jurassic World: Fallen Kingdom	2018	United States	Jurassic Park franchise	
Jurassic World Rebirth	2025	United States	Jurassic Park franchise	
KillerSaurus	2015	United Kingdom		
Kingdom of the Dinosaurs	2022	United States		
King Dinosaur	1955	United States		
King Kong	1933	United States		
King Kong	2005	United States		
King Kong Escapes	1967	United States		
King of the Kongo	1929	United States	Film serial	
Kong: Skull Island	2017	United States	MonsterVerse	(Note: A Triceratops skull is briefly shown.)
Kontinental '25	2025	Romania		
Land of the Lost	2009	United States		
The Land That Time Forgot	1974	United Kingdom, United States		
The Land That Time Forgot	2009	United States		
The Land Unknown	1957	United States		
Last Day of the Dinosaurs	2010	United States	Documentary	
The Last Dinosaur	1977	Japan, United States		
The Last Dragon	2004	United Kingdom		
The Last Sharknado: It's About Time	2018	United States	Sharknado franchise	
Legend of Dinosaurs & Monster Birds	1977	Japan		
Loch Ness	1996	United States		
The Loch Ness Horror	1981	United States		
The Loch Ness Horror	2022	United Kingdom		
Loch Ness Terror	2008	United States		
Lost Continent	1951	United States		
Lost in Dinosaur World	1993	United States		
The Lost Whirl	1926	United States		
The Lost World	1925	United States		
The Lost World	1960	United States		
The Lost World	1992	United States		
The Lost World	1998	United States		
The Lost World	2001	United Kingdom		
The Lost World: Jurassic Park	1997	United States	Jurassic Park franchise	
Lucy (briefly shown)	2014	France		
Meg 2: The Trench (Briefly shown)	2023	United States		
Men in Black 3 (briefly shown)	2012	United States		
Monsters of the Past: Pathé Review	1923	United States	Documentary	
Monsters of the Past: The Story of the Great Dinosaurs	1922	United States	by Arthur Sterry Coggeshall	
Monster Planet of Godzilla	1994	Japan	Godzilla franchise	
My Pet Dinosaur	2017	Australia		
My Science Project	1985	United States		
Night at the Museum	2006	United States	Night at the Museum franchise	
Night at the Museum: Battle of the Smithsonian	2009	United States	Night at the Museum franchise	
Night at the Museum: Secret of the Tomb	2014	United States	Night at the Museum franchise	
On the Comet	1970	Czechoslovakia		
On the Town	1949	United States	Dinosaur skeletons only	
One Million B.C.	1940	United States		
One Million Years B.C.	1966	United Kingdom		
One of Our Dinosaurs Is Missing	1975	United Kingdom, United States		
Palm Springs	2020	United States		
The People That Time Forgot	1977	United Kingdom, United States		
Planet of Dinosaurs	1978	United States		
Planet Raptor	2007	United States, United Kingdom, Romania		
Planeta Bur	1962	Soviet Union		
Playin’ Hookey	1928	United States		
Poseidon Rex	2013	United States	Direct-to-DVD	
Power Rangers	2017	United States		
Prehistoric Animals	1938	United States	Documentary	
Prehistoric Beast	1985	United States		
Prehistoric Peeps	1905	United Kingdom		
Prehysteria!	1993	United States		
Prehysteria! 2	1994	United States		
Prehysteria! 3	1995	United States		
Primitive War	2025	Australia		
Pterodactyl	2005	United States		
Raptor	2001	United States		
Raptor Island	2004	United States		
Raptor Ranch	2012	United States		
Ready Player One	2018	United States		
Rebirth of Mothra III	1998	Japan		
Reptiloid	2013	Croatia		
Return to the Lost World	1992	Canada		
Revenge of the Lost	2017	United States		
Rise of the Dinosaurs	2013	United States		
Rise of the Jurassic	2022	China		
Rodan	1956	Japan	Godzilla franchise	
Scooby-Doo 2: Monsters Unleashed	2004	United States		
Sea Monsters: A Prehistoric Adventure	2007	United States		
Sea Monsters: A Walking With Dinosaurs Trilogy	2003	United Kingdom	Documentary	
The Secret of the Loch	1934	United Kingdom		
Sherlock Holmes	2010	United States		
Snake 3: Dinosaur vs. Python	2022	China		
Son of Kong	1933	United States		
Sonic the Hedgehog	2020	United States		
A Sound of Thunder	2005	United Kingdom, United States, Germany, Czech Republic		
Super Mario Bros.	1993	United States	Based on video game of the same name	
T-Rex: Back to the Cretaceous	1998	United States		
Tammy and the T-Rex	1994	United States		
Terror of Mechagodzilla	1975	Japan	Godzilla franchise	
Theodore Rex	1995	United States		
Three Ages	1923	United States		
Timescape: Back to the Dinosaurs	2023	Canada		
Transformers: Age of Extinction	2014	United States	Transformers franchise	
Transformers: The Last Knight	2017	United States	Transformers franchise	
The Tree of Life	2011	United States		
Triassic Attack	2010	United States		
Triassic Hunt	2021	United States		
Triassic World	2018	United States		
Two Lost Worlds	1950	United States		
Tyranno's Claw	1994	South Korea	Feature film	
Uit Den Schoot Der Aarde	1919	The Netherlands	Documentary	
Unknown Island	1948	United States		
Untamed Women	1952	United States		
The Valley of Gwangi	1969	United States		
Valley of the Dragons	1961	United States		
The VelociPastor	2017	United States		
Voyage to the Prehistoric Planet	1965	United States		
Voyage of Time	2016	United States		
Walking with Dinosaurs: The 3D Movie	2013	United Kingdom, United States, Australia, India		
Warbirds	2008	United States	TV film	
When Dinosaurs Ruled the Earth	1970	United Kingdom, United States		
Where Time Began	1978	Spain		
Wicked Science	2004	Australia		
The Wiggles Movie	1997	Australia	The Wiggles	
The Witches Cave	1989	Soviet Union, Czechoslovakia		
Wunder der Schöpfung	1925	Germany	Documentary	
Xtinction: Predator X	2010	United States		

== Animated films ==
Title	Year	Country	Type	Ref.
Adam Raises Cain	1920	United States		
Age of the Great Dinosaurs	1979	Japan	2D animation	
Allegro non troppo	1976	Italy	2D animation	
Alpha and Omega: Dino Digs	2016	United States	CGI Animation	
The Arctic Giant	1942	United States	2D animation	
Atlantis: The Lost Empire	2001	United States	Hand-drawn animation	
Back to the Jurassic	2015	United States	CGI Animation	
Bambi Meets Godzilla	1969	Canada	2D animation, short	
Betty Boop’s Museum	1932	United States	2D animation	
The Bonehead Age	1925	United States	2D animation	
The Cave Man	1934	United States	2D animation	
Crayon Shin-chan the Movie: Our Dinosaur Diary	2024	Japan	2D animation	
Daffy Duck and the Dinosaur	1939	United States	2D animation	
Dino King 3D: Journey to Fire Mountain	2018	South Korea, China	CGI animation	
Dino Mecard Theater Edition: The Island Of Tinysaur	2019	South Korea, Germany, Japan, Russia	CGI animation non disney movie	
Dino Time	2012	South Korea	CGI animation	
Dinosaur	2000	United States	CGI animation	
Dinosaur Island	2002	United States	2D animation	
Dinosaur	1980	United States	Stop-motion animation	
The Dinosaur and the Missing Link: A Prehistoric Tragedy	1915	United States	Stop-motion animation	
Dinotopia: Quest for the Ruby Sunstone	2005	United States	2D animation	
Diplodocus	1915	United States	2D animation	
Diplodocus	2024	Poland, Czech Republic, Slovakia	3D animation	
Doraemon: Nobita and the Knights of Dinosaurs	1987	Japan	2D animation	
Doraemon: Nobita's Dinosaur	1980	Japan	2D animation	
Doraemon: Nobita's Dinosaur 2006	2006	Japan	2D animation	
Doraemon: Nobita's New Dinosaur	2020	Japan	2D animation	
Early Man	2018	United Kingdom	Stop-motion	
The Egg Hunt	1940	United States	2D animation	
Ein Rückblick in die Urwelt	1927	Germany		
Epic	1984	Australia	2D animation	
Fantasia - Rite of Spring	1940	United States	2D animation	
Farmer Al Falfa's Ape Girl	1932	United States	2D animation	
Felix in the Bone Age	1922	United States	2D animation	
Felix Trifles With Time	1925	United States	2D animation	
Fireman! Save My Child!	1921	United States		
The First Circus	1921	United States		
A Flintstones Christmas Carol	1994	United States	2D animation	
The Flintstones: On the Rocks	2001	United States	2D animation (+stop-motion sequence)	
Gertie on Tour	1921	United States	2D animation	
Gertie the Dinosaur	1914	United States	2D animation & live action	
The Good Dinosaur	2015	United States	CGI animation	
Granite Hotel	1940	United States	2D animation	
Hollyrock-a-Bye Baby	1993	United States	2D animation	
Ice Age	2002	United States	CGI animation	
Ice Age: The Meltdown	2006	United States	CGI animation	
Ice Age: Dawn of the Dinosaurs	2009	United States	CGI animation	
Ice Age: Continental Drift	2012	United States	CGI animation	
Ice Age: Collision Course	2016	United States	CGI animation	
The Ice Age Adventures of Buck Wild	2022	United States	CGI animation	
The Jetsons Meet the Flintstones	1987	United States	2D animation	
Journey to the Center of the Earth (GoodTimes Entertainment)	1996	Canada	2D animation	
Jurassic Bark	2018	United States	CGI Animation	
Jurassic Planet: The Mighty Kingdom	2021	United States	CGI Animation	
King Klunk	1933	United States	2D animation	
The Land Before Time	1988	United States, Ireland	2D animation, The Land Before Time franchise	
The Land Before Time II: The Great Valley Adventure	1994	United States	2D animation, The Land Before Time franchise	
The Land Before Time III: The Time of the Great Giving	1995	United States	2D animation, The Land Before Time franchise	
The Land Before Time IV: Journey Through the Mists	1996	United States	2D animation, The Land Before Time franchise	
The Land Before Time V: The Mysterious Island	1997	United States	2D animation, The Land Before Time franchise	
The Land Before Time VI: The Secret of Saurus Rock	1998	United States	2D animation, The Land Before Time franchise	
The Land Before Time VII: The Stone of Cold Fire	2000	United States	2D animation, The Land Before Time franchise	
The Land Before Time VIII: The Big Freeze	2001	United States	2D animation, The Land Before Time franchise	
The Land Before Time IX: Journey to Big Water	2002	United States	2D animation, The Land Before Time franchise	
The Land Before Time X: The Great Longneck Migration	2003	United States	2D animation, The Land Before Time franchise	
The Land Before Time XI: Invasion of the Tinysauruses	2005	United States	2D animation, The Land Before Time franchise	
The Land Before Time XII: The Great Day of the Flyers	2006	United States	2D animation, The Land Before Time franchise	
The Land Before Time XIII: The Wisdom of Friends	2007	United States	2D animation, The Land Before Time franchise	
The Land Before Time XIV: Journey of the Brave	2016	United States	2D animation, The Land Before Time franchise	
The Lego Batman Movie	2017	United States		
The Lego Movie 2: The Second Part	2019	United States		
Little Nemo: Adventures in Slumberland	1989	Japan, United States		
The Man Called Flintstone	1966	United States	2D animation	
Marco Polo Junior Versus the Red Dragon	1972	Australia	2D animation	
Meet the Robinsons	2007	United States	CGI animation	
The Mighty Kong	1998	United States, South Korea	2D animation	
Minions	2015	United States	CGI animation	
The Missing Link	1980	Belgium, France	2D animation	
Missing Link	2019	United States	Stop-motion animation	
Noah's Outing	1932	United States	2D animation	
The Original Movie	1922	United States		
Paw Patrol: The Dino Movie	2026	Canada	CGI animation	
Prehistoric Porky	1940	United States	2D Animation	
Prehistoric Poultry	1917	United States	Stop-motion animation	
Pre-Hysterical Man	1948	United States	2D animation	
Quasi at the Quackadero	1975	United States	2D animation	
R.F.D., 10,000 B.C.	1917	United States	Stop-motion animation	
Scooby-Doo and the Cyber Chase	2001	United States, Japan	2D animation	
Scooby-Doo! Legend of the Phantosaur	2011	United States	2D animation	
So This is Eden	1925	United States	2D animation & live action	
Speckles: The Tarbosaurus	2012	South Korea	CGI animation	
Spider-Man: Across the Spider-Verse	2023	United States	CGI animation	
The Stone Age Error	1932	United States	2D animation	
Stone Age Stunts	1930	United States	2D animation	
The Stone Age	1931	United States	2D animation	
The Super Mario Bros. Movie	2023	United States	CGI animation	
The Super Mario Galaxy Movie	2026	United States	CGI animation	
Tekken: The Motion Picture	1998	Japan	Based on the video game franchise of the same name	
Tarzan	2013	Germany	CGI animation	
Tom and Jerry and the Wizard of Oz	2011	United States	2D animation	
Toy Story	1995	United States	CGI animation	
Toy Story 2	1999	United States	CGI animation	
Toy Story 3	2010	United States	CGI animation	
Toy Story 4	2019	United States	CGI animation	
Toy Story That Time Forgot	2014	United States	CGI animation, TV film	
Toy Story Toons: Partysaurus Rex	2012	United States	CGI animation, short	
Till the Sun Sets	2025	United Kingdom	2D Animation	
Transformers: The Movie	1986	United States	2D animation	
Turok: Son of Stone	2008	United States	2D animation	
The Visible Compendium	1991	United States		
Vor 50 Millionen Jahren	1924	Germany	Stop-motion animation	
We're Back! A Dinosaur's Story	1993	United States, United Kingdom	2D animation	
When Men Were Men	1925	United States	2D animation	
Why Adam Walked the Floor	1922	United States		
Why They Love Cavemen	1921	United States		
Wreck-It Ralph	2012	United States	CGI animation	
You Are Umasou	2010	Japan	2D animation	

== See also ==
- Cultural depictions of dinosaurs
  - Stegosaurus in popular culture
  - Tyrannosaurus in popular culture
  - Velociraptor in popular culture
- Dinosaurs in Jurassic Park
- List of films about animals
- List of films featuring giant monsters
- Dinosaurs (1991-1994 TV series)
