= Dinosaurs, the Terrible Lizards =

1970 film by Wah Cheng

Dinosaurs, the Terrible Lizards is an American stop-motion animated film. It is directed and produced by Wah Cheng with the narration script written by Aylsworth Kleihaur and Ruth S. Zick. The technical consultant is Dr. J. R. Macdonald; it is animated by Douglas Beswick and edited by Stuart O’Brien. The eight-minute long film was released twice, once in 1970 following the Kleihaur script and again in 1986 edited with the Zick script. The film was distributed by AIMS, Instructional Media Services, in both the 1970 and the revised 1986 version.

The film was featured in Hewy's Animated Movie Reviews: The Top 10 Animated Dinosaur Documentaries in 2011.

== Inaccuracies ==
The film's estimation is off by a couple million years both in its extinction date and its oldest dinosaur fossil date. Dinosaurs, the Terrible Lizards says that the oldest dinosaur fossils are about 225 million years old when, as of 2024, a 233 million-year-old dinosaur fossil was found in Brazil. The film says that dinosaurs went extinct 70 million years ago but there have been fossils found from 65 million years ago.

The most glaring inaccuracy is the dinosaurs' lack of feathers. This was due to concrete evidence of feathers being unknown until the late 1980s and speculations about some species being feathered wasn't common until the later 1970s.

While it is true that dinosaurs may have depended on their surroundings to maintain a constant homeostasis, this is not thought to be true of all dinosaurs as the film suggests.

The maximum length of a Tyrannosaurus fossil found indicates that they could grow up to 40 feet and 20 feet tall, not as the film states (50 feet long and 18 feet tall).

The film states three possible dinosaur extinction events where the dinosaurs either went extinct due to climate change, that their food sources became inadequate, or the possibility of mammals eating the dinosaurs’ eggs. While those options may be true in part for some species of dinosaur, the present theory of the dinosaurs’ extinction event is that an asteroid impact with Earth provided a much more abrupt departure. The asteroid impact hypothesis was codified until 1980, after the initial production of the documentary.

== See also ==
- List of films featuring dinosaurs

== Citations ==
“Dinosaurs, the Terrible Lizards.” IMDb, https://m.imdb.com/title/tt1505115/. Accessed 6 Oct. 2024.

“‘Oldest EVER’ dinosaur fossil found in Brazil.” BBC, 8 Aug. 2024, https://www.bbc.co.uk/newsround/articles/c3vxkq05vzgo

“Last dinosaur before mass extinction discovered.” Science Daily, 13 Jul. 2011, https://www.sciencedaily.com/releases/2011/07/110712211016.htm

Ashworth, James. “Dinosaurs may have evolved from a warm-blooded ancestor” Natural History Museum, 25 May 2022, https://www.nhm.ac.uk/discover/news/2022/may/dinosaurs-may-have-evolved-from-warm-blooded-ancestor.html

“7 Questions about Tyrannosaurus rex.” American Museum of Natural History, https://www.amnh.org/dinosaurs/tyrannosaurus-rex. Accessed 6 Oct. 2024

Rae, Sam and Hendry Lisa. “What killed the dinosaurs?” Museum of Natural History, https://www.nhm.ac.uk/discover/dinosaur-extinction.html. Accessed 6 Oct. 2024
