= Prehistoric Beast =

- Prehistoric Beast's rerelease online poster (Tippett Studio, 2011 for the poster and rerelease)
- Directed by: Phil Tippett
- Written by: Phil Tippett
- Produced by: Phil Tippett
- Cinematography: Phil Tippett; Terry Chostner
- Edited by: Julie Roman
- Music by: Mark Adler
- Production company: Tippett Studio
- Release date: 1984
- Running time: 10 minutes
- Country: United States

Prehistoric Beast is a 1984 American experimental animated short film conceived, supervised and directed by Phil Tippett. This sequence is the first film produced by the Tippett Studio, founded by Tippett. Made with the go motion animation technique, scenes from Prehistoric Beast were included in the 1985 full-length documentary Dinosaur!, first aired on CBS in the United States on November 5, 1985. In April 2011, the Tippett Studio had published on its YouTube official channel a digital restoration of the short.

== Synopsis ==
Set 65 million years ago in what is now the Canadian province of Alberta, this short film depicts the chase and predation of a Monoclonius (sometimes synonymous with Centrosaurus) by a Tyrannosaurus rex (or a closely related genus like Gorgosaurus, Albertosaurus or Daspletosaurus).

== Plot ==
The short opens with a tracking shot in the middle of a Late Cretaceous forest at night. A Tyrannosaurus rex is busy eating and finishing an Edmontosaurus carcass. The next morning, a herd of Monoclonius is seen grazing. One member wanders into the forest to find more food. It finds a field of flowers and begins grazing. It wanders further in and starts to be hunted by the same Tyrannosaurus rex.

The Tyrannosaurus rex steps on a twig, which makes the Monoclonius wary. The Monoclonius lets out a trumpet to signal the herd, then, in a hopeful attempt to find it, keeps walking deeper into the forest. It soon stumbles upon the remains of the Edmontosaurus that was killed by the Tyrannosaurus rex. While the Monoclonius ponders over the carcass, the Tyrannosaurus rex sneaks up from behind.

The Tyrannosaurus rex begins the battle by attacking the Monoclonius and biting hard on its back. The Monoclonius manages to break free from its enemy's jaws and gores the Tyrannosaurus rex in its shin with its nasal horn. This enrages the Tyrannosaurus which then corners the Monoclonius near some trees. The Monoclonius lets out one last cry before it is presumably killed. The Monoclonius herd calls out for their missing member, unaware that it has been killed. The Tyrannosaurus rex is last seen trying to find a place to sleep and digest its meal.

== Production ==
Prehistoric Beast was only released in specialized animation festivals, but it convinced Robert Guenette and Steven Paul Mark to request Tippett's skills in order to transform it in a full-length documentary. They then asked Tippett to realize new sequences with other dinosaur species, and the Prehistoric Beast material was added to the new one, resulting on Dinosaur! in 1985. Tippett had already participated in The Empire Strikes Back (1980), animating the tauntauns seen in the film, and his experimental work on Prehistoric Beast and Dinosaur! served to the animated dinosaurs sequences he made some years later for Jurassic Park (1993).

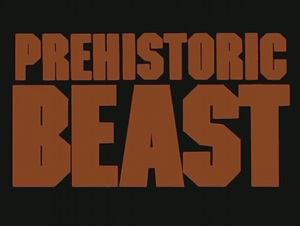
Prehistoric Beast's logo

As with the subsequent documentary Dinosaur!, Phil Tippett, while making Prehistoric Beast, received assistance from ILM stop-motion animators Randy Dutra (who made the dinosaur molds and skins) and Tom St. Amand (who made the inner articulated metallic skeletons of the dinosaurs).

In the 1933 film King Kong, a Stegosaurus attacks the film characters and after having killed it by gun fire one of the characters identifies it as being "a prehistoric beast". This line, taken from the film, inspired Phil Tippett when giving a title to his 1984 animated short film. An excerpt from this King Kong scene is shown in the final 1985 documentary Dinosaur!, as a reference to Prehistoric Beast, the short sequence by which it was preceded.

== See also ==
- List of films featuring dinosaurs
