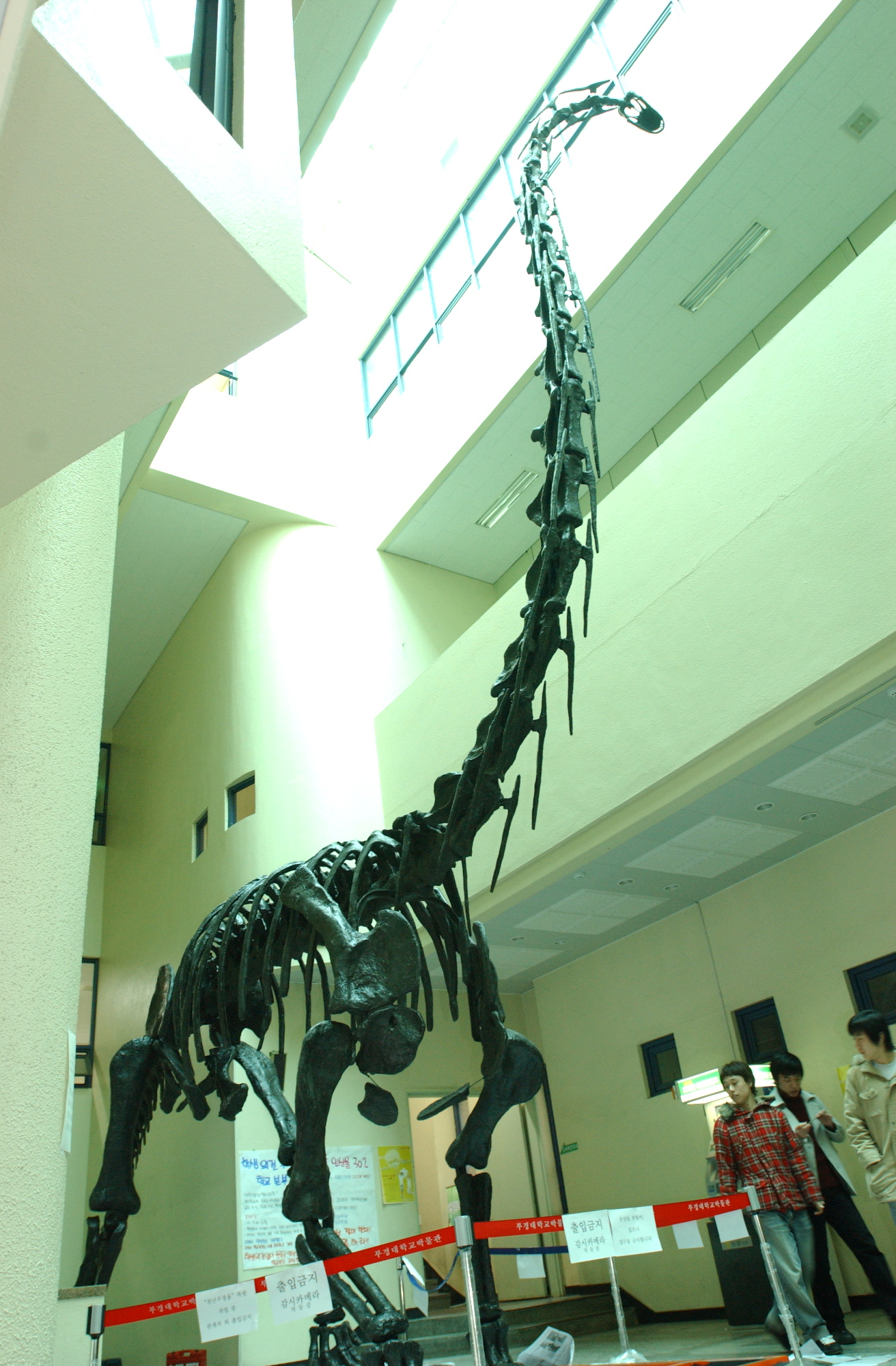
- Reconstructed skeleton of Pukyongosaurus in the Pukyong National University

Scientific classification
- Kingdom: Animalia
- Phylum: Chordata
- Class: Reptilia
- Clade: Dinosauria
- Clade: Saurischia
- Clade: †Sauropodomorpha
- Clade: †Sauropoda
- Clade: †Macronaria
- Clade: †Somphospondyli
- Genus: †Pukyongosaurus; Dong et al., 2001

Type species
- Pukyongosaurus millenniumi Dong et al., 2001

= Pukyongosaurus =

Pukyongosaurus Temporal range: Aptian-Albian ~118.0–112.4 Ma

Extinct genus of dinosaurs

Pukyongosaurus (meaning "Pukyong lizard", after the Pukyong National University) is a genus of titanosauriform dinosaur that lived in South Korea during the Early Cretaceous Period (Aptian - Albian). It may have been closely related to Euhelopus, and is known from a series of vertebrae in the neck and back. The characteristics that were originally used to distinguish this genus have been criticized as being either widespread or too poorly preserved to evaluate, rendering the genus an indeterminate nomen dubium among titanosauriforms. A 2022 study noted that Pukyongosaurus is probably a somphospondylan.

== Discovery ==
In 2000, several fragments of a sauropod skeleton were discovered in the Hasandong Formation in Hadong County, South Korea. One of the caudal vertebrae ascribed to Pukyongosaurus has bite marks from theropod teeth.
