= Phil Tippett =

American film director (born 1951)

- Tippett in 2015
- Born: September 27, 1951 (age 75); Berkeley, California, U.S.
- Occupations: Animator, visual effects supervisor and producer, and filmmaker

Phil Tippett (born September 27, 1951) is an American animator, visual effects supervisor and producer, and filmmaker. Over his career, he has assisted Industrial Light & Magic and DreamWorks, and in 1984 formed his own company, Tippett Studio.

His work has appeared in movies such as the original Star Wars trilogy, Jurassic Park, and RoboCop. In 2021, he released his long-gestating, primarily stop-motion film Mad God, which was funded through Kickstarter and distributed by Shudder.

== Early life ==
Phil Tippett was born on September 27, 1951, in Berkeley, California. When he was seven years old, he saw the film The 7th Voyage of Sinbad, and was struck by Ray Harryhausen's stop-motion special effects. He soon began teaching himself how to create stop-motion animations at home.

After completing a bachelor's degree in art at the University of California, Irvine in 1974, he went to work at the Cascade Pictures animation studio in nearby Los Angeles.

== Career ==
=== Stop motion ===
In 1975, while still working at Cascade Pictures, Tippett and Jon Berg were hired by George Lucas at Industrial Light & Magic to create a stop-motion holographic chess scene for the original Star Wars film. When Star Wars was being released in theatres, in 1977, Joe Dante and Jon Davison approached Tippett to create the fish for Roger Corman's Piranha. It was released in 1978, with a credit.

In 1978, Tippett headed the ILM animation department with Jon Berg for The Empire Strikes Back, released in 1980. For this film, Tippett co-developed the animation technique called go motion to animate the sinister AT-AT Imperial Walkers and the hybrid alien tauntauns. In 1981, he continued using go motion for Dragonslayer, and received his first Academy Award nomination for its dragon animation. By 1983, Tippett led the famed Lucasfilm creature shop for Return of the Jedi, for which he won his first Oscar in 1984.

In 1984, Tippett Studio was born when Tippett left ILM and set up a studio in his garage to create a 10-minute experimental film, Prehistoric Beast. The realism of the dinosaurs it depicted and the film's reflection of contemporary scientific theory led to the 1985 CBS animated documentary Dinosaur!. The next year, in 1986, Dinosaur! earned Tippett Studio its first award, a Primetime Emmy Award for Outstanding Special Visual Effects.

In the 1986 movie Howard the Duck, he modeled the Dark Overlord creatures. The same year, producer Jon Davison hired Tippett to create the animated robot sequences for RoboCop. The ED-209 stop-motion model was animated by Tippett but designed by Craig Hayes (also known as Craig Davies), who also built the full size models. As one of the setpieces of the movie, the ED-209's look and animated sequences were under the close supervision of director Paul Verhoeven, who sometimes acted out the robot's movements himself. ED-209 was voiced by producer Jon Davison. The project became the start of a long and successful collaboration between Davies and Tippett.

Tippett also did stop motion work for the 2024 TV show Star Wars: Skeleton Crew.

=== Computer-generated effects ===
In 1991, Tippett was hired to create the dinosaur effects for the Steven Spielberg blockbuster Jurassic Park using his go motion technique made famous in the film Dragonslayer. However, animator Steve “Spaz” Williams - part of the CGI team at Industrial Light & Magic - created animated test footage of a T. rex that Spielberg loved.

When Tippett was told that Jurassic Park dinosaurs would be computer-generated, he was shocked, exclaiming "I've just become extinct", a line Spielberg borrows and uses in the movie. Far from being extinct, Tippett evolved as stop-motion animation gave way to computer-generated imagery or CGI. Because of Tippett's background and understanding of animal movement and behavior, Spielberg kept Tippett on to supervise the animation on 50 dinosaur shots for Jurassic Park. Tippett supervised both the Tippett Studio and ILM animators, resulting in realistic digital dinosaurs that breathe, flex, twitch and react. His effort earned him a second Oscar.

Work done on Jurassic Park resulted in the development by Tippett Studio's Craig Hayes of the DID (Dinosaur Input Device - as described by ILM in Disney+ documentary Light & Magic, S1 episode 6) which was pivotal in the transition from stop motion to computer generated animation in bringing creatures to life. Tippett is also the subject of a humorous internet meme regarding his credit in the film ("Dinosaur Supervisor"), which is displayed with the tagline "One job, Phil! You had one job!", implying that because he didn't supervise the dinosaurs properly, he was responsible for the on-screen deaths. Mashable interviewed Tippett in April 2014 about this meme, which he called "beyond silly" and "such a waste of time".

In June 2015, after media attention due to his new credit of "Dinosaur Consultant" in Jurassic World and the ensuing deaths in the film, Tippett tweeted: "to be fair, there were a lot of dinosaurs. It was a large job."

In 1995, Tippett Studio was hired to create the giant, hostile alien arachnids in Paul Verhoeven's adaptation of Robert A. Heinlein's classic science fiction novel Starship Troopers. Tippett marshaled a team of 100 animators, model makers, computer artists and technicians and expanded his all-CGI facility. Because of the intensity of his involvement, and his ability to pre-visualize the hordes of teeming arachnids, Verhoeven has credited Tippett with co-directing the large-scale battle sequences for the film. The excellence of this work resulted in Tippett's sixth nomination in 1997 for an Academy Award.

During 1997–98, Tippett supervised animation and effects for Universal's Virus and Disney's My Favorite Martian. In 1998–99 he and Craig Hayes co-supervised the visual effects on Jan De Bont's The Haunting, for DreamWorks. Under Tippett and Hayes' lead, Tippett Studio created over 100 complex effects shots that expressed the horrific character of the house and the spirits that live there.

In 2000, Tippett joined director Ivan Reitman as the visual effects supervisor on the DreamWorks science fiction comedy Evolution. In just under a year, Tippett Studio designed, realized and animated over 17 extraterrestrial creatures in 175 shots.

Throughout 2001 and into 2002, Tippett changed direction to focus on developing and directing his own film. Tippett achieved this with Starship Troopers 2: Hero of the Federation, by partnering with his longtime associates, writer Ed Neumeier and producer Jon Davison, with whom he worked on the original Starship Troopers and Robocop.

=== Mad God ===
In 1990, Tippett began work on an independent animated film, Mad God; but as he became involved in establishing his own studio, he set the project aside. He returned to the project in 2010, but did not have the budget to complete it, so he started a Kickstarter with a goal of $40,000. On June 16, 2012, the project was successfully funded, exceeding the goal and obtaining $124,156.

The film was first screened December 11, 2021 and continued screening through mid-2022. It took 30 years to complete. A year before it was finished, Tippett had a mental breakdown, causing him to be admitted to a psychiatric ward.

=== Pequin’s Pendequin ===
Tippett said in 2021 that he was working on a project called Pequin’s Pendequin, a story about a shapeshifter which is influenced by 1940s Warner Brothers cartoons, but with a dark side to it. He has also written two sequels.

=== Sentinel ===
In May 2024, Tippett revealed his next project, Sentinel, a stop-motion war film he was pitching at that year's Marché du Film. The film would allow Tippett to “make something that has the whole history of VFX in it, from stop-motion to digital and now AI”. The Sentinel team will use internally-trained AI models in the film's production.

== Personal life ==
Tippett is married to film producer Jules Roman. He and his wife have two daughters, one of whom, Maya Tippett, is an Emmy-winning film editor.

Tippett has struggled with depression and anxiety, and has said that animating provides him a therapeutic effect. He suffered a mental breakdown and was admitted to a psychiatric hospital for a week while working on Mad God, and was subsequently diagnosed with bipolar disorder.

In 2026, Tippett announced the closure of Tippett Studio's Berkeley, California, location. The closure came after he filed for Chapter 11 bankruptcy and auctioned off many of his props. Tippett stated that the studio's location in Toronto, Canada, will continue operations.

== Awards and nominations ==
Year	Organisation	Work	Award	Notes	Result	Ref.
2024	Imagine Film Festival	—	Career Achievement Award	—	Honored	
2022	Ray Harryhausen Awards	—	Harryhausen Hall of Fame	—	Honored	
1998	70th Academy Awards	Starship Troopers	Best Visual Effects	with Scott E. Anderson, Alec Gillis and John Richardson	Nominated	
1997	69th Academy Awards	Dragonheart	Best Visual Effects	with Scott Squires, James Straus and Kit West	Nominated	
1993	66th Academy Awards	Jurassic Park	Best Visual Effects	with Dennis Muren, Stan Winston and Michael Lantieri	Won	
1993	47th BAFTAs	Jurassic Park	Best Special Visual Effects	with Dennis Muren, Stan Winston and Michael Lantieri	Won	
1988	61st Academy Awards	Willow	Best Visual Effects	with Richard Edlund, Dennis Muren and Ken Ralston	Nominated	
1988	42nd BAFTAs	RoboCop	Best Special Visual Effects	with Rob Bottin, Peter Kuran, and Rocco Gioffre	Nominated	
1988	15th Saturn Awards	RoboCop	Best Special Effects	with Rob Bottin, Peter Kuran, and Rocco Gioffre	Won	
1986	38th Primetime Emmy Awards	Dinosaur!	Outstanding Special Visual Effects		Won	
1984	56th Academy Awards	Return of the Jedi	Special Achievement Award for Visual Effects	with Richard Edlund, Dennis Muren and Ken Ralston	Won	
1982	54th Academy Awards	Dragonslayer	Best Visual Effects	with Dennis Muren, Ken Ralston and Brian Johnson	Nominated	

== Selected filmography ==
Year	Title	Animation	Visual effects	Consultant	Director	Notes
1977	The Crater Lake Monster	No	No	No	No	Miniatures building (uncredited)
1977	Star Wars	Yes	No	No	No	Stop-motion
1978	Piranha	No	Yes	No	No	Creature design Creature animation Model construction (uncredited)
1980	The Empire Strikes Back	Yes	No	No	No	Go-motion
1981	Dragonslayer	Yes	No	No	No	Go-motion
1983	Return of the Jedi	No	No	No	No	Makeup design
1984	Indiana Jones and the Temple of Doom	No	No	Yes	No	Effects creative consultant
1984	Prehistoric Beast	Yes	No	No	Yes	Short film, go-motion
1985	Dinosaur!	Yes	No	No	No	Documentary film, go-motion
1986	Howard the Duck	Yes	No	No	No	Go-motion supervisor: ILM visual effects unit
1987	RoboCop	Yes	No	No	No	ED-209 go-motion shots
1988	Willow	Yes	No	No	No	Two-headed dragon go-motion sequence
1989	Honey, I Shrunk the Kids	No	Yes	No	No	Creature design
1990	RoboCop 2	Yes	No	No	No	Go-motion animation
1993	Jurassic Park	No	Yes	No	No	Dinosaur supervisor
1993	Coneheads	Yes	No	No	No	Creature animation
1996	Dragonheart	No	Yes	No	No	Dragon design
1997	Starship Troopers	No	Yes	No	No	Creature visuals
2001	Evolution	No	Yes	No	No	Visual effects supervisor
2004	Starship Troopers 2: Hero of the Federation	No	No	No	Yes	Television film for Encore Action
2008	The Spiderwick Chronicles	Yes	No	No	No	Animation supervisor
2009	The Twilight Saga: New Moon	No	Yes	No	No	Visual effects supervisor
2010	The Twilight Saga: Eclipse	No	Yes	No	No	Visual effects supervisor
2011	MutantLand	Yes	Yes	Yes	Yes	Short film, also writer
2011	The Twilight Saga: Breaking Dawn – Part 1	No	Yes	No	No	Visual effects supervisor
2012	The Twilight Saga: Breaking Dawn – Part 2	No	No	Yes	No	Visual effects supervisor
2015	Jurassic World	No	No	Yes	No	Dinosaur consultant
2015	Star Wars: The Force Awakens	Yes	No	No	No	Millennium Falcon chess scene supervisor
2018	Jurassic World: Fallen Kingdom	No	No	Yes	No	Dinosaur consultant
2021	Mad God	Yes	Yes	Yes	Yes	
2024	Alien: Romulus	Yes	No	No	No	Stop motion rat
2025	Dead Souls	Yes	No	No	No	Stop motion flashback scene
TBA	Sentinel	Yes	Yes	Yes	Yes	
