= Go motion =

Animation technique

Go motion is a variation of stop motion animation which incorporates motion blur into each frame involving motion. It was co-developed by Industrial Light & Magic and Phil Tippett. Stop motion animation can create a distinctive and disorienting staccato effect because the animated object is perfectly sharp in every frame, since each frame is shot with the object perfectly still. Real moving objects in similar scenes have motion blur because they move while the camera's shutter is open. Filmmakers use a variety of techniques to simulate motion blur, such as moving the model slightly during the exposure of each film frame, or placing a glass plate smeared with petroleum jelly in front of the camera lens to blur the moving areas.

== History ==
In the 1920s, Ladislas Starevich started using this technique by the time he started making films in France. He moved the puppet or the set during the exposure of the frame to create motion blur. Some of this can be seen in films like The Midnight Wedding, Love in Black and White, The Voice of the Nightingale or The Little Parade and more extensively in the battle scene of The Queen of the Butterflies (1924) and The Mascot (1933).

Phil Tippett and Industrial Light & Magic later recreated the go motion technique for some shots of the tauntaun creatures and AT-AT walkers in the 1980 Star Wars film The Empire Strikes Back. After that, go motion was used for many other movies: for the dragon in Dragonslayer (1981), the dinosaurs in the prehistoric documentaries Prehistoric Beast (1984) and Dinosaur! (1985), the wings of the harpies in Young Sherlock Holmes (1985), the lord demon creature in Howard the Duck (1986), the winged demon in The Golden Child (1986), the extraterrestrial living flying machines in Batteries Not Included (1987), and the two-headed Eborsisk dragon in Willow (1988). The last film using go motion was Coneheads (1993). Other minor sequences using go motion appeared in films like the first three Indiana Jones installments (1981–1989) and E.T. the Extra-Terrestrial (1982).

With the completion of Jurassic Park (1993), Tippett Studio abandoned go motion and fully converted its teams and equipment to CG computer-graphics.

== Methods for creating motion blur ==
=== Petroleum jelly ===
This crude but reasonably effective technique, known as vaselensing, involves smearing petroleum jelly ("Vaseline") on a plate of glass in front of the camera lens, then cleaning and reapplying it after each shot—a time-consuming process, but one which creates a blur around the model. The technique was used for the endoskeleton in The Terminator, by Jim Danforth to blur the pterodactyl's wings in Hammer Films' When Dinosaurs Ruled the Earth, and by Randal William Cook on the "terror dogs" sequence in Ghostbusters.

=== Bumping the puppet ===
Gently bumping or flicking the puppet before taking the frame produces a slight blur; however, care must be taken that the puppet does not move too much, and that props or set pieces are not moved so that the final product looks smooth.

=== Moving the table ===
Moving the table on which the model is standing while the film is being exposed creates a slight, realistic blur. This technique was developed by Ladislas Starevich: when the characters ran, he moved the set in the opposite direction. This is seen in The Little Parade when the ballerina is chased by the devil. Starevich also used this technique on his films The Eyes of the Dragon, The Magical Clock and The Mascot. Aardman Animations used this for the train chase in The Wrong Trousers and again during the lorry chase in A Close Shave. In both cases the cameras were moved physically during a 1-2 second exposure. The technique was revived for the full-length Wallace & Gromit: The Curse of the Were-Rabbit.

=== Go motion ===
The most sophisticated technique was originally developed for the film The Empire Strikes Back and used for some shots of the tauntauns and was later used on films like Dragonslayer and is quite different from traditional stop motion. The model is essentially a rod puppet. The rods are attached to motors which are linked to a computer that can record the movements as the model is traditionally animated. When enough movements have been made, the model is reset to its original position, the camera rolls and the model is moved across the table. Because the model is moving during shots, motion blur is created.

A variation of go motion was used in E.T. the Extra-Terrestrial to partially animate the children on their bicycles.

== Go motion today ==
Go motion was originally planned to be used extensively for the dinosaurs in Jurassic Park, until Steven Spielberg decided to try out the swiftly developing techniques of CG instead.

Today, the mechanical method of achieving motion blur using go motion is rarely used, as it is more complicated, slow, and labor-intensive than computer generated effects. However, the motion blurring technique still has potential in real stop motion movies where the puppet's motions are supposed to be somewhat realistic. Many professional visual effects applications now allow for motion blur to be simulated in post production.

== See also ==
- Tippett Studio

== Works cited ==
- Smith, Thomas G. (1986). Industrial Light & Magic: The Art of Special Effects. New York: Ballantine Books. ISBN 0-345-32263-0.
- Sawicki, Mark (2010). Animating with Stop Motion Pro. Focal Press. ISBN 978-0-240-81219-9.
