= Dinosaur! (1985 film) =

- Opening credits
- Written by: Steven Paul Mark
- Directed by: Robert Guenette
- Presented by: Christopher Reeve
- Country of origin: United States
- Original language: English

Production
- Executive producers: Robert Guenette; Steven Paul Mark
- Cinematography: Philip Hurn
- Running time: 60 minutes
- Production companies: Phillips Mark Productions; Robert Guenette Productions

Original release
- Network: CBS
- Release: November 5, 1985

Dinosaur! is a 1985 American television documentary film about dinosaurs. It was first broadcast in the United States on November 5, 1985, on CBS. Directed by Robert Guenette and written by Steven Paul Mark, Dinosaur! was hosted by American actor Christopher Reeve, who some years before had played the leading role in Superman.

In 1991, another documentary, also titled Dinosaur! though not related, was hosted on A&E by the CBS anchorman Walter Cronkite.

== Content ==
Jointly with Reeve's narration, the documentary shows special effects scenes which reconstruct dinosaurs and their era, along with interviews with the most famous paleontologists at the time of the documentary shooting, including Jack Horner, Robert Bakker, Phil Currie, and Dale Russell.

After a short introductory sequence and the subsequent opening credits the film starts with the mating of Hadrosaurus, a species which in the documentary is identified as "hadrosaur", "the duck-billed dinosaur" or "duck-bill". The female soon lays a clutch of eggs that are eaten by a Struthiomimus, except for one. When the Struthiomimus eats the last egg it stole, it is then hunted and killed by a pair of Deinonychus. The remaining hadrosaur egg hatches and grows into a juvenile. While it is out grazing with its parents, it wanders off and it almost gets killed by a Tyrannosaurus rex, but the parents hear its cries and come to the rescue. While one of the parents looks after the juvenile, the other one faces the theropod and knocks it over with its strong, 2,000-pound tail. Once down, the Tyrannosaurus could not get up easily, so the herbivore is given a chance to escape. Once all three hadrosaurs are happily back together and the Tyrannosaurus is back on its feet, the latter defeatedly walks back into the forest.

Next, a herd of Brontosaurus is shown, busy eating leaves from tall trees. They use their long necks to reach high branches.

Next, a herd of Monoclonius is seen grazing. One member wanders off into the forest in search of flowers. Night falls and it tries to find the herd. It soon stumbles upon the remains of a killed hadrosaur and becomes wary. The Tyrannosaurus then ambushes it and bites hard on its back. The Monoclonius breaks free and stabs the Tyrannosaurus in the shin, which only infuriates the predator. The Monoclonius becomes cornered and is killed.

That night, all seems calm. Suddenly, an asteroid crashes into Earth and kills the dinosaurs. After that, a small mouse-like mammal (live-acted by an opossum) is seen climbing out of a hole in the ground, among the bones of a dead hadrosaur, signaling the start of mammals ruling the Earth.

The documentary also discusses the overgrowing popularity of dinosaurs, as well as the possibility of living cryptids such as the Loch Ness Monster and Mokele-mbembe.

== Origins of the project ==
Immediately before working in the full length television documentary Dinosaur!, Phil Tippett had been working in an experimental sequence lasting ten minutes. Conceived and created by Tippett with the help of Industrial Light & Magic stop-motion animators Randy Dutra (who made the dinosaur molds and skins) and Tom St. Amand (who made the inner articulated metallic skeletons of the dinosaurs), this original sequence was titled Prehistoric Beast and tried to improve go motion animation special effects techniques. The story of the short was simple: the chase and predation of a Monoclonius by a Tyrannosaurus. This short animated film was only released in specialized animation festivals in 1984, but it convinced Robert Guenette and Steven Paul Mark to request Tippett's skills in order to transform it into a full-length documentary. They then asked Tippett to realise new sequences with other dinosaur species, like Hadrosaurus, Deinonychus, Struthiomimus and Brontosaurus, while stock footage from the 1979 film Meteor was used to depict an asteroid, the one supposed to have crashed into the Earth, causing the dinosaur's extinction. Adding all this new material to the material from Prehistoric Beast resulted in the 1985 Dinosaur! documentary.

The go motion animation technique was first used by Tippett in the Star Wars original trilogy of films (1977, 1980, 1983), especially in the second installment, The Empire Strikes Back (1980), animating the tauntauns and the AT-ATs seen in the film. In 1983, when his work with the original Star Wars trilogy was finished, Tippett went on to improve his animation technique by means of Prehistoric Beast (1984). He further improved the technique when his Tippet Studio was appointed for the special effects of Dinosaur! (first aired in 1985). Tippet's experimental work on those two films about dinosaurs helped with the animatics and CGI animated dinosaur sequences he made later for Jurassic Park (1993).

== Production ==
Dinosaur! was primarily shot in New York City and Los Angeles, and in some fossiliferous locations of the United States. Reeve was a "Dino fan" and demonstrated his enthusiasm by flying his own airplane to the American Museum of Natural History in New York and requesting himself reshoots of several scenes.

Special effects were mainly made in Phil Tippett's garage. Tippett received assistance from Industrial Light & Magic stop-motion animators Randy Dutra (who made the dinosaur molds and skins) and Tom St. Amand (who made the inner articulated metallic skeletons of the dinosaurs).

Some excerpts from old films are utilized in Dinosaur! in order to explain how popular dinosaurs were in cinema. One of those excerpts was a scene from King Kong (1933), in which a character pronounces the words "prehistoric beast", which is the title chosen by Tippett for his experimental short.

== Release ==
Following its initial airing, Dinosaur! was shown on the Disney Channel throughout the 1990s before it went from being a premium pay channel on cable to a standard channel. It had a VHS release on May 5, 1993, by Family Home Entertainment.

== Legacy ==
Some footage of Dinosaur! was re-dubbed with different sound effects and music in the original 3D Dinosaur Adventure for MS-DOS operating systems by Knowledge Adventure. It was used in again the 1995 and 1996 Windows remake of the game. They appeared in the 1993 PC-video game called Microsoft Dinosaurs. They appeared in the 1998 ABC World Reference game called Wide World of Dinosaurs for Microsoft Windows and Apple Macintosh operating systems by Creative Wonders. Some of the Footage from Dinosaur! was also used in the episode of Growing Up Wild/Madison's Adventures called Leapin Lizards. Footage of Dinosaur! was also used in Really Wild Animals for the episode "Dinosaurs and Other Creature Features".

== Awards ==
- Primetime Emmy Award for Outstanding Special Visual Effects (1986)
