= Human uses of reptiles =

Overview of humans' uses of reptiles

Human uses of reptiles have for centuries included both symbolic and practical interactions.

Symbolic uses of reptiles include accounts in mythology, religion, and folklore as well as pictorial symbols such as medicine's serpent-entwined caduceus. Myths of creatures with snake-like or reptilian attributes are found around the world, from Chinese and European dragons to the Woolunga of Australia. Classical myths told of the nine-headed Lernaean Hydra, the Gorgon sisters including the snake-haired Medusa, and the snake-legged Titans. Crocodiles appear in the religions of Ancient Egypt, in Hinduism, and in Aztec and other Latin American cultures.

Practical uses of reptiles include the manufacture of snake antivenom and the farming of crocodiles, principally for leather but also for meat. Reptiles still pose a threat to human populations, as snakes kill some tens of thousands each year, while crocodiles attack and kill hundreds of people per year in Southeast Asia and Africa. However, people keep some reptiles such as iguanas, turtles, and the docile corn snake as pets.

Soon after their discovery in the nineteenth century, dinosaurs were represented to the public as the large-scale sculptures of the Crystal Palace Dinosaurs, while in the twentieth century they became important elements in the popular imagination, thought of as maladapted and obsolete failures, but also as fantastic and terrifying creatures in monster movies. In folklore, crocodiles were thought to weep to lure their prey, or in sorrow for their prey, a tale told in the classical era, and repeated by Sir John Mandeville and William Shakespeare. Negative attitudes to reptiles, especially snakes, have led to widespread persecution, contributing to the challenge of conserving reptiles in the face of the effects of human activity such as habitat loss and pollution.

== Context ==
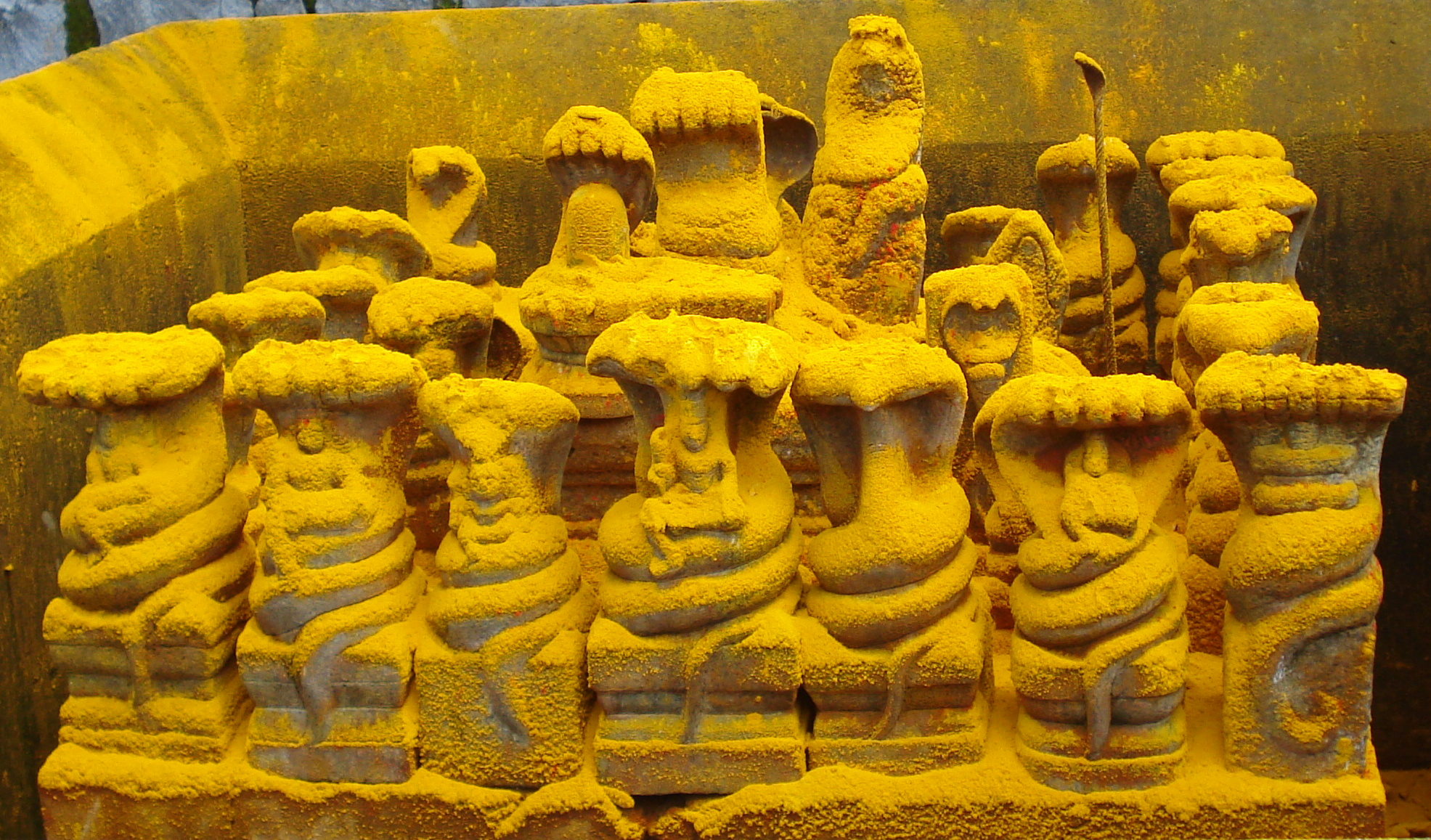
Nagarajav (cobra god) shrine at Sabarimala

Culture consists of the social behaviour and norms found in human societies and transmitted through social learning. Cultural universals in all human societies include expressive forms like art, music, dance, ritual, religion, and technologies like tool usage, cooking, shelter, and clothing. The concept of material culture covers physical expressions such as technology, architecture and art, whereas immaterial culture includes principles of social organization, mythology, philosophy, literature, and science.

The ethnobiologist Luis Ceriaco reviews the place of reptiles in culture, as studied by ethnoherpetology, considering their practical uses, namely food, medicine, and other materials; their contribution to "ecological equilibrium", the balance of nature; and negative or fearful attitudes to them (especially snakes), causing persecution, an additional challenge for conservation. This persecution, Ceriaco states, is related to and perhaps caused by myths and folklore about the animals.

More broadly, ethnozoology studies the place of animals in human life, spanning topics including using animals for food, whether by hunting or by domestication and farming; animals as pets, in entertainment, and in sport; reports of mythical animals; human attitudes towards animals; medicinal and magic religious uses; and the exploitation of traditional knowledge of animals, such as in conservation.

A more recent perspective is to view the interactions of humans and reptiles as something of "more-than-human agency", in other words the subject of a multi-species study. For example, the behaviour of crocodiles "is constructed in interaction, both between people and crocodiles, and among people"; markedly different results depended on "institutional arrangements and attitudes towards sharing a dam with crocodiles" in different villages in Benin, where knowledge of crocodile habits reduced attacks.

== Symbolic interactions ==
=== In mythology and religion ===
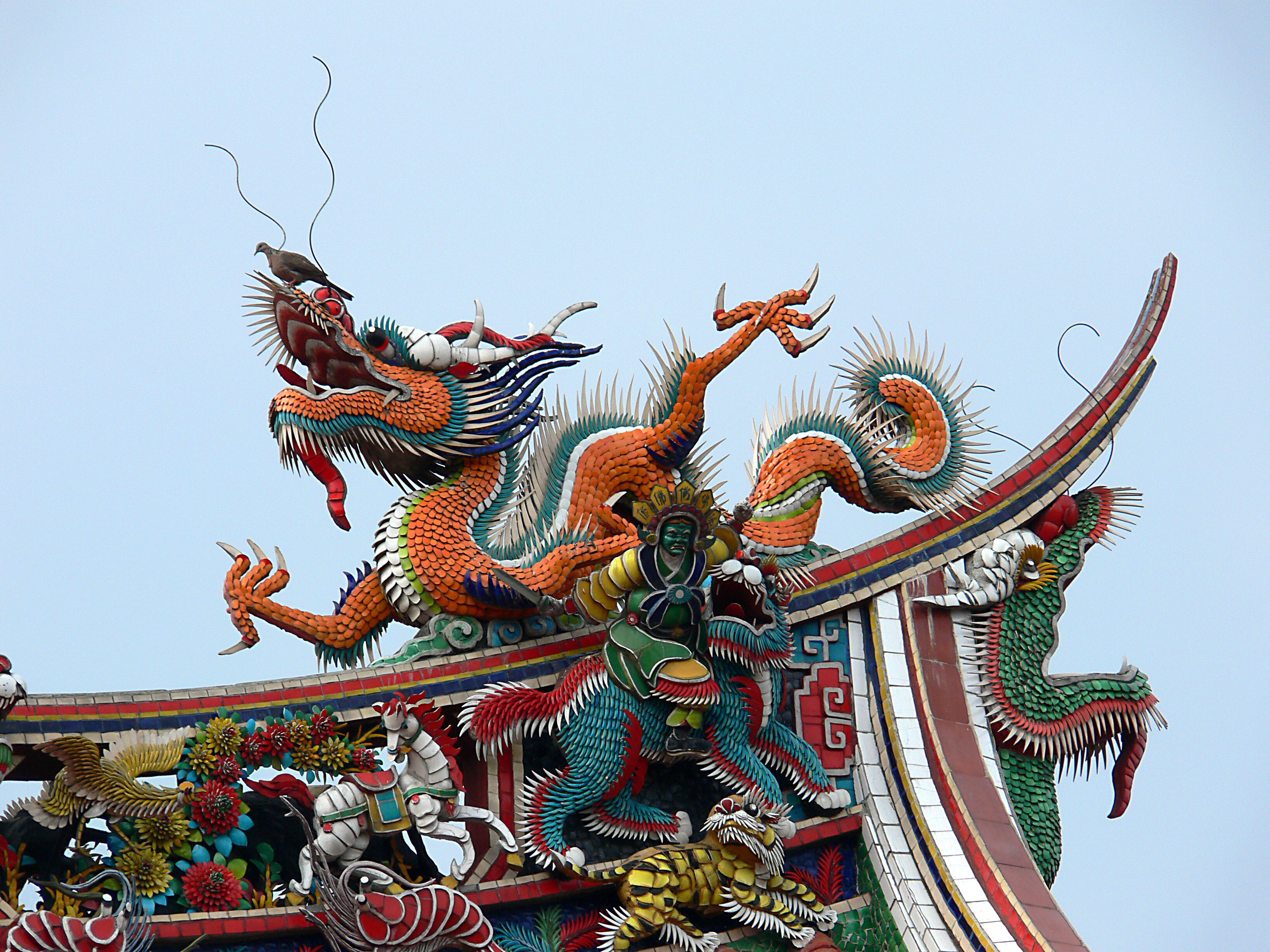
Dragon sculpture atop Longshan Temple, Taiwan

Reptiles both real, like crocodiles and snakes, and imaginary, like dragons, appear in mythology and religions around the world. A widespread theme is the World Turtle that supports the world; it is found in the mythologies of Hinduism, China and the Americas. Romulo Alves and colleagues recorded the use of 13 species of reptiles (crocodilians and snakes) in Brazil for magic religious purposes such as magic spells, attracting sexual partners, and as amulets to protect against the evil eye.

A dragon is a reptile-like legendary creature in the myths of European and Chinese cultures, with counterparts in Japan, Korea and other East Asian countries. The (genuine) plesiosaur Woolungasaurus is named after the Woolunga, a mythical reptile of Australia. In Greek mythology snakes are associated with deadly antagonists, as a chthonic symbol, roughly translated as 'earthbound'. The nine-headed Lernaean Hydra that Hercules defeated and the three Gorgon sisters are children of Gaia, the earth. Medusa was one of the three Gorgon sisters who Perseus defeated. Medusa is described as a hideous mortal, with snakes instead of hair and the power to turn men to stone with her gaze. After killing her, Perseus gave her head to Athena who fixed it to her shield called the Aegis. The Titans are also depicted in art with snakes instead of legs and feet for the same reason—they are children of Gaia and Uranus, so they are bound to the earth.

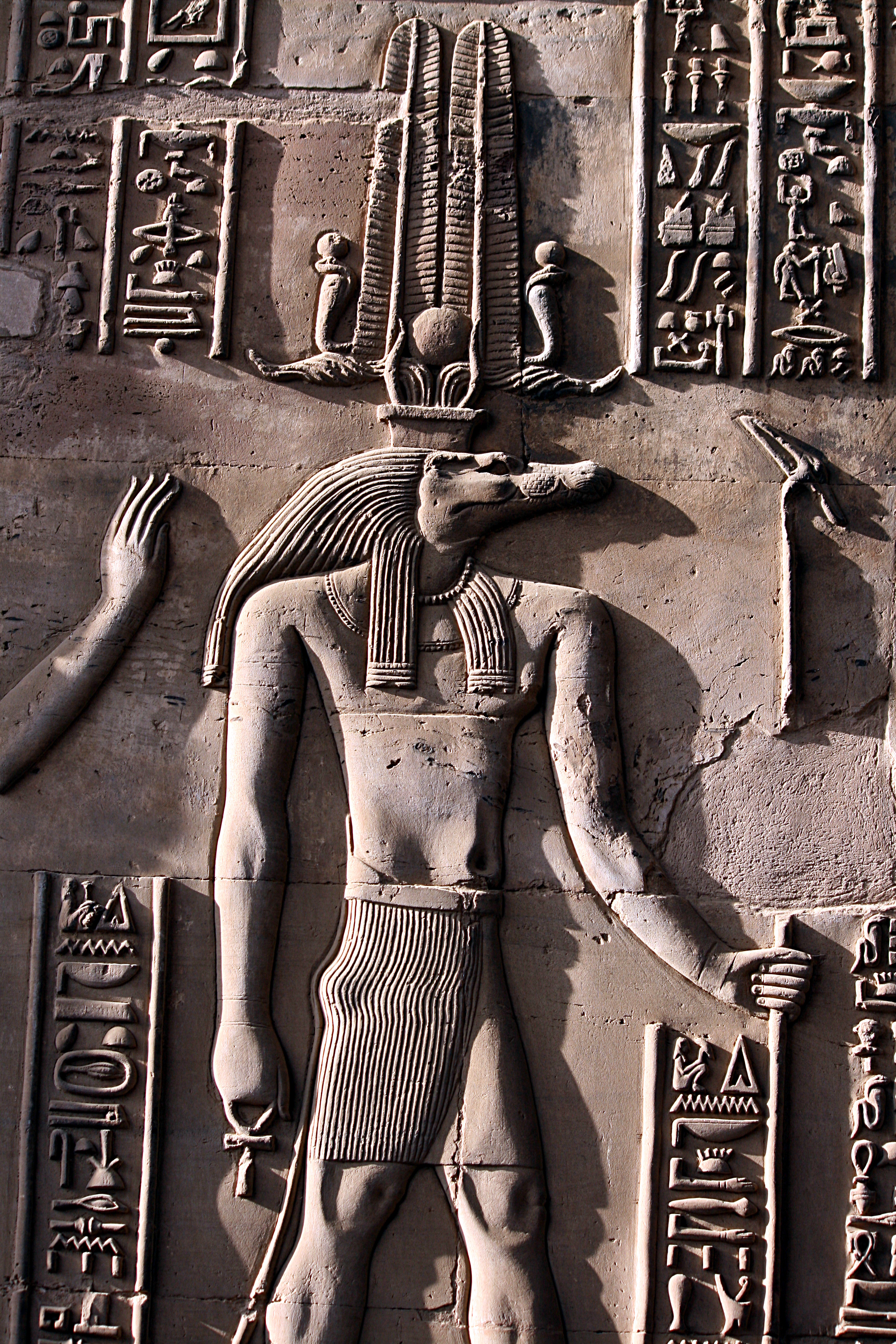
The Ancient Egyptian crocodile-headed god, Sobek

Crocodiles have appeared in religions across the world. Ancient Egypt had Sobek, the crocodile-headed god, with his cult-city Crocodilopolis, as well as Taweret, the goddess of childbirth and fertility, with the back and tail of a crocodile. In Hinduism, Varuna, a Vedic and Hindu god, rides a makara, a water-beast like a crocodile, and he is called Nāgarāja, lord of snakes. Similarly the goddess personifications of the Ganga and Yamuna rivers are often depicted as riding crocodiles. In Goa, crocodile worship is practised, as at the annual Mannge Thapnee ceremony. In Latin America, Cipactli was the giant earth crocodile of the Aztec and other Nahua peoples.

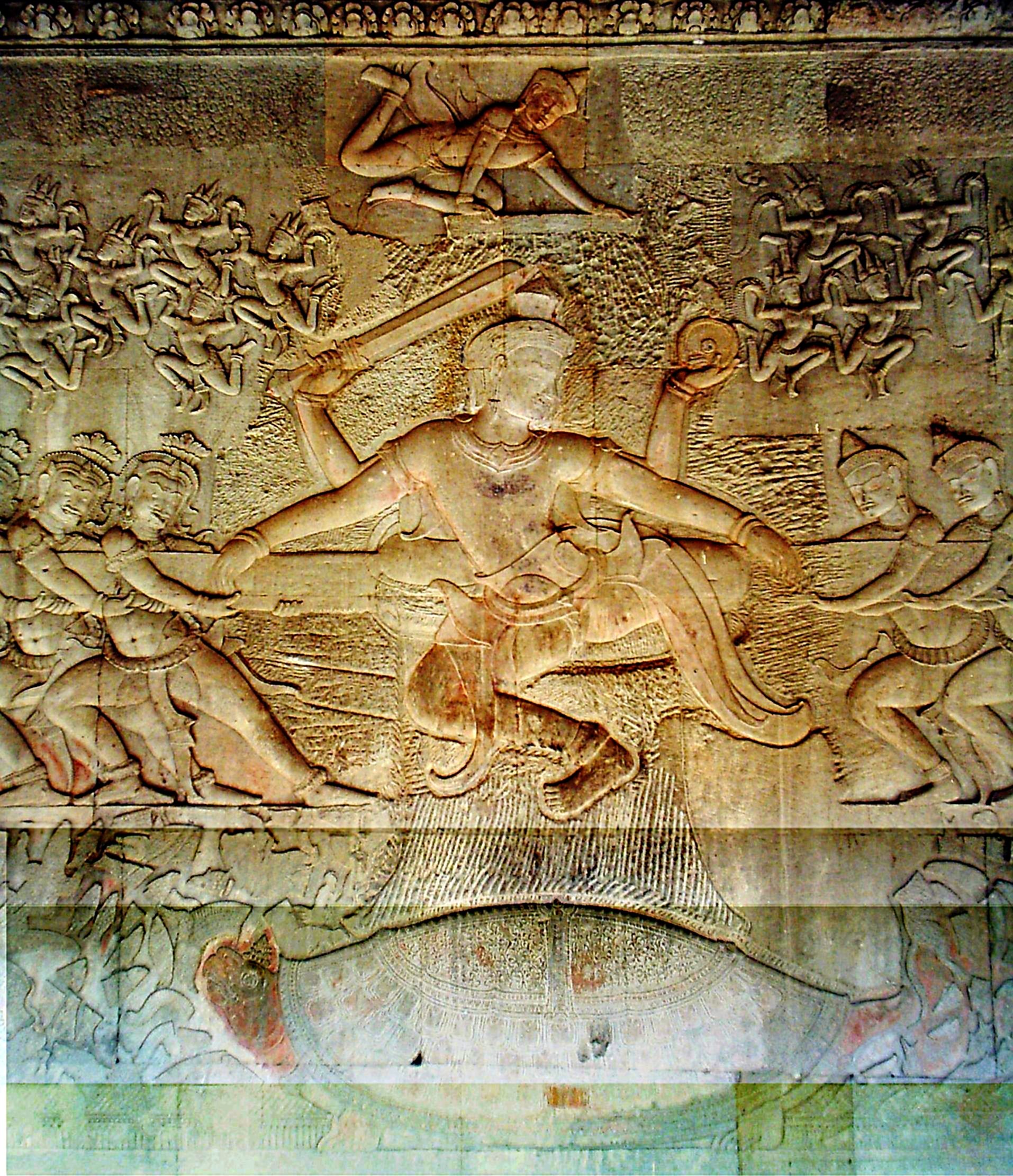
Bas-relief from Angkor Wat with Samudra Manthana-Vishnu in the centre above his turtle avatar, Kurma

In Hinduism, snakes are worshipped as gods. The cobra is seen around the neck of Shiva, while Vishnu is often depicted as sleeping on a seven-headed snake or within the coils of a serpent. There are temples in India solely for cobras, which are sometimes called nagaraja (King of Snakes), and it is believed that snakes are symbols of fertility. In the annual Hindu festival of Naga Panchami, snakes are venerated and prayed to, and given gifts of milk, sweets, flowers, and lamps.

In religious terms, the snake rivals the jaguar in importance in ancient Mesoamerica. "In states of ecstasy, lords dance a serpent dance; great descending snakes adorn and support buildings from Chichen Itza to Tenochtitlan, and the Nahuatl word coatl meaning serpent or twin, forms part of primary deities such as Mixcoatl, Quetzalcoatl, and Coatlicue.".

The Amaru, a mythological being with serpent-like characteristics, is a common motif in Andean and South American mythology.

In Christianity and Judaism, a serpent appears in Genesis 3:1 to tempt Adam and Eve with the forbidden fruit from the Tree of Knowledge. In Neo-Paganism and Wicca, the snake is seen as a symbol of wisdom and knowledge. A legend tells that Saint Patrick banished snakes from Ireland; there are no extant native snakes there. The legend of Saint George and the Dragon, which has pre-Christian origins, tells that the saint, often depicted on horseback and armed with a lance, killed a dragon.

More recently, the urban legend of New York sewer alligators holds that pet reptiles, released when they grew too large for their owners' comfort, thrived and grew to monstrous size beneath the city's streets.

The serpent-entwined Rod of Asclepius, a symbol of medicine

=== As symbols ===
The snake or serpent has played a powerful symbolic role in different cultures. In Egyptian history, the Nile cobra adorned the crown of the pharaoh. It was worshipped as one of the gods and was also used for sinister purposes: murder of an adversary and ritual suicide (Cleopatra). In America, the snake has served as a symbol of deceptiveness, as when US President Andrew Jackson told the Creek Nation in 1829 that he spoke with a straight tongue, not a forked one.

Three medical symbols involving snakes, still used today, are the Bowl of Hygieia symbolizing pharmacy, and the Caduceus and Rod of Asclepius, symbols of medicine.

The ouroboros is a widely used symbol, claimed to be related to alchemy. It is depicted as a coiled snake eating its own tail, representing the cycle of life, death and rebirth. The snake is one of the 12 celestial animals of the Chinese Zodiac. Ancient Peruvian cultures often depicted snakes.

The tortoise was a fertility symbol in ancient Greece and Rome, and an attribute of Aphrodite/Venus. The turtle has a prominent position as a symbol of steadfastness and tranquility in religion, mythology, and folklore from around the world. A tortoise's longevity is suggested by its long lifespan and its shell, which was thought to protect it from any foe. In the cosmological myths of several cultures a World Turtle carries the world upon its back or supports the heavens.

=== In literature ===
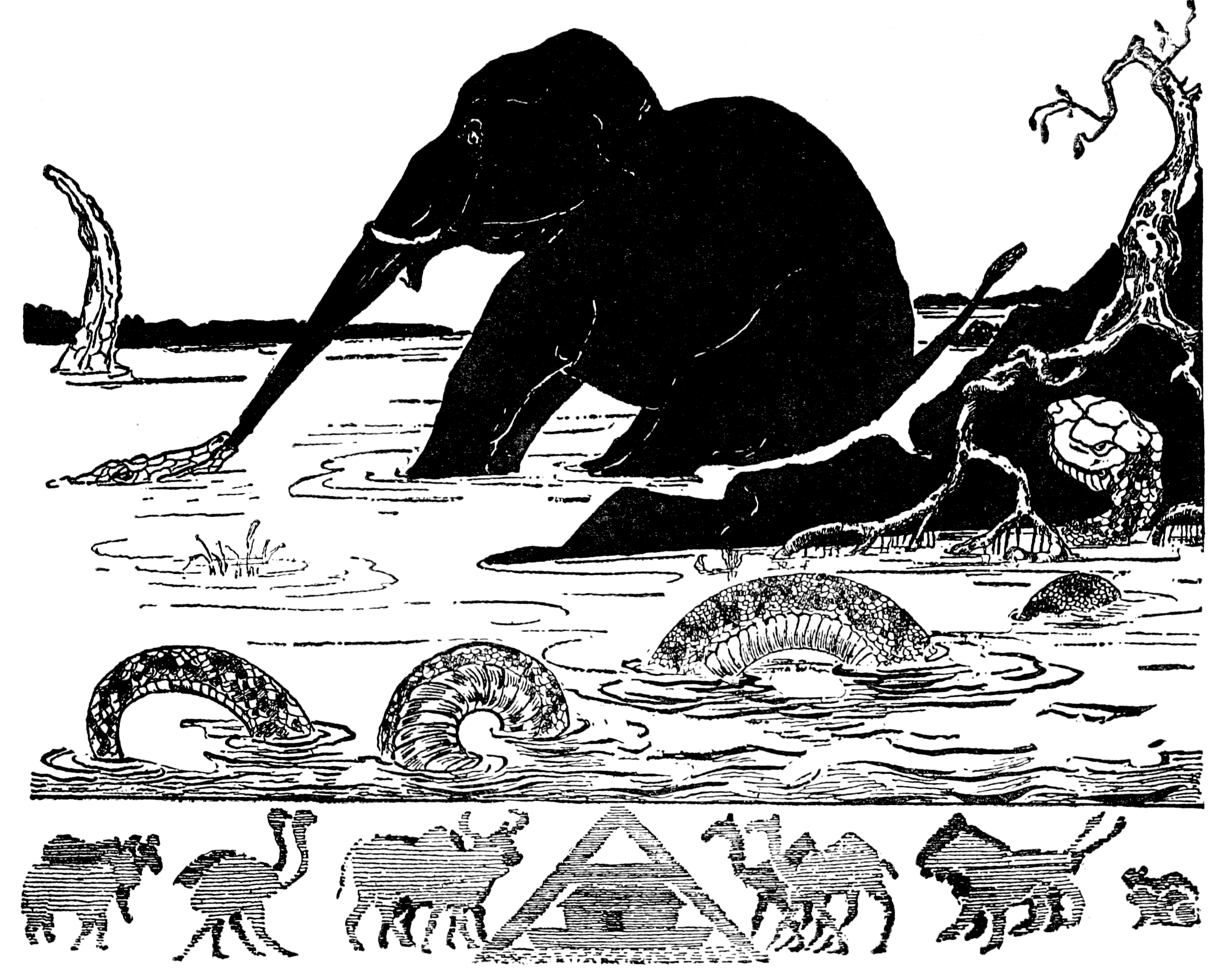
"How the elephant got his trunk" in Rudyard Kipling's 1902 Just So Stories

Reptiles have appeared in literature since ancient times. Pliny the Elder, for instance, describes the legendary basilisk as a snake "twelve fingers in length". The animal reappears many times in Western literature, including in Isidore of Seville's medieval Etymologiae, and more recently in J. K. Rowling's 1998 Harry Potter and the Chamber of Secrets. Among the many other reptiles in children's literature, Rudyard Kipling's story "How the Elephant got his Trunk" in his 1902 book Just So Stories features a crocodile who grips and stretches the elephant's nose.

Turtles and tortoises feature in books for children and adults, from The Tortoise and the Hare in Aesop's Fables to Alderman Ptolemy Tortoise in Beatrix Potter's The Tale of Mr. Jeremy Fisher and Br'er Turtle in Uncle Remus's folktales. In Stephen King's The Dark Tower series, the world was created by the turtle Maturin, one of the guardians of the tower.

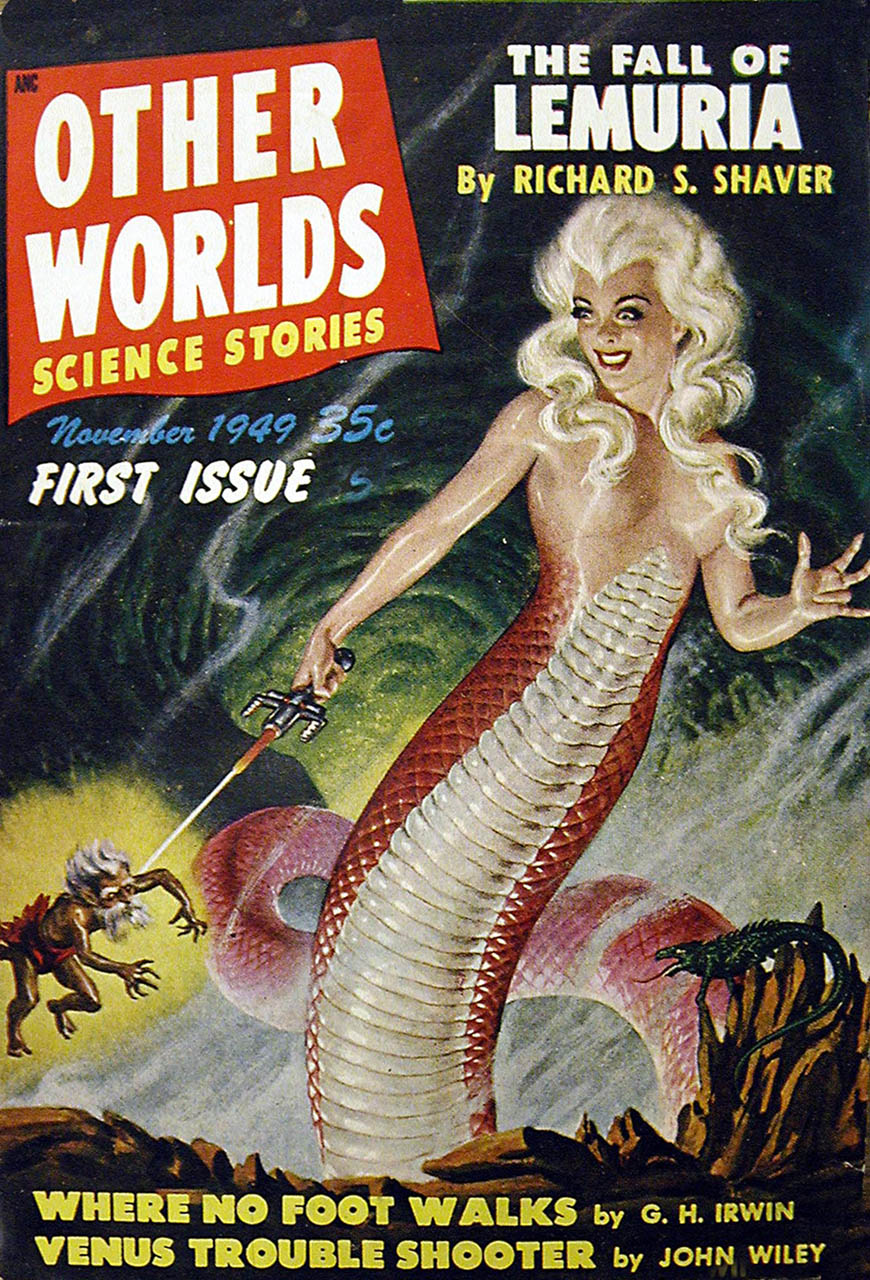
Snake woman on cover of Other Worlds, November 1949

Snakes, too, have played a role in literature since ancient Rome, where Cadmus kills a gigantic serpent in Ovid's Metamorphoses, and as prophesied is transformed into a snake. The eponymous heroine in William Shakespeare's Antony and Cleopatra kills herself with an asp viper, while John Milton's Paradise Lost describes Satan as a mighty serpent, "Fold above fold a surging Maze his Head / Crested aloft, and Carbuncle his Eyes; / With burnisht Neck of verdant Gold, erect / Amidst his circling Spires." In D. H. Lawrence's Snake, the thirsty poet is forced to wait while the snake "sipped with his straight mouth, / Softly drank through his straight gums, into his slack long body, / Silently." Among the novels that feature snakes, Lemony Snicket's 1999 The Reptile Room tells of a herpetologist who cares for orphaned children and dies of snakebite, while Barbara Kingsolver's 1998 thriller The Poisonwood Bible portrays a missionary in the Congo, who is greeted by the planting of deadly snakes in his friend's houses, and then his own.

The supposed weeping of insincere crocodile tears is derived from an ancient anecdote that crocodiles weep to lure their prey, or that they cry for the victims they are eating, first told in the ninth century Bibliotheca by Photios. The story is repeated in bestiaries such as De bestiis et aliis rebus. This tale was first spread widely in English in the stories of the travels of Sir John Mandeville in the 14th century, and appears in several of Shakespeare's plays. In fact, crocodiles can generate tears, but they do not cry.

=== In art ===
Reptiles including crocodiles, lizards, snakes, and tortoises have been portrayed by artists since ancient times, using media as varied as fresco, ceramic, marble, jewellery, and oil on canvas. This has sometimes been for their symbolism, as with snakes. M. C. Escher explored tessellations in his graphic art using lizards and snakes among other animals.

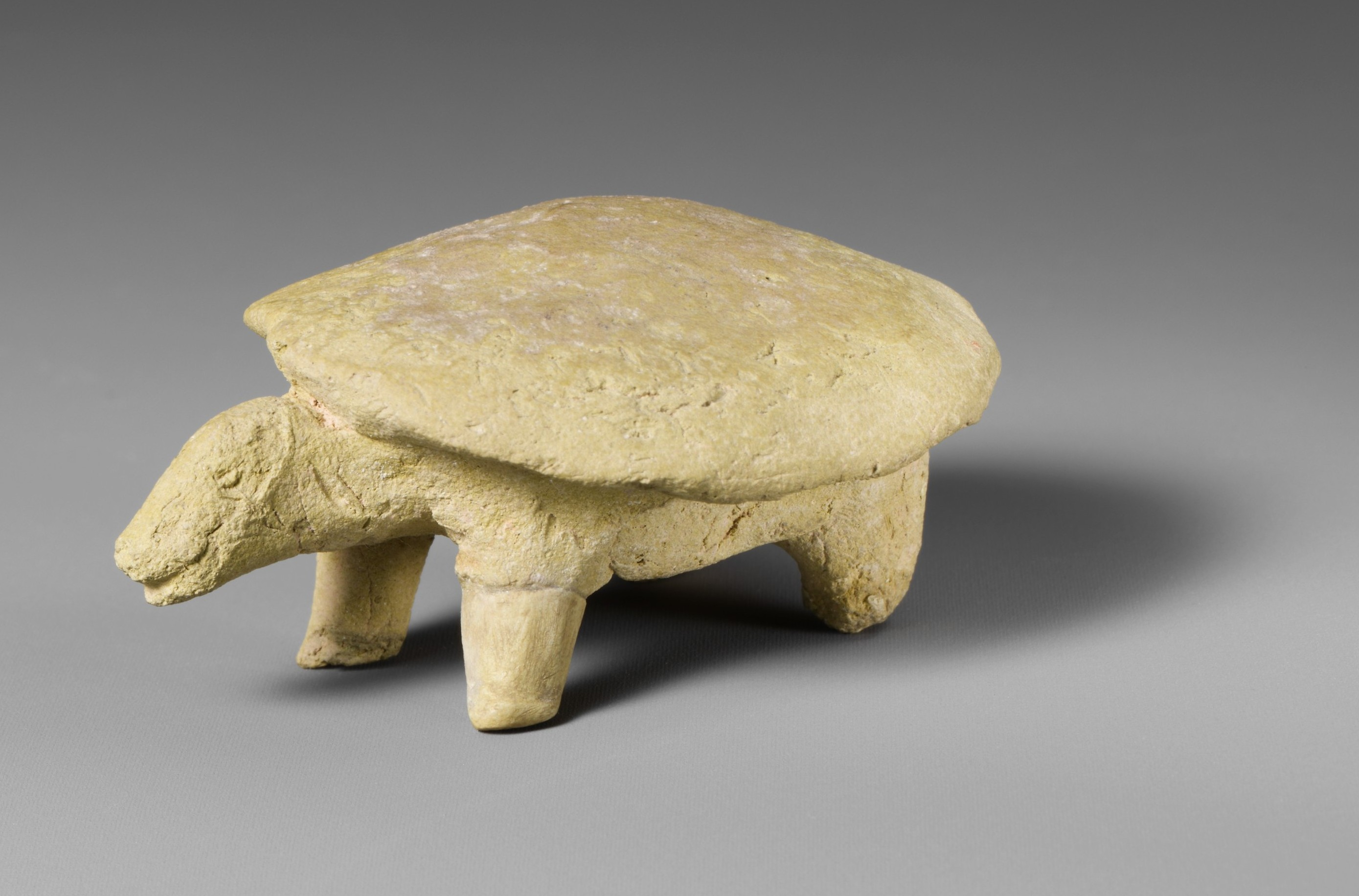
Tortoise figurine, ceramic, Near East, 3rd millennium BC

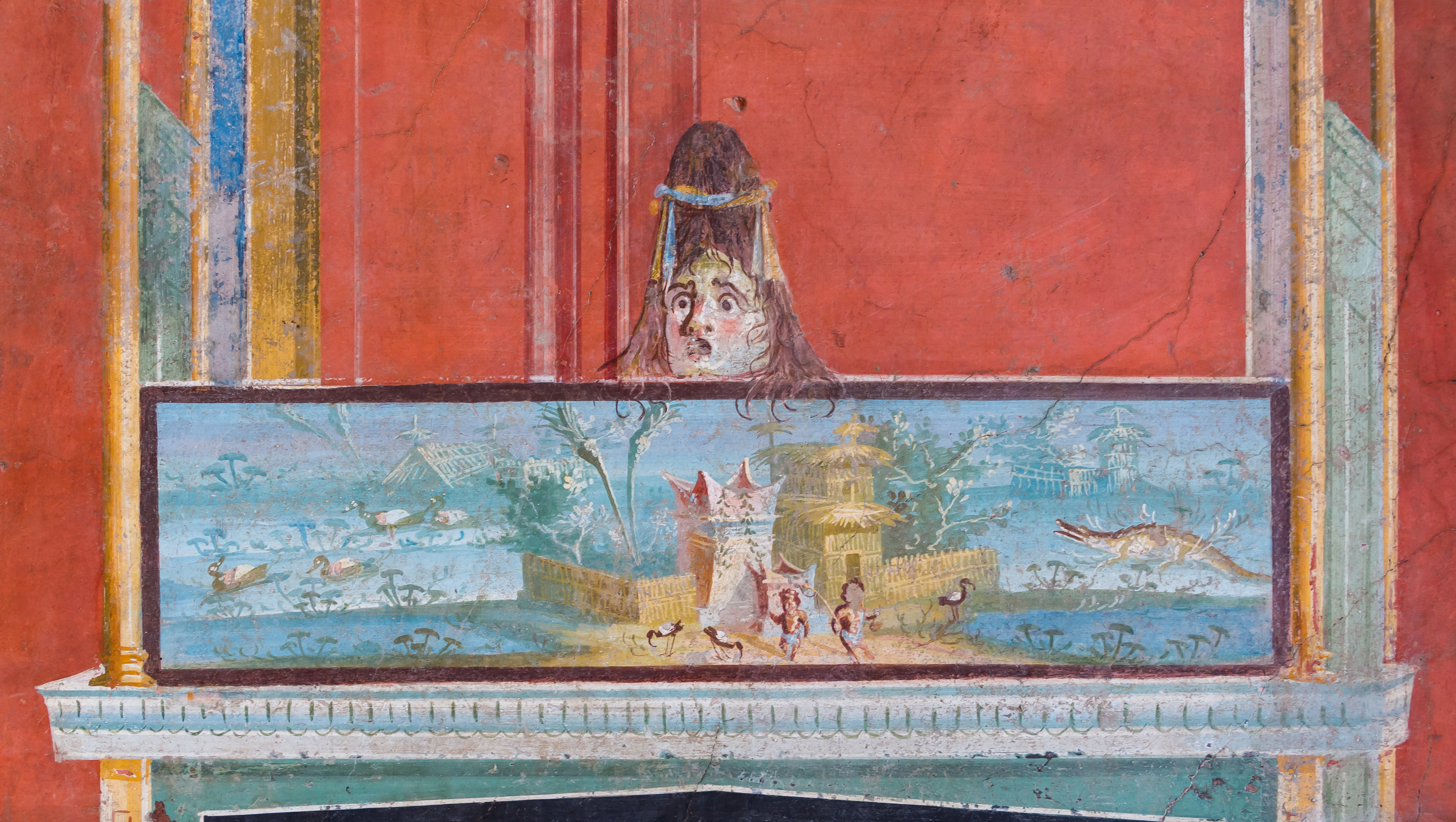
River scene with crocodile. Fresco from Pompeii, 62–79 AD

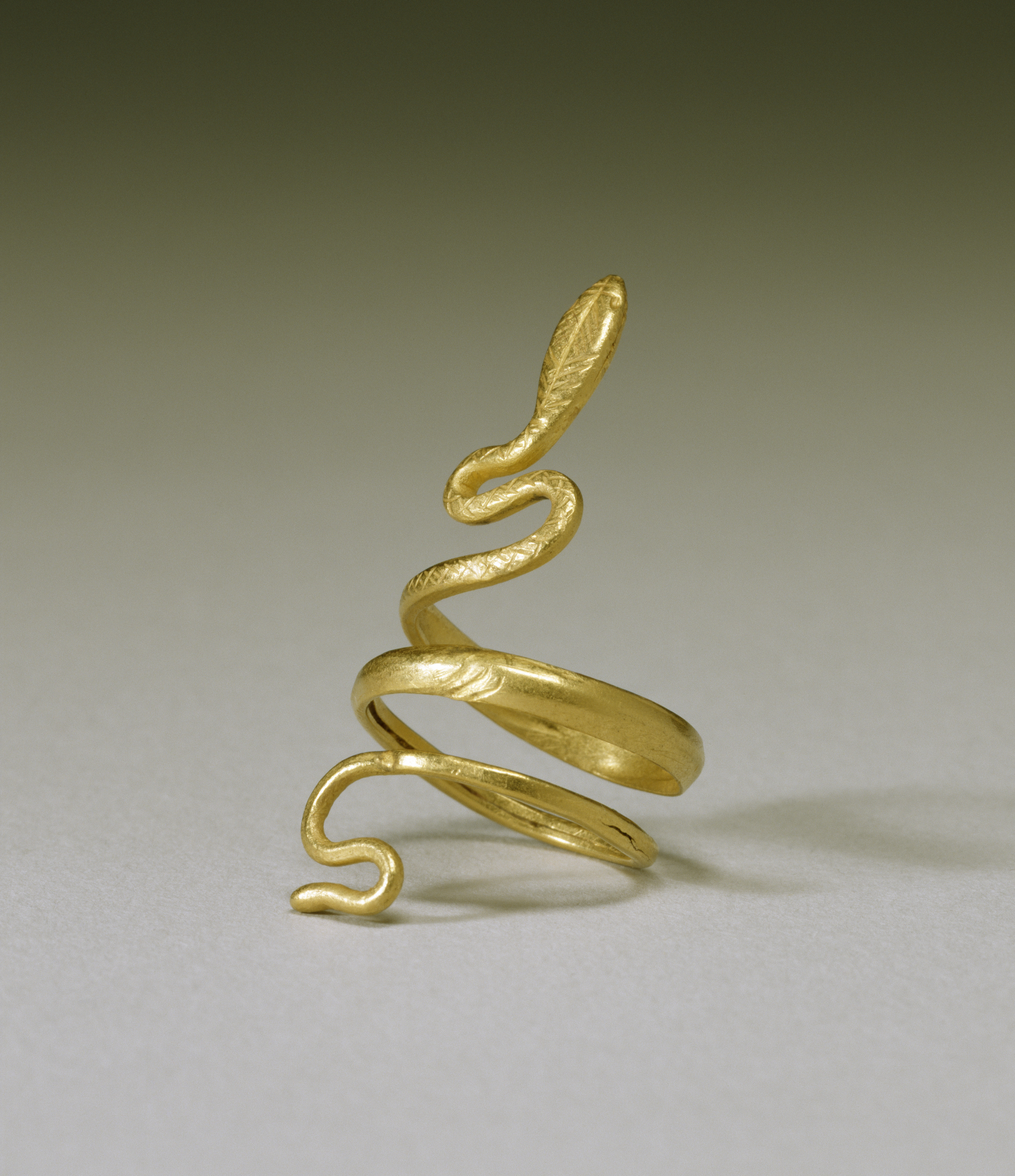
Roman snake ring, 1st century AD

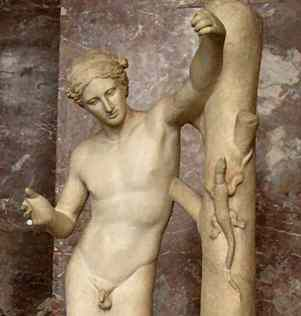
Apollo the lizard-killer (detail), Roman copy of Praxiteles, 4th century BC

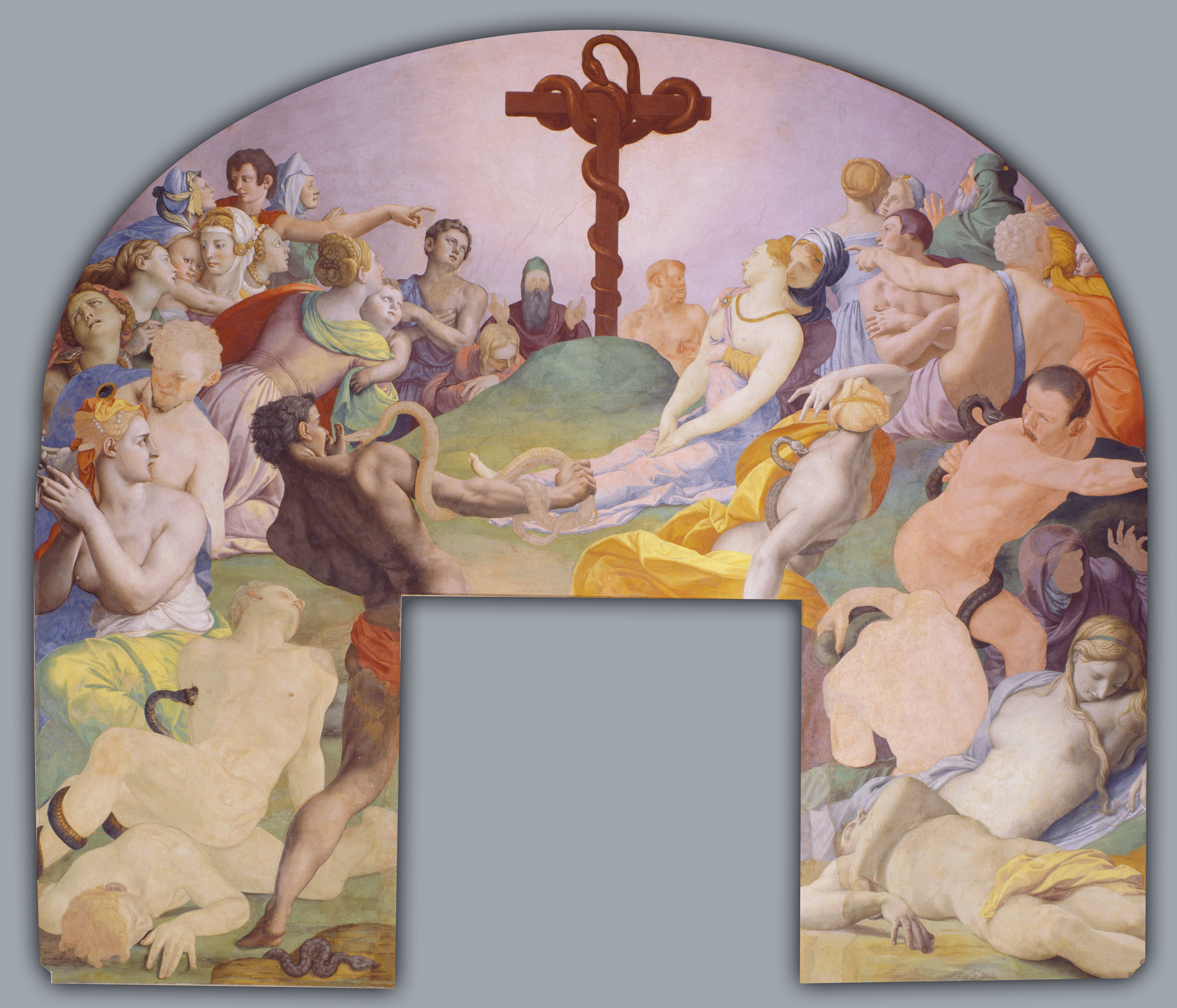
The adoration of the bronze snake by Agnolo Bronzino, c. 1545

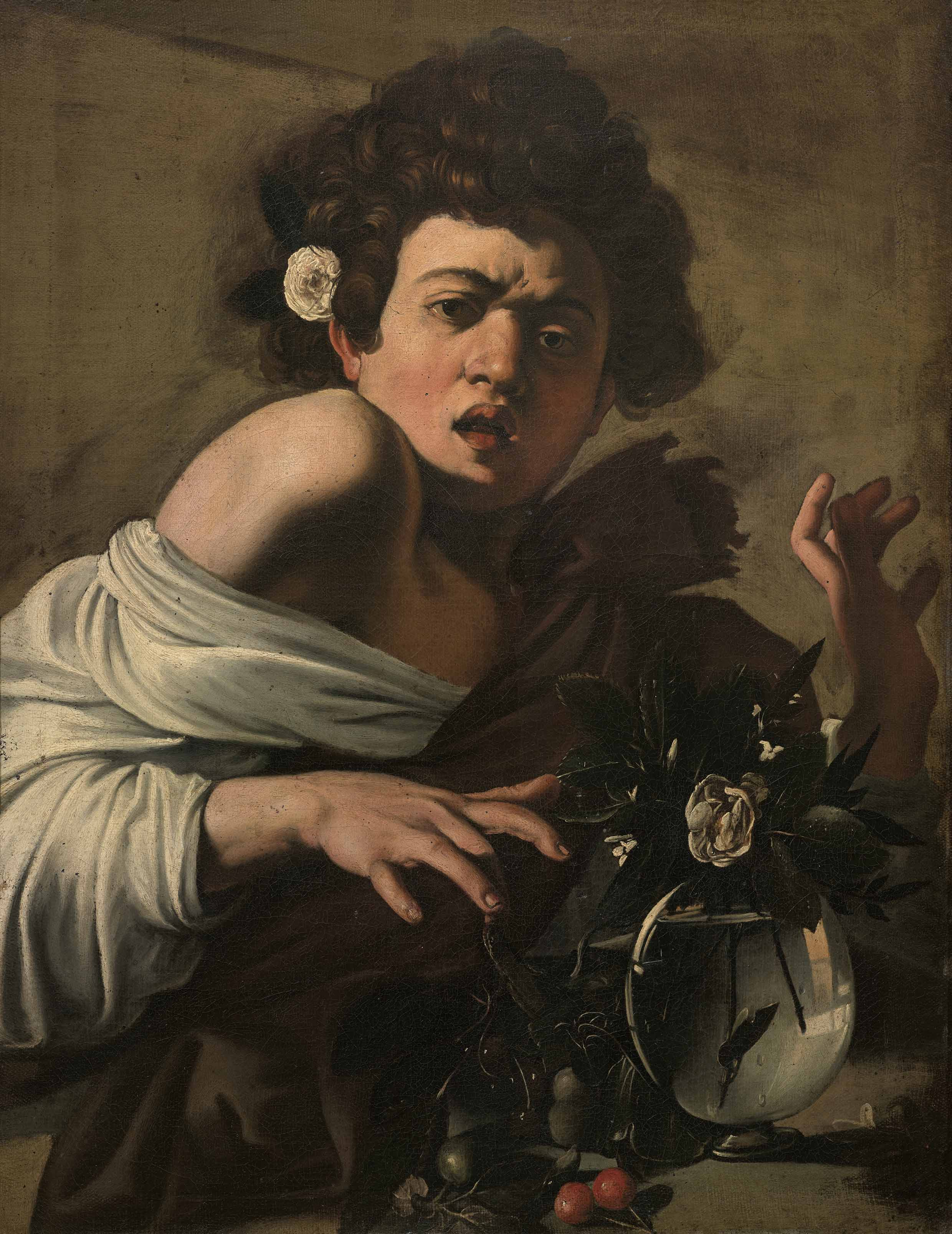
Boy Bitten by a Lizard by Caravaggio, c. 1595

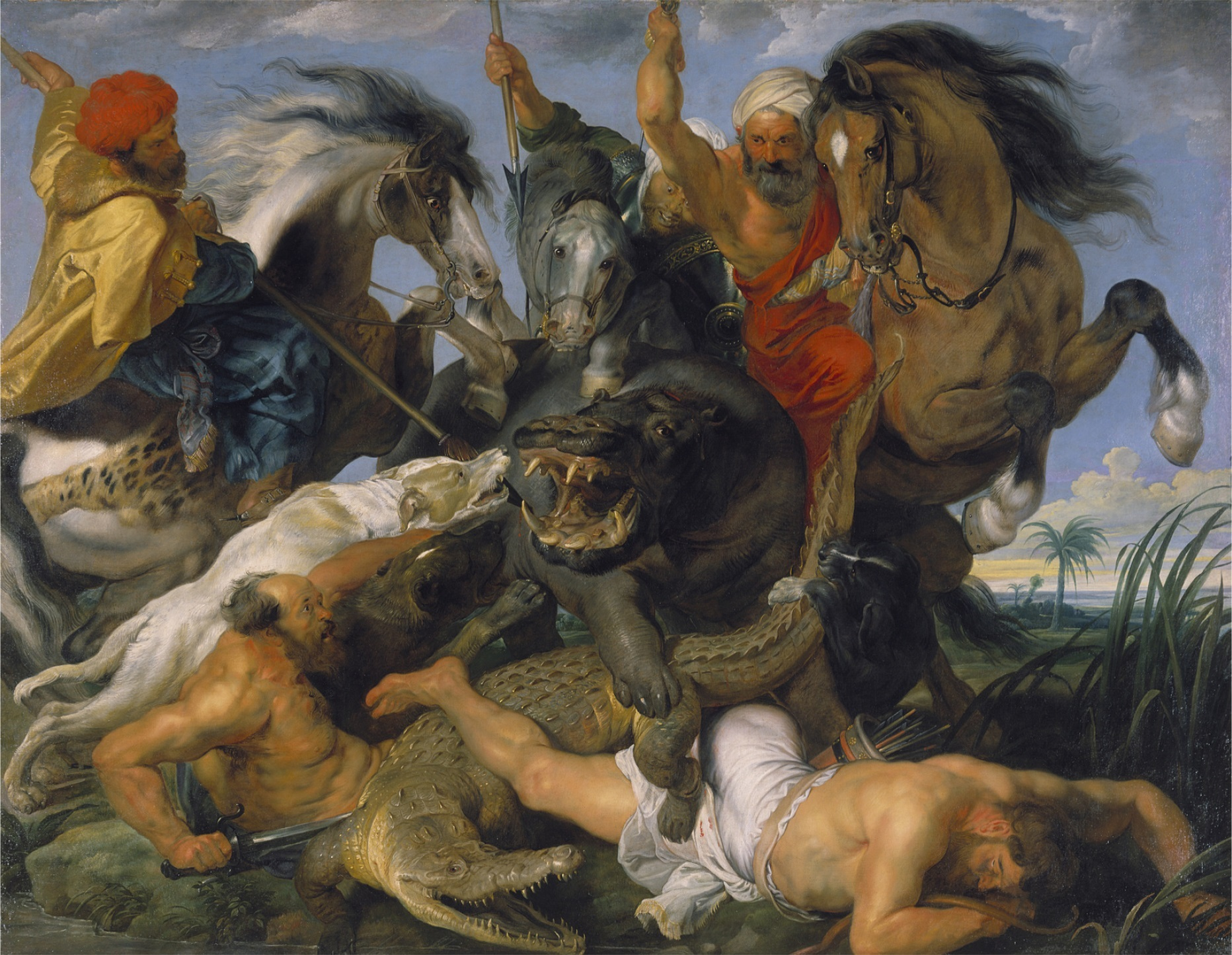
Hippopotamus and Crocodile Hunt by Peter Paul Rubens, c. 1616

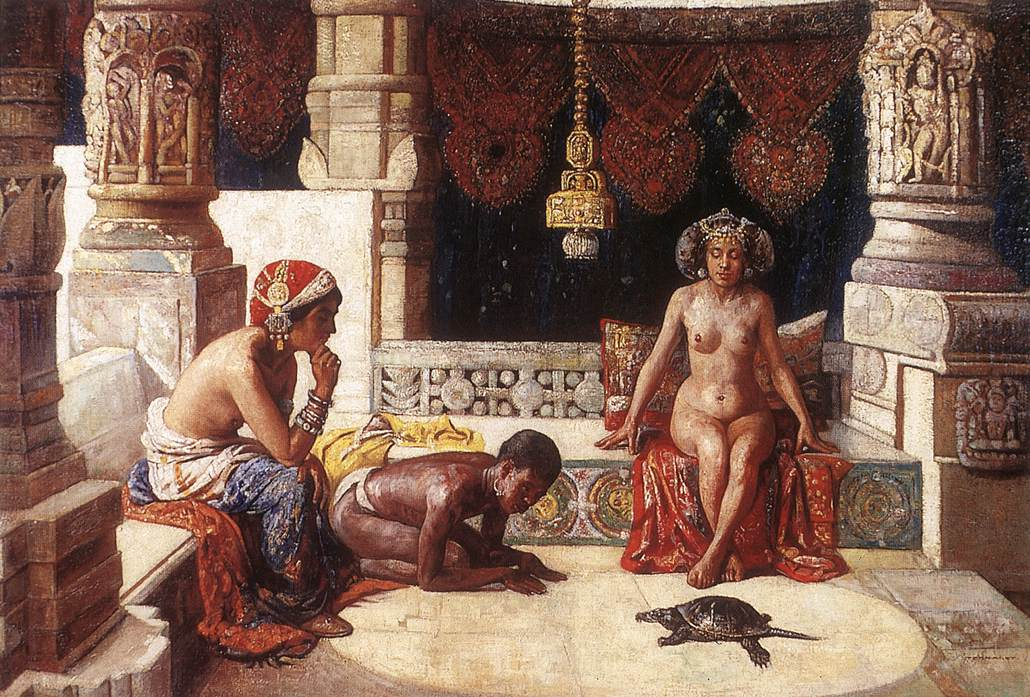
Nudes with Tortoise by Gyula Tornai (1861–1928)

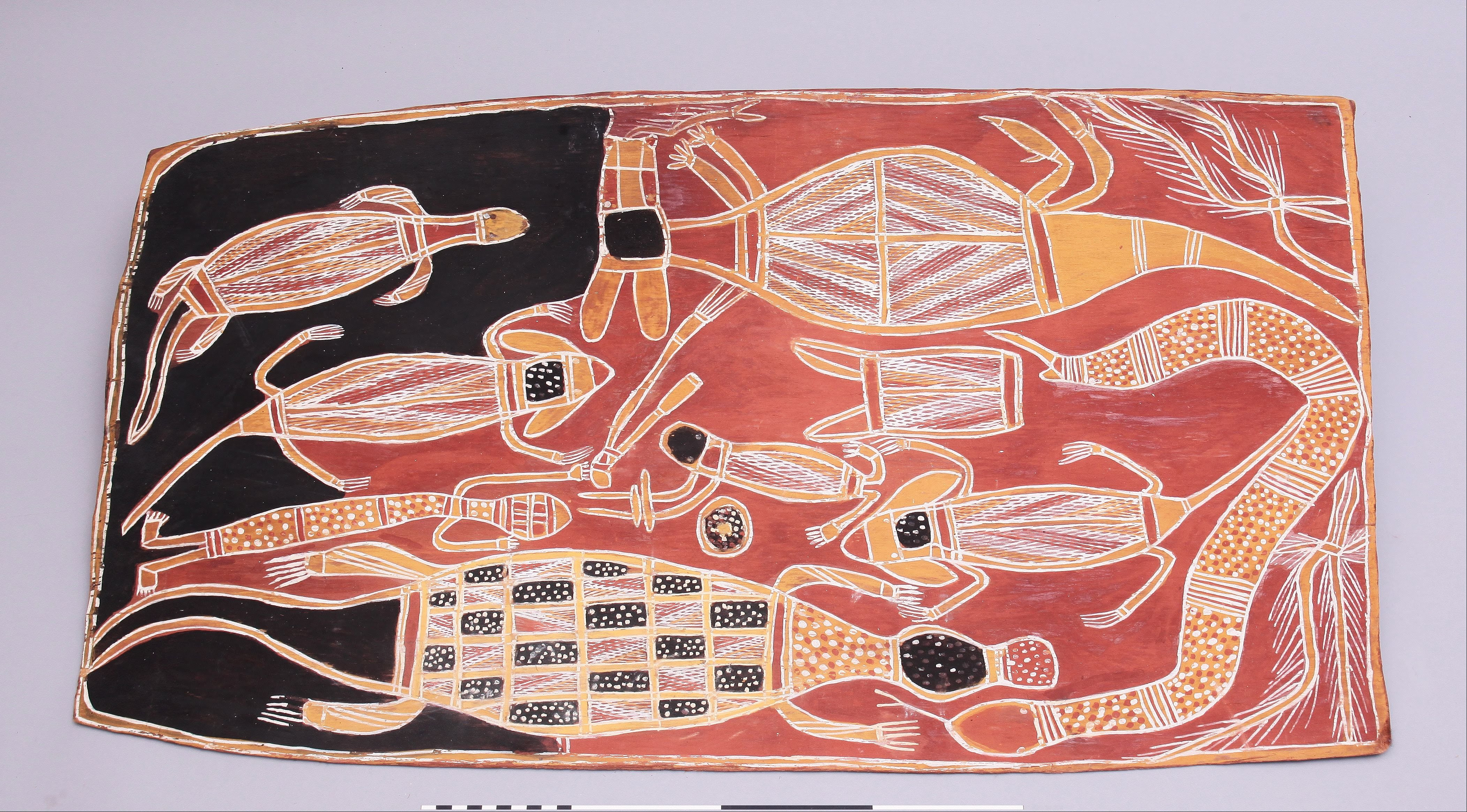
Aboriginal Australian painting with lizards and snake, 1900–1970

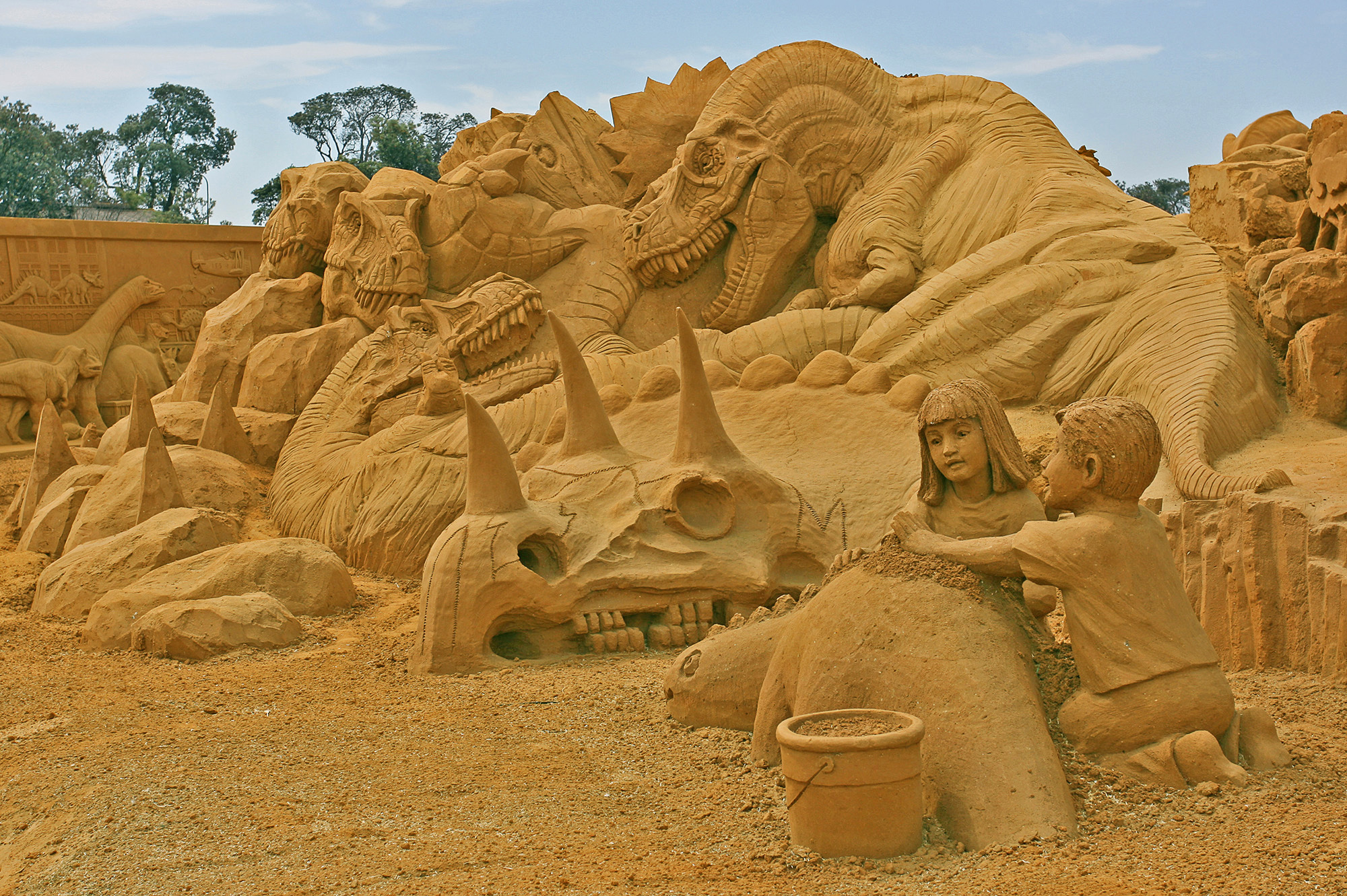
Sandsculpted dinosaurs in Australia, 2009

=== Depictions of dinosaurs ===
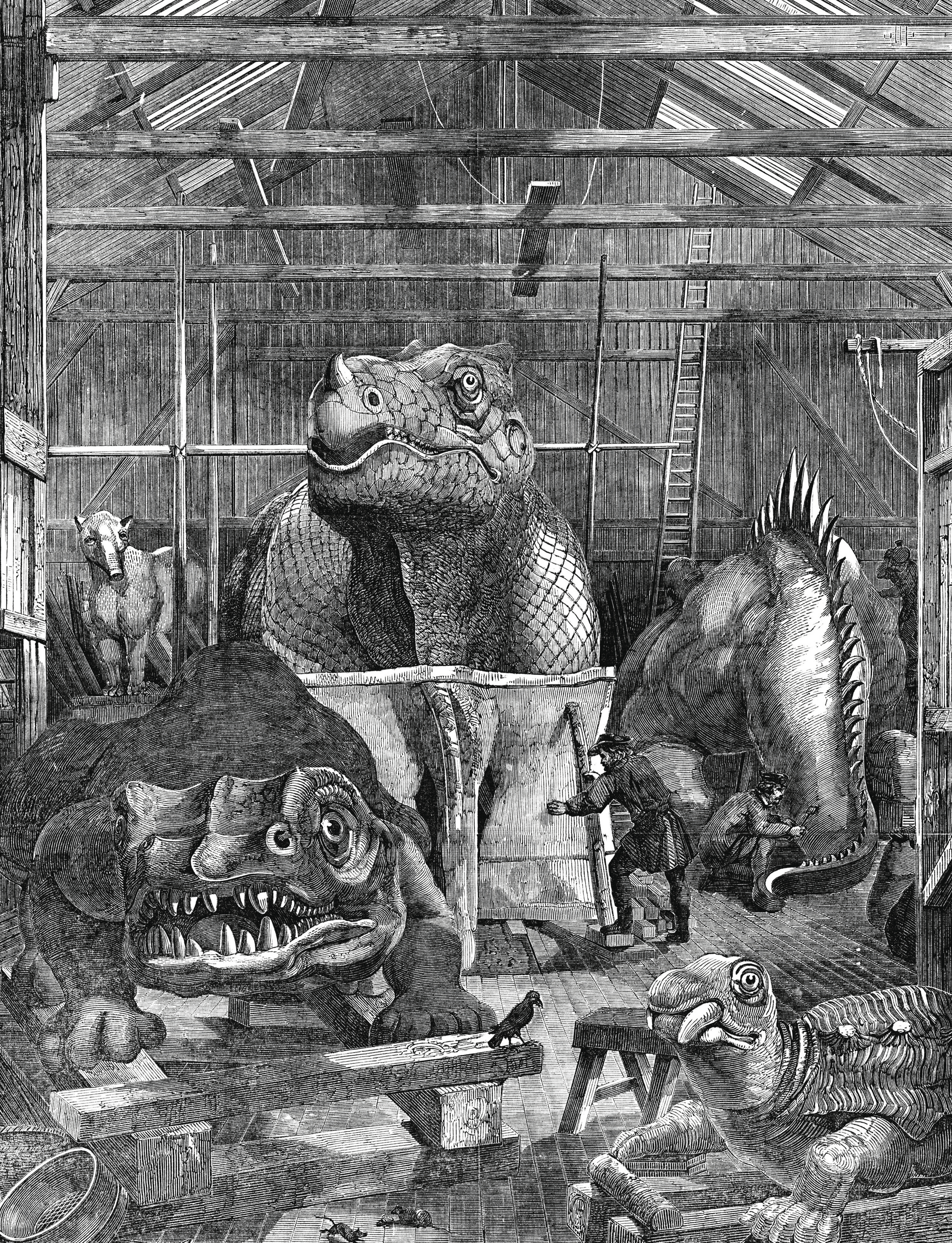
The Crystal Palace Dinosaurs under construction at Benjamin Waterhouse Hawkins' studio in Sydenham, c. 1853

Dinosaurs have been widely depicted in culture since the English palaeontologist Richard Owen coined the name dinosaur in 1842. As soon as 1854, a group of life-sized models, the Crystal Palace Dinosaurs, were on display to the public in south London. One dinosaur appeared in literature even earlier, as Charles Dickens placed a Megalosaurus in the first chapter of his novel Bleak House in 1852.

The dinosaurs featured in books, films, television programs, artwork, and other media have been used for both education and entertainment. The depictions range from the realistic, as in the television documentaries of the 1990s and first decade of the 21st century, or the fantastic, as in the monster movies of the 1950s and 1960s such as Q – The Winged Serpent. These were followed by Steven Spielberg's highly successful 1993 Jurassic Park, a film adaptation of Michael Crichton's 1990 novel, and its sequels, based on the idea of bringing a terrifying beast back from extinction by cloning from fossil DNA. Critics have noticed that Jurassic Park echoes themes from Mary Shelley's Frankenstein, the aggressive Velociraptor taking the place of Frankenstein's monster.

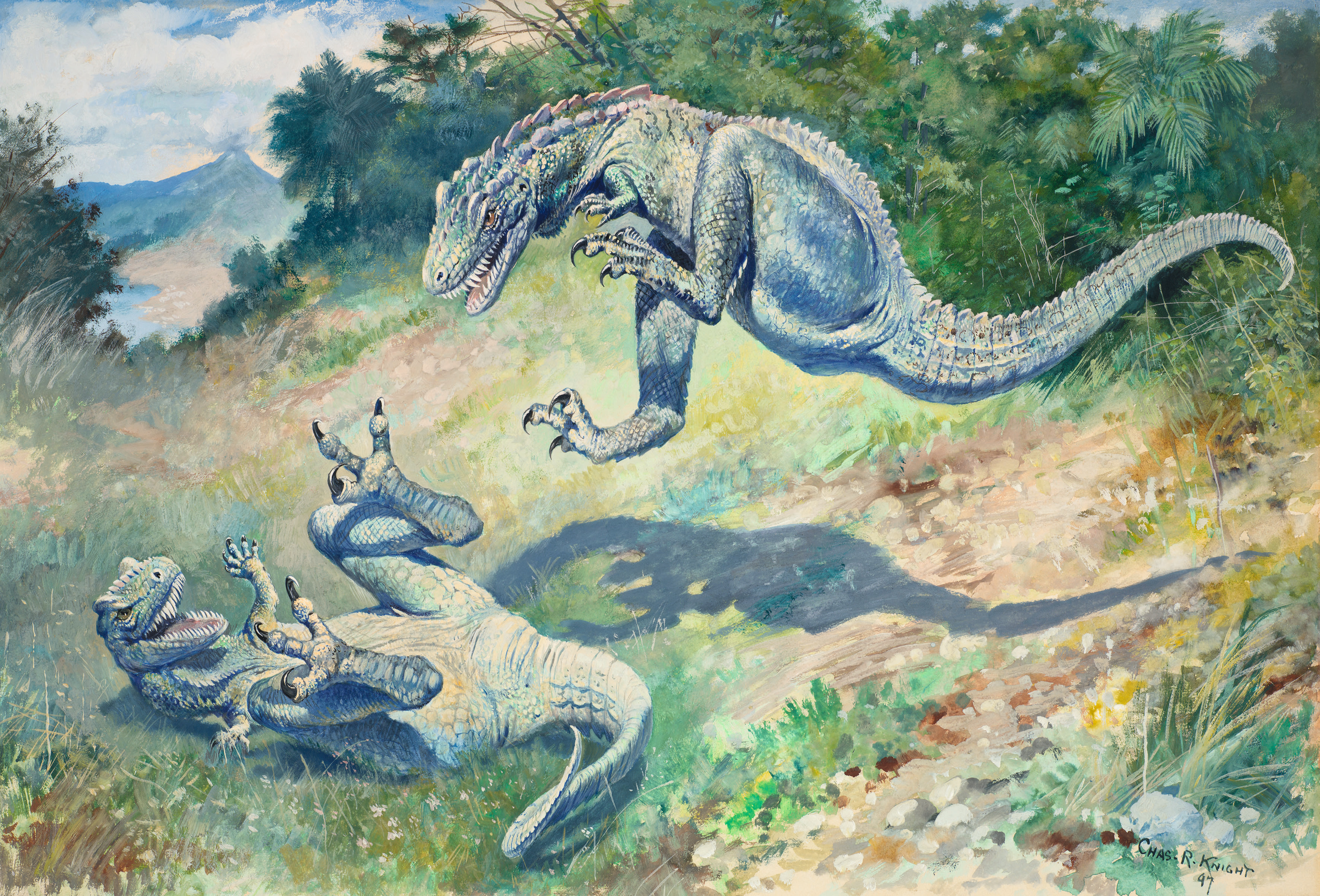
The 1897 painting of fighting "Laelaps" (now Dryptosaurus) by Charles R. Knight

The growth in interest in dinosaurs since the dinosaur renaissance has been accompanied by depictions made by artists working with ideas at the leading edge of dinosaur science, presenting lively dinosaurs and feathered dinosaurs as these concepts were first being considered. Cultural depictions of dinosaurs have been an important means of making scientific discoveries accessible to the public.

Cultural depictions have created or reinforced misconceptions about dinosaurs and other prehistoric animals, such as inaccurately and anachronistically portraying a sort of "prehistoric world" where many kinds of extinct animals (from the Permian animal Dimetrodon to mammoths and cavemen) lived together, with dinosaurs living lives of constant combat.

Other misconceptions reinforced by cultural depictions came from a scientific consensus that has now been overturned, such as the alternate usage of dinosaur to describe something that is maladapted or obsolete, or dinosaurs as slow and unintelligent.

== Practical interactions ==
=== Food and other products ===
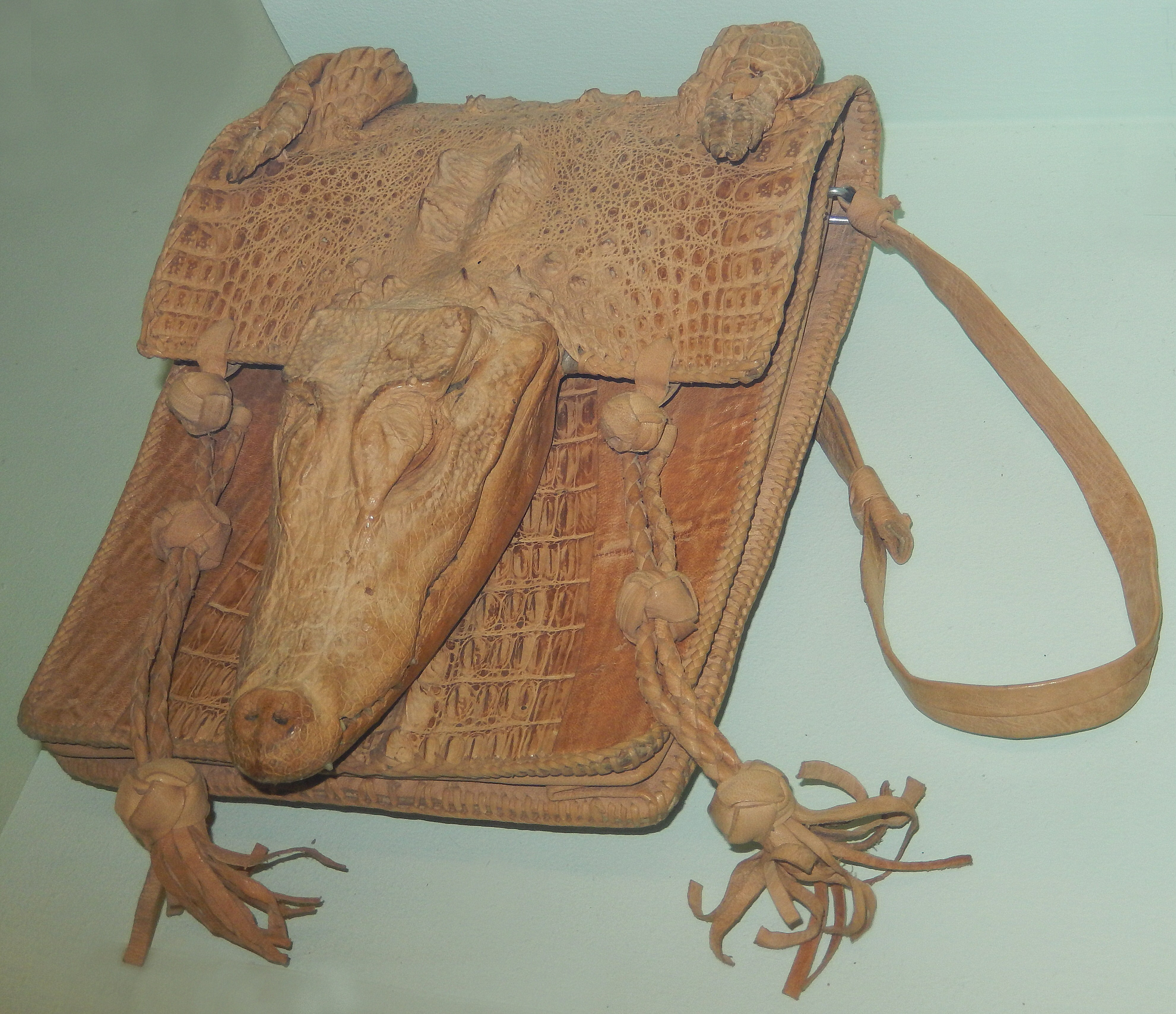
Handbag made from West African dwarf crocodile (Osteolaemus tetraspis) skin at the Natural History Museum, London

Crocodiles and alligators are farmed commercially. Their hides are tanned and used to make leather goods such as shoes and handbags; crocodile meat is considered a delicacy. The most commonly farmed species are the saltwater and Nile crocodiles. Farming has resulted in an increase in the saltwater crocodile population in Australia, as eggs are usually harvested from the wild, so landowners have an incentive to conserve their habitat. Crocodile leather is made into wallets, briefcases, purses, handbags, belts, hats, and shoes. Crocodile oil has been used for various purposes. Snakes are traded in the tens of thousands each year to meet the demand for exotic leather, for meat and for pets; some of this trade is legal and sustainable, but part of it is likely not.

Turtle meat is considered a delicacy in Asian cuisine, while turtle soup was once highly prized in English cuisine also. Turtle plastrons (shells) are widely used in traditional Chinese medicine; hundreds of tons of them are imported into Taiwan each year.

Crocodile meat is occasionally eaten as an "exotic" delicacy in the western world. Alligator meat is farmed for human consumption in the United States.

Snake soup is made in Cantonese cuisine. In Indonesia, drinking snake blood is believed to increase sexual virility. Snake wine (蛇酒) is an alcoholic beverage produced by infusing whole snakes in rice wine or grain alcohol. The drink was first recorded to have been consumed in China during the Western Zhou dynasty and considered an important curative and believed to reinvigorate a person according to Traditional Chinese medicine. Snake meat is rarely used in western cuisine, but rattlesnake meat is eaten in Texas.

=== In medicine ===
Lizards such as the Gila monster produce toxins with medical applications. Gila toxin reduces plasma glucose; the substance is now synthesised for use in the anti-diabetes drug exenatide (Byetta). A toxin from Gila monster saliva has been studied for use as an anti-Alzheimer's drug.

The cytotoxic effect of snake venom is being researched as a potential treatment for cancers.

Reptiles including crocodilians, snakes, turtles, and lizards are used in traditional medicine in Brazil for a wide range of conditions including asthma, headache, herpes zoster, impotence, infections, jaundice, respiratory diseases, snake bite, thrombosis, toothache, and wounds.

=== As threats ===
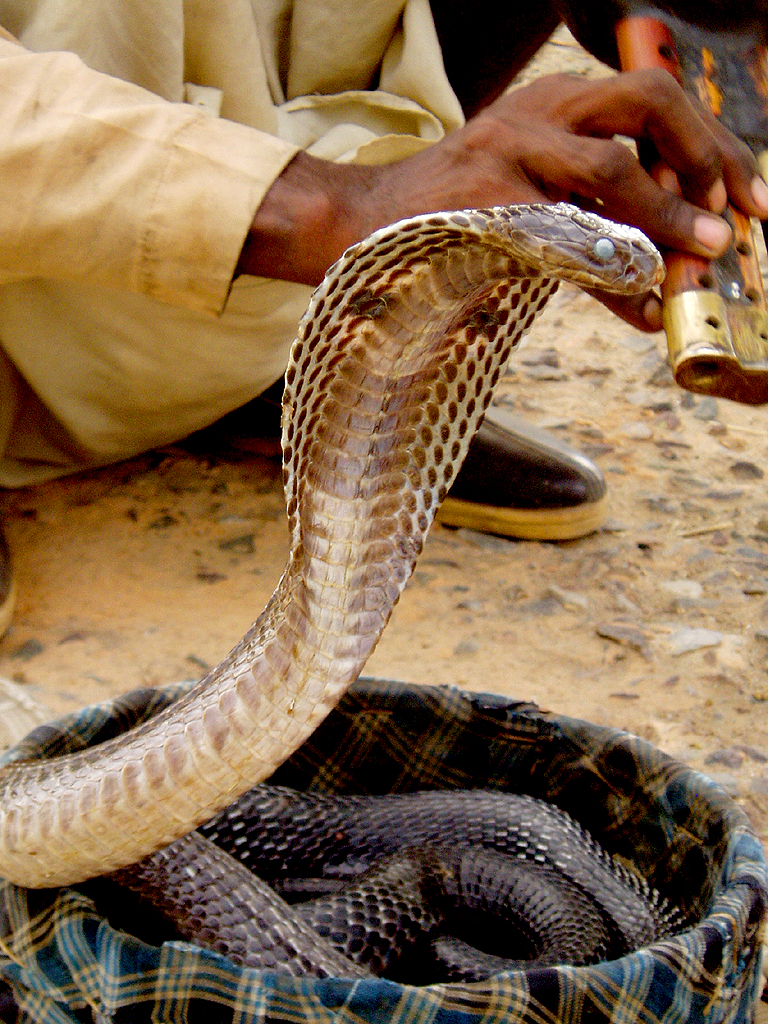
Traditional snake charming with Indian cobras

Deaths from snakebites are uncommon in many parts of the world, but are still counted in tens of thousands per year in India. Snakebite can be treated with antivenom made from the venom of the snake. To produce antivenom, a mixture of the venoms of different species of snake is injected into the body of a horse in ever-increasing dosages until the horse is immunized. Blood is then extracted; the serum is separated, purified and freeze-dried.

Large crocodiles, especially the saltwater crocodile and Nile crocodile, attack and kill hundreds of people each year in Southeast Asia and Africa.

=== For entertainment ===
In India, snake charming is a traditional roadside show. The snake charmer carries a basket that contains a snake to which he plays tunes from his flute, to which the snake appears to dance. Snakes respond to the movement of the flute, not the actual noise.

=== As pets ===
In the Western world, a variety of reptiles including iguanas, turtles, and some snakes (especially docile species such as the ball python and corn snake) are kept as pets; pond turtles were already used as pets in Roman times. Reptiles have a strong capacity for learning and can be playful. Some have specialised diets and require some skill to feed; many lizards and turtles are found on veterinary inspection to be suffering from metabolic bone disease, which can be caused by poor diet or lack of ultraviolet lighting. Poisoning by venomous reptile pets is rare, but bites from large lizards like green iguanas, which are widely kept as pets in the US, are more common, with some 800 cases per year.

=== Persecution and conservation ===
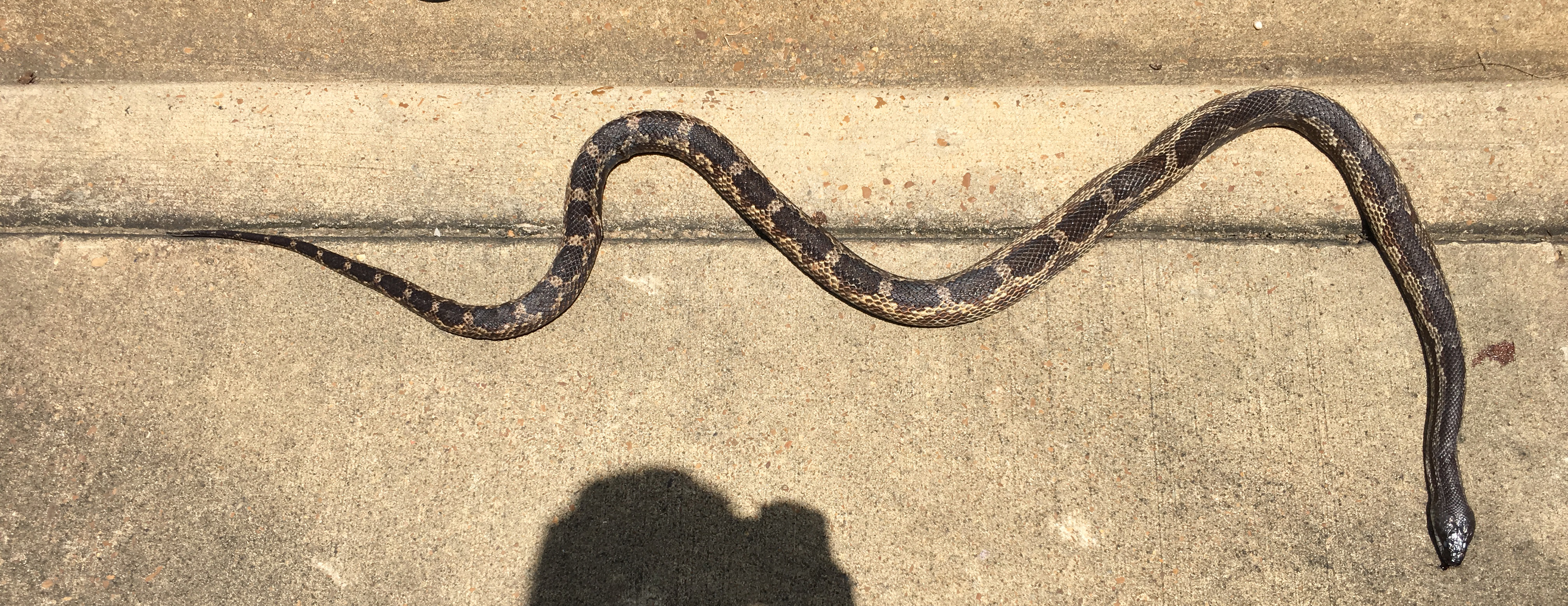
Snakes like this Western rat snake are often killed, accidentally or intentionally, on roads.

Cultural attitudes to reptiles include a widespread fear, sometimes extending to phobia, especially of snakes; Carl Sagan suggested that the fear may be ancestral, and it is indeed shared by other primates. In the US, 12% of men and 38% of women feared snakes; along with spiders, this is the most common phobia in Western societies. Negative attitudes extend in some countries to other reptiles; for example, the harmless gecko is considered to be evil and poisonous in Portugal. Such attitudes have contributed to persecution. Comic book characters themed around reptiles are often villains. Folklore about reptiles, too, is correlated with negative attitudes to them. Persecution resulting from folklore and people's attitudes can thus be added to the challenge of conserving reptiles, already threatened by human activities including destruction of their habitats, pollution, climate change, competition with introduced alien species, and excessive exploitation, such as for bushmeat. Persecution includes the deliberate killing of snakes across Europe, and the "rounding up" of rattlesnakes in America. An experiment using fake snakes and turtles in Canada showed that snakes were run over more often than turtles, often when drivers apparently intentionally swerved to strike the snakes. In Australia, 38% of people surveyed stated that they attacked large elapid snakes to protect children and pets, and because they feared and hated these snakes.

Several non-profit organizations around the world focus on reptile conservation, including the International Reptile Conservation Foundation, and the Amphibian and Reptile Conservation Trust. A peer-reviewed journal, Amphibian and Reptile Conservation, publishes research on the topic.
