= Ethnoherpetology =

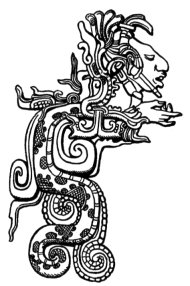
Vision Serpent from Yaxchilan

Ethnoherpetology is the study of the past and present interrelationships between human cultures and reptiles and amphibians. It is a sub-field of ethnozoology, which in turn is a sub-field of ethnobiology.

Snakes and amphibians have been considered chthonic creatures in many cultures. Richly represented in mythology, culture, art, and literature, they often evoke revulsion, fear, suspicion and awe, sometimes even hysteria. Frogs and toads were believed to announce the rains with their choruses.

== See also ==
- Colorado River toad
- Frogs in culture
- Herpetology
- Legendary salamander in popular culture
- Nāga
- Serpent (symbolism)

== Bibliography ==
- Bulmer, Ralph N.H. and Michael Tyler. 1968. Karam classification of frogs. Journal of the Polynesian Society 77(4): 621–639.
- Indraneil Das – The Serpent's Tongue: A contribution to the ethnoherpetology of India and adjacent countries (Frankfurt am Main: Edition Chimaira, 1998)
- Walsh, M.T. – Snakes and Other Reptiles in Mtanga: preliminary notes on ethnoherpetology in a village bordering Gombe Stream National Park, western Tanzania. (1997)
- Bertrand, H. – Contribution à l'étude de l'herpétologie et de l'ethnoherpétologie en Anjou (A study on the herpetology and ethnoherpetology of Anjou province)
- Lee, J. C. – Ethnoherpetology in the Yucatán Peninsula. In Amphibians and Reptiles of the Yucatán Peninsula, by J. C. Lee. Ithaca, NY: Cornell University Press, 1996.

An example of indigenous ethnoherpetological knowledge – notes written by a Bukusu-speaking research assistant from western Kenya:

- Wepukhulu, D. M. 1992. Bukusu Ethnozoology (Reptiles and Amphibians). Unpublished manuscript notes on Bukusu ethnozoology.
