= Crocodile fat =

Crocodile fat or crocodile/alligator oil is a lipid substance deriving from the bodies of the crocodilian family of reptiles. Since the beginning of commercial alligator farming in the United States, Australia, South Africa and South East Asia, crocodile fat became a commercial product that can be used in a number of ways, including medicine and as a feedstock for biodiesel.

== Energy use ==
Alligator fat was recently identified as a source to produce biodiesel. Every year, about 15 million pounds of alligator fat are disposed of in landfills as a waste byproduct of the alligator meat and skin industry. Studies have shown that biodiesel produced from alligator fat is similar in composition to biodiesel created from soybeans, and is cheaper to refine since it is primarily a waste product. Biodiesel made of crocodile fat can be utilized by cars.

A research work was published in Industrial Engineering Chemistry Research Journal. The authors show that recovery of lipids from the alligator fat tissue was studied by solvent extraction as well as by microwave rendering. Microwave rendering resulted in oil recovery of 61% by weight of the frozen fat tissue obtained from producers. The fatty acid profile of the lipid showed that palmitic acid (C16:0), palmitoleic acid (C16:1), and oleic acid (C18:1) were the dominant fatty acids accounting for 89–92% of all lipids by mass; 30% of the fatty acids were saturated and 70% were unsaturated. The biodiesel produced from alligator oil was found to meet the ASTM specifications of biodiesel concerning kinematic viscosity, sulfur, free and total glycerin, flash point, cloud point, and acid number.

The head of the research team Brahal Bajpai and his crew assessed that a large crocodile farm would produce biodiesel made out of crocodile fat at $2.51 a gallon, excluding the cost of the fat and transportation. The latter cost would presumably be $0, since it is a waste product anyway. Such a price would make it competitive with petroleum-derived diesel.

== Commercial products ==
Crocodile fat has been used in many traditional cultures as a medicine. Lotions and other products derived from alligator fat are now sold online.
