= Crocodile oil =

Extract of fatty tissue of crocodiles

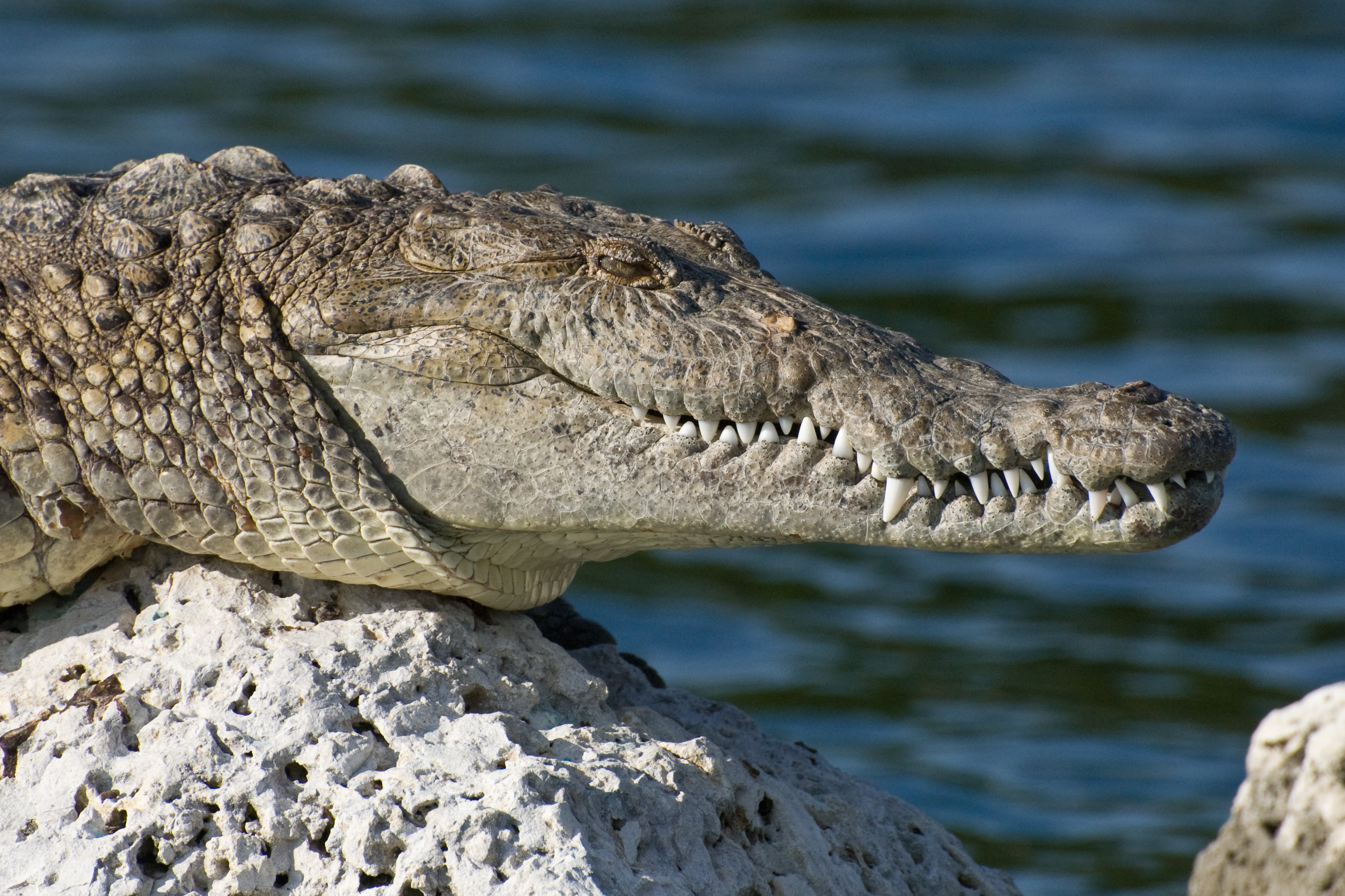
Biscayne American crocodile

Crocodile oil is extracted from the fatty tissues of crocodiles. Crocodile fat is a product of commercial farming, evident in Thailand. Historically, for centuries crocodile oil has been used by traditional practitioners across the globe, including Chinese traditional medicine, Southeast Asia, Ancient Egypt. Crocodile oil has been used since the nineteenth century for different purposes in different cultures. Due to the oil's components, its richness in monounsaturated and polyunsaturated fats, it is sold as ointment for treatment of skin conditions, skin structure enhancement, collagen deposition, and medicine for illnesses. In recent times, the use of crocodile oil has invited criticism from the use of crocodile oil as there is an increased demand for cruelty-free and vegan-friendly beauty products in consumers of today's society.

== History ==
Crocodile oil was used by traditional practitioners for centuries in treatment of ailments, skin conditions, and illnesses such as cancer. In Ancient Egyptian medicine, crocodile oil was used in a liniment to stimulate the growth of hair, to treat bald patches also called alopecia as well as prevent grey hair growth. Crocodile oil was recognised by the Ancient Egyptians to treat burns when combined with other components such as Egyptian goat fat and lion fat. Crocodile oil was also used by the Egyptians to help with trembling in limbs when smeared with other components including honey and olive oil. The Papyrus Ebers mentions Egyptians medicine recommends the creation of a vaginal contraceptive solution composed of crocodile oil, gum acacia or honey, and natron. The Historical Table of the Materia Media reports crocodile oil use in Egyptian Medicine in creating the ointment with combination of "slime of the nile", frictions of crocodile fat in rheumatism, salt, alum, platters. In Africa, crocodile oil is used for ailments such as skin rashes and to promote wound healing. There is also evidence of crocodile oil being used traditionally in South Africa. South Africans consult traditional healers, who still play a role in healthcare in rural areas. Crocodile fat is mixed with the ground bark of Cryptocarya latifolia and used by the Zulu people to treat chest ailments.

Crocodile oil was also used by Indian Ayurveda medicine in the nineteenth century for treatment of burns. Crocodile oil use in India is recorded in other journals, specifically, the oil is prepared by the Sanif tribe of the Punjab, who eat crocodile fat. They state crocodile oil contains larger amounts of "solidifiable fat" than any fish oil. The journal also mentions the oil to be procurable in abundance in Agra. Similarly, a journal published by Royal Society of Arts in 1879 discussed the commercial value of crocodile oil as well as how the oil was used in the nineteenth century specifically in Agra, India. A Western researcher determined that crocodile oil contained a larger proportion of solid fat either cod liver or fish oils. They softened the quality of various animal oils on leather and found leather treated with crocodile oil remained stiffer compared to other natural oils. Melted fat of crocodile or crocodile oil was also recorded to be used for "gastric obstructions". Nature, in 1886, refers to the use of crocodile oil in Germany for leather dressing, prepared in Punjab and solidified at 33 degrees.

Chinese traditional medicine as well as Southeast Asian traditional medicine uses crocodile oil and products as ointments for burns and scalds. A study tested burn wound-healing efficacy of crocodile oil through a Chinese herbal medicine called crocodile oil burn ointment, consisting of crocodile oil, natural mineral and extraction of other herbal medicines by employing second-degree burns in rats and found crocodile oil enhances burn wound healing capabilities. Chinese traditional medicine uses the oil of crocodiles for other conditions such as bronchitis, allergy, skin problems, high blood pressure, and cancer. Crocodile oil is also prescribed to treat burns, skin ulcers and cancer, coughs, and asthma in Madagascar. There is also evidence of crocodile oil being used traditionally in South Africa for skin condition treatments for eczema and rashes and for promoting wound healing. Crocodile oil is used in Mexico for treatment of illnesses such as asthma, emphysema, and influenza.

== Composition ==
The following tables provides information about the composition of the fatty acids in crocodile oil, a more recent and detailed table can be found in Ngernjan et al.:

Fatty acid contents in crocodile oil
Fatty acid	% Methylated content
Undedecanoate	0.139 ± 0.092
Tridecanoate	0.017 ± 0.006
Myristate	1.156 ± 0.167
Pentadecanoate	0.250 ± 0.000
Palmitoleate	3.138 ± 0.231
Palmitate	15.436 ± 1.038
Heptadecanoate	0.476 ± 0.054
Linoleate	4.031 ± 0.776
Linolelaidic	0.161 ± 0.093
Oleate	19.593 ± 1.764
Elaidate	0.205 ± 0.086
Stearate	1.359 ± 0.738
Eicosenoate	0.051 ± 0.024
Arachidate	0.002 ± 0.002
Erucate	< 0.001
Lignoceric acid	1.339 ± 0.675

The table below compares acid in crocodile oil and human skin oil:

Crocodile oil compared to human skin oil
	Crocodile oil %	Human skin oil %
Palmitoleic acid (omega-7)	6.00	3.80
Palmitic acid	23.00	20.20
Myristic acid	0.94	2.10
Stearic acid	6.00	11.20
Oleic acid (omega-9)	39.00	30.80
Linoleic acid (omega-6)	20.00	15.10
α-Linolenic acid (omega-3)	1.37	0.30

According to Venter, the composition of fatty acids in crocodile oil compared those found in human skin oil indicated that the palmitoleic acid (6%), oleic acid (39%), and linoleic acid (20%) in crocodile oil showed higher percentage than in human skin oil.

== Evaluation of use ==
=== Skin condition ===
Crocodile oil was also used by traditional practitioners to treat skin conditions including microbial infections and inflammatory conditions. A research by the State Key Laboratory of Marine Environmental Science in China describes the burn wound healing capabilities in crocodile oil indicated by decrease in wound closure time and scar formation in rats. The fatty acid profile of crocodile oil indicates that the oil consists mainly of fatty acids that possess antimicrobial and anti-inflammatory properties. A research provides scientific evidence of the antimicrobial and anti-inflammatory properties of crocodile oil, compared the use of crocodile oil by traditional healers. Their research focused on the study of burn ointment (COBO), topical Chinese herbal medicine (CHM) a compound made from natural mineral, crocodile oil, and extraction of five herbal medicines.

The fatty acid profile of crocodile oil indicates that the oil consists mainly of fatty acids that possess antimicrobial and anti-inflammatory properties (Kabara et al., 1972, Maroon and Bost, 2006). This study provides novel scientific evidence of antimicrobial and anti-inflammatory properties of crocodile oil, justifying its use by traditional healers. It highlighted the effects these properties may have when applied as oil or ointment on human skin. A clinical study tested the positive claims of crocodile oil in treatment of ageing skin in comparison to placebo lotion. They found crocodile oil had "good stability over 6 months period", both lotions showed an increase in skin hydration. Venter's research showed no improvement in skin scaliness and elasticity. Treatment of ageing skin has become very popular over the last decade. Ageing skin is characterised by wrinkles, sagging skin and decreased laxity. As a result, crocodile oil is used for skin repair to assist in skin quality and appearance as well as skin conditions. According to Croc City, crocodile oil and crocodile oil containing products currently on the market, are used for treatment of dermatitis, scrapes, acne, razor bumps, bed sores, haemorrhoids, inflammation of arthritic conditions, treatment of discolouration, pigmentation of skin-like brown spots, freckles, menopausal darkening, treatment of dry, flaky, itchy and ageing skin, nappy rash, athlete's foot, jock-itch and irritation of head skin. Crocodile oil lotion is proven to be a safe product to use on skin.

=== Commercial production ===
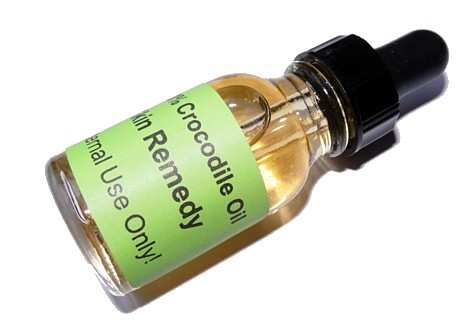
Crocodile oil colour

With the increase in commercial alligator farming in countries including Thailand, the United States, Australia, South Africa, and South East Asia, crocodile fat and oil became a commercial product that can be used in a number of ways such as medicine, skin care products, and as a feedstock for biodiesel. Natural oils are extensively used in cosmetics and as treatment for a growing number of conditions. According to Vermaak, the natural products industry is a multibillion-dollar industry and has grew enormously in the years up to 2011. Crocodile oil as an oil mainly containing fatty acids contribute to beneficial properties in cosmetics and personal care products. More specifically, crocodile oil is also used in the tanning industry. The oil can range from about $US4 for a tube of crocodile lip balm to about $US104 for a large jar of pure crocodile oil balm. Businesses consider the capability to convert crocodile fat to a marketable oil. They can capitalise on "first-mover advantage" due to crocodile oil benefits. Golden 8 Skincare is an Australian company, using crocodile oil as the main ingredient of its product. The company's description of the product include "Packed full of Omegas 3,6 7 and 9 to help in the healing of skin conditions due to its Natural Moisturising Factor (NMF) Crocodile Oil helps prevents dermal irritation and regenerates the skin whilst providing the skin its daily dose of Omegas to produce clear, glowing, healthy skin." Crocodile oil lotions and other products derived from crocodile fat can be seen sold online for personal use.

== Criticism ==
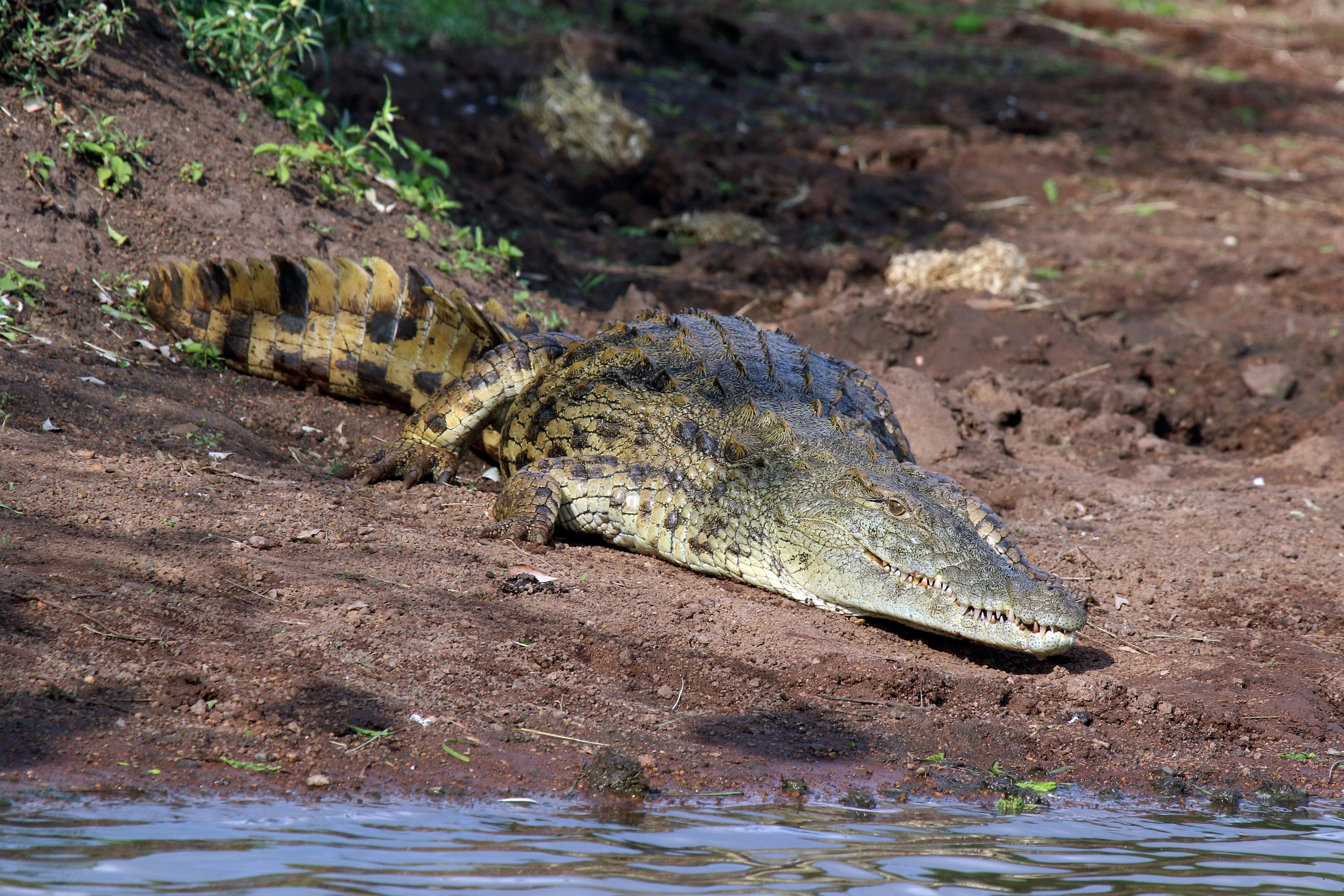
Nile Crocodile, also known as Crocodylus niloticus

Critics of Crocodile farming mentions the use of crocodile oil as a contribution to the diminishing numbers of various crocodile species. Many species of crocodile are endangered such as the Siamese crocodile, which is farmed in Thailand.

=== CITES and species risk ===
According to the Convention on International Trade in Endangered Species of Wild Fauna and Flora (CITES), products made from endangered species can be legally traded after certification. CITES lists the Nile crocodile under Appendix II which means a species that is not necessarily currently endangered, but which is in danger of becoming extinct unless trade in specimens is strictly regulated to prevent uses that threaten its survival. The collection, processing, domestic trading, and exporting of all crocodile products must be controlled. Over catching of this animal has led to the decline of this species in wild populations. Efforts are made to preserve the existing habitat of this species. Crocodiles have been bred in farms since the early twentieth century, where Thai crocodile farming industry is currently the largest in the world. Breeding this animal under captivity is a developing industry in some parts of the world.

== See also ==
- Emu oil
- Snake oil
- Coconut oil
- Argan oil
- Tea tree oil
